= List of stars in Antlia =

This is the list of notable stars in the constellation Antlia, sorted by decreasing brightness.

Name	B	Var	HD	HIP	RA	Dec	vis. mag.	abs. mag.	Dist. (ly)	Sp. class	Notes
α Ant	α		90610	51172	10^{h} 27^{m} 09.16^{s}	−31° 04′ 04.1″	4.28	−0.97	366	K4III	suspected variable, V_{max} = 4.22^{m}, V_{min} = 4.29^{m}
ε Ant	ε		82150	46515	09^{h} 29^{m} 14.74^{s}	−35° 57′ 04.9″	4.51	−2.15	700	K3III	variable star, ΔV = 0.003^{m}, P = 0.09026 d
ι Ant	ι (Note: Also labelled Upsilon Antliae (υ Ant/υ Antliae) by Bode in his Uranographia)		94890	53502	10^{h} 56^{m} 43.00^{s}	−37° 08′ 14.9″	4.60	0.67	199	K0III	has two planets (b and c)
θ Ant	θ		84367	47758	09^{h} 44^{m} 12.13^{s}	−27° 46′ 10.4″	4.78	−0.58	384	A7V+...	binary star
η Ant	η		86629	48926	09^{h} 58^{m} 52.34^{s}	−35° 53′ 27.4″	5.23	2.66	106	A8IV	double star
HD 90132	μ (Note: Labelled Mu Antliae (μ Ant/μ Antliae) by Bode in his Uranographia)		90132	50888	10^{h} 23^{m} 29.41^{s}	−38° 00′ 35.0″	5.34	2.30	132	A8V	
HD 96146	χ (Note: Labelled Chi Antliae (χ Ant/χ Antliae) by Bode in his Uranographia)		96146	54173	11^{h} 04^{m} 54.21^{s}	−35° 48′ 16.9″	5.43	−0.63	530	A0V	binary star
HD 82205	(υ) (Note: Labelled Upsilon Pyxidis (υ Pyx/υ Pyxidis) by Bode in his Uranographia)		82205	46578	09^{h} 29^{m} 54.52^{s}	−26° 35′ 22.6″	5.49	−1.36	763	K2IIICNII	double star
U Ant		U	91793	51821	10^{h} 35^{m} 12.88^{s}	−39° 33′ 45.3″	5.50	−1.54	836	C6,3(N0)	slow irregular variable, V_{max} = 5.27^{m}, V_{min} = 6.04^{m}
HR 4049	φ (Note: Labelled Phi Antliae (φ Ant/φ Antliae) by Bode in his Uranographia)	AG	89353	50456	10^{h} 18^{m} 07.60^{s}	−28° 59′ 31.3″	5.52	−3.60	2173	B9.5Ib/II	protoplanetary nebula, V_{max} = 5.29^{m}, V_{min} = 5.83^{m}, P = 429 d
δ Ant A	δ		90972	51376	10^{h} 29^{m} 35.40^{s}	−30° 36′ 25.5″	5.56	−0.27	481	B9/B9.5V	component of the δ Ant system; suspected variable, V_{max} = 5.55^{m}, V_{min} = 5.60^{m}
HD 93905	τ (Note: Labelled Tau Antliae (τ Ant/τ Antliae) by Bode in his Uranographia)		93905	52965	10^{h} 49^{m} 57.05^{s}	−34° 03′ 29.5″	5.61	0.48	346	A1V	
HD 83380			83380	47199	09^{h} 37^{m} 09.87^{s}	−32° 10′ 43.0″	5.62	1.05	267	K1III	
HD 92845	ρ (Note: Labelled Rho Antliae (ρ Ant/ρ Antliae) by Bode in his Uranographia)		92845	52407	10^{h} 42^{m} 43.21^{s}	−32° 42′ 56.4″	5.63	−0.71	605	A0V	double star
HD 83332			83332	47187	09^{h} 37^{m} 00.25^{s}	−25° 17′ 48.7″	5.68	0.91	293	K0III	
ζ^{1} Ant B	ζ^{1}		82383	46657	09^{h} 30^{m} 46.08^{s}	−31° 53′ 21.0″	5.75	0.46	372	A0	binary star
HD 86267			86267	48748	09^{h} 56^{m} 35.47^{s}	−33° 25′ 06.8″	5.83	−0.01	479	K1III	
HD 82514			82514	46736	09^{h} 31^{m} 32.93^{s}	−35° 42′ 51.6″	5.86	1.15	285	K3III	triple star
ζ^{2} Ant	ζ^{2}		82513	46734	09^{h} 31^{m} 32.19^{s}	−31° 52′ 18.6″	5.91	0.61	374	A9IV	
HD 88809			88809	50103	10^{h} 13^{m} 45.98^{s}	−40° 20′ 45.9″	5.91	0.21	450	K1III	double star
HD 85206			85206	48191	09^{h} 49^{m} 28.15^{s}	−37° 11′ 12.4″	5.95	0.47	407	K2III	
HD 83441			83441	47224	09^{h} 37^{m} 28.42^{s}	−36° 05′ 45.6″	5.96	0.89	337	K2III	
HD 88218			88218	49769	10^{h} 09^{m} 32.09^{s}	−35° 51′ 24.5″	6.14	3.70	100	G1V	binary star
HD 82165			82165	46517	09^{h} 29^{m} 16.25^{s}	−38° 24′ 12.8″	6.15	2.18	203	A6V	
HD 89015			89015	50234	10^{h} 15^{m} 20.89^{s}	−36° 31′ 03.8″	6.17	0.91	367	K0III	
ζ^{1} Ant A	ζ^{1}		82384		09^{h} 30^{m} 46.10^{s}	−31° 53′ 22.0″	6.18				component of the ζ^{1} Ant system
HD 90071			90071	50868	10^{h} 23^{m} 13.14^{s}	−30° 09′ 44.0″	6.25	2.60	175	A9IV	
HD 87606			87606	49418	10^{h} 05^{m} 15.28^{s}	−36° 23′ 03.7″	6.27	0.71	422	K1III	
HD 85725			85725	48468	09^{h} 52^{m} 58.21^{s}	−27° 19′ 56.7″	6.28	2.50	186	G1V	double star
HD 88522			88522	49967	10^{h} 12^{m} 02.88^{s}	−28° 36′ 21.4″	6.28	0.31	509	A0V	double star
HD 89442			89442	50492	10^{h} 18^{m} 37.88^{s}	−36° 48′ 16.5″	6.31	−0.04	608	K2/K3III	
BF Ant		BF	86301	48776	09^{h} 56^{m} 54.14^{s}	−27° 28′ 30.8″	6.32	0.38	502	A4V	δ Scuti variable, ΔV = 0.01^{m}
HD 88836			88836	50122	10^{h} 13^{m} 56.58^{s}	−40° 18′ 38.7″	6.33	0.64	448	G8III	double star
HD 88013			88013	49645	10^{h} 08^{m} 01.67^{s}	−37° 20′ 00.5″	6.34	0.05	590	K0III	
HD 85296			85296	48219	09^{h} 49^{m} 51.36^{s}	−36° 16′ 06.5″	6.36	0.20	555	K0III	
HD 92589			92589	52273	10^{h} 40^{m} 51.56^{s}	−35° 44′ 30.2″	6.36	−0.28	695	G8/K0III+..	double star
HD 88742			88742	50075	10^{h} 13^{m} 24.99^{s}	−33° 01′ 54.8″	6.38	4.60	74	G0V	
HD 84224			84224	47627	09^{h} 42^{m} 41.37^{s}	−35° 30′ 06.2″	6.39	−1.80	1417	Asp...	
HD 87477			87477	49343	10^{h} 04^{m} 23.39^{s}	−39° 58′ 33.1″	6.42	−0.03	637	K1III	
S Ant		S	82610	46810	09^{h} 32^{m} 18.45^{s}	−28° 37′ 40.4″	6.43	2.05	245	A9V	W Uma variable, V_{max} = 6.27^{m}, V_{min} = 6.83^{m}, P = 0.6483489 d
HD 82785			82785	46874	09^{h} 33^{m} 07.71^{s}	−39° 07′ 45.0″	6.43	2.12	237	F2IV/V	binary star
HD 84567	κ (Note: Labelled Kappa Antliae (κ Ant/κ Antliae) by Bode in his Uranographia)		84567	47868	09^{h} 45^{m} 22.01^{s}	−30° 12′ 09.9″	6.45	-3.7	3500	B0.5IIIn	suspected variable
HD 83108			83108	47039	09^{h} 35^{m} 11.88^{s}	−35° 49′ 25.5″	6.48	2.47	207	F5V	
HD 87660	ο (Note: Labelled Omicron Antliae (ο Ant/ο Antliae) by Bode in his Uranographia)		87660	49450	10^{h} 05^{m} 45.30^{s}	–30° 53′ 29.9″	6.62		517	G8III	
HD 89528	ν (Note: Labelled Nu Antliae (ν Ant/ν Antliae) by Bode in his Uranographia)		89528	50525	10^{h} 19^{m} 10.81^{s}	–34° 36′ 59.6″	6.73		575	A1V	
HD 86193	λ (Note: Labelled Lambda Antliae (λ Ant/λ Antliae) by Bode in his Uranographia)		86193	48723	09^{h} 56^{m} 15.59^{s}	–31° 05′ 29.3″	6.93		706	A1III/IV	
HD 92987			92987	52472	10^{h} 43^{m} 36.0^{s}	−39° 03′ 31″	7.0		142	G2/3V	has a planet (b)
HD 86376	π (Note: Labelled Pi Antliae (π Ant/π Antliae) by Bode in his Uranographia)		86376	48807	09^{h} 57^{m} 16.58^{s}	–32° 51′ 28.1″	7.18		977	A2V	
HD 93083			93083	52521	10^{h} 44^{m} 20.91^{s}	−33° 34′ 37.2″	8.33	6.03	94	K2V	Macondo; has a planet (b)
T Ant		T		46924	09^{h} 33^{m} 50.86^{s}	−36° 36′ 56.7″	9.26	-0.7	3200	G5	Classical Cepheid, V_{max} = 8.88^{m}, V_{min} = 9.82^{m}, P = 5.898053 d
AR Ant		AR	88888	50160	10^{h} 14^{m} 21.01^{s}	−38° 09′ 13.7″	9.36		4,150	M2/3	Long period variable
δ Ant B	δ	BZ	90972B		10^{h} 29^{m} 34.77^{s}	−30° 36′ 33.1″	9.65	3.81	481	F9Ve	component of the δ Ant system; T Tauri star, ΔV = 0.04^{m}, P = 3.3 d
TWA 6		BX			10^{h} 18^{m} 28.70^{s}	−31° 50′ 02.9″	10.65			M0Ve	T Tauri star, ΔV = 0.149^{m}, P = 0.5409 d
WASP-66					10^{h} 32^{m} 54.0^{s}	−34° 59′ 23″	11.6	3.7	1239	F4	has a transiting planet (b)
TWA 7		CE			10^{h} 42^{m} 30.06^{s}	−33° 40′ 16.6″	11.73			M2Ve	T Tauri star, ΔV = 0.11^{m}, P = 5.00 d
UX Ant		UX			10^{h} 57^{m} 09.0^{s}	−37° 23′ 56″	12.37				R CrB variable, V_{max} = 11.5^{m}, V_{min} = <18.0^{m}
DEN 1048-3956					10^{h} 48^{m} 15^{s}	−39° 56′ 06″	17.53	4.52	13.051	M9V	brown dwarf
XTE J0929-314		BW			09^{h} 29^{m} 20.19^{s}	−31° 29′ 03.2″	18.63				X-ray pulsar, V_{max} = 18.63^{m}, V_{min} = 22.89^{m}, P = 0.030263 d
2MASS 0939-2448					09^{h} 39^{m} 39.49^{s}	−24° 48′ 27.9″			17	T8	binary brown dwarf
Table legend: • Name = Proper name • B = Bayer designation • F or/and G. = Flamsteed designation or Gould designation • Var = Variable star designation • HD = Henry Draper Catalogue designation number • HIP = Hipparcos Catalogue designation number • RA = Right ascension for the Epoch/Equinox J2000.0 • Dec = Declination for the Epoch/Equinox J2000.0 • vis. mag. = visual magnitude (m or m_{v}), also known as apparent magnitude • abs. mag. = absolute magnitude (M_{v}) • Dist. (ly) = Distance in light-years from Earth • Sp. class = Spectral class of the star in the stellar classification system • Notes = Common name(s) or alternate name(s); comments; notable properties [for example: multiple star status, range of variability if it is a variable star, exoplanets, etc.]

== See also ==
- List of stars by constellation
