= List of red dwarfs =

This is a list of exceptional red dwarfs.

== List of titleholding red dwarf stars ==
=== List of red dwarf firsts ===
Record Title	Star	Date	Data	Notes
First discovered	Lacaille 8760	1753		Originally listed in a 1763 catalog that was published posthumously by Abbé Nicolas Louis de Lacaille. Further information: § List of the earliest red dwarfs discovered
First discovered with planet(s)	Gliese 876	1998	Gliese 876 b	See also: List of exoplanet firsts The Jovian planet was the first discovered around a red dwarf.
First discovered with giant planet(s)	Gliese 876	1998	Gliese 876 b	The giant planet was the first planet discovered around a red dwarf.
First discovered with terrestrial planet(s)	Kepler-42 (KOI-961)	2012	KOI-961 b KOI-961 c KOI-961 d	3 terrestrial planets were discovered around KOI-961 in 2012, the first terrestrial planets found to orbit a red dwarf.

=== List of red dwarf extremes ===
Record Title	Star	Date	Data	Notes	References
Least voluminous	EBLM J0555-57Ab	2017	r= 59,000 km (37,000 mi)	Further information: § List of least voluminous red dwarfs	
Most voluminous	V358 Boo	2020	3.73 R_{☉}	Further information: § List of most voluminous red dwarfs	
Least massive	2MASS J0523-1403	2015	67.54±12.79 M_{J}	Further information: § List of least massive red dwarfs	
Most massive	Kepler-80	2012	0.73 M_{☉}	Further information: § List of most massive red dwarfs	
Least distant	Proxima Centauri	1917	4.2 ly (1.3 pc)	Further information: § List of nearest red dwarfs This is also known as Alpha Centauri C and is a member of the α Cen trinary system. It is the nearest neighbouring star to the Sun.	
Most distant	UDF 3561	2010	202,000 ly (62,000 pc)	Further information: § List of furthest red dwarfs	
Least luminous	2MASS J0523-1403			Further information: § List of least luminous red dwarfs	
Most luminous				Further information: § List of most luminous red dwarfs	
Dimmest	UDF 2457		V= 25	Further information: § List of dimmest red dwarfs	
Brightest	Lacaille 8760		V= 6.69	Further information: § List of brightest red dwarfs Also called AX Microscopii. This is the 24th closest star to the Sun, and also intrinsically luminous for red dwarfs, having spectral class M0.	
Youngest	See T Tauri star			Further information: § List of youngest red dwarfs	
Oldest	See cool subdwarfs			Further information: § List of oldest red dwarfs	

== List of named red dwarfs ==
This is a list of red dwarfs with names that are not systematically designated.

Star	Naming	Notes
Proxima Centauri	Named for being the closest neighbouring star to Earth's Sun	Lies within the Alpha Centauri star system
Barnard's Star	Named after its discoverer, E. E. Barnard	Second closest neighbouring star system to Earth, after α Cen. Also the star with the highest proper motion.
van Biesbroeck's star	Named for its discoverer, George van Biesbroeck	Was once the least luminous, and, lowest mass, known star.
Kapteyn's star	Named for the astronomer who discovered it had gone missing, Jacobus Kapteyn	Was once the star with the highest proper motion, thus making it move away from its recorded position in the sky and go "missing".
Teegarden's Star	Named after the lead investigator astrophysicist who discovered it, Bonnard J. Teegarden, through a datacrunching search of archived data.	

== List of nearest red dwarfs ==
	Star	Distance ly (pc)	Notes
1	Proxima Centauri	4.2 ly (1.3 pc)	Part of the α Cen trinary system, the closest neighbouring star system. It is also the nearest neighbouring star.
2	Barnard's Star	5.95 ly (1.82 pc)	Second closest neighbouring star system
3	Wolf 359	7.86 ly (2.41 pc)	Also called CN Leonis
4	Lalande 21185	8.3 ly (2.5 pc)	
5	Luyten 726-8	8.7 ly (2.7 pc)	This is a binary star system with two red dwarfs
6	Ross 154	9.68 ly (2.97 pc)	

== List of least voluminous red dwarfs ==
	Star	Radius Solar radii (Sun = 1)	Radius Jupiter radii (Jupiter = 1)	Radius km (mi)	Notes
1	EBLM J0555-57Ab	0.084	0.84	59,000 km (37,000 mi)	This star is slightly larger than the planet Saturn.
2	2MASS J0523-1403	0.086	0.86	60,000 km (37,000 mi)	

=== Timeline of smallest red dwarf recordholders ===
This is a list of titleholders of being the red dwarf with the smallest volume, and its succession over time.

Star	Date	Radius Solar radii (Sun = 1)	Radius Jupiter radii (Jupiter = 1)	Radius km (mi)	Notes
EBLM J0555-57Ab	2017—	0.084	0.84	59,000 km (37,000 mi)	This star is slightly larger than the planet Saturn.
2MASS J0523-1403	2013-2017	0.086	0.86	60,000 km (37,000 mi)	
OGLE-TR-122B	2005-2013	0.120	1.16	81,100 km (50,400 mi)	

== See also ==
- List of least massive stars
- List of brown dwarfs
- Lists of stars
