= Lists of stars =

The following are lists of stars. Stars are astronomical objects that spend some portion of their existence generating energy through thermonuclear fusion.

== By constellation ==
- Andromeda
- Antlia
- Apus
- Aquarius
- Aquila
- Ara
- Aries
- Auriga
- Boötes
- Caelum
- Camelopardalis
- Cancer
- Canes Venatici
- Canis Major
- Canis Minor
- Capricornus
- Carina
- Cassiopeia
- Centaurus
- Cepheus
- Cetus
- Chamaeleon
- Circinus
- Columba
- Coma Berenices
- Corona Australis
- Corona Borealis
- Corvus
- Crater
- Crux
- Cygnus
- Delphinus
- Dorado
- Draco
- Equuleus
- Eridanus
- Fornax
- Gemini
- Grus
- Hercules
- Horologium
- Hydra
- Hydrus
- Indus
- Lacerta
- Leo
- Leo Minor
- Lepus
- Libra
- Lupus
- Lynx
- Lyra
- Mensa
- Microscopium
- Monoceros
- Musca
- Norma
- Octans
- Ophiuchus
- Orion
- Pavo
- Pegasus
- Perseus
- Phoenix
- Pictor
- Pisces
- Piscis Austrinus
- Puppis
- Pyxis
- Reticulum
- Sagitta
- Sagittarius
- Scorpius
- Sculptor
- Scutum
- Serpens
- Sextans
- Taurus
- Telescopium
- Triangulum
- Triangulum Australe
- Tucana
- Ursa Major
- Ursa Minor
- Vela
- Virgo
- Volans
- Vulpecula

== By name ==
- List of Arabic star names
- List of Chinese star names
- List of proper names of stars
- Nakshatra
- Stars named after people

== By distance ==
- List of most distant stars

=== Nearest stars ===
- List of nearest stars (up to 20 light-years)
- List of nearest stars by spectral type
- List of nearest bright stars

=== By luminosity ===
- List of nearest giant stars
- List of nearest supergiants
- List of nearest hypergiants

=== 20–100 light years away ===
- List of star systems within 20–25 light-years
- List of star systems within 25–30 light-years
- List of star systems within 30–35 light-years
- List of star systems within 35–40 light-years
- List of star systems within 40–45 light-years
- List of star systems within 45–50 light-years
- List of star systems within 50–55 light-years
- List of star systems within 55–60 light-years
- List of star systems within 60–65 light-years
- List of star systems within 65–70 light-years
- List of star systems within 70–75 light-years
- List of star systems within 75–80 light-years
- List of star systems within 80–85 light-years
- List of star systems within 85–90 light-years
- List of star systems within 90–95 light-years
- List of star systems within 95–100 light-years

=== 100–500 light-years away ===
- List of star systems within 100–150 light-years
- List of star systems within 150–200 light-years
- List of star systems within 200–250 light-years
- List of star systems within 250–300 light-years
- List of star systems within 300–350 light-years
- List of star systems within 350–400 light-years
- List of star systems within 400–450 light-years
- List of star systems within 450–500 light-years

== By physical characteristic ==
- List of brightest stars
- List of brightest stars by year
- List of most luminous stars
- List of most massive stars
- List of largest known stars
- List of smallest known stars
- List of oldest stars
- List of least massive stars
- List of hottest stars
- List of coolest stars

== By spectral type or HR class ==
- List of Wolf-Rayet stars
- List of luminous blue variable stars
- List of O-type stars
- List of brown dwarfs
- List of white dwarfs
- List of red dwarfs

== By variability ==
- List of notable variable stars
- List of semiregular variable stars
- List of stars that have unusual dimming periods

== By other factors ==
- List of brightest stars
- List of high-proper-motion stars
- List of stars with multiplanetary systems
- List of blue straggler stars
- List of collapsars (black holes)
- List of supernovae
  - List of supernova candidates
  - List of supernova remnants
  - List of gamma-ray bursts
  - List of most distant supernovae

== By Astronomical catalog ==
- Table of stars with Bayer designations
- Table of stars with Flamsteed designations
- List of stars in the New General Catalogue

== Other star listings ==
- List of extremes in the sky
- List of hypothetical stars
- List of selected stars for navigation
- List of star extremes
- List of stars with resolved images
- Solar twins (Solar analogs)

=== Other stars ===
The following is a list of particularly notable actual or hypothetical stars that have their own articles in Wikipedia, but are not included in the lists above.

- BPM 37093 — a diamond star
- Cygnus X-1 — X-ray source
- EBLM J0555-57Ab — is one of the smallest stars ever discovered.
- GY Andromedae — chemically peculiar variable star
- MACS J1149 Lensed Star 1 (or Icarus) — second most distant star, 9 billion light years away.
- P Cygni — suddenly brightened in the 17th century
- WNC4 — Messier Object 40
- Zeta Boötis — speckle binary test system

== See also ==
- Lists of astronomical objects
- Astronomical naming conventions
- Star
- Star catalogue
- Sun
- Timeline of knowledge about galaxies, clusters of galaxies, and large-scale structure
- Timeline of white dwarfs, neutron stars, and supernovae
- Exoplanet
- Lists of planets
- Lists of exoplanets
