= 2MASS J0523−1403 =

Red dwarf star in the constellation Lepus

Observation data Epoch J2000 Equinox ICRS
- Constellation: Lepus
- Right ascension: 05^{h} 23^{m} 38.2236^{s}
- Declination: −14° 03′ 02.018″
- Apparent magnitude (V): 21.05

Characteristics
- Evolutionary stage: Main sequence
- Spectral type: L2.5

Astrometry
Radial velocity (R_{v})	+12.21±0.09 km/s
Proper motion (μ)	RA: +107.484 mas/yr Dec.: +161.468 mas/yr
Parallax (π)	78.5273±0.1469 mas
Distance	41.53 ± 0.08 ly (12.73 ± 0.02 pc)
Absolute magnitude (M_{V})	20.6

Details
Mass	0.07 M_{☉}
Radius	0.09±0.01 R_{☉}
Luminosity	0.000131±0.000008 L_{☉}
Surface gravity (log g)	5.5 cgs
Temperature	1939±68 K
Rotational velocity (v sin i)	21 km/s

Other designations
- 2MASS J05233822−1403022, 2MUCD 10390, 2MASSI J0523382−140302, USNO-B1.0 0759−00062850

Database references
SIMBAD	data

2MASS J0523−1403 is a very-low-mass red dwarf about 40 light-years (12.2 parsecs) from Earth in the southern constellation of Lepus, with a very faint visual magnitude of 21.05 and a low effective temperature of about 1939 K. It is visible primarily in large telescopes sensitive to infrared light. 2MASS J0523−1403 was first observed as part of the Two Micron All-Sky Survey (2MASS).

== Characteristics ==
2MASS J0523−1403 has a bolometric luminosity of 0.000131 L_{☉}, a radius of 0.09 R_{☉}, and an effective temperature of 1939 K. This makes this star one of the smallest and coolest main sequence stars. It has a stellar classification of L2.5 and a V−K color index of 9.42. Observation with the Hubble Space Telescope has detected no companion beyond 0.15 arcsecond. Sporadic radio emissions were detected by the VLA in 2004. H-alpha (Hα) emissions have also been detected, a sign of chromospheric activity.

Members of the RECONS group have identified 2MASS J0523−1403 as representative of the smallest possible stars. Its small radius is at the local minimums of the radius–luminosity and radius–temperature trends. This local minimum is predicted to occur at the hydrogen burning limit due to differences in the radius-mass relationships of stars and brown dwarfs. Unlike hydrogen-burning stars, brown dwarfs decrease in radius as mass increases due to their cores being supported by degeneracy pressure. As the mass increases an increasing fraction of the brown dwarf is degenerate causing the radius to shrink as mass increases. The minimum stellar mass is estimated to be between 0.07 and 0.077 M_{☉}, comparable to the estimated mass of 2MASS J0523−1403 of 0.07 M_{☉}.

== See also ==
- OGLE-TR-122B
- OGLE-TR-123B
- EBLM J0555-57Ab
- VB 10
