= ESIS =

ESIS may refer to:

- Element Structure Information Set
- European Space Information System
- European chemical Substances Information System
- European Structural Integrity Society
