= HD 191806 b =

Exoplanet in the constellation Cygnus

Discovery
- Discovered by: R. F. Díaz et al.
- Discovery site: Haute-Provence Observatory
- Discovery date: April 26, 2016
- Detection method: Transit method

Orbital characteristics
- Semi-major axis: 2.749+0.106 −0.118 AU
- Eccentricity: 0.213+0.029 −0.028
- Orbital period (sidereal): 4.390+0.027 −0.031 yr
- Inclination: 66.519°+5.830° −4.851°
- Longitude of ascending node: 160.537°+12.338° −12.970°
- Time of periastron: 2451758.874+43.595 −33.839
- Argument of periastron: 346.184°+5.623° −5.388°
- Semi-amplitude: 144.660+3.416 −2.931 m/s
- Star: HD 191806

Physical characteristics
- Mass: 9.334+0.919 −0.852 M_{J}

HD 191806 b is an exoplanet orbiting HD 191806, a K-type star. It has a minimum mass 8.52 times that of Jupiter. It does not orbit within the habitable zone. In 2022, the inclination and true mass of HD 191806 b were measured via astrometry.
