= HD 82205 =

Star in the constellation Antlia

Observation data Epoch J2000.0 Equinox J2000.0 (ICRS)
- Constellation: Antlia
- Right ascension: 09^{h} 29^{m} 54.5048^{s}
- Declination: −26° 35′ 22.6154″
- Apparent magnitude (V): 5.48±0.01

Characteristics
- Spectral type: K3 III
- B−V color index: +1.36

Astrometry
| Radial velocity (R_{v}) | 12±2 km/s |
| Proper motion (μ) | RA: −21.883 mas/yr Dec.: +0.761 mas/yr |
| Parallax (π) | 4.0447±0.0731 mas |
| Distance | 810 ± 10 ly (247 ± 4 pc) |
| Absolute magnitude (M_{V}) | −1.42 |

Details
| Mass | 4.46 M_{☉} |
| Radius | 38.86 R_{☉} |
| Luminosity | 552 L_{☉} |
| Surface gravity (log g) | 1.61±0.01 cgs |
| Temperature | 4,413±122 K |
| Metallicity [Fe/H] | +0.09 dex |
| Rotational velocity (v sin i) | <1 km/s |

Other designations
- 3 G. Antliae, CD−26°7117, GC 13110, HD 82205, HR 3770, SAO 177546, WDS J09299-2635A

Database references
| SIMBAD | data |

HD 82205 (HR 3770) is a solitary star in the southern constellation Antlia. It is faintly visible to the naked eye with an apparent magnitude of 5.48 and is estimated to be 810 light years distant based on parallax measurements. However, it is receding with a heliocentric radial velocity of 12 km/s.

HD 82205 has a general stellar classification of K3 III, indicating that it is a red giant. However, Houk and Cowley (1982) found a slightly warmer class of K2 III CNII, which also suggests a strong overabundance of cyano radicals in the stellar atmosphere. At present it has 4.46 times the mass of the Sun but has expanded to 38.9 times its girth. It shines with a luminosity of 552 L_{☉} from its enlarged photosphere at an effective temperature of 4,413 K, giving an orange hue. HD 82205 has a metallicity 123% that of the Sun and is believed to be a member of the thin disk population. Currently, it spins with a projected rotational velocity lower than 1 km/s.

There is a 14th magnitude optical companion separated 12.4 arcseconds away along a position angle of 131°. The object was first noticed by T.J.J See in 1897.
