= HD 92589 =

Double star in the constellation Antlia

Observation data Epoch J2000.0 Equinox J2000.0 (ICRS)
- Constellation: Antlia
- Right ascension: 10^{h} 40^{m} 51.5391^{s}
- Declination: −35° 44′ 30.176″
- Apparent magnitude (V): 6.39±0.01

Characteristics
- Spectral type: G8/K0 III + F/G
- U−B color index: +0.02
- B−V color index: +0.92

Astrometry
Radial velocity (R_{v})	11±5.4 km/s
Proper motion (μ)	RA: −25.072 mas/yr Dec.: +5.872 mas/yr
Parallax (π)	5.5014±0.1586 mas
Distance	590 ± 20 ly (182 ± 5 pc)
Absolute magnitude (M_{V})	−0.78

Details

A
Mass	2.3 M_{☉}
Radius	13.07 R_{☉}
Luminosity	141 L_{☉}
Surface gravity (log g)	2.54 cgs
Temperature	5,171±122 K
Metallicity [Fe/H]	−0.29 dex
Rotational velocity (v sin i)	1.6±1.2 km/s

B
Mass	2.96 M_{☉}

Other designations
- 76 G. Antliae, CD−35°6646, CPD−35°4320, FK5 2586, HD 92589, HIP 52273, HR 4183, SAO 201631, WDS J10409-3545

Database references
SIMBAD	data

HD 92589 (HR 4183) is a double star in the constellation Antlia. The system has a combined apparent magnitude of 6.39, placing it near the limit of naked eye visibility. The system is located about 590 light years away based on its parallax shift and has a heliocentric radial velocity of 11 km/s. This indicates that it is drifting away from the Solar System.

The system has a composite stellar classification of G8/K0 III + F/G. This indicates that the primary spectrum intermediate between a G8 and K0 giant star while the companion is probably a F-type or G-type star. As of 1991, the pair have a projected separation of 700 mas along a position angle of 48°. Both stars take 1,591 years to orbit each other.

At present the visible component has 2.3 times the mass of the Sun but has expanded to 13.07 times its girth. It shines with a luminosity 141 times greater than the Sun from its enlarged photosphere at an effective temperature of 5,171 K, which gives the yellow hue of a G-type star. HD 92589A is metal-deficient, with an iron abundance only 51% that of the Sun and spins leisurely with a projected rotational velocity of 1.6 km/s, common for giant stars.
