= Delta Antliae =

Star in the constellation Antlia

δ Antliae
- Location of δ Antliae (circled)

Observation data Epoch J2000 Equinox ICRS
- Constellation: Antlia
- Right ascension: 10^{h} 29^{m} 35.379^{s}
- Declination: −30° 36′ 25.43″
- Apparent magnitude (V): +5.55 (5.58/9.65)

Characteristics
- Spectral type: B9.5 V + F9 Ve
- U−B color index: −0.18
- B−V color index: −0.04

Astrometry
| Radial velocity (R_{v}) | +14 km/s |
| Proper motion (μ) | RA: −29.598 mas/yr Dec.: +1.704 mas/yr |
| Parallax (π) | 7.0076±0.2204 mas |
| Distance | 470 ± 10 ly (143 ± 4 pc) |
| Absolute magnitude (M_{V}) | –0.37 |

Details

δ Ant A
| Mass | 3.35±0.15 M_{☉} |
| Luminosity | 200 L_{☉} |
| Temperature | 11,117 K |
| Rotational velocity (v sin i) | 27 km/s |
| Age | 214 Myr |

δ Ant B
| Mass | 1.22–1.31 M_{☉} |
| Luminosity | 2.58 L_{☉} |
| Temperature | 5,948 K |

Other designations
- δ Ant, Del Ant, NSV 4876, CD−29 8383, HD 90972, HIP 51376, HR 4118, SAO 201442, PPM 287759

Database references
| SIMBAD | data |

Delta Antliae is a binary star system in the southern constellation of Antlia. Its Bayer designation is Latinized from δ Antliae, and is abbreviated Del Ant or δ Ant, respectively. The combined apparent visual magnitude of the system is +5.57, allowing it to be viewed from the suburbs with the naked eye. Based on the parallax shift of this system, it is located at a distance of approximately 470 light-years from Earth. The system is reduced in magnitude by 0.03 due to extinction caused by intervening gas and dust.

The primary component of the system has a stellar classification of B9.5 V, indicating that it is a B-type main sequence star. This star has an estimated 3.4 times the mass of the Sun. It is radiating around 200 times as much luminosity as the Sun from its photosphere at an effective temperature of 11,117 K. At this heat, it shines with the characteristic blue-white hue of a B-type star. The companion is an F-type main sequence star with a classification of F9 Ve, where the 'e' indicates that there are emission lines in the spectrum.

This is a young system with age estimates of 120 and 214 million years, with the secondary still in the post T Tauri stage. The two stars are separated by 11 arcseconds, corresponding to a physical separation of about 2,200 AU.
