= HD 93905 =

Star in the constellation Antlia

- Location of HD 93905 (circled)

Observation data Epoch J2000 Equinox ICRS
- Constellation: Antlia
- Right ascension: 10^{h} 49^{m} 57.0188^{s}
- Declination: −34° 03′ 29.451″
- Apparent magnitude (V): 5.61

Characteristics
- Evolutionary stage: main sequence
- Spectral type: A1 V
- U−B color index: +0.05
- B−V color index: +0.04

Astrometry
Radial velocity (R_{v})	−9.5±1.3 km/s
Proper motion (μ)	RA: −41.069 mas/yr Dec.: +5.845 mas/yr
Parallax (π)	8.7989±0.1617 mas
Distance	371 ± 7 ly (114 ± 2 pc)
Absolute magnitude (M_{V})	0.00

Details
Mass	2.78±0.05 M_{☉}
Radius	3.89 R_{☉}
Luminosity	101±9 L_{☉}
Surface gravity (log g)	3.77 cgs
Temperature	8995+125 −123 K
Rotational velocity (v sin i)	85 km/s
Age	256±6 Myr

Other designations
- 80 G. Antliae, CD−33°7288, CPD−33°2973, HD 93905, HIP 52965, HR 4238, SAO 201805

Database references
SIMBAD	data

HD 93905 (HR 4238) is a solitary star located in the southern constellation Antlia. The star has an absolute magnitude of 0 and an apparent magnitude of 5.61, making it faintly visible to the naked eye under ideal conditions. The star is located 371 light years away based on its parallax shift and is drifting closer with a helocentric radial velocity of −9.6 km/s.

This star has a classification of A1 V, which indicates that it is an ordinary A-type main-sequence star that is fusing hydrogen at its core. At present it has 2.78 times the mass of the Sun but is large and over luminous for its class with 3.89 times and 101 times the radius and luminosity of the Sun respectively. This is because HD 93905 has already completed most of its main sequence lifetime at an age of 256 million years. HD 93905 has a surface temperature of 8,895 K and spins quickly with a projected rotational velocity of 85 km/s.
