= European Space Information System =

The European Space Information System (ESIS) project was initiated in 1988 as a service for homogeneous access to heterogeneous databases on the network. At the time, DECNET, EARN and Bitnet were the main academic links. The project pre-dated the World Wide Web, which immensely pushed technology in 1993 to allow homogeneous access to data.

Initially, the ESIS project was to link databases of the European Space Agency together with centres of excellence that included the Centre de Données astronomiques de Strasbourg and its SIMBAD service, the European Southern Observatory and the Canadian Astronomical Data Centre (CADC), as well as the Rutherford Appleton Laboratory for Space Physics data

The outcome of the project yielded a set of applications to browse catalogues, access images, spectra and lightcurves, as well as access to bibliographic information. The main astronomical missions that influenced ESIS at the time were the Hubble Space Telescope, EXOSAT and IUE, while Space Physics was mainly focused on the Cluster mission.

Having been a pioneer project in its days, many of the original concepts used then (such as catalogue browsing, searching in an area of the sky) were later embedded in other astronomical data services worldwide. ESIS provided the building blocks and the prototypes to what is today being implemented in the Virtual Observatory projects, such as the Astrophysical Virtual Observatory.

The greatest success of ESIS was the transfer of its Catalogue Browser to the CDS, which later became better known as the VizieR Catalogue Service.

In recent years, the ESIS concept, which was decades ahead of its time, is reflected in the ESA Sky tool encompassing over 75 space missions and multiple data archives giving a unified access to multiple wavelength astronomy data. Also, TOPCAT, a specialised Astronomical tool for the scientific community is one of the many providing uniform access to data from data archives worldwide.

== See also ==
- VizieR
- Astrophysical Virtual Observatory
- ESA
- ESASky
