= HD 92845 =

Star in the constellation Antlia

Observation data Epoch J2000.0 Equinox ICRS
- Constellation: Antlia
- Right ascension: 10^{h} 42^{m} 43.1844^{s}
- Declination: −32° 42′ 56.413″
- Apparent magnitude (V): 5.62±0.01

Characteristics
- Evolutionary stage: subgiant
- Spectral type: A0 V
- B−V color index: +0.00

Astrometry
Radial velocity (R_{v})	4.5±0.5 km/s
Proper motion (μ)	RA: −28.903 mas/yr Dec.: +1.262 mas/yr
Parallax (π)	4.1113±0.2655 mas
Distance	790 ± 50 ly (240 ± 20 pc)
Absolute magnitude (M_{V})	−0.67

Details
Mass	3.1±0.1 M_{☉}
Radius	5.31 R_{☉}
Luminosity	206^{+72}_{−53} L_{☉}
Surface gravity (log g)	3.5 cgs
Temperature	9,376±109 K
Metallicity [Fe/H]	0.00 dex
Rotational velocity (v sin i)	81±3 km/s
Age	282±34 Myr

Other designations
- 78 G. Antilae, CD−32°7572, CPD−32°2953, FK5 1277, GC 14732, HIP 52407, HR 4194, SAO 201665, WDS J10427-3243A

Database references
SIMBAD	data

HD 92845 (HR 4194) is a probable astrometric binary in the southern constellation Antlia. It has an apparent magnitude of 5.62, allowing it to be faintly seen with the naked eye. Parallax measurements place the system at a distance of 790 light years and it is currently receding with a heliocentric radial velocity of 4.5 km/s.

HD 92845 has a stellar classification of A0 V, indicating that it is an ordinary A-type main-sequence star. However, stellar evolution models from Zorec and Royer reveal it to be a subgiant that has just left the main sequence. It has 3.1 times the mass of the Sun but has expanded to an enlarged radius of 5.31 R_{☉}. It radiates with a luminosity 206 times greater than the Sun from its photosphere at an effective temperature of 9,376 K, giving a white hue. At an age of 282 million years, HD 92845 spins quickly with a projected rotational velocity of 81 km/s.

There is an optical companion 17″ away along a position angle of 214° as of 1999.
