= HD 204018 =

Visual binary in Microscopium

- location of HD 204018 (circled)

Observation data Epoch J2000.0 Equinox ICRS
- Constellation: Microscopium
- A
- Right ascension: 21^{h} 27^{m} 01.62303^{s}
- Declination: −42° 32′ 52.5560″
- Apparent magnitude (V): 5.58±0.01
- B
- Right ascension: 21^{h} 27^{m} 01.75500^{s}
- Declination: −42° 32′ 55.0458″
- Apparent magnitude (V): 8.09±0.01

Characteristics

A
- Evolutionary stage: subgiant
- Spectral type: kA4 hF0 V mF6
- U−B color index: +0.15
- B−V color index: +0.39

B
- Evolutionary stage: main sequence
- Spectral type: F8 V
- U−B color index: +0.06
- B−V color index: +0.55

Astrometry
Radial velocity (R_{v})	18.3±2.8 km/s

A
Proper motion (μ)	RA: −48.257 mas/yr Dec.: +13.160 mas/yr
Parallax (π)	18.489±0.0498 mas
Distance	176.4 ± 0.5 ly (54.1 ± 0.1 pc)
Absolute magnitude (M_{V})	+1.74

B
Proper motion (μ)	RA: −53.002 mas/yr Dec.: +15.410 mas/yr
Parallax (π)	18.5325±0.0349 mas
Distance	176.0 ± 0.3 ly (54.0 ± 0.1 pc)
Absolute magnitude (M_{V})	+4.00

Details

A
Mass	1.73 M_{☉}
Radius	1.09 R_{☉}
Luminosity	12.8 L_{☉}
Surface gravity (log g)	3.86±0.08 cgs
Temperature	6,778 K
Rotational velocity (v sin i)	85 km/s
Age	1.36±0.19 Gyr

B
Mass	1.02 M_{☉}
Radius	1.09±0.21 R_{☉}
Luminosity	1.29 L_{☉}
Surface gravity (log g)	4.29 cgs
Temperature	6,235±115 K
Metallicity [Fe/H]	−0.11 dex
Rotational velocity (v sin i)	72.8 km/s
Age	3.46 Gyr

Other designations
- 69 G. Microscopii, CD−43°14539, CPD−43°9451, GC 30021, HD 204018, HIP 105913, HR 8202, SAO 230692, WDS J21270-4233AB

Database references
SIMBAD	The system
- A
- B

HD 204018, also designated as HR 8202, is a visual binary located in the southern constellation of Microscopium. The primary has an apparent magnitude of 5.58, making it faintly visible to the naked eye under ideal conditions. The companion has an apparent magnitude of 8.09. The system is located relatively close at a distance of 176 light years based on Gaia DR3 parallax measurements but is receding with a heliocentric radial velocity of 18.3 km/s. At its current distance, HD 204018's combined brightness is diminished by 0.13 magnitudes due to interstellar dust.

HD 204018A is an Am star with a stellar classification of kA4hF0 VmF6, indicating that it has the calcium K-line of an A4 star, the hydrogen lines of a F0 main-sequence star and the metallic lines of a F6 star. It has 1.73 imes the mass of the Sun and 2.42 times the Sun's radius. It radiates 12.8 times the luminosity of the Sun from its photosphere at an effective temperature of 6,778 K, giving it a yellowish-white hue. At an age of 1.5 billion years, HD 2014018A is estimated to be on the subgiant branch. An alternate model places it on the main sequence at an age of 1,35 billion years. The object spins at a moderate speed with a projected rotational velocity of 85 km/s.

The companion is an F8 main sequence star located 2 1/2" away along a position angle of 151°. It has an angular diameter of 0.186±0.035 arcseconds, which yields a radius of 1.09 R_{☉} at its estimated distance. It has 102% times the mass of the Sun and an effective temperature of 6,235 K. HD 204018B is estimated to be 3.46 billion years old and is slightly metal deficient.

There is a magnitude 12 co-moving companion located 295.3" away from the system along a position angle of 75°. It is a red dwarf with an estimated spectral class of K6 and any orbit would take over a million years.
