= HD 191806 =

Star in the constellation Cygnus

Observation data Epoch J2000.0 Equinox ICRS
- Constellation: Cygnus
- Right ascension: 20^{h} 09^{m} 28.30936^{s}
- Declination: +52° 16′ 34.8000″
- Apparent magnitude (V): 8.08±0.01

Characteristics
- Evolutionary stage: subgiant
- Spectral type: rG0V (Note: the 'r' prefix is a non-standard notation indicating a metal-rich spectrum)
- B−V color index: +0.63

Astrometry
| Radial velocity (R_{v}) | −15.33±0.13 km/s |
| Proper motion (μ) | RA: 114.022±0.022 mas/yr Dec.: 91.296±0.022 mas/yr |
| Parallax (π) | 15.1975±0.0182 mas |
| Distance | 214.6 ± 0.3 ly (65.80 ± 0.08 pc) |
| Absolute magnitude (M_{V}) | +3.89 |

Details
| Mass | 1.1±0.1 M_{☉} |
| Radius | 1.48^{+0.14}_{−0.13} R_{☉} |
| Luminosity | 2.23±0.16 L_{☉} |
| Surface gravity (log g) | 4.15±0.15 cgs |
| Temperature | 5,894^{+155}_{−86} K |
| Metallicity [Fe/H] | +0.30±0.02 dex |
| Rotation | 20.6±6.9 d |
| Rotational velocity (v sin i) | 3.3 km/s |
| Age | 2.9±0.4 Gyr |

Other designations
- AG+52°1354, BD+51°2782, HD 191806, HIP 99306, SAO 32320

Database references
| SIMBAD | data |
| Exoplanet Archive | data |

HD 191806 is a star located in the northern constellation Cygnus. With an apparent magnitude of 8.093, it's undetectable with the naked eye, but can be seen with binoculars. HD 191806 is currently placed at a distance of 215 light years based on parallax measurements and is drifting towards the Solar System with a spectroscopic radial velocity of −15.28 km/s.

HD 191806 has a stellar classification of G0V, indicating that it is a G-type main sequence star. It has 110% the mass of the Sun and a slightly enlarged radius of 1.48 R_{☉}. It radiates at 2.23 times the luminosity of the Sun from its photosphere at an effective temperature of 5,894 K, giving a yellow hue. HD 191806 is estimated to be about 3 billion years old and has a metallicity nearly twice of the Sun's. It spins with a projected rotational velocity of 3.3 km/s, which corresponds to a rotational period of 21 days.

== Planetary system ==
Observations for exoplanets orbiting the star began in 2007 when it was selected by the N2K Consortium as a potential host due to its high metallicity. After ten years of, a team of astronomers found a super Jupiter orbiting the star. The star has a secular acceleration of >11 km/s, suggesting either the presence of a stellar companion or another planet. In 2022, the inclination and true mass of HD 191806 b were measured via astrometry.

The HD 191806 planetary system
| Companion (in order from star) | Mass | Semimajor axis (AU) | Orbital period (years) | Eccentricity | Inclination (°) | Radius |
|---|---|---|---|---|---|---|
| b | 9.334+0.919 −0.852 M_{J} | 2.749+0.106 −0.118 | 4.390+0.027 −0.031 | 0.213+0.029 −0.028 | 66.519+5.830 −4.851 | — |

== See also ==
- List of extrasolar planets
