= Gliese 412 =

Binary star system in the constellation Ursa Major

Gliese 412 A/B
- Location of Gliese 412 in the constellation Ursa Major

Observation data Epoch J2000 Equinox ICRS
- Constellation: Ursa Major
- Gliese 412 A
- Right ascension: 11^{h} 05^{m} 28.57695^{s}
- Declination: +43° 31′ 36.3869″
- Apparent magnitude (V): 8.68
- Gliese 412 B
- Right ascension: 11^{h} 05^{m} 30.88558^{s}
- Declination: +43° 31′ 17.8852″
- Apparent magnitude (V): 14.45

Characteristics

Gliese 412 A
- Spectral type: M1.0V
- U−B color index: +1.16
- B−V color index: +1.54

Gliese 412 B
- Spectral type: M6.0V
- B−V color index: +2.08

Astrometry

Gliese 412 A
Radial velocity (R_{v})	+68.41±0.12 km/s
Proper motion (μ)	RA: −4,406.469 mas/yr Dec.: +938.527 mas/yr
Parallax (π)	203.8876±0.0332 mas
Distance	15.997 ± 0.003 ly (4.9047 ± 0.0008 pc)
Absolute magnitude (M_{V})	10.34

Gliese 412 B
Radial velocity (R_{v})	+67.94±0.74 km/s
Proper motion (μ)	RA: −4,339.850 mas/yr Dec.: +960.696 mas/yr
Parallax (π)	203.8323±0.0500 mas
Distance	16.001 ± 0.004 ly (4.906 ± 0.001 pc)
Absolute magnitude (M_{V})	16.05

Details

Gliese 412 A
Mass	0.387±0.010 M_{☉}
Radius	0.398±0.009 R_{☉}
Luminosity	0.0223±0.0004 L_{☉}
Surface gravity (log g)	4.860±0.031 cgs
Temperature	3,639±51 K
Metallicity [Fe/H]	−0.30±0.16 dex
Rotation	36.9±2.5 d
Rotational velocity (v sin i)	<3 km/s
Age	3 Gyr

Gliese 412 B
Mass	0.0952±0.0095 M_{☉}
Radius	0.1262±0.0054 R_{☉}
Luminosity	0.000915±0.000024 L_{☉}
Temperature	2,863±60 K
Metallicity [Fe/H]	−0.32±0.08 dex
Rotational velocity (v sin i)	7.7±1.7 km/s

Other designations
- BD+44°2051, GJ 412, CCDM J11055+4332AB, WDS J11055+4332AB A: HIP 54211, SAO 43609, G 176-11, LAL 21258, LFT 757, LHS 38, LTT 12976, NLTT 26245, Gaia DR2 778947814402405120 B: WX UMa, G 176-12, LFT 758, LHS 39, LTT 12977, NLTT 26247, Gaia DR2 778947608243864320

Database references
SIMBAD	A
- B

Gliese 412 is a binary star system in the constellation Ursa Major. Among the nearest stars, they lie at a distance of 16.0 light-years (4.9 parsecs). The pair have an angular separation of 31.4″ at a position angle of 126.1°. Both components are relatively dim red dwarf stars.

== History of observations ==
This system, also known as Lalande 21258, was announced in 1860 as a high apparent proper motion star by Friedrich Wilhelm Argelander as a result of work on the Bonner Durchmusterung (BD). Adalbert Krueger, an assistant to the BD project, was tasked with measuring its parallax. In Krueger's paper reporting the result, he dubbed it Argelander's Third Star.

The primary star was monitored for radial velocity (RV) variations caused by a Jupiter-mass companion in a short-period orbit. It displayed no significant excess of RV variation that could be attributed to a planet. A search of the system using near-infrared speckle interferometry also failed to detect a companion orbiting at distances of 1–10 AU. Nor has a brown dwarf been detected orbiting within this system.

== Characteristics ==
The two stellar components of this system have a projected separation of about 152 AU, and an estimated orbital semimajor axis of 190 AU. From the B component, the A component would appear about as bright as a First Quarter Moon. From the A component, the B component would appear as bright as Venus seen from Earth.

The primary has 0.387 times the mass of the Sun, 0.398 times the Sun's radius and 2.23% of the Sun's luminosity. It is spinning at a rotation velocity at the equator of less than 3 km/s. The secondary is smaller and fainter, at 9.52% of the Sun's mass, 12.62% of the Sun's radius and luminosity only 0.09% solar. It is spinning at a rotation velocity of 7.7±1.7 km/s. Gliese 412 A has a temperature of 3,639 K, while Gliese 412 B has 2,863 K.

The space velocity components of this system are U = 141, V = –7 and W = 7. They are members of the halo population of the Milky Way galaxy.

== X-ray source ==
The secondary is a flare star that is referred to as WX Ursae Majoris. It is characterized as a UV Ceti-type variable star that displays infrequent increases in luminosity. This star was observed to flare as early as 1939 by the Dutch astronomer Adriaan van Maanen.

Component B (WX Ursae Majoris) has been identified as an X-ray source, while no significant X-ray emission was detected from component A. This system had not been studied in X-rays prior to ROSAT.

== See also ==
- List of nearest stars
- X-ray astronomy
