= HD 178845 =

Binary star located in the southern constellation Telescopium

- Location of HD 178845 (circled)

Observation data Epoch J2000.0 Equinox ICRS
- Constellation: Telescopium
- A
- Right ascension: 19^{h} 12^{m} 46.13847^{s}
- Declination: −50° 29′ 11.1095″
- Apparent magnitude (V): 6.13
- B
- Right ascension: 19^{h} 12^{m} 45.51968^{s}
- Declination: −50° 29′ 08.7448″
- Apparent magnitude (V): 10.90±0.02

Characteristics

A
- Spectral type: G8 III
- B−V color index: +0.95

Astrometry

A
Radial velocity (R_{v})	−26.4±0.4 km/s
Proper motion (μ)	RA: +44.868 mas/yr Dec.: −42.034 mas/yr
Parallax (π)	8.6125±0.0283 mas
Distance	379 ± 1 ly (116.1 ± 0.4 pc)
Absolute magnitude (M_{V})	+0.68

B
Radial velocity (R_{v})	−24.2±5.3 km/s
Proper motion (μ)	RA: +46.984 mas/yr Dec.: −41.403 mas/yr
Parallax (π)	8.6162±0.024 mas
Distance	379 ± 1 ly (116.1 ± 0.3 pc)

Details

A
Mass	2.35±0.08 M_{☉}
Radius	9.13±0.16 R_{☉}
Luminosity	47±0.9 L_{☉}
Surface gravity (log g)	2.95±0.10 cgs
Temperature	5,001±36 K
Metallicity [Fe/H]	+0.02±0.03 dex
Rotational velocity (v sin i)	2.6±1.1 km/s
Age	455^{+45}_{−46} Myr

Other designations
- 49 G. Telescopii, CD−50°12377, CPD−50°10995, HD 178845, HIP 94398, HR 7271, SAO 245976, CCDM J19128-5029AB, WDS J19128-5029A

Database references
SIMBAD	data

HD 178845, also known as HR 7271 or rarely 49 G. Telescopii, is a binary star located in the southern constellation Telescopium. Gaia DR3 parallax measurements place the system 379 light years away and both components are approaching the Solar System with heliocentric radial velocities of −26 km/s and −24 km/s respectively. At its current distance, HD 178845A's brightness is diminished by 0.22 magnitudes due to interstellar dust.

The primary has an apparent magnitude of 6.13, placing it near the naked eye viewing limit and the companion has an apparent magnitude of 10.9, making it readily visible in medium-sized telescopes. The system was first observed by astronomer Willem Hendrik van den Bos in 1930. As of 1991, HD 178845B is located 7.2" away along a position angle of 320°.

The primary is an evolved red giant with a stellar classification of G8 III. It has 2.35 times the mass of the Sun but at the age of 455 million years, it has expanded to 9.1 times its radius. It radiates 47 times the luminosity of the Sun from its enlarged photosphere at an effective temperature of 5,001 K, giving it a yellow hue. It has a solar metallicity ([Fe/H] = +0.02) and spins modestly with a projected rotational velocity of 2.6 km/s.
