= HD 88836 =

Star in the constellation Antlia

Observation data Epoch J2000.0 Equinox ICRS
- Constellation: Antlia
- Right ascension: 10^{h} 13^{m} 56.55764^{s}
- Declination: −40° 18′ 38.7862″
- Apparent magnitude (V): 6.32±0.01

Characteristics
- Evolutionary stage: red giant branch
- Spectral type: G8 III
- B−V color index: +0.94

Astrometry
Radial velocity (R_{v})	0±0.4 km/s
Proper motion (μ)	RA: −30.210 mas/yr Dec.: −8.448 mas/yr
Parallax (π)	7.0190±0.0167 mas
Distance	465 ± 1 ly (142.5 ± 0.3 pc)
Absolute magnitude (M_{V})	+0.61

Details
Mass	2.32±0.13 M_{☉}
Radius	9.96±0.15 R_{☉}
Luminosity	58.3±1.0 L_{☉}
Surface gravity (log g)	2.78±0.06 cgs
Temperature	5,055±32 K
Metallicity [Fe/H]	−0.02±0.03 dex
Rotational velocity (v sin i)	1.6±1.2 km/s
Age	619 Myr

Other designations
- 56 G. Antliae, CD−39°6225, CPD−39°4270, HD 88836, HIP 50122, HR 4019, SAO 221883, WDS J10139-4019A

Database references
SIMBAD	data

HD 88836, also known as HR 4019, is a solitary, yellow-hued star located in the southern constellation Antlia. It has an apparent magnitude of 6.32, placing it near the limit for naked eye visibility. Based on an annual parallax shift of 7.019 mas, the object is estimated to be 465 light years away from the Solar System. Its distance from the Sun does not appear to be changing, having a radial velocity of 0 km/s.

HD 88836 has a stellar classification of G8 III, indicating that it is an evolved red giant. Gaia Data Release 3 stellar evolution models place it on the red giant branch. At present it has 2.3 times the mass of the Sun but has expanded to 10 times its girth. It shines with a luminosity of 58.3 L_{☉} from its enlarged photosphere at an effective temperature of 5,055 K. HD 88836 metallicity – what astronomers dub as a star's abundance of elements heavier than helium – is around solar level. Like most giants, the object spins slowly, having a projected rotational velocity of 1.6 km/s.

There is a 13th magnitude companion located 10.9″ away along a position angle of 209°, which was first noticed by R.A. Rossiter in 1912. It is unknown if its physically related to HD 88836 or not, although its Gaia Data Release 3 parallax is much smaller than HD 88836's.
