= HD 134439 and HD 134440 =

Pair of runaway stars in the constellation Libra

HD 134439/HD 134440
Observation data Epoch 2015.5 Equinox ICRS
- Constellation: Libra
- HD 134439
- Right ascension: 15^{h} 10^{m} 12.012^{s}
- Declination: −16° 23′ 40.78″
- Apparent magnitude (V): 9.066
- HD 134440
- Right ascension: 15^{h} 10^{m} 11.889^{s}
- Declination: −16° 28′ 41.39″
- Apparent magnitude (V): 9.426

Characteristics

HD 134439
- Evolutionary stage: subdwarf
- Spectral type: sd:K1Fe-1
- Apparent magnitude (U): 10.03
- Apparent magnitude (B): 9.837
- Apparent magnitude (V): 9.066
- Apparent magnitude (R): 8.604
- Apparent magnitude (I): 8.160
- Apparent magnitude (J): 7.70
- Apparent magnitude (H): 7.09
- Apparent magnitude (K): 7.04

HD 134440
- Evolutionary stage: subdwarf
- Spectral type: sdK2.5
- Apparent magnitude (U): 10.69
- Apparent magnitude (B): 10.217
- Apparent magnitude (V): 9.426
- Apparent magnitude (R): 8.913
- Apparent magnitude (I): 8.441
- Apparent magnitude (J): 7.74
- Apparent magnitude (H): 7.27
- Apparent magnitude (K): 7.19

Astrometry

HD 134439
Radial velocity (R_{v})	310.12±0.09 km/s
Total velocity	599.73±0.62 km/s
Proper motion (μ)	RA: −997.999±0.085 mas/yr Dec.: −3542.377±0.061 mas/yr
Parallax (π)	33.987±0.043 mas
Distance	96.0 ± 0.1 ly (29.42 ± 0.04 pc)

HD 134440
Radial velocity (R_{v})	310.77±0 km/s
Total velocity	602.38±0.63 km/s
Proper motion (μ)	RA: −1000.615±0.077 mas/yr Dec.: −3540.223±0.056 mas/yr
Parallax (π)	33.796±0.048 mas
Distance	96.5 ± 0.1 ly (29.59 ± 0.04 pc)

Other designations
- GJ 9511, GJ 579.2, BUP 161
- GJ 9511A: HD 134439, HIP 74235
- GJ9511B: HD 134440, HIP 74234

Database references
SIMBAD	HD 134439
- HD 134440

HD 134439 and HD 134440 are a pair of K-type runaway stars, nearly hypervelocity stars, in the constellation Libra. Although they are roughly 96 ly away, they have one of the highest proper motions of any star in the sky, travelling over 3.5 arcseconds every year.

The stars are believed to originate from outside of the Milky Way, likely from a destroyed, unusually dusty satellite galaxy. They have an extremely low metallicity, only about 3.5% that of the Sun, with unusual chemical abundances very different from those of stars formed anywhere in the galaxy. Because of this, they are considered subdwarfs, and are less luminous than a main-sequence star of the same spectral type would be.

== Binary system ==
It is unknown if HD 134439 and 134440 are actually orbiting each other, as at their distance, they would have to be a minimum 0.14 light-years (8,900 au) apart from each other, which would make them one of the widest binary systems known. Further adding to this, using Gaia data, HD 134440 appears to be 0.54±0.26 light years further than HD 134439, resulting in a true separation of 0.56±0.25 light years from each other. If they are orbiting each other, they would have an orbital period on the scale of 5.3±3 million years, making them one of the longest period binary systems known as well.

== Destroyed planet ==
In a 2018 study, it was found that HD 134440 had a noticeably higher metallicity than HD 134439, which could be potentially explained by the star having engulfed a planet orbiting it, suggesting that it may be possible for planets to form even around stars with extremely low content of planet-forming material.
