= LP 40-365 =

Star in the constellation Ursa Minor

- Tangential movement of LP 40-365 between 1955 and 1995. The field of view is 8 × 8 arcminutes. Credit: Digitized Sky Survey

Observation data Epoch J2000 Equinox ICRS
- Constellation: Ursa Minor
- Right ascension: 14^{h} 06^{m} 35.45^{s}
- Declination: +74° 18′ 58.0″
- Apparent magnitude (V): 15.51 ± 0.09

Characteristics
- Evolutionary stage: White dwarf
- Spectral type: DZ

Astrometry
Radial velocity (R_{v})	498 km/s
Total velocity	~546 km/s
Proper motion (μ)	RA: −49.569±0.029 mas/yr Dec.: 148.642±0.029 mas/yr
Parallax (π)	1.6375±0.0257 mas
Distance	1,990 ± 30 ly (611 ± 10 pc)
Absolute magnitude (M_{V})	8.14+0.60 −0.90

Details
Mass	0.28+0.28 −0.14 M_{☉}
Radius	0.16±0.01 R_{☉}
Surface gravity (log g)	5.50±0.30 cgs
Temperature	9800±300 K
Rotation	8.914122 ± 0.000020 hours
Rotational velocity (v sin i)	30.5 ± 2.0 km/s

Other designations
- 2MASS J14063545+7418579

Database references
SIMBAD	data

LP 40-365 is a low-mass white dwarf star in the constellation Ursa Minor. It travels at high speed through the Milky Way and has a very unusual elemental composition, lacking hydrogen, helium or carbon. It may have been produced in a subluminous Type Iax supernova that failed to destroy its host star totally. The "LP" name is derived from the Luyten-Palomar proper motion catalogue in which it appeared in the 1960s. Another catalog name for this star is "GD 492". The star was cataloged as a Giclas object with the designation "GD 492" being assigned by Henry Giclas in 1970.

The abundance analysis of LP 40-365 did show that the atmosphere is dominated by oxygen and neon, with substantial traces of intermediate-mass elements such as aluminium and silicon. The white dwarf core on the other hand is likely composed of a mix of carbon, oxygen and neon. Additional observations did suggest the atmosphere is dominated by helium. This is in contrast to the previous analysis. Later helium was excluded with high quality spectra for other similar stars and therefore a oxygen-neon dominated atmosphere is favoured for LP 40-365. Neon has the highest mass fraction of below 60%, oxygen has a mass fraction of around 30%, followed by around 8% of magnesium. (Note: These values are measured from figure 13 and are therefore less accurate. General values for LP 40-365-like stars are given in section 5.1.2: Ne (59–65%), O (29–31%), Mg (3–9%).) 11 other elements are detected in the atmosphere, but they make up 1–2% of the mass. The atmospheric composition is a strong indicator of partial carbon-, oxygen- and silicon-burning, likely connected to a thermonuclear explosion that did not entirely disrupt the progenitor. The origin could be either a peculiar Type Iax or electron-capture supernova. In the future LP 40-365 and similar objects are predicted to evolve into oxygen-rich white dwarfs.

The new parallax with Gaia helped to refine the radius to 18% of the radius of the Sun. This is 15 times larger than other white dwarfs. The new kinematic analysis showed that LP 40-365 is leaving the Milky Way with 1.5 times the escape velocity of the solar neighbourhood. The object crossed the galactic disk 5.3±0.5 Ma ago in the direction of Carina, likely coming from beneath the plane. The team estimated that it was ejected with a speed of 600 km/s from its progenitor binary. This speed suggests a close binary consisting of a white dwarf and a helium-star donor. This donor-star had a mass of 0.8 to 1.32 M_{☉} and the binary had an orbital period of 30 to 60 minutes. Today LP 40-365 has a rest-frame velocity of 852±10 km/s. Variability was detected with the help of TESS, Hubble and WISE. TESS in the optical showed an amplitude of 1.0%, Hubble in the ultraviolet showed an amplitude of 5.8% and WISE in the infrared shows an amplitude of around 2.2%. The rotation period was measured at 8.914 hours. The researchers suggest the variations are caused by an inhomogeneity on the surface, rotating in and out of view.

Additional stars with similar characteristics are called LP 40-365 stars, making LP 40-365 the prototype of chemically peculiar runaway stars that are the survivors of thermonuclear explosions.
