= HD 86267 =

Star in the constellation of Antlia

Observation data Epoch J2000.0 Equinox ICRS
- Constellation: Antlia
- Right ascension: 09^{h} 56^{m} 35.4937^{s}
- Declination: −33° 25′ 06.587″
- Apparent magnitude (V): 5.82±0.01

Characteristics
- Evolutionary stage: RGB
- Spectral type: K1 III
- B−V color index: +1.2

Astrometry
| Radial velocity (R_{v}) | 3.7±0.4 km/s |
| Proper motion (μ) | RA: +34.064 mas/yr Dec.: +22.102 mas/yr |
| Parallax (π) | 6.3494±0.0453 mas |
| Distance | 514 ± 4 ly (157 ± 1 pc) |
| Absolute magnitude (M_{V}) | −0.15 |

Details
| Mass | 1.73^{+1.24}_{−0.71} M_{☉} |
| Radius | 19.7 R_{☉} |
| Luminosity | 158±11 L_{☉} |
| Surface gravity (log g) | 1.86 cgs |
| Temperature | 4430±110 K |
| Metallicity [Fe/H] | −0.15 dex |
| Rotational velocity (v sin i) | <1 km/s |

Other designations
- 36 G. Antliae, CD−32°6895, CPD−32°2771, FK5 2796, GC 13695, HD 86267, HIP 48748, HR 3932, SAO 200889

Database references
| SIMBAD | data |

HD 86267, also known as HR 3932, is a solitary orange-hued star located in the southern constellation Antlia. It has an apparent magnitude of 5.82, allowing it to be faintly seen with the naked eye. Parallax measurements place it a distance of 514 light years and it is currently receding with a heliocentric radial velocity of 3.7 km/s.

HD 86267 has a stellar classification of K1 III, indicating that it is a red giant. At present it has 1.73 times the mass of the Sun but has expanded to 19.7 times its girth. It shines with a luminosity of 158 L_{☉} from its enlarged photosphere at an effective temperature of 4,430 K. It is a member of the old disk population, having a metallicity 71% that of the Sun. The value means that it is metal deficient. Its current rotation rate is too low to be measured accurately.
