= HD 88522 =

Star in the constellation Antlia

Observation data Epoch J2000 Equinox ICRS
- Constellation: Antlia
- Right ascension: 10^{h} 12^{m} 02.85179^{s}
- Declination: −28° 36′ 21.4485″
- Apparent magnitude (V): 6.28 (6.78 + 7.41)

Characteristics
- Spectral type: A1 V (A1 V + A2 V)
- B−V color index: 0.019±0.004

Astrometry
Radial velocity (R_{v})	+27.4±0.4 km/s
Proper motion (μ)	RA: −38.74 mas/yr Dec.: −1.24 mas/yr
Parallax (π)	6.55±0.58 mas
Distance	500 ± 40 ly (150 ± 10 pc)
Absolute magnitude (M_{V})	0.86 + 1.49

Orbit
Period (P)	91.89±0.85 yr
Semi-major axis (a)	0.226±0.003″
Eccentricity (e)	0.676±0.012
Inclination (i)	76.0±0.7°
Longitude of the node (Ω)	198.3±0.5°
Periastron epoch (T)	2003.58±0.22
Argument of periastron (ω) (secondary)	59.7±1.1°

Details

HD 88522 A
Mass	2.53 M_{☉}
Luminosity	75.8+16.6 −13.6 L_{☉}
Temperature	9,638+134 −132 K
Rotational velocity (v sin i)	24 km/s

HD 88522 B
Mass	2.17 M_{☉}

Other designations
- CD−27°7266, HD 88522, HIP 49967, HR 4003, SAO 178526, WDS J10120-2836AB

Database references
SIMBAD	data

HD 88522 is a double or multiple star. The component stars are two white stars of similar spectral type—A1V and A2V—and luminosity.
