= HD 96146 =

Binary star in the constellation Antlia

- Location of HD 96146 in red

Observation data Epoch J2000.0 Equinox ICRS
- Constellation: Antlia
- Right ascension: 11^{h} 04^{m} 54.1966^{s}
- Declination: −35° 48′ 16.817″
- Apparent magnitude (V): 5.41±0.01

Characteristics
- Spectral type: A0 V
- B−V color index: +0.03

Astrometry
Radial velocity (R_{v})	−4.66±6.09 km/s
Proper motion (μ)	RA: −24.217 mas/yr Dec.: +4.463 mas/yr
Parallax (π)	4.6163±0.4323 mas
Distance	710 ± 70 ly (220 ± 20 pc)
Absolute magnitude (M_{V})	−0.55

Details
Mass	3.84 M_{☉}
Radius	6.17 R_{☉}
Luminosity	218^{+47}_{−37} L_{☉}
Surface gravity (log g)	3.46 cgs
Temperature	9,750^{+113}_{−112} K
Metallicity [Fe/H]	+0.07 dex
Rotational velocity (v sin i)	10±1 km/s
Age	291^{+22}_{−21} Myr

Other designations
- 85 G. Antliae, CD−35°6954, CPD−35°4592, FK5 2885, GC 15238, HD 96146, HIP 54173, HR 4313, SAO 202067, WDS J11049-3548AB

Database references
SIMBAD	data

HD 96146 (HR 4313) is a binary star located in the southern constellation Antlia. The system has a combined apparent magnitude of 5.41, making it visible to the naked eye under ideal conditions. Parallax measurements from the Gaia spacecraft place the pair at a distance of 710 light years with a large margin of error. It is currently receding with a poorly constrained heliocentric radial velocity of 4.7 km/s.

The object's status as a double star was not known until a 1991 Hipparcos survey of double stars. Since the pair's current projected separation is around 0.04 arcseconds, it makes it difficult to distinguish both components. Nevertheless, they are located along a position angle of 226°. The secondary has been observed using speckle interferometry to be 1.8 magnitudes fainter than the visible star.

The primary has a stellar classification of A0 V, indicating that it is an ordinary A-type main-sequence star. Zorec and Royer (2012) model it as a dwarf star that is 99.5% through its main sequence lifetime, close to the subgiant phase. It has 3.84 times the mass of the Sun and an enlarged radius of 6.17 R_{☉}. HD 96146 shines with a luminosity 220 times that of the Sun from its photosphere at an effective temperature of 9,750 K, giving a white hue. HD 96146 is currently 291 million years old and unlike most hot stars, spins modestly with a projected rotational velocity of only 10 km/s.
