= HD 83380 =

Star in the constellation Antlia

- Location of HD 83380 (circled in red)

Observation data Epoch J2000.0 Equinox ICRS
- Constellation: Antlia
- Right ascension: 09^{h} 37^{m} 09.89308^{s}
- Declination: −32° 10′ 43.2374″
- Apparent magnitude (V): 5.62

Characteristics
- Evolutionary stage: red giant branch
- Spectral type: K1 III
- B−V color index: +1.02

Astrometry
Radial velocity (R_{v})	−2.6±0.6 km/s
Proper motion (μ)	RA: +27.757 mas/yr Dec.: −15.640 mas/yr
Parallax (π)	10.4548±0.0533 mas
Distance	312 ± 2 ly (95.6 ± 0.5 pc)
Absolute magnitude (M_{V})	+0.69

Details
Mass	2.17±0.11 M_{☉}
Radius	10.3±0.2 R_{☉}
Luminosity	55.2±1.6 L_{☉}
Surface gravity (log g)	2.9±0.1 cgs
Temperature	4,905±42 K
Metallicity [Fe/H]	+0.10±0.03 dex
Rotational velocity (v sin i)	<1.4 km/s

Other designations
- 17 G. Antliae, CD−31°7458, CPD−31°2797, FK5 1248, HD 83380, HIP 47199, HR 3833, SAO 200561

Database references
SIMBAD	data

HD 83380 (HR 3833) is an orange-hued star in the southern constellation of Antlia. It shines faintly with an apparent magnitude of 5.62 when viewed in ideal conditions. Parallax measurements place the object at distance of 312 light-years. It has a heliocentric radial velocity of −2.6 km/s, indicating that it is drifting towards the Solar System.

HD 83380 has a stellar classification of K1 III, indicating that it is an evolved red giant. Gaia DR3 stellar evolution models place the object on the red giant branch. At present it has 2.17 times the mass of the Sun and an enlarged radius of 10.3 R_{☉}. It shines with a luminosity 55 times greater than the Sun from its photosphere at an effective temperature of 4,905 K. HD 83380 is slightly metal enriched with a metallicity 126% that of the Sun. It spins with a projected rotational velocity too low to be measured accurately, and is believed to be a member of the thin disk population.

The multiplicity status of HD 83380 isn't generally agreed on. De Mederios et al. (2014) found it to be a probable spectroscopic binary while Eggleton and Tokovinin (2008) list it as a solitary star.
