= HD 88809 =

Star in the constellation of Antlia

Observation data Epoch J2000 Equinox ICRS
- Constellation: Antlia
- Right ascension: 10^{h} 13^{m} 45.9269^{s}
- Declination: −40° 20′ 45.683″
- Apparent magnitude (V): 5.893±0.009

Characteristics
- Spectral type: K1 III
- U−B color index: +1.25
- B−V color index: +1.21

Astrometry
Radial velocity (R_{v})	19.96±0.76 km/s
Proper motion (μ)	RA: −79.460 mas/yr Dec.: +2.511 mas/yr
Parallax (π)	7.2269±0.0909 mas
Distance	451 ± 6 ly (138 ± 2 pc)
Absolute magnitude (M_{V})	+0.09

Position (relative to HD 88809A)
Component	HD 88809B
Epoch of observation	J2000.0
Angular distance	4.9″
Position angle	105°
Projected separation	676.2 AU

Details
Mass	1.29+1.20 −0.4 M_{☉}
Radius	17.7 R_{☉}
Luminosity	117±8 L_{☉}
Temperature	4,410±110 K
Metallicity [Fe/H]	−0.2 dex
Rotational velocity (v sin i)	<1.3 km/s
Age	4.9 Gyr

Other designations
- 55 G. Antliae, CD−39°6222, HD 88809, HIP 50103, HR 4015, SAO 22187

Database references
SIMBAD	data

HD 88809 is a star located in the southern constellation Antlia. With an apparent magnitude of 5.89 it is barely visible to the naked eye under ideal conditions. The star is located at a distance of around 451 light years but is drifting away at a heliocentric radial velocity of almost 20 km/s.

HD 88809 has a classification of K1 III which indicates that it is an evolved early K-type giant star that has exhausted hydrogen at its core and left the main sequence. It has an angular diameter of 1.15 mas, which yields a diameter of 17.07 times that of the Sun at its estimated distance. At present HD 88809 has 129% the mass of the Sun and shines with a luminosity approximately 117 times that of the Sun and has a surface temperature of 4,410 K, which gives it an orange glow of a K-type star. HD 88809 has a faint 13th magnitude companion located approximately 4.9″ away.
