= VizieR =

Astronomy objects catalog

The VizieR Catalogue Service is an astronomical catalog service provided by Centre de données astronomiques de Strasbourg (CDS, Strasbourg Data Centre for astronomy). The origin of the service dates back to 1993, when it was founded by the European Space Agency as the European Space Information System (ESIS) Catalogue Browser. Initially intended to serve the space science community, the ESIS project pre-dates the World Wide Web as a network database allowing uniform to a heterogeneous set of catalogues and data.

The CDS had for years collected and disseminated astronomical data, so the original ESIS Catalogue Browser was transferred to and stored there. Since its inception in 1996, VizieR has become a reference point for astronomers worldwide engaged in research, who come to access catalogued data regularly published in astronomical journals. The new VizieR service was refurbished in 1997 by the CDS to better serve the community in terms of searching capabilities and data volume. As of February 2021 it contains more than 20000 catalogues. It is a major data source as part of the Virtual Observatory.

== Literature ==
- Ochsenbein, F.; Bauer, P.; Marcout, J. (2000). "The VizieR database of astronomical catalogues". Astronomy and Astrophysics Supplement Series. 143: 23–32. arXiv:astro-ph/0002122. Bibcode:2000A&AS..143...23O. doi:10.1051/aas:2000169. S2CID 17377096.
- Ansari, S.G.; Donzelli, P.; Simonsen, E.; Ochsenbein, F. (May 1996). "Transfer of ESIS to Scientific Institutes". ESA Bulletin (86): 43. Bibcode:1996ESABu..86...43A.
- Ochsenbein, F.; Genova, F.; Egret, D.; Bourekeb, I.; Sadat, R.; Ansari, S. G.; Simonsen, E. (1995). "A new research tool to retrieve data from astronomical catalogues and tables". American Astronomical Society Meeting Abstracts. 187: 91.03. Bibcode:1995AAS...187.9103O.
- Ochsenbein, F. (1996). "VizieR, the new catalogue interface at CDS". Bulletin d'Information du Centre de Données Stellaires. 48: 47. Bibcode:1996BICDS..48...47O.
