= HD 82514 =

Star in the constellation of Antlia

Observation data Epoch J2000.0 Equinox ICRS
- Constellation: Antlia
- Right ascension: 09^{h} 31^{m} 33.04573^{s}
- Declination: −35° 42′ 53.0974″
- Apparent magnitude (V): 5.86

Characteristics
- Evolutionary stage: red giant branch
- Spectral type: K3 III
- B−V color index: +1.29

Astrometry
Radial velocity (R_{v})	+14.3 km/s
Proper motion (μ)	RA: +156.211 mas/yr Dec.: −172.814 mas/yr
Parallax (π)	11.69±0.0384 mas
Distance	279.0 ± 0.9 ly (85.5 ± 0.3 pc)
Absolute magnitude (M_{V})	+1.20

Details
Mass	1.09^{+0.69}_{−0.26} M_{☉}
Radius	11.6 R_{☉}
Luminosity	65 L_{☉}
Surface gravity (log g)	2.26 cgs
Temperature	4,300±110 K
Metallicity [Fe/H]	+0.16 dex
Rotational velocity (v sin i)	<1 km/s

Other designations
- 11 G. Antliae, CD−35°5751, GC 13154, HD 82514, HIP 46736, HR 3790, SAO 200462, WDS J09316-3543A

Database references
SIMBAD	data

HD 82514, also known as HR 3790, is a solitary, orange-hued star located in the southern constellation Antlia. It has an apparent magnitude of 5.86, allowing it to be faintly seen with the naked eye. Based on parallax measurements from the Gaia spacecraft, it is estimated to be 279 light years away from the Solar System. However, it is receding with a heliocentric radial velocity of 14.3 km/s.

HD 82514 has a stellar classification of K3 III, indicating that it is an evolved red giant. It has a comparable mass to the Sun, but as a result of its evolved state, it has an enlarged radius of 11.6 R_{☉}. It radiates at 65 times the luminosity of the Sun from its photosphere at an effective temperature of roughly 4,300 K. It spins slowly with a projected rotational velocity of <1 km/s, which is common for most giant stars. HD 82514 has an iron abundance 44% above solar levels, making it metal enriched. The star is believed to be a member of the thick disk.

There is a 13th magnitude companion located 50.9″ away along a position angle of 299°. This object is designated as CD −35°5751BC, which makes it a double star itself. It consists of two low mass stars separated by 2.3 " from each other. However, the system is not related to HD 82514, having a smaller parallax. HD 82514 is located within the boundaries of the open cluster Turner 5. However, it is only a field star.
