= OGLE-TR-123 =

Star in the constellation Carina

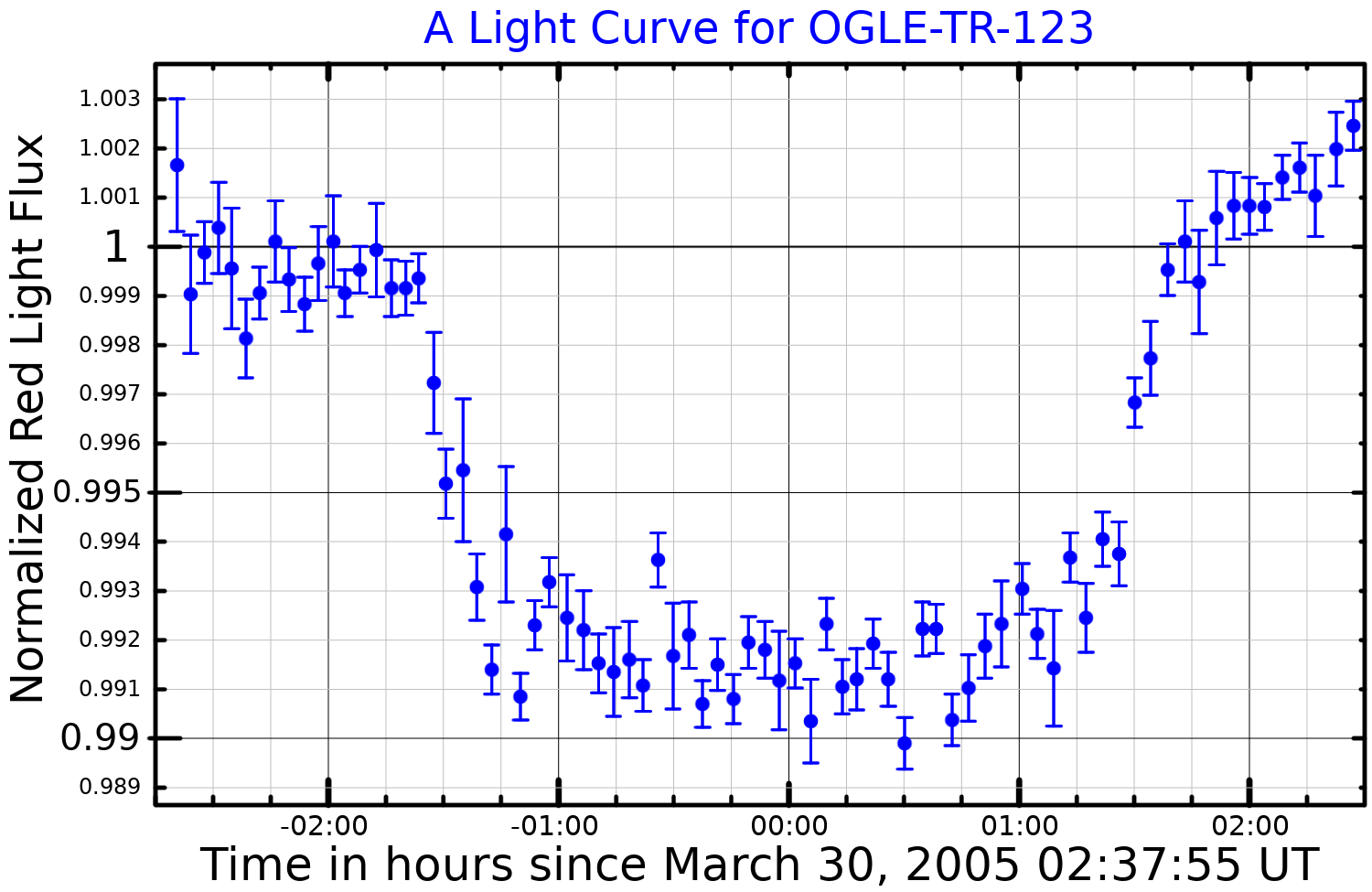
- A light curve showing the March 30, 2005 planet transit across OGLE-TR-123. Adapted from Pont et al. (2006)

Observation data Epoch J2000.0 Equinox ICRS
- Constellation: Carina
- Right ascension: 11^{h} 06^{m} 51.19^{s}
- Declination: −61° 11′ 10.1″
- Apparent magnitude (V): 16.2

Characteristics
- Spectral type: F (primary)/M (b)
- Apparent magnitude (I): 15.40 (system)
- Variable type: Algol

Astrometry
Distance	5,000±1,000 ly (1,600±400 pc)

Orbit
Period (P)	1.804 days
Semi-major axis (a)	0.031±0.002 AU
Eccentricity (e)	0
Inclination (i)	86–90°°

Details

OGLE-TR-123A
Mass	1.3 M_{☉}
Radius	1.55 R_{☉}
Temperature	6,700±300 K

OGLE-TR-123b
Mass	0.085 M_{☉}
Radius	0.13 R_{☉}

Other designations
- V816 Car, 2MASS J11065112-6111103

Database references
SIMBAD	data

OGLE-TR-123 is a binary stellar system containing one of the smallest main-sequence stars whose radius has been measured. It was discovered when the Optical Gravitational Lensing Experiment (OGLE) survey observed the smaller star eclipsing the larger primary. The orbital period is approximately 1.80 days.

== OGLE-TR-123B ==
The smaller star, OGLE-TR-123B, is estimated to have a radius around 0.13 solar radii, and a mass of around 0.085 solar masses (M_{☉}), or approximately 90 times Jupiter's. OGLE-TR-123b's mass is close to the lowest possible mass, estimated to be around 0.07 or 0.08 M_{☉}, for a hydrogen-fusing star.

== See also ==
- OGLE-TR-122
- EBLM J0555-57
