= OGLE-TR-122 =

Binary star in the constellation Carina

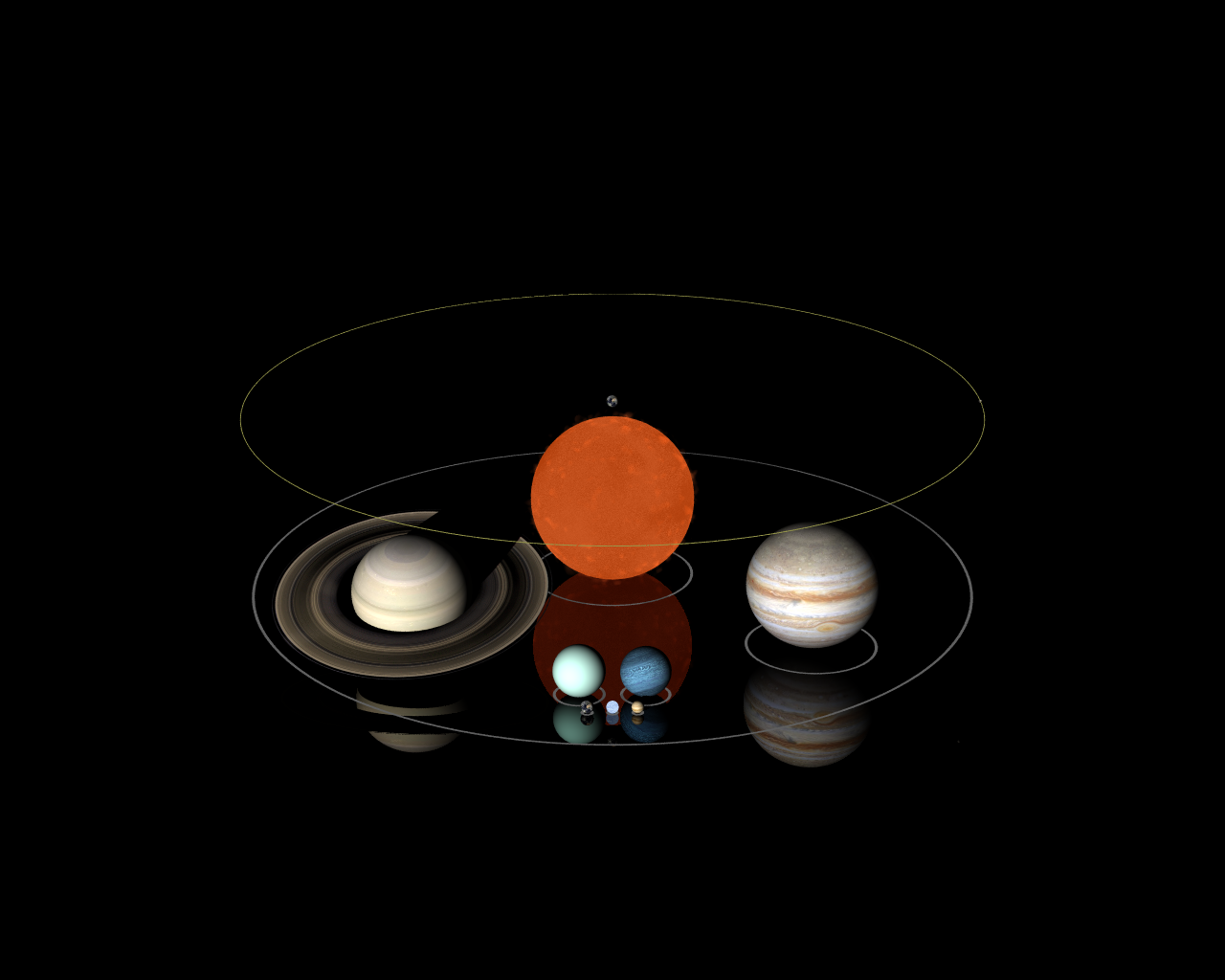
- The Earth-Moon orbit, Saturn, OGLE-TR-122b, Jupiter, and other objects, to scale.

Observation data Epoch J2000.0 Equinox ICRS
- Constellation: Carina
- Right ascension: 11^{h} 06^{m} 51.99^{s}
- Declination: −60° 51′ 45.7″
- Apparent magnitude (V): 16.8

Characteristics
- Spectral type: ? (primary)/M (b)
- Apparent magnitude (I): 15.61 (system)
- Variable type: Algol

Orbit
Period (P)	7.26867 d
Eccentricity (e)	0.205±0.008
Inclination (i)	88–90°
Periastron epoch (T)	JD 2452342.41±0.02
Argument of periastron (ω) (secondary)	99.2±0.8°
Semi-amplitude (K_{1}) (primary)	9.642±0.088 km/s

Details

OGLE-TR-122A
Mass	0.98±0.14 M_{☉}
Radius	1.05+0.20 −0.09 R_{☉}
Surface gravity (log g)	3.9±0.5 cgs
Temperature	5,700±300 K
Metallicity [Fe/H]	0.15±0.36 dex
Rotational velocity (v sin i)	5.7±0.6 km/s

OGLE-TR-122B
Mass	0.092±0.009 M_{☉}
Radius	0.120+0.024 −0.013 R_{☉}

Other designations
- V817 Car

Database references
SIMBAD	data

OGLE-TR-122 is a binary stellar system containing one of the smallest main-sequence stars whose radius has been measured. It was discovered when the Optical Gravitational Lensing Experiment (OGLE) survey observed the smaller star eclipsing the larger primary. The orbital period is approximately 7.3 days. The system's primary is thought to resemble the Sun.

== OGLE-TR-122B ==
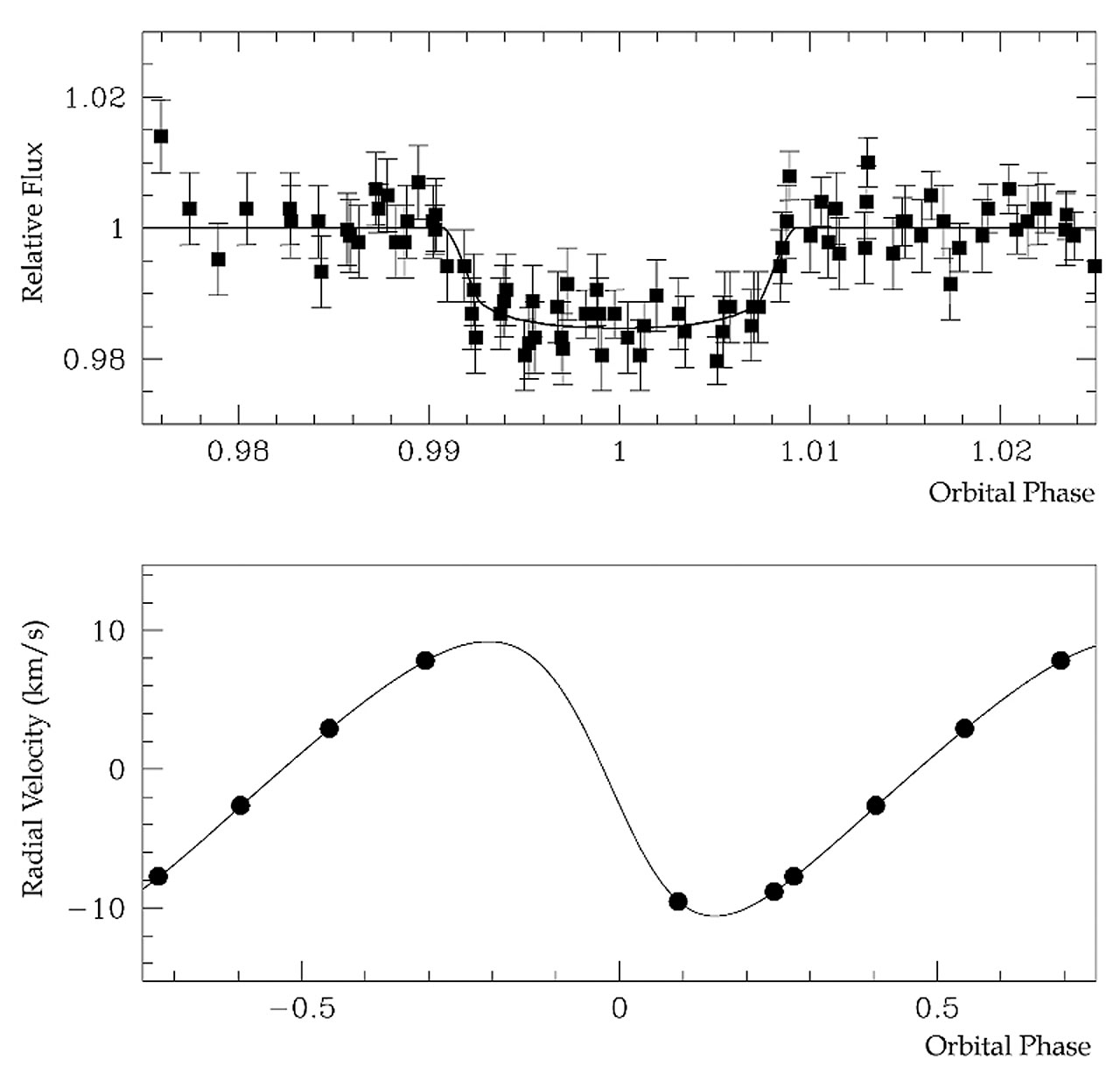
Brightness dip and velocity variations of OGLE-TR-122

The smaller star, OGLE-TR-122B, is estimated to have a radius around 0.12 solar radii, or around 20% larger than Jupiter's, and a mass of around 0.1 solar masses, or approximately 100 times Jupiter's. This makes its average density approximately 50 times the Sun's or over 80 times the density of water. OGLE-TR-122b's mass is close to the lowest possible mass for a hydrogen-fusing star, estimated to be around 0.07 or 0.08 solar masses. The observed transit provides the first direct evidence for a star with a radius comparable to Jupiter's.

== See also ==
- OGLE-TR-123
- EBLM J0555-57
