= HD 83332 =

Star in the constellation Antlia

Observation data Epoch J2000.0 Equinox ICRS
- Constellation: Antlia
- Right ascension: 09^{h} 37^{m} 00.2073^{s}
- Declination: −25° 17′ 48.335″
- Apparent magnitude (V): 5.68±0.01

Characteristics
- Spectral type: K0 III
- B−V color index: +1.12

Astrometry
Radial velocity (R_{v})	30±2 km/s
Proper motion (μ)	RA: −63.114 mas/yr Dec.: +36.255 mas/yr
Parallax (π)	11.4429±0.0711 mas
Distance	285 ± 2 ly (87.4 ± 0.5 pc)
Absolute magnitude (M_{V})	+0.78

Details
Mass	1.6^{+0.6}_{−0.9} M_{☉}
Radius	10.6 R_{☉}
Luminosity	55 L_{☉}
Surface gravity (log g)	2.40 ± 0.37 cgs
Temperature	4,610±110 K
Metallicity [Fe/H]	+0.05 dex
Age	2.67^{+0.28}_{−0.56} Gyr

Other designations
- 16 G. Antliae, CD−24°8272, CPD−24°4144, GC 13287, HD 83332, HIP 47187, HR 3830, SAO 177748

Database references
SIMBAD	data

HD 83332 (HR 3830) is a solitary, orange hued star located in the southern constellation Antlia. It has an apparent magnitude of 5.68, making it faintly visible to the naked eye if viewed under ideal conditions. The star is located 285 light years away based on its annual parallax shift, but is drifting away with a radial velocity of 30 km/s.

HD 83332 has a classification of K0 III, which suggests it is an evolved giant star. At present it has 1.6 times the mass of the Sun and at an age of 2.7 billion years, has expanded to a radius of 10.6 R_{☉}. It radiates at 55 times the luminosity of the Sun from its enlarged photosphere at an effective temperature of 4,610 K. HD 83332 has a solar metallicity, 112% that of the Sun to be exact, and is a member of the thin disk.
