= HD 90132 =

Solitary White-hued star and high proper motion star

- Location of HD 90132 in red

Observation data Epoch J2000.0 Equinox ICRS
- Constellation: Antlia
- Right ascension: 10^{h} 23^{m} 29.29608^{s}
- Declination: −38° 00′ 35.4255″
- Apparent magnitude (V): 5.33±0.01

Characteristics
- Spectral type: A8 V
- B−V color index: +0.25

Astrometry
Radial velocity (R_{v})	17±4.2 km/s
Proper motion (μ)	RA: −158.833 mas/yr Dec.: −53.705 mas/yr
Parallax (π)	24.2034±0.0725 mas
Distance	134.8 ± 0.4 ly (41.3 ± 0.1 pc)
Absolute magnitude (M_{V})	+2.25

Details
Mass	1.69±0.27 M_{☉}
Radius	1.87±0.87 R_{☉}
Luminosity	9.79±0.06 L_{☉}
Surface gravity (log g)	4.15 cgs
Temperature	7,737±263 K
Metallicity [Fe/H]	−0.13 dex
Rotational velocity (v sin i)	270 km/s
Age	70 Myr

Other designations
- 64 G. Antliae, CD−37°6509, CPD−37°4123, FK5 1269, GC 14281, HD 90132, HIP 50888, HR 4086, SAO 201346

Database references
SIMBAD	data

HD 90132 (HR 4086) is a solitary white hued star located in the southern constellation Antlia. It has an apparent magnitude of 5.33, making it one of the brighter members of this generally faint constellation. The star is relatively close at a distance of 135 light years but is receding with a heliocentric radial velocity of 17 km/s.

HD 90132 has a stellar classification of A8 V, indicating that it is an ordinary A-type main-sequence star. At present it has 1.69 times the mass of the Sun and 1.87 times the radius of the Sun. Despite a young age of 70 million years, the star has a lower surface gravity than expected. This is due to the equator being 18% larger than the poles, which is due to a high projected rotational velocity of 270 km/s. Nevertheless, it shines with a luminosity of 9.8 L_{☉} from its photosphere at an effective temperature of 7,737 K. HD 90132 is slightly metal deficient with a metallicity 74% that of Sun.

This star was observed for infrared excess suggesting the presence of a circumstellar disk, but as of 2017 no excess have been found.
