= HD 85725 =

Star in the constellation Antlia

Observation data Epoch J2000 Equinox J2000
- Constellation: Antlia
- Right ascension: 09^{h} 52^{m} 58.02763^{s}
- Declination: −27° 19′ 55.8219″
- Apparent magnitude (V): 6.28

Characteristics
- Evolutionary stage: subgiant
- Spectral type: G1 V
- B−V color index: +0.62

Astrometry
Radial velocity (R_{v})	61.6±0.1 km/s
Proper motion (μ)	RA: −278.245 mas/yr Dec.: +95.043 mas/yr
Parallax (π)	18.5634±0.0256 mas
Distance	175.7 ± 0.2 ly (53.87 ± 0.07 pc)
Absolute magnitude (M_{V})	+2.68

Details
Mass	1.42 M_{☉}
Radius	2.59±0.11 R_{☉}
Luminosity	7.58 L_{☉}
Surface gravity (log g)	3.86 cgs
Temperature	5,940±110 K
Metallicity [Fe/H]	+0.15 dex
Rotational velocity (v sin i)	5.9±0.3 km/s
Age	2.75 Gyr

Other designations
- 33 G. Antliae, CD−26°7505, CPD−26°4079, HIP 48468, HR 3916, SAO 178130, WDS J09530-2720A

Database references
SIMBAD	data

HD 85725, also known as HR 3916, is a yellow hued star located in the southern constellation Antlia. It has an apparent magnitude of 6.29, placing it near the limit for naked eye visibility. The object is relatively close at a distance of 176 light-years, but is receding with a heliocentric radial velocity of 61.6 km/s.

HD 85725 has a stellar classification of G1 V, which suggests that it is an ordinary G-type main-sequence star that is fusing hydrogen at its core. However, a low surface gravity of 7,244 cm/s^{2} and evolutionary models indicate that is an evolved subgiant.

At present it has 143% the mass of the Sun but is 2.59 times larger, which is not characteristic of a yellow dwarf. It shines at 7.6 times the luminosity of the Sun from its photosphere at a surface temperature of 5,940 K, which gives it a yellow glow. At an age of 2.75 billion years, HD 85725 is spinning leisurely with a projected rotational velocity of 5.9 km/s.

There is a 10th magnitude companion located 1.5″ away along a position angle of 25°. It appears to have a common proper motion with the star, suggesting physical relation.
