= EBLM J0555−57 =

Triple star system in the constellation Pictor

EBLM J0555−57AB
- Resolved image of EBLM J0555−57A (left) and EBLM J0555−57B (right) taken with the Leonhard Euler Telescope at the ESO's La Silla Observatory; Credit: ESO

Observation data Epoch J2000 Equinox ICRS
- Constellation: Pictor
- EBLM J0555−57A
- Right ascension: 05^{h} 55^{m} 32.6885^{s}
- Declination: −57° 17′ 26.067″
- Apparent magnitude (V): 9.98
- EBLM J0555−57B
- Right ascension: 05^{h} 55^{m} 32.3944^{s}
- Declination: −57° 17′ 26.748″
- Apparent magnitude (V): 10.76

Characteristics

EBLM J0555−57A
- Evolutionary stage: Main sequence
- Spectral type: F8
- Variable type: Eclipsing

EBLM J0555−57B
- Evolutionary stage: Main sequence

Astrometry

EBLM J0555−57A
Radial velocity (R_{v})	18.66±0.74 km/s
Proper motion (μ)	RA: 2.972 mas/yr Dec.: −39.532 mas/yr
Parallax (π)	4.8611±0.0137 mas
Distance	671 ± 2 ly (205.7 ± 0.6 pc)

EBLM J0555−57B
Proper motion (μ)	RA: 2.838 mas/yr Dec.: −38.344 mas/yr
Parallax (π)	4.8747±0.0175 mas
Distance	669 ± 2 ly (205.1 ± 0.7 pc)

Position (relative to A)
Component	B
Epoch of observation	1998
Angular distance	2.50″
Position angle	254°
Projected separation	479 AU

Orbit
Primary	Aa
Secondary	Ab
Period (P)	7.757676+0.000029 −0.000025 d
Semi-major axis (a)	0.0895+0.0018 −0.0019 au
Eccentricity (e)	0.0894+0.0035 −0.0036
Inclination (i)	89.3+0.9 −1.1°
Argument of periastron (ω) (secondary)	−53.7+1.5 −1.8°

Details

EBLM J0555−57Aa
Mass	1.180+0.082 −0.079 M_{☉}
Radius	1.00+0.14 −0.07 R_{☉}
Luminosity	3.245 L_{☉}
Surface gravity (log g)	4.10±0.21 cgs
Temperature	6,368±124 K
Metallicity [Fe/H]	−0.04±0.14 dex
Rotation	6.92±1.61 days
Rotational velocity (v sin i)	7.60±0.28 km/s
Age	1.6±1.2 Gyr

EBLM J0555−57Ab
Mass	0.0839±0.0038 M_{☉}
Mass	87.9±4.0 M_{Jup}
Radius	0.0844+0.0131 −0.0060 R_{☉}
Radius	0.82+0.13 −0.06 R_{Jup}
Surface gravity (log g)	5.51+0.06 −0.12 cgs

EBLM J0555−57B
Mass	1.01 M_{☉}
Radius	0.94±0.08 R_{☉}
Luminosity	1.501 L_{☉}
Surface gravity (log g)	4.37 cgs
Temperature	5,717±124 K
Metallicity [Fe/H]	−0.38 dex

Other designations
- CD−57 1311, CPD−57 913, WDS J05555−5717, TYC 8528–926, 2MASS J05553262−5717261

Database references
SIMBAD	data
- A
- B

EBLM J0555−57 is a triple star system approximately 670 light-years (205 parsecs) from Earth. The system's discovery was released on July 12, 2017. EBLM J0555−57Ab, the smallest star in the system, orbits its primary star with a period of 7.8 days, and currently is the smallest known star with a mass sufficient to enable the fusion of hydrogen in its core.

== System ==
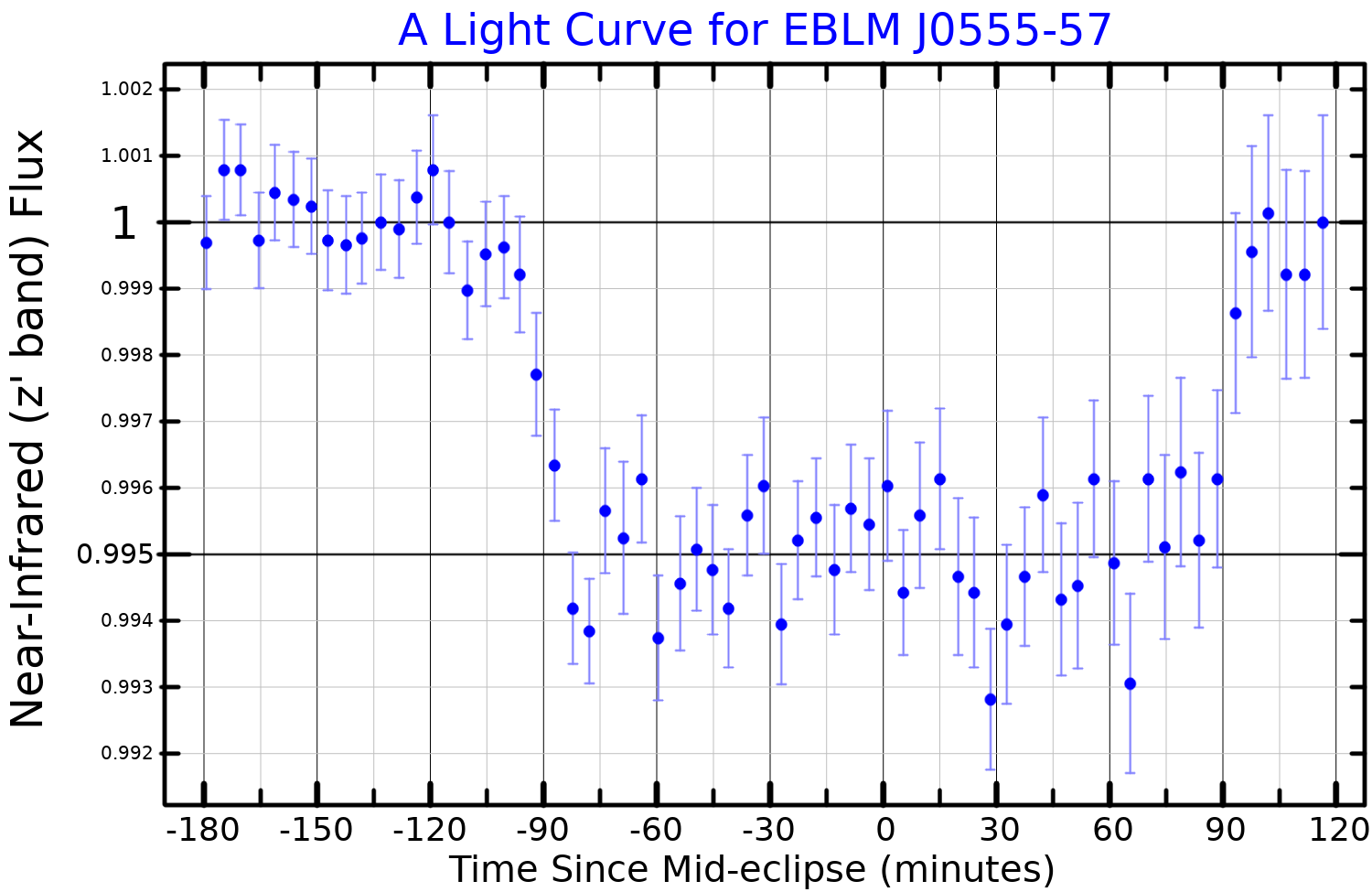
A z' band light curve for EBLM J0555−57, adapted from von Boetticher et al. (2017)

EBLM J0555−57, also known as CD−57 1311, is a triple star system in the constellation Pictor, which contains a visual binary system consisting of two sun-like stars separated by 2.5": EBLM J0555−57Aa, a magnitude 9.98 spectral type F8 star, and EBLM J0555−57B, a magnitude 10.76 star. No orbital motion has been detected but they have almost identical radial velocities and are assumed to be gravitationally bound.

Component A of the system is itself an eclipsing binary (EBLM J0555−57Ab orbiting EBLM J0555−57Aa). Eclipses, also known as transits in the context of planetary searches, have been detected in the near infrared, with brightness drops of 0.05% during the eclipse. The shape and duration of the transits allow the radii of the two stars to be determined. A full solution of the orbit gives a period of 7 days and 18 hours, with a low eccentricity of 0.09, an almost edge-on inclination of 89.84°, and a semi-major axis of 0.08 AU.

== EBLM J0555−57Ab ==
EBLM J0555−57Ab has a mass of about 88±4 Jupiter masses, or 0.084 solar masses. Its radius is 0.084 solar radii (about 59,000 km), comparable to Saturn, which has an equatorial radius of 60,268 km. The star is about 290 times more massive than Saturn. Current stellar models put its mass at the lower limit for hydrogen-burning stars. EBLM J0555−57Ab was discovered by a group of scientists at the University of Cambridge associated with the EBLM project (Eclipsing Binary, Low Mass), using data collected by the WASP project. WASP (Wide Angle Search for Planets) is searching for exoplanets using the transit method. The findings were released on July 12, 2017, though the exact date of the discovery is unknown. Additional properties of the star were determined using Doppler spectroscopy, to measure the periodic radial velocity variation of the primary star due to the gravitational influence of its companion. EBLM J0555−57Ab is the smallest hydrogen burning star currently known.

== See also ==
- 2MASS J0523−1403
- OGLE-TR-122 - This binary stellar system contained one of the smallest red dwarfs known when it was discovered.
- OGLE-TR-123
- TRAPPIST-1
- SSSPM J0829–1309
- GJ 1245
- List of smallest stars
