= List of stars in Columba =

This is the list of notable stars in the constellation Columba, sorted by decreasing brightness.

| Name | B | G. | Var | HD | HIP | RA | Dec | vis. mag. | abs. mag. | Dist. (ly) | Sp. class | Notes |
|---|---|---|---|---|---|---|---|---|---|---|---|---|
| α Col | α (Note: Designated Upsilon Canis Majoris by Johann Bayer in his Uranographia) | 38 | | 37795 | 26634 | 05^{h} 39^{m} 38.94^{s} | −34° 04′ 26.6″ | 2.65 | −1.93 | 268 | B7IV | Phact; suspected γ Cas variable, V_{max} = 2.62^{m}, V_{min} = 2.66^{m} |
| β Col | β | 53 | | 39425 | 27628 | 05^{h} 50^{m} 57.55^{s} | −35° 46′ 09.5″ | 3.12 | 1.02 | 86 | K1.5III | Wazn |
| δ Col | δ | 91 | | 44762 | 30277 | 06^{h} 22^{m} 06.85^{s} | −33° 26′ 10.6″ | 3.85 | −0.46 | 237 | G7II | |
| ε Col | ε | 22 | | 36597 | 25859 | 05^{h} 31^{m} 12.74^{s} | −35° 28′ 13.6″ | 3.86 | −0.79 | 277 | K1II/III | |
| η Col | η | 66 | | 40808 | 28328 | 05^{h} 59^{m} 08.79^{s} | −42° 48′ 54.4″ | 3.96 | −2.10 | 531 | K0III | |
| γ Col | γ | 65 | | 40494 | 28199 | 05^{h} 57^{m} 32.21^{s} | −35° 16′ 59.9″ | 4.36 | −2.73 | 853 | B2.5IV | suspected variable |
| κ Col | κ | 84 | | 43785 | 29807 | 06^{h} 16^{m} 33.14^{s} | −35° 08′ 26.6″ | 4.37 | 0.63 | 183 | G8II | suspected variable |
| ο Col | ο | 11 | | 34642 | 24659 | 05^{h} 17^{m} 29.02^{s} | −34° 53′ 39.8″ | 4.81 | 2.17 | 110 | K0/K1III/IV | |
| λ Col | λ | 57 | | 39764 | 27810 | 05^{h} 53^{m} 06.88^{s} | −33° 48′ 05.2″ | 4.88 | −0.22 | 341 | B5V | Tsze; rotating ellipsoidal variable, V_{max} = 4.85^{m}, V_{min} = 4.92^{m}, P = 0.64 d |
| ξ Col | ξ | 61 | | 40176 | 28010 | 05^{h} 55^{m} 29.89^{s} | −37° 07′ 14.2″ | 4.97 | −0.05 | 328 | K1IIICN... | |
| θ Col | θ | 79 | | 42167 | 29034 | 06^{h} 07^{m} 31.63^{s} | −37° 15′ 10.5″ | 5.00 | −1.84 | 762 | B8:IV | Elkurud |
| μ Col | μ | 45 | | 38666 | 27204 | 05^{h} 45^{m} 59.89^{s} | −32° 18′ 23.0″ | 5.18 | −2.81 | 1294 | O9.5V | She; runaway star |
| HD 46568 | | 104 | | 46568 | 31165 | 06^{h} 32^{m} 21.33^{s} | −37° 41′ 47.4″ | 5.25 | 0.64 | 273 | G8III | |
| ν^{2} Col | ν^{2} | 34 | | 37495 | 26460 | 05^{h} 37^{m} 44.64^{s} | −28° 41′ 23.3″ | 5.28 | 2.14 | 138 | F5V | |
| WZ Col | | 42 | WZ | 38170 | 26868 | 05^{h} 42^{m} 15.19^{s} | −34° 40′ 04.6″ | 5.29 | 0.06 | 363 | B9/B9.5V | 53 Persei variable |
| HD 46815 | | 106 | | 46815 | 31299 | 06^{h} 33^{m} 49.49^{s} | −36° 13′ 56.2″ | 5.42 | −0.06 | 406 | K3III | |
| HD 37811 | | 39 | | 37811 | 26649 | 05^{h} 39^{m} 49.85^{s} | −32° 37′ 44.9″ | 5.44 | 0.10 | 382 | G6/G8III | |
| HD 36848 | | 24 | | 36848 | 25993 | 05^{h} 32^{m} 51.38^{s} | −38° 30′ 48.0″ | 5.45 | 1.83 | 172 | K2/K3III | |
| π^{2} Col | π^{2} | 80 | | 42303 | 29064 | 06^{h} 07^{m} 52.87^{s} | −42° 09′ 14.4″ | 5.50 | 0.98 | 261 | A0V | |
| σ Col | σ | 63 | | 40248 | 28098 | 05^{h} 56^{m} 20.94^{s} | −31° 22′ 56.8″ | 5.52 | −2.74 | 1462 | F2III | |
| HD 41047 | φ (Note: Labelled Phi Columbae (φ Col/φ Columbae) by Bode in his Uranographia) | 67 | | 41047 | 28524 | 06^{h} 01^{m} 16.29^{s} | −33° 54′ 42.4″ | 5.54 | −0.62 | 555 | K5III | |
| AF Col | | 82 | AF | 42682 | 29263 | 06^{h} 10^{m} 10.42^{s} | −40° 21′ 14.3″ | 5.54 | −1.55 | 853 | M2II/III | semiregular variable |
| HD 43899 | χ^{2} (Note: Labelled Chi^{2} Columbae (χ^{2} Col/χ^{2} Columbae) by Bode in his Uranographia) | 86 | | 43899 | 29842 | 06^{h} 17^{m} 01.23^{s} | −37° 44′ 15.5″ | 5.54 | 0.70 | 302 | K2III | |
| HD 40091 | (υ) (Note: Labelled Upsilon Pictoris (υ Pic/υ Pictoris) by Bode in his Uranographia) | 60 | | 40091 | 27955 | 05^{h} 54^{m} 52.49^{s} | −39° 57′ 28.5″ | 5.55 | −0.42 | 509 | M0III | suspected variable |
| HD 44506 | | 90 | | 44506 | 30143 | 06^{h} 20^{m} 36.24^{s} | −34° 08′ 39.1″ | 5.55 | −3.40 | 2012 | B3V | suspected variable, V_{max} = 5.48^{m}, V_{min} = 5.55^{m} |
| HD 36187 | | 20 | | 36187 | 25608 | 05^{h} 28^{m} 15.33^{s} | −37° 13′ 51.4″ | 5.56 | 0.79 | 294 | A0V | |
| HD 47144 | | 108 | | 47144 | 31457 | 06^{h} 35^{m} 24.22^{s} | −36° 46′ 47.7″ | 5.59 | −0.66 | 580 | A0V | variable star |
| HD 39720 | | 55 | | 39720 | 27766 | 05^{h} 52^{m} 33.16^{s} | −37° 37′ 51.6″ | 5.62 | 0.65 | 321 | K1III | |
| HD 45145 | | 93 | | 45145 | 30444 | 06^{h} 24^{m} 01.02^{s} | −36° 42′ 28.4″ | 5.62 | 0.74 | 308 | K1II/III | |
| HD 41534 | | 72 | | 41534 | 28756 | 06^{h} 04^{m} 20.28^{s} | −32° 10′ 21.8″ | 5.65 | −1.96 | 1083 | B2V | variable star, ΔV = 0.009^{m}, P = 8.83704 d; runaway star |
| SW Col | | 15 | SW | 35515 | 25194 | 05^{h} 23^{m} 24.00^{s} | −39° 40′ 42.4″ | 5.71 | −0.45 | 561 | M2III | slow irregular variable, ΔV = 0.34^{m}, P = 151.4 d |
| HD 47500 | | 112 | | 47500 | 31637 | 06^{h} 37^{m} 13.84^{s} | −36° 59′ 26.5″ | 5.72 | −2.81 | 1655 | B5/7IV | Binary star |
| HD 34266 | | 6 | | 34266 | 24426 | 05^{h} 14^{m} 28.84^{s} | −35° 58′ 37.3″ | 5.75 | −0.11 | 484 | G8III | |
| HD 36874 | | 25 | | 36874 | 26019 | 05^{h} 33^{m} 07.32^{s} | −35° 08′ 21.5″ | 5.75 | 1.10 | 278 | K0III | |
| HD 37192 | | 28 | | 37192 | 26219 | 05^{h} 35^{m} 15.45^{s} | −33° 04′ 48.0″ | 5.76 | 0.82 | 317 | K0III | |
| HD 44323 | | 88 | | 44323 | 30069 | 06^{h} 19^{m} 40.95^{s} | −34° 23′ 47.7″ | 5.76 | 0.34 | 396 | B9V | |
| HD 41843 | | 74 | | 41843 | 28899 | 06^{h} 06^{m} 05.53^{s} | −29° 45′ 30.7″ | 5.79 | 1.23 | 266 | A1V | |
| HD 41759 | | 73 | | 41759 | 28855 | 06^{h} 05^{m} 27.17^{s} | −35° 30′ 49.3″ | 5.80 | 1.27 | 263 | A0V | |
| HD 37717 | | 37 | | 37717 | 26545 | 05^{h} 38^{m} 43.53^{s} | −40° 42′ 26.5″ | 5.81 | −0.08 | 490 | B8V | |
| HD 42054 | | 76 | | 42054 | 28992 | 06^{h} 07^{m} 03.67^{s} | −34° 18′ 43.3″ | 5.82 | −1.72 | 1052 | B4Vnn | suspected variable, V_{max} = 5.79^{m}, V_{min} = 5.86^{m} |
| HD 46349 | | 101 | | 46349 | 31072 | 06^{h} 31^{m} 13.10^{s} | −35° 15′ 31.9″ | 5.82 | −1.16 | 811 | G8III+... | |
| HD 36060 | | 18 | | 36060 | 25488 | 05^{h} 27^{m} 05.32^{s} | −40° 56′ 37.6″ | 5.86 | 0.97 | 310 | A7m | |
| HD 43940 | χ^{1} (Note: Labelled Chi^{1} Columbae (χ^{1} Col/χ^{1} Columbae) by Bode in his Uranographia) | 87 | | 43940 | 29852 | 06^{h} 17^{m} 09.57^{s} | −37° 15′ 12.4″ | 5.88 | 1.91 | 202 | A2V | suspected variable |
| HD 34868 | ψ (Note: Labelled Psi Columbae (ψ Col/ψ Columbae) by Bode in his Uranographia) | 12 | | 34868 | 24831 | 05^{h} 19^{m} 23.69^{s} | −27° 22′ 07.9″ | 5.98 | 0.30 | 446 | A0V | |
| HD 43847 | | 85 | | 43847 | 29808 | 06^{h} 16^{m} 35.60^{s} | −39° 15′ 51.7″ | 6.00 | 0.61 | 390 | A2Vm... | |
| HD 47463 | | 110 | | 47463 | 31617 | 06^{h} 37^{m} 01.89^{s} | −38° 08′ 47.8″ | 6.03 | 0.41 | 434 | K0III | |
| AN Col | | 14 | AN | 35165 | 25007 | 05^{h} 21^{m} 16.86^{s} | −34° 20′ 42.2″ | 6.05 | −2.77 | 1895 | B5II/III | Be star, ΔV = 6.03^{m}, P = 6.11 d |
| ν^{1} Col | ν^{1} | 32 | | 37430 | 26412 | 05^{h} 37^{m} 16.49^{s} | −27° 52′ 16.3″ | 6.15 | 2.91 | 145 | F0IV | |
| π^{1} Col | π^{1} | 78 | | 42078 | 28957 | 06^{h} 06^{m} 41.07^{s} | −42° 17′ 55.7″ | 6.15 | 1.18 | 322 | Am | |
| HD 38138 | ι (Note: Labelled Iota Columbae (ι Col/ι Columbae) by Bode in his Uranographia) | 41 | | 38138 | 26862 | 05^{h} 42^{m} 11.58^{s} | −30° 32′ 07.7″ | 6.18 | −0.02 | 566 | A0V | |
| HD 46365 | | 102 | | 46365 | 31056 | 06^{h} 30^{m} 59.90^{s} | −40° 54′ 58.6″ | 6.19 | −0.07 | 581 | K3III | |
| HD 38804 | | 46 | | 38804 | 27303 | 05^{h} 47^{m} 04.58^{s} | −28° 38′ 20.2″ | 6.22 | −0.12 | 604 | B5III | |
| HD 45383 | | 97 | | 45383 | 30566 | 06^{h} 25^{m} 30.01^{s} | −35° 03′ 50.5″ | 6.24 | 0.28 | 506 | K3III | |
| HD 38385 | | 43 | | 38385 | 26981 | 05^{h} 43^{m} 30.15^{s} | −39° 24′ 24.9″ | 6.25 | 2.61 | 174 | F3V | |
| HD 37286 | | 30 | | 37286 | 26309 | 05^{h} 36^{m} 10.28^{s} | −28° 42′ 28.8″ | 6.26 | 2.50 | 184 | A2III/IV | |
| SX Col | | 103 | SX | 46431 | 31099 | 06^{h} 31^{m} 34.95^{s} | −36° 56′ 24.7″ | 6.28 | −1.02 | 931 | M2/M3III | slow irregular variable, ΔV = 0.13^{m}, P = 22.25 d |
| HD 38885 | | 48 | | 38885 | 27325 | 05^{h} 47^{m} 18.69^{s} | −35° 40′ 27.2″ | 6.29 | 0.31 | 511 | K1III | |
| HD 45306 | | 96 | | 45306 | 30505 | 06^{h} 24^{m} 44.50^{s} | −40° 17′ 02.3″ | 6.30 | 0.28 | 522 | B9V | |
| HD 45983 | | 99 | | 45983 | 30849 | 06^{h} 28^{m} 42.40^{s} | −41° 04′ 29.7″ | 6.32 | 1.78 | 264 | F2/F3V | |
| HD 35046 | | 13 | | 35046 | 24909 | 05^{h} 20^{m} 20.71^{s} | −34° 41′ 55.9″ | 6.34 | −0.31 | 698 | F0/F2IV | |
| HD 39891 | τ (Note: Labelled Tau Columbae (τ Col/τ Columbae) by Bode in his Uranographia) | 58 | | 39891 | 27901 | 05^{h} 54^{m} 14.04^{s} | −29° 08′ 49.6″ | 6.34 | 2.60 | 183 | F3V | |
| HD 38056 | | 40 | | 38056 | 26796 | 05^{h} 41^{m} 26.92^{s} | −33° 24′ 02.6″ | 6.35 | 0.74 | 432 | B9.5V | |
| HD 47230 | | 109 | | 47230 | 31509 | 06^{h} 35^{m} 54.07^{s} | −36° 05′ 18.4″ | 6.36 | 3.33 | 131 | F6V | |
| HD 47475 | | 111 | | 47475 | 31603 | 06^{h} 36^{m} 51.27^{s} | −41° 33′ 25.8″ | 6.36 | −2.21 | 1689 | K0II | |
| HD 40359 | | 64 | | 40359 | 28138 | 05^{h} 56^{m} 49.00^{s} | −31° 58′ 34.6″ | 6.44 | −0.44 | 776 | G8III | |
| HD 46727 | | 105 | | 46727 | 31241 | 06^{h} 33^{m} 10.24^{s} | −38° 37′ 30.5″ | 6.44 | 0.64 | 470 | G8III | |
| HD 39543 | | 54 | | 39543 | 27705 | 05^{h} 51^{m} 59.59^{s} | −29° 26′ 57.8″ | 6.47 | −0.17 | 694 | K3III | |
| HD 45680 | | 98 | | 45680 | 30706 | 06^{h} 27^{m} 07.59^{s} | −37° 53′ 44.2″ | 6.48 | 2.99 | 162 | F3V | |
| HD 39901 | | 59 | | 39901 | 27835 | 05^{h} 53^{m} 22.85108^{s} | −42° 53′ 16.7819″ | 6.56 | 0.04 | 680 | K3III | |
| HD 33473 | (μ) (Note: Labelled Mu Caeli (μ Cae/μ Caeli) by Bode in his Uranographia) | 2 | | 33473 | 23926 | 05^{h} 08^{m} 29.96^{s} | ―41° 12′ 51.7″ | 6.75 | | 175 | G3V | |
| HD 43848 | | | | 43848 | 29804 | 06^{h} 16^{m} 31.36^{s} | −40° 31′ 54.7″ | 8.64 | | 123.4 | K2IV | has a planet |
| WASP-63 | | | | | | 06^{h} 17^{m} 21.0^{s} | −38° 19′ 24″ | 11.2 | | 1076 | G8 | has a transiting planet (b) |
| L 449-1 | | | | | | 05^{h} 17^{m} 22.93^{s} | −35° 21′ 54.5″ | 11.7 | | 19 | M4 | |
| TV Col | | | TV | | | 05^{h} 29^{m} 25.53^{s} | −32° 49′ 03.9″ | 12.2 | | | K1 | DQ Her variable and eclipsing binary, V_{max} = 12.2^{m}, V_{min} = 14.5^{m}, P = 0.5365803 d |
| AP Col | | | AP | | | 06^{h} 04^{m} 52.16^{s} | −34° 33′ 36.1″ | 12.96 | 13.34 | 27.4 | M5 | flare star; closest known pre-main-sequence star |
| WASP-160 B | | | | | | 05^{h} 50^{m} 43.1^{s} | −27° 37′ 23″ | 13.09 | | | K0V | has a transiting planet (b) |
| TX Col | | | TX | | | 05^{h} 43^{m} 20.17^{s} | −41° 08′ 54.3″ | 14.1 | | | | DQ Her variable, V_{max} = 14.1^{m}, V_{min} = 15.4^{m}, P = 0.5365803 d |
| 4U 0513-40 | | | | | | 05^{h} 14^{m} 06.59^{s} | −40° 02′ 37.0″ | | | 35900 | | in NGC 1851; low-mass X-ray binary |
Table legend: • Name = Proper name • B = Bayer designation • F or/and G. = Flamsteed designation or Gould designation • Var = Variable-star designation • HD = Henry Draper Catalogue designation number • HIP = Hipparcos Catalogue designation number • RA = Right ascension for the Epoch/Equinox J2000.0 • Dec = Declination for the Epoch/Equinox J2000.0 • vis. mag. = visual magnitude (m or m_{v}), also known as apparent magnitude • abs. mag. = absolute magnitude (M_{v}) • Dist. (ly) = Distance in light-years from Earth • Sp. class = Spectral class of the star in the stellar classification system • Notes = Common name(s) or alternate name(s); comments; notable properties [for example: multiple star status, range of variability if it is a variable star, exoplanets, etc.]

== See also ==
- List of stars by constellation
