= Columba in Chinese astronomy =

The modern constellation Columba lies across two of the quadrants, symbolized by the White Tiger of the West (西方白虎, Xī Fāng Bái Hǔ) and the Vermillion Bird of the South (南方朱雀, Nán Fāng Zhū Què), that divide the sky in traditional Chinese uranography.

The name of the western constellation in modern Chinese is 天鴿座 (tiān gē zuò), meaning "the heaven dove constellation".

== Stars ==
The map of Chinese constellation in constellation Columba area consists of :

Four Symbols	Mansion (Chinese name)	Romanization	Translation	Asterisms (Chinese name)	Romanization	Translation	Western star name	Proper Name	Chinese star name	Romanization	Translation
White Tiger of the West (西方白虎)	參	Shēn	Three Stars	屎	Shǐ	Excrement	μ Col		屎	Shǐ	(One star of)
Vermilion Bird of the South (南方朱雀)	井	Jǐng	Well	丈人	Zhàngrén	Grandfather					
Vermilion Bird of the South (南方朱雀)	井	Jǐng	Well	丈人	Zhàngrén	Grandfather	α Col	Phact			
Vermilion Bird of the South (南方朱雀)	井	Jǐng	Well	丈人	Zhàngrén	Grandfather	α Col	Phact	丈人一	Zhàngrényī	1st star
Vermilion Bird of the South (南方朱雀)	井	Jǐng	Well	丈人	Zhàngrén	Grandfather	α Col	Phact	丈人北星	Zhàngrénběixīng	Northern star
Vermilion Bird of the South (南方朱雀)	井	Jǐng	Well	丈人	Zhàngrén	Grandfather	ε Col		丈人二	Zhàngrénèr	2nd star
Vermilion Bird of the South (南方朱雀)	井	Jǐng	Well	子	Zǐ	Son					
Vermilion Bird of the South (南方朱雀)	井	Jǐng	Well	子	Zǐ	Son	λ Col		子一	Zǐyī	1st star
Vermilion Bird of the South (南方朱雀)	井	Jǐng	Well	子	Zǐ	Son	β Col	Wazn	子二	Zǐèr	2nd star
Vermilion Bird of the South (南方朱雀)	井	Jǐng	Well	子	Zǐ	Son	γ Col		子增一	Zǐzēngyī	1st additional star
Vermilion Bird of the South (南方朱雀)	井	Jǐng	Well	孫	Sūn	Grandson					
Vermilion Bird of the South (南方朱雀)	井	Jǐng	Well	孫	Sūn	Grandson	κ Col		孫一	Sūnyī	1st star
Vermilion Bird of the South (南方朱雀)	井	Jǐng	Well	孫	Sūn	Grandson	θ Col	Elkurud	孫二	Sūnèr	2nd star
Vermilion Bird of the South (南方朱雀)	井	Jǐng	Well	孫	Sūn	Grandson	δ Col		孫增三	Sūnzēngsān	3rd additional star

== See also ==
- Traditional Chinese star names
- Chinese constellations
