= Nu Columbae =

The Bayer designation Nu Columbae (ν Col / ν Columbae) is shared by two stars, in the constellation Columba:

- ν¹ Columbae
- ν² Columbae
