= Pi Columbae =

The Bayer designation Pi Columbae (π Col / π Columbae) may refer to either the star or star system in the constellation Columba:

- Pi^{1} Columbae (star)
- Pi^{2} Columbae (star system)
