= NGC 2090 =

Spiral galaxy in the constellation Columba

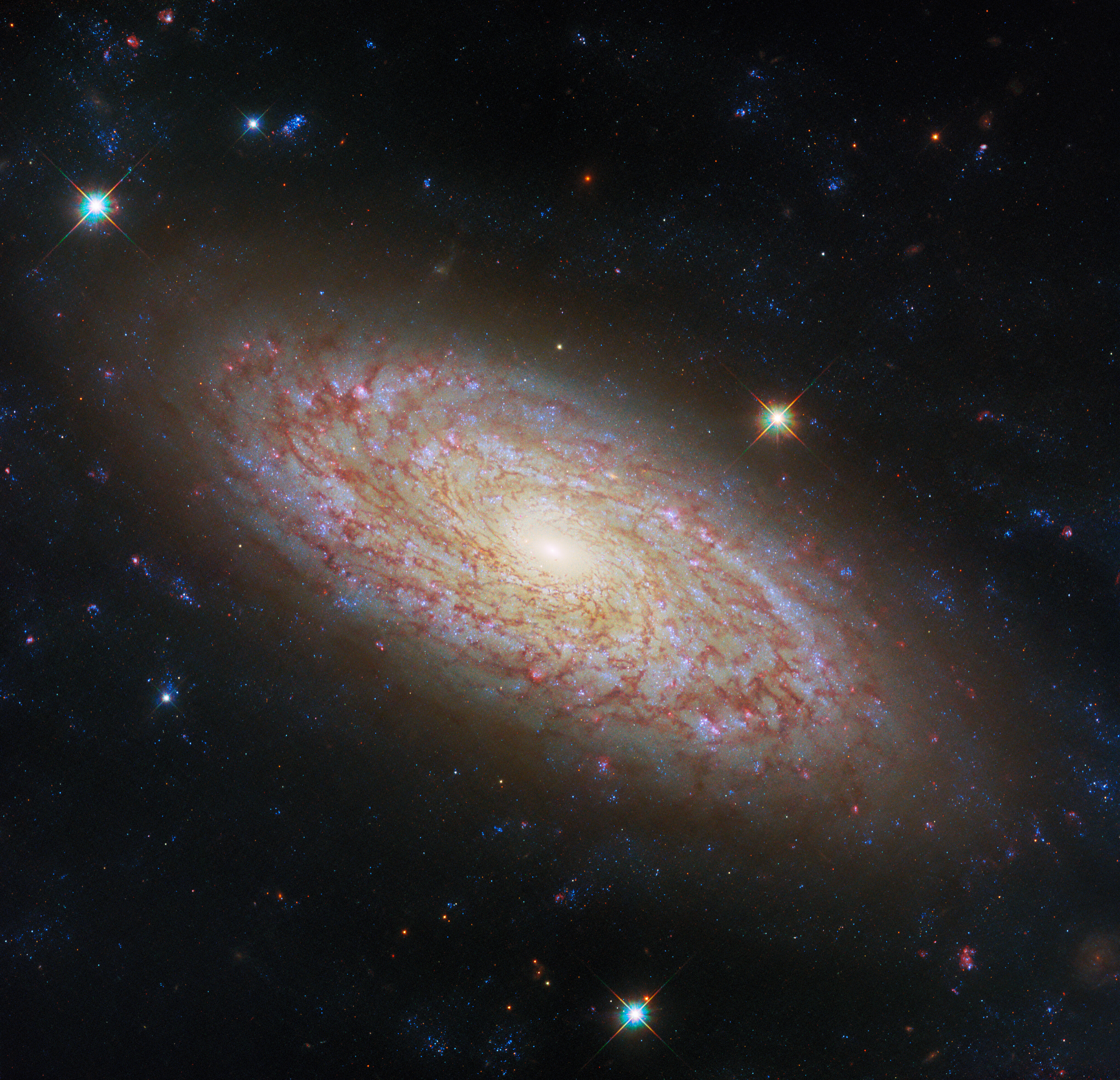
- NGC 2090 imaged by the Hubble Space Telescope in 2024

Observation data (J2000 epoch)
- Constellation: Columba
- Right ascension: 05^{h} 47^{m} 01.8982^{s}
- Declination: −34° 15′ 00.806″
- Redshift: 0.003075
- Heliocentric radial velocity: 922 ± 1 km/s
- Distance: 40.1 ± 2.9 Mly (12.3 ± 0.9 Mpc)
- Apparent magnitude (V): 11.20
- Apparent magnitude (B): 11.99

Characteristics
- Type: SA:(rs)c
- Size: ~111,200 ly (34.08 kpc) (estimated)
- Apparent size (V): 4.9′ × 2.4′

Other designations
- ESO 363- G 023, IRAS 05452-3416, MCG -06-13-009, PGC 17819

NGC 2090 is a spiral galaxy located in the constellation Columba. Its velocity with respect to the cosmic microwave background is 994 ± 5 km/s, which corresponds to a Hubble distance of 47.8 ± 3.4 Mly (14.65 ± 1.03 Mpc). However, 51 non-redshift measurements give a distance of 42.46 ± 0.64 Mly (13.018 ± 0.197 Mpc). It was discovered on 29 October 1826 by Scottish astronomer James Dunlop. NGC 2090 was studied to refine the Hubble constant to an accuracy within ±10%.

== See also ==
- List of NGC objects (2001–3000)

== Gallery ==
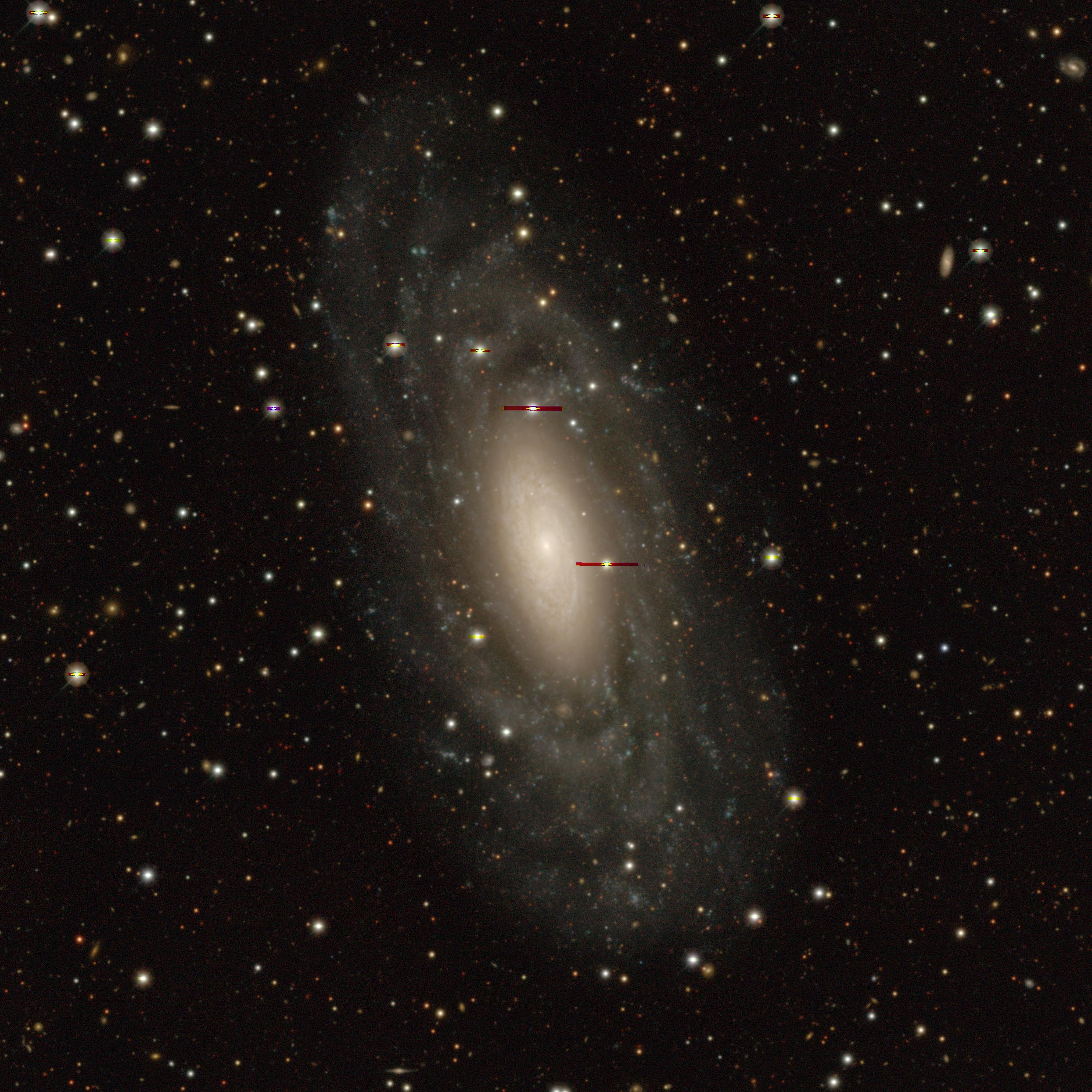
NGC 2090 with the legacy surveys

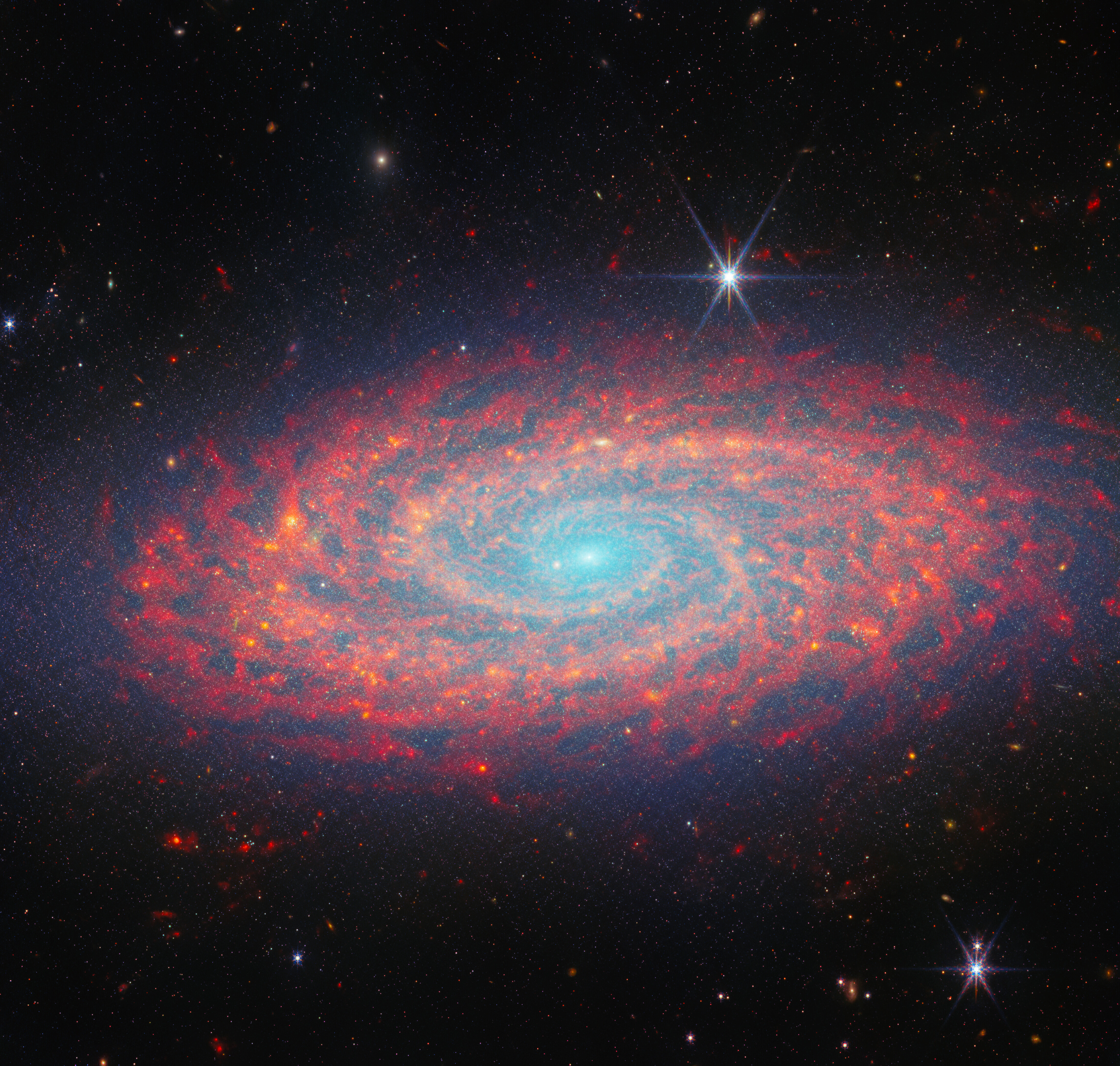
NGC 2090 imaged by the James Webb Space Telescope

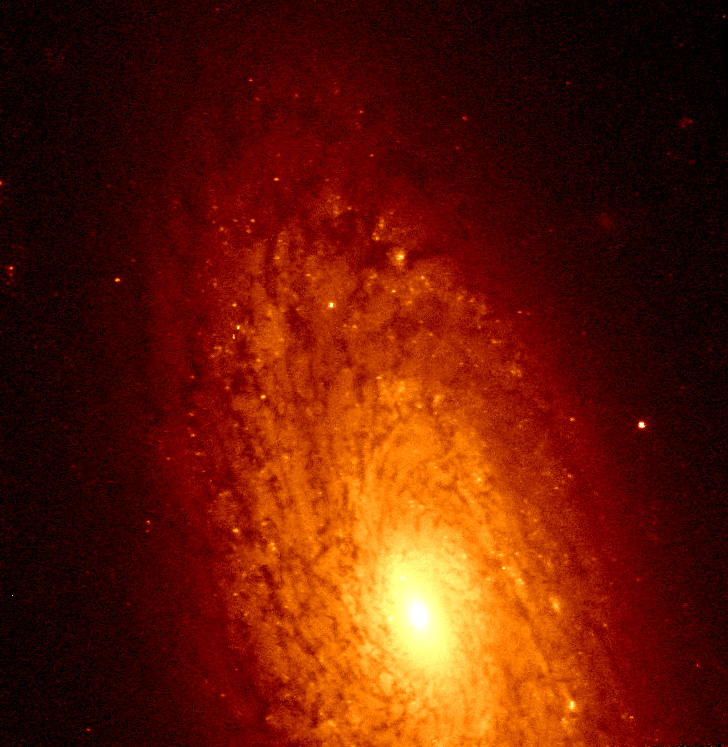
NGC 2090 captured by the Hubble Space Telescope in 2015.
