= NGC 1989 =

Galaxy in the constellation Columba

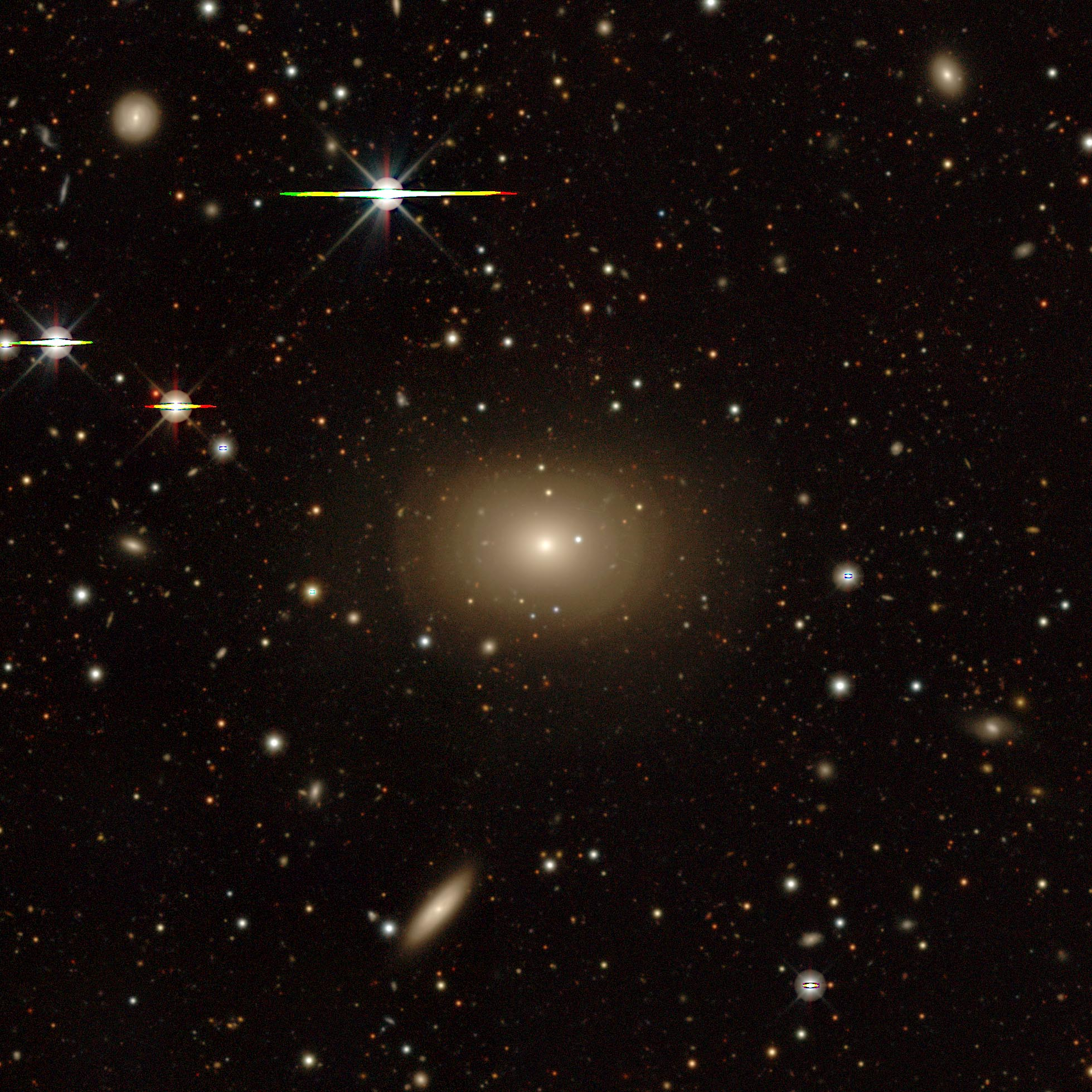
- legacy surveys image of NGC 1989

Observation data (J2000 epoch)
- Constellation: Columba
- Right ascension: 05^{h} 34^{m} 2342^{s}
- Declination: −30° 48′ 03.55″
- Redshift: 0.035858
- Heliocentric radial velocity: 10557
- Distance: 482 Million
- Apparent magnitude (V): 12.9
- Apparent magnitude (B): 14.13

Characteristics
- Type: S0
- Apparent size (V): 1.40 x 1.1arc minutes

Other designations
- ESO 423-21, MCG -5-14-4, AM 0532-304, PGC 17464

NGC 1989 (also known as ESO 423-21) is a lenticular galaxy in the constellation Columba. It is about 482 million light-years away from the Milky Way. The galaxy was discovered by John Herschel on January 28, 1835. Its apparent magnitude is 12.9 and its size is 1.40 by 1.1 arc minutes.
