= NGC 1992 =

Lenticular galaxy in the constellation Columba

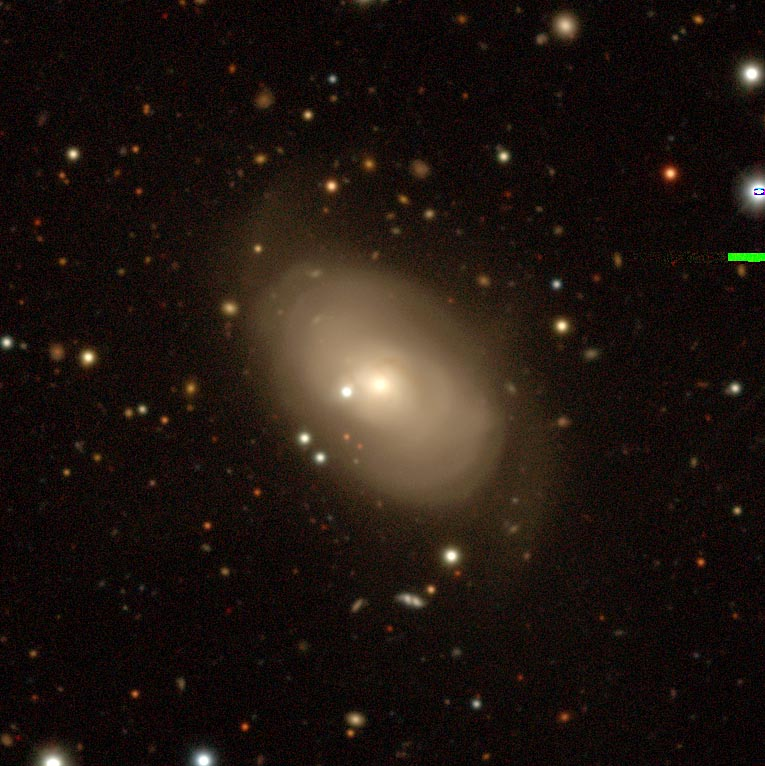
- The lenticular galaxy NGC 1992

Observation data (J2000.0 epoch)
- Constellation: Columba
- Right ascension: 05^{h} 34^{m} 31.8^{s}
- Declination: −30° 53′ 49″
- Redshift: 0.035361 +/- 0.000150
- Heliocentric radial velocity: 10601 +/- 45
- Distance: 473 million
- Apparent magnitude (V): 13.8
- Apparent magnitude (B): 14.65

Characteristics
- Type: SA0/a?(rs)
- Apparent size (V): 1.0 x 0.7 arc minutes

Other designations
- ESO 423- G 023, AM 0532-305, 2MASX J05343177-3053492, PGC 017466

NGC 1992 (also known as PGC 17466) is a lenticular galaxy located in the constellation Columba. It was discovered by John Herschel on November 19, 1835. It is about 473 million light years from the Milky Way, Its apparent magnitude is 14.65 and its size is 1.0 x 0.7 arc minutes.
