= Omicron Columbae =

Star in the constellation Columba

- Location of ο Columbae (circled in red)

Observation data Epoch J2000.0 Equinox J2000.0 (ICRS)
- Constellation: Columba
- Right ascension: 05^{h} 17^{m} 29.089^{s}
- Declination: −34° 53′ 42.723″
- Apparent magnitude (V): 4.81

Characteristics
- Spectral type: K1 IV or K1 III
- U−B color index: +0.80
- B−V color index: +1.00

Astrometry
Radial velocity (R_{v})	21.10±0.09 km/s
Proper motion (μ)	RA: +96.167 mas/yr Dec.: −339.569 mas/yr
Parallax (π)	30.7880±0.0975 mas
Distance	105.9 ± 0.3 ly (32.5 ± 0.1 pc)
Absolute magnitude (M_{V})	+2.17±0.04

Details
Mass	1.57±0.07 M_{☉}
Radius	5.04±0.14 R_{☉}
Luminosity	15.5 L_{☉}
Surface gravity (log g)	3.19±0.03 cgs
Temperature	4,936±28 K
Metallicity [Fe/H]	−0.04±0.04 dex
Rotational velocity (v sin i)	1.2 km/s
Age	2.17±0.28 Gyr

Other designations
- ο Col, CD−35°2214, FK5 197, HD 34642, HIP 24659, HR 1743, SAO 195721

Database references
SIMBAD	data

Omicron Columbae is a star in the southern constellation Columba. Its name is a Bayer designation that is Latinized from ο Columba, and abbreviated Omicron Col or ο Col. It has an apparent visual magnitude of 4.81, which is bright enough to be faintly visible to the naked eye. The distance to this star, as determined by an annual parallax shift of 30.79 mas, is 105.9 light-years (32.5 pc). The visual magnitude is reduced by an interstellar absorption factor of 0.06 due to intervening dust.

Depending on the source, this star has been given a stellar classification of K1 III or K1 IV, suggesting that it is a K-type star currently in the subgiant or giant stage of its evolution. It has 1.57 times the Sun's mass and has expanded to more than five times the radius of the Sun. The star appears to be spinning slowly with a projected rotational velocity of 1.2 km/s, and is around 2.2 billion years old. It is estimated to radiate 15.5 times the solar luminosity from its photosphere at an effective temperature of 4,936 K.

Omicron Columbae is a high proper motion star that may share a common proper motion with the object WISE J051723.87−345121.8. The two have an angular separation of 159 arc seconds.
