= HR 2131 =

Star in the constellation Columba

Observation data Epoch J2000.0 Equinox ICRS
- Constellation: Columba
- Right ascension: 06^{h} 01^{m} 16.298^{s}
- Declination: −33° 54′ 42.61″
- Apparent magnitude (V): 5.52±0.01

Characteristics
- Evolutionary stage: red giant branch
- Spectral type: K5 III
- U−B color index: +1.94
- B−V color index: +1.58

Astrometry
Radial velocity (R_{v})	19.0±7.4 km/s
Proper motion (μ)	RA: 4.876 mas/yr Dec.: −26.178 mas/yr
Parallax (π)	4.8320±0.0725 mas
Distance	670 ± 10 ly (207 ± 3 pc)
Absolute magnitude (M_{V})	−0.82

Details
Mass	1.81 M_{☉}
Radius	49.24 R_{☉}
Luminosity	501 L_{☉}
Surface gravity (log g)	1.7 cgs
Temperature	3,700±150 K
Metallicity [Fe/H]	0.00 dex
Rotational velocity (v sin i)	2.6±1.1 km/s
Age	2.19 Gyr

Other designations
- 67 G. Columbae, CD−33°2681, CPD−33°980, GC 7630, HD 41047, HIP 28524, HR 2131, SAO 196413

Database references
SIMBAD	data

HR 2131 (HD 41047) is a solitary star in the southern constellation Columba. It has an apparent magnitude of 5.52, allowing it to be faintly seen with the naked eye. The object is located at a distance of 670 light years but is receding with a heliocentric radial velocity of 19 km/s.

HR 2131 has a stellar classification of K5 III, indicating that it is a red giant. It has 1.81 times the mass of the Sun and is 2.19 billion years old. The star's high luminosity of 501 L_{☉} and a low effective temperature of 3,700 K causes it to have an enlarged radius 49 times that of the Sun. HR 2131's metallicity – elements heavier than helium – is around solar level; it spins with a projected rotational velocity of about 2.6 km/s.
