= Sigma Columbae =

Star in the constellation Columba

- Location of σ Columbae (circled in red)

Observation data Epoch J2000.0 Equinox J2000.0 (ICRS)
- Constellation: Columba
- Right ascension: 05^{h} 56^{m} 20.943^{s}
- Declination: −31° 22′ 56.780″
- Apparent magnitude (V): 5.51

Characteristics
- Spectral type: F2 III
- B−V color index: +0.39

Astrometry
Radial velocity (R_{v})	+19.4±2.9 km/s
Proper motion (μ)	RA: +0.692 mas/yr Dec.: +6.510 mas/yr
Parallax (π)	2.2952±0.0438 mas
Distance	1,420 ± 30 ly (436 ± 8 pc)
Absolute magnitude (M_{V})	−2.98

Details
Mass	3.79 M_{☉}
Luminosity	1,312 L_{☉}
Surface gravity (log g)	2.02 cgs
Temperature	6,820 K
Metallicity [Fe/H]	−0.91 dex
Rotational velocity (v sin i)	73.4±3.7 km/s
Age	400 Myr

Other designations
- σ Col, CD−31°2848, FK5 2454, GC 7499, HD 40248, HIP 28098, HR 2092, SAO 196330

Database references
SIMBAD	data

Sigma Columbae is a solitary, yellow-white hued star in the southern constellation of Columba. Its name is a Bayer designation that is Latinized from σ Columbae, and abbreviated Sigma Col or σ Col. This star is faintly visible to the naked eye with an apparent visual magnitude of 5.51. Based upon an annual parallax shift of 2.3 mas as seen from Earth, this star is located at a distance of approximately 1,420 light years from the Sun.

At an age of about 400 million years, the spectrum of this star suggests this is an evolved F-type giant with a stellar classification of F2 III. It is spinning with a projected rotational velocity of about 74 km/s, which is giving the star an oblate shape with an equatorial bulge that is 10% larger than the polar radius. It has 3.79 times the mass of the Sun and is radiating 1,312 times the Sun's luminosity from its enlarged photosphere at an effective temperature of 6,820 K.
