= HD 39901 =

Star in the constellation Columba

Observation data Epoch J2000.0 Equinox ICRS
- Constellation: Columba
- Right ascension: 05^{h} 53^{m} 22.85088^{s}
- Declination: −42° 55′ 16.7853″
- Apparent magnitude (V): 6.54±0.01

Characteristics
- Evolutionary stage: red giant branch
- Spectral type: K3 III
- B−V color index: +1.37

Astrometry
Radial velocity (R_{v})	−10.3±0.4 km/s
Proper motion (μ)	RA: +5.109 mas/yr Dec.: +11.405 mas/yr
Parallax (π)	5.1076±0.0152 mas
Distance	639 ± 2 ly (195.8 ± 0.6 pc)
Absolute magnitude (M_{V})	−0.03

Details
Mass	1.27 M_{☉}
Radius	21.9 R_{☉}
Luminosity	143±1 L_{☉}
Surface gravity (log g)	1.87 cgs
Temperature	4,373±122 K
Metallicity [Fe/H]	+0.08 dex
Rotational velocity (v sin i)	<1.6 km/s

Other designations
- 59 G. Columbae, CD−42°2205, CPD−42°769, GC 7431, HD 39901, HIP 27835, HR 2069, SAO 217599

Database references
SIMBAD	data

HD 39901 is an orange hued star located in the constellation Columba. It is also called HR 2069, which is the star's Bright Star Catalog designation. Eggen (1989) lists it as a member of the old disk population.

Despite the HR designation, the object has an apparent magnitude of 6.54, slightly past the limit for the naked eye visibility. As a result, it is barely visible to the unaided eye in the best conditions. Parallax measurements from the Gaia spacecraft place the object 639 light years away. It is approaching the Solar System with a heliocentric radial velocity of −10.3 km/s. At that distance, HD 39901's brightness is diminished by 0.33 magnitudes due to interstellar dust. It has an absolute magnitude of −0.03.

This is an evolved red giant star with a stellar classification of K3 III. It has a comparable mass to the Sun but has expanded to 21.9 times the latter's girth. It radiates 143 times the luminosity of the Sun from its photosphere at an effective temperature of 4,373 K. HD 39901 is slightly enriched in heavy elements with a metallicity 120% that of the Sun's. Like most giants, it spins slowly, having a projected rotational velocity lower than 1.6 km/s.
