= HD 41534 =

Binary star system in the constellation Columba

- Location of HD 41534 (circled in red)

Observation data Epoch J2000.0 Equinox J2000.0 (ICRS)
- Constellation: Columba
- Right ascension: 06^{h} 04^{m} 20.26526^{s}
- Declination: −32° 10′ 20.7449″
- Apparent magnitude (V): 5.65

Characteristics
- Evolutionary stage: main sequence
- Spectral type: B2V
- U−B color index: −0.82
- B−V color index: −0.186±0.003

Astrometry
| Radial velocity (R_{v}) | +93.0±3.7 km/s |
| Proper motion (μ) | RA: −16.439 mas/yr Dec.: +121.584 mas/yr |
| Parallax (π) | 3.4602±0.0631 mas |
| Distance | 940 ± 20 ly (289 ± 5 pc) |
| Absolute magnitude (M_{V}) | −1.78 |

Details
| Mass | 6.9+0.75 −0.68 M_{☉} |
| Radius | 3.90 R_{☉} |
| Luminosity | 1621 L_{☉} |
| Surface gravity (log g) | 4.0±0.25 cgs |
| Temperature | 20,000±1,000 K |
| Rotational velocity (v sin i) | 122 km/s |
| Age | 14+13 −8 Myr |

Other designations
- 72 G. Col, CD−32°1008, FK5 41534, GC 7708, HD 41534, HIP 28756, HR 2149, SAO 196459, PPM 282235, CCDM J06043-3210AB, WDS J06043-3210AB

Database references
| SIMBAD | data |

HD 41534 is a binary star system in the southern constellation of Columba. It is dimply visible to the naked eye with a combined apparent visual magnitude of 5.65. The distance to this system is approximately 940 light-years based on parallax, and it is receding from the Sun with a radial velocity of +93 km/s. This is a runaway star system with an unusually high peculiar velocity of 187.6+12.2
−13.8 km/s. It is thought to have been ejected from the OB association Sco OB 1 approximately 14 million years ago.

The primary component is a B-type main-sequence star with a stellar classification of B2V. It displays microvariability with an amplitude of 0.0086 in magnitude and a frequency of 0.11316 cycles per day. The star is an estimated 14 million years old with a high rate of spin, showing a projected rotational velocity of 122. It has seven times the mass of the Sun and about four times the Sun's radius. HD 41534 is radiating over 1,600 times the luminosity of the Sun from its photosphere at an effective temperature of 20,000 K.
