= HD 44506 =

Star in the constellation of Columba

- Location of HD 44506 (circled in red)

Observation data Epoch J2000.0 Equinox ICRS
- Constellation: Columba
- Right ascension: 06^{h} 20^{m} 36.23979^{s}
- Declination: −34° 08′ 38.9169″
- Apparent magnitude (V): 5.52 (5.48 - 5.55)

Characteristics
- Spectral type: B3V
- U−B color index: −0.89
- B−V color index: −0.20
- Variable type: suspected

Astrometry
Radial velocity (R_{v})	54±4 km/s
Proper motion (μ)	RA: +0.641 mas/yr Dec.: +20.709 mas/yr
Parallax (π)	1.7701±0.0990 mas
Distance	1,800 ± 100 ly (560 ± 30 pc)
Absolute magnitude (M_{V})	−3.28

Details
Mass	12.2±0.3 M_{☉}
Radius	13.5^{+0.1}_{−0.2} R_{☉}
Luminosity (bolometric)	18,951 L_{☉}
Surface gravity (log g)	3.21 cgs
Temperature	16,838 K
Metallicity [Fe/H]	−0.7801 dex
Rotational velocity (v sin i)	220±22 km/s
Age	13±2 Myr

Other designations
- 90 G. Columbae, CD−34°2806, CPD−34°898, GC 8180, HD 44506, HIP 30143, HR 2288, SAO 196707

Database references
SIMBAD	data

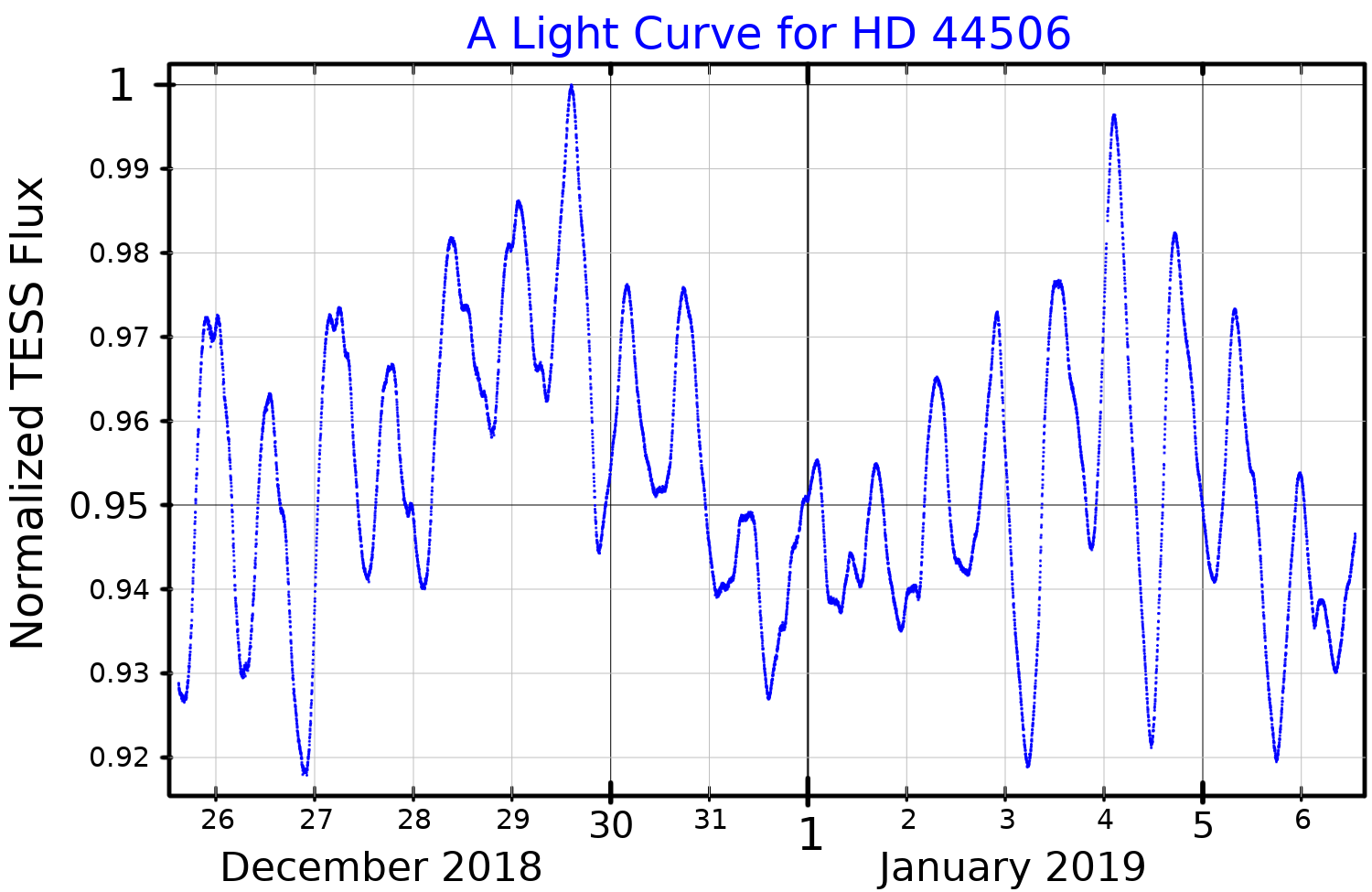
A light curve for HD 44506, plotted from TESS data

HD 44506 is a solitary, blue hued star located in the southern constellation Columba. The object is also called HR 2288, which is its Bright Star Catalog designation. It has an average apparent magnitude of 5.52, making it faintly visible to the naked eye under ideal conditions. HD 44506 is located relatively far at a distance of 1,800 light years based on Gaia DR3 parallax measurements but is receding with a heliocentric radial velocity of 54 km/s.

Emission lines were first noticed in HD 44506's spectrum in 1964. They were again observed by Karl G. Heinze. It has been suspected to be variable since 1963, but a 1977 search for β Cepheids found inconclusive results; the star is variable in the visual passband but not the ultraviolet passband. As of 2017, the GCVS lists HD 44506 as a suspected variable. In 1982, HD 44506 was officially catalogued as a Be star by Mecerdes Jaschek and Daniel Egret. The VSX lists this star as a GCAS-type variable. In a 2021 study based on TESS data, its variability type was classified as BE+ROT.

This is a hot B-type main-sequence star with a stellar classification of B3V. It has 12.2 times the mass of the Sun and is estimated to be 13 million years old. HD 44506 has a radius of 13.5 R_{☉} and an effective temperature of 16,838 K. This yields a bolometric luminosity 18,951 times that of the Sun from its photosphere. Like many hot stars it spins rapidly, having a projected rotational velocity of 220 km/s.
