= Eta Columbae =

Star in the constellation Columba

η Columbae
- Location of η Columbae (circled in red)

Observation data Epoch J2000.0 Equinox J2000.0 (ICRS)
- Constellation: Columba
- Right ascension: 05^{h} 59^{m} 08.805^{s}
- Declination: −42° 48′ 54.48″
- Apparent magnitude (V): 3.96

Characteristics
- Spectral type: G8/K1 II or K0 III
- U−B color index: +1.08
- B−V color index: +1.14

Astrometry
Radial velocity (R_{v})	+17.0 km/s
Proper motion (μ)	RA: +118.897 mas/yr Dec.: −11.038 mas/yr
Parallax (π)	7.4021±0.1207 mas
Distance	441 ± 7 ly (135 ± 2 pc)
Absolute magnitude (M_{V})	−2.10

Details
Mass	4.70±0.04 M_{☉}
Radius	35.6±0.9 R_{☉}
Luminosity	564^{+18}_{−16} L_{☉}
Surface gravity (log g)	1.799±0.013 cgs
Temperature	4,715^{+4}_{−5} K
Metallicity [Fe/H]	−0.01 dex

Other designations
- η Col, CD−42°2266, FK5 229, HD 40808, HIP 28328, HR 2120, SAO 217650

Database references
SIMBAD	data

Eta Columbae is a solitary star near the southern boundary of the constellation Columba. Its name is a Bayer designation that is Latinized from η Columbae, and abbreviated Eta Col or η Col. This star is visible to the naked eye, having an apparent visual magnitude of 3.96. Based upon an annual parallax shift of 7.40 mas, it lies at a distance of approximately 441 light-years (135 pc) from the Sun. It is drifting further away with a line of sight velocity component of +17 km/s.

This is an orange-hued K-type giant star with a stellar classification of K0 III, or possibly a bright giant with a crossover class of G8/K1 II. It has an estimated 4.7 times the mass of the Sun and has expanded to 35.6 times the Sun's radius. This star is radiating 564 times the solar luminosity from its photosphere at an effective temperature of 4,715 K.
