= HD 47475 =

Star in the constellation Columba

- Location of HD 47475 (circled in red)

Observation data Epoch J2000 Equinox ICRS
- Constellation: Columba
- Right ascension: 06^{h} 36^{m} 51.27308^{s}
- Declination: −41° 33′ 25.6990″
- Apparent magnitude (V): 6.34±0.01

Characteristics
- Spectral type: K0 II
- B−V color index: +1.15

Astrometry
Radial velocity (R_{v})	13.8±0.4 km/s
Proper motion (μ)	RA: +1.235 mas/yr Dec.: +7.745 mas/yr
Parallax (π)	1.835±0.0171 mas
Distance	1,780 ± 20 ly (545 ± 5 pc)
Absolute magnitude (M_{V})	−2.01

Details
Mass	4.0 M_{☉}
Radius	44.8 R_{☉}
Luminosity	1,035 L_{☉}
Surface gravity (log g)	1.66 cgs
Temperature	4,845±122 K
Metallicity [Fe/H]	−0.3 dex
Rotational velocity (v sin i)	5.5±2 km/s

Other designations
- 111 G. Columbae, CD−41 2488, HD 47475, HIP 31603, HR 2445, SAO 218060

Database references
SIMBAD	data

HD 47475 (HR 2445) is a solitary star located in the southern constellation Columba. With an apparent magnitude of 6.34, its barely visible to the naked eye under ideal conditions. The star is located 1,720 light years away from the Solar System, but is drifting away with a heliocentric radial velocity of 15.77 km/s.

== Properties ==
HD 47475 has a classification of K0 II, which states its a bright giant that has exhausted hydrogen at its core and left the main sequence. It has four times the Sun's mass, but has expanded to 45 times the Sun's radius. It radiates at about 1,000 times the Sun's luminosity from its enlarged photosphere from an effective temperature of 4,845 K. HD 47475 has a projected rotational velocity of 5 km/s, which is fast for its class.
