= HD 47500 =

Binary star in the constellation Columba

- Location of HD 47500 (circled in red)

Observation data Epoch J2000 Equinox ICRS
- Constellation: Columba
- A
- Right ascension: 06^{h} 37^{m} 13.838^{s}
- Declination: −36° 59′ 26.37″
- Apparent magnitude (V): 5.91±0.01
- B
- Right ascension: 06^{h} 37^{m} 13.837^{s}
- Declination: −36° 59′ 25.91″
- Apparent magnitude (V): 7.51±0.01

Characteristics

A
- Evolutionary stage: main sequence
- Spectral type: B6 IV-V
- U−B color index: −0.52
- B−V color index: −0.12

Astrometry
Radial velocity (R_{v})	21±4 km/s
Proper motion (μ)	RA: −9.053 mas/yr Dec.: +11.625 mas/yr
Parallax (π)	2.9218±0.2076 mas
Distance	1,120 ± 80 ly (340 ± 20 pc)
Absolute magnitude (M_{V})	−1.93

Details

A
Mass	5.01±0.05 M_{☉}
Radius	7.33 R_{☉}
Luminosity	1,482+665 −459 L_{☉}
Surface gravity (log g)	3.61 cgs
Temperature	14,703±290 K
Metallicity [Fe/H]	−0.07 dex
Rotational velocity (v sin i)	36 km/s
Age	34±1 Myr

Other designations
- 112 G. Columbae, CD−36°3031, CPD−36°1014, GC 8658, HD 47500, HIP 31637, HR 2446, SAO 197014, WDS J06372-3659AB

Database references
SIMBAD	The system
- A
- B

HD 47500, also known as HR 2446, is a binary star in the southern constellation Columba. The primary has an apparent magnitude of 5.91, making it faintly visible to the naked eye if viewed under ideal conditions. As for the companion, its visual magnitude is 7.51. The system is located relatively far at a distance of 1,120 light years based on parallax measurements, and is receding with a heliocentric radial velocity of 21 km/s.

The binary nature of this system was first discovered by Richard Alfred Rossiter in 1942. Their current separation is half of an arcsecond, making it difficult to measure the components properties. Nevertheless, the secondary component is located along a position angle of 4° as of 1999.

HD 47500 has a stellar classification of B6 IV-V, a B-type star with a luminosity class intermediate between a subgiant and main sequence star. Hube (1970) gave the primary a slightly cooler class of B7 III, indicating that it is already a giant star, while Houk (1982) gave it a class of B5/7 IV, intermediate between a B5 and B7 subgiant. Nevertheless, it is estimated to be 34 million years old, having completed 98.5% of its main sequence lifetime. HD 47500 A has 5.01 times the mass of the Sun and an enlarged radius of 7.33 R_{☉}. It radiates 1,482 times the luminosity of the Sun. from its photosphere at an effective temperature of 14,703 K, giving it a bluish-white hue. Unlike most hot stars, the object spins modestly with a projected rotational velocity of 36 km/s.
