= HD 36848 =

Star in the constellation Columba

Observation data Epoch J2000.0 Equinox J2000.0 (ICRS)
- Constellation: Columba
- Right ascension: 05^{h} 32^{m} 51.4130^{s}
- Declination: −38° 30′ 48.131″
- Apparent magnitude (V): 5.46±0.01

Characteristics
- Evolutionary stage: red giant branch
- Spectral type: K2/3 III
- B−V color index: +1.22

Astrometry
Radial velocity (R_{v})	−0.6±0.1 km/s
Proper motion (μ)	RA: +48.475 mas/yr Dec.: −10.959 mas/yr
Parallax (π)	18.7844±0.0462 mas
Distance	173.6 ± 0.4 ly (53.2 ± 0.1 pc)
Absolute magnitude (M_{V})	+1.84

Details
Mass	1.18 M_{☉}
Radius	8.71^{+0.62}_{−0.58} R_{☉}
Luminosity	24.54 L_{☉}
Surface gravity (log g)	2.7±0.2 cgs
Temperature	4,460±70 K
Metallicity [Fe/H]	+0.28±0.05 dex
Rotational velocity (v sin i)	<2.7 km/s
Age	7.33 Gyr

Other designations
- 24 G. Columbae, CD−38°2085, CPD−38°653, GC 6889, HD 36848, HIP 25993, HR 1877, SAO 195948

Database references
SIMBAD	data

HD 36848 (HR 1877) is a star in the southern constellation Columba. It has an apparent magnitude of 5.46, allowing it to be faintly seen with a naked eye. The star is relatively close at a distance of 174 light years and is moving closer with a heliocentric radial velocity of only −0.6 km/s.

HD 36848 has a stellar classification of K2/3 III — intermediate between a K2 and 3 giant star. It is on the red giant branch, meaning it has exhausted its core hydrogen and is now fusing hydrogen in a shell outside the core. It has a comparable mass to the Sun but has expanded to 8.71 times the radius of the Sun after 7.33 billion years. It shines with a luminosity of 24.5 L_{☉} from its enlarged photosphere at an effective temperature of 4,460 K, giving t an orange hue. The star is metal enriched with an iron abundance 90% greater than that of the Sun and spins with a projected rotational velocity lower than 2.7 km/s.

The star's multiplicity status isn't generally agreed on. Eggleton et al. classifies it as a solitary star while De Mederios et al. finds it to be a probable spectroscopic binary.
