= HD 34266 =

Solitary star in the constellation Columba

- Location of HD 34266 (circled)

Observation data Epoch J2000 Equinox ICRS
- Constellation: Columba
- Right ascension: 05^{h} 14^{m} 28.84578^{s}
- Declination: −35° 58′ 37.1904″
- Apparent magnitude (V): 5.73±0.01

Characteristics
- Evolutionary stage: Red giant branch
- Spectral type: G8 III
- B−V color index: +1.01

Astrometry
Radial velocity (R_{v})	13.2±2.9 km/s
Proper motion (μ)	RA: +11.005 mas/yr Dec.: +13.944 mas/yr
Parallax (π)	6.046±0.0316 mas
Distance	539 ± 3 ly (165.4 ± 0.9 pc)
Absolute magnitude (M_{V})	−0.16

Details
Mass	3.42±0.14 M_{☉}
Radius	16.2±0.4 R_{☉}
Luminosity	144±4 L_{☉}
Surface gravity (log g)	2.68±0.12 cgs
Temperature	4,970±49 K
Metallicity [Fe/H]	+0.04±0.04 dex
Rotational velocity (v sin i)	2.3±1.2 km/s
Age	490 Myr

Other designations
- 6 G. Columbae, CD−36°2127, CPD−36°676, GC 6421, HD 34266, HIP 24426, HR 1721, SAO 195683

Database references
SIMBAD	data

HD 34266, also known as HR 1721, is a solitary, yellow hued star located in the southern constellation Columba, the dove. It has an apparent magnitude of 5.73, making it faintly visible to the naked eye under ideal conditions. Based on Gaia DR3 parallax measurements, the object is located 539 light years away. It appears to be drifting away from the Solar System, having a heliocentric radial velocity of 13.2 km/s.

This is an evolved giant star that is currently on the red giant branch, fusing hydrogen in a shell around an inert helium core. It has a stellar classification of G8 III. HD 34266 is calculated to be 490 million years old, almost 10 times younger than the Sun. However, it already left the main sequence due to a mass of 3.42 M_{☉}. HD 34266 has expanded to 16.2 times the Sun's girth and now radiates 144 times the luminosity of the Sun from its photosphere at an effective temperature of 4,970 K. HD 34266 has a near solar metallicity and spins modestly with a projected rotational velocity of 2.3 km/s.
