= AF Columbae =

Star in the constellation of Columba

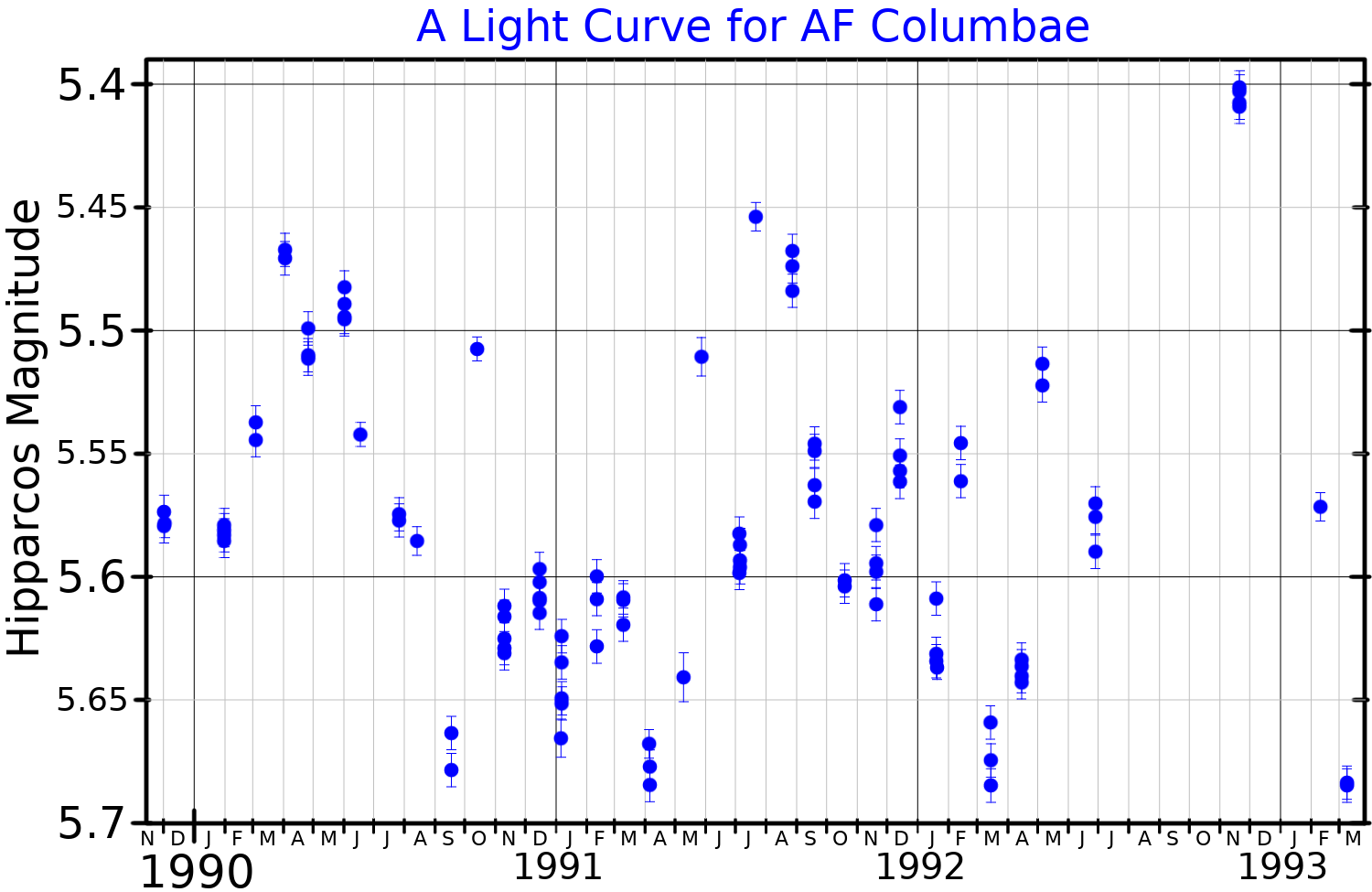
- A light curve for AF Columbae, plotted from Hipparcos data

Observation data Epoch J2000.0 Equinox ICRS
- Constellation: Columba
- Right ascension: 06^{h} 10^{m} 10.40393^{s}
- Declination: −40° 21′ 13.6464″
- Apparent magnitude (V): 5.60 - 5.71

Characteristics
- Evolutionary stage: AGB
- Spectral type: M2 II/III
- B−V color index: +1.68
- Variable type: Lb

Astrometry
Radial velocity (R_{v})	−19±7.4 km/s
Proper motion (μ)	RA: −20.650 mas/yr Dec.: +74.080 mas/yr
Parallax (π)	3.9737±0.0841 mas
Distance	820 ± 20 ly (252 ± 5 pc)
Absolute magnitude (M_{V})	−1.53

Details
Mass	1.54 M_{☉}
Radius	148 R_{☉}
Luminosity (bolometric)	1,853 L_{☉}
Surface gravity (log g)	0.26 cgs
Temperature	3,611±122 K

Other designations
- 82 G. Columbae, AF Col, NSV 2864, CD−40°2291, CPD−40°930, GC 7873, HD 42682, HIP 29263, HR 2203, SAO 217753

Database references
SIMBAD	data

AF Columbae, also known as HD 42682, is a solitary, red hued variable star located in the southern constellation Columba, the dove. It has an apparent magnitude that fluctuates between 5.6 and 5.71. Nevertheless, it is faintly visible to the naked eye. Parallax measurements from the Gaia spacecraft place the star relatively far at a distance of 820 light years. However, it is approaching the Solar System with a poorly constrained radial velocity of −19 km/s.

AF Columbae is a red giant that is currently on the asymptotic giant branch, generating energy via hydrogen and helium shell burning. It has a stellar classification of M2 II/III, indicating an evolved M-type star with the blended luminosity class of a regular giant star and a bright giant. At present it has 1.54 times the mass of the Sun but has expanded to 148 times its girth. It shines with a bolometric luminosity 1,853 times that of the Sun from its enlarged photosphere at an effective temperature of 3,611 K.

The star was discovered to be a variable star when the Hipparcos data was analyzed. It was given its variable star designation, AF Columbae, in 1999. The object is classified as a slow irregular variable of subtype Lb. Tabur et al. (2009) found 5 periods for AF Columbae. Most of them last for 40-50 days, while one of them last for 112 days. It appears to be a runaway star, having an unusually high peculiar velocity of 93.2+4.6
−5.2 km/s.
