= HD 40091 =

Star in the constellation Columba

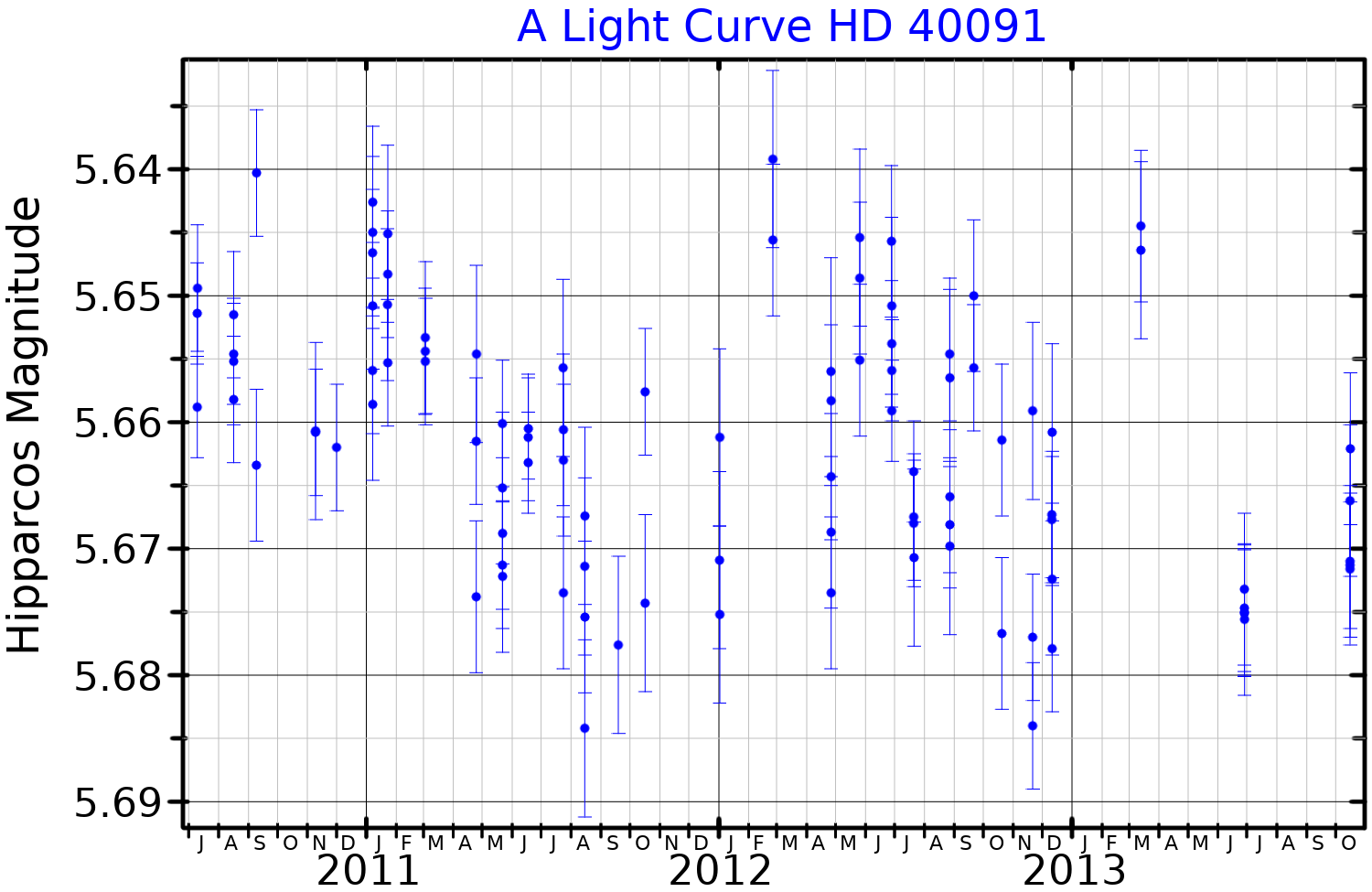
- A light curve for HD 40091, plotted from Hipparcos data

Observation data Epoch J2000.0 Equinox ICRS
- Constellation: Columba
- Right ascension: 05^{h} 54^{m} 52.48300^{s}
- Declination: −39° 57′ 28.2946″
- Apparent magnitude (V): 5.54±0.01

Characteristics
- Spectral type: M0 III
- U−B color index: +1.85
- B−V color index: +1.51
- Variable type: suspected

Astrometry
Radial velocity (R_{v})	114±2 km/s
Proper motion (μ)	RA: −11.977 mas/yr Dec.: +21.203 mas/yr
Parallax (π)	6.5078±0.1112 mas
Distance	501 ± 9 ly (154 ± 3 pc)
Absolute magnitude (M_{V})	−0.4

Details
Mass	1.21 M_{☉}
Radius	52.43 R_{☉}
Luminosity	392 L_{☉}
Surface gravity (log g)	1.31 cgs
Temperature	3,969±122 K
Metallicity [Fe/H]	+0.14 dex

Other designations
- 60 G. Columbae, NSV 16734, CD−39°2260, CPD−39°789, FK5 2449, GC 7471, HD 40091, HIP 27955, HR 2082, SAO 196309

Database references
SIMBAD	data

HD 40091, also known as HR 2082, is a solitary star located in the southern constellation Columba, the dove. It has an apparent magnitude of 5.54, making it faintly visible to the naked eye under ideal conditions. Based on parallax measurements from the Gaia spacecraft, the object is estimated to be 501 light years distant. However, it is rapidly receding with a high heliocentric radial velocity of 114 km/s.

This is an evolved red giant with a stellar classification of M0 III. It has 121% the mass of the Sun but has expanded to 52.43 times its girth. It radiates 392 times the luminosity of the Sun from its enlarged photosphere at an effective temperature of 3,969 K, giving it a red hue. HD 40091 is slightly metal enriched, having an iron abundance 38% above solar levels.

HD 40091 is found to vary between 5.64 and 5.68 in the Hipparcos passband, but it is not confirmed to be a variable star. Therefore, it is catalogued in the GCVS as a suspected variable.
