= HD 34868 =

Star in the constellation Columba

Observation data Epoch J2000 Equinox ICRS
- Constellation: Columba
- Right ascension: 05^{h} 19^{m} 23.685^{s}
- Declination: −27° 22′ 07.98″
- Apparent magnitude (V): 5.972±0.002

Characteristics
- Evolutionary stage: main sequence
- Spectral type: A0 V or A1 IV
- B−V color index: −0.04

Astrometry
Radial velocity (R_{v})	18±4 km/s
Proper motion (μ)	RA: −3.366 mas/yr Dec.: −8.459 mas/yr
Parallax (π)	7.9531±0.0288 mas
Distance	410 ± 1 ly (125.7 ± 0.5 pc)
Absolute magnitude (M_{V})	+0.35

Details
Mass	2.73±0.08 M_{☉}
Radius	3.00±0.44 R_{☉}
Luminosity	82.3+13 −11.3 L_{☉}
Surface gravity (log g)	3.94 cgs
Temperature	9,908±92 K
Metallicity [Fe/H]	−0.12 dex
Rotational velocity (v sin i)	103 km/s
Age	245±19 Myr

Other designations
- 12 G. Columbae, CD−27 2204, HD 34868, HIP 24831, HR 1758, SAO 170311

Database references
SIMBAD	data

HD 34868 (HR 1758) is a solitary star located in the southern constellation Columba. With an apparent magnitude of 5.97, it's barely visible to the unaided eye. The star is located 410 light years away based on parallax, but is drifting away with a heliocentric radial velocity of 18 km/s.

== Properties ==
HD 34868 is an ordinary A-type main-sequence star with a mass of 2.73 solar masses, and a radius of 3 solar radii. It radiates at 82 solar luminosities from its photosphere at an effective temperature of 9,908 K, which gives it a blueish-white hue of an A0 star. HD 34868 has a rapid projected rotational velocity of 103 km/s, and is a young star, with an age of 245 million years. However, some sources give it a classification of A1 IV, which makes it a subgiant star.
