= HD 37811 =

Star in the constellation of Columba

Observation data Epoch J2000.0 Equinox J2000.0 (ICRS)
- Constellation: Columba
- Right ascension: 05^{h} 39^{m} 49.8397^{s}
- Declination: −32° 37′ 45.1772″
- Apparent magnitude (V): 5.44±0.01

Characteristics
- Evolutionary stage: RGB
- Spectral type: G6/8 III
- B−V color index: +0.92

Astrometry
Radial velocity (R_{v})	−8.3±2 km/s
Proper motion (μ)	RA: −16.691 mas/yr Dec.: −31.588 mas/yr
Parallax (π)	8.5366±0.0492 mas
Distance	382 ± 2 ly (117.1 ± 0.7 pc)
Absolute magnitude (M_{V})	+0.14

Details
Mass	3.0±0.1 M_{☉}
Radius	11.68±0.20 R_{☉}
Luminosity	86±2 L_{☉}
Surface gravity (log g)	2.81±0.08 cgs
Temperature	5,139±34 K
Metallicity [Fe/H]	0.01±0.03 dex
Rotational velocity (v sin i)	2.4±1.1 km/s
Age	440 Myr

Other designations
- 39 G. Columbae, CD−32°2479, CPD−32°879, GC 7082, HD 37811, HIP 26649, HR 1958, SAO 196061

Database references
SIMBAD	data

HD 37811 (HR 1958) is a solitary star in the southern constellation Columba. It has an apparent magnitude of 5.44, allowing it to be faintly seen with the naked eye. Parallax measurements place the object at a distance of 382 light years and it is currently approaching with a heliocentric radial velocity of −8.3 km/s.

HD 37811 has a stellar classification of G6/8 III — intermediate between a G6 and G8 giant star that is currently on the red giant branch. It has 3 times the mass of the Sun but has expanded to 11.7 times its girth at an age of 440 million years. It shines with a luminosity of 86 L_{☉} from its enlarged photosphere at an effective temperature of 5,139 K, giving a yellow glow. HD 37811 has a solar metallicity and spins leisurely with a projected rotational velocity of about 2.4 km/s.
