= Xi Columbae =

Star in the constellation Columba

- Location of ξ Columbae (circled in red)

Observation data Epoch J2000.0 Equinox J2000.0 (ICRS)
- Constellation: Columba
- Right ascension: 05^{h} 55^{m} 29.91038^{s}
- Declination: −37° 07′ 14.3232″
- Apparent magnitude (V): 4.97

Characteristics
- Spectral type: K1 III CNII
- B−V color index: +1.096

Astrometry
Radial velocity (R_{v})	+59.5 km/s
Proper motion (μ)	RA: +38.020 mas/yr Dec.: −23.491 mas/yr
Parallax (π)	10.0920±0.1408 mas
Distance	323 ± 5 ly (99 ± 1 pc)
Absolute magnitude (M_{V})	−0.05

Orbit
Period (P)	1420.6 d
Semi-major axis (a)	3.60 AU
Eccentricity (e)	0.39
Semi-amplitude (K_{1}) (primary)	5.68 km/s

Details
Radius	16.23+0.14 −2.27 R_{☉}
Luminosity	120±2 L_{☉}
Surface gravity (log g)	2.26 cgs
Temperature	4,743+372 −20 K
Metallicity [Fe/H]	+0.29 dex
Rotational velocity (v sin i)	2.6 km/s

Other designations
- ξ Col, CD−37°2487, HD 40176, HIP 28010, HR 2087, SAO 196316

Database references
SIMBAD	data

Xi Columbae is a binary star system in the southern constellation of Columba. With an apparent visual magnitude of 4.97, it is faintly visible to the naked eye. Based upon an annual parallax shift of 10.1 mas, it is located around 323 light years from the Sun. The system is a member of the HR 1614 supergroup, and is drifting further away with a radial velocity of +59.5 km/s,

This is an astrometric binary with an orbital period of 1,420.6 days and an eccentricity of 0.39. The primary is an evolved K-type giant star with a stellar classification of K1 III CNII, showing an overabundance of CN in its spectrum. The star has expanded to 16 times the radius of the Sun and is radiating 120 times the Sun's luminosity from its swollen photosphere at an effective temperature of 4,743 K. The companion has a mass of at least 59% that of the Sun.
