= HD 46815 =

Star in the constellation of Columba

- Location of HD 46815 (circled in red)

Observation data Epoch J2000.0 Equinox ICRS
- Constellation: Columba
- Right ascension: 06^{h} 33^{m} 49.4800^{s}
- Declination: −36° 13′ 55.295″
- Apparent magnitude (V): 5.40±0.01

Characteristics
- Spectral type: K3 III
- U−B color index: +1.72
- B−V color index: +1.42

Astrometry
Radial velocity (R_{v})	32.2±2.8 km/s
Proper motion (μ)	RA: −15.622 mas/yr Dec.: +99.481 mas/yr
Parallax (π)	7.9846±0.0528 mas
Distance	408 ± 3 ly (125.2 ± 0.8 pc)
Absolute magnitude (M_{V})	+0.03

Details
Mass	1.17 M_{☉}
Radius	24.15 R_{☉}
Luminosity	180±2 L_{☉}
Surface gravity (log g)	1.68 cgs
Temperature	4,297±122 K
Metallicity [Fe/H]	+0.08 dex
Rotational velocity (v sin i)	2.3±1.2 km/s

Other designations
- 106 G. Columba, CD−36°2990, CPD−36°994, GC 8559, HD 46815, HIP 31299, HR 2411, SAO 196945

Database references
SIMBAD	data

HD 46815 (HR 2411) is a solitary star in the southern constellation Columba. It is faintly visible to the naked eye with an apparent magnitude of 5.4 and is estimated to be 408 light years away. However, it is receding with a heliocentric radial velocity of 32.2 km/s.

HD 46815 has a stellar classification of K3 III, indicating that it is a red giant. At present it has 117% the mass of the Sun but has expanded to 24.15 times its girth. It shines with a luminosity of 180 L_{☉} from its enlarged photosphere at an effective temperature of 4,297 K, giving an orange hue. HD 46815 has a metallicity 120% that of the Sun and is believed to be a member of the old disk. Due to it being a giant star, it has a low projected rotational velocity of 2.3 km/s.
