= WASP-63 =

Star in the constellation Columba

Observation data Epoch J2000 Equinox J2000
- Constellation: Columba
- Right ascension: 06^{h} 17^{m} 20.7485^{s}
- Declination: −38° 19′ 23.754″
- Apparent magnitude (V): 11.10±0.08

Characteristics
- Evolutionary stage: subgiant
- Spectral type: G8
- B−V color index: 0.741±0.022
- J−K color index: 0.425±0.032

Astrometry
Radial velocity (R_{v})	−23.55±0.25 km/s
Proper motion (μ)	RA: −17.469 mas/yr Dec.: −27.292 mas/yr
Parallax (π)	3.4609±0.0118 mas
Distance	942 ± 3 ly (288.9 ± 1.0 pc)

Details
Mass	1.10^{+0.06}_{−0.04} M_{☉}
Radius	1.76^{+0.11}_{−0.08} R_{☉}
Luminosity	2.76 L_{☉}
Surface gravity (log g)	4.01±0.03 cgs
Temperature	5,715±60 K
Metallicity [Fe/H]	0.08±0.07 dex 0.28±0.05 dex
Rotational velocity (v sin i)	2.8±0.5 km/s
Age	8.3^{+1.3}_{−1.2} Gyr

Other designations
- Kosjenka, CD−38 2551, TOI-483, WASP-63, TYC 7612-556-1, GSC 07612-00556, 2MASS J06172074-3819237

Database references
SIMBAD	data
Exoplanet Archive	data

WASP-63, also named Kosjenka, is a single star with an exoplanetary companion in the southern constellation of Columba. It is too faint to be visible with the naked eye, having an apparent visual magnitude of 11.1. The distance to this system is approximately 942 light-years (289 parsecs) based on parallax measurements, but it is drifting closer with a radial velocity of −24 km/s.

== Nomenclature ==
The designation WASP-63 indicates that this was the 63rd star found to have a planet by the Wide Angle Search for Planets. It is also known as CD-38 2551 from the Durchmusterung catalog.

In the 2019 NameExoWorlds campaign, this system was assigned to Malawi but did not get named at that time. It was then included among 20 systems to be named by the following NameExoWorlds campaign in August 2022. The approved names, proposed by a team from Croatia, were announced in June 2023. WASP-63 is named Kosjenka and its planet is named Regoč, after characters from Croatian Tales of Long Ago by Ivana Brlić-Mažuranić.

== Stellar properties ==
This is a G-type star with a stellar classification of G8; the luminosity class is currently unknown. The star is much older than the Sun at approximately 8.3^{+1.3}_{−1.2} billion years. WASP-63 is slightly enriched in heavy elements, having 120% of the solar abundance of iron. The stellar radius is enlarged for a G8 star, and models suggest it has evolved into a subgiant. It has 1.1 times the mass of the Sun and is spinning with a projected rotational velocity of 3 km/s.

== Planetary system ==
In 2012 a transiting gas giant planet WASP-63b was detected on a tight, circular orbit. Its equilibrium temperature is 1,536±37 K, and measured dayside temperature is 1,547±308 K. The planet is similar to Saturn in mass but is highly inflated due to proximity to the parent star. The planetary atmosphere contains water and likely has a high cloud deck of indeterminate composition.

The WASP-63 planetary system
Companion (in order from star)	Mass	Semimajor axis (AU)	Orbital period (days)	Eccentricity	Inclination (°)	Radius
b / Regoč	0.339±0.03 M_{J}	0.05417^{+0.00067}_{−0.00089}	4.3780900±0.000006	0.026^{+0.040}_{−0.029}	87.8±1.3	1.33±0.24 R_{J}
