= HD 36187 =

Star in the constellation of Columba

- Location of HD 36187 (circled)

Observation data Epoch J2000.0 Equinox ICRS
- Constellation: Columba
- Right ascension: 05^{h} 28^{m} 15.33500^{s}
- Declination: −37° 13′ 50.7477″
- Apparent magnitude (V): 5.55±0.01

Characteristics
- Evolutionary stage: main sequence star
- Spectral type: A1 V
- B−V color index: +0.02

Astrometry
Radial velocity (R_{v})	50±2 km/s
Proper motion (μ)	RA: +10.887 mas/yr Dec.: +68.709 mas/yr
Parallax (π)	11.5707±0.0576 mas
Distance	282 ± 1 ly (86.4 ± 0.4 pc)
Absolute magnitude (M_{V})	+0.84

Details
Mass	2.3^{+0.15}_{−0.12} M_{☉}
Radius	2.43±0.12 R_{☉}
Luminosity	48±2 L_{☉}
Surface gravity (log g)	4.10±0.14 cgs
Temperature	9,513±21 K
Metallicity [Fe/H]	−0.16 dex
Rotational velocity (v sin i)	145 km/s
Age	311^{+83}_{−149} Myr

Other designations
- 20 G. Columbae, CD−37°2220, CPD−37°692, GC 6774, HD 36187, HIP 25608, HR 1835, SAO 195887

Database references
SIMBAD	data

HD 36187, also known as HR 1835, is a solitary, bluish-white hued star located in the southern constellation Columba, the dove. It has an apparent magnitude of 5.55, making it faintly visible to the naked eye under ideal conditions. Based on parallax measurements from the Gaia spacecraft, it is estimated to be 282 light years away from the Solar System. However, it is receding rapidly with a heliocentric radial velocity of 50 km/s. At its current distance, HD 36187's brightness is diminished by 0.21 magnitude due to interstellar dust.

HD 36187 has a stellar classification of either A1 V or A0 V, depending on the source. Nevertheless, both classes indicate that it is an ordinary A-type main-sequence star that is fusing hydrogen in its core. It has double the mass and radius of the Sun. It radiates 48 times the luminosity of the Sun from its photosphere at an effective temperature of 9,512 K. HD 36187 is estimated to be 311 million years old, having completed 66.9% of its main sequence lifetime. Like many hot stars HR 1835 spins rapidly, having a projected rotational velocity of 145 km/s.
