= HD 46568 =

Star in the constellation of Columba

- Location of HD 46568 (circled in red)

Observation data Epoch J2000.0 Equinox ICRS
- Constellation: Columba
- Right ascension: 06^{h} 32^{m} 21.3775^{s}
- Declination: −37° 41′ 48.205″
- Apparent magnitude (V): 5.25±0.01

Characteristics
- Evolutionary stage: red giant branch
- Spectral type: G8 III
- U−B color index: +0.75
- B−V color index: +0.98

Astrometry
Radial velocity (R_{v})	39±1 km/s
Proper motion (μ)	RA: +73.075 mas/yr Dec.: −75.599 mas/yr
Parallax (π)	11.4692±0.0782 mas
Distance	284 ± 2 ly (87.2 ± 0.6 pc)
Absolute magnitude (M_{V})	+0.64

Details
Mass	1.94±0.11 M_{☉}
Radius	10.66±0.18 R_{☉}
Luminosity	60.7±1.4 L_{☉}
Surface gravity (log g)	2.69±0.07 cgs
Temperature	4,935±29 K
Metallicity [Fe/H]	−0.16±0.02 dex
Rotational velocity (v sin i)	1.2±1.2 km/s
Age	1.68 Gyr

Other designations
- 104 G. Columbae, CD−37°2889, CPD−37°964, GC 8514, HD 46568, HIP 31165, HR 2399, SAO 196917

Database references
SIMBAD	data

HD 46568 (HR 2399) is a solitary star in the southern constellation Columba. It is faintly visible to the naked eye with an apparent magnitude of 5.25. Parallax measurements place the object at a distance of 284 light years and is currently receding with a heliocentric radial velocity of 39 km/s.

HD 46568 has a stellar classification of G8 III, indicating that it is a yellow giant. At present it has nearly twice the mass of the Sun but at an age of 1.68 billion years it has expanded to 10.66 times the radius of the Sun. It has an effective temperature of 4,935 K, giving it a yellow glow. However, the star's large radius yields a luminosity 60 times that of Sun. HD 46568's metallicity is 69% that of the Sun and it spins with a poorly constrained projected rotational velocity of 1.2 km/s.
