= Nu2 Columbae =

Star in the constellation Columba

ν^{2} Columbae
- Location of ν^{2} Columbae (circled in red)

Observation data Epoch J2000.0 Equinox J2000.0 (ICRS)
- Constellation: Columba
- Right ascension: 05^{h} 37^{m} 44.618^{s}
- Declination: −28° 41′ 22.88″
- Apparent magnitude (V): 5.31

Characteristics
- Evolutionary stage: main sequence
- Spectral type: F5 V
- U−B color index: +0.10
- B−V color index: +0.46

Astrometry
Radial velocity (R_{v})	+39.07±0.14 km/s
Proper motion (μ)	RA: −37.777 mas/yr Dec.: +42.393 mas/yr
Parallax (π)	24.0801±0.0660 mas
Distance	135.4 ± 0.4 ly (41.5 ± 0.1 pc)
Absolute magnitude (M_{V})	+2.21

Details
Mass	1.64±0.04 M_{☉}
Radius	2.779±0.056 R_{☉}
Luminosity	10.80^{+0.05}_{−0.06} L_{☉}
Surface gravity (log g)	3.731^{+0.003}_{−0.005} cgs
Temperature	6,276±2 K
Metallicity [Fe/H]	−0.11±0.15 dex
Rotational velocity (v sin i)	27.2 km/s
Age	1.93±0.23 Gyr

Other designations
- ν^{2} Col, CD−28°2321, HD 37495, HIP 26460, HR 1935, SAO 170613

Database references
SIMBAD	data

Nu^{2} Columbae is a solitary star in the southern constellation of Columba. It can be seen with the naked eye, having an apparent visual magnitude of 5.31. With an annual parallax shift of 24.08 mas, it is estimated to lie at a distance of 135.4 light-years (41.5 pc) from the Sun. The star is drifting further away with a line of sight velocity component of +39 km/s.

This star has a stellar classification of F5 V, indicating that it is an F-type main sequence star that is generating energy through the thermonuclear fusion of hydrogen into helium in its core region. It has about 1.64 times the mass of the Sun and 2.8 times the Sun's radius. X-ray emission has been detected from this star, with an estimated luminosity of 1.6×10^{29} erg/s. It is about 1.9 billion years old and is spinning with a projected rotational velocity of 27.2 km/s. The star is radiating 10.8 times the luminosity of the Sun from its photosphere at an effective temperature of 6,276 K.
