= Kappa Columbae =

Star in the constellation Columba

κ Columbae
- Location of κ Columbae (circled in red)

Observation data Epoch J2000.0 Equinox J2000.0 (ICRS)
- Constellation: Columba
- Right ascension: 06^{h} 16^{m} 33.135^{s}
- Declination: −35° 08′ 25.85″
- Apparent magnitude (V): 4.37

Characteristics
- Evolutionary stage: red giant branch
- Spectral type: K0.5 IIIa or G9IIIb CN0.5
- U−B color index: +0.83
- B−V color index: +1.00
- Variable type: Suspected

Astrometry
Radial velocity (R_{v})	23.20±0.13 km/s
Proper motion (μ)	RA: +0.614 mas/yr Dec.: +87.903 mas/yr
Parallax (π)	17.3842±0.0832 mas
Distance	187.6 ± 0.9 ly (57.5 ± 0.3 pc)
Absolute magnitude (M_{V})	+0.63

Details
Mass	2.50^{+0.50}_{−0.04} M_{☉}
Radius	10.7±0.2 R_{☉}
Luminosity	60.73^{+0.55}_{−0.54} L_{☉}
Surface gravity (log g)	2.682 cgs
Temperature	4,937^{+5}_{−6} K
Metallicity [Fe/H]	+0.11 dex
Age	622^{+64}_{−253} Myr

Other designations
- κ Col, NSV 2897, CD−35°2800, FK5 238, GC 8062, HD 43785, HIP 29807, HR 2256, SAO 196643

Database references
SIMBAD	data

Kappa Columbae is a solitary star in the southern constellation of Columba. Its name is a Bayer designation that is Latinized from κ Columbae, and abbreviated Kappa Col or κ Col. It has an apparent visual magnitude of 4.37, which is bright enough to be seen with the naked eye. Based upon an annual parallax shift of 17.38 mas, it is located at a distance of 187.6 light-years (57.5 pc) from the Sun. It has a peculiar velocity of 20.2±1.9 km/s, making it a candidate runaway star.

This is an evolved K-type giant star with a stellar classification of K0.5 IIIa. At the age of 622 million years, it has 2.50 times the mass of the Sun and has expanded to 10.7 times the Sun's radius.The star radiates 60.7 times the solar luminosity from its outer atmosphere at an effective temperature of 4,937 K. It is catalogued as a suspected variable star.

In Chinese, 孫 (Sūn), meaning Grandson, refers to an asterism consisting of κ Columbae and θ Columbae. Consequently, κ Columbae itself is known as 孫一 (Sūn yī, English: the First Star of Grandson).
