= AP Columbae =

Star in the constellation Columba

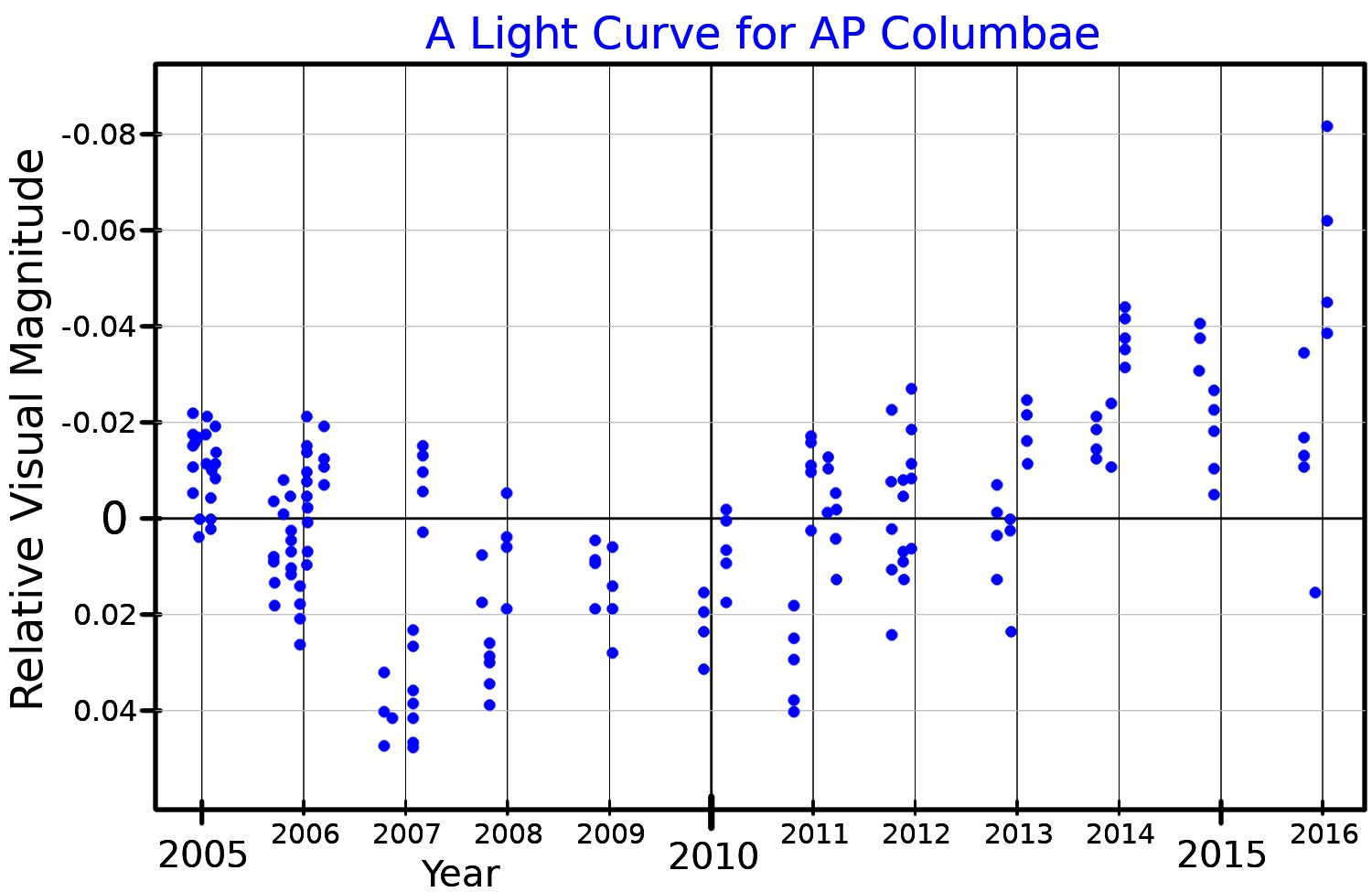
- A visual band light curve for AP Columbae, adapted from Clements et al. (2017)

Observation data Epoch J2000.0 Equinox J2000.0
- Constellation: Columba
- Right ascension: 06^{h} 04^{m} 52.14866^{s}
- Declination: −34° 33′ 35.7744″
- Apparent magnitude (V): 12.96±0.01

Characteristics
- Spectral type: M5
- V−R color index: 1.47±0.03
- R−I color index: 1.89±0.03
- Variable type: Flare star

Astrometry
Radial velocity (R_{v})	23.91±0.49 km/s
Proper motion (μ)	RA: +25.787 mas/yr Dec.: +343.018 mas/yr
Parallax (π)	115.3982±0.0298 mas
Distance	28.264 ± 0.007 ly (8.666 ± 0.002 pc)
Absolute magnitude (M_{V})	13.34

Details
Mass	0.263±0.022 M_{☉}
Radius	0.291±0.009 R_{☉}
Luminosity (visual, L_{V})	0.00641±0.00019 L_{☉}
Habitable zone inner limit	0.083 AU
Habitable zone outer limit	0.165 AU
Surface gravity (log g)	4.96 cgs
Temperature	3,035±30 K
Rotation	0.9940±0.0009 days
Rotational velocity (v sin i)	15.94±0.09 km/s
Age	130 – 200 Myr

Other designations
- 2MASS J06045215-3433360, GSC 07079-01500, LTT 2449, L 523-55

Database references
SIMBAD	data

AP Columbae is a red dwarf star in the constellation of Columba. It has about 26% the mass and 29% the radius of the Sun, but only 0.6% of its luminosity. This star is located at around 28 ly (8.7 pc) from Earth based on measurements by the Gaia spacecraft.

== Discovery ==
AP Columbae was identified as a flare star in 1995; it was discovered as a bright X-ray source in 1999 during a study of bright infra-red point sources from the 2MASS catalogue which did not have an optical counterpart—one of the reasons for an absence of a counterpart would be a large proper motion, which tends to correlate with proximity. Photometry and spectra taken during that work gave an estimate for the intrinsic brightness of the star, which let to a distance estimate of about 6.1 pc.

A later work confirmed that the star was nearby and determined that it was very young. It is at a distance of 27 light years (8.4 pc), a figure calculated by accurate observations of the star's relative movement with respect to the background stars during the course of an Earth year, the parallax. For many years, scientists believed that such young stars were present only in very distant star-forming regions like the Orion Nebula, but with the advent of new all-sky survey techniques this has proved to be incorrect.

== Features ==
The age of AP Columbae was initially estimated in 2011 at 12 to 50 million years (Myr) by calculating the amount of lithium present in the star, which is rapidly burned up once nuclear fusion ignites. Such an age would imply that AP Columbae formed after the dinosaurs became extinct and during a period when mammals were beginning to dominate the Earth. Given its estimated distance of 27 ly (8.4 pc), it would be the closest-known star less than 100 Myr old and the closest-known pre-main sequence star. However, its age was later determined to be likely between 130 and 200 million years, based on the likely membership to the AB Doradus moving group.

AP Columbae is classified as a red dwarf of the spectral class M5 with an estimated surface temperature of 3,035 K. The star is almost surely single: direct imaging indicated that any stellar companion would be less than 50 milliarcseconds distant, and the radial velocity variations induced by so close a companion would be much larger than the observed ones. It was initially suggested to be likely a member of a group of stars called Argus/IC 2391, but a kinematic analysis using Gaia EDR3 astrometry instead found it to be likely a member of the AB Doradus moving group, at 96.1% probability.

AP Columbae belongs to the class of stars known as UV Ceti flare stars. These are young low-mass stars, which are strong sources of X-ray radiation and experience frequent flares. The latter are much like Solar flares but are much brighter as compared to the star's quiescent luminosity—the brightness of AP Columbae can increase as much as 10 times during the largest flares.

Since AP Columbae is so close to the Earth, it will be possible to search for any large gas giant planets it possesses using high-resolution images of its immediate neighborhood. Such an approach would not be practical for other, more distant, young stars. Scientists hope to find newly formed planets orbiting the star from observations with the telescopes in Chile. The search for planetary companions has not found any superjovian planets beyond 4.5 AU from the star though.

== See also ==
- Habitability of red dwarf systems
- List of star systems within 25–30 light-years
- Gliese 581
- AU Microscopii
- AB Doradus
- HD 85512
