= Alpha Columbae =

Star in the constellation Columba

- Location of α Columbae (circled)

Observation data Epoch J2000 Equinox ICRS
- Constellation: Columba
- Right ascension: 05^{h} 39^{m} 38.94103^{s}
- Declination: −34° 04′ 26.7950″
- Apparent magnitude (V): 2.645

Characteristics
- Spectral type: B9Ve or B7 IV
- U−B color index: −0.44
- B−V color index: −0.125
- R−I color index: −0.09
- Variable type: γ Cas?

Astrometry
Radial velocity (R_{v})	+35.0 km/s
Proper motion (μ)	RA: −1.58 mas/yr Dec.: −24.82 mas/yr
Parallax (π)	12.48±0.36 mas
Distance	261 ± 8 ly (80 ± 2 pc)
Absolute magnitude (M_{V})	−1.87

Details
Mass	4.5 M_{☉}
Radius	7±0.14 R_{☉}
Luminosity	3,311 L_{☉}
Surface gravity (log g)	3.5±0.04 cgs
Temperature	12,200±122 K
Rotational velocity (v sin i)	176 km/s
Age	93 Myr

Other designations
- Phact, α Col, NSV 2549, CD−34 2375, CPD−34 703, FK5 215, GC 7078, HD 37795, HIP 26634, HR 1956, SAO 196059, PPM 281732, CCDM J05396−3404 A

Database references
SIMBAD	data

Alpha Columbae is a third magnitude star in the southern constellation of Columba. It has the proper name Phact (/ˈfækt/); Alpha Columbae is the Bayer designation, which is Latinized from α Columbae. This star has an apparent visual magnitude of 2.6, making it the brightest member of Columba. Based upon parallax measurements made during the Hipparcos mission, Alpha Columbae is located at a distance of around 261 light-years (80 parsecs).

== Nomenclature ==
α Columbae, Latinized to Alpha Columbae, is the star's Bayer designation. It is abbreviated Alpha Col or α Col.

The traditional name of Phact (also rendered Phad, Phaet, Phakt) derives from the Arabic فاختة fākhitah 'ring dove'. It was originally applied to the constellation Cygnus and later transferred to this star. The etymology of its name hadāri (unknown meaning) has also been suggested. In 2016, the International Astronomical Union organized a Working Group on Star Names (WGSN) to catalog and standardize proper names for stars. The WGSN's first bulletin of July 2016 included a table of the first two batches of names approved by the WGSN; which included Phact for this star.

In Chinese, 丈人 (Zhàng Rén), meaning Grandfather, refers to an asterism consisting of α Columbae and ε Columbae. Consequently, α Columbae itself is known as 丈人一 (Zhàng Rén yī, English: the First Star of Grandfather). From this Chinese name, the name Chang Jin has appeared.

== Properties ==
This is believed to be a solitary star, although it has a faint optical companion at an angular separation of 13.5 arcseconds, making it a double star. The stellar classification of Alpha Columbae is B9Ve, matching a B-type main-sequence star. The spectrum shows it to be a Be star surrounded by a hot gaseous disk, which is generating emission lines because of hydrogen recombination. Like most if not all such stars, it is rotating rapidly with a projected rotational velocity of 176 km s^{−1}. The azimuthal equatorial velocity may be 457 km s^{−1}. It is a suspected Gamma Cassiopeiae type (GCAS) variable star, with its apparent magnitude varying from 2.62^{m} to 2.66^{m}.
