= Delta Columbae =

Binary star system in the constellation Columba

δ Columbae
- Location of δ Columbae (circled in red)

Observation data Epoch J2000.0 Equinox J2000.0 (ICRS)
- Constellation: Columba
- Right ascension: 06^{h} 22^{m} 06.825^{s}
- Declination: −33° 26′ 11.04″
- Apparent magnitude (V): 3.85

Characteristics
- Spectral type: G7 II
- U−B color index: +0.52
- B−V color index: +0.88

Astrometry
Radial velocity (R_{v})	−2.6±0.9 km/s
Proper motion (μ)	RA: −22.946 mas/yr Dec.: −52.045 mas/yr
Parallax (π)	15.049±0.4455 mas
Distance	217 ± 6 ly (66 ± 2 pc)
Absolute magnitude (M_{V})	−0.32

Orbit
Period (P)	868.78 d
Semi-major axis (a)	9.02±0.52 mas
Eccentricity (e)	0.7
Inclination (i)	116.3±4.2°
Periastron epoch (T)	2419915.02 JD
Argument of periastron (ω) (secondary)	117.1°
Semi-amplitude (K_{1}) (primary)	10.6 km/s

Details

δ Col A
Mass	3.401^{+0.04}_{−0.11} M_{☉}
Radius	15.1±0.5 R_{☉}
Luminosity	128.5^{+7.5}_{−6.8} L_{☉}
Surface gravity (log g)	2.41±0.01 cgs
Temperature	5,006.0±1.5 K
Metallicity [Fe/H]	−0.04 dex
Rotational velocity (v sin i)	4.8±0.2 km/s
Age	271^{+33}_{−26} Myr

Other designations
- δ Col, CD−33°2927, HD 44762, HIP 30277, HR 2296, SAO 196735

Database references
SIMBAD	data

Delta Columbae is a binary star system in the constellation Columba. Its name is a Bayer designation that is Latinized from δ Columbae, and abbreviated Delta Col or δ Col. This system can be seen with the naked eye as a point of light, having an apparent visual magnitude of 3.85. The distance to this system, based upon an annual parallax shift of 13.94 mas, is approximately 217 light-years (66 pc).

Delta Columbae was a latter designation of 3 Canis Majoris, as the early astronomers Johann Bayer and John Flamsteed did not include the constellation Columba in their star charts.

This is a single-lined spectroscopic binary system with an orbital period of 868.78 days and an eccentricity of 0.7. It has a peculiar velocity of 30.2±3.9 km/s, making it a candidate runaway star system. The primary component is a G-type bright giant star with a stellar classification of G7 II. At an age of 271 million years, it has 3.4 times the mass of the Sun and has expanded to 15 times the Sun's radius. The star radiates around 129 times the solar luminosity from its photosphere at an effective temperature of 5,006 K.
