= Pi2 Columbae =

Star in the constellation Columba

Pi^{2} Columbae
Observation data Epoch J2000.0 Equinox J2000.0 (ICRS)
- Constellation: Columba
- Right ascension: 06^{h} 07^{m} 52.860^{s}
- Declination: −42° 09′ 14.55″
- Apparent magnitude (V): 5.50

Characteristics
- Evolutionary stage: main sequence
- Spectral type: A0 V + A
- B−V color index: +0.00

Astrometry
Radial velocity (R_{v})	+31.0±3.7 km/s
Proper motion (μ)	RA: −10.221 mas/yr Dec.: −16.956 mas/yr
Parallax (π)	12.7569±0.0522 mas
Distance	256 ± 1 ly (78.4 ± 0.3 pc)
Absolute magnitude (M_{V})	+1.17

Details
Mass	2.34±0.04 M_{☉}
Radius	2.23±0.05 R_{☉}
Luminosity	38.7±0.6 L_{☉}
Surface gravity (log g)	4.064±0.005 cgs
Temperature	9,646±46 K
Rotational velocity (v sin i)	274 km/s
Age	370±79 Myr

Other designations
- π^{2} Col, CD−42°2351, GC 7816, HD 42303, HIP 29064, HR 2181, SAO 217730, WDS J06079-4209AB

Database references
SIMBAD	data

Pi^{2} Columbae is a multiple star system in the southern constellation of Columba, near the southern constellation border with Pictor. Its name is a Bayer designation that is Latinized from π^{2} Columbae, and abbreviated Pi^{2} Col or π^{2} Col. This system is white-hued and dimly visible to the naked eye as a point of light with a combined apparent visual magnitude of 5.50. Based upon an annual parallax shift of 12.76 mas as seen from Earth, this system is located about 256 ly (78 pc) from the Sun. They are receding with a heliocentric radial velocity of +31 km/s.

The primary star is an A-type main-sequence star of spectral class A0 V, an estimated 370 million years old and spinning rapidly with a projected rotational velocity of 274 km/s. It has 2.34 times the mass of the Sun and 2.23 times the Sun's radius. The star is radiating 38.7 times the luminosity of the Sun from its photosphere at an effective temperature of 9,646 K.

The system is a source of X-ray emission with a luminosity of 184.3×10^{20} W, which is considered unusual since A-type stars are not expected to display magnetic activity. An A-class companion has been reported at an angular separation of 0.1 arc seconds. The existence of this star has been disputed by other authors.

There are additional possible companions: a 15th-magnitude star 6.6″ away; and a 20th-magnitude star 103″ away. These have a common proper motion although they are too far from the primary for any possible orbital motion to be detected. They are estimated to have masses of 0.48 M_{☉} and 0.12 M_{☉} respectively.
