= Gamma Columbae =

Star in the constellation Columba

γ Columbae
- Location of γ Columbae (circled in red)

Observation data Epoch J2000.0 Equinox J2000.0 (ICRS)
- Constellation: Columba
- Right ascension: 05^{h} 57^{m} 32.210^{s}
- Declination: −35° 16′ 59.81″
- Apparent magnitude (V): 4.366 + 12.664

Characteristics
- Spectral type: B2.5 IV + G8 V
- U−B color index: −0.66
- B−V color index: −0.18
- Variable type: Candidate SPB

Astrometry
Radial velocity (R_{v})	+24.2±0.7 km/s
Proper motion (μ)	RA: −2.652 mas/yr Dec.: +10.218 mas/yr
Parallax (π)	3.0918±0.1241 mas
Distance	1,050 ± 40 ly (320 ± 10 pc)
Absolute magnitude (M_{V})	−2.76

Details

γ Col A
Mass	5.7±0.3 M_{☉}
Radius	4.8±0.4 R_{☉}
Luminosity	2,070 L_{☉}
Surface gravity (log g)	3.328±0.100 cgs
Temperature	15570±320 K
Rotational velocity (v sin i)	96±16 km/s
Age	23.6±2.0 Myr

γ Col B
Mass	0.94 M_{☉}
Temperature	5,367 K

Other designations
- γ Col, CD−35°2612, HD 40494, HIP 28199, HR 2106, SAO 196352

Database references
SIMBAD	data

Gamma Columbae is a possible wide binary star system in the southern constellation of Columba. Its name is a Bayer designation that is Latinized from γ Columbae, and abbreviated Gamma Col or γ Col. This system is visible to the naked eye as a point of light with an apparent visual magnitude of 4.36. Based upon an annual parallax shift of 3.09 mas, it is located at a distance of roughly 1,050 light-years (320 pc) from the Sun. The system is drifting further away with a line of ight velocity component of +24 km/s.

The primary component is an evolved B-type subgiant star with a stellar classification of B2.5 IV. It is a candidate slowly pulsating B-type star with a mean longitudinal magnetic field strength of 94±28 G. The star has nearly six times the mass of the Sun and close to five times the Sun's girth. It is radiating over 2,000 times the solar luminosity from its outer atmosphere at an effective temperature of 12,904 K. The star has a high rate of spin, showing a projected rotational velocity of around 96 km/s.

The estimated age of this star is around 24 million years. At this age, it is thought to be the remnant of a once more massive star that just finished hydrogen fusion, and is undergoing structural readjustment. This process is extremely short, on the order of ten thousand years, making it a rare object.

The visual magnitude 12.664 co-moving companion is a G-type main sequence star with a classification of G8 V. It lies at an angular separation of 33.8 arc seconds from the primary, which corresponds to a projected physical separation of 8,844 AU. Despite the young age of these stars, there has been no X-ray emission detected.
