= Pi1 Columbae =

Star in the constellation Columba

Pi^{1} Columbae
- Location of π^{1} Columbae (circled in red)

Observation data Epoch J2000.0 Equinox J2000.0 (ICRS)
- Constellation: Columba
- Right ascension: 06^{h} 06^{m} 41.03304^{s}
- Declination: −42° 17′ 55.585″
- Apparent magnitude (V): 6.13

Characteristics
- Evolutionary stage: main sequence
- Spectral type: A2mA5-A9
- U−B color index: +0.11
- B−V color index: +0.25

Astrometry
Radial velocity (R_{v})	6.56±0.78 km/s
Proper motion (μ)	RA: −26.957 mas/yr Dec.: −5.880 mas/yr
Parallax (π)	11.6365±0.1653 mas
Distance	280 ± 4 ly (86 ± 1 pc)
Absolute magnitude (M_{V})	+1.55

Details
Mass	1.75 M_{☉}
Radius	2.49+0.15 −0.11 R_{☉}
Luminosity	20.237+0.23 −0.33 L_{☉}
Surface gravity (log g)	3.85 cgs
Temperature	7,765+171 −228 K
Rotational velocity (v sin i)	70 km/s
Age	1.1 Gyr

Other designations
- π^{1} Col, CPD−42°2343, GC 7785, HD 42078, HIP 28957, HR 2171, SAO 217720

Database references
SIMBAD	data

Pi^{1} Columbae is a star in the southern constellation of Columba. Its name is a Bayer designation that is Latinized from π^{1} Columbae, and abbreviated Pi^{1} Col or π^{1} Col. With an apparent visual magnitude of 6.13, it is a dim, white-hued star that is near the limit of visibility for the naked eye. It is located at a distance of approximately 280 light-years (86 pc) from the Sun based on parallax, and has an absolute magnitude of +1.55.

This is an Am star with a stellar classification of A2mA5-A9, which means it is a chemically peculiar star that displays strong absorption lines of higher mass elements in its spectrum. At an estimated age of 1.1 billion years, this star is spinning with a projected rotational velocity of 70 km/s. It has 1.75 times the mass of the Sun and 2.5 times the Sun's radius. The star is radiating 20 times the luminosity of the Sun from its photosphere at an effective temperature of 7,765 K.

A 2024 study of stellar pulsation in Am and Fm stars suggested that π^{1} Col is a Gamma Doradus variable.
