= Nu1 Columbae =

Star in the constellation Columba

ν^{1} Columbae
Observation data Epoch J2000.0 Equinox J2000.0 (ICRS)
- Constellation: Columba
- Right ascension: 05^{h} 37^{m} 16.5030^{s}
- Declination: −27° 52′ 17.235″
- Apparent magnitude (V): 6.14

Characteristics
- Evolutionary stage: main sequence
- Spectral type: F0 IV
- B−V color index: +0.34

Astrometry
Radial velocity (R_{v})	26.7±2.0 km/s
Proper motion (μ)	RA: −3.738 mas/yr Dec.: −32.790 mas/yr
Parallax (π)	23.0790±0.1619 mas
Distance	141.3 ± 1.0 ly (43.3 ± 0.3 pc)
Absolute magnitude (M_{V})	+3.18

Details
Mass	1.41 M_{☉}
Radius	1.57 R_{☉}
Luminosity	5.4 L_{☉}
Surface gravity (log g)	4.01±0.14 cgs
Temperature	7,079±241 K
Metallicity [Fe/H]	−0.22 dex
Rotational velocity (v sin i)	161 km/s
Age	641 Myr

Other designations
- ν^{1} Col, CD−27°2389, HD 37430, HIP 26412, HR 1926, SAO 170601

Database references
SIMBAD	data

Nu^{1} Columbae is a star in the southern constellation of Columba. Its name is a Bayer designation that is Latinized from ν^{1} Columbae, and abbreviated Nu^{1} Col or ν^{1} Col. This star is visible to the naked eye, having an apparent visual magnitude of 6.14. According to the Bortle scale, stars with this magnitude are faintly visible from dark rural skies. Based upon an annual parallax shift of 23.08 mas, this star is about 128 light years distant from the Sun.

This star has a stellar classification of F0 IV, suggesting it is an evolving F-type subgiant star. However, models indicate that it is a main sequence star with an estimated age of 641 million years and a mass 1.41 times that of the Sun. The star is spinning relatively rapidly, with a projected rotational velocity of 161 km/s. It is radiating around 5.4 times the solar luminosity from its outer atmosphere at an effective temperature of 7,079 K.

There is a faint star 2.6″ away with a similar parallax, but it is not mentioned in any of the standard catalogues of multiple stars.
