= Epsilon Columbae =

Star in the constellation Columba

ε Columbae
- Location of ε Columbae (circled in red)

Observation data Epoch J2000.0 Equinox J2000.0 (ICRS)
- Constellation: Columba
- Right ascension: 05^{h} 31^{m} 12.747^{s}
- Declination: −35° 28′ 13.82″
- Apparent magnitude (V): 3.87

Characteristics
- Spectral type: K1 II/III or K1 IIIa
- U−B color index: +1.08
- B−V color index: +1.14

Astrometry
Radial velocity (R_{v})	−4.9±0.7 km/s
Proper motion (μ)	RA: +27.627 mas/yr Dec.: −32.416 mas/yr
Parallax (π)	11.7300±0.1374 mas
Distance	278 ± 3 ly (85.3 ± 1.0 pc)
Absolute magnitude (M_{V})	−0.67

Details
Mass	2.47 M_{☉}
Radius	25.2+3.1 −2.0 R_{☉}
Luminosity	251.2±5.6 L_{☉}
Surface gravity (log g)	1.76±0.10 cgs
Temperature	4,573±50 K
Metallicity [Fe/H]	−0.07±0.10 dex
Age	1.53 Gyr

Other designations
- ε Col, CD−35°2348, FK5 2413, HD 36597, HIP 25859, HR 1862, SAO 195924

Database references
SIMBAD	data

Epsilon Columbae is a star in the southern constellation of Columba. Its name is a Bayer designation that is Latinized from ε Columbae, and abbreviated Epsilon Col or ε Col. This star is visible to the naked eye, having an apparent visual magnitude of 3.87. Based upon an annual parallax shift of 11.73 mas, it is located approximately 278 light-years (85.3 pc) distant from the Sun. The star is drifting closer with a radial velocity of −5 km/s.

This is an orange-hued K-type giant star with a stellar classification of K1 II/III. At the age of 1.5 billion years old, it has exhausted the supply of hydrogen at its core then cooled and expanded off the main sequence. Epsilon Columbae has 2.5 times the mass and 25 times the radius of the Sun. The star radiates 251 times the solar luminosity from its enlarged photosphere at an effective temperature of 4,575 K. It has a peculiar velocity of 30.0±3.9 km/s, making it a candidate runaway star system. Based upon changes in the star's movement, it has an orbiting stellar companion of unknown type.
