= Mu Columbae =

Star in the constellation Columba

μ Columbae
- Location of μ Columbae (circled)

Observation data Epoch J2000 Equinox J2000
- Constellation: Columba
- Right ascension: 05^{h} 45^{m} 59.895^{s}
- Declination: −32° 18′ 23.16″
- Apparent magnitude (V): 5.18

Characteristics
- Evolutionary stage: main sequence
- Spectral type: O9.5 V
- U−B color index: −1.06
- B−V color index: −0.28
- Variable type: Suspected

Astrometry
Radial velocity (R_{v})	+109.00±1.8 km/s
Proper motion (μ)	RA: +3.271 mas/yr Dec.: −22.176 mas/yr
Parallax (π)	1.7024±0.0898 mas
Distance	1,890±110 ly (581±34 pc)
Absolute magnitude (M_{V})	−3.78±0.11

Details
Mass	18.9±0.3 M_{☉}
Radius	6.3±0.4 R_{☉}
Luminosity	43,650+4,210 −3,840 L_{☉}
Surface gravity (log g)	4.12±0.05 cgs
Temperature	33,400±300 K
Rotational velocity (v sin i)	125±8 km/s
Age	2 – 4 Myr

Other designations
- μ Col, CD−`32°2538, HD 38666, HIP 27204, HR 1996, SAO 196149

Database references
SIMBAD	data

Mu Columbae is a star in the constellation of Columba. Its name is a Bayer designation that is Latinized from μ Columbae, and abbreviated Mu Col or μ Col. This is one of the few O-class stars that are visible to the unaided eye. The star is known to lie approximately 1,900 light years from the Solar System (with an error margin of a few hundred light years).

Based on measurements of proper motion and radial velocity, astronomers know that this star and AE Aurigae are moving away from each other at a relative velocity of over 200 km/s. Their common point of origin intersects with Iota Orionis in the Trapezium cluster, some two and half million years in the past. The most likely scenario that could have created these runaway stars is a collision between two binary star systems, with the stars being ejected along different trajectories radial to the point of intersection.

Mu Columbae has a stellar classification of O9.5 V, presenting as a massive O-type main-sequence star. It has 19 times the mass of the Sun and 6 times the Sun's radius. At an estimated age of 2–4 million years, it is spinning with a projected rotational velocity of around 125 km/s. This is a relatively fast rotating star that completes a full revolution approximately every 1.5 days. (Compare this to the Sun, which at only 22 percent of this star's diameter rotates only once every 25.4 days.) This rate of rotation is fairly typical for stars of this class. Mu Columbae is radiating around 44,000 times the luminosity of the Sun from its photosphere at an effective temperature of 33,400 K.

== Etymology ==
In Chinese astronomy, Mu Columbae is called 屎, Pinyin: Shǐ, meaning "Excrement" or "The Secretions", because this star is marking itself and stand alone in the asterism of the same name within the Three Stars mansion.
