= Columba (constellation) =

Constellation in the southern celestial hemisphere

- Constellation
- List of stars in Columba
- Abbreviation: Col
- Genitive: Columbae
- Pronunciation: /kəˈlʌmbə/, genitive /kəˈlʌmbiː/
- Symbolism: the dove
- Right ascension: 05^{h} 03^{m} 53.8665^{s}–06^{h} 39^{m} 36.9263^{s}
- Declination: −27.0772038°–−43.1116486°
- Area: 270 sq. deg. (54th)
- Main stars: 5
- Bayer/Flamsteed stars: 18
- Stars brighter than 3.00^{m}: 1
- Stars within 10.00 pc (32.62 ly): 2
- Brightest star: α Col (Phact) (2.65^{m})
- Nearest star: AP Col
- Messier objects: 0
- Meteor showers: 0
- Bordering constellations: Lepus; Caelum; Pictor; Puppis; Canis Major
- Visible at latitudes between +45° and −90°. Best visible at 21:00 (9 p.m.) during the month of January.

Columba is a faint constellation designated in the late sixteenth century, remaining in official use, with its rigid limits set in the 20th century. Its name is Latin for dove. It takes up 1.31% of the southern celestial hemisphere and is just south of Canis Major and Lepus.

== History ==
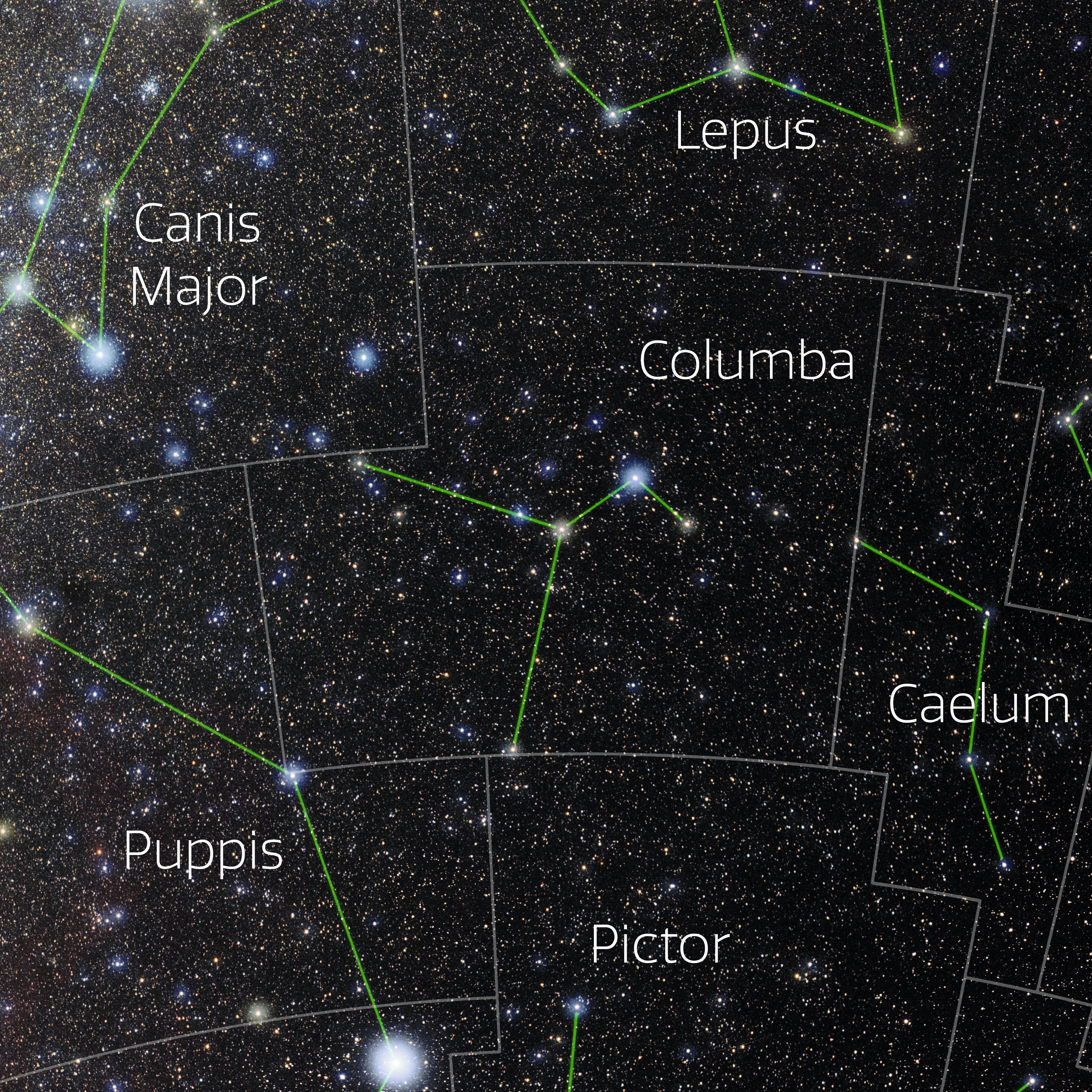
The constellation Columba showing the IAU boundaries, the constellation stick figure, and labels for its brightest stars. Astrophotograph by Eckhard Slawik, from NOIRLab's 88 Constellations project.

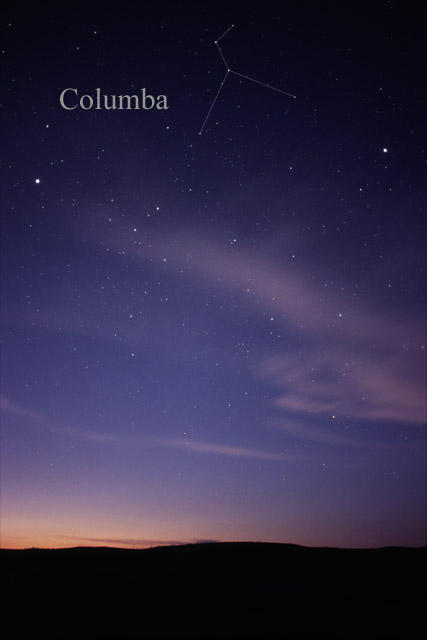
The constellation Columba as it can be seen by the naked eye.

- Early 3rd century BC: Aratus's astronomical poem Phainomena (lines 367–370 and 384–385) mentions faint stars where Columba is now but does not fit any name or figure to them.
- 2nd century AD: Ptolemy lists 48 constellations in the Almagest. While Columba is not yet among them, several stars south of Canis Major listed in this work will eventually become part of Columba.
- c. 150–215 AD: Clement of Alexandria wrote in his Logos Paidogogos"Αἱ δὲ σφραγῖδες ἡμῖν ἔστων πελειὰς ἢ ἰχθὺς ἢ ναῦς οὐριοδρομοῦσα ἢ λύρα μουσική, ᾗ κέχρηται Πολυκράτης, ἢ ἄγκυρα ναυτική," (= "[when recommending symbols for Christians to use], let our seals be a dove or a fish or a ship running in a good wind or a musical lyre ... or a ship's anchor ..."), with no mention of stars or astronomy.
- 1592 AD: Petrus Plancius first depicted Columba on the small celestial planispheres of his large wall map to differentiate the 'unformed stars' of the large constellation Canis Major. Columba is also shown on his smaller world map of 1594 and on early Dutch celestial globes. Plancius named the constellation Columba Noachi ("Noah's Dove"), referring to the dove that gave Noah the information that the Great Flood was receding. This name is found on early 17th-century celestial globes and star atlases.

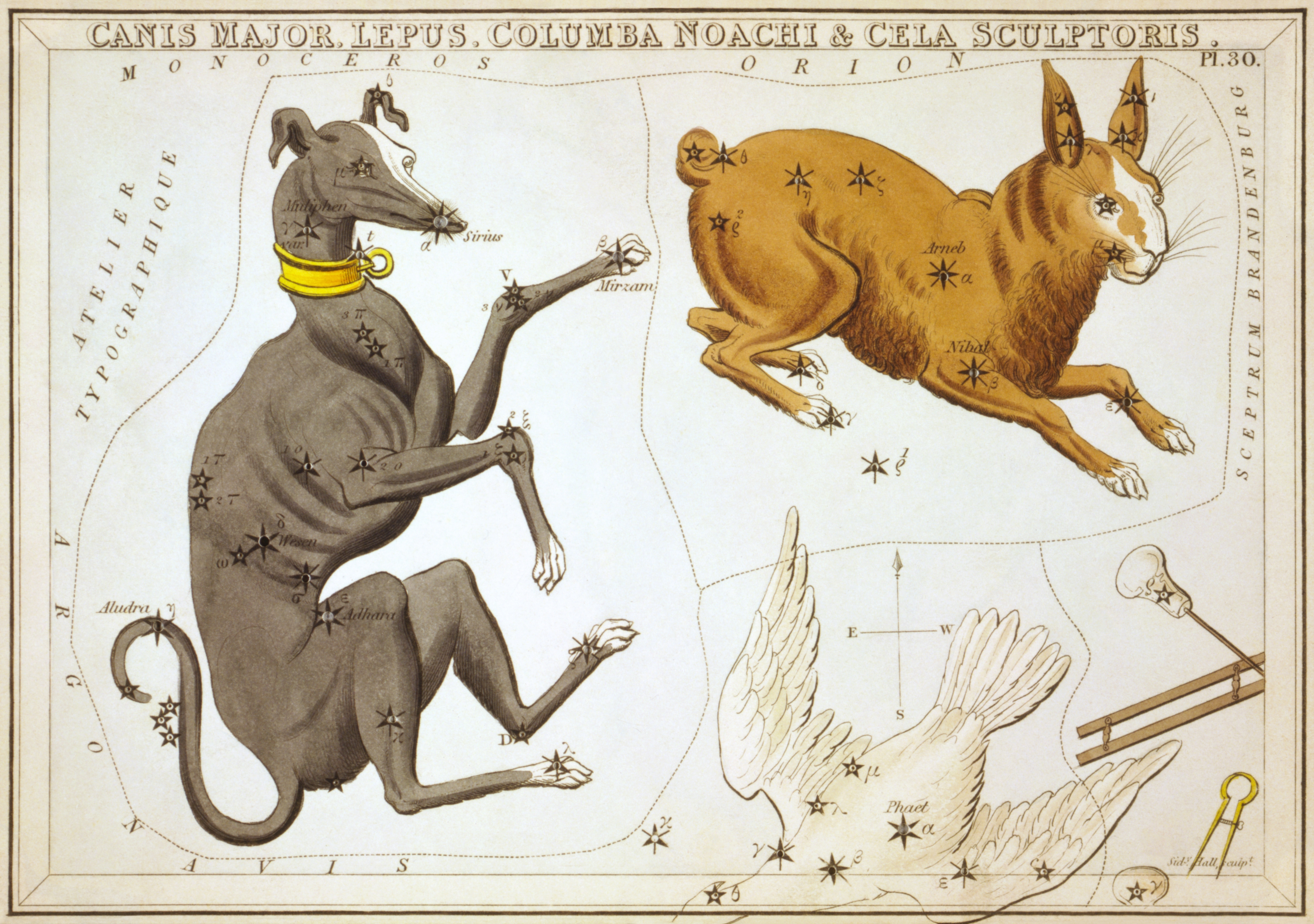
The constellation seen as "Columba Noachi" in Urania's Mirror (1825).

- 1603: Frederick de Houtman listed Columba as "De Duyve met den Olijftack" ("the dove with the olive branch")
- 1603: Bayer's sky atlas Uranometria was published. It includes Columba as Columba Noachi.
- 1624: Bartschius listed Columba in his Usus Astronomicus as "Columba Nohae".
- 1662: Caesius published Coelum Astronomico-Poeticum, including an inaccurate Latin translation of the above text of Clement of Alexandria: it mistranslated "ναῦς οὐριοδρομοῦσα" as Latin "Navis coelestis cursu in coelum tendens" ("Ship of the sky following a course in the sky"), perhaps misunderstanding "οὐριο-" as "up in the air or sky" by analogy with οὐρανός = "sky".
- 1679: Halley mentioned Columba in his work Catalogus Stellarum Australium from his observations on St. Helena.
- 1679: Augustin Royer published a star atlas that showed Columba as a constellation.
- c.1690: Hevelius's Prodromus Astronomiae showed Columba but did not list it as a constellation.
- 1712 (pirated) and 1725 (authorized): Flamsteed's work Historia Coelestis Britannica showed Columba but did not list it as a constellation.
- 1757 or 1763: Lacaille listed Columba as a constellation and catalogued its stars.
- 1889: Richard H. Allen, misled by Caesius's mistranslation, wrote that the Columba asterism may have been invented in Roman/Greek times, but with a footnote saying that it may have been another star group.
- 2019: OSIRIS-REx students discovered a black hole in the constellation Columba, based on observing X-ray bursts.

== Features ==
=== Stars ===
Lacaille gave 17 stars Bayer designations Alpha through Sigma in 1756, but omitted Zeta, Iota, and Xi, and labelled two stars as Nu and Pi. Francis Baily included Rho Columbae in Puppis and the designation is no longer used. In 1879, Benjamin Gould added Xi Columbae as he felt the star was bright enough to warrant a name.

Columba is rather inconspicuous with the brightest star, Alpha Columbae, being only of magnitude 2.7. This, a blue-white star, has a pre-Bayer, traditional, Arabic name Phact (meaning ring dove) and is 268 light-years from Earth. The only other named star is Beta Columbae, which has the alike-status name Wazn. It is an orange-hued giant star of magnitude 3.1, 87 light-years away. The constellation contains the runaway star μ Columbae. Exoplanet NGTS-1b and its star NGTS-1 are in Columba.

=== General radial velocity ===
Columba contains the solar antapex – the opposite to the net direction of the Solar System.

=== Deep-sky objects ===
The globular cluster NGC 1851 appears in Columba at 7th magnitude in a far part of our galaxy at 39,000 light-years away - it is resolvable south of at greatest latitude +40°N in medium-sized amateur telescopes (under good conditions).

== See also ==
- Columba (Chinese astronomy)
- IAU-recognized constellations
