= NGC 3278 =

Galaxy in the constellation Antlia

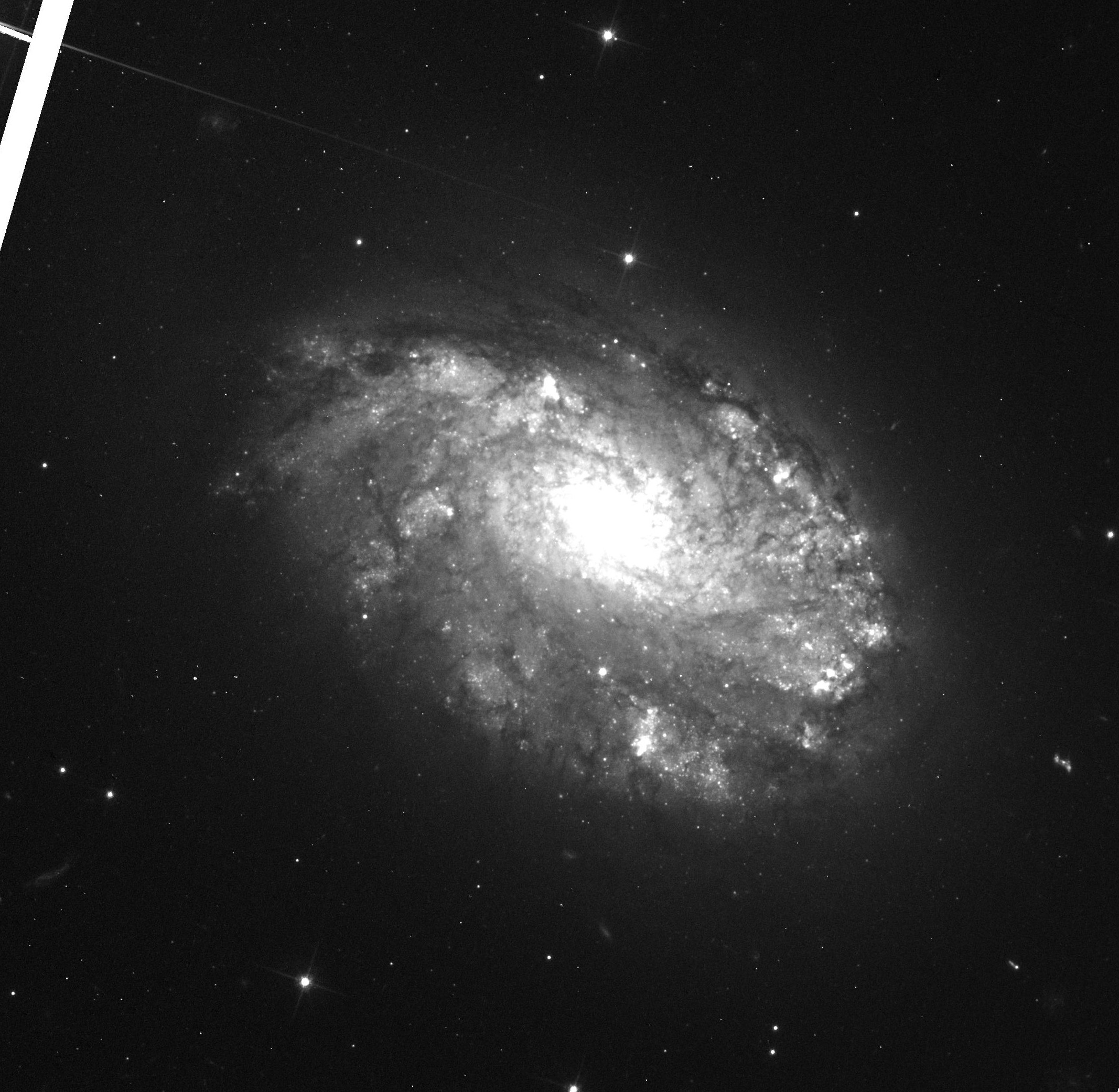
- NGC 3278 imaged by the Hubble Space Telescope

Observation data (J2000 epoch)
- Constellation: Antlia
- Right ascension: 10^{h} 31^{m} 35.4845^{s}
- Declination: −39° 57′ 15.960″
- Redshift: 0.009877±0.000123
- Heliocentric radial velocity: 2,961±37 km/s
- Distance: 129.40 ± 1.29 Mly (39.675 ± 0.394 Mpc)
- Group or cluster: LDC 725 group
- Apparent magnitude (V): 13.01

Characteristics
- Type: SA(s)c
- Size: ~65,700 ly (20.14 kpc) (estimated)
- Apparent size (V): 1.3′ × 0.9′

Other designations
- ESO 317- G 043, IRAS 10293-3941, 2MASX J10313538-3957166, MCG -07-22-021, PGC 31068

NGC 3278 is a spiral galaxy in the constellation of Antlia. Its velocity with respect to the cosmic microwave background is 3,268±43 km/s, which corresponds to a Hubble distance of 157.2 ± 11.3 Mly (48.20 ± 3.47 Mpc). However, four non-redshift measurements give a closer mean distance of 129.40 ± 1.29 Mly (39.675 ± 0.394 Mpc). It was discovered by British astronomer John Herschel on 2 March 1835.

NGC 3278 has a possible active galactic nucleus, i.e. it has a compact region at the center of a galaxy that emits a significant amount of energy across the electromagnetic spectrum, with characteristics indicating that this luminosity is not produced by the stars.

== LDC 725 group ==
NGC 3278 is a member of a group of galaxies known as LDC 725. This group contains 28 galaxies, including NGC 3244, NGC 3250, NGC 3256, NGC 3261, NGC 3262, NGC 3263, and NGC 3283, among others.

== Supernova ==
One supernova has been observed in NGC 3278:

- SN 2009bb (Type Ic, mag. 17.0) was discovered by The CHilean Automatic Supernova sEarch (CHASE) on 21 March 2009.

== See also ==
- List of NGC objects (3001–4000)
