= Zeta Antliae =

The Bayer designation Zeta Antliae (ζ Ant, ζ Antliae) is shared by two star systems in the constellation Antlia:

- ζ^{1} Antliae (HD 82383/82384)
- ζ^{2} Antliae (HD 82513)

They are separated by 0.06° on the sky.
