= NGC 3125 =

Galaxy in the constellation Antlia

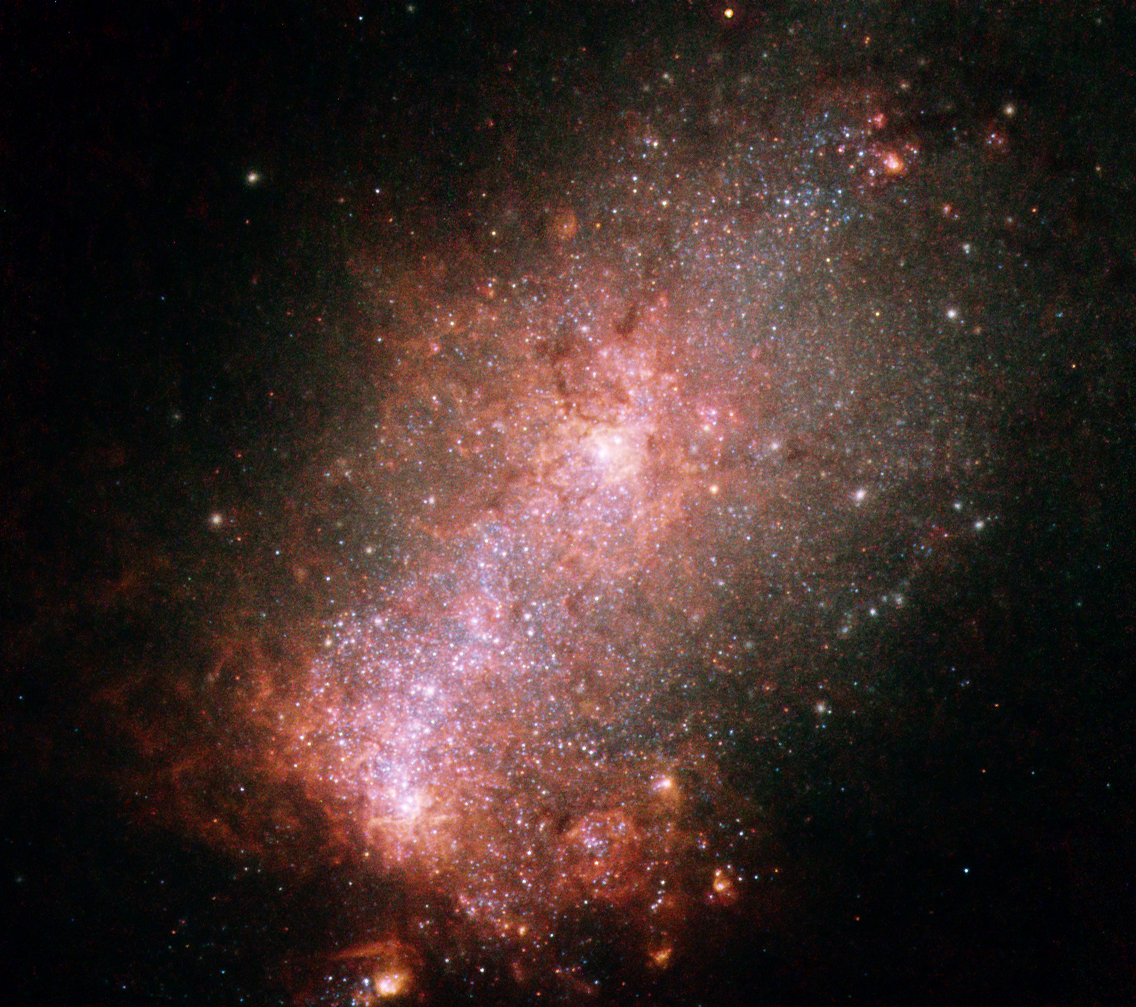

Observation data (J2000 epoch)
- Constellation: Antlia
- Right ascension: 10h 06m 33s
- Declination: -29° 56’ 05”
- Redshift: 0.003712 ± 0.000023
- Heliocentric radial velocity: 1113 ± 7 km/s
- Apparent magnitude (B): 13.45
- Surface brightness: 22.63 mag/arcsec2

Characteristics
- Type: S;BCDG
- Apparent size (V): 1.1′ × 0.7′

Other designations
- ESO 435-G041, AM 1004-294, MCG -05-24-022

NGC 3125 is an irregular dwarf starburst galaxy in the constellation Antlia that was discovered by John Herschel in 1835. It is located approximately 38 million light-years away from Earth. Starburst galaxies are galaxies in which unusually high numbers of new stars are forming, springing to life within intensely hot clouds of gas.

== Morphology ==
In a 2006 study, the two giant H II regions in the galaxy were confirmed to each host two young star clusters. The brightest cluster, NGC 3125-A1 is a confirmed super star cluster with 170,000 solar masses that likely contains some of the most massive stars every found.

== Nearby galaxies ==
NGC 3125 is member of the LGG 189 Group, which also includes the galaxies NGC 3113, NGC 3137, and NGC 3175.

== See also ==
- List of NGC objects (3001–4000)
- Star formation
