= NGC 3087 =

Galaxy in the constellation Antlia

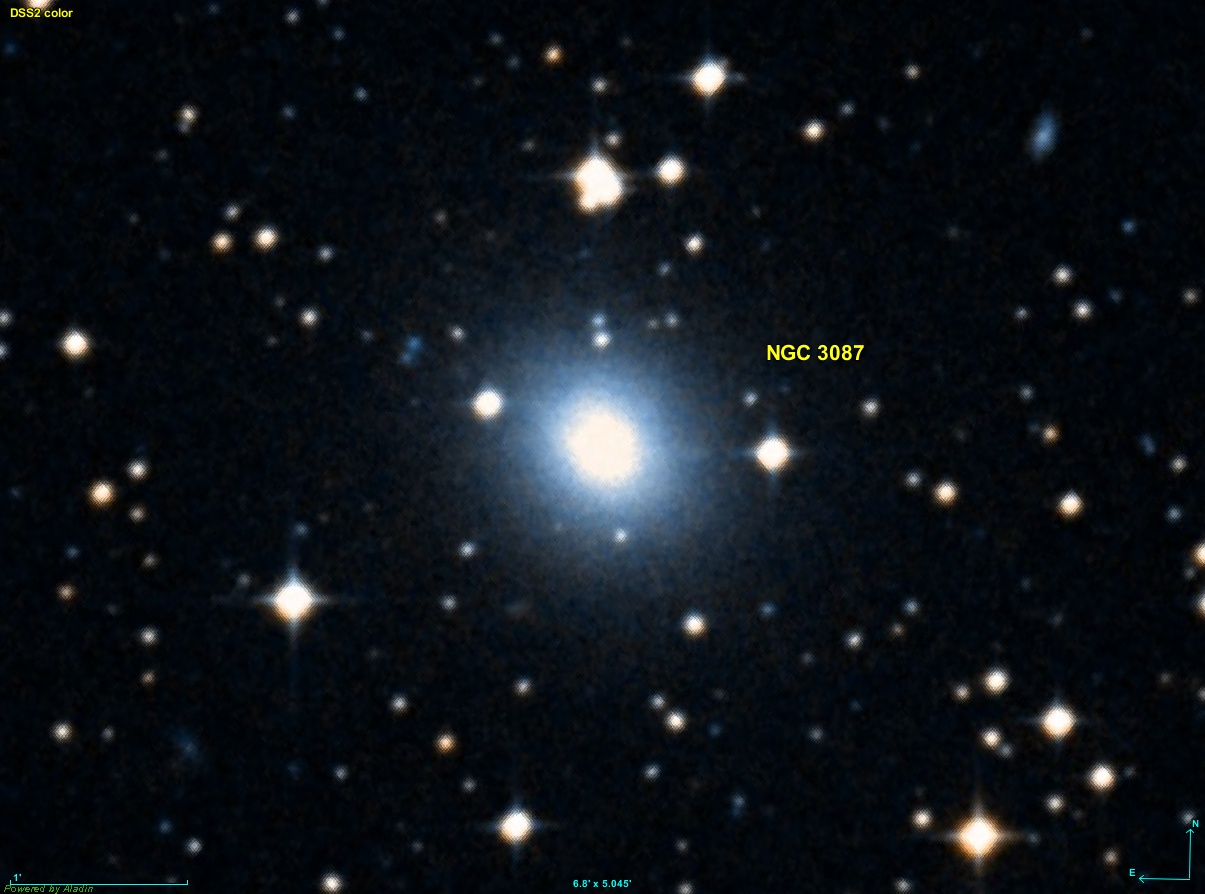
- NGC 3087 imaged by DSS

Observation data (J2000 epoch)
- Constellation: Antlia
- Right ascension: 09^{h} 59^{m} 08.6615^{s}
- Declination: −34° 13′ 30.838″
- Redshift: 0.008913
- Heliocentric radial velocity: 2672 ± 21 km/s
- Distance: 143.7 ± 10.2 Mly (44.05 ± 3.13 Mpc)
- Group or cluster: NGC 3038 Group (LGG 184)
- Apparent magnitude (V): 10.5

Characteristics
- Type: cD:
- Size: ~114,100 ly (34.99 kpc) (estimated)
- Apparent size (V): 2.0′ × 2.0′

Other designations
- 2MASX J09590864-3413307, MCG -06-22-005, PGC 28845, ESO 374- G 015

NGC 3087 is an elliptical galaxy in the constellation of Antlia. Its velocity with respect to the cosmic microwave background is 2987 ± 30 km/s, which corresponds to a Hubble distance of 44.05 ± 3.13 Mpc (~144 million light-years). It was discovered by British astronomer John Herschel on 2 February 1835.

== NGC 3038 Group ==
According to A. M. Garcia, NGC 3087 is part of the six member NGC 3038 Group (also known as LGG 184). The other five galaxies are NGC 3038, NGC 3120, IC 2532, ESO 373-21, and ESO 373-26.

== Supernova ==
One supernova has been observed in NGC 3087: SN 2023mdv (Type Ia, mag. 18.323) was discovered by ATLAS on 29 June 2023.

== See also ==
- List of NGC objects (3001–4000)
