= NGC 3241 =

Galaxy in the constellation Triangulum

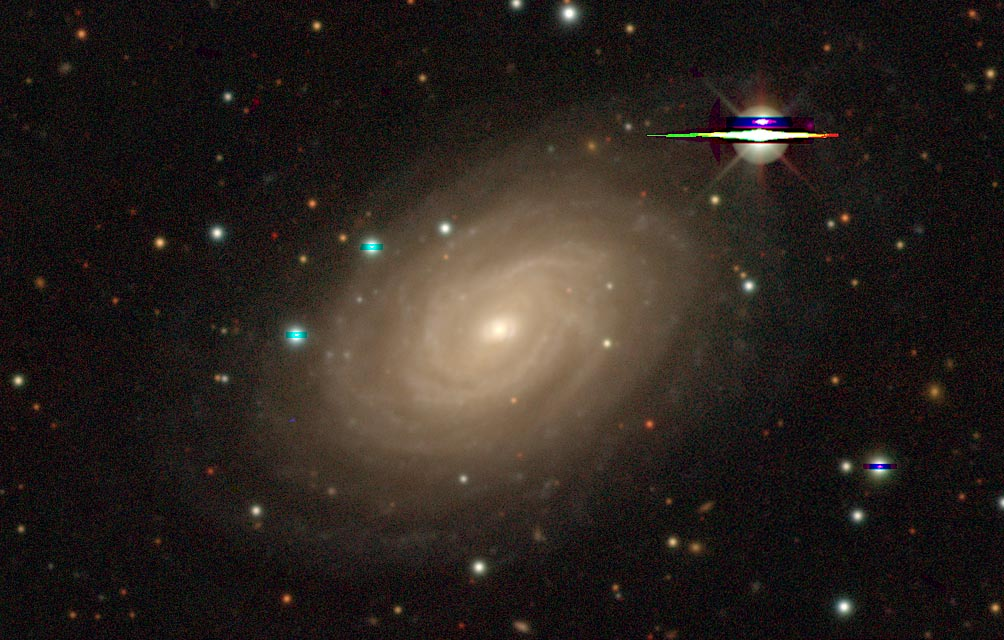
- NGC 3241 imaged by Legacy Surveys

Observation data (J2000 epoch)
- Constellation: Antlia
- Right ascension: 10^{h} 24^{m} 16.9527^{s}
- Declination: −32° 28′ 57.830″
- Redshift: 0.010070±0.0000130
- Heliocentric radial velocity: 3,019±4 km/s
- Distance: 135.97 ± 9.83 Mly (41.688 ± 3.015 Mpc)
- Group or cluster: LDC 729
- Apparent magnitude (V): 13.06

Characteristics
- Type: SA(r)ab
- Size: ~133,000 ly (40.79 kpc) (estimated)
- Apparent size (V): 2.2′ × 1.5′

Other designations
- ESO 436- G 016, IRAS 10220-3213, 2MASX J10241695-3228574, MCG -05-25-002, PGC 30498

NGC 3241 is a spiral galaxy in the constellation of Antlia. Its velocity with respect to the cosmic microwave background is 3,347±23 km/s, which corresponds to a Hubble distance of 161.0 ± 11.3 Mly (49.37 ± 3.47 Mpc). However, eight non-redshift measurements give a closer mean distance of 135.97 ± 9.83 Mly (41.688 ± 3.015 Mpc). It was discovered by British astronomer John Herschel on 16 February 1836.

NGC 3241 has a possible active galactic nucleus, i.e. it has a compact region at the center of its galaxy that emits a significant amount of energy across the electromagnetic spectrum, with characteristics indicating that this luminosity is not produced by the stars.

== LDC 729 group ==
NGC 3241 is a member of a galaxy group known as LDC 729. This group contains 210 galaxies, including 72 from the New General Catalogue and 26 from the Index Catalogue.

== Supernovae ==
Two supernovae have been observed in NGC 3241.

- SN 2008ef (type unknown, mag. 18.0) was discovered by Berto Monard on 7 July 2008.
- SN 2026vhn (Type II-P, mag. 16.948) was discovered by ATLAS on 20 July 2026.

== See also ==
- List of NGC objects (3001–4000)
