= NGC 3120 =

Galaxy in the constellation Antlia

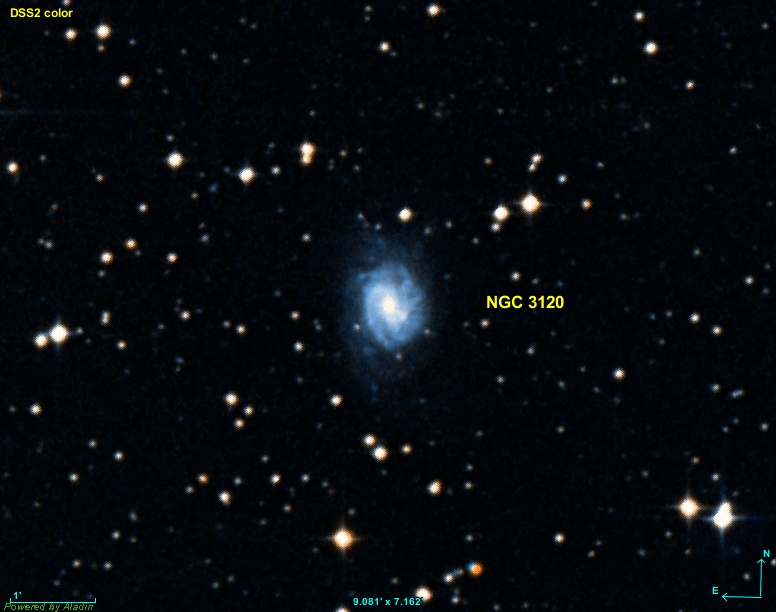
- NGC 3120 imaged by DSS

Observation data (J2000 epoch)
- Constellation: Antlia
- Right ascension: 10^{h} 05^{m} 23.0413^{s}
- Declination: −34° 13′ 11.847″
- Redshift: 0.009300±0.00000500
- Heliocentric radial velocity: 2,788±1 km/s
- Distance: 97.19 ± 5.92 Mly (29.800 ± 1.816 Mpc)
- Group or cluster: NGC 3038 Group (LGG 184)
- Apparent magnitude (V): 13.52

Characteristics
- Type: SAB(s)bc
- Size: ~79,200 ly (24.27 kpc) (estimated)
- Apparent size (V): 1.8′ × 1.2′

Other designations
- ESO 374- G 029, IRAS 10031-3358, 2MASX J10052305-3413118, MCG -06-22-017, PGC 29278

NGC 3120 is an intermediate spiral galaxy in the constellation of Antlia. Its velocity with respect to the cosmic microwave background is 3,105±22 km/s, which corresponds to a Hubble distance of 149.4 ± 10.5 Mly (45.80 ± 3.22 Mpc). However, 17 non-redshift measurements give a much closer mean distance of 97.19 ± 5.92 Mly (29.800 ± 1.816 Mpc). It was discovered by British astronomer John Herschel on 22 January 1838.

NGC 3120 has a possible active galactic nucleus, i.e. it has a compact region at the center of a galaxy that emits a significant amount of energy across the electromagnetic spectrum, with characteristics indicating that this luminosity is not produced by the stars.

== NGC 3038 Group ==
NGC 3120 is a member of the NGC 3038 group (also known as LGG 184). This group has 6 galaxies, including NGC 3038, NGC 3087, IC 2532, ESO 373-21, and ESO 373-26.

== Supernovae ==
Two supernovae have been observed in NGC 3120:

- SN 1999ca (Type II, mag. 17) was discovered by S. Woodings, R. Martin, and A. Williams on 27 April 1999.
- SN 2010F (Type II, mag. 14.8) was discovered by The CHilean Automatic Supernova sEarch (CHASE) on 13 January 2010.

== See also ==
- List of NGC objects (3001–4000)
