= NGC 3137 =

Galaxy in the constellation Antlia

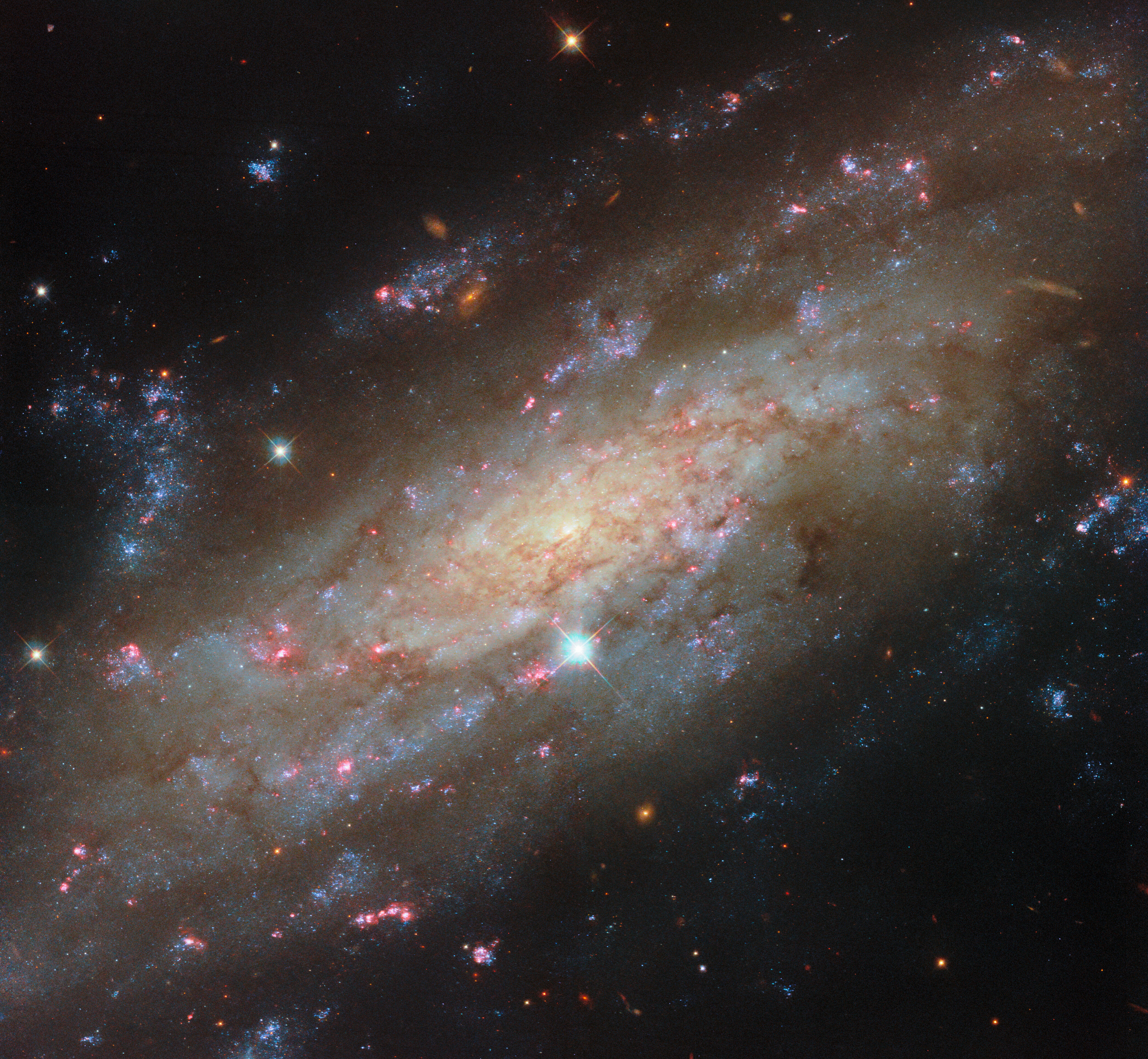
- NGC 3137 imaged by the Hubble Space Telescope

Observation data (J2000 epoch)
- Constellation: Antlia
- Right ascension: 10^{h} 09^{m} 07.3775^{s}
- Declination: −29° 03′ 50.485″
- Redshift: 0.003683 ± 0.000002
- Heliocentric radial velocity: 1,104 ± 1 km/s
- Distance: 52.6 ± 9.1 Mly (16.1 ± 2.8 Mpc)
- Group or cluster: NGC 3175 Group (LGG 189)
- Apparent magnitude (V): 11.5

Characteristics
- Type: SA(s)d
- Size: ~137,700 ly (42.22 kpc) (estimated)
- Apparent size (V): 6.3′ × 2.2′

Other designations
- ESO 435- G 047, AM 1006-284, IRAS 10068-2849, UGCA 203, MCG -05-24-024, PGC 29530

NGC 3137 is a spiral galaxy in the constellation Antlia. The galaxy lies about 50 million light years away from Earth, which means, given its apparent dimensions, that NGC 3137 is approximately 140,000 light years across. It was discovered by John Herschel on February 5, 1837.

NGC 3137 has a moderately bright nucleus. The spiral pattern is similar to NGC 3621 and the Pinwheel Galaxy, and features multiple knots. The morphological classification of this galaxy is SA(s)d, which indicates the galaxy doesn't have a bar (SA), lacks an inner ring structure (s), and has loosely wound spiral arms (d). A foreground star is superposed 0.3 arcminutes from the centre. The galaxy is seen at an inclination of about 70°.

The star formation rate of the galaxy is estimated to be 0.5 M_{☉} per year based on the CO(2-1) radio emission detected by the Atacama Large Millimeter Array. The total hydrogen mass of the galaxy is estimated to be 10^{9.68} M_{☉}. The stellar mass of the galaxy is comparable, at 10^{9.88} M_{☉}. In the centre of the galaxy lies a supermassive black hole, whose mass is estimated to be 10^{7.78 ± 0.20} (38 — 95 million) M_{☉}, based on the pitch angle of the spiral arms.

NGC 3137 is a member of the NGC 3175 Group (also known as LGG 189). It is one of the two large spirals of the group, the other being NGC 3175. Other members of the group include NGC 3113, NGC 3125, and ESO 499-37.

== See also ==
- List of NGC objects (3001–4000)
