= HD 93083 b =

Extrasolar planet

HD 93083 b Melquíades
Discovery
- Discovered by: Lovis et al.
- Discovery site: La Silla Observatory, Chile
- Discovery date: 14 February 2005
- Detection method: Radial Velocity

Orbital characteristics
- Apastron: 0.544 AU (81,400,000 km)
- Periastron: 0.410 AU (61,300,000 km)
- Semi-major axis: 0.477 AU (71,400,000 km)
- Eccentricity: 0.14 ± 0.03
- Orbital period (sidereal): 143.58 ± 0.6 d 0.3931 y
- Average orbital speed: 36.3
- Time of periastron: 2,453,181.7 ± 3.0
- Argument of periastron: 333.5 ± 7.9
- Semi-amplitude: 18.30 ± 0.5
- Star: HD 93083

Physical characteristics
- Mass: >0.37 M_{J} (>118 M_{🜨})

HD 93083 b is an extrasolar planet orbiting the K-type subgiant star HD 93083 in the constellation Antlia. It is probably much less massive than Jupiter, although only the minimum mass is known. The planet's mean distance from the star is about half that of Earth, and the orbit is slightly eccentric. This planet was discovered by the HARPS search team.

The planet HD 93083 b is named Melquíades. The name was selected in the NameExoWorlds campaign by Colombia, during the 100th anniversary of the IAU. Melquíades is a fictional character in the novel One Hundred Years of Solitude, who walks around Macondo (name of the host star HD 93083).

HD 93083 b lies within the habitable zone of its host star. Stability analysis reveals that the orbits of Earth-sized planets located in HD 93083 b's Trojan points would be stable for long periods of time.

== See also ==
- High Accuracy Radial Velocity Planet Searcher or HARPS
