= V Antliae =

Star in the constellation Antlia

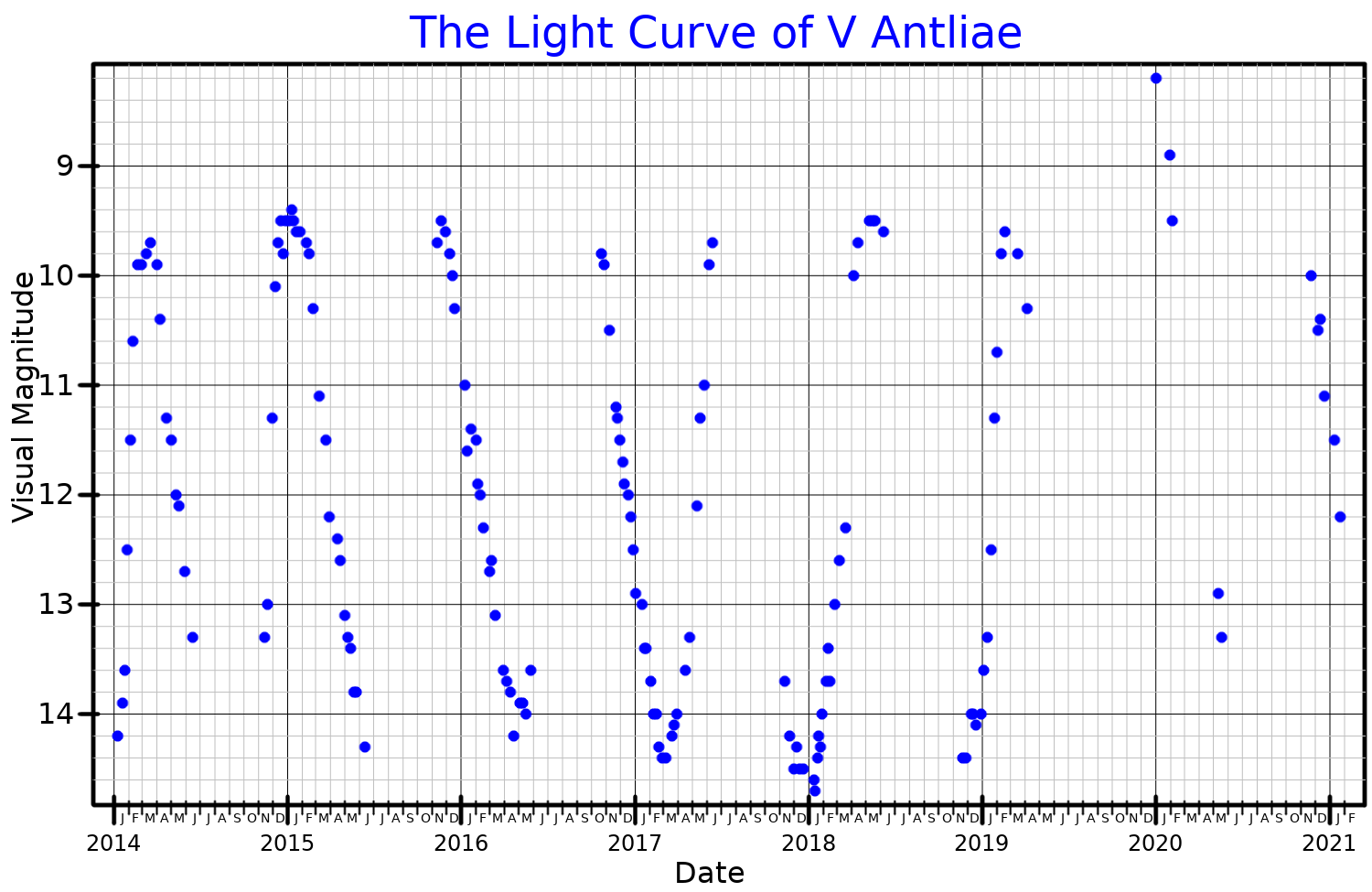
- The visual band light curve of V Antliae, from AAVSO data

Observation data Epoch J2000 Equinox J2000
- Constellation: Antlia
- Right ascension: 10^{h} 21^{m} 09.11141^{s}
- Declination: −34° 47′ 18.7444″
- Apparent magnitude (V): 8.2 - 14.0

Characteristics
- Evolutionary stage: AGB
- Spectral type: M7IIIe
- Variable type: Mira

Astrometry
Radial velocity (R_{v})	2.00 km/s
Proper motion (μ)	RA: −2.560 mas/yr Dec.: +7.487 mas/yr
Parallax (π)	1.1397±0.0687 mas
Distance	2,900 ± 200 ly (880 ± 50 pc)

Details
Mass	3.2 M_{☉}
Radius	620 R_{☉}
Luminosity	24,000 L_{☉}
Surface gravity (log g)	1.25 cgs
Temperature	3,293 K

Other designations
- 2MASS J10210911-3447188, HIP 50697

Database references
SIMBAD	data

V Antliae (V Ant) is a Mira variable star in the constellation Antlia. It varies in brightness between magnitudes 8.2 and 14.0 with a period of 303 days. Even at its brightest, it is far too faint to be seen with the naked eye.

V Antliae's variability was discovered by examining Harvard College Observatory photographic plates, and was announced by Henrietta S. Leavitt and Edward C. Pickering in 1913.

1612 MHz OH maser emission was first detected from this star in 1973. The star's water vapor emission line at 22 GHz was first observed at Haystack Observatory in 1973.
