= WASP-66 =

Star in the constellation Antlia

Observation data Epoch J2000 Equinox ICRS
- Constellation: Antlia
- Right ascension: 10^{h} 32^{m} 53.993^{s}
- Declination: −34° 59′ 23.46″
- Apparent magnitude (V): 11.60

Characteristics
- Evolutionary stage: main sequence
- Spectral type: F4

Astrometry
Radial velocity (R_{v})	−9.79±0.96 km/s
Proper motion (μ)	RA: 11.452 mas/yr Dec.: −13.476 mas/yr
Parallax (π)	1.9962±0.0313 mas
Distance	1,630 ± 30 ly (501 ± 8 pc)

Details
Mass	1.30±0.07 M_{☉}
Radius	1.75±0.09 R_{☉}
Luminosity	4.3 L_{☉}
Surface gravity (log g)	5.00 cgs
Temperature	6,600±150 K
Metallicity [Fe/H]	0.05 dex
Rotational velocity (v sin i)	13.4±0.9 km/s
Age	3.7+0.7 −1.2 Gyr

Other designations
- TOI-661, TIC 53735810, WASP-66, TYC 7193-1804-1, 2MASS J10325399-3459234

Database references
SIMBAD	data
Exoplanet Archive	data

WASP-66, also known as TYC 7193-1804-1, is an F-type star in the constellation Antlia. It has an apparent magnitude of 11.6, which is much too faint to be seen with the unaided eye and is located at a distance of 1,630 light-years.

WASP-66 has a classification of F4, which states that it is an ordinary F-type main sequence star that is fusing hydrogen at its core. At present it has 130% the mass of the Sun and 175 the radius of the Sun. It has an effective temperature of 6,600 K, which gives it a yellowish-white hue. The star is younger than the Sun at, 3.7+0.7
−1.2 billion years, and may be either metal-poor or similar to Sun in its concentration of heavy elements. Currently it is spinning moderately with a projected rotational velocity of 13.4 km/s.

According to a survey published in 2017, WASP-66 has one suspected companion - a red dwarf star with an effective temperature of 3,330±150 K and a projected separation of 6,800±700 AU.

== Planetary system ==
In 2012, a superjovian planet around WASP-66 was discovered. WASP-66b has a mass that is about 2.3 times that of Jupiter. It takes just over 4 days to complete an orbit around its star, making it a typical hot Jupiter. The planet was discovered by the transit method – this is when a planet passes in front of a star, temporarily blocking some of the star's light.

The planetary orbit is well aligned with the equatorial plane of the star, the misalignment angle being equal to −4±22°.

The WASP-66 planetary system
Companion (in order from star)	Mass	Semimajor axis (AU)	Orbital period (days)	Eccentricity	Inclination (°)	Radius
b	2.37±0.14 M_{J}	0.05461^{+0.00099}_{−0.00096}	4.0860520±0.000007	<0.046	85.9±0.9	1.09^{+0.25}_{−0.19} R_{J}
