= DENIS J1048−3956 =

Star in the constellation Antlia

- Location of DENIS J1048−3956 in the constellation Antlia

Observation data Epoch J2000 Equinox ICRS
- Constellation: Antlia
- Right ascension: 10^{h} 48^{m} 14.574^{s}
- Declination: −39° 56′ 06.84″
- Apparent magnitude (V): 17.532

Characteristics
- Spectral type: M8.5Ve:
- Apparent magnitude (J): 9.5

Astrometry
| Radial velocity (R_{v}) | −11±2/> km/s |
| Proper motion (μ) | RA: −1,179.311 mas/yr Dec.: −988.121 mas/yr |
| Parallax (π) | 247.2156±0.0512 mas |
| Distance | 13.193 ± 0.003 ly (4.0451 ± 0.0008 pc) |
| Absolute magnitude (M_{V}) | 19.37 |

Details
| Mass | 0.075 M_{☉} |
| Radius | 0.108 R_{☉} |
| Surface gravity (log g) | 4.3±0.3 cgs |
| Temperature | 2330±60 K |
| Age | <1 Gyr |

Other designations
- GJ 11547, 2MASS J10481463−3956062, 2MASSI J1048147−395606, 2MUCD 20385, DENIS-P J104814.9−395604, DENIS-P J104814.7−395606, DEN 1048−3956, USNO-B1.0 0500-00227632

Database references
| SIMBAD | data |

DENIS J1048−3956 is an exceptionally small, dim ultra-cool red dwarf star 13.2 light-years (4.0 parsecs) from Earth in the southern constellation of Antlia, among the stars closest to Earth. This star is very dim with an apparent magnitude of about 17, and requires a telescope with a camera to be seen. It was discovered in 2000 by Xavier Delfosse (Institute of Astrophysics of the Canary Islands, now Observatoire de Grenoble) and Thierry Forveille (Canada–France–Hawaii Telescope Corporation), with the assistance of nine other astronomers.

Kinematically, DENIS J1048−3956 belongs to the young thin disc. In 2005 a powerful flare from this object was detected by radio astronomy.

== See also ==
- List of nearest stars and brown dwarfs
