= NGC 3244 =

Spiral galaxy in the constellation Antlia

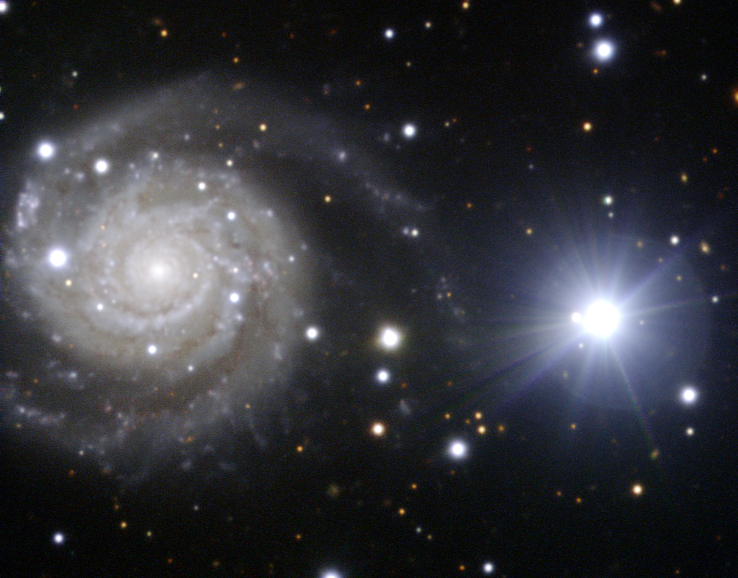
- ESO image of NGC 3244 (left) and star TYC 7713 (right)

Observation data (J2000 epoch)
- Constellation: Antlia
- Right ascension: 10^{h} 25^{m} 28.8516^{s}
- Declination: −39° 49′ 39.148″
- Redshift: 0.009213
- Heliocentric radial velocity: 2762 ± 2 km/s
- Distance: 147.6 ± 10.4 Mly (45.25 ± 3.18 Mpc)
- Apparent magnitude (V): 12.89

Characteristics
- Type: SA(rs)cd
- Size: ~87,900 ly (26.94 kpc) (estimated)
- Apparent size (V): 2.0′ × 1.5′

Other designations
- ESO 317- G 024, IRAS 10232-3934, MCG -07-22-005, PGC 30594

NGC 3244 is a spiral galaxy in the constellation Antlia. Its velocity with respect to the cosmic microwave background is 3068 ± 22 km/s, which corresponds to a Hubble distance of 147.6 ± 10.4 Mly (45.25 ± 3.18 Mpc). However, 10 non-redshift measurements give a closer distance of 91.88 ± 7.36 Mly (28.170 ± 2.256 Mpc). It was discovered by British astronomer John Herschel on 22 April 1835. The ESO image shown was taken with the help of the President of Czechia, Václav Klaus, during his visit to ESO’s Paranal Observatory, on the night of 6 April 2011.

== Supernova ==
One supernova has been observed in NGC 3244. SN 2010ev (Type Ia, mag. 14.3) was discovered by CHASE (CHilean Automatic Supernovas sEarch) and by the Brazilian Supernovae Search on 27 June 2010. With a peak apparent magnitude of about 14, it was the third-brightest supernova observed in 2010.

== Gallery ==
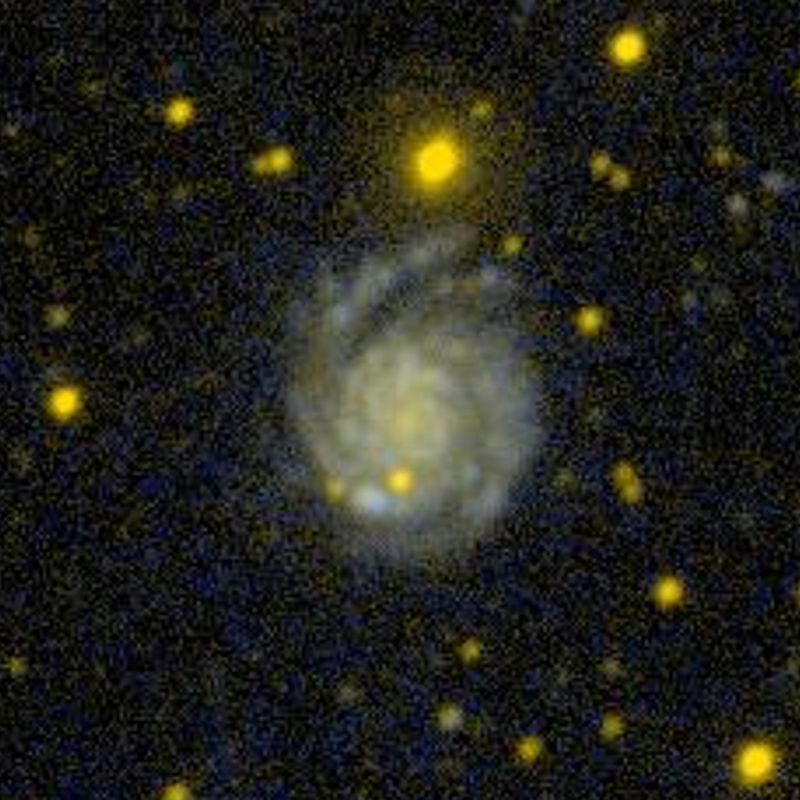
NGC 3244 by GALEX

== See also ==
- New General Catalogue
- List of NGC objects (3001–4000)
