= S Antliae =

Star in the constellation Antlia

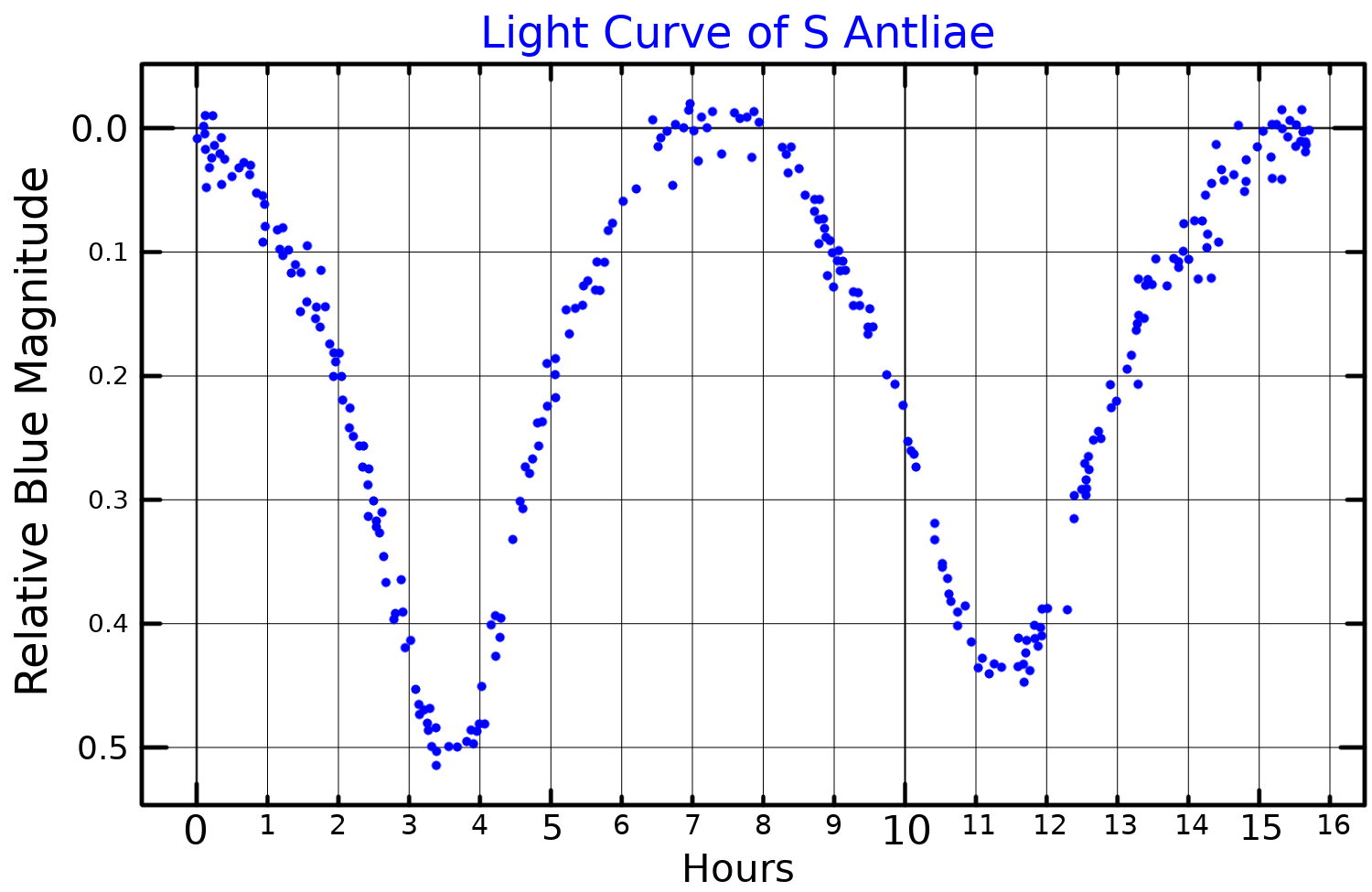
- The blue light curve of S Antliae, adapted from Hogg & Bowe (1950)

Observation data Epoch J2000 Equinox ICRS
- Constellation: Antlia
- Right ascension: 09^{h} 32^{m} 18.38648^{s}
- Declination: −28° 37′ 39.9685″
- Apparent magnitude (V): 6.27 to 6.83

Characteristics
- Spectral type: A9V
- B−V color index: 0.33
- Variable type: Eclipsing binary W UMa type

Astrometry
Proper motion (μ)	RA: −89.375 mas/yr Dec.: +44.049 mas/yr
Parallax (π)	12.6116±0.0203 mas
Distance	258.6 ± 0.4 ly (79.3 ± 0.1 pc)
Absolute magnitude (M_{V})	1.963 (2.25 + 3.42)

Orbit
Period (P)	0.59145447(30) days
Semi-major axis (a)	3.82±0.02 R_{☉}
Inclination (i)	74.02±0.14°
Semi-amplitude (K_{1}) (primary)	75±1 km/s
Semi-amplitude (K_{2}) (secondary)	234±1 km/s

Details

A
Mass	1.66±0.10 M_{☉}
Radius	2.09±0.11 R_{☉}
Luminosity	10.0±2.2 L_{☉}
Surface gravity (log g)	4.02±0.03 cgs
Temperature	7,100±200 K

B
Mass	0.55±0.05 M_{☉}
Radius	1.31±0.06 R_{☉}
Luminosity	3.4±0.7 L_{☉}
Temperature	6,859±200 K
Age	1.9 Gyr

Other designations
- CD-28°7373, HD 82610, SAO 177619, HIP 46810, HR 3798.

Database references
SIMBAD	data

S Antliae is a W Ursae Majoris-type eclipsing binary star in Antlia.

== Characteristics ==
S Antiliae is classed as an A-type W Ursae Majoris variable, since the primary is hotter than the secondary and the drop in magnitude is caused by the latter passing in front of the former. S Antiliae varies in apparent magnitude from 6.27 to 6.83 over a period of 15.6 hours. The system shines with a combined spectrum of A9V.

The system's orbital period is about 0.591 days. The stars' centres are an average of 3.82 times the Sun's radius apart. The system will evolve into an Algol variable.

Calculating the properties of the component stars indicates that the primary star has a mass 1.66 times and a diameter 2.09 times that of the Sun, and the secondary has a mass 0.55 times and a diameter 1.31 times that of the Sun. The primary has a surface temperature of 7,100 K, while the secondary is a little cooler at 6,859 K. The two stars have similar luminosity and spectral type as they have a common envelope and share stellar material. The system is thought to be around two billion years old.

Based upon an annual parallax shift of 12.6116 milliarc seconds as measured by the Gaia satellite, this system is 259 light-years (79.3 parsecs) from Earth. Analysing and recalibrating yields a parallax of 13.30 and hence a distance of 250 light-years (76 parsecs).

== History ==
The star's variability was first recorded in 1888 by H.M. Paul, when it had the shortest known period of any variable star. It was initially thought to be an Algol-type eclipsing binary, but this was discounted by E.C. Pickering on account of it lacking a shallow minimum in its maximum and the width of its minimum period. Alfred H. Joy noted the similarity of its light curve to W Ursae Majoris in 1926, concluding the system was indeed an eclipsing binary with two stars of spectral type A8.
