= Antlia II =

Low surface-brightness dwarf satellite galaxy of the Milky Way

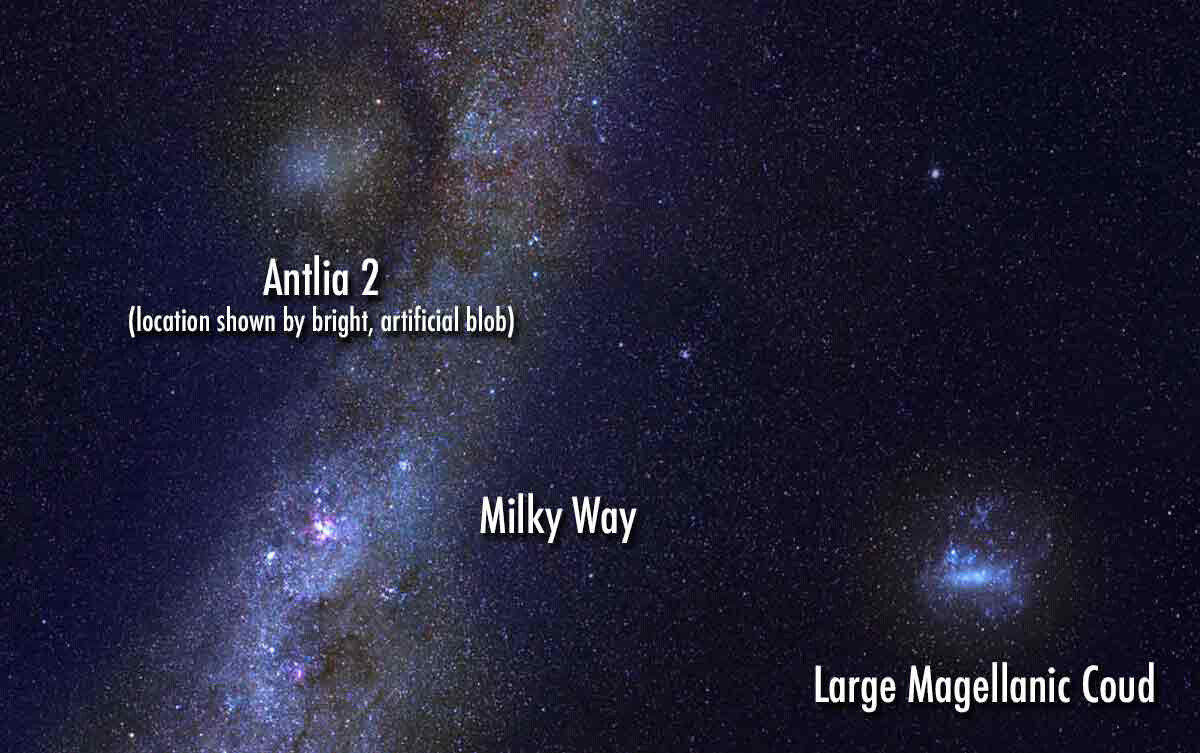
- Illustration

Observation data (J2000 epoch)
- Pronunciation: /ˈæntliə ... /
- Constellation: Antlia
- Right ascension: 9^{h} 35^{m} 32.832^{s}
- Declination: -36° -46^{m} -2.28^{s}
- Distance: 405,000 ly (124.1 kpc)
- Group or cluster: Local Group
- Absolute magnitude (V): −9.86±0.08 mag

Characteristics
- Type: Irr-T
- Size: 11 kly
- Half-light radius (physical): 2.5 kpc
- Half-light radius (apparent): 1.10°
- Notable features: satellite of Milky Way

Other designations
- Antlia 2, Ant 2, Ant Il, UGC 49743, CGCG 49794-49.4794

Antlia II (Ant II) is a low-surface-brightness dwarf satellite galaxy of the Milky Way at a galactic latitude of 11.2°. It spans 1.26° in the sky just southeast of Epsilon Antliae. The galaxy is similar in size to the Large Magellanic Cloud, despite being 1/10,000 as bright. Antlia II has the lowest surface brightness of any galaxy discovered and is ~ 100 times more diffuse than any known ultra diffuse galaxy. The large size of the galaxy suggests that it is currently being tidally disrupted, and is in the process of becoming a stellar stream. The southeast side of Antlia II is farther away than the northwest side, likely due to the tidal disruption. It was discovered using data from the European Space Agency's Gaia spacecraft in November 2018.

== See also ==
- Crater 2 Dwarf
- Antlia Dwarf
- Satellite galaxies of the Milky Way
