= Alpha Antliae =

Star in the constellation Antlia

α Antliae
- Location of α Antliae (circled in red)

Observation data Epoch J2000.0 Equinox J2000.0 (ICRS)
- Constellation: Antlia
- Right ascension: 10^{h} 27^{m} 09.101^{s}
- Declination: −31° 04′ 04.00″
- Apparent magnitude (V): 4.25 (4.22 to 4.29)

Characteristics
- Spectral type: K4 III
- U−B color index: +1.63
- B−V color index: +1.45
- R−I color index: +0.79
- Variable type: Suspected

Astrometry
Radial velocity (R_{v})	12.2±2 km/s
Proper motion (μ)	RA: −81.320 mas/yr Dec.: +9.798 mas/yr
Parallax (π)	8.9069±0.1513 mas
Distance	366 ± 6 ly (112 ± 2 pc)
Absolute magnitude (M_{V})	−0.97

Details
Mass	2.2 M_{☉}
Radius	41 R_{☉}
Luminosity (bolometric)	412 L_{☉}
Surface gravity (log g)	1.77 cgs
Temperature	4,070 K
Metallicity [Fe/H]	−0.39 dex

Other designations
- α Ant, Alpha Antliae, Alpha Ant, NSV 4862, CD−30 8465, CPD−30 3121, FK5 392, GC 14352, HD 90610, HIP 51172, HR 4104, SAO 201405, PPM 287713, 2MASS J10270911-3104039

Database references
SIMBAD	data

Alpha Antliae is the brightest star in the southern constellation of Antlia but it has not been given a proper name. Its Bayer designation is Latinized from α Antliae, which is abbreviated Alpha Ant or α Ant, respectively. It is approximately 366 light-years from the Solar System. α Antliae has an apparent visual magnitude of 4.25, which is bright enough to be faintly visible to the naked eye. It has been reported to vary in brightness between magnitude 4.22 and 4.29, first in 1879 by Benjamin Gould, but this has not been confirmed in modern times. It is receding with a heliocentric radial velocity of 12 km/s.

It is a K-type giant star with a stellar classification of K4 III. The evolutionary state of α Antliae is not clear but it is suspected of being on the asymptotic giant branch, with an inert carbon core. It has 2.2 times the mass of the Sun and has expanded to 41 times the solar radius. Compared to the Sun, it has only 41% of the abundance of elements other than hydrogen and helium. It is radiating 412 times the luminosity of the Sun from its enlarged photosphere at an effective temperature of 4,070 K.
