= HD 93083 =

Star in the constellation Antlia

HD 93083 / Macondo
Observation data Epoch J2000 Equinox J2000
- Constellation: Antlia
- Right ascension: 10^{h} 44^{m} 20.91501^{s}
- Declination: −33° 34′ 37.2880″
- Apparent magnitude (V): 8.30

Characteristics
- Evolutionary stage: Main sequence
- Spectral type: K2IV-V or K3V
- B−V color index: 0.945±0.001

Astrometry
Radial velocity (R_{v})	+43.44±0.12 km/s
Proper motion (μ)	RA: −92.635 mas/yr Dec.: −152.119 mas/yr
Parallax (π)	35.1056±0.0212 mas
Distance	92.91 ± 0.06 ly (28.49 ± 0.02 pc)
Absolute magnitude (M_{V})	6.08

Details
Mass	0.836+0.023 −0.025 M_{☉}
Radius	0.837+0.026 −0.018 R_{☉}
Luminosity	0.407+0.038 −0.031 L_{☉}
Surface gravity (log g)	4.23±0.07 cgs
Temperature	5,034+86 −77 K
Metallicity [Fe/H]	0.13±0.07 dex
Rotation	32.3+1.2 −1.3 d
Rotational velocity (v sin i)	2.219±0.531 km/s
Age	10.71+2.24 −1.25 Gyr

Other designations
- Macondo, CD−32°7598, GJ 1137, HD 93083, HIP 52521, SAO 201693, PPM 288057, GSC 07190-02048

Database references
SIMBAD	data
Exoplanet Archive	data
ARICNS	data

HD 93083 (or GJ 1137) is an orange-hued star in the southern constellation of Antlia. It has the proper name Macondo, after the mythical village of the novel One Hundred Years of Solitude (Cien años de soledad). The name was selected by Colombia during the IAU's NameExoWorlds campaign. The star has an apparent visual magnitude of 8.30, which is too faint to be visible to the naked eye. It is located at a distance of 93 light-years from the Sun based on parallax. HD 93083 is drifting further away with a radial velocity of +43.65 km/s, having come to within 43 light-years some 484,000 years ago.

This is a K-type main-sequence star that has been assigned a stellar classification of K2IV-V or K3V, depending on the study. It is smaller and less massive than the Sun, with a higher metallicity, or abundance of elements heavier than helium. The star is roughly six billion years old with a low projected rotational velocity of 2.2 km/s, and has an expected main sequence lifetime of 20.4 billion years. It is a source of X-ray emission with a luminosity of 7.9×10^{26} erg s^{−1}. The star is radiating around 41% of the luminosity of the Sun from its photosphere at an effective temperature of 5,030 K.

== Planetary system ==
In 2005, the discovery of a Saturn-mass exoplanet orbiting the star was announced. This was a discovery using the radial velocity method with the HARPS spectrograph. The planet was given the name Melquíades by the IAU in 2019 after a character in the book One Hundred Years of Solitude. The orbit of this body is in or near the habitable zone of the host star; according to a 2007 study, it is entirely within the habitable zone, but more recent models place it near the inner edge. It is theoretically possible that a large moon orbiting the planet, or a hypothetical terrestrial exoplanet at a trojan point, could be habitable.

A second planet was found in 2026, also with HARPS radial velocity observations. It is a super-Earth at least 5 times Earth's mass, orbiting with a short period of 9.6 days. Another long-period radial velocity signal is due to the star's magnetic activity cycle rather than a planet.

The HD 93083 planetary system
Companion (in order from star)	Mass	Semimajor axis (AU)	Orbital period (days)	Eccentricity	Inclination	Radius
c	≥5.12+0.70 −0.69 M_{🜨}	0.0835±0.0008	9.6412+0.0012 −0.0011	0	—	—
b / Melquíades	≥0.451±0.012 M_{J}	0.508±0.005	144.720±0.029	0.118+0.016 −0.015	—	—

== See also ==
- List of extrasolar planets
- HARPS spectrograph
