= Theta Antliae =

Binary star system in the constellation Antlia

θ Antliae
- Location of θ Antliae (circled)

Observation data Epoch J2000 Equinox ICRS
- Constellation: Antlia
- Right ascension: 09^{h} 44^{m} 12.09512^{s}
- Declination: −27° 46′ 10.1011″
- Apparent magnitude (V): 4.79

Characteristics
- Spectral type: G7 III + A8 Vm
- U−B color index: +0.35
- B−V color index: +0.50

Astrometry
Radial velocity (R_{v})	+24.0 km/s
Proper motion (μ)	RA: −53.23 mas/yr Dec.: +37.24 mas/yr
Parallax (π)	9.61±0.46 mas
Distance	340 ± 20 ly (104 ± 5 pc)
Absolute magnitude (M_{V})	−0.30

Orbit
Period (P)	18.423±0.019 yr
Semi-major axis (a)	0.10904±0.00032″
Eccentricity (e)	0.4956±0.0031
Inclination (i)	126.19±0.44°
Longitude of the node (Ω)	175.66±0.44°
Periastron epoch (T)	2020.913±0.025
Argument of periastron (ω) (secondary)	138.04±0.86°

Details

θ Ant A
Mass	1.8±0.1 M_{☉}

θ Ant B
Mass	2.1±0.5 M_{☉}

Other designations
- θ Antliae, Tet Ant, θ Ant, CD−27 6881, FK5 366, HD 84367, HIP 47758, HR 3871, SAO 177908, PPM 256646

Database references
SIMBAD	data

Theta Antliae is a binary star system in the southern constellation of Antlia. Its identifier is a Bayer designation that was Latinized from θ Antliae, and is abbreviated Tet Ant or θ Ant, respectively. The pair have a combined apparent visual magnitude of +4.78, which is bright enough to be faintly visible to the naked eye. The brighter component is magnitude +5.30 while the secondary is +6.18. Based upon parallax measurements, it is located at a distance of around 340 light-years (104 parsecs) from Earth. The system is receding with a heliocentric radial velocity of +24 km/s.

The binary nature of this system was discovered by W. S. Finsen in 1952. The primary component of this system, θ Antliae A, has a stellar classification of A8 Vm, indicating that it is an A-type main sequence star with enhanced metallic lines in its spectrum. The companion, θ Antliae B, is a giant star with a classification of G7 III. The pair have an orbital period of 18.423 years, a significant eccentricity of 0.4956, and an angular semi-major axis of 0.10904 arcseconds.
