= Epsilon Antliae =

Star in the constellation Antlia

- Location of ε Antliae (circled)

Observation data Epoch J2000 Equinox J2000
- Constellation: Antlia
- Right ascension: 09^{h} 29^{m} 14.720^{s}
- Declination: −35° 57′ 04.81″
- Apparent magnitude (V): +4.51

Characteristics
- Spectral type: K3 IIIa
- U−B color index: +1.68
- B−V color index: +1.44

Astrometry
Radial velocity (R_{v})	+22.2 km/s
Proper motion (μ)	RA: −24.844 mas/yr Dec.: +5.720 mas/yr
Parallax (π)	4.6349±0.0920 mas
Distance	700 ± 10 ly (216 ± 4 pc)
Absolute magnitude (M_{V})	−2.17

Details
Mass	2.3 M_{☉}
Radius	53 R_{☉}
Luminosity	901 L_{☉}
Surface gravity (log g)	1.86 cgs
Temperature	4.348 K
Metallicity [Fe/H]	−0.14 dex
Rotational velocity (v sin i)	3.3 km/s

Other designations
- ε Ant, CD−35 5724, FK5 356, HD 82150, HIP 46515, HR 3765, SAO 200416, PPM 286515

Database references
SIMBAD	data

Epsilon Antliae is a single star in the southern constellation of Antlia. It is positioned near the western constellation border and forms part of the main asterism. The Bayer designation is Latinized from ε Antliae, and abbreviated Eps Ant or ε Ant, respectively. The apparent visual magnitude of this star is +4.51, which means it is visible to the naked eye at night. From parallax measurements, the distance to this star is approximately 700 light-years (210 parsecs). It is drifting further away from the Sun with a radial velocity of +22 km/s.

The stellar classification of this star is K3 IIIa, where the luminosity class of III indicates that this is an evolved giant star that has exhausted the supply of hydrogen at its core. It has expanded to around 56 times the radius of the Sun and radiates approximately 919 times the Sun's luminosity from its photosphere at an effective temperature of 4,237 K. Photometry measurements during the Hipparcos mission indicate that this star is undergoing periodic luminosity variation by 0.0034 magnitudes over an 11.07941 day cycle.

== See also ==
- Antlia 2
