= Eta Antliae =

Star in the constellation Antlia

η Antliae
- Location of η Antliae (circled)

Observation data Epoch J2000.0 Equinox ICRS
- Constellation: Antlia
- Right ascension: 09^{h} 58^{m} 52.275^{s}
- Declination: −35° 53′ 27.50″
- Apparent magnitude (V): 5.222

Characteristics
- Evolutionary stage: main sequence
- Spectral type: F1 V
- U−B color index: +0.068
- B−V color index: +0.333

Astrometry
Radial velocity (R_{v})	+30 km/s
Proper motion (μ)	RA: −89.728 mas/yr Dec.: −15.945 mas/yr
Parallax (π)	30.0499±0.0776 mas
Distance	108.5 ± 0.3 ly (33.28 ± 0.09 pc)
Absolute magnitude (M_{V})	+2.62

Details

η Ant A
Mass	1.55 M_{☉}
Radius	1.72 R_{☉}
Luminosity	6.6 L_{☉}
Surface gravity (log g)	3.94 cgs
Temperature	7,132 K
Metallicity [Fe/H]	−0.20 dex
Age	0.9 Gyr

Other designations
- η Antliae, Eta Ant, η Ant, CD−35 6050, FK5 377, HD 86629, HIP 48926, HR 3947, SAO 200926, PPM 287133

Database references
SIMBAD	data
- binary set

Eta Antliae is a double star in the southern constellation of Antlia. Its Bayer designation is Latinized from η Antliae, and abbreviated Eta Ant or η Ant, respectively. The brighter component has an apparent visual magnitude of 5.222, making it visible to the naked eye. Parallax measurements of the system yield a distance estimate of 108.5 light-years (33.3 parsecs) from Earth. It is drifting further away with a heliocentric radial velocity of +30 km/s.

The main component has a stellar classification of F1 V, which indicates that it is an F-type main sequence star. This star has 55% more mass than the Sun and a 72% greater radius. It shines with 6.6 times the Sun's luminosity at an effective temperature of 7,132 K. This heat gives it the yellow-white glow of an F-type star. There is a faint companion star located 31 arcseconds away with an apparent magnitude of +11.3. Most likely this pair form a binary star system.
