= Iota Antliae =

Star in the constellation Antlia

ι Antliae
- Location of ι Antliae (circled)

Observation data Epoch J2000 Equinox ICRS
- Constellation: Antlia
- Right ascension: 10^{h} 56^{m} 43.051^{s}
- Declination: −37° 08′ 15.96″
- Apparent magnitude (V): +4.60

Characteristics
- Evolutionary stage: horizontal branch
- Spectral type: K1 III
- U−B color index: +0.84
- B−V color index: +1.03

Astrometry
Radial velocity (R_{v})	2.04±0.12 km/s
Proper motion (μ)	RA: +74.069 mas/yr Dec.: −124.443 mas/yr
Parallax (π)	15.7132±0.1156 mas
Distance	208 ± 2 ly (63.6 ± 0.5 pc)
Absolute magnitude (M_{V})	+0.65

Details
Mass	1.74±0.196 M_{☉}
Radius	10.71±0.23 R_{☉}
Luminosity	58.01±1.64 L_{☉}
Surface gravity (log g)	2.6±0.09 cgs
Temperature	4,867±38 K
Metallicity [Fe/H]	−0.02±0.03 dex
Age	3.32 Gyr

Other designations
- ι Ant, CD−36 6808, CPD−36 4700, FK5 414, HD 94890, HIP 53502, HR 4273, SAO 201927, PPM 288317

Database references
SIMBAD	data

Iota Antliae is a single, orange-hued star in the southern constellation of Antlia. Its identifier is a Bayer designation that is Latinized from ι Antliae, and abbreviated Iot Ant or ι Ant, respectively. It has an apparent visual magnitude of +4.60, making it a faint naked eye star. From parallax measurements, the distance to this star can be estimated as 208 ± 2 light-years (63.64 ± 0.5 parsecs). It is drifting further away with a radial velocity of 2 km/s.

The spectrum of Iota Antliae matches a stellar classification of K1 III, indicating that this is an evolved star that is now in its giant phase. Having exhausted the supply of hydrogen at its core, the star has expanded and it now spans 11 times the radius of the Sun. It is a red clump giant, indicating it is on the horizontal branch and is generating energy through helium fusion. The star is 3.32 billion years old with 1.55 times the Sun's mass. It is radiating 58 times the luminosity of the Sun from its swollen photosphere at an effective temperature of 4,892 K.

== Planetary system ==
Two super-Jovian planets around Iota Antilae (or HD 94890), detected by the radial velocity method, were reported in 2025.

The Iota Antliae planetary system
Companion (in order from star)	Mass	Semimajor axis (AU)	Orbital period (days)	Eccentricity	Inclination (°)	Radius
b	≥2.13+0.16 −0.17 M_{J}	2.07±0.01	824.61+5.02 −4.80	0.22+0.08 −0.09	—	—
c	≥8.91+0.24 −0.25 M_{J}	4.33±0.02	2492.19+14.72 −13.94	0.05±0.03	—	—
