= PSR B0950+08 =

Radio pulsar in the constellation Leo

Observation data Epoch J2000 Equinox ICRS
- Constellation: Leo
- Right ascension: 09^{h} 53^{m} 09.310^{s}
- Declination: +07° 55′ 35.75″

Characteristics
- Spectral type: Pulsar
- Apparent magnitude (B): 27.07(16)

Astrometry
Proper motion (μ)	RA: −2.09 mas/yr Dec.: 29.46 mas/yr
Parallax (π)	3.82±0.07 mas
Distance	850 ± 20 ly (262 ± 5 pc)

Details
Rotation	0.2530654277593 s
Age	1.8 Myr

Other designations
- PSR J0953+0755, NVSS J095309+075536, PULS CP 0950, GAL 228.9+43.7, PSR B0950+08.

Database references
SIMBAD	data

PSR B0950+08 is a young pulsar that may have come from a supernova that occurred in the Constellation of Leo 1.8 million years ago. Off-pulse emissions from the young pulsar were detected by the Expanded Long Wavelength Array, suggesting the presence of a pulsar wind nebula around it.

PSR B0950+08 was fourth among the initial radio pulsars discovered in 1968. It completes rotation every 0.253 seconds.

It was postulated in 2002 to be related to the Antlia Supernova Remnant, but a 2021 study estimates the age of the remnant to be less than 100,000 years.
