= NGC 3175 =

Galaxy in the constellation Antlia

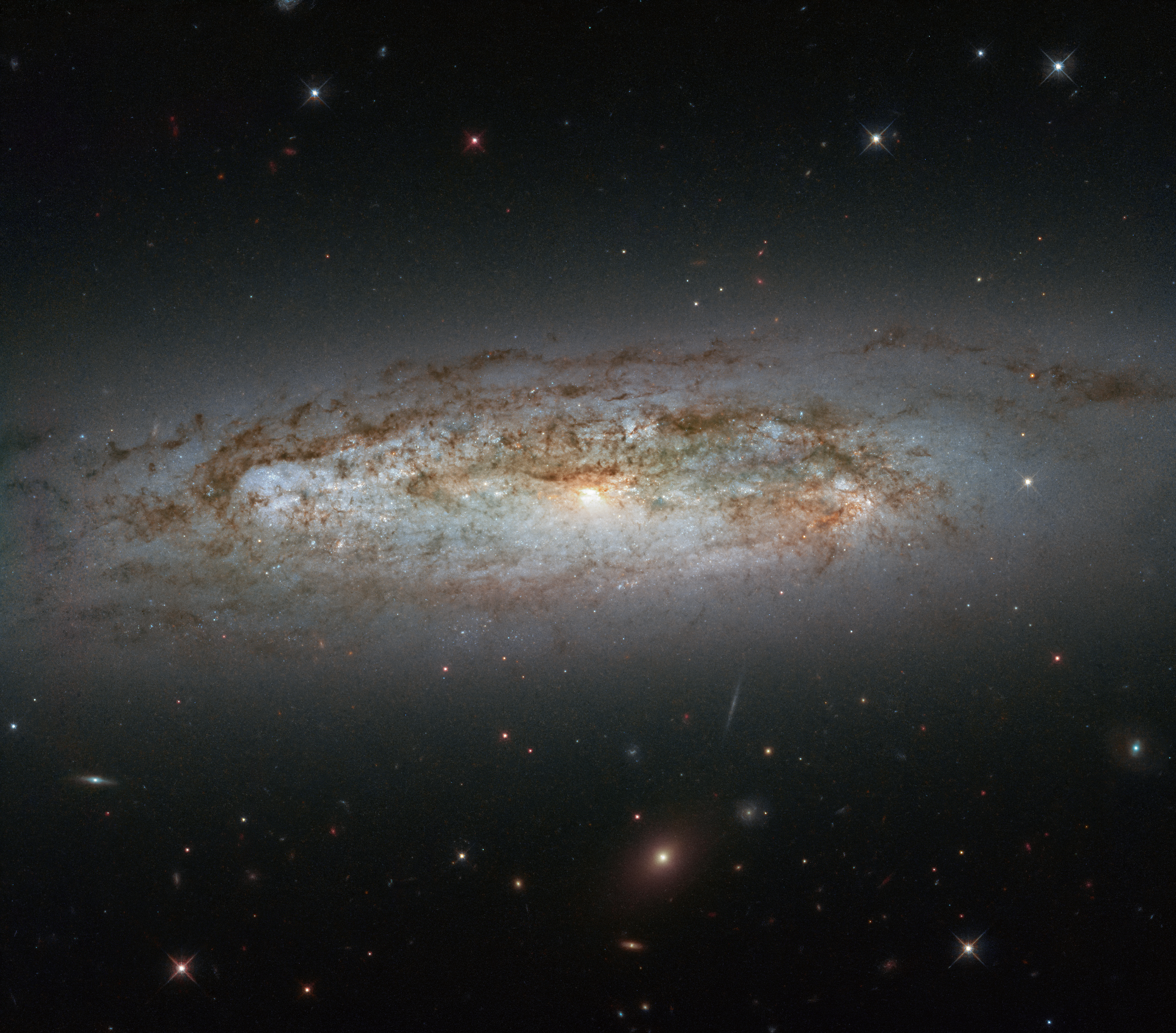
- NGC 3175 taken by the Hubble Space Telescope

Observation data (J2000 epoch)
- Constellation: Antlia
- Right ascension: 10^{h} 14^{m} 42.111^{s}
- Declination: −28° 52′ 19.42″
- Redshift: 0.003613
- Heliocentric radial velocity: 1,081.1 km/s
- Distance: 53.9 Mly (16.52 Mpc)
- Group or cluster: NGC 3175 group
- Apparent magnitude (B): 12.08

Characteristics
- Type: SAB(s)b
- Mass: (7.34±0.85)×10^{10} M_{☉}
- Mass/Light ratio: 7.13+1.78 −1.98 M_{☉}/L_{☉}
- Apparent size (V): 5′.0 × 1′.3

Other designations
- ESO 436- G 003, IRAS F10124−2837, 2MASX J10144211-2852194, NGC 3175, UGCA 207, LEDA 29892, MCG -05-24-028, VV 796

NGC 3175 is a spiral galaxy located in the far eastern part of the southern constellation of Antlia at an approximate distance of 54 million light-years. NGC 3175 was discovered on March 30, 1835 by English astronomer John Herschel, whose notes described it as, "considerably bright, large, much extended NE-SW, very gradually little brighter middle". This galaxy is the namesake of the NGC 3175 group of galaxies, which includes the spiral galaxy NGC 3137.

The morphological classification of this galaxy is SAB(s)b, which indicates a weakly-barred spiral galaxy (SAB) with no inner ring structure (s), and somewhat tightly wound spiral arms (b). It spans an angular size of 5′.0 × 1′.3, with the major axis aligned along a position angle of 56°. The plane of the galaxy is inclined at an angle of 77° to the line of sight from the Earth, and thus is being viewed close to edge on.

A study of the galaxy using the Australia Telescope Compact Array found that the outer disk of this galaxy, beyond a radius of 3.5 kpc from the core, is free of neutral hydrogen emission. This is an indication that no star formation is occurring, which is peculiar for a spiral galaxy. In contrast, the central region is undergoing star formation and contains 5.8×10^{8} M_{☉} of neutral hydrogen. There are no nearby galaxies that could explain the stripping of hydrogen gas from the outer part of the galaxy.

== See also ==
- Spiral galaxy
