= NGC 3261 =

Galaxy in the constellation Vela

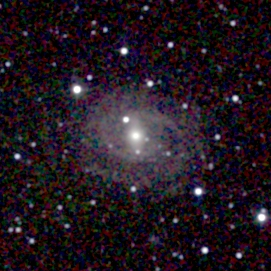
- NGC 3261 imaged in infrared by 2MASS

Observation data (J2000 epoch)
- Constellation: Vela
- Right ascension: 10^{h} 29^{m} 01.4531^{s}
- Declination: −44° 39′ 24.66″
- Redshift: 0.008549 ± 0.000017
- Heliocentric radial velocity: 2,563 ± 5 km/s
- Distance: 108 ± 7.5 Mly (33.2 ± 2.3 Mpc)
- Group or cluster: NGC 3261 Group (LGG 198)
- Apparent magnitude (V): 11.2

Characteristics
- Type: SB(rs)bc
- Apparent size (V): 3.7′ × 2.8′

Other designations
- ESO 263- G 040, AM 1026-442, IRAS 10268-4423, MCG -07-22-015, PGC 30868

NGC 3261 is a barred spiral galaxy in the constellation Vela. The galaxy lies about 110 million light years away from Earth based on redshift, which means, given its apparent dimensions, that NGC 3261 is approximately 130,000 light years across. It was discovered by John Herschel on March 15, 1836.

NGC 3261 has a low surface brightness bar with a bright nucleus. At the end of the bar there is a nearly complete inner pseudoring formed by the spiral arm. From the ring emanate two diffuse spiral arms that can be traced for more than half a revolution. The east arm is better defined than the west arm but at around two thirds of its length becomes diffuse. The spiral pattern is between a grand design galaxy and a multiple arms pattern, with at least ten spiral fragments visible.

NGC 3261 is the main member of the NGC 3261 Group (also known as LGG 198), which according to Garcia, also includes NGC 3256 and NGC 3256C. Four companion galaxies are visible south of NGC 3261, the two of them lying close to it. NGC 3261 lies about 9 degrees south of the Antlia Cluster, which lies at a similar redshift.

== Supernovae ==
Two supernovae have been observed in NGC 3261.

- SN 1997Z was discovered on 10 February 1997 by R. Martin, A. Williams, and S. Woodings, Perth Observatory, at an apparent magnitude of 15.5. It was identified as a Type II supernova several months post maximum.
- SN 2008fw was discovered on 19 September 2008 by Berto Monard at an apparent magnitude of 14.3, lying 52" west and 30" south of the galaxy center. The spectral analysis showed it was a Type Ia supernova near maximum light.

== See also ==
- List of NGC objects (3001–4000)
