= Antlia supernova remnant =

Supernova remnant

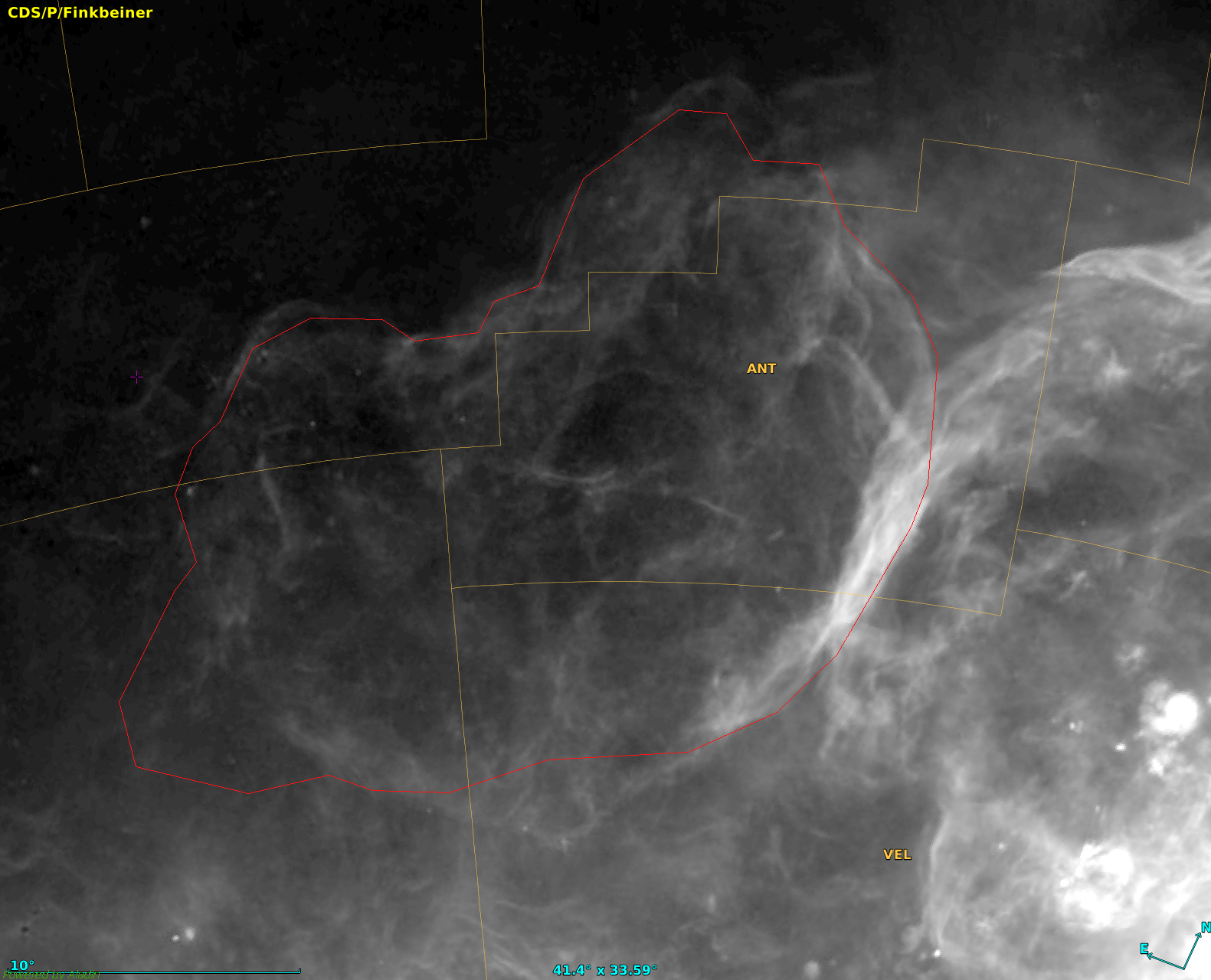
H-alpha image of the Antlia SNR via SHASSA survey data. The approximate extent of the remnant is marked in red, along with constellation boundaries.

The Antlia supernova remnant is a large nearby supernova remnant (SNR) covering the constellation Antlia and parts of Vela, Centaurus and Hydra. This cloud of expanding gas appears about 24 degrees across, three times wider than the Vela supernova remnant. Its distance is uncertain, with estimates ranging from ~100 to 300 parsecs (300–1,000 light years). This would correspond to a physical diameter of several hundred light years. It is thus the closest known SNR besides the Local Bubble, a large cavity in the interstellar medium resulting from multiple ancient supernovae, which contains our own solar system.

The Antlia SNR was first identified in 2002 from its X-ray and hydrogen-alpha emissions. At that time, it was tentatively linked with the pulsar PSR B0950+08. A 2013 study suggested PSR J0630−2834 as a more plausible candidate. But a 2021 study of optical and ultraviolet observations estimates the age of the remnant at less than 100,000 years, making any association with these much older pulsars unlikely. That study also provided evidence that the Antlia SNR is colliding with the even wider Gum Nebula to its south-west.
