= BF Antliae =

Star in the constellation Antlia

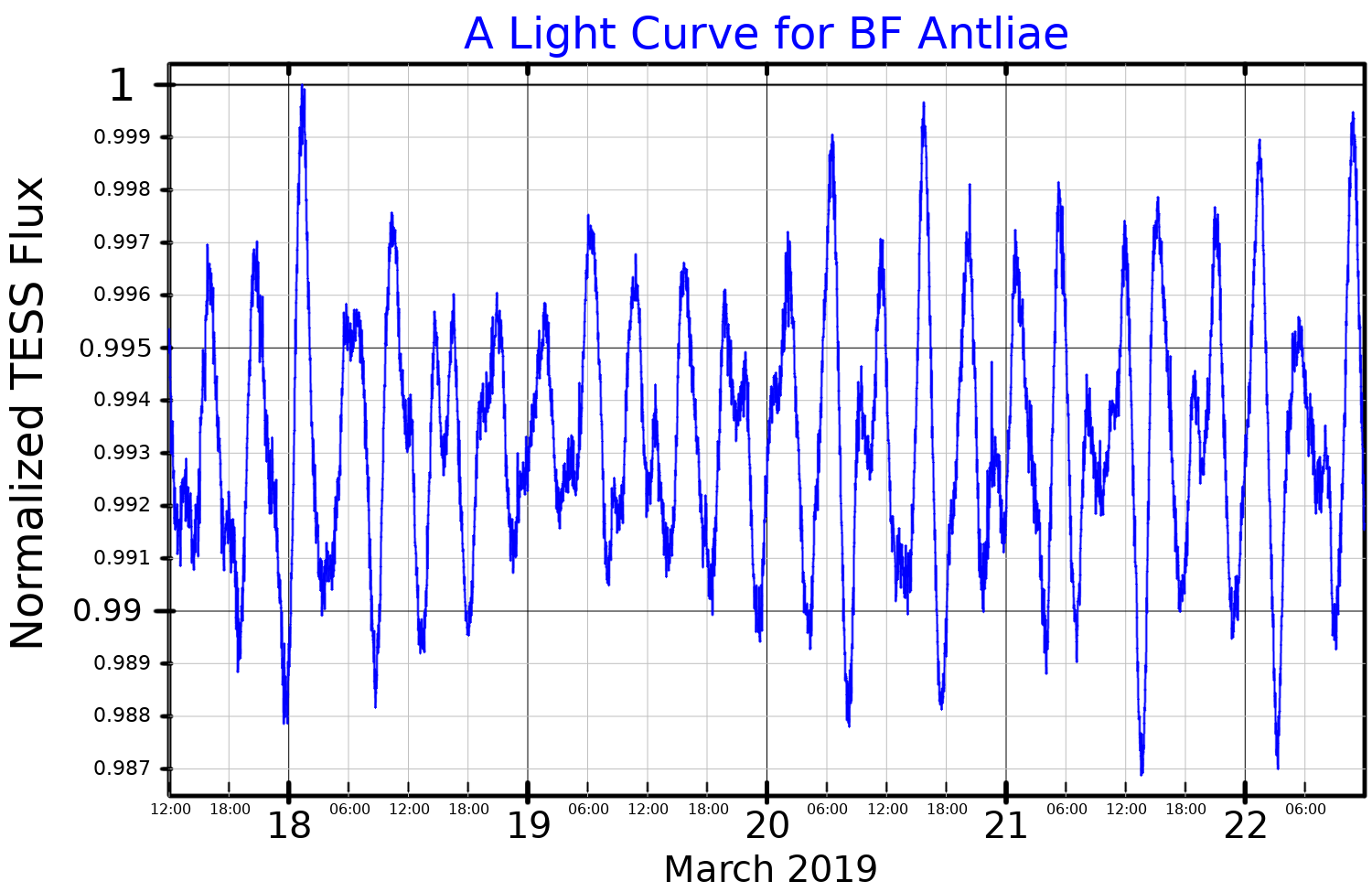
- A light curve for BF Antliae, plotted from TESS data

Observation data Epoch J2000 Equinox ICRS
- Constellation: Antlia
- Right ascension: 09^{h} 56^{m} 54.09215^{s}
- Declination: −27° 28′ 30.5575″
- Apparent magnitude (V): 6.32 (+0.01)

Characteristics
- Spectral type: A4 V
- B−V color index: 0.173±0.008
- Variable type: δ Sct

Astrometry
Radial velocity (R_{v})	+18.2±0.8 km/s
Proper motion (μ)	RA: −72.627 mas/yr Dec.: +23.234 mas/yr
Parallax (π)	6.8977±0.0578 mas
Distance	473 ± 4 ly (145 ± 1 pc)
Absolute magnitude (M_{V})	0.33

Details
Mass	2.41±0.05 M_{☉}
Luminosity	66.8+11.7 −10.0 L_{☉}
Temperature	7,745+53 −71 K
Rotational velocity (v sin i)	218.9±1.7 km/s

Other designations
- BF Ant, CD−26°7551, HD 86301, HIP 48776, HR 3933, SAO 178216

Database references
SIMBAD	data

BF Antliae, or HD 86301, is a variable star in the southern constellation of Antlia. It has a baseline apparent visual magnitude of 6.32, which indicates it lies near the lower limit of naked eye visibility for faint stars. The distance to BF Ant, as determined from its annual parallax shift of 6.9 mas, is 473 light years. It is moving further away with a heliocentric radial velocity of +18 km/s.

In 2002, Gerald Handler and Robert R. Shobbrook discovered that the brightness of the star varies. It was given its variable star designation, BF Antliae, in 2006. It is an A-type main-sequence star with a stellar classification of A4 V that is at the end of its main sequence lifespan. It is a Delta Scuti variable that varies by 0.01 of a magnitude. These are short-period (six hours at most) pulsating stars that have been used as standard candles and as subjects to study astroseismology. Handler and Shobbrook noted that the star lies near the "hot luminous border of the δ Scuti instability strip", and it appears "multiperiodic with a time scale of 3.8–6 hours".

BF Antliae is spinning rapidly with a projected rotational velocity of 219 km/s. It has 2.41 times the mass of the Sun and is radiating 67 times the Sun's luminosity from its photosphere at an effective temperature of 7,745 K.
