= HR 4339 =

Star in the constellation Hydra

Observation data Epoch J2000.0 Equinox ICRS
- Constellation: Hydra
- Right ascension: 11^{h} 09^{m} 53.39376^{s}
- Declination: −32° 22′ 03.0986″
- Apparent magnitude (V): 5.79

Characteristics
- Evolutionary stage: main sequence
- Spectral type: A1V
- B−V color index: 0.027±0.005

Astrometry
Radial velocity (R_{v})	+1.3±0.5 km/s
Proper motion (μ)	RA: +18.454 mas/yr Dec.: −29.966 mas/yr
Parallax (π)	8.9232±0.0816 mas
Distance	366 ± 3 ly (112 ± 1 pc)
Absolute magnitude (M_{V})	+0.38

Details
Mass	2.61±0.06 M_{☉}
Radius	3.1 R_{☉}
Luminosity	72.1+7.8 −7.0 L_{☉}
Surface gravity (log g)	3.83 cgs
Temperature	9,120+127 −215 K
Rotational velocity (v sin i)	73 km/s
Age	439 Myr

Other designations
- Beta Antliae, NSV 5111, BD−31°8816, HD 97023, HIP 54561, HR 4339, SAO 202149

Database references
SIMBAD	data

HR 4339 is a single star in the equatorial constellation of Hydra. It was designated as Beta Antliae by Lacaille, and Gould intended to keep it in that constellation. However, the delineating of constellation boundaries by the IAU in 1930 saw it transferred to Hydra. It has a white hue and is just visible to the naked eye with an apparent visual magnitude of 5.79. The distance to this star, as determined from parallax measurements, is approximately 366 light-years. It is drifting further away with a radial velocity of +1.3 km/s.

This object is an A-type main-sequence star with a stellar classification of A1V. It is a suspected variable star of unknown type and magnitude. The star has 2.6 times the mass of the Sun and it is spinning with a projected rotational velocity of 73 km/s. It is radiating around 72 times the luminosity of the Sun from its photosphere at an effective temperature of 9,120 K.
