= Zeta1 Antliae =

Binary star system in the constellation Antlia

Zeta^{1} Antliae
- Location of ζ^{1} Antliae (circled)

Observation data Epoch J2000 Equinox ICRS
- Constellation: Antlia
- ζ^{1} Ant A
- Right ascension: 09^{h} 30^{m} 46.100^{s}
- Declination: −31° 53′ 21.12″
- Apparent magnitude (V): 6.20
- ζ^{1} Ant B
- Right ascension: 09^{h} 30^{m} 45.759^{s}
- Declination: −31° 53′ 28.01″
- Apparent magnitude (V): 7.01

Characteristics
- Spectral type: A0 V + A2 V
- U−B color index: +0.05
- B−V color index: +0.05

Astrometry

ζ^{1} Ant A
Radial velocity (R_{v})	−2.9±0.9 km/s
Proper motion (μ)	RA: +18.767 mas/yr Dec.: −22.778 mas/yr
Parallax (π)	9.5729±0.0419 mas
Distance	341 ± 1 ly (104.5 ± 0.5 pc)

ζ^{1} Ant B
Proper motion (μ)	RA: +20.517 mas/yr Dec.: −21.314 mas/yr
Parallax (π)	9.6052±0.0282 mas
Distance	339.6 ± 1.0 ly (104.1 ± 0.3 pc)

Details

ζ^{1} Ant A
Mass	2.46 M_{☉}
Radius	2.26 R_{☉}
Luminosity	39.8 L_{☉}
Surface gravity (log g)	4.1 cgs
Temperature	9,641 K
Rotational velocity (v sin i)	204 km/s

ζ^{1} Ant B
Mass	2.23 M_{☉}
Radius	1.74 R_{☉}
Luminosity	16.9 L_{☉}
Surface gravity (log g)	4.3 cgs
Temperature	8,872 K
Rotational velocity (v sin i)	50 km/s

Other designations
- CD−31°7355, HIP 46657, PPM 286548, CCDM 09308-3153
- ζ^{1} Ant A: GC 13137, HD 82384, HR 3781, SAO 200445
- ζ^{1} Ant B: GC 13135, HD 82383, HR 3780, SAO 200444

Database references
SIMBAD	ζ^{1} Ant A
- ζ^{1} Ant B

Zeta^{1} Antliae is a binary star system in the southern constellation of Antlia. Its Bayer designation is Latinized from ζ^{1} Antliae, and abbreviated Zet^{1} Ant or ζ^{1} Ant, respectively. Based upon parallax measurements, the pair are located at a distance of roughly 340 light-years (100 parsecs) from Earth. They have apparent magnitudes of +6.20 and +7.01 and have an angular separation of 8.042 arcseconds. The combined apparent magnitude of the system is +5.76, which is bright enough to be seen with the naked eye in suitably dark skies.

The two system components A and B are both A-type main sequence stars; which means they are hotter, larger, and more luminous than the Sun. The primary is spinning rapidly and the secondary more slowly. The primary has 2.46 times the mass of the Sun and 2.26 times the Sun's radius. It is radiating 39.8 times the Sun's net luminosity from its photosphere at an effective temperature of 9,641 K. The secondary 2.23 times the mass and 1.74 times the first of the Run. It shines with 16.9 times the luminosity of the Sun at 8,872 K.
