= Zeta2 Antliae =

Star in the constellation Antlia

Zeta^{2} Antliae
- Location of ζ^{2} Antliae (circled)

Observation data Epoch J2000 Equinox ICRS
- Constellation: Antlia
- Right ascension: 09^{h} 31^{m} 32.155^{s}
- Declination: −31° 52′ 18.52″
- Apparent magnitude (V): 5.91

Characteristics
- Spectral type: A9 IV
- U−B color index: +0.16
- B−V color index: +0.23

Astrometry
Radial velocity (R_{v})	+19.8±1.6 km/s
Proper motion (μ)	RA: −46.727 mas/yr Dec.: −9.036 mas/yr
Parallax (π)	8.8101±0.0593 mas
Distance	370 ± 2 ly (113.5 ± 0.8 pc)
Absolute magnitude (M_{V})	+0.44

Details
Mass	1.71 M_{☉}
Radius	4.22 R_{☉}
Luminosity	49.5 L_{☉}
Surface gravity (log g)	3.42 cgs
Temperature	7,455 K

Other designations
- ζ^{2} Antliae, Zet^{2} Ant, ζ^{2} Ant, CD−31 7369, HD 82513, HIP 46734, HR 3789, SAO 200459, PPM 286565

Database references
SIMBAD	data

Zeta^{2} Antliae is a star in the southern constellation of Antlia, the air pump. Its Bayer designation is Latinized from ζ^{2} Antliae, and abbreviated Zet^{2} Ant or ζ^{2} Ant, respectively. With an apparent visual magnitude of 5.91, it is a relatively faint star that requires dark suburban skies for viewing with the naked eye. Parallax measurements show it to be located at a distance of approximately 370 light-years (110 parsecs) from Earth. The star is receding with a heliocentric radial velocity of +20 km/s.

The spectrum of this star matches a stellar classification of A9 IV, where the luminosity class of IV indicates that this is a subgiant star that is evolving away from the main sequence as the supply of hydrogen at its core is becoming exhausted. This is catalogued as an Am star, which means it is a chemically peculiar star that shows strong indications of certain trace metals in its spectrum. However, the chemical peculiarity is now considered doubtful. The star has 1.7 times the mass and 4.2 times the radius of the Sun. It is radiating 49.5 times the luminosity of the Sun from its photosphere at an effective temperature of 7,455 K.
