= NGC 3256 =

Galaxy in the constellation Vela

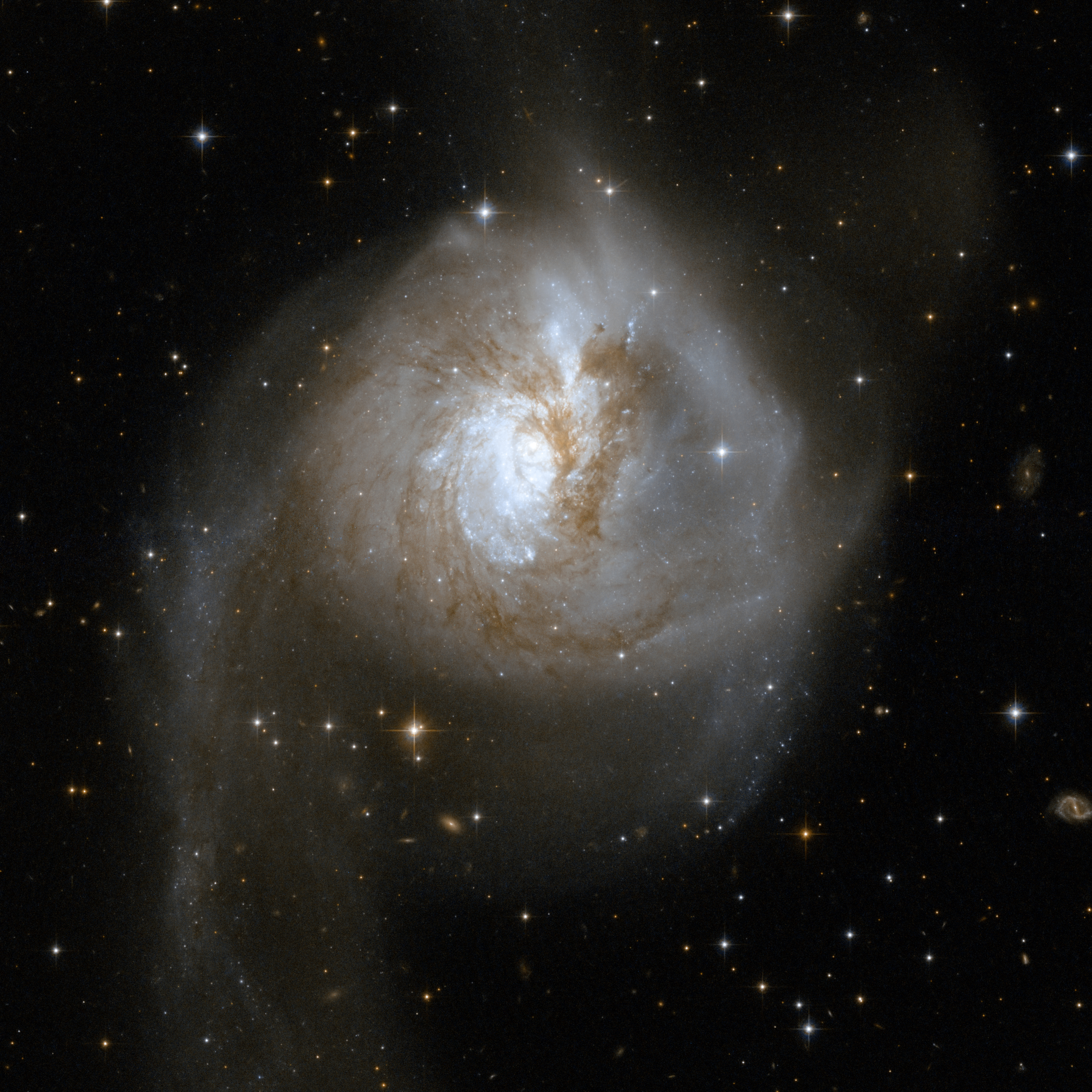
- NGC 3256 imaged by the Hubble Space Telescope

Observation data (J2000 epoch)
- Constellation: Vela
- Right ascension: 10^{h} 27^{m} 51.0300^{s}
- Declination: −43° 54′ 18.200″
- Redshift: 0.009354 +/- 0.000019
- Heliocentric radial velocity: 2,804 ± 6 km/s
- Distance: 122 Mly (37.4 Mpc)
- Apparent magnitude (V): 12.15

Characteristics
- Type: Pec
- Size: ~390,300 ly (119.67 kpc) (estimated)
- Apparent size (V): 3.8′ × 2.1′
- Notable features: Galaxy merger, starburst galaxy

Other designations
- ESO 263-IG 038, AM 1025-433, IRAS 10257-4338, MCG -07-22-010, PGC 30785, VV 65

NGC 3256 is a peculiar galaxy formed from the collision of two separate galaxies in the constellation of Vela. NGC 3256 is located about 122 million light-years away and belongs to the Hydra–Centaurus Supercluster complex. It was discovered by British astronomer John Herschel on 3 February 1835.

NGC 3256 provides a nearby template for studying the properties of young star clusters in tidal tails. The system hides a double nucleus and a tangle of dust lanes in the central region. The telltale signs of the collision are two extended luminous tails swirling out from the galaxy. The tails are studded with a particularly high density of star clusters. NGC 3256 is the most luminous galaxy in the infrared spectrum located within z 0.01 from Earth.

== Supernovae ==
Four supernovae have been observed in NGC 3256:

- SN 2001db (Type II, mag. 16.3) was discovered by R. Maiolino, M. Della Valle, L. Vanzi, and F. Mannucci on 9 January 2001.
- SN 2018ec (Type Ic, mag. 15.1) was discovered by Supernovae UNmasked By Infra-Red Detection (SUNBIRD) on 3 January 2018.
- SN 2021afuq (Type Ic, mag. 16) was discovered by ASAS-SN on 2 December 2021.
- SN 2025qgd (Type II, mag. 16.438) was discovered by ATLAS on 29 June 2025.

== Characteristics ==
=== Nuclei ===
NGC 3256 has double nuclei: the northern and southern nucleus, separated by 5", which at the distance of NGC 3256 corresponds to 850 pc. The nuclei are clearly visible in radiowaves and mid infrared, but the southern nucleus is hidden by dust lanes at the optical spectrum. The two nuclei will coalesce as the merger proceeds to its final stage. Lipari et al. note the presence of a third nucleus based on the presence of an obscured knot detected only at wavelengths λ ≥ 3.75 μm, which they suggest is a nuclear HII region.

There is evidence of an outflow of ionised gas from the northern nucleus with shocks which is attributed to a superwind powered by the starburst. Based on observations by Spitzer Space Telescope, and Chandra X-ray Observatory, Ohyana et al. suggested that the southern nucleus of NGC 3256 is a heavily absorbed low luminosity active galactic nucleus, with X-ray spectrum consistent with a typical Compton-thin Seyfert 2 galaxy.

=== HII regions ===
Although NGC 3256 has seven large H II regions, a number small in comparison with other interacting galaxies, they are very luminous, with a total flux 85 times that of the Tarantula Nebula and they could host super star clusters. The HII regions coincide with X-ray emission regions, with possible sources being supernova remnants and X-ray binaries, which suggests the sources are in clusters with massive stars which may be initially embedded in HII regions. The HI mass of these features suggests they could be progenitors of globular clusters.

=== Tidal tails ===
NGC 3256 features two tidal tails. The two tails account for approximately 75% of the HI emission of the galaxy, which, however, includes a central absorption feature. Michael Rubrock et al. found that the two tails have different colors, suggesting different stellar populations. The eastern tail has mean stellar population age determined to be 841^{+125}_{−157} Myr and a larger percentage of mass belonging to the stellar population that was formed before the galaxy interaction. In the eastern tail were also detected several young (< 10 Myr), low mass objects with strong nebular emission, indicating a small, recent burst of star formation. The mean stellar population of the western tail was estimated to be 288^{+11}_{−54} Myr and its light is dominated by stars formed after the interaction. The tails feature large numbers of star clusters, especially the western tail.

== Nearby galaxies ==
NGC 3256 belongs to a small group of galaxies which includes also the tidally disrupted NGC 3263 and NGC 3256C and roughly 15 more galaxies, as well as HI fragments. Some researchers have considered that NGC 3256 and NGC 3263 form two different groups but they are difficult to distinguish from each other spatially and two different group-finding algorithms applied to the same data catalogued the same galaxies in different groups. Among the features of the NGC 3256 group is a galaxy-sized intergalactic HI cloud known as the Vela Cloud, which as seen from Earth is not clearly associated with an individual galaxy but appears to be part of the group.

The NGC 3256 group belongs to the Hydra–Centaurus Supercluster.

== Gallery ==
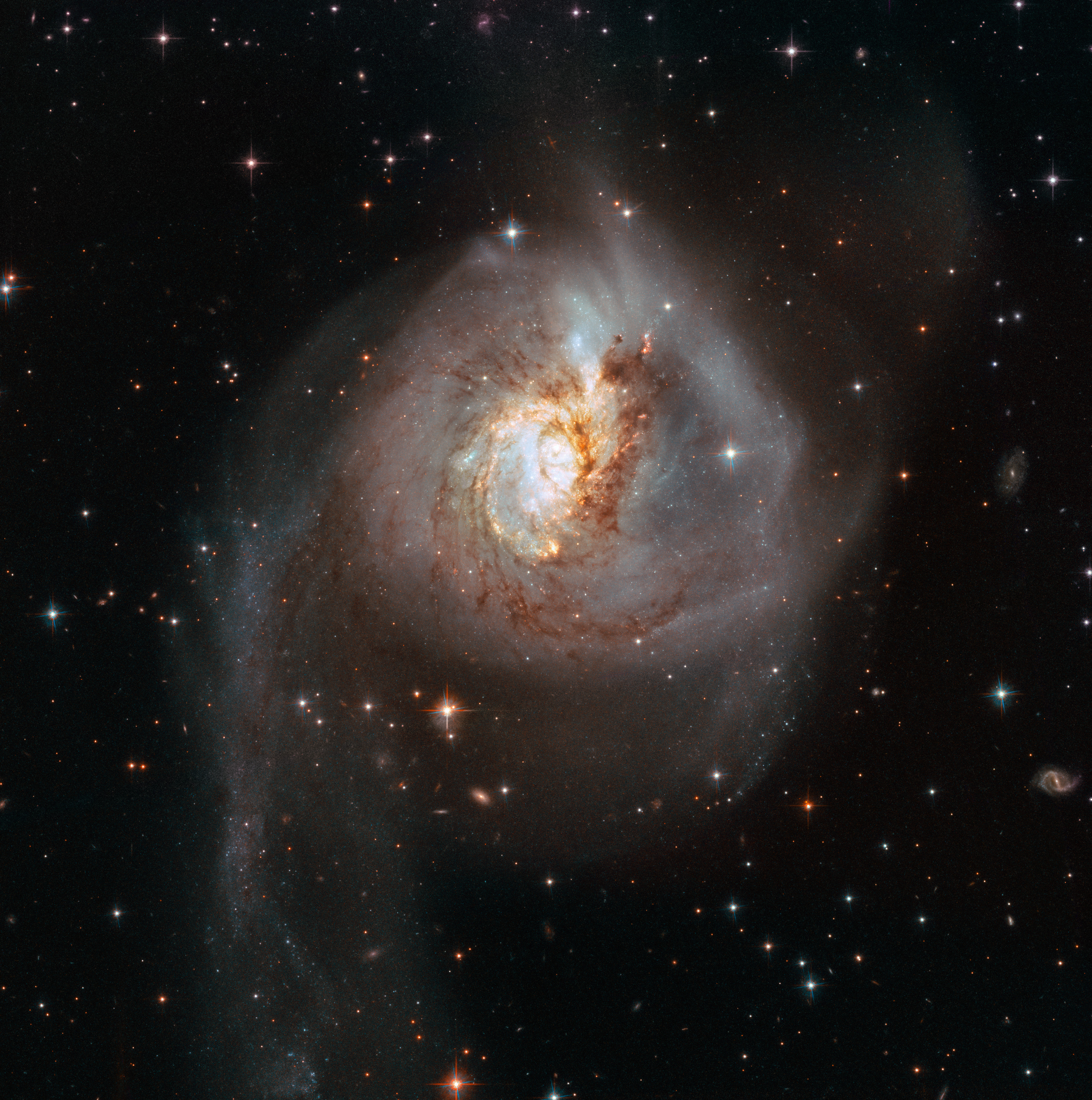
NGC 3256 taken with the Wide Field Camera 3 and the Advanced Camera for Surveys.

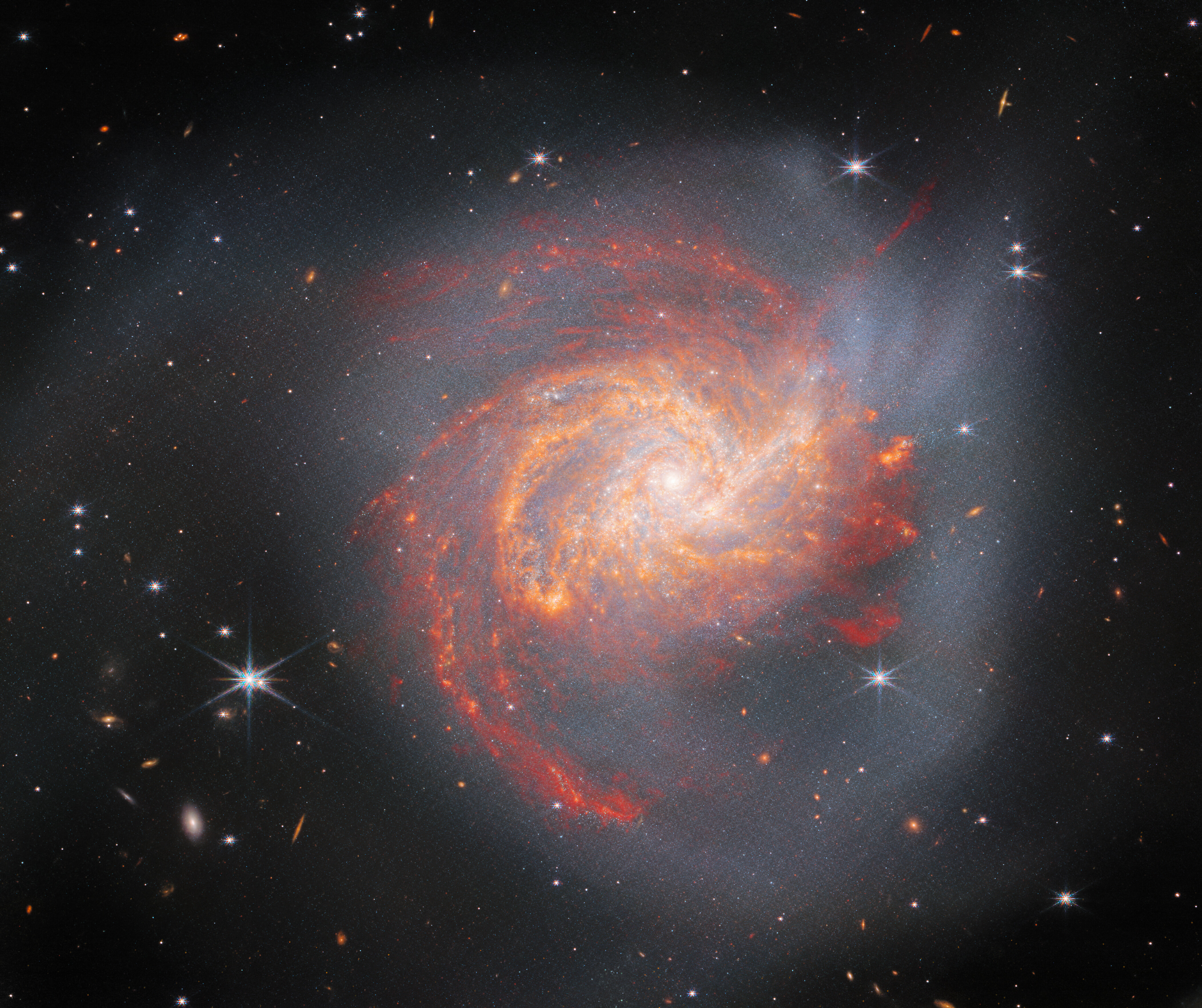
The peculiar galaxy NGC 3256 dominates this image from the NASA/ESA/CSA James Webb Space Telescope.

== See also ==
- NGC 6240 - a nearby ultraluminous infrared galaxy
- Arp 220 - another ultraluminous infrared galaxy and merger remnant
- List of NGC objects (3001–4000)
