= Antlia =

Constellation in the Southern Celestial Hemisphere

- Constellation
- List of stars in Antlia
- Abbreviation: Ant
- Genitive: Antliae
- Pronunciation: /ˈæntliə/, genitive /-lii/
- Symbolism: the Air Pump
- Right ascension: 09^{h} 27^{m} 05.1837^{s}–11^{h} 05^{m} 55.0471^{s}
- Declination: −24.5425186°–−40.4246216°
- Area: 239 sq. deg. (62nd)
- Main stars: 3
- Bayer/Flamsteed stars: 9
- Stars brighter than 3.00^{m}: 0
- Stars within 10.00 pc (32.62 ly): 2
- Brightest star: α Ant (4.25^{m})
- Nearest star: DENIS J1048−3956
- Messier objects: 0
- Meteor showers: None
- Bordering constellations: Hydra; Pyxis; Vela; Centaurus
- Visible at latitudes between +45° and −90°. Best visible at 21:00 (9 p.m.) during the month of April.

Antlia (/ˈæntliə/; from Ancient Greek ἀντλία) is a constellation in the Southern Celestial Hemisphere. Its name means "pump" in Latin and Greek; it represents an air pump. Originally Antlia Pneumatica, the constellation was established by Nicolas-Louis de Lacaille in the 18th century. Its non-specific (single-word) name, already in limited use, was preferred by John Herschel then welcomed by the astronomic community which officially accepted this. North of stars forming some of the sails of the ship Argo Navis (the constellation Vela), Antlia is completely visible from latitudes south of 49 degrees north.

Antlia is a faint constellation; its brightest star is Alpha Antliae, an orange giant that is a suspected variable star, ranging between apparent magnitudes 4.22 and 4.29. S Antliae is an eclipsing binary star system, changing in brightness as one star passes in front of the other. Sharing a common envelope, the stars are so close they will one day merge to form a single star. Two star systems with known exoplanets, HD 93083 and WASP-66, lie within Antlia, as do NGC 2997, a spiral galaxy, and the Antlia Dwarf Galaxy.

== History ==
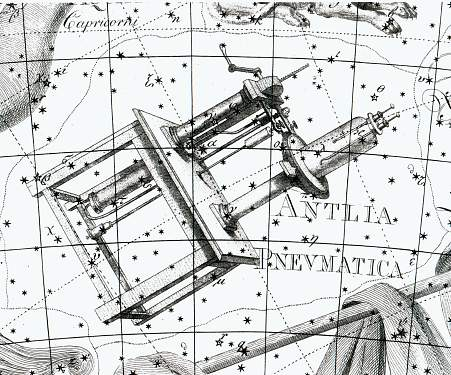
Johann Bode's depiction of Antlia as a double-cylinder air pump

The French astronomer Nicolas-Louis de Lacaille first described the constellation in French as la Machine Pneumatique (the Pneumatic Machine) in 1751–52, commemorating the air pump invented by the French physicist Denis Papin. De Lacaille had observed and catalogued almost 10,000 southern stars during a two-year stay at the Cape of Good Hope, devising fourteen new constellations in uncharted regions of the Southern Celestial Hemisphere not visible from Europe. He named all but one in honour of instruments that symbolised the Age of Enlightenment. (Note: The exception is Mensa, named for the Table Mountain. The other thirteen (alongside Antlia) are Caelum, Circinus, Fornax, Horologium, Microscopium, Norma, Octans, Pictor, Pyxis, Reticulum, Sculptor and Telescopium.) Lacaille depicted Antlia as a single-cylinder vacuum pump used in Papin's initial experiments, while German astronomer Johann Bode chose the more advanced double-cylinder version. Lacaille Latinised the name to Antlia pneumatica on his 1763 chart. English astronomer John Herschel proposed shrinking the name to one word in 1844, noting that Lacaille himself had abbreviated his constellations thus on occasion. This was universally adopted. The International Astronomical Union adopted it as one of the 88 modern constellations in 1922.

Although visible to the Ancient Greeks, Antlia's stars were too faint to have been commonly recognised as a figurative object, or part of one, in ancient asterisms. The stars that now comprise Antlia are in a zone of the sky associated with the asterism/old constellation Argo Navis, the ship, the Argo, of the Argonauts, in its latter centuries. This, due to its immense size, was split into hull, poop deck and sails by Lacaille in 1763. Ridpath reports that due to their faintness, the stars of Antlia did not make up part of the classical depiction of Argo Navis.

=== In non-Western astronomy ===
Chinese astronomers were able to view what is modern Antlia from their latitudes, and incorporated its stars into two different constellations. Several stars in the southern part of Antlia were a portion of "Dong'ou", which represented an area in southern China. Furthermore, Epsilon, Eta, and Theta Antliae were incorporated into the celestial temple, which also contained stars from modern Pyxis.

== Characteristics ==
Covering 238.9 square degrees and hence 0.579% of the sky, Antlia ranks 62nd of the 88 modern constellations by area. Its position in the Southern Celestial Hemisphere means that the whole constellation is visible to observers south of 49°N. (Note: Although parts of the constellation technically rise above the horizon to observers between the 49°N and 65°N, stars within a few degrees of the horizon are to all intents and purposes unobservable.) Hydra the sea snake runs along the length of its northern border, while Pyxis the compass, Vela the sails, and Centaurus the centaur line it to the west, south and east respectively. The three-letter abbreviation for the constellation, as adopted by the International Astronomical Union, is "Ant". The official constellation boundaries, as set by Belgian astronomer Eugène Delporte in 1930, (Note: Delporte had proposed standardising the constellation boundaries to the International Astronomical Union, who had agreed and gave him the lead role) are defined by a polygon with an east side, south side and ten other sides (facing the two other cardinal compass points) (illustrated in infobox at top-right). In the equatorial coordinate system, the right ascension coordinates of these borders lie between 09^{h} 26.5^{m} and 11^{h} 05.6^{m} , while the declination coordinates are between −24.54° and −40.42°.

== Features ==
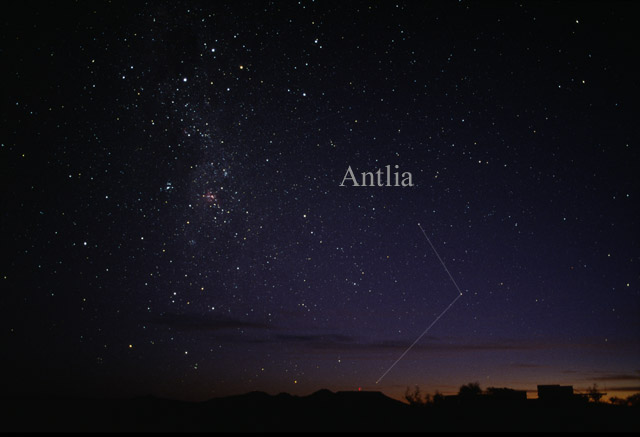
The constellation Antlia as seen by the naked eye

=== Stars ===
Lacaille gave nine stars Bayer designations, labelling them Alpha through to Theta, combining two stars next to each other as Zeta. Gould later added a tenth, Iota Antliae. Beta and Gamma Antliae (now HR 4339 and HD 90156) ended up in the neighbouring constellation Hydra once the constellation boundaries were delineated in 1930. Within the constellation's borders, there are 42 stars brighter than or equal to apparent magnitude 6.5. (Note: Objects of magnitude 6.5 are among the faintest visible to the unaided eye in suburban-rural transition night skies.) The constellation's two brightest stars—Alpha and Epsilon Antliae—shine with a reddish tinge. Alpha is an orange giant of spectral type K4III that is a suspected variable star, ranging between apparent magnitudes 4.22 and 4.29. It is located 320 ± 10 light-years away from Earth. Estimated to be shining with around 480 to 555 times the luminosity of the Sun, it is most likely an ageing star that is brightening and on its way to becoming a Mira variable star, having converted all its core fuel into carbon. Located 590 ± 30 light-years from Earth, Epsilon Antliae is an evolved orange giant star of spectral type K3 IIIa, that has swollen to have a diameter about 69 times that of the Sun, and a luminosity of around 1279 Suns. It is slightly variable. At the other end of Antlia, Iota Antliae is likewise an orange giant of spectral type K1 III. It is 202 ± 2 light-years distant.

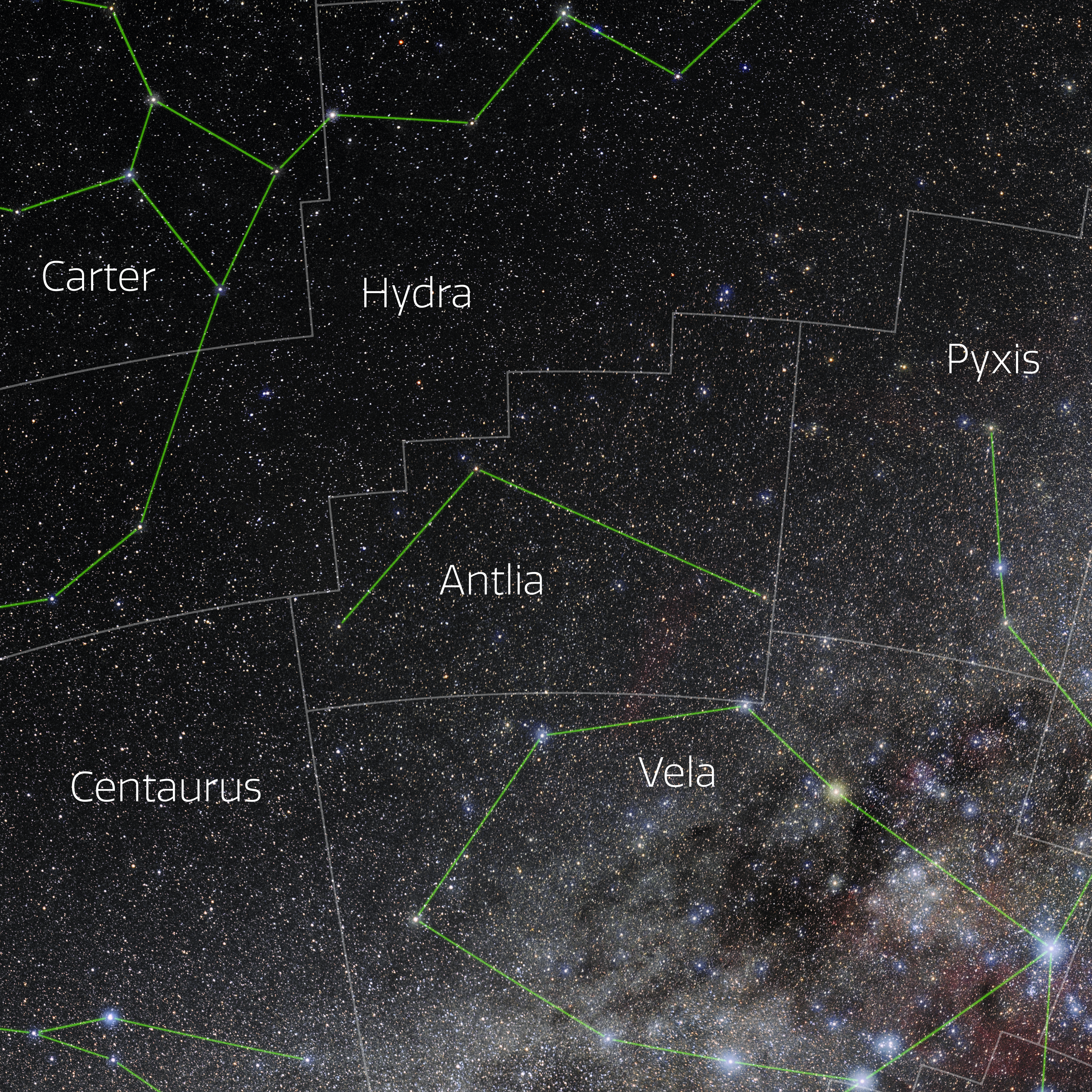
The constellation Antlia showing the IAU boundaries, the stick figure, and the brightest stars labelled. Astrophotography by Eckhard Slawik, from NOIRLab's 88 Constellations project.

Located near Alpha is Delta Antliae, a binary star, 450 ± 10 light-years distant from Earth. The primary is a blue-white main sequence star of spectral type B9.5V and magnitude 5.6, and the secondary is a yellow-white main sequence star of spectral type F9Ve and magnitude 9.6. Zeta Antliae is a wide optical double star. The brighter star—Zeta^{1} Antliae—is 410 ± 40 light-years distant and has a magnitude of 5.74, though it is a true binary star system composed of two white main sequence stars of magnitudes 6.20 and 7.01 that are separated by 8.042 arcseconds. The fainter star—Zeta^{2} Antliae—is 386 ± 5 light-years distant and of magnitude 5.9. Eta Antliae is another double composed of a yellow white star of spectral type F1V and magnitude 5.31, with a companion of magnitude 11.3. Theta Antliae is likewise double, most likely composed of an A-type main sequence star and a yellow giant. S Antliae is an eclipsing binary star system that varies in apparent magnitude from 6.27 to 6.83 over a period of 15.6 hours. The system is classed as a W Ursae Majoris variable—the primary is hotter than the secondary and the drop in magnitude is caused by the latter passing in front of the former. Calculating the properties of the component stars from the orbital period indicates that the primary star has a mass 1.94 times and a diameter 2.026 times that of the Sun, and the secondary has a mass 0.76 times and a diameter 1.322 times that of the Sun. The two stars have similar luminosity and spectral type as they have a common envelope and share stellar material. The system is thought to be around 5–6 billion years old. The two stars will eventually merge to form a single fast-spinning star.

T Antliae is a yellow-white supergiant of spectral type F6Iab and Classical Cepheid variable ranging between magnitude 8.88 and 9.82 over 5.9 days. U Antliae is a red C-type carbon star and is an irregular variable that ranges between magnitudes 5.27 and 6.04. At 910 ± 50 light-years distant, it is around 5819 times as luminous as the Sun. BF Antliae is a Delta Scuti variable that varies by 0.01 of a magnitude. HR 4049, also known as AG Antliae, is an unusual hot variable ageing star of spectral type B9.5Ib-II. It is undergoing intense loss of mass and is a unique variable that does not belong to any class of known variable star, ranging between magnitudes 5.29 and 5.83 with a period of 429 days. It is around 6000 light-years away from Earth. UX Antliae is an R Coronae Borealis variable with a baseline apparent magnitude of around 11.85, with irregular dimmings down to below magnitude 18.0. A luminous and remote star, it is a supergiant with a spectrum resembling that of a yellow-white F-type star but it has almost no hydrogen.

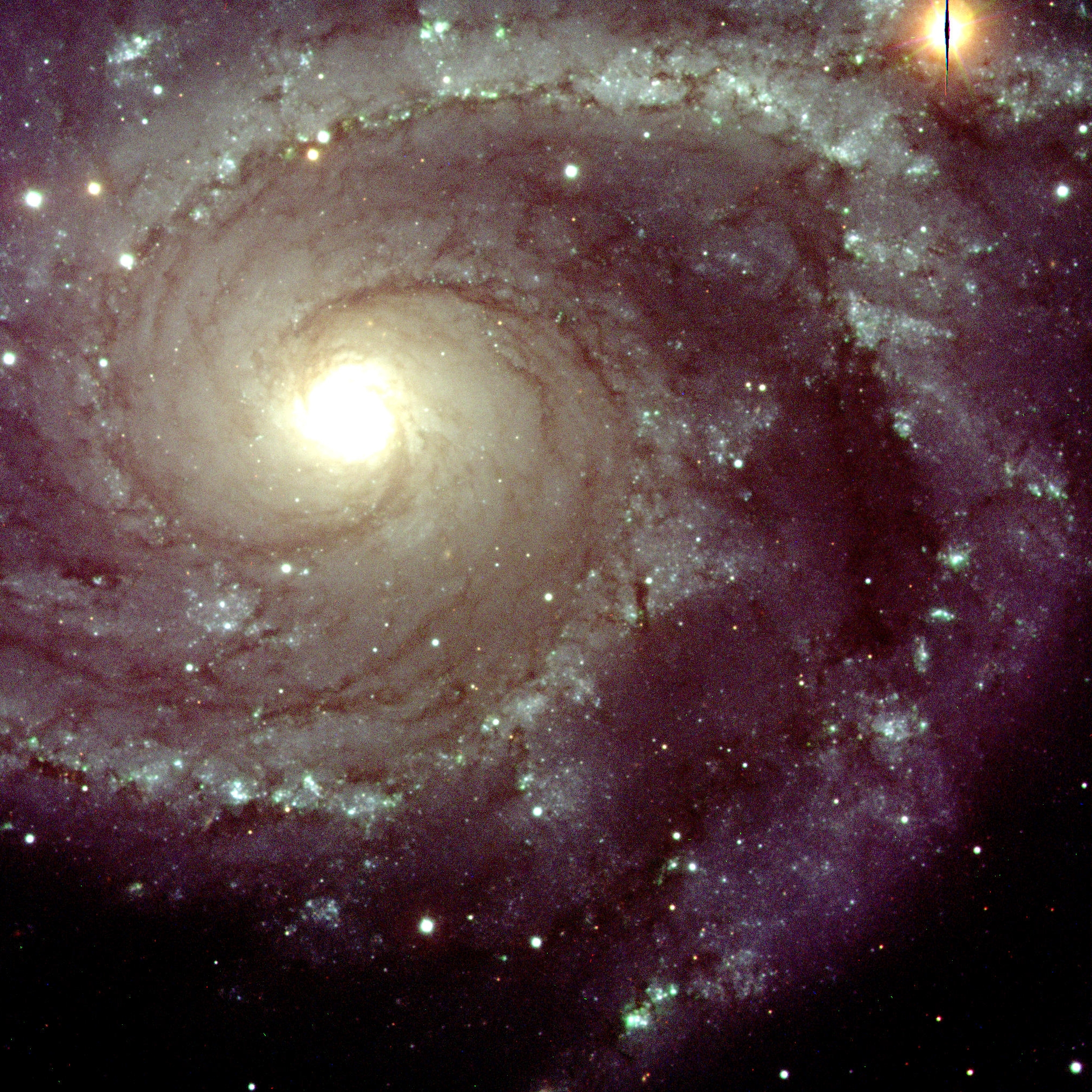
A composite image of NGC 2997

HD 93083 is an orange dwarf star of spectral type K3V that is smaller and cooler than the Sun. It has a planet that was discovered by the radial velocity method with the HARPS spectrograph in 2005. About as massive as Saturn, the planet orbits its star with a period of 143 days at a mean distance of 0.477 AU. WASP-66 is a sunlike star of spectral type F4V. A planet with 2.3 times the mass of Jupiter orbits it every 4 days, discovered by the transit method in 2012. DEN 1048-3956 is a brown dwarf of spectral type M8 located around 13 light-years distant from Earth. At magnitude 17 it is much too faint to be seen with the unaided eye. It has a surface temperature of about 2500 K. Two powerful flares lasting 4–5 minutes each were detected in 2002. 2MASS 0939-2448 is a system of two cool and faint brown dwarfs, probably with effective temperatures of about 500 and 700 K and masses of about 25 and 40 times that of Jupiter, though it is also possible that both objects have temperatures of 600 K and 30 Jupiter masses.

=== Deep-sky objects ===
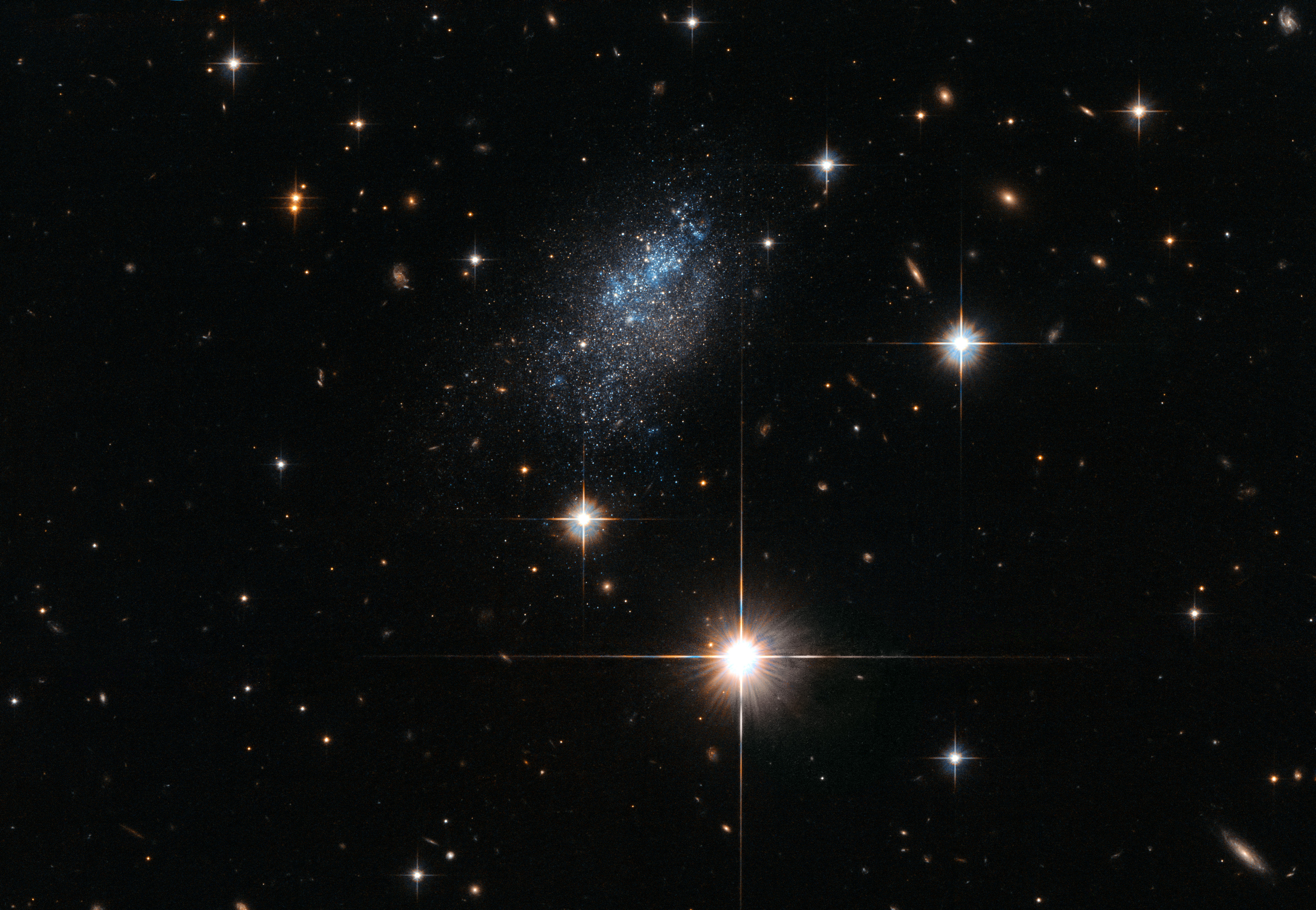
Galaxy ESO 376-16 is located nearly 23 million light-years from Earth.

Antlia contains many faint galaxies, the brightest of which is NGC 2997 at magnitude 10.6. It is a loosely wound face-on spiral galaxy of type Sc. Though nondescript in most amateur telescopes, it presents bright clusters of young stars and many dark dust lanes in photographs. Discovered in 1997, the Antlia Dwarf is a 14.8^{m} dwarf spheroidal galaxy that belongs to the Local Group of galaxies. In 2018 the discovery was announced of a very low surface brightness galaxy near Epsilon Antliae, Antlia 2, which is a satellite galaxy of the Milky Way.

The Antlia Cluster, also known as Abell S0636, is a cluster of galaxies located in the Hydra–Centaurus Supercluster. It is the third nearest to the Local Group after the Virgo Cluster and the Fornax Cluster. The cluster's distance from earth is 40.5 to 40.9 Mpc (132.1 to 133.4 Mly) Located in the southeastern corner of the constellation, it boasts the giant elliptical galaxies NGC 3268 and NGC 3258 as the main members of a southern and northern subgroup respectively, and contains around 234 galaxies in total.

Antlia is home to the huge Antlia Supernova Remnant, one of the largest supernova remnants in the sky.
