= List of stars in Caelum =

This is the list of notable stars in the constellation Caelum, sorted by decreasing brightness.

Name	B	G.	Var	HD	HIP	RA	Dec	vis. mag.	abs. mag.	Dist. (ly)	Sp. class	Notes
α Cae	α	9		29875	21770	04^{h} 40^{m} 33.82^{s}	−41° 51′ 48.9″	4.44	2.92	66	F2IV	binary star; suspected δ Sct variable, V_{max} = 4.44^{m}, V_{min} = 4.47^{m}
γ^{1} Cae	γ^{1}	28		32831	23595	05^{h} 04^{m} 24.31^{s}	−35° 28′ 58.3″	4.55	0.78	185	K2III	binary star
β Cae	β	10		29992	21861	04^{h} 42^{m} 03.45^{s}	−37° 08′ 41.2″	5.04	2.83	90	F3V	
δ Cae	δ	7		28873	21060	04^{h} 30^{m} 50.10^{s}	−44° 57′ 13.5″	5.07	−1.62	710	B2IV-V	Suspected variable star
HD 30080		12		30080	21958	04^{h} 43^{m} 09.31^{s}	−30° 45′ 55.4″	5.66	−1.14	748	K3III	
HD 31093	η^{1} (Note: Labelled Eta^{1} Caeli (η^{1} Cae/η^{1} Caeli) by Bode in his Uranographia Ioannis Elerti Bode uranographia)	19		31093	22573	04^{h} 51^{m} 28.20^{s}	−34° 54′ 22.4″	5.82	1.10	286	A2/A3V	binary star
HD 32515	θ (Note: Labelled Theta Caeli (θ Cae/θ Caeli) by Bode in his Uranographia Ioannis Elerti Bode uranographia)	26		32515	23446	05^{h} 02^{m} 22.81^{s}	−31° 46′ 17.5″	5.92	0.90	329	K2III	
HD 32453	ε (Note: Labelled Epsilon Caeli (ε Cae/ε Caeli) by Bode in his Uranographia Ioannis Elerti Bode uranographia)	25		32453	23377	05^{h} 01^{m} 34.53^{s}	−39° 43′ 05.3″	6.02	0.77	366	G8III	
HD 30432		15		30432	22144	04^{h} 45^{m} 55.50^{s}	−39° 21′ 23.7″	6.04	1.12	315	K1III	
ν Cae	ν	18		30985	22488	04^{h} 50^{m} 16.18^{s}	−41° 19′ 15.6″	6.06	2.47	171	F1III-IV	double star
HD 28454	(χ) (Note: Labelled Chi Horologii (χ Hor/χ Horologii) by Bode in his Uranographia Ioannis Elerti Bode uranographia)	3		28454	20781	04^{h} 27^{m} 05.92^{s}	−46° 56′ 48.6″	6.10	3.54	106	F8V	
HD 31529	π (Note: Labelled Pi Caeli (π Cae/π Caeli) by Bode in his Uranographia Ioannis Elerti Bode uranographia)	22		31529	22847	04^{h} 54^{m} 54.82^{s}	−39° 37′ 43.2″	6.11	−1.35	1012	K3III	
HD 28700		5		28700	20934	04^{h} 29^{m} 20.04^{s}	−46° 30′ 55.3″	6.13	0.73	392	K1III	
λ Cae	λ	13		30202	21998	04^{h} 43^{m} 44.26^{s}	−41° 03′ 53.3″	6.24	−0.27	652	K3/K4III	
HD 32820		27		32820	23555	05^{h} 03^{m} 53.94^{s}	−41° 44′ 43.2″	6.30	3.82	102	F8V	
X Cae	γ^{2}		X	32846	23596	05^{h} 04^{m} 26.14^{s}	−35° 42′ 18.7″	6.32	1.27	334	F2IV/V	δ Sct variable, V_{max} = 6.28^{m}, V_{min} = 6.39^{m}, P = 0.270488 d
ζ Cae	ζ	16		30608	22280	04^{h} 47^{m} 49.56^{s}	−30° 01′ 14.2″	6.35	0.36	513	K0III	
HD 28246		1		28246	20630	04^{h} 25^{m} 19.10^{s}	−44° 09′ 39.8″	6.38	3.54	121	F6V	suspected variable star
HD 29559		8		29559	21525	04^{h} 37^{m} 19.25^{s}	−41° 52′ 23.0″	6.40	1.20	358	A3Vs...	
RV Cae		4	RV	28552	20856	04^{h} 28^{m} 09.48^{s}	−41° 57′ 35.4″	6.41	−1.18	1072	M1III	Semiregular variable, V_{max} = 6.44^{m}, V_{min} = 6.56^{m}
HD 31142	η^{2} (Note: Labelled Eta^{2} Caeli (η^{2} Cae/η^{2} Caeli) by Bode in his Uranographia Ioannis Elerti Bode uranographia)	20		31142	22611	04^{h} 51^{m} 54.19^{s}	―34° 14′ 19.3″	6.68		194	F6IV/V	
HD 28358	ο (Note: Labelled Omicron Caeli (ο Cae/ο Caeli) by Bode in his Uranographia Ioannis Elerti Bode uranographia)	2		28358	20735	04^{h} 26^{m} 37.69^{s}	–40° 31′ 45.9″	6.70		415	A1V	
R Cae			R	29844	21766	04^{h} 40^{m} 30.08^{s}	−38° 14′ 06.92″	6.70	−2.25	1763	M6e	Mira variable, V_{max} = 8.98^{m}, V_{min} = 14.08^{m}
HD 30786				30786	22391	04^{h} 49^{m} 11.75^{s}	−34° 18′ 42.4″	6.81	−1.14	1269	K1III	
HD 30397	ι (Note: Labelled Iota Caeli (ι Cae/ι Caeli) by Bode in his Uranographia Ioannis Elerti Bode uranographia)	14		30397	22136	04^{h} 45^{m} 49.64^{s}	―34° 00′ 18.2″	6.85		663	A0V	
RX Cae	κ (Note: Labelled Kappa Caeli (κ Cae/κ Caeli) by Bode in his Uranographia Ioannis Elerti Bode uranographia)	6	RX	28837	21063	04^{h} 30^{m} 53.32^{s}	―41° 10′ 27.2″	7.02		503	F3/F5II	
HD 29824	ξ (Note: Labelled Xi Caeli (ξ Cae/ξ Caeli) by Bode in his Uranographia Ioannis Elerti Bode uranographia)			29824	21753	04^{h} 40^{m} 14.20^{s}	–38° 48′ 25.2″	7.43		1,004	K2III	
T Cae			T	30593	22247	04^{h} 47^{m} 18.92^{s}	−36° 12′ 33.57″	7.73	−0.87	4,659	C-N4IV	Carbon star and semiregular variable, V_{max} = 7.47^{m}, V_{min} = 791^{m}, P = 158 d
HD 32277				32277	23249	05^{h} 00^{m} 11.71^{s}	−37° 59′ 40.45″	8.99	0.85	1,386	K0III	
HD 30669				30669	22320	04^{h} 48^{m} 28.33^{s}	−28° 25′ 09.9″	9.12	5.42	179	G8/K0V	has a planet (b)
W Cae			W	272494		04^{h} 50^{m} 21.56^{s}	−45° 46′ 50.09″	9.79	1.97	1,195	G7III	Eclipsing binary V_{max} = 9.63^{m}, V_{min} = 9.95^{m}, P = 6.9787 d
S Cae			S			04^{h} 56^{m} 56.48^{s}	−33° 08′ 00.07″	10.71	2.65	1,333	A6V	Eclipsing binary V_{max} = 10.54^{m}, V_{min} = 11.21^{m}, P = 0.482538 d
U Cae			U			04^{h} 53^{m} 14.41^{s}	−37° 49′ 15.92″	12.44	0.8	6930	A9-F0III	RR Lyrae variable, V_{max} = 11.66^{m}, V_{min} = 12.77^{m}
LHS 1678						04^{h} 32^{m} 42.96^{s}	−39° 47′ 27.15″	12.6	11.11	64.8	M2V	Binary system, primary component has three transiting planets (b, c and d)
WASP-159						04^{h} 32^{m} 33.0^{s}	−38° 58′ 06″	12.84	3.52	2,384	F9IV	has a transiting planet (b)
RR Cae			RR			04^{h} 21^{m} 06.0^{s}	−48° 39′ 07″	14.4		69.1	DAZ8+dM	Algol variable; has a planet (b)
Table legend: • Name = Proper name • B = Bayer designation • F or/and G. = Flamsteed designation or Gould designation • Var = Variable star designation • HD = Henry Draper Catalogue designation number • HIP = Hipparcos Catalogue designation number • RA = Right ascension for the Epoch/Equinox J2000.0 • Dec = Declination for the Epoch/Equinox J2000.0 • vis. mag. = visual magnitude (m or m_{v}), also known as apparent magnitude • abs. mag. = absolute magnitude (M_{v}) • Dist. (ly) = Distance in light-years from Earth • Sp. class = Spectral class of the star in the stellar classification system • Notes = Common name(s) or alternate name(s); comments; notable properties [for example: multiple star status, range of variability if it is a variable star, exoplanets, etc.]

== See also ==
- Lists of stars by constellation
