= Gamma Caeli =

The Bayer designation Gamma Caeli (γ Cae, γ Caeli) is shared by two star systems, in the constellation Caelum:

- γ^{1} Caeli
- γ^{2} Caeli

They are separated by 0.22° on the sky.
