= NGC 1570 =

Galaxy in the constellation of Caelum

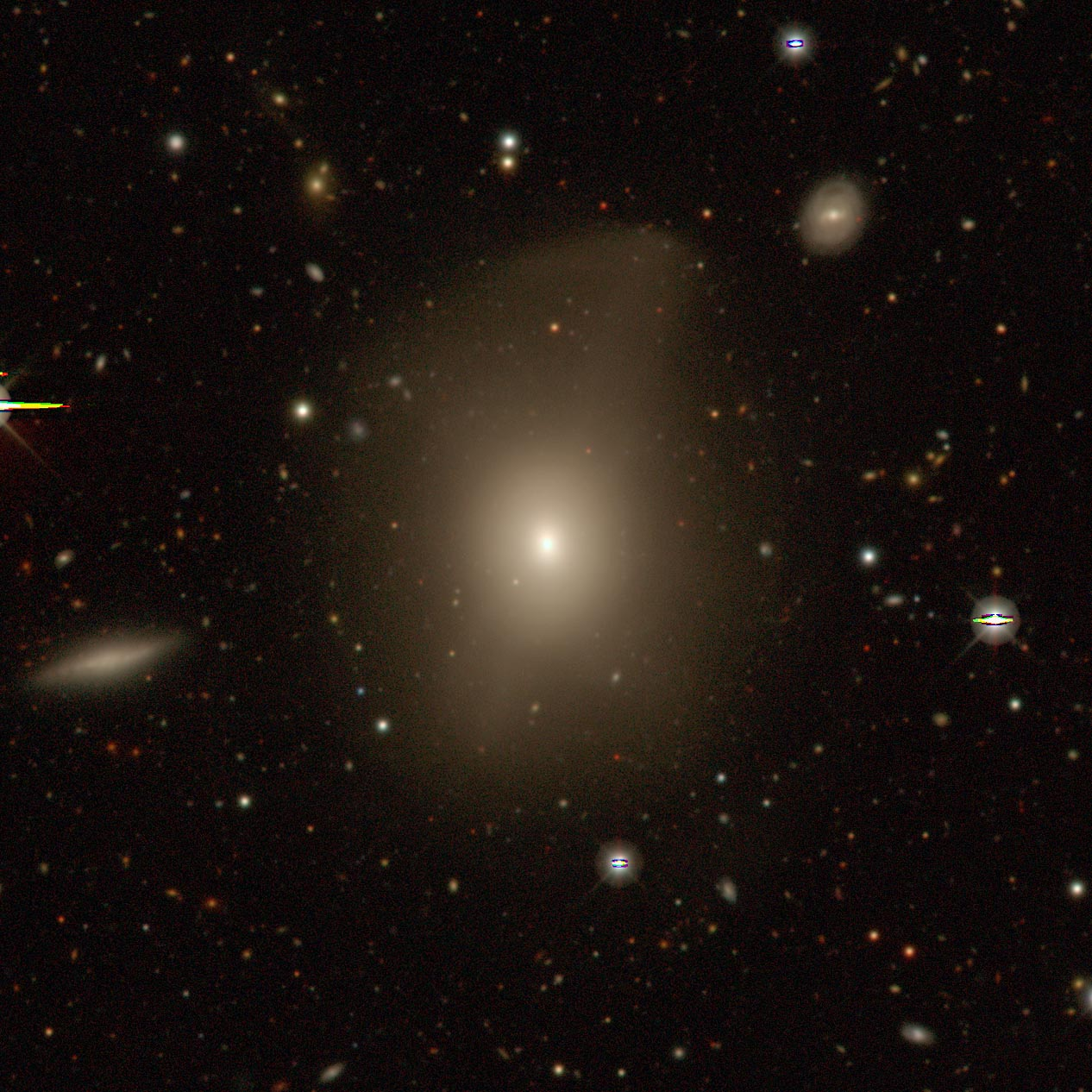
- A legacy surveys image of NGC 1570.

Observation data (J2000.0 epoch)
- Constellation: Caelum
- Right ascension: 04^{h} 22^{m} 08.93282^{s}
- Declination: −43° 37′ 46.4517″
- Redshift: 0.014760
- Heliocentric radial velocity: 4,392±84 km/s
- Distance: 199 Mly (60.9 Mpc)
- Group or cluster: LDC 302
- Apparent magnitude (B): 13.22

Characteristics
- Type: S0
- Mass: 297±149 (black hole) M_{☉}
- Size: 108,000 ly (33,113 pc)
- Apparent size (V): 1.037′ × 0.809′

Other designations
- NGC 1571, LEDA 14971, PGC 14971

NGC 1570, mistakenly called NGC 1571, is a faint galaxy located in the southern constellation Caelum, the chisel. It has a blue magnitude of 13.2, making it visible through a medium sized telescope. Based on a redshift of z = 0.014760, the object is estimated to be 198 million light years (60.9 megaparsecs) away from the Local Group. It appears to be receding with a heliocentric radial velocity of 4,392 km/s.

NGC 1570 has a galaxy morphological classification of S0, indicating that it is a lenticular galaxy. It has also been catalogued as a peculiar elliptical galaxy. The central black hole has a mass 297 times that of the Sun. It is estimated to be 8.9 billion years old, younger than the Milky Way. The average iron abundance of the galaxy is 135% that of the Sun's. NGC 1570 is said to be round in shape, making it more likely to be an elliptical galaxy.

The galaxy was first discovered by Sir John Herschel in November 1835. A month later, he observed NGC 1570 again and mistakenly called it NGC 1571 due to imprecise coordinates. NGC 1570 is part of a small galaxy group called LDC 302. It is the brightest member.
