= NGC 1572 =

Galaxy in the constellation Caelum

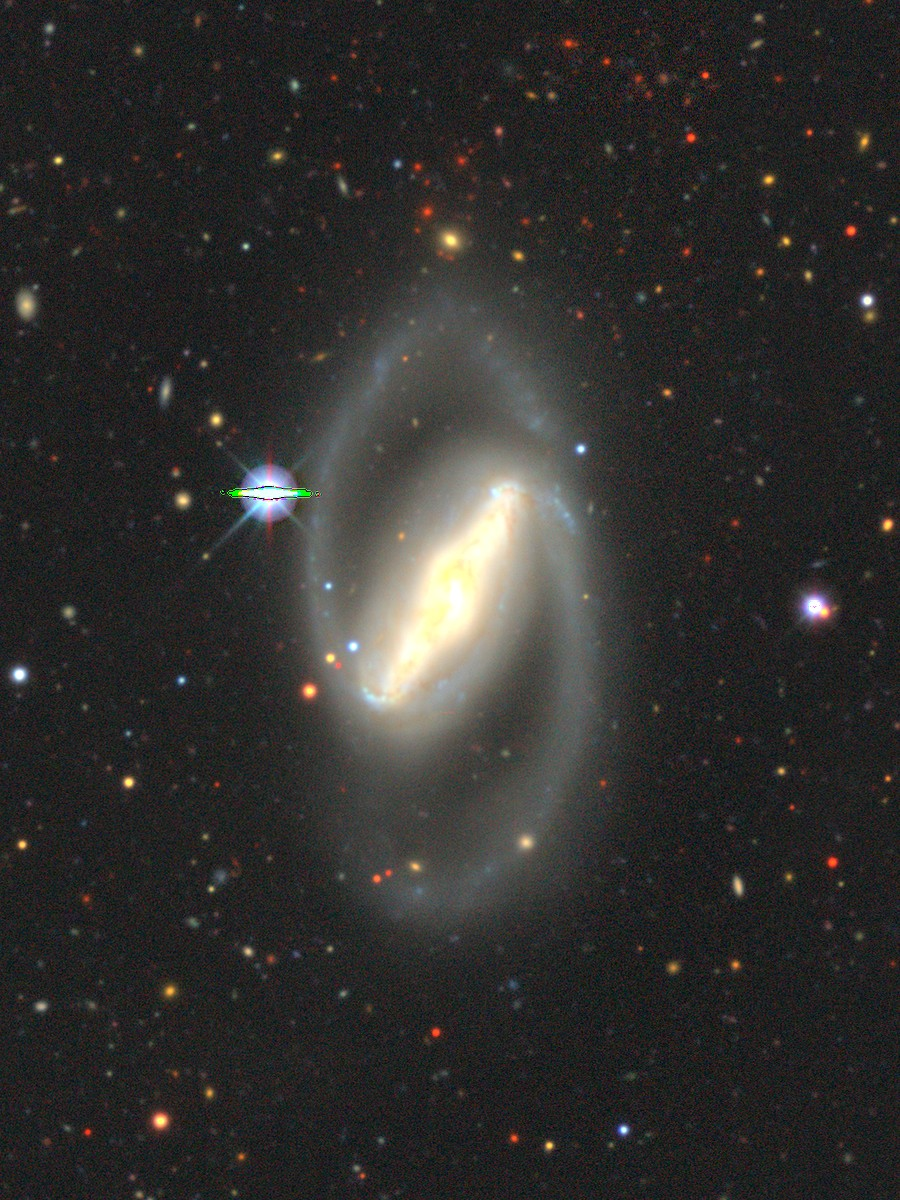
- NGC 1572 imaged by Legacy Surveys

Observation data (J2000 epoch)
- Constellation: Caelum
- Right ascension: 04^{h} 22^{m} 42.8080^{s}
- Declination: −40° 36′ 03.037″
- Redshift: 0.020384±0.0000330
- Heliocentric radial velocity: 6,111±10 km/s
- Distance: 223.69 ± 9.42 Mly (68.583 ± 2.888 Mpc)
- Apparent magnitude (V): 13.26

Characteristics
- Type: (R')SB(s)a
- Size: ~221,400 ly (67.89 kpc) (estimated)
- Apparent size (V): 2.5′ × 1.2′

Other designations
- ESO 303- G 014, IRAS 04210-4042, 2MASX J04224281-4036034, MCG -07-10-003, PGC 14993

NGC 1572 is a large barred spiral galaxy in the constellation of Caelum. Its velocity with respect to the cosmic microwave background is 6,081±10 km/s, which corresponds to a Hubble distance of 292.5 ± 20.5 Mly (89.68 ± 6.28 Mpc). However, six non-redshift measurements give a closer mean distance of 223.69 ± 9.42 Mly (68.583 ± 2.888 Mpc). It was discovered by British astronomer John Herschel on 23 October 1835.

NGC 1572 is a Seyfert II galaxy, i.e. it has a quasar-like nucleus with very high surface brightnesses whose spectra reveal strong, high-ionisation emission lines, but unlike quasars, the host galaxy is clearly detectable.

== Supernova ==
One supernova has been observed in NGC 1572:

- SN 2009la (Type Ia, mag. 15.7) was discovered by Stuart Parker on 12 November 2009, and independently by Berto Monard, on 11 November 2009.

== See also ==
- List of NGC objects (1001–2000)
