= RE 0503−289 =

Hot white dwarf

Observation data Epoch J2000 Equinox J2000
- Constellation: Caelum
- Right ascension: 05^{h} 03^{m} 55.5149^{s}
- Declination: −28° 54′ 34.631″
- Apparent magnitude (V): 13.58

Characteristics
- Spectral type: DOZ

Astrometry
Proper motion (μ)	RA: +76.715 mas/yr Dec.: +72.251 mas/yr
Parallax (π)	7.2332±0.0325 mas
Distance	451 ± 2 ly (138.3 ± 0.6 pc)

Details
Temperature	60,000-80,000 K

Other designations
- WD 0501-289, 2MASS J05035551-2854345, RE J0503-289, MCT 0501-2858

Database references
SIMBAD	data

RE 0503−289 is a hot helium rich (DO type) white dwarf. Optical and UV spectroscopy of this white dwarf gives a range of temperature between 60,000-80,000 Kelvin. It lies in a region of space with a low interstellar hydrogen density and close to another hot DO type white dwarf named RE 0457-281. A large variety of chemical elements have been found, many of which are heavier than the element iron.

RE 0503-289 was the only known DO type white dwarf detected by the ROSAT sky survey.

== Composition ==
The search for the signatures of chemical elements above iron (trans-iron) in RE 0503-289 started with the discovery of gallium (Ga), germanium (Ge), arsenic (As), selenium (Se), krypton (Kr), molybdenum (Mo), tin (Sn), tellurium (Te), iodine (I), zinc (Zn) and xenon (Xe). The white dwarf has carbon abundances of about 1%. strontium (Sr) has also been detected in RE 0503-289.
