= NGC 1616 =

Galaxy in the constellation Caelum

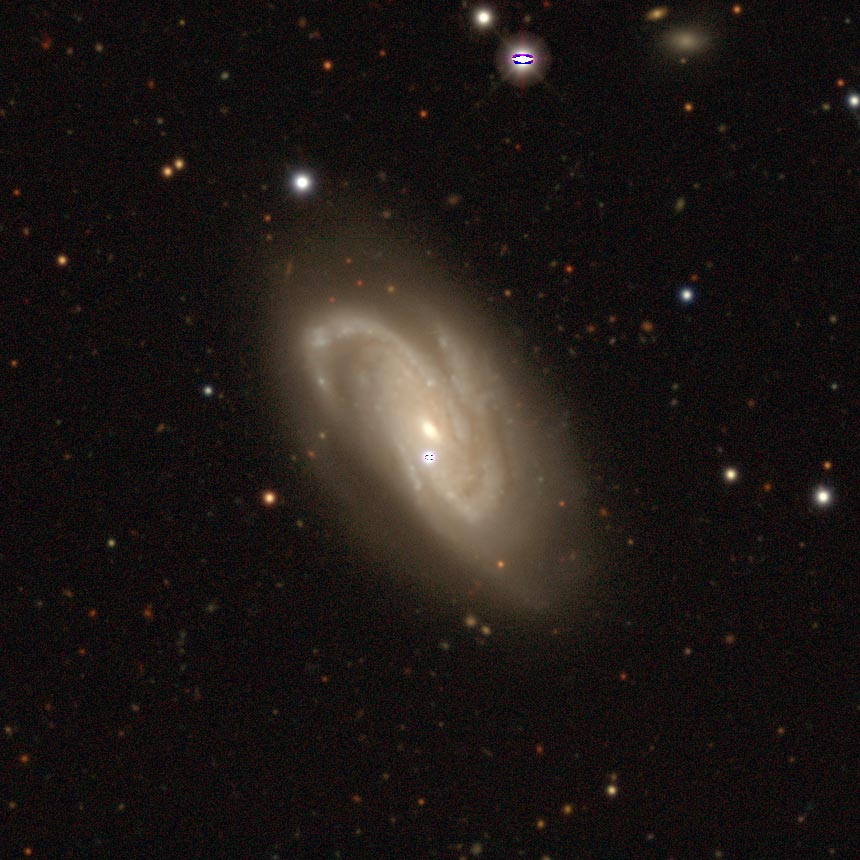
- A Legacy Surveys image of NGC 1616

Observation data (J2000 epoch)
- Constellation: Caelum
- Right ascension: 04^{h} 32^{m} 41.80^{s}
- Declination: −43° 42′ 55.00″
- Redshift: 0.01488±0.000033
- Distance: 213 Mly (65.58 Mpc)
- Apparent magnitude (V): 12.5

Characteristics
- Type: SAB(rs)bc pec?
- Size: 116,000 ly
- Apparent size (V): 1.905′ × 1′
- Notable features: N/A

Other designations
- ESO 251-10, NGC 1616, LEDA 15479, MCG -07-10-013, PGC 15479

NGC 1616 is an intermediate spiral galaxy located around 213 million light-years away in the constellation Caelum. NGC 1616 was discovered on October 24, 1835, by the astronomer John Herschel, and its diameter is 116,000 light-years across. NGC 1616 is not known to have much star-formation, and it is not known to have an active galactic nucleus.
