= HD 31093 =

Visual binary star system in the constellation Caelum

Observation data Epoch J2000 Equinox ICRS
- Constellation: Caelum
- Right ascension: 04^{h} 51^{m} 28.21644^{s}
- Declination: −34° 54′ 22.6341″
- Apparent magnitude (V): 5.83±0.01

Characteristics
- Spectral type: A1V + A4V
- U−B color index: +0.09
- B−V color index: +0.08

Astrometry
Radial velocity (R_{v})	+24±1.8 km/s
Proper motion (μ)	RA: 24.90±0.33 mas/yr Dec.: −22.68±0.48 mas/yr
Parallax (π)	12.17±0.41 mas
Distance	268 ± 9 ly (82 ± 3 pc)
Absolute magnitude (M_{V})	+1.25 (combined)

Orbit
Period (P)	43.36±4.34 yr
Semi-major axis (a)	0.248±0.015″
Eccentricity (e)	0.852
Inclination (i)	107±1°
Longitude of the node (Ω)	20±2°
Argument of periastron (ω) (secondary)	109±2°

Details

HD 31093 A
Mass	1.85 ± 0.21 M_{☉}

HD 31093 B
Mass	1.58 ± 0.18 M_{☉}

Other designations
- 19 G. Caeli, CD−35°1962, CPD−35°551, FK5 2364, GC 5939, HD 31093, HIP 22573, HR 1559, SAO 195357, WDS J04515-3454AB

Database references
SIMBAD	data

HD 31093, also known as HR 1559, is a visual binary located in the southern constellation Caelum, the chisel. The components have a combined apparent magnitude of 5.83, making it faintly visible to the naked eye. Based on parallax measurements from the Hipparcos spacecraft, the system is estimated to be 268 light years distant. They appear to be receding from the Solar System with a heliocentric radial velocity of 24 km/s.

This star was designated Eta^{1} Caeli by Johann Elert Bode in his 1801 Urnaographia, but this is now no longer used.

The components have stellar classifications of A1 and A4 V, indicating that both of them are A-type main-sequence stars. Since the components have a separation of 1/4 arcseconds, it is difficult to distinguish individually through a telescope. The primary has a mass 1.85 times that of the Sun while the secondary has a mass of 1.58 M_{☉}. They take 43 years to circle each other in an eccentric orbit.
