= LHS 1678 =

Astrometric binary system in the constellation Caelum

Observation data Epoch J2000 Equinox J2000
- Constellation: Caelum
- Right ascension: 04^{h} 32^{m} 42.635^{s}
- Declination: −39° 47′ 12.15″
- Apparent magnitude (V): 12.482

Characteristics

A
- Evolutionary stage: Red dwarf
- Spectral type: M2V
- Apparent magnitude (B): 13.5
- Apparent magnitude (R): 11.533
- Apparent magnitude (G): 9.02
- Apparent magnitude (H): 8.501
- Apparent magnitude (K): 8.264
- B−V color index: 1.018

B
- Evolutionary stage: Possible brown dwarf, maybe a jovian planet

Astrometry
Radial velocity (R_{v})	10.94±0.28 km/s
Total velocity	94.6±0.4 km/s
Proper motion (μ)	RA: +239.368 mas/yr Dec.: −967.597 mas/yr
Parallax (π)	50.34±0.02 mas
Distance	64.79 ± 0.03 ly (19.865 ± 0.008 pc)

Orbit
Primary	A
Name	B
Period (P)	42 or 100 years
Semi-major axis (a)	17 or 100 mas (36 or 210 AU) (Note: Calculated using a=d×a_{mas}, with d being the distance and a_{mas} being the angular semi-major axis.)

Details

A
Mass	0.345±0.014 M_{☉}
Radius	0.329±0.01 R_{☉}
Luminosity	0.0145±0.0003 L_{☉}
Temperature	3490±50 K
Metallicity [Fe/H]	−0.36±0.06 dex
Rotation	66±22 d
Age	4.22±0.87 or 4–9 Gyr

Other designations
- TOI-696, LHS 1678, LTT 2022, TIC 77156829, 2MASS J04324261-3947112, WISEA J043242.84-394722.1, Gaia DR2 4864160624337973248, Gaia DR3 4864160624337973248

Database references
SIMBAD	data
Exoplanet Archive	data
ARICNS	data

LHS 1678 (TOI-696) is an astrometric binary star system, located about 65 light-years (19.9 parsecs) from the Earth in the constellation Caelum. It is made up of a red dwarf and a companion star whose nature is still uncertain, but is likely to be a brown dwarf. The red dwarf star is known to host three small, close-in exoplanets.

== Characteristics ==
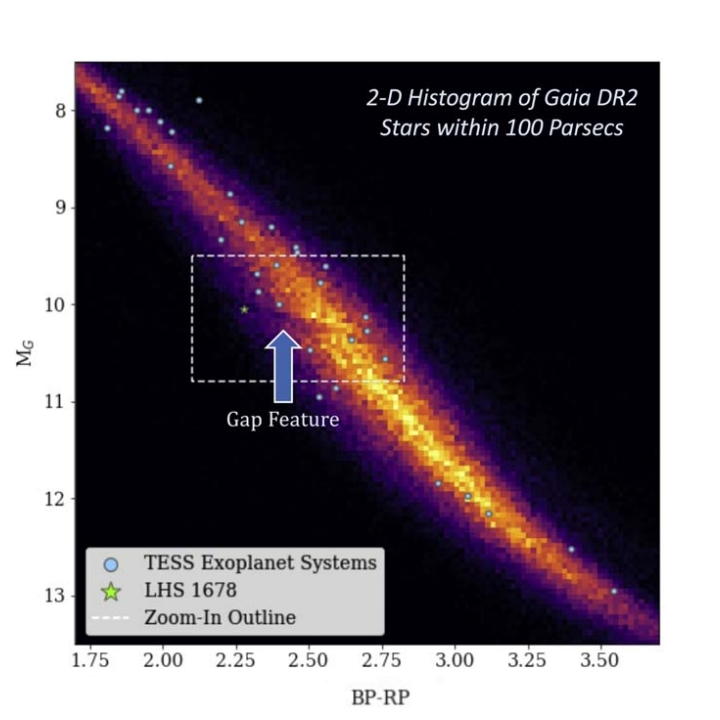
The position of LHS 1678 in the HR diagram

LHS 1678 is a binary star, more precisely an astrometric binary. It is made up of a red dwarf star and a likely brown dwarf star. They are sometimes called LHS 1678 A and B, respectively. The projected separation of the system, i.e. the observed separation between both stars, is a maximum of 5 astronomical units (750,000,000 km). The orbit is expected to be highly inclined, and the orbital period is on the order of decades, with two possible values of 42 and 100 years, as well as semi-major axes of 36 and 210 AU respectively.

The system is located in the southern celestial hemisphere, within the constellation Caelum. The apparent magnitude is 12.5, which is too faint to be seen to the naked eye or even a small telescope. Gaia DR3 provides a parallax of 50.34 mas to LHS 1678, which translates into a distance of 19.86 pc (64.8 ly) to the system. LHS 1678 is moving away from Earth at a velocity of 10.9 km/s. The system has a high proper motion: from 1983 to 2022, it moved 0.5 arcminutes across the sky.

=== LHS 1678 A ===
The primary component of the system is a red dwarf star (spectral type M3V, sometimes called LHS 1678 A) which has 0.345 times the mass and 0.329 times the Sun's radius. It has a surface effective temperature of 3,490 K (3,220 °C), which is significantly cooler than the Sun, (Note: The Sun's effective temperature is 5772 K for reference.) and is emitting a luminosity equivalent to 1.45% of the solar luminosity. LHS 1678 A is metal-poor compared to the Sun, with an abundance of iron equivalent to 44% of the solar level. Its rotational period is 66±22 d (the Sun's rotational period is 24.5 days for reference), and its age is estimated to be 4.22 billion years. It hosts three exoplanets orbiting it which are smaller than Earth.

Nearest stars to LHS 1678
Name	Distance (light-years)
Alpha Caeli	3.3
UPM J0448-3539	5.9
L 147-6	6
CD-34 1770	7.5
UPM J0415-4602	8

LHS 1678 A occupies an unusual position in the HR diagram. It is located in a narrow position in the diagram, characterized by a gap in the lower main sequence. This gap, which can be more accurately described as a deficit of stars, is associated with a transition from partially convective interiors to fully convective interiors in red dwarfs.

The star has little variability in its brightness, no signs of starspots or stellar flares have been found during two months of observations. It also shows no signs of magnetic activity.

=== LHS 1678 B ===
The secondary companion is a probable brown dwarf, sometimes called LHS 1678 B, that has been detected through long-baseline astrometry from RECONS. Observations from the Very Large Telescope's NaCo adaptive optics rule out any companion with a mass larger than 70 M_{J} at a projected separation larger than 5 astronomical units. The companion has been not observed directly. It may be instead a Jovian planet, but the astrometric monitoring data indicates that it is likely a brown dwarf. The possibility of the companion to be a white dwarf is ruled out by the astrometry and radial velocity of the system. It is more likely in or below the hydrogen burning limit, but is nature remains uncertain.

The nearest star to the system is Alpha Caeli, at a distance of 3.3 light-years. Alpha Caeli is also the brightest star in Caelum.

== Planetary system ==
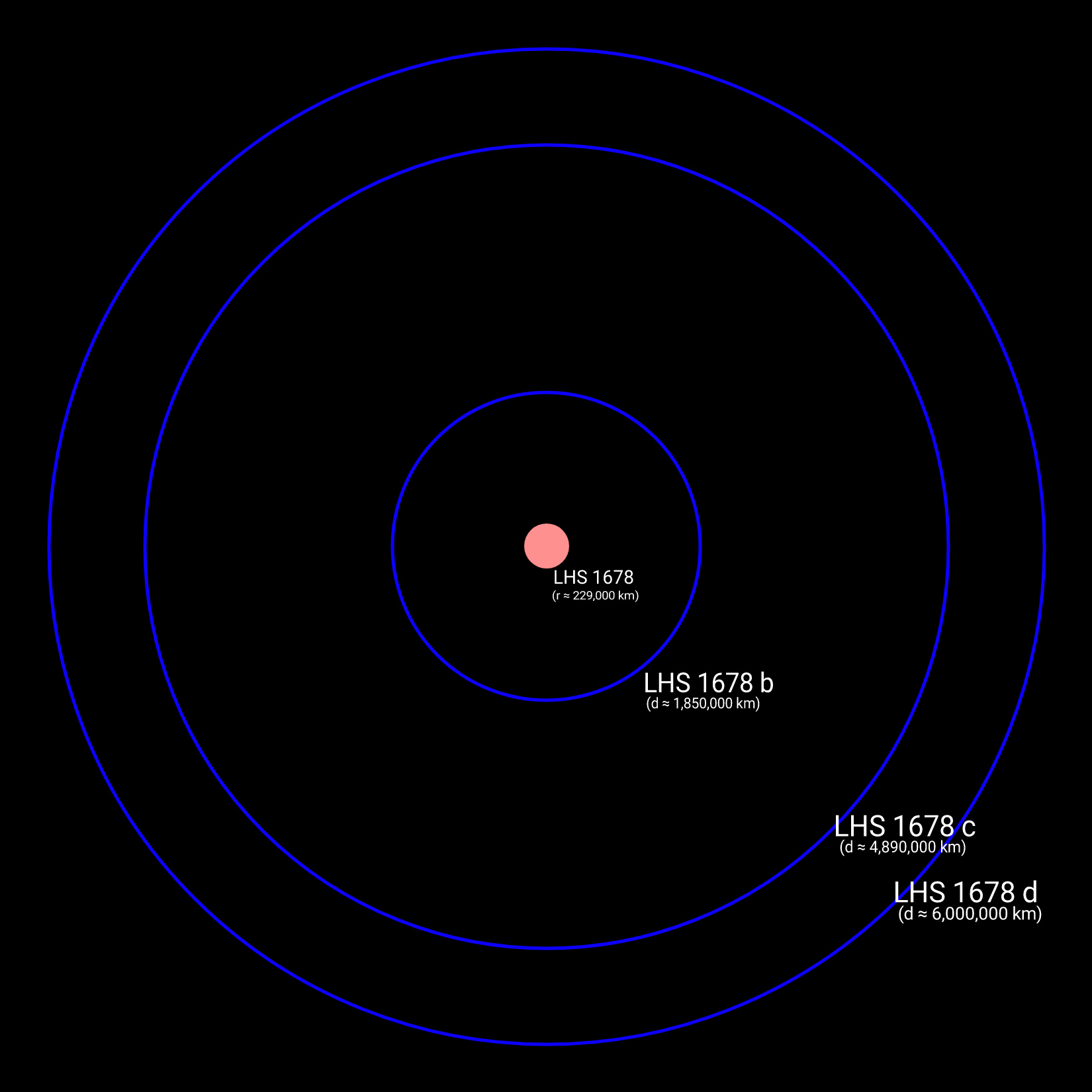
The orbits of the planets around LHS 1678

The red dwarf LHS 1678 hosts three exoplanets, which are smaller than Earth and were discovered by the transit method. The first exoplanets discovered were LHS 1678 b and c, discovered by Silverstein et al. 2022, which also announced the existence of a third possible exoplanet. This planet was later confirmed in 2024, and received the designation LHS 1678 d.

All planets are close to their host star: LHS 1678 b, c and d have orbital periods of about 21 hours, 3.7 and 5 days respectively. LHS 1678 c and d are close to a 4:3 orbital resonance, meaning that for every four orbits completed by LHS 1678 c, LHS 1678 d completes three orbits. Orbital resonances in planetary systems are occasionally linked to transit-timing variations, but no transit-timing variations were detected during a 3-year span.

The masses of the planets have been not measured, but future high-quality radial velocity measurements might measure their masses. Estimates of 0.26+0.14
−0.1 M_{🜨}, 0.81+0.55
−0.29 M_{🜨} and 0.92+0.66
−0.34 M_{🜨} for the planets b, c and d were placed using the forecaster procedure, with large margins of error.

LHS 1678 planetary system
Name	Mass (M_{🜨})	Radius (R_{🜨})	Semi-major axis (AU)	Orbital period (days)	Eccentricity	Inclination	Flux (S_{🜨})
b	0.26+0.14 −0.1	0.685+0.037 −0.035	0.01239+0.00056 −0.00057	0.86	0.033+0.035 −0.023	88.53+1.02 −1.14	94.3+9.1 −8.1
c	0.81+0.55 −0.29	0.941+0.051 −0.05	0.0327±0.0015	3.694	0.039+0.040 −0.025	88.82+0.40 −0.26	13.5+1.3 −2.1
d	0.92+0.66 −0.34	0.981+0.07 −0.072	0.04+0.0018 −0.0017	4.965	0.036+0.06 −0.027	88.31+0.14 −0.13	9.1+0.9 −0.8
