= HD 28700 =

Star in the constellation Caelum

Observation data Epoch J2000.0 Equinox ICRS
- Constellation: Caelum
- Right ascension: 04^{h} 29^{m} 20.0860^{s}
- Declination: −46° 30′ 54.974″
- Apparent magnitude (V): 6.12±0.01

Characteristics
- Evolutionary stage: red giant branch
- Spectral type: K1 III
- B−V color index: +1.06

Astrometry
Radial velocity (R_{v})	10.7±0.4 km/s
Proper motion (μ)	RA: +51.283 mas/yr Dec.: +36.503 mas/yr
Parallax (π)	8.4964±0.0265 mas
Distance	384 ± 1 ly (117.7 ± 0.4 pc)
Absolute magnitude (M_{V})	+0.69

Details
Mass	3.0 M_{☉}
Radius	10.5 R_{☉}
Luminosity	56±2 L_{☉}
Surface gravity (log g)	2.61 cgs
Temperature	4,760±90 K
Metallicity [Fe/H]	+0.08 dex
Rotational velocity (v sin i)	<1 km/s
Age	377 Myr

Other designations
- 5 G. Caeli, CD−46°1427, CPD−46°433, GC 5485, HD 28700, HIP 20934, HR 1433, SAO 216832

Database references
SIMBAD	data

HD 28700 (HR 1433) is a solitary star in the southern constellation Caelum. It has an apparent magnitude of 6.12, making it visible to the naked eye under ideal conditions. Parallax measurements place the object at a distance of 384 light years and is currently receding with a heliocentric radial velocity of 10.7 km/s.

HD 28700 has a stellar classification of K1 III, indicating that it is a red giant. It has three times the Sun's mass and has expanded to ten times its radius. It radiates at 56 times the Sun's luminosity from its swollen photosphere at an effective temperature of 4,760 K, giving it an orange hue. HD 28700 has a projected rotational velocity too low to be measured accurately due to it being less than 1 km/s. HD 28700 has 120% the abundance of iron relative to the Sun. At a modeled age of 377 million years, HD 28700 is on the red giant branch fusing hydrogen in a shell around an inert helium core.
