= HD 30432 =

Star in the constellation of Caelun

Observation data Epoch J2000.0 Equinox ICRS
- Constellation: Caelum
- Right ascension: 04^{h} 45^{m} 55.45152^{s}
- Declination: −39° 21′ 23.8094″
- Apparent magnitude (V): 6.04±0.01

Characteristics
- Evolutionary stage: red giant branch
- Spectral type: K1 III
- B−V color index: +1.07

Astrometry
| Radial velocity (R_{v}) | −6±4.3 km/s |
| Proper motion (μ) | RA: −59.362 mas/yr Dec.: −20.031 mas/yr |
| Parallax (π) | 10.5049±0.0202 mas |
| Distance | 310.5 ± 0.6 ly (95.2 ± 0.2 pc) |
| Absolute magnitude (M_{V}) | +1.10 |

Details
| Mass | 2.80±0.04 M_{☉} |
| Radius | 9.55^{+0.68}_{−0.64} R_{☉} |
| Luminosity | 38.9±1.8 L_{☉} |
| Surface gravity (log g) | 2.76 cgs |
| Temperature | 4,758±122 K |
| Metallicity [Fe/H] | −0.08 dex |
| Rotational velocity (v sin i) | <1.3 km/s |
| Age | 455^{+45}_{−46} Myr |

Other designations
- 15 G. Caeli, CD−39°1624, CPD−39°514, FK5 2355, GC 5821, HD 30432, HIP 22144, HR 1526, SAO 195278

Database references
| SIMBAD | data |

HD 30432, also known as HR 1526, is a solitary, orange hued star located in the southern constellation of Caelum, the chisel. It has an apparent magnitude of 6.04, making it faintly visible to the naked eye if viewed under ideal conditions. Based on parallax measurements from the Gaia spacecraft, the object is estimated to be 310 light years distant. It appears to be approaching the Solar System, having a fairly constrained radial velocity of −6 km/s. Eggen (1993) lists it as a member of the old disk population.

HD 30432 has a stellar classification of K1 III, indicating that it is an evolved giant star. It is currently on the red giant branch, fusing a hydrogen shell around an inert helium core. It has 2.8 times the mass of the Sun and is estimated to be 455 million years old. At that age, the star has expanded to 9.5 times the radius of the Sun and now has a cool effective temperature of 4,758 K. Despite the low temperature, HD 30432 shines with a luminosity 39 times that of the Sun from its photosphere. It has a metallicity 16% below solar levels, making it slightly metal deficient. Like most giants, HR 1526 spins slowly, with its projected rotational velocity being lower than 1.3 km/s.
