= HD 29559 =

Star in the constellation Caelum

Observation data Epoch J2000 Equinox J2000
- Constellation: Caelum
- Right ascension: 04^{h} 37^{m} 19.2681^{s}
- Declination: −41° 52′ 22.596″
- Apparent magnitude (V): 6.40±0.01

Characteristics
- Evolutionary stage: main sequence
- Spectral type: A5 IV-V
- B−V color index: +0.15

Astrometry
Radial velocity (R_{v})	24.2±0.8 km/s
Proper motion (μ)	RA: +25.296 mas/yr Dec.: +49.716 mas/yr
Parallax (π)	7.9974±0.0193 mas
Distance	407.8 ± 1.0 ly (125.0 ± 0.3 pc)
Absolute magnitude (M_{V})	+1.03

Details
Mass	2.19±0.04 M_{☉}
Radius	3.17±0.08 R_{☉}
Luminosity	35±3 L_{☉}
Surface gravity (log g)	3.7±0.1 cgs
Temperature	7,852±36 K
Metallicity [Fe/H]	−0.01 dex
Rotational velocity (v sin i)	176±5 km/s
Age	719 Myr

Other designations
- 8 G. Caeli, CD−42°1572, CPD−42°507, GC 5653, HD 29559, HIP 21525, SAO 216899

Database references
SIMBAD	data

HD 29559 is a solitary star in the southern constellation Caelum. It has an apparent magnitude of 6.40, placing it near the max naked eye visibility. The star is situated at a distance 408 light years based on parallax measurements but is receding with a heliocentric radial velocity of 24.2 km/s.

HD 29559 has a stellar classification of A5 IV-V — a luminosity class intermediate between a main sequence star and subgiant. It has alternatively been classified as A3 Vs:, indicating that it is an A-type main-sequence star with sharp (narrow) absorption lines due to slow rotation. However, there is uncertainty behind the class.

It has 2.19 times the mass of the Sun and a slightly enlarged diameter of 3.17 R_{☉}. It radiates at 35 times the luminosity of the Sun from its photosphere at an effective temperature of 7,852 K, which gives it a white hue. Contrary to the second classification, HD 29559 spins rapidly with a projected rotational velocity of 176 km/s and has a solar metallicity. It is estimated to be 719 million years old, having completed 85.9% of its main sequence lifetime.
