= HD 32453 =

Star in the constellation Caelum

Observation data Epoch J2000.0 Equinox J2000.0 (ICRS)
- Constellation: Caelum
- Right ascension: 05^{h} 01^{m} 34.5224^{s}
- Declination: −39° 43′ 04.967″
- Apparent magnitude (V): 6.01±0.01

Characteristics
- Evolutionary stage: red giant branch
- Spectral type: G8 III
- B−V color index: +0.88

Astrometry
Radial velocity (R_{v})	5.52±0.12 km/s
Proper motion (μ)	RA: −5.335 mas/yr Dec.: +32.895 mas/yr
Parallax (π)	8.0408±0.0210 mas
Distance	406 ± 1 ly (124.4 ± 0.3 pc)
Absolute magnitude (M_{V})	+0.78

Details
Mass	2.40 M_{☉}
Radius	9.73 R_{☉}
Luminosity	50.1 L_{☉}
Surface gravity (log g)	3.18±0.14 cgs
Temperature	5,032±61 K
Metallicity [Fe/H]	−0.02±0.13 dex
Rotational velocity (v sin i)	2±1.4 km/s
Age	700 Myr

Other designations
- CD−39°1744, HD 32453, HIP 23377, HR 1631, SAO 195501

Database references
SIMBAD	data

HD 32453 (HR 1631) is a solitary star located in the southern constellation Caelum. With an apparent magnitude of 6.01, it's barely visible to the naked eye under ideal conditions. This star is located 406 light years away based on its parallax shift, but is drifting away at a rate of 5.52 km/s.

This star was designated Epsilon Caeli by Johann Elert Bode in his 1801 Uranographia, but this is now no longer used.

HD 32453 has a classification of G8 III, which states it is an evolved G-type star that exhausted hydrogen at its core and left the main sequence. At present it has 2.40 times the Sun's mass, but at an age of 700 million years, HD 32453 has expanded to 9.7 times the latter's girth. It radiates at 50 solar luminosities from its enlarged photosphere at an effective temperature of 5,032 K, which gives it a yellow hue. HD 32453 is slightly metal deficient, and spins slowly with a projected rotational velocity of 2 km/s, common for a giant star.
