= HD 32820 =

Star in the constellation of Caelum

Observation data Epoch J2000.0 Equinox ICRS
- Constellation: Caelum
- Right ascension: 05^{h} 03^{m} 53.95236^{s}
- Declination: −41° 44′ 41.8259″
- Apparent magnitude (V): 6.30±0.01

Characteristics
- Evolutionary stage: main sequence
- Spectral type: F8 V
- U−B color index: +0.04
- B−V color index: +0.53

Astrometry
Radial velocity (R_{v})	29.8±0.9 km/s
Proper motion (μ)	RA: +22.005 mas/yr Dec.: +158.650 mas/yr
Parallax (π)	31.6204±0.0176 mas
Distance	103.15 ± 0.06 ly (31.63 ± 0.02 pc)
Absolute magnitude (M_{V})	+3.79

Details
Mass	1.25 M_{☉}
Radius	1.33±0.03 R_{☉}
Luminosity	2.44±0.01 L_{☉}
Surface gravity (log g)	4.25 cgs
Temperature	6,227±68 K
Metallicity [Fe/H]	−0.04 dex
Rotational velocity (v sin i)	8 km/s
Age	3.46 Gyr

Other designations
- 27 G. Caeli, CD−41°1690, CPD−41°621, GC 6204, HD 32820, HIP 23555, HR 1651, SAO 217153

Database references
SIMBAD	data

HD 32820, also known as HR 1651, is a yellowish-white hued star located in the southern constellation Caelum, the chisel. It has an apparent magnitude of 6.3, placing it near the limit of naked eye visibility. The object is located relatively close at a distance of 103 light years based on parallax measurements from Gaia DR3, but is receding with a heliocentric radial velocity of 29.8 km/s.

HD 32820 has a stellar classification of F8 V, indicating that it is an ordinary F-type main-sequence star that is generating energy via hydrogen fusion at its core. It has 125% the mass of the Sun and 133% of its radius. It radiates double the luminosity of the Sun from its photosphere at an effective temperature of 6,227 K. HD 32820 is said to be 3.46 billion years old, slightly younger than the Sun, and has a near solar iron abundance. The star spins modestly with a projected rotational velocity of 8 km/s and is chromospherically inactive
