= HD 31529 =

Star in the constellation of Caelum

Observation data Epoch J2000.0 Equinox ICRS
- Constellation: Caelum
- Right ascension: 04^{h} 54^{m} 54.81319^{s}
- Declination: −39° 37′ 42.9886″
- Apparent magnitude (V): 6.09±0.01

Characteristics
- Evolutionary stage: red giant branch
- Spectral type: K3 III
- B−V color index: +1.42

Astrometry
Radial velocity (R_{v})	28.4±0.4 km/s
Proper motion (μ)	RA: −6.482 mas/yr Dec.: +22.102 mas/yr
Parallax (π)	3.4977±0.0268 mas
Distance	932 ± 7 ly (286 ± 2 pc)
Absolute magnitude (M_{V})	−1.73

Details
Mass	4.81^{+0.11}_{−0.04} M_{☉}
Radius	54.06 R_{☉}
Luminosity	915 L_{☉}
Surface gravity (log g)	1.15 cgs
Temperature	4,159±122 K
Metallicity [Fe/H]	−0.12 dex
Rotational velocity (v sin i)	2.1±1.3 km/s

Other designations
- 22 G. Caeli, CD−39°1691, CPD−39°536, FK5 2371, GC 6016, HD 31529, HIP 22847, HR 1584, SAO 195400

Database references
SIMBAD	data

HD 31529, also known as HR 1584, is a solitary, orange hued star located in the southern constellation Caelum, the chisel. It has an apparent magnitude of 6.09, making it faintly visible to the naked eye if viewed under ideal conditions. This object is located relatively far at a distance of 932 light years based on parallax measurements from Gaia DR3, but is receding with a heliocentric radial velocity of 28.4 km/s. Eggen (1989) lists it as a member of the old disk population.

This star was designated Pi Caeli by Johann Elert Bode in his 1801 Uranographia, but this is now no longer used.

This is an evolved red giant star with a stellar classification of K3 III. It is currently on the red giant branch, generating energy by fusing hydrogen in a shell around its core. It has 4.8 times the mass of the Sun and an enlarged radius of 54.06 R_{☉} due to its evolved state. It radiates 915 times the luminosity of the Sun from its photosphere at an effective temperature of 4,159 K. HD 31529 is slightly metal deficient (76% solar iron abundance) and spins modestly with a projected rotational velocity of 2.1 km/s.
