= HD 30080 =

Star in the constellation of Caelum

- Location of HD 30080 (circled)

Observation data Epoch J2000.0 Equinox ICRS
- Constellation: Caelum
- Right ascension: 04^{h} 43^{m} 09.29298^{s}
- Declination: −30° 45′ 56.0166″
- Apparent magnitude (V): 5.66±0.01

Characteristics
- Evolutionary stage: red giant branch
- Spectral type: K3 III
- U−B color index: +1.60
- B−V color index: +1.39

Astrometry
Radial velocity (R_{v})	−3.8±2.9 km/s
Proper motion (μ)	RA: −30.790 mas/yr Dec.: −67.724 mas/yr
Parallax (π)	5.326±0.0417 mas
Distance	612 ± 5 ly (188 ± 1 pc)
Absolute magnitude (M_{V})	−0.8

Details
Mass	1.16 M_{☉}
Radius	41.62 R_{☉}
Luminosity	299±5 L_{☉}
Surface gravity (log g)	1.40 cgs
Temperature	4,262±122 K
Metallicity [Fe/H]	+0.01 dex
Rotational velocity (v sin i)	<1 km/s

Other designations
- 12 G. Caeli, CD−30°1968, CPD−31°593, GC 5762, HD 30080, HIP 21958, HR 1509, SAO 195250

Database references
SIMBAD	data

HD 30080, also known as HR 1509, is a solitary, orange hued star located in the southern constellation Caelum, the chisel. It has an apparent magnitude of 5.66, allowing it to be faintly visible to the naked eye. Parallax measurements from Gaia DR3 place the object at a distance of 612 light years. It appears to be approaching the Solar System with a heliocentric radial velocity of −3.8 km/s. Eggen (1989) lists it as a member of the thick disk population.

HD 30080 is an evolved red giant with a stellar classification of K3 III. It is currently on the red giant branch, generating energy by fusing a hydrogen shell around an inert helium core. It has 116% the mass of the Sun but has expanded to 41.6 times its girth. It radiates 299 times the luminosity of the Sun from its enlarged photosphere at an effective temperature of 4,262 K. HD 30080 has a solar metallicity and spins slowly with a projected rotational velocity of <1 km/s.
