= HD 32515 =

Star in the constellation Caelum

Observation data Epoch J2000 Equinox ICRS
- Constellation: Caelum
- Right ascension: 05^{h} 02^{m} 22.8045^{s}
- Declination: −31° 46′ 16.8028″
- Apparent magnitude (V): 5.90±0.01

Characteristics
- Evolutionary stage: red giant branch
- Spectral type: K2 III
- B−V color index: +1.17

Astrometry
Radial velocity (R_{v})	+29±4 km/s
Proper motion (μ)	RA: −6.866 mas/yr Dec.: +84.982 mas/yr
Parallax (π)	10.0579±0.0324 mas
Distance	324 ± 1 ly (99.4 ± 0.3 pc)
Absolute magnitude (M_{V})	+1.02

Details
Mass	1.52 M_{☉}
Radius	11.9 R_{☉}
Luminosity	56.3+2.6 −2.5 L_{☉}
Surface gravity (log g)	2.44+0.11 −0.10 cgs
Temperature	4,540±100 K
Metallicity [Fe/H]	0.00 dex
Rotational velocity (v sin i)	1.4±1.2 km/s
Age	4.59 Gyr

Other designations
- 26 G. Caeli, CD−31°2163, CPD−31°684, GC 6169, HD 32515, HIP 23446, HR 1635, SAO 195509

Database references
SIMBAD	data

HD 32515 (HR 1635) is a solitary star located in the southern constellation Caelum. It has an apparent magnitude of 5.9, making it faintly visible to the naked eye under ideal conditions. The star is situated at a distance of 326 light years but is receding with a heliocentric radial velocity of 29.4 km/s.

This star was designated Theta Caeli by Johann Elert Bode in his 1801 Uranographia, but this is now no longer used.

HD 32515 has a stellar classification of K2 III, indicating that it is an early K-type giant star. HD 32515 has an angular diameter of 1.03±0.07 mas (after limb darkening correction); this yields a diameter 11.9 times that of the Sun at its estimated distance. At present, it has 152% of the Sun's mass and shines at 56.3 times the luminosity of the Sun from its enlarged photosphere at an effective temperature of 4,540 K, giving it an orange glow. HD 32515 has a similar metallicity and age to the Sun and spins slowly with a projected rotational velocity of 1.4 km/s
