= HD 30669 =

Star with an exoplanet in the constellation Caelum

Observation data Epoch J2000.0 Equinox ICRS
- Constellation: Caelum
- Right ascension: 04^{h} 48^{m} 28.48538^{s}
- Declination: −28° 25′ 09.4617″
- Apparent magnitude (V): 9.11±0.01

Characteristics
- Evolutionary stage: main sequence
- Spectral type: G8/K0 V
- B−V color index: +0.82

Astrometry
Radial velocity (R_{v})	65.7±0.4 km/s
Proper motion (μ)	RA: +237.591 mas/yr Dec.: +50.927 mas/yr
Parallax (π)	17.2896±0.0127 mas
Distance	188.6 ± 0.1 ly (57.84 ± 0.04 pc)
Absolute magnitude (M_{V})	+5.35

Details
Mass	0.92±0.03 M_{☉}
Radius	0.91±0.04 R_{☉}
Luminosity	0.71 L_{☉}
Surface gravity (log g)	4.43±0.06 cgs
Temperature	5,353±100 K
Metallicity [Fe/H]	+0.13 dex
Rotational velocity (v sin i)	<1.7 km/s
Age	7.25±4.64 Gyr

Other designations
- CD−28°1759, CPD−28°661, HD 30669, HIP 22320, SAO 169782, LTT 2095

Database references
SIMBAD	data
Exoplanet Archive	data

HD 30669 is a yellowish-orange hued star located in the southern constellation Caelum, the chisel. It has an apparent magnitude of 9.11, making it readily visible in small telescopes but not to the naked eye. The object is relatively close at a distance of 189 light-years, based on parallax measurements from Gaia DR3. Its distance from the Solar System is rapidly increasing, having a heliocentric radial velocity of 66 km/s.

== Characteristics ==
HD 30669 has a stellar classification of G8/K0 V — a main sequence star with the characteristics of a star with a class of G8 or K0. It has alternatively been given a class of G9 V. It has 92% the mass of the Sun and 91% its radius. The object radiates 71% the luminosity of the Sun from its photosphere at an effective temperature of 5,353 K from its photosphere. Like most planetary hosts, HD 30669 is metal enriched, having a metallicity 35% above solar levels. The star is extremely chromopsherically inactive and is estimated to be 7 1/4 billion years old.

== Planetary system ==
In 2015, C. Motou and colleagues discovered a long period exoplanet orbiting the star during a HARPS survey. It has nearly half the mass of Jupiter and it takes over 4 1/2 years to revolve HD 30669 in a slightly eccentric orbit.

A candidate second planet was identified in a 2026 study using HARPS-N. This would be a super-Neptune on an eccentric orbit closer to the star, with a period of 150 days. Despite the eccentric orbits of both planets, dynamical simulations show that the two-planet system is stable.

The HD 30669 planetary system
Companion (in order from star)	Mass	Semimajor axis (AU)	Orbital period (days)	Eccentricity	Inclination (°)	Radius
.01 (unconfirmed)	≥28.7±3.5 M_{🜨}	0.5	149.9±0.2	0.496+0.088 −0.097	—	—
b	≥0.47±0.06 M_{J}	2.69±0.08	1684±61	0.33±0.06	—	—
