= HD 28454 =

Star in the constellation of Caelum

Observation data Epoch J2000.0 Equinox J2000.0 (ICRS)
- Constellation: Caelum
- Right ascension: 04^{h} 27^{m} 05.96464^{s}
- Declination: −46° 56′ 50.9697″
- Apparent magnitude (V): 6.10

Characteristics
- Evolutionary stage: main sequence
- Spectral type: F5.5 V
- U−B color index: −0.07
- B−V color index: +0.48

Astrometry
Radial velocity (R_{v})	15±2.4 km/s
Proper motion (μ)	RA: +63.853 mas/yr Dec.: −270.620 mas/yr
Parallax (π)	30.6049±0.0259 mas
Distance	106.57 ± 0.09 ly (32.67 ± 0.03 pc)
Absolute magnitude (M_{V})	+3.5

Details
Mass	1.24 M_{☉}
Radius	1.42±0.06 R_{☉}
Luminosity	3.26±0.01 L_{☉}
Surface gravity (log g)	4.30 ± 0.14 cgs
Temperature	6,468±80 K
Metallicity [Fe/H]	−0.25±0.10 dex
Rotation	14.810 days
Rotational velocity (v sin i)	8 km/s
Age	1.61 Gyr

Other designations
- 3 G. Caeli, CD−47°1383, CPD−47°441, FK5 2329, GC 5428, HD 28454, HIP 20781, HR 1418, SAO 216809

Database references
SIMBAD	data

HD 28454, also known as HR 1418, is a solitary, yellowish-white hued star located in the southern constellation Caelum, the chisel. It has an apparent magnitude of 6.1, making it faintly visible to the naked eye under ideal conditions. This star is located relatively close at a distance of about 107 light years based on parallax measurements of Gaia DR3 but is receding with a heliocentric radial velocity of 15 km/s.

This star was designated Chi Horologii by Johann Elert Bode in his 1801 Uranographia, but this is now no longer used.

HD 28454 is an ordinary F-type main sequence star with a stellar classification of F5.5 V. It has 1.21 times the mass of the Sun and 1.42 times its radius. It radiates 3.26 times the luminosity of the Sun from its photosphere at an effective temperature of 6,468 K. HD 28454 is estimated to be 1.61 billion years, and spins modestly with a projected rotational velocity of 8 km/s. The star is metal deficient, having an iron abundance 56% that of the Sun's.

A candidate extrasolar planet has been detected from Gaia DR3 astrometry. It has a minimum mass of 8 M_{J} and a minimum semi-major axis of 2.27 astronomical units.

The HD 28454 planetary system
Companion (in order from star)	Mass	Semimajor axis (AU)	Orbital period (days)	Eccentricity	Inclination (°)	Radius
b (unconfirmed)	≥8.0 M_{J}	≥2.27	—	—	—	—
