= HD 28246 =

High proper motion star in the constellation Caelum

Observation data Epoch J2000 Equinox J2000
- Constellation: Caelum
- Right ascension: 04^{h} 25^{m} 19.1197^{s}
- Declination: −44° 09′ 39.222″
- Apparent magnitude (V): 6.38 ± 0.01

Characteristics
- Evolutionary stage: main sequence
- Spectral type: F5.5 V
- B−V color index: +0.44

Astrometry
Radial velocity (R_{v})	14.9 ± 0.3 km/s
Proper motion (μ)	RA: +27.324 mas/yr Dec.: +66.539 mas/yr
Parallax (π)	26.8312±0.018 mas
Distance	121.56 ± 0.08 ly (37.27 ± 0.03 pc)
Absolute magnitude (M_{V})	+3.55

Details
Mass	1.36 M_{☉}
Radius	1.38 R_{☉}
Luminosity	3.18 L_{☉}
Surface gravity (log g)	4.29 cgs
Temperature	6,570 K
Metallicity [Fe/H]	+0.02 dex
Rotation	1.072 days
Rotational velocity (v sin i)	8 km/s
Age	1.58 Gyr

Other designations
- 1 G. Caeli, CD−44°1546, CPD−44°478, GC 5380, HD 28246, HIP 20630, HR 1404, SAO 216790

Database references
SIMBAD	data

HD 28246 (HR 1404) is a solitary star located in the southern constellation Caelum. It has an apparent magnitude of 6.38, placing it near the max visibility to the unaided eye. The star is located relatively close at a distance of about 122 light years but is recceding with a heliocentric radial velocity of 14.9 km/s.

HD 28246 has a stellar classification of F5.5 V, indicating that it is an ordinary F-type main sequence star. At present it has 1.36 times the mass of the Sun and shines at 3.18 solar luminosities from its photosphere at an effective temperature of 6,570 K, giving it a yellow-white glow. HD 28246 has an iron abundance 105% that of the Sun, placing it at solar metallicity. At an age of 1.58 billion years, it spins leisurely with a projected rotational velocity of 8 km/s.
