= NGC 1598 =

Galaxy in Caelum constellation

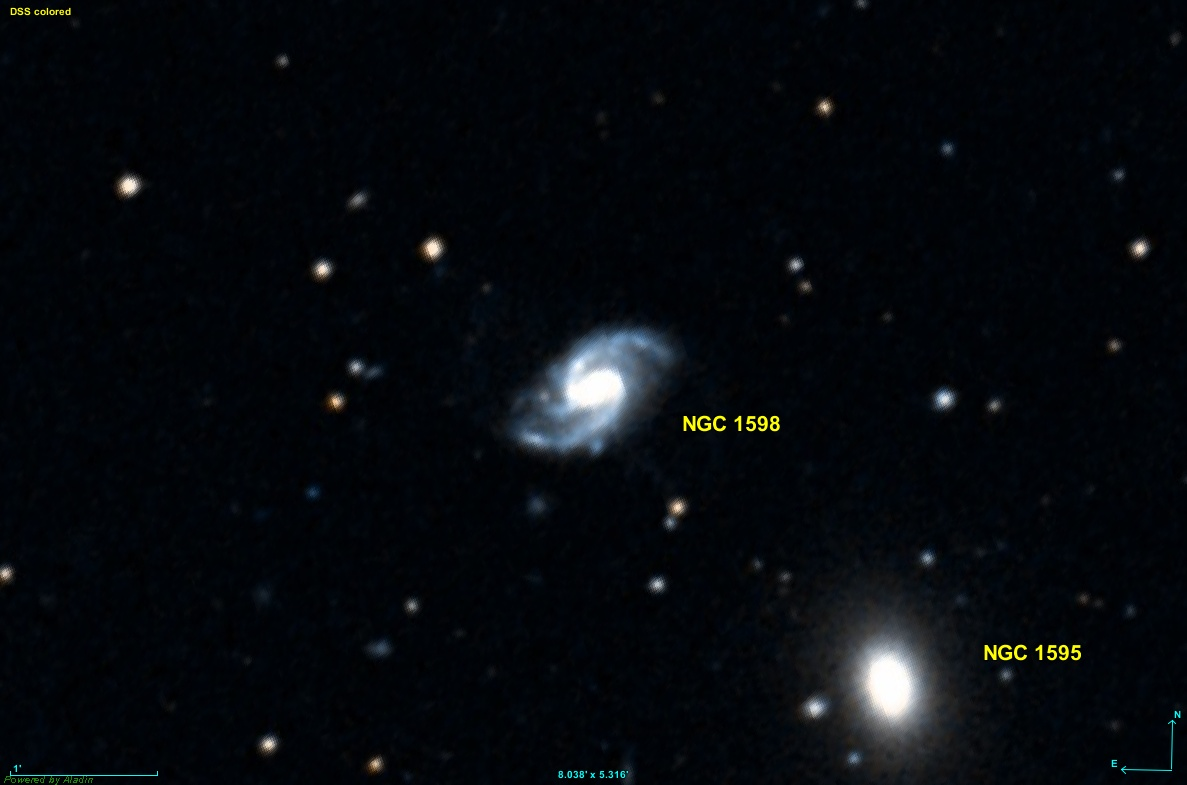
- Image of NGC 1598 with its neighbor NGC 1595

Observation data (J2000 epoch)
- Constellation: Caelum
- Right ascension: 04^{h} 08^{m} 23.6674^{s}
- Declination: −47° 46′ 56.792″
- Redshift: 0.017118 ± 0.0000017
- Heliocentric radial velocity: 5132 ± 5 km/s
- Galactocentric velocity: 4963 ± 8 km/s
- Distance: 246.2 ± 17.3 Mly (75.50 ± 5.29 Mpc)
- Apparent magnitude (V): 13.91

Characteristics
- Type: (R')SB(s)c pec?
- Size: ~95,500 ly (29.28 kpc) (estimated)

Other designations
- WISEA J042833.66-474656.7, LEDA 15204, PGC 15204

NGC 1598 (also known as LEDA 15204 ) is a spiral galaxy in the constellation Caelum. It was first discovered December 3, 1837 by John Herschel.

== Carafe Group ==
NGC 1598 is a member of the Carafe Group, a small galaxy group in the Virgo Supercluster, Other members of the Group include PGC 15172 and NGC 1595

== See also ==
- List of NGC objects (1001-2000)
- List of NGC objects
