= Lambda Caeli =

Star in the constellation Caelum

Observation data Epoch J2000 Equinox J2000
- Constellation: Caelum
- Right ascension: 04^{h} 43^{m} 44.272^{s}
- Declination: −41° 03′ 53.23″
- Apparent magnitude (V): 6.24

Characteristics
- Spectral type: K3/4III
- U−B color index: +1.78
- B−V color index: +1.468±0.008

Astrometry
Radial velocity (R_{v})	−4.3±0.4 km/s
Proper motion (μ)	RA: +10.950 mas/yr Dec.: +11.040 mas/yr
Parallax (π)	4.4581±0.0265 mas
Distance	732 ± 4 ly (224 ± 1 pc)
Absolute magnitude (M_{V})	−0.52

Details
Mass	4.20+0.11 −0.39 M_{☉}
Radius	33.0±0.7 R_{☉}
Luminosity	408.6+5.5 −4.5 L_{☉}
Surface gravity (log g)	4.47+0.10 −0.04 cgs
Temperature	4,118+128 −71 K

Other designations
- λ Cae, CD−41°1549, GC 5775, HD 30202, HIP 21998, HR 1518, SAO 216961

Database references
SIMBAD	data

Lambda Caeli is a star in the southern constellation of Caelum. Its name is a Bayer designation that is Latinized from λ Caeli, and abbreviated Lambda Cae or λ Cae; it is also known by its designations HD 30202 and HR 1518. This star is a challenge to view with the naked eye, having an apparent visual magnitude of 6.24. Based on parallax measurements, Lambda Caeli is known to be around 700 light-years (210 pc) distant from the Sun, but it is drifting closer with a radial velocity of −4 km/s.

This object is an aging K-type giant star with a stellar classification of K3/4III. Having exhausted the supply of hydrogen at its core, it has expanded and cooled; now having 31 times the radius of the Sun. With 4.2 times the mass of the Sun, it is radiating 409 times the Sun's luminosity from its swollen photosphere at an effective temperature of 4,118 K.
