= Alpha Caeli =

Brightest star in the constellation Caelum

α Caeli
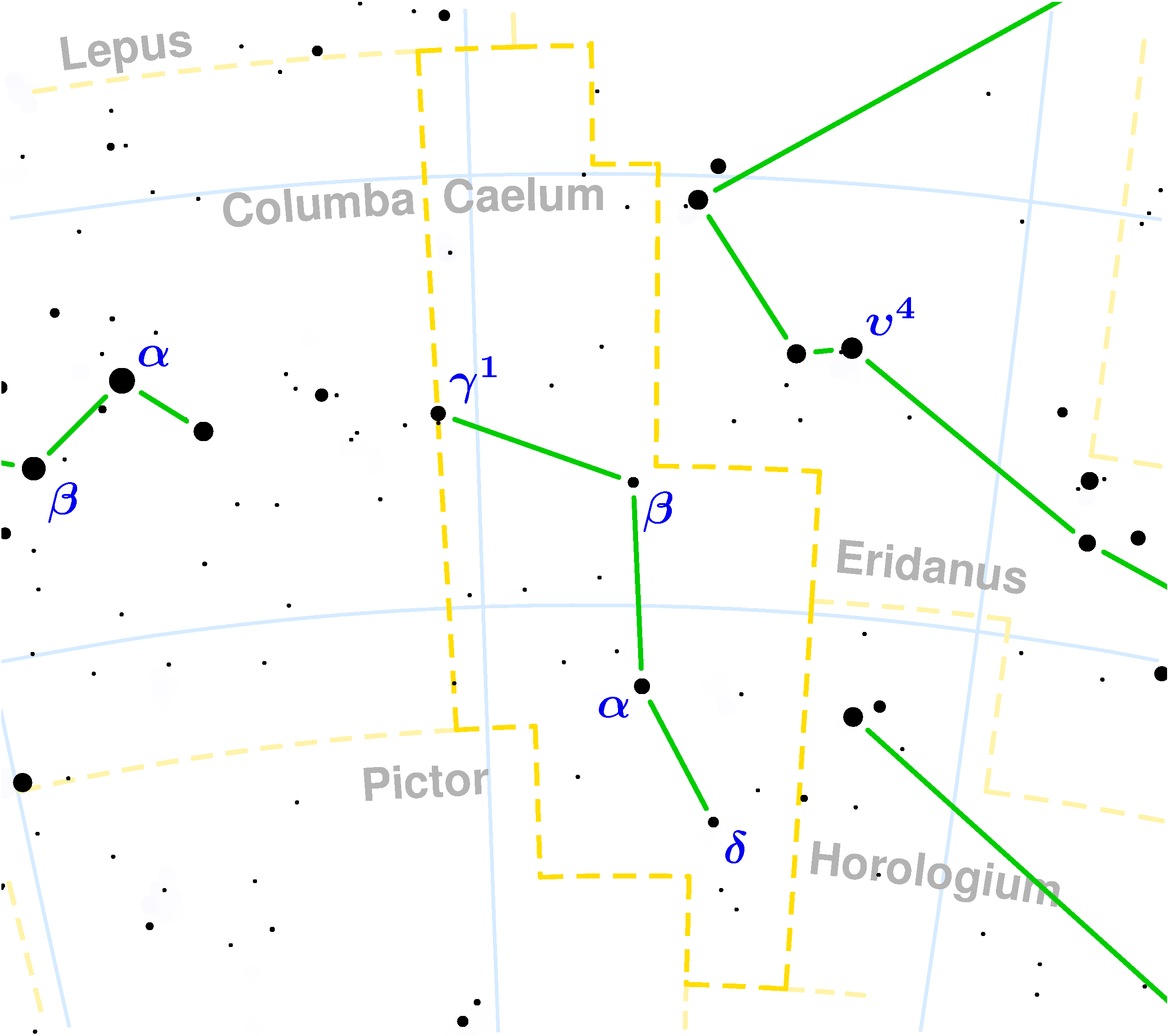
- Location of α Caeli in Caelum (circled)

Observation data Epoch J2000.0 Equinox J2000.0
- Constellation: Caelum
- A
- Right ascension: 04^{h} 40^{m} 33.71251^{s}
- Declination: −41° 51′ 49.5045″
- Apparent magnitude (V): 4.44 – 4.47
- B
- Right ascension: 04^{h} 40^{m} 33.92449^{s}
- Declination: −41° 51′ 56.3362″
- Apparent magnitude (V): 12.5

Characteristics

A
- Evolutionary stage: main sequence
- Spectral type: F2V
- U−B color index: 0.01
- B−V color index: +0.34
- Variable type: suspected Delta Scuti

B
- Evolutionary stage: Red dwarf
- Spectral type: M0.5V
- Variable type: Flare star

Astrometry

A
Radial velocity (R_{v})	0.65±0.3 km/s
Proper motion (μ)	RA: −139.843 mas/yr Dec.: −75.677 mas/yr
Parallax (π)	49.062±0.00937 mas
Distance	66.48 ± 0.01 ly (20.382 ± 0.004 pc)
Absolute magnitude (M_{V})	2.93±0.01

B
Absolute magnitude (M_{V})	9.8

Orbit
Primary	A
Name	B
Period (P)	406,000 days (1,110 years)
Semi-major axis (a)	133.1 AU

Details

A
Mass	1.54 M_{☉}
Radius	1.546 R_{☉}
Luminosity	5.156 L_{☉}
Surface gravity (log g)	4.12 cgs
Temperature	7,002 K
Metallicity [Fe/H]	−0.06±0.06 dex
Rotation	1.4 days
Rotational velocity (v sin i)	47.8±2.4 km/s
Age	1.5 Gyr

B
Radius	0.45 R_{☉}
Temperature	3,355 K

Position (relative to A)
Component	B
Epoch of observation	2008
Angular distance	6.6″

Other designations
- α Caeli, GJ 174.1, GJ 9164, HD 29875, HIP 21770, HR 1502, PPM 308904, WDS J04406-4152, TIC 77263680, TYC 7589-1693-1, GSC 07589-01693, IRAS 04389-4157, 2MASS J04403374-4151495, WISE J044033.59-415150.2

Database references
SIMBAD	A
- B

Alpha Caeli is a binary star system in the southern constellation Caelum. Its name is a Bayer designation that is Latinized from α Caeli, and abbreviated Alpha Cae or α Cae. With a combined apparent visual magnitude of 4.45, it is only visible to the naked eye in places far from light pollution, but still is the brightest star in the constellation. Parallax measurements by the Gaia spacecraft indicate a distance of 66.48 light-years (20.38 pc) to Alpha Caeli. It has a relatively low radial velocity, estimated at 0.7 km/s relative to the Sun.

This system consists of an F-type star of magnitude 4.46 and a small red dwarf of magnitude 12.5. As of 2008, they are separated by 6.6" in the sky. A debris disk has been detected around the primary component of the system.

== Physical properties ==
=== Primary ===
The primary component (α Caeli A) has a spectral classification of F2V, meaning that it is an ordinary F-type main-sequence star, currently fusing hydrogen into helium at its core. It is estimated to be 1.5 billion years old, has 50% more mass and has 1.55 times the Sun's radius. Its photosphere, which is emitting 5 times the solar luminosity, has an effective temperature of 7,000 K, so it is hotter than the Sun and has a white hue, typical of early F-type stars. α Caeli A is a rapid rotator, spinning at its own axis at a projected rotational velocity of 47 km/s.

The star is suspected of being a Delta Scuti variable star. The variation in the brightness is of 0.03 magnitudes. It was first suspected to be a variable star by M. Petit in 1979.

It presents a significant infrared excess at the 100 μm wavelength, which indicates that it is surrounded by an orbiting debris disk. The disk extends up to a radius of 46 AU from the star and has a temperature of 60 K (−213 °C). Its mass is estimated to be about 1/11,000 times Earth's mass (M_{🜨}), and was equivalent to about 1/7,100 M_{🜨} when α Caeli was only 1 million years old.

=== Companion and orbit ===
The companion (α Caeli B) is a small red dwarf star with spectral class of M0.5V and absolute magnitude 9.80. It is a flare star that undergoes random increases in luminosity. This star was separated from the primary by an angle of 6.6 arcseconds in 2008, but this separation changes over time. They are physically separated by 133 astronomical units and take 1,110 years to fully orbit each other.

Because of the small angular separation and faintness (12.5^{m}) of the companion, Alpha Caeli B is hard to see with a small telescope.

== Motion ==
Alpha Caeli is approximately 66.5 light years from Earth and is an estimated 1.5 billion years old. The space velocity components of this system are U = 10, V = 6 and W = −10 km/s. It is orbiting the Milky Way galaxy at an average distance of 8.006 kpc from the Galactic Center and with an orbital eccentricity of 0.07. This orbit lies close to the galactic plane, and the system travels no more than 0.05 kpc above or below this plane. Alpha Caeli is probably a member of the Ursa Major moving group of stars that have similar kinematic properties and probably originated from the same star cluster.

The nearest star to Alpha Caeli is LHS 1678, which is 3.4 light-years from it. This is closer than Proxima Centauri is to the Earth at 4.25 ly.

Nearest stars to Alpha Caeli
Name	Distance (light-years)
LHS 1678	3.4
L 447-6	5.9
HD 29220	6.1
SCR J0509-4325	6.5
UPM J0448-3539	7.4
