= Nu Caeli =

Star in the constellation Caelum

ν Caeli
- Location of ν Caeli (circled)

Observation data Epoch J2000.0 Equinox J2000.0 (ICRS)
- Constellation: Caelum
- Right ascension: 04^{h} 50^{m} 16.18032^{s}
- Declination: −41° 19′ 15.0557″
- Apparent magnitude (V): 6.07

Characteristics
- Spectral type: F2/3 V or F1 III-IV
- B−V color index: +0.37

Astrometry
Radial velocity (R_{v})	+23.8±0.8 km/s
Proper motion (μ)	RA: −3.846 mas/yr Dec.: +66.201 mas/yr
Parallax (π)	20.2691±0.0215 mas
Distance	160.9 ± 0.2 ly (49.34 ± 0.05 pc)
Absolute magnitude (M_{V})	+2.46

Details
Mass	1.34 M_{☉}
Radius	2.107 R_{☉}
Luminosity	8.011 L_{☉}
Surface gravity (log g)	4.20±0.14 cgs
Temperature	6,696 K
Metallicity [Fe/H]	−0.11 dex
Rotational velocity (v sin i)	44.9 km/s
Age	880 Myr

Other designations
- ν Cae, CD−41°1593, GC 5913, HD 30985, HIP 22488, HR 1557, SAO 217032, CCDM 04503-4119, WDS J04503-4119A

Database references
SIMBAD	data

Nu Caeli is a yellow-white hued star in the constellation Caelum. Its name is a Bayer designation that is Latinized from ν Caeli, and abbreviated Nu Cae or ν Cae. This star has an apparent visual magnitude of 6.07, which indicates it is near the lower limit of brightness that is visible to the naked eye. According to the Bortle scale, the star can be viewed from dark suburban skies. Based upon an annual parallax shift of 20.3 mas as seen from Earth, it is located 161 light-years (49 pc) from the Sun. The star is drifting further away with a line of sight velocity of +24 km/s.

Houk (1978) listed a stellar classification of F2/3 V for Nu Caeli, which would indicate this is an F-type main-sequence star. In contrast, Malaroda (1975) assigned it to class F1 III-IV, which would suggest it is a more evolved F-type subgiant/giant transitional object. It is an estimated 880 million years old and has a high rate of spin, showing a projected rotational velocity of 45 km/s. This star has 1.34 times the mass of the Sun and 2.1 times the Sun's radius. It is radiating eight times the Sun's luminosity from its photosphere at an effective temperature of 6,596 K.

A stellar companion is listed in multiple star catalogues. It is a 10th-magnitude star at an angular separation of about 13″, but is much further away than ν Caeli and thus unrelated.
