= RR Caeli =

Double star in the constellation Caelum

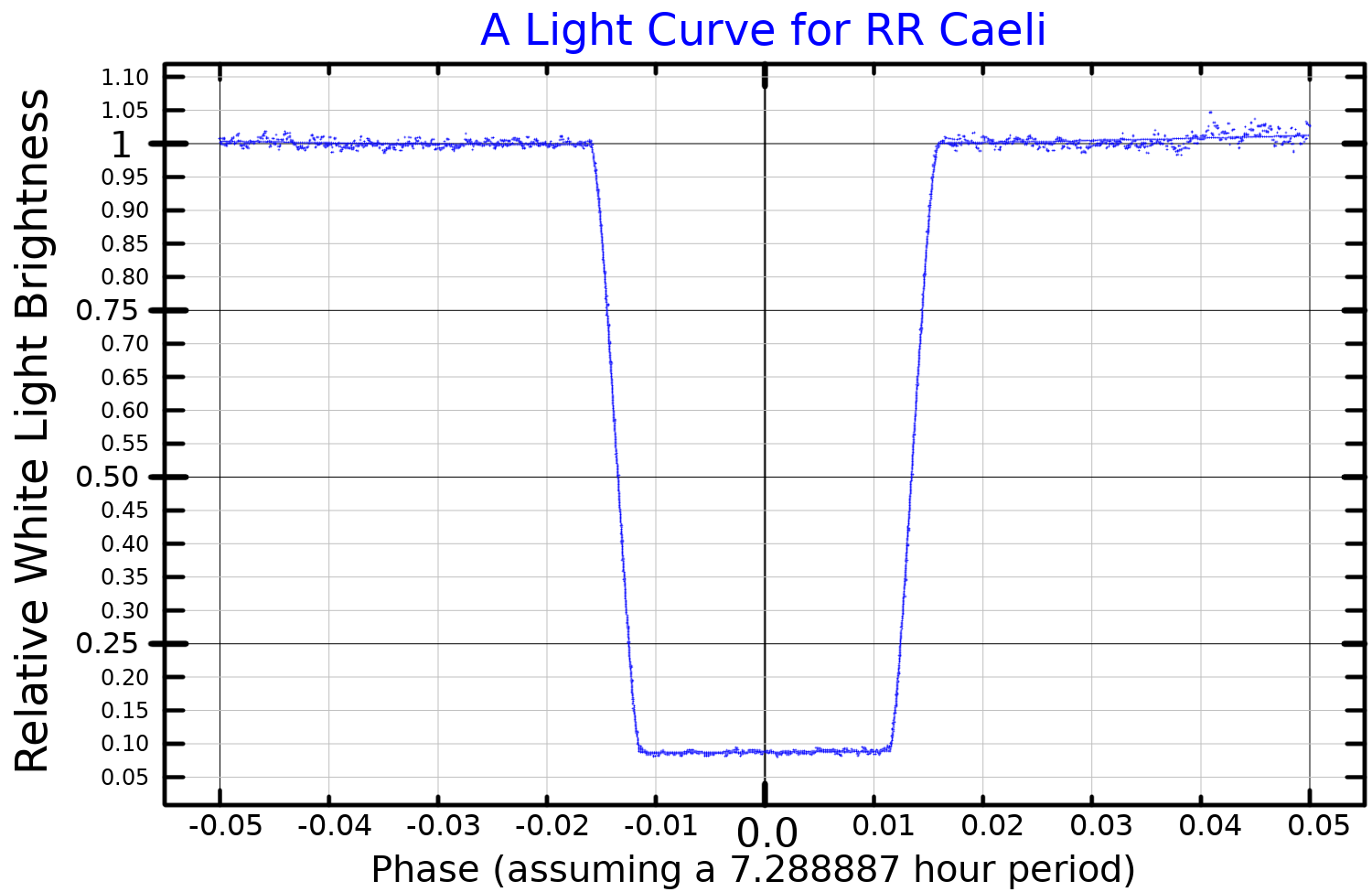
- A white light light curve for RR Caeli, adapted from Maxted et al. (2007)

Observation data Epoch J2000 Equinox ICRS
- Constellation: Caelum
- Right ascension: 04^{h} 21^{m} 05.563^{s}
- Declination: −48° 39′ 07.06″
- Apparent magnitude (V): 14.40

Characteristics
- Evolutionary stage: White dwarf + red dwarf
- Spectral type: DA7.8 + M4
- U−B color index: −0.42
- B−V color index: 0.52
- Variable type: Algol

Astrometry
Proper motion (μ)	RA: 30.030 mas/yr Dec.: −533.886 mas/yr
Parallax (π)	47.2±0.02 mas
Distance	69.10 ± 0.03 ly (21.186 ± 0.009 pc)

Orbit
Period (P)	7.289 h
Semi-major axis (a)	1.46 R_{☉}
Eccentricity (e)	0
Inclination (i)	87.9°
Semi-amplitude (K_{1}) (primary)	48 km/s
Semi-amplitude (K_{2}) (secondary)	196 km/s

Details

White dwarf
Mass	0.453±0.002 M_{☉}
Radius	0.01568±0.00009 R_{☉}
Luminosity (bolometric)	0.0007 ± 0.00015 (Note: From $\begin{smallmatrix}L=4 \pi R^2 \sigma T_{\rm eff}^4 \end{smallmatrix}$, where $\begin{smallmatrix}L \end{smallmatrix}$ is the luminosity, $\begin{smallmatrix}R \end{smallmatrix}$ is the radius, $\begin{smallmatrix}T_{\rm eff}\end{smallmatrix}$ is the effective surface temperature and $\begin{smallmatrix}\sigma \end{smallmatrix}$ is the Stefan–Boltzmann constant.) L_{☉}
Surface gravity (log g)	(7.67–7.72) ± 0.06 cgs
Temperature	7540 ± 175 K

Red dwarf
Mass	0.168±0.001 M_{☉}
Radius	(0.203–0.215) ± 0.015 R_{☉}
Luminosity (bolometric)	0.0038 ± 0.0013 L_{☉}
Surface gravity (log g)	(5.04–5.09) ± 0.04 cgs
Temperature	3100 ± 113 K

Other designations
- RR Caeli, LFT 349, WD 0419-487, GJ 2034, 2MASS J04210556-4839070, GSC 08072-01454, Gaia DR3 4788741548375134336

Database references
SIMBAD	data
Exoplanet Archive	data
ARICNS	data

RR Caeli is an eclipsing binary star system, located 69 light-years (21.0 parsecs) from Earth in the constellation Caelum. It is made up of a red dwarf star and a white dwarf, which complete an orbit around each other every seven hours. There is evidence of two circumbinary planets orbiting even further away.

== Properties ==
RR Caeli was first noted to be a high-proper motion star in 1955 by Jacob Luyten, and given the designation LFT 349.

This star system consists of a red dwarf of spectral type M6 and a white dwarf that orbit each other every seven hours; the former is 18% as massive as the Sun, while the latter has 44% of the Sun's mass. The red dwarf is tidally locked with the white dwarf, meaning it displays the same side to the heavier star. The system is also a post-common-envelope binary, and the red dwarf star is transferring material onto the white dwarf. In approximately 9–20 billion years, RR Caeli will likely become a cataclysmic variable star due to the period's gradual shortening, leading to increasing rates of transfer of hydrogen to the surface of the white dwarf. The white dwarf is likely to have a plain helium core, as its density is too low for the carbon-oxygen core.

Discovered to be an eclipsing binary in 1979, it has a baseline magnitude of 14.36, dimming markedly every 7.2 hours for an interval of around 10 minutes, due to the total eclipse of the hotter star by the cooler one. Its variability in brightness led to its being given the variable star designation RR Caeli in 1984. There are very shallow secondary eclipses where the white dwarf transits across the red dwarf.

== Eclipse time variations and proposed planetary system ==
In 2012, analysis of slight variations in the observed light curve of the system showed that there was likely a giant planet about four times as massive as Jupiter orbiting the pair of stars with a period of 11.9 years, and that there was also evidence for a second possible substellar body further out. More observations of the light curve are likely to help confirm the presence of one or both planets. A 2022 study found that at least the 2012 model fails to predict recent changes in eclipse timing, suggesting that a different explanation for the eclipse timing variations may be needed. A two-planet model was presented in 2021, but it also fails to predict recent changes in eclipse timing as found in a 2025 study. This study does not rule out the presence of the planets, but suggest that the ETVs may have multiple causes.

The RR Caeli (2021) planetary system
Companion (in order from star)	Mass	Semimajor axis (AU)	Orbital period (years)	Eccentricity	Inclination (°)	Radius
b (controversial)	≥3.0±0.3 M_{J}	5.2±0.1	15.0±0.6	0	>17.6°	—
c (controversial)	≥2.7±0.7 M_{J}	9.7±0.9	39±5	0	—	—
