= RV Caeli =

Star in the constellation Caelum

- Location of RV Caeli (circled)

Observation data Epoch J2000 Equinox ICRS
- Constellation: Caelum
- Right ascension: 04^{h} 28^{m} 09.46368^{s}
- Declination: −41° 51′ 35.4013″
- Apparent magnitude (V): 6.4±0.01

Characteristics
- Evolutionary stage: AGB
- Spectral type: M1 III
- B−V color index: +1.64
- Variable type: semiregular

Astrometry
Radial velocity (R_{v})	97.9±0.5 km/s
Proper motion (μ)	RA: −14.75 mas/yr Dec.: +2.87 mas/yr
Parallax (π)	2.4402±0.0229 mas
Distance	1,340 ± 10 ly (410 ± 4 pc)
Absolute magnitude (M_{V})	−1.36

Details
Mass	1.14 M_{☉}
Radius	107 R_{☉}
Luminosity	976±30 L_{☉}
Surface gravity (log g)	0.67 cgs
Temperature	3,843±122 K
Metallicity [Fe/H]	−0.15 dex

Other designations
- 4 G. Caeli, CD−42°1510, CPD−42°469, GC 5451, HD 28552, HIP 20856, HR 1429, SAO 216821

Database references
SIMBAD	data

RV Caeli, also known as HD 28552, is a solitary, red hued variable star located in the southern constellation Caelum, the chisel. It has an apparent magnitude of 6.4, placing it near the limit for naked eye visibility. The object is located at a distance of 1,340 light years based on parallax measurements from Gaia DR3, but is rapidly receding with a heliocentric radial velocity of 98 km/s.

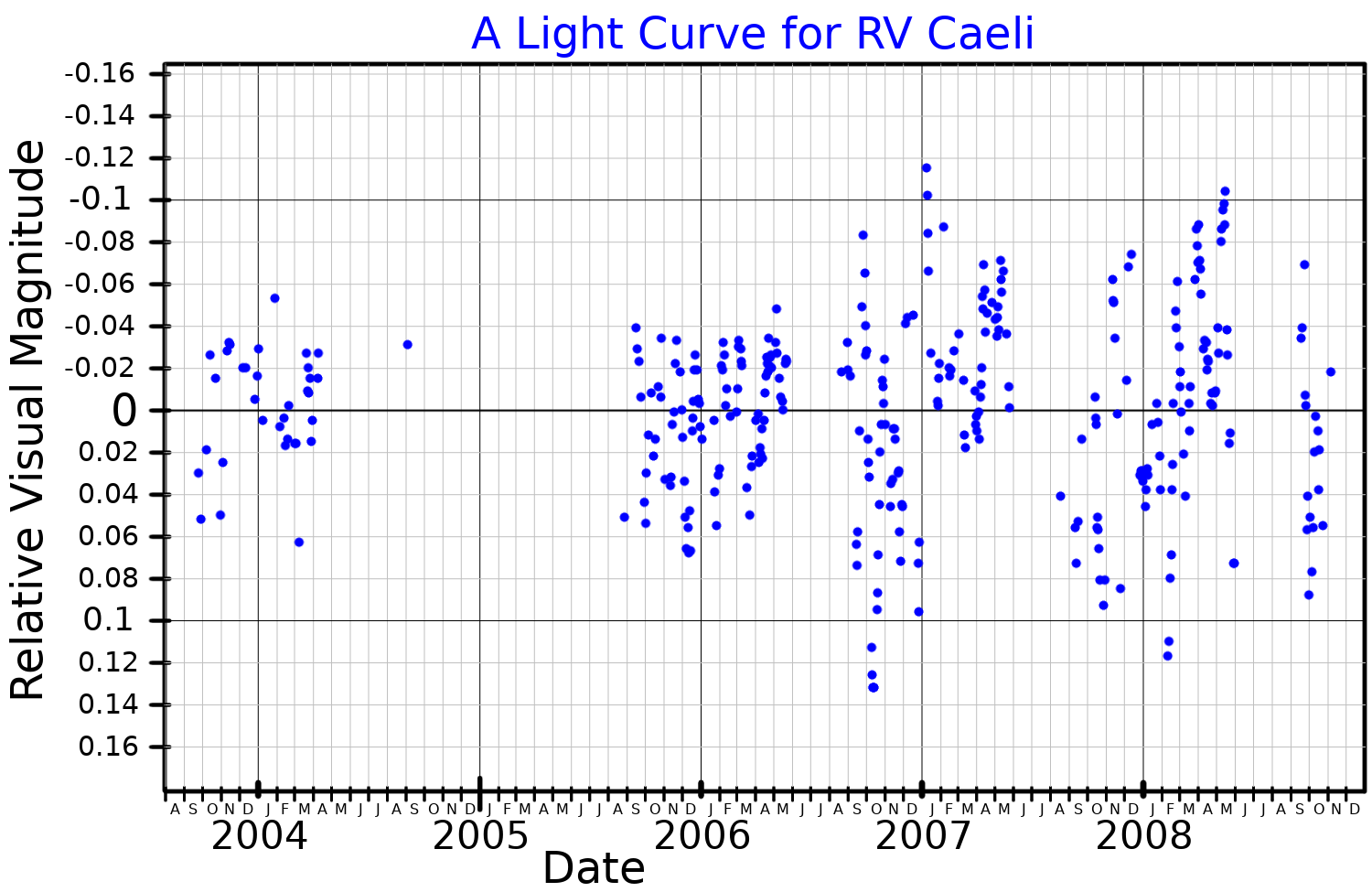
A visual band light curve for RV Caeli, adapted from Tabur et al. (2009).

Hipparcos has found it to vary between its photometric values of 6.44 and 6.56, which roughly corresponds with the magnitude as seen with the naked eye. It was first suspected of variability in 1970, and a 1982 survey also identified suspected variations. However, it could not confirm it was a variable star. It was confirmed as a variable star in 1999 on the basis of the Hipparcos photometry and given the variable star designation RV Caeli.

RV Caeli is an evolved red giant star with a stellar classification of M1 III. It is currently on the asymptotic giant branch, generating energy via hydrogen and helium shell fusion around an inert carbon core. It has 114% the mass of the Sun but has expanded to over 100 times its girth. It radiates 976 times the luminosity of the Sun from its photosphere at an effective temperature of 3,843 K. RV Caeli is metal deficient, having an iron abundance 70% that of the Sun.
