= Beta Caeli =

Binary star in the constellation Caelum

- Location of β Caeli (circled)

Observation data Epoch J2000.0 Equinox J2000.0 (ICRS)
- Constellation: Caelum
- Right ascension: 04^{h} 42^{m} 03.482^{s}
- Declination: −37° 08′ 39.59″
- Apparent magnitude (V): 5.04

Characteristics
- Spectral type: F3 V or F3 IV
- U−B color index: +0.01
- B−V color index: +0.38

Astrometry
Radial velocity (R_{v})	27.47±0.24 km/s
Proper motion (μ)	RA: +42.561 mas/yr Dec.: +212.705 mas/yr
Parallax (π)	34.6088±0.0531 mas
Distance	94.2 ± 0.1 ly (28.89 ± 0.04 pc)
Absolute magnitude (M_{V})	+2.64

Orbit
Primary	A
Name	B
Period (P)	7.5 yr
Semi-major axis (a)	4.6 AU
Eccentricity (e)	0.6
Inclination (i)	27 or 153°
Longitude of the node (Ω)	151°
Argument of periastron (ω) (secondary)	38°

Details

β Cae A
Mass	1.482±0.040 M_{☉}
Radius	1.902+0.001 −0.004 R_{☉}
Luminosity	6.615+0.020 −0.019 L_{☉}
Surface gravity (log g)	3.981+0.003 −0.002 cgs
Temperature	6,665.7+1.6 −1.4 K
Metallicity	$\begin{smallmatrix}\left[\ce{M}/\ce{H}\right]\end{smallmatrix}$ = −0.12
Rotation	0.8669±0.0013 days
Rotational velocity (v sin i)	97.5±4.9 km/s
Age	0.2 or 1.17 Gyr; 1.941±0.307 Gyr

β Cae B
Mass	0.08 or 0.2 M_{☉}
Temperature	3,593±160 K

Other designations
- β Cae, CD−37°1867, FK5 1130, GJ 176.1, GJ 9165, HD 29992, HIP 21861, HR 1503, SAO 195239

Database references
SIMBAD	data

Beta Caeli is a star with an orbiting companion in the southern constellation of Caelum. Its name is a Bayer designation that is Latinized from β Caeli, and abbreviated Beta Cae or β Cae. This star is dimly visible to the naked eye, having an apparent visual magnitude of 5.04. Based upon an annual parallax shift of 34.6 mas as seen from Earth, it is located at a distance of 94 light-years (29 pc). The star is moving away from the Sun with a radial velocity of +27.5 km/s.

== Characteristics ==
Beta Caeli is a probable single-lined spectroscopic binary system, meaning only the spectral lines of the visible component can be seen. This primary component has a stellar classification of F3 V or F3 IV, indicating it is either an F-type main-sequence star or a somewhat more evolved subgiant star, respectively. It has an estimated 1.5 times the mass of the Sun and about 1.9 times the Sun's radius. The star is 200 million to two billion years old and has a high rate of spin with a projected rotational velocity of around 97.5 km/s. It is radiating 6.6 times the luminosity of the Sun from its photosphere at an effective temperature of 6,666 K. Based on the amount of iron detected, the abundance of elements with mass greater than helium is lower than in the Sun.

The low-mass companion is orbiting about 5 AU from the primary, with an orbital period of around seven years. Its exact mass is uncertain; an orbital solution suggest it is close to the brown dwarf regime at around 0.08 M_{☉}, but models of stellar atmospheres suggest a higher mass of 0.2 M_{☉}. It was first detected in 2017 and was believed to be either a brown dwarf or a star with minimum mass around 40 Jupiter masses. In 2022, Beta Caeli was imaged with the Gemini Planet Imager, with a point source that very likely is β Caeli B being detected. This object may be the source of the X-ray emission coming from the same location, which suggests the companion could be a late-type star.

The existence of additional companions beyond 55 astronomical units is ruled out.
