= Zeta Caeli =

Star in the constellation Caelum

- Location of ζ Caeli (circled)

Observation data Epoch J2000.0 Equinox J2000.0 (ICRS)
- Constellation: Caelum
- Right ascension: 04^{h} 47^{m} 49.57719^{s}
- Declination: −30° 01′ 13.3391″
- Apparent magnitude (V): +6.36

Characteristics
- Evolutionary stage: red giant branch
- Spectral type: K0 III
- B−V color index: +1.06

Astrometry
Radial velocity (R_{v})	+6.7±1.0 km/s
Proper motion (μ)	RA: +28.747 mas/yr Dec.: +92.712 mas/yr
Parallax (π)	6.8479±0.0167 mas
Distance	476 ± 1 ly (146.0 ± 0.4 pc)
Absolute magnitude (M_{V})	+0.76

Details
Mass	2.90+0.04 −0.30 M_{☉}
Radius	12.45±0.25 R_{☉}
Luminosity	86.67+0.42 −0.44 L_{☉}
Surface gravity (log g)	2.62±0.01 cgs
Temperature	4,992+6 −5 K
Metallicity [Fe/H]	−0.22 dex
Age	414+99 −41 Myr

Other designations
- ζ Cae, CD−30°2011, GC 5851, HD 30608, HIP 22280, HR 1539, SAO 195300

Database references
SIMBAD	data

Zeta Caeli is an orange-hued star in the southern constellation of Caelum. Its name is a Bayer designation that is Latinized from ζ Caeli, and abbreviated Zeta Cae or ζ Cae. With an apparent visual magnitude of +6.36, it is near the lower limit of brightness for stars visible to the naked eye. Based upon an annual parallax shift of 7.59 mas as seen from Earth, this star is located about 430 light-years (130 pc) away. It is drifting further from the Sun with a line of sight velocity of +7 km/s.

This is an evolved K-type giant star with a stellar classification of K0 III. At an estimated 414 million years of age, this star has 2.9 times the mass of the Sun but it has expanded to 12 times the Sun's radius. It is radiating 87 times the luminosity of the Sun from its enlarged photosphere at an effective temperature of 4,992 K. This star is a member of the Milky Way's thick disk population.
