= Delta Caeli =

Star in the constellation Caelum

- Location of δ Caeli (circled)

Observation data Epoch J2000.0 Equinox J2000.0 (ICRS)
- Constellation: Caelum
- Right ascension: 04^{h} 30^{m} 50.100^{s}
- Declination: −44° 57′ 13.50″
- Apparent magnitude (V): +5.06

Characteristics
- Spectral type: B2 IV-V
- U−B color index: −0.78
- B−V color index: −0.20

Astrometry
Radial velocity (R_{v})	14.2±0.8 km/s
Proper motion (μ)	RA: +1.683 mas/yr Dec.: −3.139 mas/yr
Parallax (π)	4.7826±0.0889 mas
Distance	680 ± 10 ly (209 ± 4 pc)
Absolute magnitude (M_{V})	−1.35

Details
Mass	6.78±0.06 M_{☉}
Radius	3.95±0.10 R_{☉}
Luminosity	2,075+73 −68 L_{☉}
Surface gravity (log g)	3.965+0.012 −0.016 cgs
Temperature	19,616±32 K
Rotational velocity (v sin i)	10.0 km/s
Age	9.4±0.6 Myr

Other designations
- δ Cae, CD−45°1567, FK5 167, HD 28873, HIP 21060, HR 1443, SAO 216850

Database references
SIMBAD	data

Delta Caeli is a solitary, blue-white hued star in the southern constellation of Caelum. Its name is a Bayer designation that is Latinized from δ Caeli, and abbreviated Delta Cae or Delta Cae. This is a dim star but visible to the naked eye, having an apparent visual magnitude of +5.06. Based upon an annual parallax shift of 4.63 mas as seen from Earth, this star is located approximately 680 light-years (210 pc) away. At that distance, the visual magnitude is diminished by an extinction factor of 0.13 due to interstellar dust. It is receding from the Sun with a radial velocity of 14 km/s.

This is a B-type star with a stellar classification of B2 IV-V, where the luminosity class IV-V indicates the spectrum shows mixed traits of a subgiant star and a main sequence star. It has 7 times the mass of the Sun and about 4 times the Sun's radius. The star is around nine million years old and is spinning with a projected rotational velocity of 10 km/s. It is radiating 2,075 times the Sun's luminosity from its photosphere at an effective temperature of 19,616 K.
