= X Caeli =

Star in the constellation Caelum

Observation data Epoch J2000 Equinox J2000
- Constellation: Caelum
- Right ascension: 05^{h} 04^{m} 26.157^{s}
- Declination: −35° 42′ 18.38″
- Apparent magnitude (V): 6.28 – 6.39 (6.43 + 9.65)

Characteristics
- Spectral type: F2 IV/V
- B−V color index: 0.311±0.006
- Variable type: δ Sct

Astrometry
Radial velocity (R_{v})	+6.4±0.8 km/s
Proper motion (μ)	RA: +28.361 mas/yr Dec.: +40.338 mas/yr
Parallax (π)	9.7026±0.0221 mas
Distance	336.2 ± 0.8 ly (103.1 ± 0.2 pc)
Absolute magnitude (M_{V})	1.36

Details

X Cae A
Mass	1.52 M_{☉}
Radius	3.43±0.32 R_{☉}
Luminosity	23.65 L_{☉}
Surface gravity (log g)	3.80 cgs
Temperature	7,227±246 K
Rotational velocity (v sin i)	69.0±1.0 km/s
Age	961 Myr

Other designations
- γ^{2} Cae, γ^{2} Caeli, X Caeli, CD−35°2090, GC 6214, HD 32846, HIP 23596, HR 1653, SAO 195534, CCDM 05044-3542, WDS J05044-3542AB

Database references
SIMBAD	data

X Caeli is a binary star system in the southern constellation of Caelum. It has the Bayer designation Gamma^{2} Caeli, which is Latinized from γ^{2} Caeli and abbreviated Gamma^{2} Cae or γ^{2} Cae; X Caeli is the system's variable star designation. This system is barely visible to the naked eye with a combined apparent visual magnitude of 6.32. Based upon an annual parallax shift of 9.7 mas, it is located at a distance of 336 light-years (103 pc) from Earth. The system is moving further away from the Sun with a radial velocity of +6 km/s.

== Properties ==
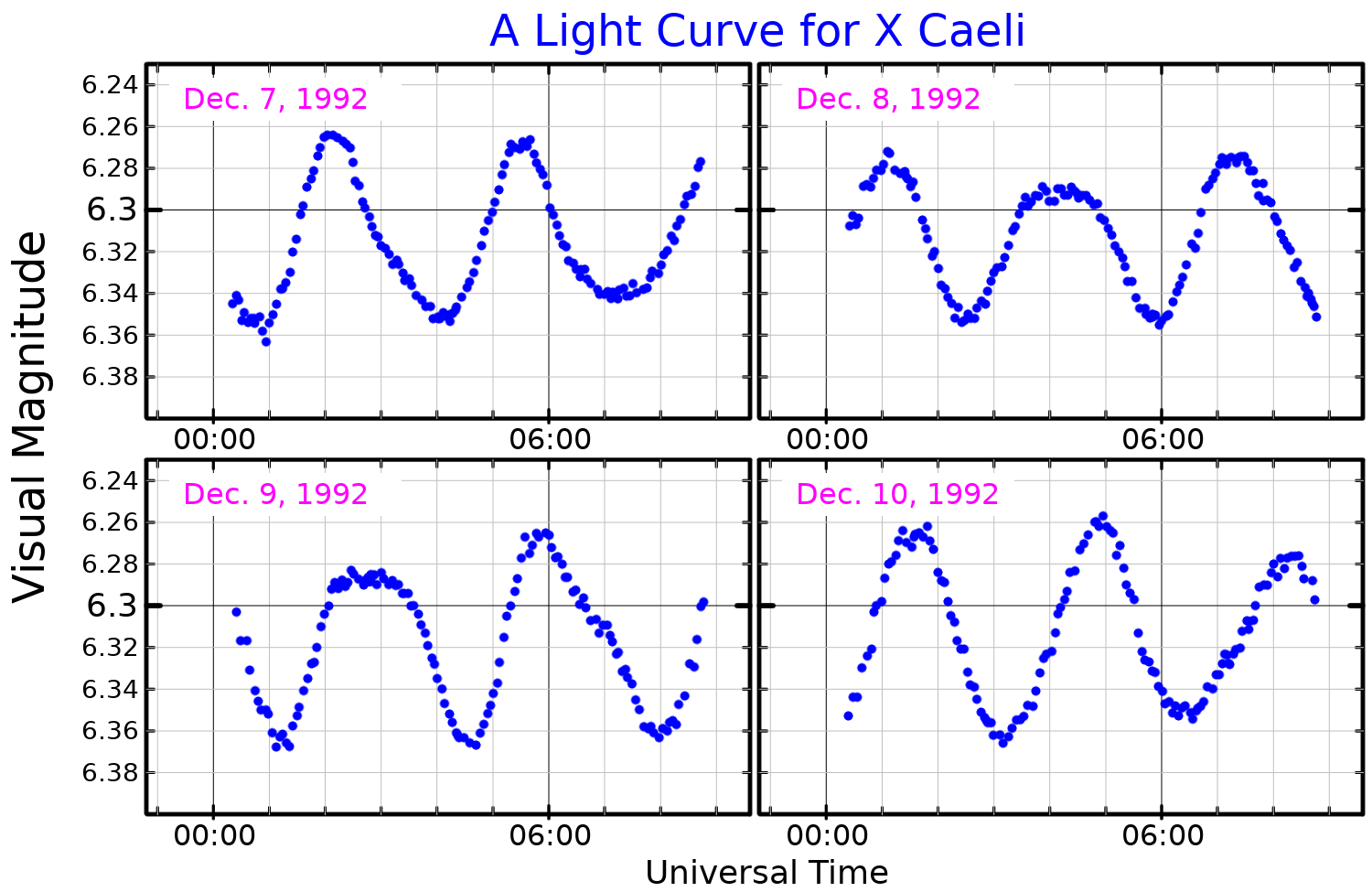
A visual-band light curve for X Caeli, adapted from Mantegazza and Poretti (1996)

The yellow-white-hued primary, component A, has an apparent magnitude of +6.32 and stellar classification of F2 IV/V, showing mixed traits of an F-type main-sequence star and a subgiant. The spectral lines display a narrow absorption core that suggests the presence of a circumstellar shell.

This star is classified as a Delta Scuti variable with a brightness varies from magnitude 6.28 to 6.39 over a period of 3.25 hours. A 2000 observing campaign identified at least six independent pulsation modes for this variation. It has 1.5 times the mass of the Sun and 3.4 times the Sun's radius. This star is radiating 24 times the luminosity of the Sun from its photosphere at an effective temperature of 7,227 K. It is nearly a billion years old, with a relatively high rate of rotation, showing a projected rotational velocity of 69 km/s.

The companion star, component B, has an apparent magnitude of +9.65 and, as of 2000, is at an angular separation of 0.890″ along a position angle of 183°. The orbital period for this binary star system is unknown.
