= Gamma1 Caeli =

Double star in the constellation Caelum

γ^{1} Caeli
- Location of γ^{1} Caeli

Observation data Epoch J2000 Equinox ICRS
- Constellation: Caelum
- γ^{1} Caeli A
- Right ascension: 05^{h} 04^{m} 24.402^{s}
- Declination: −35° 28′ 58.71″
- Apparent magnitude (V): 4.57±0.01
- γ^{1} Caeli B
- Right ascension: 05^{h} 04^{m} 24.191^{s}
- Declination: −35° 28′ 56.86″
- Apparent magnitude (V): 8.07±0.01

Characteristics

γ^{1} Caeli A
- Spectral type: K2III-IIIb
- U−B color index: 1.197
- B−V color index: 1.198

γ^{1} Caeli B
- Spectral type: G8IV
- B−V color index: 0.84

Astrometry

γ^{1} Caeli A
Radial velocity (R_{v})	9.96±0.19 km/s
Proper motion (μ)	RA: 125.972 mas/yr Dec.: −42.909 mas/yr
Parallax (π)	17.5912±0.0834 mas
Distance	185.4 ± 0.9 ly (56.8 ± 0.3 pc)

γ^{1} Caeli B
Proper motion (μ)	RA: 123.107 mas/yr Dec.: −45.167 mas/yr
Parallax (π)	17.5332±0.024 mas
Distance	186.0 ± 0.3 ly (57.03 ± 0.08 pc)

Details

γ^{1} Caeli A
Mass	1.4+1.1 −0.4 M_{☉}
Radius	14.31+0.27 −0.56 R_{☉}
Luminosity	69.9±0.8 L_{☉}
Temperature	4,411+89 −41 K
Metallicity [Fe/H]	−0.1 dex
Rotational velocity (v sin i)	<1 km/s

γ^{1} Caeli B
Mass	0.91 M_{☉}
Surface gravity (log g)	4.45 cgs
Temperature	5,702 K
Metallicity [Fe/H]	−0.1 dex

Other designations
- γ^{1} Cae, CD−35 2089, HD 32831, HIP 23595, HR 1652, SAO 195532, WDS J05044-3529

Database references
SIMBAD	The system
- A
- B

Gamma^{1} Caeli is a double star in the southern constellation of Caelum. Its name is a Bayer designation that is Latinized from γ^{1} Caeli, and abbreviated Gamma^{1} Cae or γ^{1} Cae. This pair consists of an orange hued giant and a fainter yellow subgiant star with an angular separation of 3.20″, as of 2016. The brighter component is faintly visible to the naked eye with an apparent visual magnitude of 4.57. Based on parallax measurements, it is located at a distance of approximately 185 light-years (57 pc) from the Earth. This star is drifting further away from the Sun with a radial velocity of +10 km/s.

== Properties ==
Gamma^{1} Caeli A is an evolved K-type giant star with a stellar classification of K2III-IIIb. It is 40% more massive than the Sun and has expanded to 14.3 times the Sun's girth. This star is radiates 69.9 times the Sun's luminosity from its enlarged photosphere at an effective temperature of 4,411 K. It is metal poor, with 79% the abundance of elements more massive than helium compared to the Sun.

Gamma^{1} Caeli B has an apparent magnitude of 8.07, which makes it visible only in binoculars or a telescope, and is located at a similar distance to Component A with a comparable proper motion. It has a class of G8IV, matching an aging G-type subgiant star that has exhausted the supply of hydrogen at its core and is evolving away from the main sequence. This star has 91% of the Sun's mass.
