= List of smallest known stars =

This is a list of the smallest known stars, brown dwarfs and stellar remnants, sorted by increasing size. The list is divided into sublists, and contain notable objects up to 350,000 km in radius, or 0.50 R_{☉}, as well as all red dwarfs smaller than 0.1 R_{☉} and all neutron stars with accurately measured radii.

== 0 to 1,000 km ==
Partial list containing stars up to 0.0014 R_{☉}.

Star name	Star radius, kilometres	Star class	Notes	References
SGR J1935+2154	4.35+1.95 −1.35	Magnetar	Has one potential planet.	
RX J0720.4−3125	4.50+0.08 −0.09 – 5.38+0.13 −0.14	Neutron star		
Hercules X-1	8.10±0.41	Pulsar		
LMC X-4	8.301±0.2	Pulsar		
Centaurus X-3	9.178±0.130	Pulsar		
Vela X-1	9.56±0.0	Pulsar		
HESS J1731-347	10.40+0.86 −0.78	Neutron star	Lightest neutron star ever discovered, at a mass of 0.77 M_{☉}.	
PSR J0348+0432 A	11–15	Pulsar	Has a white dwarf companion.	
PSR J0437−4715	11.36+0.95 −0.63	Pulsar	Most stable known natural clock.	
GW170817 A	11.9±0.4	Pulsar		
GW170817 B	11.9±0.4	Pulsar		
PSR J1906+0746	11.99–12.85	Pulsar		
PSR J0205+6449	12	Pulsar	Pulsar located in the supernova remnant 3C 58.	
RX J1856.5−3754	12.1+1.3 −1.6	Neutron star	Nearest known neutron star.	
PSR J2043+1711	12.13–12.96	Pulsar		
PSR J1933-6211	12.15–12.98	Pulsar		
PSR J0952–0607 A	12.245+0.685 −0.315	Pulsar	Most massive neutron star so far discovered.	
4U 1702−429	12.4±0.4	Neutron star		
Vela pulsar	12.52–13.30	Pulsar		
PSR J1614−2230	13±2	Pulsar		
PSR J0348+0432	13±2	Pulsar		
PSR J0740+6620	13.7+2.6 −1.5	Pulsar		
ZTF J1406+1222 A	14	Neutron star	Has a substellar companion orbiting it closely.	
PSR J1748−2446Ad	16	Pulsar	Fastest spinning neutron star, it is constrained to a small size to avoid being torn apart, located in the star cluster Terzan 5, and potentially the largest known pulsar.	

== 1,000 to 50,000 km ==
Partial list containing stars from 0.0014 to 0.0718 R_{☉}.

Star name	Star radius, kilometres	Star radius, R_{☉}	Star class	Notes	References
RE J0317-853	2,200	0.0032	White dwarf	Among the most massive white dwarfs.	
SDSS J023836.27+764219.0	2,230	0.00321+0.00040 −0.00036	White dwarf	An ultramassive white dwarf ejected from the Hyades. At a mass of 1.317 M_{☉}, it is possibly the most massive known white dwarf consistent with single-star evolution. (Note: "Single-star evolution" refer to a star that did not accreted mass from a companion (e.g. a nova) nor formed by the merger of two stars or white dwarfs (e.g. ZTF J1901).)	
ZTF J1901+1458	2,664	0.00383+0.00016 −0.00016	White dwarf	Among the most massive white dwarfs, at (1.29–1.31)±0.01 M_{☉}, and a candidate white dwarf pulsar.	
T Coronae Borealis	3,130	0.0045	White dwarf	Expected to become a nova in the near future, its apparent magnitude may increase up to 2.0.	
Janus	3,400	0.004887^{+0.0010}_{−0.00086}	White dwarf	A white dwarf with a side of hydrogen and another side of helium.	
Wolf 1130 B	3,500	0.005	White dwarf	Nearest candidate for a supernova, a type Ia supernova.	
HD 49798 B	3,580	0.00515	White dwarf		
BPM 37093	4,060	0.00583±0.00008	White dwarf		
IK Pegasi B	4,200	0.006	White dwarf		
U Geminorum A	4,410	0.00634±0.00016	White dwarf		
WD 2317+1830	5,517	0.00793±0.00021	White dwarf		
BW Sculptoris	5,570	0.00800+0.00014 −0.00011	White dwarf		
Sirius B	5,634	0.008098±0.000046	White dwarf	Nearest white dwarf	
GRW +70 8247 (Gliese 742)	5,960	0.0086	White dwarf		(Note: Applying the Stefan–Boltzmann law with a nominal solar effective temperature of 5,772 K: $$\sqrt{\biggl(\frac{5,772}{11,880}\biggr)^4 \cdot 10^{-2.88}} = 0.00857\ R_\odot$$.)
Gamma Cassiopeiae Ab	6,000	0.00862^{+0.00009}_{−0.00046}	White dwarf		
AN Ursae Majoris	6,300	0.0091	White dwarf		
Gliese 915	6,750	0.0097±0.0001	White dwarf		
LP 658-2	6,778	0.0097	White dwarf		
BZ Ursae Majoris A	6,880	0.00989	White dwarf		
QS Virginis A	6,960	0.010±0.001	White dwarf		
AE Aquarii A	7,000	0.01	White dwarf	First discovered white dwarf pulsar.	
AR Scorpii A	7,000	0.01	White dwarf	A white dwarf pulsar. It is often mistaken as the first discovered white dwarf pulsar.	
YZ Leonis Minoris	7,000	0.01	White dwarf		
GW Librae	7,170	0.0103+0.0015 −0.0010	White dwarf		
WZ Sagittae	7,300	0.0105±0.0013	White dwarf		
MY Apodis	7,650	0.011±0.001	White dwarf		
OY Carinae A	7,650	0.011	White dwarf		
TMTS J0526+5934 A	7,650	0.011	White dwarf		
G 99-47	7,650	0.011	White dwarf		
EX Hydrae	7,650	0.011	White dwarf		
RX Andromedae	7,790	0.0112+0.0012 −0.0008	White dwarf		
van Maanen 2	7,860	0.01129 ± 0.00066	White dwarf	Third-closest white dwarf	
Stein 2051 B	7,930	0.0114±0.0004	White dwarf		
G 107-70 B	8,224	0.0118	White dwarf		
Ross 548 (ZZ Ceti)	8,209	0.0118±0.0002	White dwarf		
39 Ceti B (AY Ceti B)	8,350	0.012	White dwarf		
WD 1054−226	8,350	0.012±0.001	White dwarf		
Welopōʻai Ab	8,360 or 8,550	0.01201±0.0042 or 0.01229±0.0043	White dwarf		
Gliese 440	8,550	0.0123 ± 0.0009	White dwarf	Fourth-closest white dwarf	
Procyon B	8,585	0.01234±0.00032	White dwarf	Second-closest white dwarf	
GD 165 A	8,627	0.0124±0.0003	White dwarf		
Epsilon^{2} Arae C	8,627	0.0124±0.0003	White dwarf		
Welopōʻai B	8,634	0.01241 ± 0.00094	White dwarf		
WD 0806−661 (Maru)	8,860	0.0127	White dwarf	Has one confirmed exoplanet	
SW Ursae Majoris	8,975	0.0129+0.0009 −0.0010	White dwarf		
Epsilon Reticuli B	8,975–9,809	0.0129–0.0141	White dwarf		
G 29-38	8,975	0.0129	White dwarf		
AM Herculis A	9,040	0.013+0.0017 −0.0014	White dwarf		
40 Eridani B	9,100	0.01308±0.0002	White dwarf	First white dwarf to be discovered and the fifth-closest one.	
TY Coronae Borealis	9,110	0.0131±0.0014	White dwarf		
HD 147513 B	9,144	0.0131	White dwarf		
GD 358 (V777 Herculis)	9,170	0.0132	White dwarf		
Wolf 489	9,170	0.0132	White dwarf		
GALEX J2339−0424	9,253	0.0133±0.0008	White dwarf		
G 107-70 A	9,412	0.0135	White dwarf		
Wolf 1346	9,670	0.0139±0.0006	White dwarf		
WD 1032+011 A	10,230	0.0147±0.0013	White dwarf		
Gliese 318	10,300	0.0148	White dwarf		
RR Caeli A	10,909	0.01568±0.00009	White dwarf		
HL Tau 76	11,270	0.0162	White dwarf		
Mira B (VZ Ceti)	14,100	0.020	White dwarf	Based on the most likely mass estimate, 0.24±0.04 M_{☉}. Alternatively, it may have a mass of 0.42±0.02 M_{☉} with a radius of 0.015 R_{☉} (10,700 km).	
PG 1159-035	16,140 or 17,670	0.0232 or 0.0254±0.005	PG 1159 star (Pre-degenerate)	PG 1159 stars are pre-white dwarfs.	
WD 2226−210	17,390	0.025±0.001	White dwarf	Located in Helix Nebula	
WD 0032−317 A	18,510	0.0266±0.0012	White dwarf		
Feige 55	19,460	0.027965	White dwarf		(Note: Applying the Stefan–Boltzmann law with a nominal solar effective temperature of 5,772 K: $$\sqrt{\biggl(\frac{5,772}{58,280}\biggr)^4 \cdot 10^{0.91}} = 0.02796\ R_\odot$$.)
ZTF J1406+1222 B	20,200	0.029	Brown dwarf	A highly-irradiated brown dwarf with an orbital period of 62 minutes and a dayside surface temperature of 10,462 K, comparable to A-type stars such as Vega and Sirius.	
V906 Carinae A	20,900	0.03	White dwarf		
BE Ursae Majoris A	32,000	0.046±0.002	Subdwarf O star	Smallest known non-compact star.	
KPD 0005+5106	41,000	0.059+0.031 −0.018	Pre-white dwarf	Has one unconfirmed exoplanet	
AG Pegasi B	41,700	0.06	White dwarf	In a symbiotic binary with AG Peg A, has undergone many mass transfer events, varying in radius, luminosity and temperature.	
Regulus Ab	42,440	0.061±0.011	Pre-white dwarf		
PSR J0348+0432 B	45,220	0.065±0.005	White dwarf	Orbiting a pulsar.	
TMTS J0526+5934 B	45,990	0.0661±0.0054	Subdwarf B star		
WISEA 1810−1010	46,610	0.067+0.032 −0.02	Brown dwarf		

== 50,000 to 125,000 km ==
Partial list containing stars from 0.0718 to 0.18 R_{☉}.

Star name	Star radius, kilometres	Star radius, R_{☉}	Star class	Notes	References
SCR 1845−6357 B	50,000	0.0719±0.01	Brown dwarf		
SDSS 1624+00	52,200	0.075±0.001	Brown dwarf		
UGPS J0521+3640	52,900	0.076+0.004 −0.005	Brown dwarf		
DENIS 0255−4700	53,986	0.0776±0.0060	Brown dwarf	Faintest brown dwarf with a measured visual magnitude.	
SDSS J1007+1930	54,500	~0.078	Brown dwarf	Potential member of the Regulus system, which could be one of the most widely separated stellar systems. This brown dwarf is at 12.6 light-years from Regulus.	(Note: Calculated using surface gravity and mass, via the equation log(R/R_{☉}) = 2.22 + 0.5 • log(M/M_{☉}) − 0.5 • log(g).)
WD 0032−317 B	54,890	0.0789+0.0085 −0.0083	Brown dwarf	A highly irradiated brown dwarf with a dayside temperature hotter than the surface of Sun. Its dayside temperature measures 7,900 K (7,630 °C), while its nightside is much cooler, at 1,970 K (1,700 °C).	
2MASS 1507−1627	55,700	0.08	Brown dwarf		
Epsilon Indi Ba	55,700	0.08–0.081	Brown dwarf		
WISE J0623-0456	55,800 or 79,400	0.0802+0.0175 −0.0134 or 0.1141±0.0144	Brown dwarf		
LHS 6343 C	56,340	0.08098±0.00442	Brown dwarf		
HD 19467 B	56,500	0.0812+0.0012 −0.0013	Brown dwarf		
WISE 1534–1043	56,500	0.0812+0.0072 −0.0062	Brown dwarf	This object has a very fast and unusual transverse velocity, and is believed to be very old and metal-poor to explain such unusual velocity.	
Epsilon Indi Bb	57,050	0.082–0.083	Brown dwarf		
Wolf 1130 C	57,200	0.0822±0.0021	Brown dwarf		
WISE 0458+6434 A	57,700	0.0829+0.0008 −0.0007	Brown dwarf		
WISE 0458+6434 B	57,700	0.0829+0.0008 −0.0007	Brown dwarf		
54 Piscium B	57,900	0.0832±0.0021	Brown dwarf		
Gliese 229 Ba	57,910	0.08324+0.00514 −0.01233	Brown dwarf		
CWISEP J1446−2317	58,620	0.084±0.002	Brown dwarf		
EBLM J0555−57Ab	58,720	0.0844+0.0131 −0.006	Red dwarf	Smallest known red dwarf.	
Scholz's Star B	58,770	0.08447+0.0015 −0.0016	Brown dwarf	A nearby star that passed through the Solar System's Oort cloud 80,000 years ago.	
EPIC 201702477b	59,340	0.0853±0.0041	Brown dwarf		
2MASS J0415−0935	60,460	0.0869±0.0005	Brown dwarf		
GJ 1245 C	60,530	0.087±0.004	Red dwarf		
Gliese 229 Bb	60,770	0.0874+0.0123 −0.0051	Brown dwarf		
SSSPM J0829-1309	61,220	0.088±0.003	Red dwarf or Brown dwarf	An L2 dwarf that is fusing hydrogen. SSSPM J0829−1309 is one of the least luminous and massive hydrogen-fusing stars, and is smaller than Jupiter. However, it may be fusing lithium.	
HD 63754 B	61,500–67,900	0.0884–0.0976	Brown dwarf	Among the most massive brown dwarfs.	
HD 72946 B	61,500	0.0884	Brown dwarf		
2MASS J09393548−2448279 B	63,000	0.09	Brown dwarf		
CWISEP J1047+5457	62,900	0.090+0.002 −0.001	Brown dwarf		
WISE J2354+0240	62,900	0.090+0.002 −0.001	Brown dwarf		
WISEPA J031325.96+780744.2	62,900	0.090±0.002	Brown dwarf		
Gliese 570 D	63,629	0.09146+0.0051 −0.0041	Brown dwarf		
Gliese 758 B	63,600	0.0915+0.0031 −0.0021	Brown dwarf		
2MASS 0243−2453	64,004–73,744	0.092–0.106	Brown dwarf		
ZTF J1239+8347 B	64,300–100,000	0.092–0.144	Brown dwarf	Within a brown dwarf binary system with an orbital period of 57.41 minutes, a separation close enough for it to lose mass to the primary via an accretion disk.	
2MASS J0348−6022	64,700	0.093+0.016 −0.010	Brown dwarf		
WISE 0146+4234 A	65,270	0.0938+0.0024 −0.0026	Brown dwarf		
Kelu-1 B	65,400 to 72,500	0.094 to 0.104	Brown dwarf		(Note: Applying the Stefan–Boltzmann law with a nominal solar effective temperature of 5,772 K: $\sqrt{\biggl(\frac{5,772}{1,840}\biggr)^4 \cdot 10^{-3.95}} = 0.104\ R_\odot$$\sqrt{\biggl(\frac{5,772}{1,840}\biggr)^4 \cdot 10^{-4.04}} = 0.094\ R_\odot$.)
SCR 1845−6357 A	65,470	0.0941±0.0039	Red dwarf		
WISE 0146+4234 B	65,670	0.09944+0.0035 −0.0015	Brown dwarf		
SDSS J1416+1348 A	65,700	0.0945±0.0082	Brown dwarf		
Kelu-1 A	66,000 to 74,900	0.095 to 0.108	Brown dwarf		(Note: Applying the Stefan–Boltzmann law with a nominal solar effective temperature of 5,772 K: $\sqrt{\biggl(\frac{5,772}{2,020}\biggr)^4 \cdot 10^{-3.87}} = 0.095\ R_\odot$$\sqrt{\biggl(\frac{5,772}{2,020}\biggr)^4 \cdot 10^{-3.76}} = 0.108\ R_\odot$)
47 Ophiuchi C	66,500	0.0956±0.001	Brown dwarf		
WISE 1405+5534	66,500	0.0956±0.0010	Brown dwarf		
2MASS 0937+2931	67,200	0.0966±0.0164	Brown dwarf		
2MASS J1047+21	67,200	0.0966±0.0164	Brown dwarf		
CoRoT-15b	67,200	0.0966±0.0123	Brown dwarf		
SDSS J1416+1348 B	67,200	0.0966±0.0164	Brown dwarf		
WISE 0359−5401	67,200	0.0966±0.0021	Brown dwarf		
WISE 0734−7157	67,200	0.0966±0.0021	Brown dwarf		
WISE 2220−3628	67,200	0.0966±0.0014	Brown dwarf		
TVLM 513-46546	67,480–75,830	0.097–0.109	Brown dwarf	Has one confirmed exoplanet	
CWISEP J1935-1546	67,900	0.0976±0.0143	Brown dwarf		
Eta Coronae Borealis C	67,900	0.0976±0.0031	Brown dwarf		
WISE 2150−7520 B	67,900	0.0976±0.0164	Brown dwarf		
LHS 1070 C	68,180	0.098	Brown dwarf	Certainly a brown dwarf based on its mass.	
WASP-30B	68,670	0.0987±0.0031	Brown dwarf		
WASP-128B	68,670	0.0987±0.0021	Brown dwarf		
HD 33632 Ab	69,350	0.0997	Brown dwarf		
2MASS J0407+1546	69,570	0.100+0.024 −0.008	Brown dwarf		
2MASS J1219+3128	69,570	0.100+0.027 −0.013	Brown dwarf		
HD 114762 B	69,570	0.100	Red dwarf		
R Aquarii B	>70,000	>0.1	White dwarf	Makes a symbiotic binary with its companion R Aquarii A, a red giant.	
EBLM J0954−23	70,300	0.101±0.017	Red dwarf		
HD 130948 C	70,300	0.101±0.002	Brown dwarf		
KOI-189 B	70,470–71,800	0.1013–0.1032	Red dwarf		
Scholz's Star A	70,900	0.1019+0.0006 −0.0007	Red dwarf	A nearby star that passed through the Solar System's Oort cloud 80,000 years ago.	
Gliese 569 Bb	70,960	0.102±0.020	Brown dwarf	First brown dwarf ever discovered, together with its companion Gliese 569 Ba, which were thought to be a single astronomical body at the time.	
Luhman 16 A	70,960	0.102±0.005	Brown dwarf	Nearest brown dwarfs to Earth.	
Luhman 16 B	70,960	0.102±0.005	Brown dwarf	Nearest brown dwarfs to Earth.	
HD 28736 B	71,280	0.1025±0.0024	Brown dwarf		
15 Sagittae B	71,492	0.1028±0.0411	Brown dwarf		
HD 130948 B	71,492	0.1028±0.0010	Brown dwarf		
GD 165 B	71,492	0.1028±0.008	Brown dwarf		
2MASS 0036+1821	72,210	0.1038±0.0072	Brown dwarf		
2MASS J11145133−2618235	72,210	0.1038±0.0113	Brown dwarf		
LHS 1070 B	72,350	0.104	Brown dwarf	Likely a brown dwarf based on its mass.	
JADES-GD-BD-5	72,920–74,350	(0.1048–0.1069)^{+0.0031}_{−0.0041}	Brown dwarf	Most-distant known ultra-cool Y-dwarf, at 64 parsecs (210 ly), and with an effective temperature estimated at 301 or 305 K (28 or 32 °C; 82 or 89 °F).	
WD 1032+011 B	73,190	0.1052±0.01	Brown dwarf	A brown dwarf orbiting a white dwarf with an extremely low orbital period of 0.09 days (2.2 hours), both being tidally locked to each other.	
WISE 2150-7520 A	73,640	0.1058±0.0062	Brown dwarf		
BW Sculptoris B	73,640	0.1058±0.0051	Brown dwarf		
Ross 458 B	73,740	0.106±0.004	Red dwarf		
Ross 614 B	74,100	~0.107	Red dwarf		
LHS 2924	74,440	0.107	Red dwarf	Was the smallest known star at its discovery.	
WISE 0855−0714	74,690	0.1074 ± 0.0074	Brown dwarf	Coolest-known brown dwarf, at 276 K (3 °C; 37 °F).	(Note: Calculated, using the Stefan–Boltzmann law and the star's effective temperature and luminosity, with respect to the solar nominal effective temperature of 5,772 K: $$\sqrt{\biggl(\frac{5,772}{276}\biggr)^4 \cdot 10^{-7.22}} = 0.1074\ R_\odot.$$ One $R_\odot$ = 9.7311 R_{J}, so 9.7311 • 0.1074 = 1.045 R_{J}.)
DENIS J1048−3956	75,140	0.108	Red dwarf		
VZ Piscium B	75,800	0.1089±0.0041	Red dwarf	Also called NLTT 56936 B or HIP 115819 B.	
WISE 0607+2429	75,800	0.1089±0.0175	Brown dwarf		
WISE J2209+2711	75,800	0.1089±0.0010	Brown dwarf		
ESO 207-61	76,500	0.11±0.02	Brown dwarf	One of the first brown dwarfs to be identified.	
Kepler-39b	76,500	0.11±0.0031	Brown dwarf	Kepler-39 rotates rapidly with a rotation period of 1.6 hours and hence has an oblate shape, with its equator length being 22% larger than the poles.	
WISE J1206+8401	76,500	0.110±0.002	Brown dwarf		
CoRoT-3b	77,220	0.111±0.0051	Brown dwarf		
TOI-2119 B	77,220	0.111±0.0031	Brown dwarf		
2MASS 1237+6526	77,930	0.112±0.016	Brown dwarf	Has one unconfirmed exoplanet	
WISE J1122+25	77,930	0.112±0.016	Brown dwarf		
LHS 2065	78,610	0.113±0.006	Red dwarf		
WISE 0825+2805	79,310	0.114±0.002	Brown dwarf		
WISE J004945.61+215120.0	80,100	0.1151±0.0123	Brown dwarf		
2MASS J0523−1403	80,500	0.1157±0.0065	Red dwarf		
KELT-1B	80,770	0.1161±0.0031	Brown dwarf		
LHS 292	80,980	0.1164±0.0044	Red dwarf	Not to be confused with LHS 2924 (see above)	
WISE 1541−2250	81,470	0.117±0.002	Brown dwarf		
vB 10	82,300	0.1183+0.0059 −0.0057	Red dwarf		
2M1540	82,790	0.119	Red dwarf		(Note: Applying the Stefan–Boltzmann law with a nominal solar effective temperature of 5,772 K: $$\sqrt{\biggl(\frac{5,772}{2,621}\biggr)^4 \cdot 10^{-3.22}} = 0.11905\ R_\odot$$.)
EI Cancri B	82,790	0.119±0.021	Red dwarf		
Gliese 569 Ba	82,790	0.119±0.020	Brown dwarf	First brown dwarf ever discovered, together with its companion Gliese 569 Bb, which were thought to be a single astronomical body at the time.	
TRAPPIST-1	82,927	0.1192±0.0013	Red dwarf	Hosts a planetary system with seven confirmed planets.	
OGLE-TR-122B	83,480	0.120+0.024 −0.013	Red dwarf	Was the smallest known star from 2005 to 2013.	
Teegarden's Star	83,480	0.120±0.012	Red dwarf	Has three confirmed exoplanets	
G 196-3 B	84,400	0.1213±0.00719	Brown dwarf		
Königstuhl 1 B	84,400	0.1213±0.0021	Brown dwarf		
vB 8	84,458	0.1214+0.006 −0.0057	Red dwarf		
LS IV-14 116	84,900	0.122	Subdwarf B star		
SPECULOOS-3	85,600	0.123±0.0022	Red dwarf	Has one confirmed exoplanet	
ZTF J1239+8347 A	85,800	0.123+0.015 −0.011	Brown dwarf	Within a brown dwarf binary system with an orbital period of 57.41 minutes, a separation close enough for it to accrete mass from the secondary via an accretion disk.	
2MASS 0122-2439 B	85,800	0.123±0.021	Brown dwarf		
DX Cancri	85,920	0.1235±0.0006	Red dwarf		
Capotauro	86,480	0.124 ± 0.016	Brown dwarf	Previously suspected to be an extragalactic object, such as extremely old and distant galaxy based on a high photometric redshift, which formed only 90 million years after the Big Bang, a black hole star, or a dusty galaxy with a lower redshift and less extreme properties, or simply a Y-type brown dwarf within the Milky Way, which was confirmed to be true in 2026.	(Note: Calculated, using the Stefan–Boltzmann law and the star's effective temperature and luminosity, with respect to the solar nominal effective temperature of 5,772 K: $$\sqrt{\biggl(\frac{5,772}{350}\biggr)^4 \cdot 10^{-6.68}} = 0.124\ R_\odot.$$)
2MASS J09393548−2448279 A	87,200	0.125+0.010 −0.009	Brown dwarf		
VHS J1256–1257b	87,200	0.125	Brown dwarf		
LHS 2090	86,960	0.125±0.005	Red dwarf		
LHS 288	87,380	0.1256±0.0042	Red dwarf		
Gliese 412 B	87,797	0.1262±0.0054	Red dwarf		
OY Carinae B	88,350	0.127	Red dwarf		
AZ Cancri	88,630	0.1274±0.0195	Red dwarf		
AS Leonis Minoris B	90,400–355,000	0.13–0.51	White dwarf or Subdwarf B star	AS Leonis Minoris is an eclipsing binary system made up of a luminous red giant (45–170 R_{☉}) and a hot companion (AS LMi B). It has the longest period of any known eclipsing binary at 69 years.	
GJ 1245 B	90,400	0.13±0.007	Red dwarf		
Gliese 623 B	92,350	0.133 ± 0.008	Red dwarf		(Note: Calculated, using the Stefan–Boltzmann law and the star's effective temperature and luminosity, with respect to the solar nominal effective temperature of 5,772 K: $$\sqrt{\biggl(\frac{5,772}{2,840}\biggr)^4 \cdot 10^{-2.986}} = 0.133\ R_\odot.$$)
Gliese 105 C	92,460	0.1329+0.0057 −0.0055	Red dwarf		
Teide 1	93,700	0.1347+0.0123 −0.0077	Brown dwarf	First brown dwarf to be confirmed.	
CWISE J0506+0738	94,340	0.1356±0.0031	Brown dwarf		
EI Cancri A	94,620	0.136±0.020	Red dwarf		
Alpha Trianguli B	97,400	0.14	Red dwarf		
LHS 1070 A	97,400	0.14	Red dwarf		
HD 149382	99,500	0.143	Subdwarf B star		
EZ Aquarii A (Luyten 789-6 A)	99,500	0.143±0.022	Red dwarf		
EZ Aquarii B (Luyten 789-6 B)	99,500	0.143±0.022	Red dwarf		
Wolf 359	100,180	0.144±0.004	Red dwarf	Fifth-nearest star system to Earth.	
DENIS-P J1058.7−1548	101,500	0.1459±0.001	Brown dwarf		
GJ 1245 A	101,570	0.146±0.007	Red dwarf		
LP 944-20	102,900	0.1479±0.0144	Brown dwarf	Among the brightest brown dwarfs.	
Wolf 424 A	104,350	0.150±0.019	Red dwarf		
NY Virginis A	105,000	0.151±0.001	Subdwarf B star		
EX Hydrae B	105,300	0.1513	Red dwarf		
GJ 1061	105,750	0.152±0.007	Red dwarf	Has three confirmed exoplanets	
Wolf 424 B	106,440	0.153±0.019	Red dwarf		
2MASS J1115+1937	107,240	0.154±0.010	Brown dwarf		
85 Pegasi Bb	107,830	0.155	Red dwarf		
2M1510 A	109,400	0.157±0.003	Brown dwarf	The system has a candidate planet (2M1510 b) that orbits on a polar orbit, although it may be a false positive detection.	
2M1510 B	109,400	0.157±0.003	Brown dwarf	The system has a candidate planet (2M1510 b) that orbits on a polar orbit, although it may be a false positive detection.	
WISE 0535−7500	109,380	0.157±0.004	Brown dwarf	May be a binary system of two smaller brown dwarfs.	
2MASS J0249−0557 c	110,620	0.159±0.003	Brown dwarf		
Gliese 65 B (Luyten 726-8 B)	110,620	0.159±0.006	Red dwarf	The Gliese 65 system may host a Neptune-mass planet.	
LP 40-365	111,000	0.16±0.01	White dwarf	A white dwarf that might have formed in a type Iax supernova.	
HD 53143 B	111,310	0.160±0.005	Red dwarf		
NY Virginis B	111,310	0.16	Red dwarf		
GL Virginis	111,520	0.1603±0.0053	Red dwarf		
TZ Arietis (GJ 9066)	112,010	0.161±0.014	Red dwarf	Has one confirmed exoplanet	
Proxima Centauri	112,700	0.162±0.004	Red dwarf	The nearest extrasolar star. Has one confirmed planet, one candidate, and one disputed	
Gliese 65 A (Luyten 726-8 A)	114,790	0.165±0.006	Red dwarf	The Gliese 65 system may host a Neptune-mass planet.	
Kepler-451 B	116,880	0.168±0.001	Red dwarf		
YZ Ceti	116,880	0.168±0.009	Red dwarf	Has three confirmed exoplanets	
G 192-15	118,000	0.17±0.005	Red dwarf	Has two confirmed exoplanets	
HR 858 B	118,000	0.17±0.04	Red dwarf		
LP 791-18	118,000	0.17±0.018	Red dwarf	Has three confirmed exoplanets	
UY Sextantis	118,000	0.17±0.01	Subdwarf B star		
Z Andromedae B	118,000 to 250,000	0.17±0.03 to 0.36±0.06	White dwarf	Makes a symbiotic binary with its companion Z Andromedae A, a red giant.	
HIP 81208 Cb	122,100	0.175 ± 0.009	Brown dwarf		
AB Doradus C	124,000	0.178	Red dwarf	Among the least massive stars confirmed.	(Note: Applying the Stefan–Boltzmann law with a nominal solar effective temperature of 5,772 K: $$\sqrt{\biggl(\frac{5,772}{2,925}\biggr)^4 \cdot 0.0021} = 0.1784\ R_\odot$$.)
Gliese 22 B	124,530	0.179±0.009	Red dwarf		

== 125,000 to 200,000 km ==
Partial list containing stars from 0.18 to 0.287 R_{☉}.

Star name	Star radius, kilometres	Star radius, R_{☉}	Star class	Notes	References
Groombridge 34 B (Gliese 15 B)	125,230	0.18±0.03	Red dwarf		
HW Virginis A	127,310	0.183±0.026	Subdwarf B star		
HU Delphini A	128,010	0.184±0.004	Red dwarf		
Gliese 29 B	129,400	0.186±0.014	Red dwarf		
GJ 3323	129,540	0.1862±0.0059	Red dwarf	Has two confrirmed exoplanets	
Barnard's Star	130,100	0.187±0.001	Red dwarf	Second-nearest star system to the Solar System and the star with the highest proper motion. Has three confirmed exoplanets	
Alpha Mensae B	132,180	0.19±0.01	Red dwarf		
GJ 1128	132,000	0.190±0.014	Red dwarf		
Ross 248 (HH Andromedae)	132,180	0.19	Red dwarf		
Ross 128 (Gliese 447)	137,750	0.198±0.007	Red dwarf	Has one confirmed exoplanet	
Ross 154 (V1216 Sagittarii)	139,140	0.200±0.008	Red dwarf		
GJ 1062	140,500	0.202±0.012	Red subdwarf	Another size estimates include 0.372±0.076 R_{☉} and 0.411±0.051 R_{☉}.	
Kepler-70	141,200	0.203±0.007	Subdwarf B star	Has two unconfirmed exoplanets	
Kepler-451 A	141,200	0.203±0.001	Subdwarf B star	Possibly has two exoplanets.	
RR Caeli B	141,200—149,600	(0.203–0.215) ± 0.015	Red dwarf		
GJ 1214 (Orkaria)	141,920	0.204+0.0085 −0.0084	Red dwarf	Has one confirmed exoplanet	
LHS 1140	142,600	0.205±0.008	Red dwarf	Has two confirmed exoplanets	
Krüger 60 B	145,400	0.209±0.017	Red dwarf		
Ross 508	147,000	0.2113±0.0063	Red dwarf	Has one confirmed exoplanet	
GJ 1132	149,580	0.215±0.009	Red dwarf		
Gliese 268 B	151,660	0.218	Red dwarf		
Kepler-16 B	159,300	0.229±0.001	Red dwarf	Has one confirmed exoplanet	
Fomalhaut C	160,000	0.23 ± 0.01	Red dwarf		(Note: Calculated, using the Stefan–Boltzmann law and the star's effective temperature and luminosity, with respect to the solar nominal effective temperature of 5772 K: $$\sqrt{\biggl(\frac{5772}{3,132}\biggr)^4 \cdot 10^{-2.337}} = 0.23\ R_\odot.$$)
V391 Pegasi	160,000	0.23	Subdwarf B star	Has one unconfirmed exoplanet	
Kepler-1658 C	160,000	0.23	Red dwarf		
Gliese 777 B	160,710	0.231±0.025	Red dwarf		
Kepler-1649	161,190	0.2317±0.0049	Red dwarf	Has two confirmed exoplanets	
Eta Telescopii B	163,000	0.234±0.003	Brown dwarf		
Ross 47	165,580	0.238±0.009	Red dwarf		
Kepler-429	166,970	0.24	Subdwarf B star	Has three unconfirmed exoplanets	
V906 Carinae B	166,970	0.24	Red dwarf or Orange dwarf		
Gliese 268 A	168,360	0.242	Red dwarf		
CM Draconis B	171,000	0.2458±0.0010	Red dwarf		
PZ Telescopii B	173,900	0.25+0.03 −0.04	Brown dwarf		
DG Canum Venaticorum A	176,010	0.253	Red dwarf		
Ross 614 A	176,710	0.254±0.028	Red dwarf		
Gliese 625	177,400	0.255±0.034	Red dwarf		
Gliese 12	182,060	0.2617+0.0058 −0.0070	Red dwarf	Has one confirmed exoplanet	
CM Draconis A	183,530	0.2638±0.0011	Red dwarf		
2M1207 A	186,000	0.267	Brown dwarf		
HIP 79098 B	186,000	0.267±0.062	Brown dwarf		
BX Trianguli B	188,000	0.27±0.01	Red dwarf	Has one confirmed exoplanet	
V846 Arae B	188,000	0.27±0.04	Subdwarf O star		
Mu Herculis C	189,930	0.273±0.032	Red dwarf		
40 Eridani C	190,620	0.274±0.011	Red dwarf		
Struve 2398 B	194,800	0.280±0.005	Red dwarf		
Gliese 643	194,800	0.280±0.028	Red dwarf		
Gliese 402	197,580	0.284±0.011	Red dwarf		
GJ 3991 A	197,580	0.286±0.011	Red dwarf		
Epsilon Scorpii B	200,360	0.288±0.019	Red dwarf		
K2-28	200,360	0.288±0.028	Red dwarf	Has one confirmed exoplanet	

== 200,000 to 275,000 km ==
Partial list containing stars from 0.29 to 0.395 R_{☉}.

Star name	Star radius, kilometres	Star radius, R_{☉}	Star class	Notes	References
Gliese 105 B	201,060	0.289+0.012 −0.011	Red dwarf		
CoRoT-7 B	201,800	0.29	Red dwarf		
Mu Cassiopeiae Ab	201,800	0.29	Red dwarf		
AP Columbae	202,400	0.291±0.009	Red dwarf	The nearest pre-main sequence star to Earth.	
Kapteyn's Star (VZ Pictoris)	202,400	0.291±0.025	Red subdwarf	Closest halo star to the Sun. Previously believed to host an ancient planetary system with potential habitable planets.	
Stein 2051 A	203,100	0.292±0.031	Red dwarf		
K2-25	204,000	0.2932±0.0093	Red dwarf	Has one confirmed exoplanet	
HD 90089 B	207,300	0.298±0.008	Red dwarf		
HN Librae	208,000	0.299±0.009	Red dwarf	Has one confirmed exoplanet	
3 Puppis B	210,000	0.3	Hot subdwarf	This star is losing mass to the blue supergiant 3 Puppis A, this mass transfer generates a disk of circumstellar dust around the supergiant, which is unusual for an A-type star.	
LS Muscae B	~210,000	0.3±0.1	Subdwarf O star		
Krüger 60 A	209,400	0.301±0.015	Red dwarf		
Gliese 581	210,100	0.302±0.005	Red dwarf	Has three confirmed exoplanets	
G 9-40	210,520	0.3026±0.0095	Red dwarf	Has one confirmed exoplanet	
L 98-59	210,800	0.303+0.026 −0.023	Red dwarf	Has four confirmed exoplanets and one unconfirmed.	
EQ Pegasi B	210,800	0.303±0.013	Red dwarf		
LP 261-75 A	214,280	0.308±0.005	Red dwarf		
Luyten's Star (Gliese 273)	221,930	0.319±0.004	Red dwarf	Has two confirmed exoplanets and two unconfirmed.	
Wolf 1061	221,930	0.319±0.007	Red dwarf	Has three confirmed exoplanets	
GJ 3929	223,000	0.32±0.01	Red dwarf	Has two confrirmed exoplanets	
Xi Ursae Majoris Ab	223,000	0.32	Red dwarf		
K2-288 B	223,000	0.32±0.03	Red dwarf	Has one confirmed exoplanet	
Gliese 486 (Gar)	228,190	0.328±0.011	Red dwarf	Has one confirmed exoplanet	
YZ Canis Minoris	228,190	0.328±0.013	Red dwarf		
FU Tauri B	228,890	0.329±0.031	Brown dwarf		
LHS 1678	228,890	0.329±0.01	Red dwarf	Has three confirmed exoplanets	
Regulus C	231,000	0.332±0.023	Red dwarf		
AM Herculis B	230,000	0.33	Red dwarf		
Wolf 1130 A	230,000	0.33	Red dwarf	Nearest candidate for a supernova, a type Ia supernova.	
EV Lacertae	230,280	0.331±0.013	Red dwarf	On 25 April 2008, a record-setting stellar flare was observed on its surface by NASA's Swift, that was thousands of times more powerful than any solar flare.	
Gliese 667 C	234,450	0.337±0.014	Red dwarf	Has two confirmed exoplanets	
Gliese 357	235,290	0.3382+0.0093 −0.0087	Red dwarf	Has three confirmed exoplanets	
Aldebaran B	241,410	0.347±0.034	Red dwarf		
Struve 2398 A (Gliese 725 A)	244,200	0.351±0.003	Red dwarf	Has one confirmed exoplanet	
Gliese 251	253,230	0.364±0.001	Red dwarf		
2MASS 0122–2439 A	257,000	0.369 ± 0.048	Red dwarf		
HD 155876 B	257,000	0.37±0.07	Red dwarf		
HD 155876 A	257,000	0.37±0.07	Red dwarf		
Innes' star	258,100	0.371±0.012	Red dwarf		
Gliese 876 (IL Aquarii)	258,800	0.372±0.004	Red dwarf	Has four confirmed exoplanets. First red dwarf known to host exoplanets.	
LHS 6343 A	259,500	0.373±0.005	Red dwarf		
LTT 3780	260,190	0.374±0.011	Red dwarf	Has two confirmed exoplanets	
Gliese 22 A	261,580	0.376±0.018	Red dwarf		
TOI-270	262,970	0.378±0.011	Red dwarf		
Gliese 1	263,700	0.379±0.002	Red dwarf		
13 Ceti Ab	264,000	0.38	Red dwarf		
GQ Lupi B	264,000	0.38±0.072	Brown dwarf		
Groombridge 34 A (Gliese 15 A)	267,840	0.385±0.002	Red dwarf		
Gliese 412 A	272,710	0.398±0.009	Red dwarf		
Lalande 21185	272,710	0.392±0.004	Red dwarf		
LHS 6343 B	274,110	0.394±0.012	Red dwarf		

== 275,000 to 350,000 km ==
Partial list containing stars from 0.395 to 0.5 R_{☉}.

Star name	Star radius, kilometres	Star radius, R_{☉}	Star class	Notes	References
Gliese 570 C	277,300	0.399 ± 0.028	Red dwarf		(Note: Calculated, using the Stefan–Boltzmann law and the star's effective temperature and luminosity, with respect to the solar nominal effective temperature of 5772 K: $$\sqrt{\biggl(\frac{5772}{3304}\biggr)^4 \cdot 10^{-1.768}} = 0.399\ R_\odot.$$)
Asellus Primus B (Theta Boötis B)	279,180	0.4013±0.012	Red dwarf		
GJ 3293	281,100	0.404±0.027	Red dwarf		
Gliese 623 A	280,900	0.404 ± 0.024	Red dwarf		(Note: Calculated, using the Stefan–Boltzmann law and the star's effective temperature and luminosity, with respect to the solar nominal effective temperature of 5,772 K: $$\sqrt{\biggl(\frac{5,772}{3,400}\biggr)^4 \cdot 10^{-1.707}} = 0.404\ R_\odot.$$)
Alpha Trianguli C	282,500	0.406±0.012	Red dwarf		
Gliese 908 (Lalande 46650)	284,540	0.409±0.023	Red dwarf		
EQ Pegasi A	284,540	0.409±0.016	Red dwarf	Has one confirmed exoplanet	
Gliese 163	284,540	0.409+0.017 −0.016	Red dwarf		
SDSS J001820.5−093939.2	285,930	0.411+0.090 −0.011	F-type star	Among the most metal-poor stars.	
Gliese 806	288,300	0.4144±0.0038	Red dwarf	Has three confirmed exoplanets	
Gliese 317	290,110	0.4170±0.0013	Red dwarf	Has two confirmed exoplanets	
Gliese 687	291,290	0.4187^{+0.0066}_{−0.0063}	Red dwarf		
QS Virginis B	292,000	0.42±0.02	Red dwarf		
TOI-700	292,000	0.420±0.031	Red dwarf		
Gliese 180	294,210	0.4229±0.0047	Red dwarf	Has two confirmed exoplanets and one unconfirmed	
AD Leonis	294,490	0.4233±0.0057	Red dwarf		
Gliese 686	297,060	0.427±0.013	Red dwarf		
Chi Ceti Bb	298,460	0.429±0.017	Red dwarf		
GJ 3634	300,000	0.43±0.03	Red dwarf	Has one confirmed exoplanet	
Iota Ursae Majoris B	300,000	0.43	Red dwarf		
U Geminorum B	300,000	0.43±0.06	Red dwarf		
Gliese 436	300,540	0.432±0.011	Red dwarf	Has one confirmed exoplanet	
Gliese 393	300,540	0.432±0.025	Red dwarf		
Sigma Coronae Borealis C	304,020	0.437±0.020	Red dwarf		
Kappa^{1} Apodis B	306,000	0.44±0.06	Subdwarf O star		
WR 93b	306,000	0.44	Wolf-Rayet		
Gliese 832	307,500	0.442±0.018	Red dwarf		
Welopōʻai Aa	307,500	0.442±0.013	Red dwarf	Within a hierarchical triple star system with two white dwarf companions; the nearest triple-star system with multiple white dwarfs.	
Alpha Caeli B	313,000	0.45	Red dwarf		
K2-288 A	313,000	0.45±0.03	Red dwarf		
Gliese 367 (Anañuca)	317,930	0.457±0.013	Red dwarf	Has three confirmed exoplanets	
Gliese 588	320,000	0.46±0.019	Red dwarf		
Iota Ursae Majoris C	320,000	0.46	Red dwarf		
HD 147379 B	320,000	0.460±0.008	Red dwarf		
Gliese 849	322,800	0.464±0.018	Red dwarf		
BAT99-123 (Brey 93)	327,000	0.47	Wolf-Rayet		
Gliese 176	329,760	0.474±0.015	Red dwarf		
Lacaille 9352	329,760	0.474±0.008	Red dwarf		
Gliese 526	333,240	0.479±0.055	Red dwarf		
Tau Boötis B	333,900	0.48±0.05	Red dwarf		
Gliese 752 A	334,630	0.481±0.014	Red dwarf		
UScoCTIO 108 A	336,720	0.484	Brown dwarf		(Note: Applying the Stefan–Boltzmann law with a nominal solar effective temperature of 5,772 K: $$\sqrt{\biggl(\frac{5,772}{2,700}\biggr)^4 \cdot 10^{-1.95}} = 0.484\ R_\odot$$.)
UX Ursae Majoris B	345,070–484,900	0.496–0.697	Red dwarf		
Theta Persei Ab	346,500	0.498±0.017	Red dwarf		
TOI-2119	347,900	0.500±0.015	Red dwarf		
Kappa Reticuli B	348,000	0.50	Red dwarf		
h Orionis B	348,000	0.50	Red dwarf		
HIP 30886 B	348,000	0.50	Red dwarf		
Gamma Aquarii Ab	348,000	0.50	Red dwarf		

== Smallest stars by type ==
List of the smallest stars by star type
Type	Star name	Radius Solar radii (Sun = 1)	Radius Jupiter radii (Jupiter = 1)	Radius Earth radii (Earth = 1)	Radius (km / mi)	Date	Notes	References
Red dwarf	EBLM J0555−57Ab	0.084	0.84	9.41	60,000 km (37,000 mi)	2017	The red dwarf stars are considered the smallest stars known, and representative of the smallest star possible.	
Brown dwarf	ZTF J1406+1422 B	0.029	0.282	3.16	20,200 kilometres (12,600 mi)	2022	Brown dwarfs are not massive enough to build up the pressure in the central regions to allow nuclear fusion of hydrogen into helium. They are best described as extremely massive gas giants that were not able to ignite into a hydrogen-fusing star.	
White dwarf	RE J0317-853	0.0032	0.031	0.35	2,230 km (1,390 mi)	2026 (Note: ZTF J1901+1458 had a smaller size estimate of 2,140 km in 2021, but revised upwards to 2,664 km in 2026.)	White dwarfs are stellar remnants produced when a star with around 8 solar masses or less sheds its outer layers into a planetary nebula. The leftover core becomes the white dwarf. It is thought that white dwarfs cool down over quadrillions of years to produce a black dwarf.	
Neutron star	RX J0720.4−3125	0.0000064683 – 0.0000077332	0.00006294 – 0.00007525	0.0007055 – 0.0008435	4.50+0.08 −0.09 – 5.38+0.13 −0.14	2012	Neutron stars are stellar remnants produced when stars with around 9 solar masses or more explode in supernovae at the ends of their lives. They are usually produced by stars with less than 20 solar masses, although a more massive star may produce a neutron star in certain cases.	

=== Timeline of smallest red dwarf star recordholders ===
Red dwarfs are considered the smallest stars known that are active fusion stars, and are the smallest stars possible that is not a brown dwarf.

List of smallest red dwarf titleholders
Star name	Date	Radius Solar radii (Sun = 1)	Radius Jupiter radii (Jupiter = 1)	Radius km (mi)	Notes
EBLM J0555−57Ab	2017–present	0.084	0.84	60,000 km (37,000 mi)	This star has a size comparable to that of Saturn.
2MASS J0523−1403	2013–2017	0.102	1.01	70,600 km (43,900 mi)	Lowest mass main sequence star as of 2020.
OGLE-TR-122B	2005–2013	0.117	1.16	81,100 km (50,400 mi)	
