= LHS 2065 =

Red dwarf star in the constellation Hydra

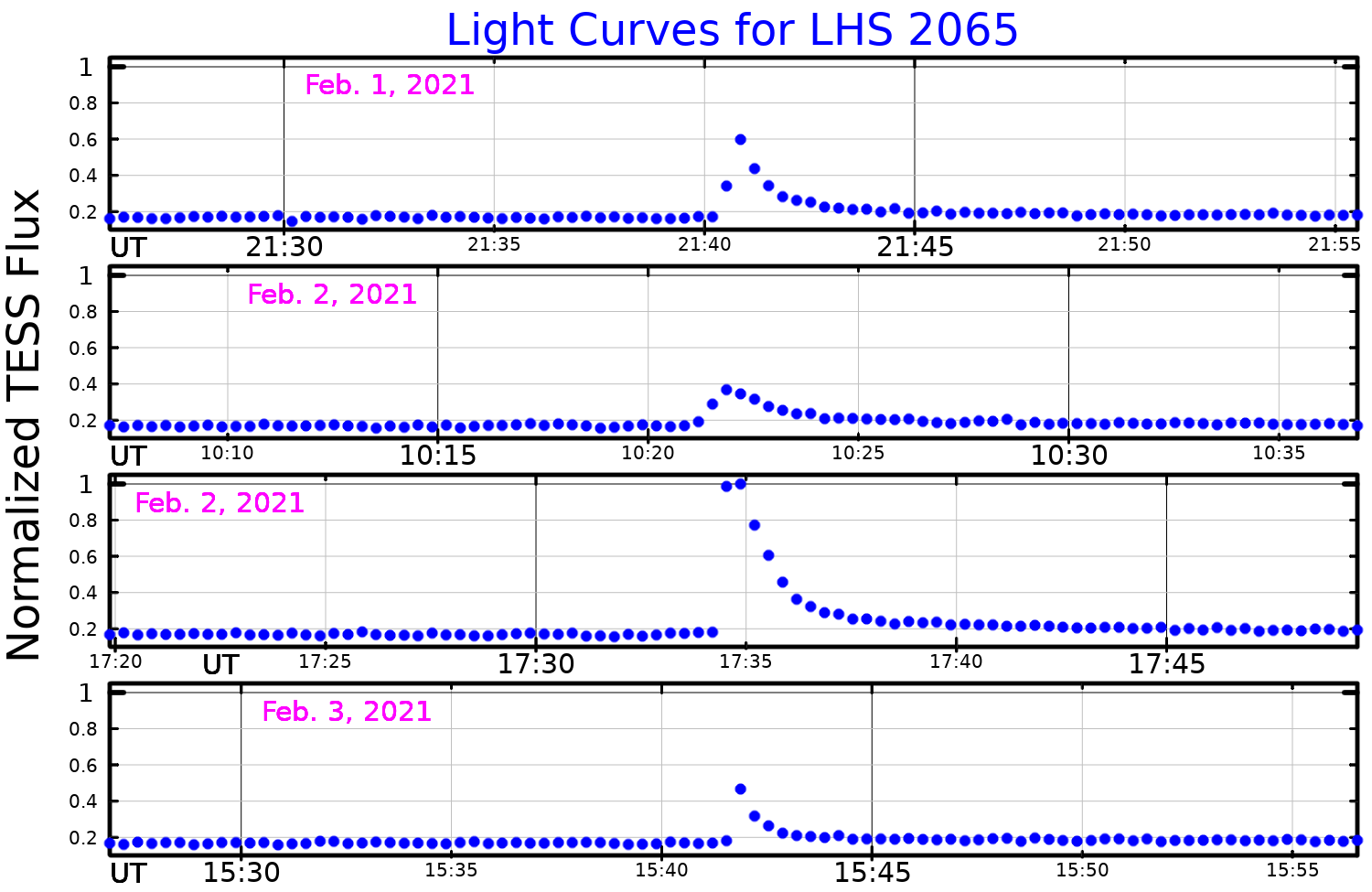
- Light curves showing four flares on LHS 2065, plotted from TESS data

Observation data Epoch J2000 Equinox J2000
- Constellation: Hydra
- Right ascension: 08^{h} 53^{m} 36.16047^{s}
- Declination: −03° 29′ 32.1975″
- Apparent magnitude (V): +18.959

Characteristics
- Evolutionary stage: main sequence
- Spectral type: M9V
- Variable type: Flare star

Astrometry
Radial velocity (R_{v})	7±2 km/s
Proper motion (μ)	RA: −516.605 mas/yr Dec.: −199.652 mas/yr
Parallax (π)	115.4876±0.0726 mas
Distance	28.24 ± 0.02 ly (8.659 ± 0.005 pc)

Details
Mass	0.082±0.002 M_{☉}
Radius	0.113±0.006 R_{☉}
Luminosity	3.39+0.16 −0.15×10^{−4} L_{☉}
Surface gravity (log g)	~5.5 cgs
Temperature	2,317+61 −56 K
Age	>0.5 Gyr

Other designations
- GJ 3517, LHS 2065, LP 666-9, TIC 7975441, 2MASS J08533619-0329321

Database references
SIMBAD	data

LHS 2065 is a red dwarf star, one of the smallest stars ever found with around 8.2% the mass of the Sun and a diameter only 10% greater than Jupiter. It is one of the few ultracool dwarfs known to have flare activity, emitting one flare every 33 hours, and is also an active X-ray emitter.

Parallax measurements by the Gaia spacecraft give a distance of 8.66 parsecs (28.2 ly) to LHS 2065. This star was first recorded by the Luyten Half-Second catalogue, a catalogue of stars with proper motions exceeding 0.5". The star's main identifier is named after this catalogue. It is located in the constellation Hydra.

This star has a spectral type of M9V, indicating a very cool star on the main sequence. It is among the nearest ultracool dwarfs to Earth. LHS 2065 has an effective temperature of around 2,317 K, 2.5 times less than the Sun. The lack of lithium in the star's atmosphere indicate that it must be over 500 million years old.

== See also ==
- LHS 2924
- vB 10
- Brown dwarf
