= TMTS J0526+5934 =

Smallest known Hydrogen-Burning (Main Sequence) Star

- Location of TMTS J0526+5934

Observation data Epoch J2000.0 Equinox J2000.0
- Constellation: Camelopardalis
- Right ascension: 05^{h} 26^{m} 10.42^{s}
- Declination: +59° 34′ 45.3″
- Apparent magnitude (V): 17.76

Characteristics

White dwarf
- Evolutionary stage: White dwarf

Subdwarf
- Evolutionary stage: subdwarf
- Spectral type: sdB

Astrometry
Proper motion (μ)	RA: +1.418 mas/yr Dec.: +0.781 mas/yr
Parallax (π)	1.1826±0.0217 mas
Distance	2,760 ± 50 ly (850 ± 20 pc)

Orbit
Period (P)	20.5062426(53) min
Semi-major axis (a)	0.255 R_{☉}
Eccentricity (e)	0 (assumed)
Inclination (i)	68.2+3.7 −5.2°

Details

A
Radius	0.011 R_{☉}

B
Mass	~0.33 M_{☉}
Radius	0.0661±0.0054 R_{☉}
Luminosity	1.70+0.31 −0.24 L_{☉}
Surface gravity (log g)	6.36 cgs
Temperature	25,480 K

Other designations
- TMTS J052610.43+593445.1, ZTF J0526+5934

Database references
SIMBAD	data

TMTS J0526+5934 (abbreviated from TMTS J052610.43+593445.1 or ZTF J0526+5934) is an ultracompact binary star system located approximately 2,760 light-years away in the constellation Camelopardalis. It was initially identified in 2019 by the Zwicky Transient Facility (ZTF) as an extremely low-mass (ELM) white dwarf candidate, with further observations refining its classification.

== Discovery ==
Discovered by ZTF, it was further studied by the Tsinghua University–Ma Huateng Telescopes for Survey (TMTS), leading to its TMTS designation.

== Characteristics ==
It consists of a hot subdwarf B (sdB) star (J0526B) and a carbon-oxygen white dwarf (CO WD) companion (J0526A), forming a detached double white dwarf (DWD) binary, the fifth object with ultra-short period. It holds the record for the shortest known orbital period of a detached single-degenerate binary at 20.5062426±0.0000053 min. The subdwarf B star has an estimated radius of 0.0661±0.0054 R_{☉}, representing possibly the smallest non-degenerate star known.

== Evolution and Future ==
TMTS J0526+5934 is expected to merge due to gravitational wave emission in about 1.8–3 million years. The merger could result in a massive white dwarf of roughly solar mass, a helium-rich star, or potentially a Type Ia supernova. Its strong gravitational wave signal makes it a promising verification binary for the ESA's Laser Interferometer Space Antenna (LISA) mission.

== See also ==
- Lists of stars
- List of smallest known stars
- Lists of astronomical objects
