= HD 63754 =

Star in the constellation Puppis with a brown dwarf companion

- Approximate location of HD 63754 (next to HD 63822)

Observation data Epoch J2000 Equinox J2000
- Constellation: Puppis
- Right ascension: 07^{h} 49^{m} 45.26437^{s}
- Declination: −20° 12′ 27.4778″
- Apparent magnitude (V): +6.55

Characteristics

A
- Evolutionary stage: Main sequence
- Spectral type: G0V

B
- Evolutionary stage: Brown dwarf
- Spectral type: L/T

Astrometry
Radial velocity (R_{v})	45.03±0.12 km/s
Proper motion (μ)	RA: −33.726 mas/yr Dec.: −125.768 mas/yr
Parallax (π)	19.9317±0.0201 mas
Distance	163.6 ± 0.2 ly (50.17 ± 0.05 pc)
Absolute magnitude (M_{V})	3.03±0.05

Orbit
Period (P)	73.4+16 −9.4 yr
Semi-major axis (a)	19.9+2.7 −1.6 AU
Eccentricity (e)	0.260+0.065 −0.059
Inclination (i)	174.81+0.48 −0.50°
Longitude of the node (Ω)	40.2+8.1 −7.1°
Argument of periastron (ω) (secondary)	311+28 −271°

Details

A
Mass	1.41±0.15 M_{☉}
Radius	2.122±0.043 R_{☉}
Luminosity	5.061±0.011 L_{☉}
Surface gravity (log g)	4.04±0.06 cgs
Temperature	6,088±32 K
Metallicity [Fe/H]	+0.2±0.03 dex
Age	>3.4 Gyr

B
Mass	81.9+6.4 −5.8 M_{Jup}
Radius	0.86±0.02 – 0.95±0.05 R_{Jup}
Luminosity	2.82+0.57 −0.47×10^{−5} L_{☉}
Surface gravity (log g)	5.3±0.02 – 5.43±0.02 cgs
Temperature	1,344±71 – 1,413±177 K
Age	4.7+2.9 −1.1 – 6.4+4.3 −3.1 Gyr

Other designations
- BD−19 2085, HD 63754, HIP 38216, HR 3048, TYC 5989-2216-1, 2MASS J07494527-2012272

Database references
SIMBAD	data

HD 63754, also known as HR 3048, is a G-type dwarf star, located in the constellation Puppis some 164 light-years away. It is orbited by a brown dwarf companion.

== Characteristics ==
The stellar classification of HR 3048 is G0V, meaning that it is a main-sequence star fusing atoms of hydrogen into helium at its core. It has 1.41 times the mass of the Sun, 2.1 times the radius of the Sun, as well as five times its luminosity. This star appears slightly evolved as a main sequence star, and has an age estimated to be higher than 3.4 billion years. The surface of HD 63754 has a temperature of 6,088 K, giving it a yellow-white hue typical of early G-type stars. It is metal-enriched, with an abundance of iron 60% larger than that of the Sun.

Its apparent magnitude of 6.55 means that it is slightly below the limit for naked eye visibility of 6.5^{m}. This limit, however, depends on many factors such as pupil dilatation and light pollution. While HD 63754 is not naked-eye visible in most skies, it may be visible using a small telescope or binoculars instead.

== Motion ==
HD 63754 is approximately 160 light-years from Earth and is estimated to be at least 3.4 billion years old. The space velocity components of this star are U = −6, V = −50 and W = −20. It is orbiting the Milky Way with a minimum distance of 5,550 pc (18,100 light-years) and a maximum distance of 8,030 pc (26,200 light-years) from the Galactic Center. Its orbit lies no more than 200 pc (650 light-years) from the galactic plane.

== Substellar companion ==
In 2024, the presence of a substellar companion to HD 63754 was announced, based on direct imaging observations from the Near Infrared Camera 2 at the Keck Observatory, as well as astrometric observations. This companion, named HD 63754 B, is a brown dwarf at a distance of 20 astronomical units from its host, completing an orbit around it every 73 years. The orbit has a low eccentricity of 0.26 and an almost face-on inclination of 175°.

The dynamical mass of the companion is measured at 82 times the mass of Jupiter. This place it at the edge of the hydrogen burning limit – the dividing line between brown dwarfs and stars. Its effective temperature is of 1,340–1,410 K, consistent with an object between the spectral types L and T. The luminosity and temperature indicate that it is a brown dwarf rather than a low-mass star. Despite its large mass, HD 63754 B is smaller than Jupiter, with 0.86–0.95 times its radius.

HD 63754 B appears to be more massive than expected. Evolutionary models predict a mass of 66 to 75 M_{J}, in disagreement with the dynamical mass estimate of 82 M_{J}. The reason for this discrepancy is not well known but there are three scenarios to explain it. The first scenario is that HD 63754 B has a binary companion emitting little infrared radiation, with a low mass ratio. The second scenario is that there are additional companions to HD 63754, that have not been detected during the direct imaging observations. The third scenario is that there are systematic problems with the evolutionary models used.

== See also ==
- List of brown dwarfs
- List of smallest stars
