= WISE J004945.61+215120.0 =

Star in the constellation Andromeda

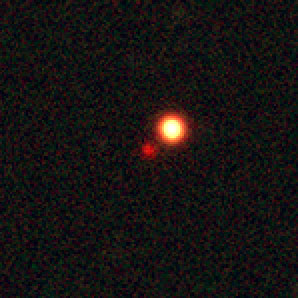
- WISE J004945.61+215120.0 is the faint red dot in the middle of the image Credit: legacy surveys

Observation data Epoch J2000 Equinox J2000
- Constellation: Andromeda
- Right ascension: 00^{h} 49^{m} 46.09^{s}
- Declination: 21° 51′ 20.4″

Characteristics
- Spectral type: T8.5

Astrometry
Proper motion (μ)	RA: −479.4 mas/yr Dec.: −54.0 mas/yr
Parallax (π)	140.4±2.1 mas
Distance	23.2 ± 0.3 ly (7.1 ± 0.1 pc)

Other designations
- WISE J004945.61+215120.0

Database references
SIMBAD	data

WISE J004945.61+215120.0 is a brown dwarf of spectral class T8.5, located in constellation Andromeda at approximately 24 light-years from Earth.

== Discovery ==
WISE J004945.61+215120.0 was discovered in 2012 by Mace et al. from data, collected by Wide-field Infrared Survey Explorer (WISE) Earth-orbiting satellite — NASA infrared-wavelength 40 cm (16 in) space telescope, which mission lasted from December 2009 to February 2011. In 2013, the discovery paper was published.

== Distance ==
Currently the most accurate distance estimate of WISE J004945.61+215120.0 is a trigonometric parallax, published in 2019 by Kirkpatrick et al.: 7.1+0.1
−0.1 pc, or 23.3+0.4
−0.4 ly.
