= 2MASS J01225093−2439505 =

M-Type main sequence star in the constellation Cetus

Observation data Epoch J2000 Equinox J2000
- Constellation: Cetus
- Right ascension: 01^{h} 22^{m} 50.9353^{s}
- Declination: −24° 39′ 50.6933″
- Apparent magnitude (V): 14.24±0.07

Characteristics
- Evolutionary stage: main-sequence star
- Spectral type: M3.5V

Astrometry
| Proper motion (μ) | RA: 120.215 mas/yr Dec.: −123.561 mas/yr |
| Parallax (π) | 29.6409±0.0273 mas |
| Distance | 110.0 ± 0.1 ly (33.74 ± 0.03 pc) |

Details
| Mass | 0.4 M_{☉} |
| Radius | 0.369 R_{☉} |
| Luminosity | 0.019 L_{☉} |
| Temperature | 3530±50 K |
| Rotation | 1.49±0.02 d |
| Age | 0.12 Gyr |

Other designations
- TIC 11614485, 2MASS J01225093−2439505, Gaia DR2 5040416186560252416

Database references
| SIMBAD | data |

2MASS J01225093−2439505 is a M-type main-sequence star. Its surface temperature is 3530±50 K. 2MASS J01225093−2439505 is much younger than the Sun at an age of 0.12 billion years (120 Million years). Kinematically, the star belongs to the AB Doradus moving group.

Multiplicity surveys did not detect any stellar companions to 2MASS J01225093−2439505 as of 2016.

== Planetary system ==
In 2013, one superjovian planet (may be a brown dwarf), named 2MASS J01225093−2439505 b, was discovered by direct imaging. The measured planetary temperature is 1600±100 K, and it exhibits an unusual, short-lived atmospheric dust type due to its relatively low surface gravity and young age. The planetary spectrum is classified as L3.7±1.0. The planetary rotation axis is inclined to its orbit, obliquity is 33^{+17}_{−9}°, while the orbit is well aligned with the equatorial plane of the star, misalignment is 1^{+28}_{−1}°. The planet is rotating rapidly, with a period of 6.8±1.8 hours.

The 2MASS J01225093−2439505 planetary system
| Companion (in order from star) | Mass | Semimajor axis (AU) | Orbital period (days) | Eccentricity | Inclination (°) | Radius |
|---|---|---|---|---|---|---|
| b | 19.5±7.5 M_{J} | 50 | — | — | 103^{+16}_{−6} | 1.04±0.18 R_{J} |
