= YZ Leonis Minoris =

Stellar system in the constellation Leo Minor

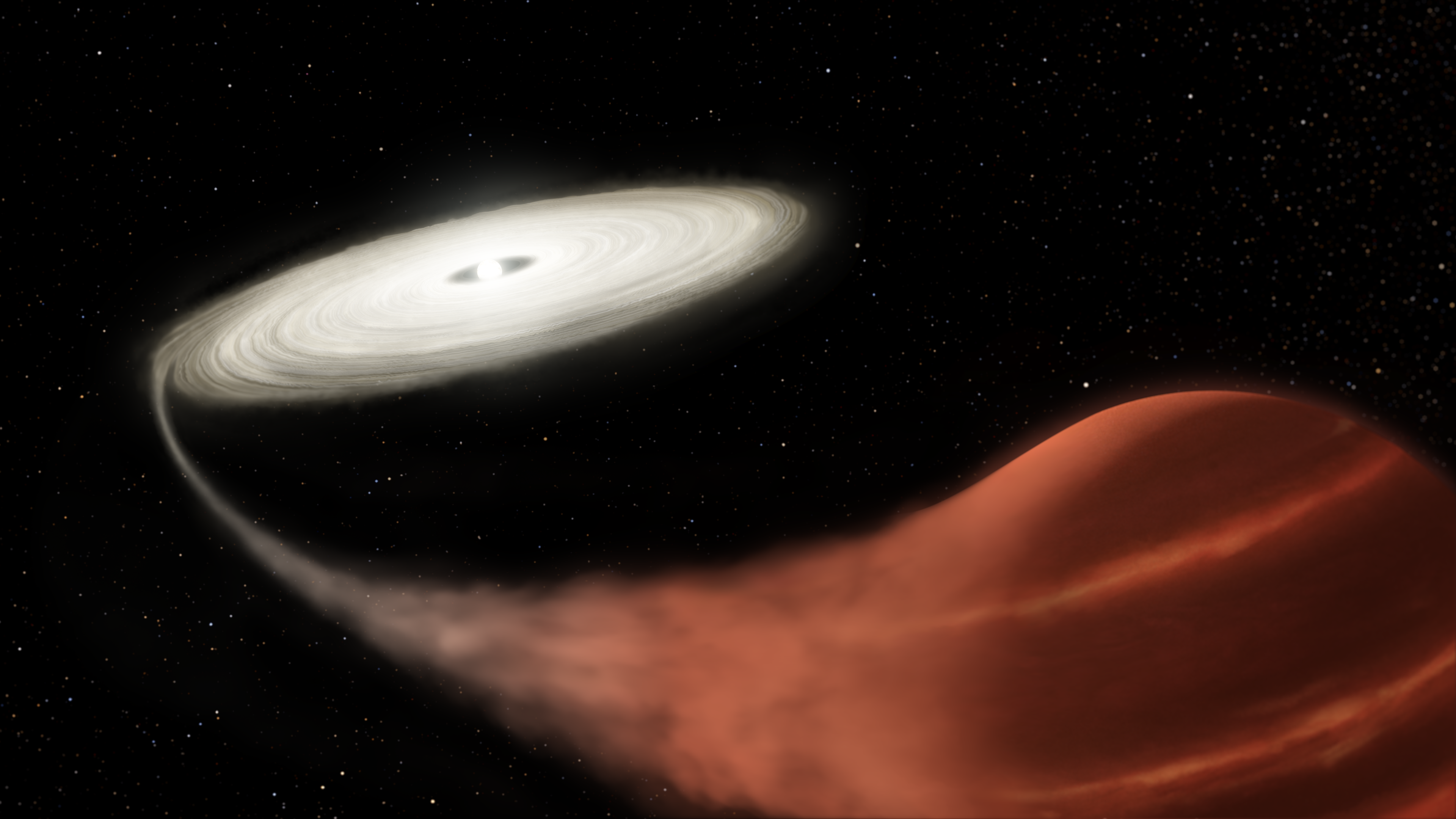
- Illustration of a system with a accreting white dwarf and a low-mass donor companion, similar to YZ Leonis Minoris

Observation data Epoch J2000 Equinox J2000
- Constellation: Leo Minor
- Right ascension: 09^{h} 26^{m} 38.725^{s}
- Declination: 36° 24′ 02.456″
- Apparent magnitude (V): 19.33±0.31 (mean) (Note: During the outbursts, the apparent magnitude increases to 17.11–16.82.) (Note: The apparent magnitude of the system decreases in about two magnitudes due to eclipses.)

Characteristics
- Evolutionary stage: White dwarf
- Spectral type: DB
- Apparent magnitude (G): 19.27
- Variable type: AM Canum Venaticorum; Eclipsing binary SU Ursae Majoris

Donor companion
- Evolutionary stage: Helium-rich star

Astrometry
Proper motion (μ)	RA: −31.6±0.203 mas/yr Dec.: −3.672±0.112 mas/yr
Parallax (π)	1.227±0.208 mas
Distance	2657±450 ly (815±138 pc)

Orbit
Primary	A
Period (P)	28.3 minutes
Semi-major axis (a)	0.29 R_{☉}
Inclination (i)	83.1±0.1°

Details

White dwarf
Mass	0.79–0.89 M_{☉}
Radius	0.01 R_{☉}
Radius	6,957 km
Luminosity	0.00946–0.0352 (Note: From R = sqrt((((5772)/(T)))^(4)*L), where R is the radius, T is the effective temperature and L is the luminosity. Temperatures of 18,000 and 25,000 K are used, together with a radius of 0.01 R_{☉}.) L_{☉}
Surface gravity (log g)	8.3 cgs
Temperature	18,000–25,000 K

Donor companion
Mass	0.027–0.038 M_{☉}
Radius	0.043 R_{☉}
Luminosity	0.00035 (Note: From R = sqrt((((5772)/(T)))^(4)*L), where R is the radius, T is the effective temperature and L is the luminosity. A temperature of 3,800 K is used, together with a radius of 0.043 R_{☉}.) L_{☉}
Surface gravity (log g)	5.6 cgs
Temperature	3,570±130 K

Other designations
- SDSS J0926+3624, YZ LMi, WD J092638.72+362402.46, Gaia DR2 798764346831516032, SDSS J092638.71+362402.4

Database references
SIMBAD	data

YZ Leonis Minoris, also known as SDSS J0926+3624, is a star system in the constellation Leo Minor. It is an AM Canum Venaticorum-type variable star, a type of binary systems with ultra-short periods (between 5 and 70 minutes). It is also an eclipsing binary. The apparent magnitude of the system is generally 19.3^{m}, varying by about two magnitudes due to periodic eclipses and outbursts. The distance to YZ LMi is 815 pc (2,660 ly).

== Characteristics ==
YZ Leonis Minoris is made up of a white dwarf star and a low-mass donor companion. The white dwarf accretes matter from the companion via a helium-rich accretion disk. The disk around the white dwarf has a size ranging from 18,000 to 90,800 km, which is about 45% of the orbital separation of the components. (Note: The internal size of the disk was found by multiplying 1.2 by the diameter of the main star. The outer size of the disk was found by multiplying 0.45 by the diameter of the two stars' orbits. The diameter of the stars' orbit can be found by adding the separation of the component surfaces (167,000 km) with the radii of the system's components (6950 and 29915 km respectively.) This results in 203,865.1 km, which multiplied by 0.45 results in 91.739km.) The temperature of the disk varies from 5,000 K (in the outer parts of the disk) to 23,000 K (in the inner parts of the disk).

YZ Leonis Minoris is a very compact system. The orbital period of the stars is just 28 minutes, making it the eclipsing binary system with the shortest orbital period. The components are separated at a distance of 0.29 solar radii (200,000 km), and the surface-to-surface distance is 167,000 km. It is both an AM Canum Venaticorum variable and an eclipsing variable (eclipsing binary). The white dwarf is partially eclipsed by its donor companion.

The system has a normal apparent magnitude of 19.33^{m}, which is far lower than the limit for naked-eye vision (6.5^{m}), making it not visible to the naked eye. A recent estimate from Gaia DR3 gives a distance of 815 pc (2,660 ly) for YZ Leonis Minoris, which is significantly larger than previous estimates (of 460–470 pc).

=== White dwarf ===
The primary component of the system is a white dwarf. It has a mass between 0.79 and 0.89 M_{☉} and a radius of 0.01 R_{☉} (1.09 R_{🜨}). The white dwarf's surface gravity is about 200,000 times stronger than Earth's gravity. (Note: Based on the log(g) of 8.3, which is later divided by 980.665.) Its effective temperature is estimated to be at least 17,000 K, and Sengupta et al. (2011) found three temperatures between 18,000 and 25,000 K. Its luminosity is about 0.009–0.035 times the solar luminosity. The white dwarf is accreting mass from the companion at a rate of 10^{−10} solar masses per year, based on evolutionary models.

=== Low-mass companion ===
The secondary component of the system has a low mass, estimated to be between 0.027 and 0.038 M_{☉} (28.3 and 39.8 M_{J}) and its radius is estimated at 0.043 solar radii (29,900 km). The mass of the companion makes it semi-degenerate; it would be fully degenerate if it had a mass close to 0.02 M_{☉}. Its temperature is estimated to be 3,570 K (3,300 °C), with an upper limit of 3,700 K (3,430 °C). The luminosity of the companion is 0.00035 times the solar luminosity.

== Variability ==
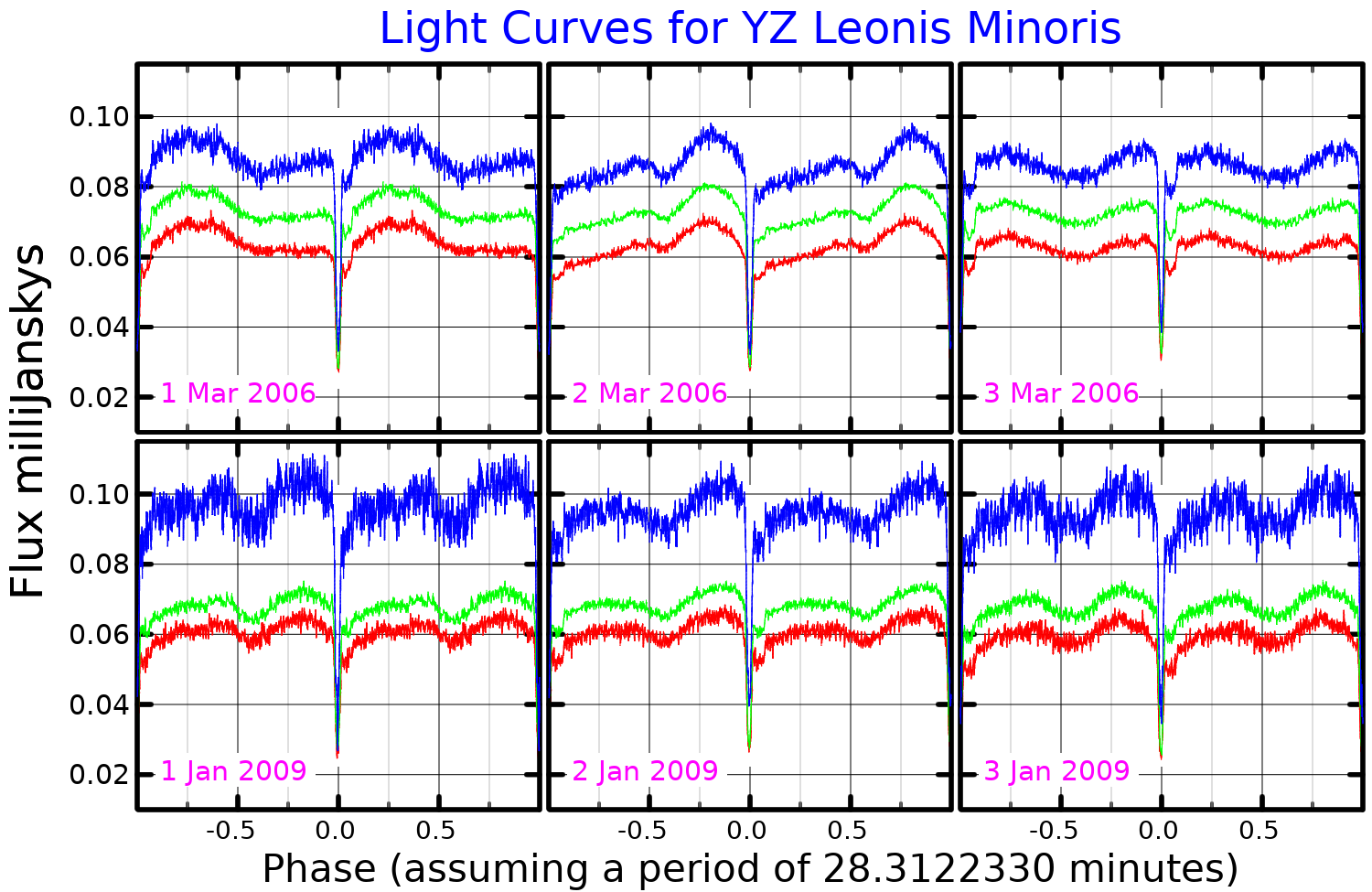
Light curves for YZ Leonis Minoris in three photometric colors: red, green and ultraviolet (plotted as blue). Adapted from Copperwheat et al. 2011.

Artist's impression of an eclipsing binary.

SDSS J0926+2634 is an AM Canum Venaticorum-type variable star, which is a type of cataclysmic variable system that are ultracompact and deficient in hydrogen, with orbital periods of just a few minutes. It is also an eclipsing binary, a type of binary stars where the components eclipse each other, causing variation in the apparent brightness. The American Association of Variable Star Observers also mentions YZ Leonis Minoris as a SU Ursae Majoris-type star (dwarf nova). YZ Leonis Minoris was the first system discovered that is both an eclipsing binary and an AM Canum Venaticorum star. As of 2022, more than 8 such systems are known.

The system presents eclipses every 28 minutes, which decrease the system's apparent magnitude by two magnitudes and last about two minutes, in addition to presenting outbursts that make the system's apparent magnitude increase by up to two magnitudes. YZ Leonis Minoris' mean apparent magnitude is 19.33^{m}, brightening to between 17.11 and 16.81 during the outbursts. These outbursts happen every 100–200 days and are likely generated by bursts of enhanced mass transfer from donor star to the white dwarf.

YZ Leonis Minoris is the variable-star designation of the system.

== Discovery ==
YZ Leonis Minoris was discovered in 2005 by Anderson et al. in a search for spectroscopically unusual objects, after an examination of spectra of 280,000 SDSS objects. It was discovered together with three other objects: SDSS J0129+3842, SDSS J1411+4812, and SDSS J1552+3201.
