= HD 130948 =

Star in the constellation Boötes

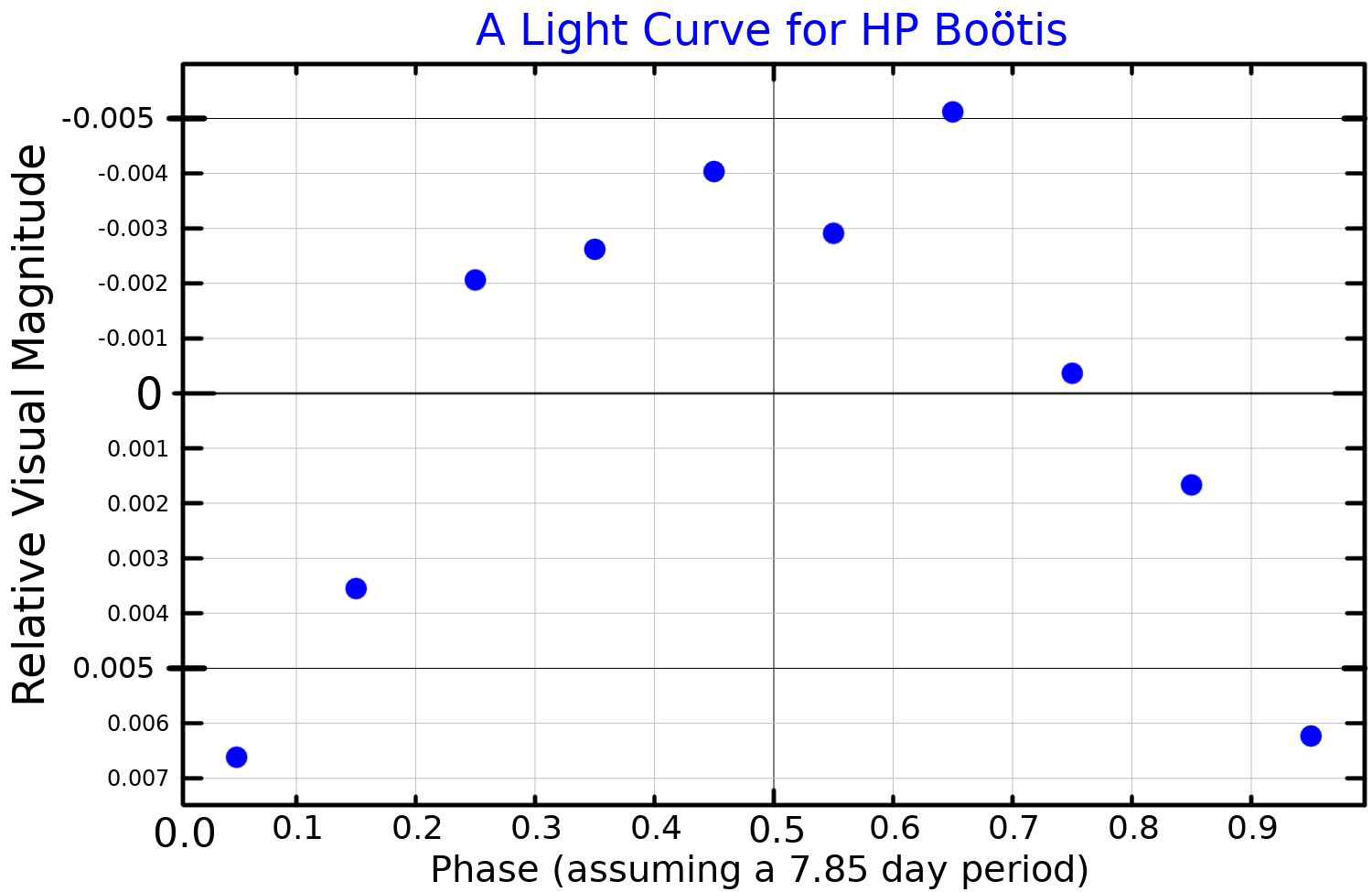
- The visual band light curve of HP Boötis, plotted from data published by Gaidos et al. (2000)

Observation data Epoch J2000 Equinox ICRS
- Constellation: Boötes
- Right ascension: 14^{h} 50^{m} 15.8110^{s}
- Declination: +23° 54′ 42.634″
- Apparent magnitude (V): 5.99

Characteristics
- Evolutionary stage: main sequence
- Spectral type: F9 IV-V
- U−B color index: +0.01
- B−V color index: +0.576
- Variable type: BY Dra

Astrometry
Radial velocity (R_{v})	−1.5 km/s
Proper motion (μ)	RA: +144.396 mas/yr Dec.: +31.661 mas/yr
Parallax (π)	54.9502±0.0343 mas
Distance	59.35 ± 0.04 ly (18.20 ± 0.01 pc)
Absolute magnitude (M_{V})	+4.56

Orbit (Note: Values not shown as range represent the peak value(s). The three best-fitting orbits are given in Table 5 of the paper.)
Primary	HD 130948 A
Name	HD 130948 BC
Period (P)	308.3 (155.2–35,116.2) yr
Semi-major axis (a)	47.2 (30.2–1,110) au
Eccentricity (e)	0.83 (0–0.96)
Inclination (i)	92.1 or 96.0, 91.0–105.1°
Longitude of the node (Ω)	0, 103.0, 173.3, 87.2–124.0, 47.9–129.4°
Periastron epoch (T)	2000 (41620 BC–87648)
Argument of periastron (ω) (secondary)	0, 61.5, 295.1, 360, 0–360°

Orbit
Primary	HD 130948 B
Name	HD 130948 C
Period (P)	10.010 ± 0.011 yr
Semi-major axis (a)	2.226+0.014 −0.013 au
Eccentricity (e)	0.1627±0.0017
Inclination (i)	95.7±0.2°
Longitude of the node (Ω)	313.39±0.12°
Periastron epoch (T)	54,613±22 MJD
Argument of periastron (ω) (secondary)	244±3°

Details

HD 130948 A
Mass	1.02±0.05 M_{☉}
Radius	1.113±0.022 R_{☉}
Luminosity	1.273±0.007 L_{☉}
Surface gravity (log g)	4.33±0.03 cgs
Temperature	5,812±57 K
Metallicity [Fe/H]	−0.01±0.02 dex
Rotation	8.1±0.4 days
Rotational velocity (v sin i)	6.8±0.9 km/s
Age	0.50±0.07 Gyr

HD 130948 B
Mass	59.8±0.6 M_{Jup}
Radius	1.00±0.01 R_{Jup}
Luminosity	(1.349±0.031)×10^{−4} L_{☉}
Surface gravity (log g)	5.18±0.01 cgs
Temperature	1,950±30 K
Age	0.50±0.07 Gyr

HD 130948 C
Mass	56.3±0.5 M_{Jup}
Radius	0.98±0.02 R_{Jup}
Luminosity	1.096+0.026 −0.024×10^{−4} L_{☉}
Surface gravity (log g)	5.16±0.01 cgs
Temperature	1,870±30 K
Age	0.50±0.07 Gyr

Other designations
- HP Boötis, GJ 564, BD+24°2786, HD 130948, FK5 3172, HIP 72567, HR 5534, SAO 83553

Database references
SIMBAD	data

HD 130948 or HP Boötis is a variable star with 2 brown dwarfs in the constellation Boötes. With an apparent magnitude of 6.0, it is faintly visible to the naked eye under very good observing conditions. It has a stellar classification of G1V, which means it is a main sequence star with a mass and surface temperature that are similar to the Sun.

The estimated age of HD 130948 is similar to the Sun at 4.7 billion years (Gyr) old, but it has a lower proportion of elements (63%) other than hydrogen or helium. However, a separate study in 2009 gave a much younger age of 0.5±0.3 Gyr and a higher metallicity that is very similar to the Sun. The younger age was favored in a 2019 study, based on coevality with the brown dwarf companions. Evolutionary models suggest that it is just reaching the end of its main sequence life.

Eric J. Gaidos et al. observed the star in 1998 and 1999, and discovered that it is a variable star. It was given its variable star designation, HP Boötis, in 2006.

In 2002, a pair of co-orbiting brown dwarfs were discovered in orbit around this star, named HD 130948 B and HD 130948 C. They were found using an adaptive optics instrument on the Gemini North 8m telescope in Hawaii. The brown dwarfs are similar to each other, with masses of 59.8±0.6 M_{J} and 56.3±0.5 M_{J}, radii of 1.00±0.01 R_{J} and 0.98±0.03 R_{J}, and temperatures of 1,950±30 K and 1,870±30 K for HD 130948 B and HD 130948 C, respectively. They orbit around each other with a period of 3,656 ± 4 days (10.010 ± 0.011 years), and the orbit around the primary star is poorly constrained due to insufficient orbital coverage, with an period in the order of centuries to dozens of thousand of years.

The space velocity components of this star through the Milky Way galaxy are (U, V, W) = (−14.0, 14.7, −0.1).
