= Gliese 268 =

Binary star system in the constellation Auriga

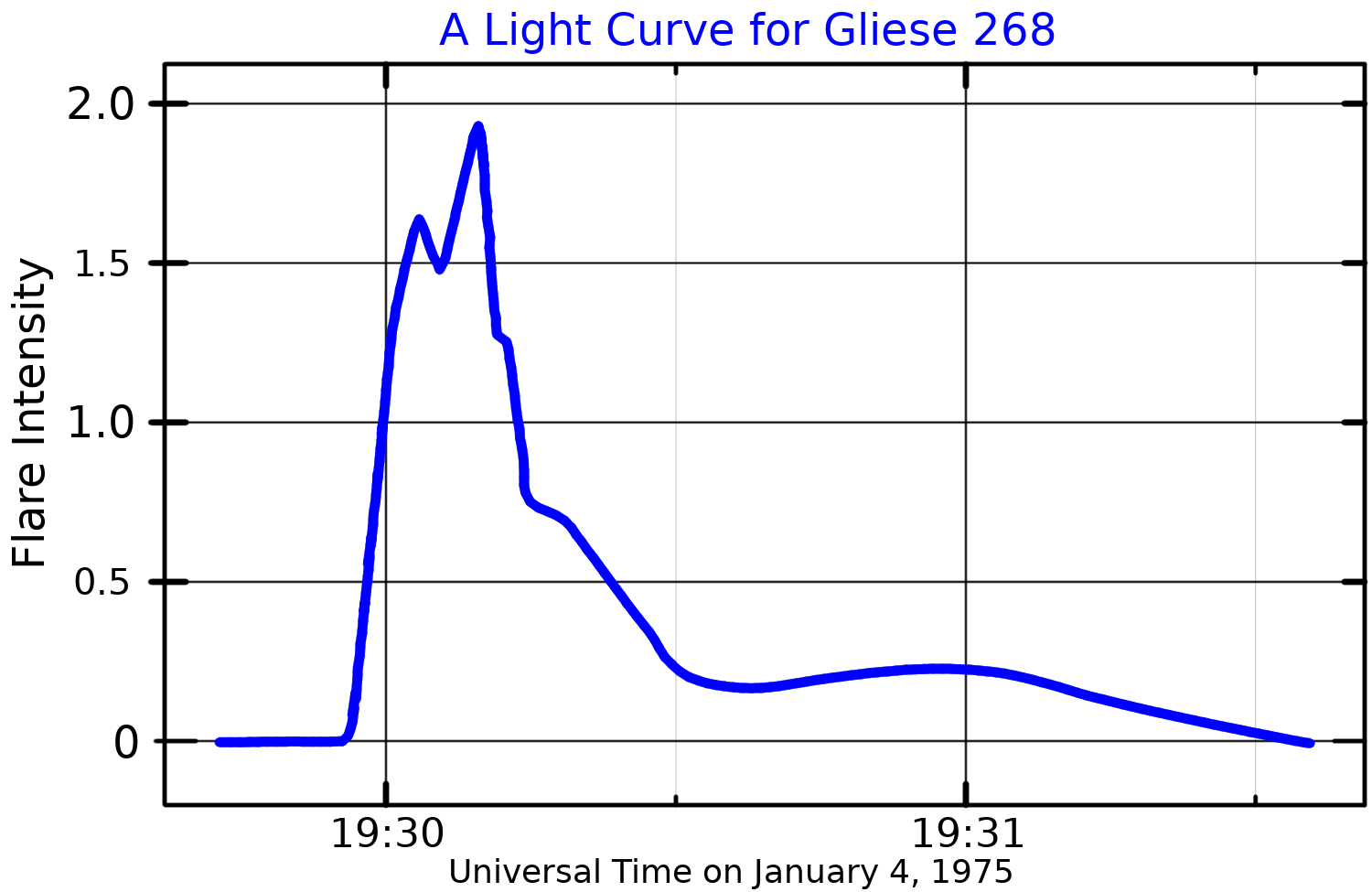
- A blue light light curve of a flare on Gliese 268. The intensity scale is relative to the star's quiescent brightness. Adapted from Pettersen (1975)

Observation data Epoch J2000 Equinox ICRS
- Constellation: Auriga
- Right ascension: 07^{h} 10^{m} 01.83358^{s}
- Declination: +38° 31′ 46.0865″
- Apparent magnitude (V): 11.52

Characteristics
- Spectral type: M4.5Ve
- U−B color index: +1.18
- B−V color index: +1.71
- Variable type: Flare star

Astrometry
Radial velocity (R_{v})	+41.792±0.025 km/s
Proper motion (μ)	RA: −439.420 mas/yr Dec.: −944.793 mas/yr
Parallax (π)	165.2147±0.0636 mas
Distance	19.741 ± 0.008 ly (6.053 ± 0.002 pc)
Absolute magnitude (M_{V})	+12.48

Orbit
Period (P)	10.42672±0.00006 d
Semi-major axis (a)	0.01110±0.0005" (.067185 AU (Note: Semi-major axis in AU = $\frac{semimajor\ axis\ in\ seconds}{parallax}\ {{=}}\ \frac{.01110}{.1652147}$ = .067185 AU; as the eccentricity is 0.32, the distance fluctuates between 68% and 132% of that, roughly from .046 AU to .089 AU.))
Eccentricity (e)	0.3203±0.0009
Inclination (i)	100.39±0.03°
Longitude of the node (Ω)	89.98±0.07°
Argument of periastron (ω) (secondary)	211.98±0.19°
Semi-amplitude (K_{1}) (primary)	34.814±0.036 km/s
Semi-amplitude (K_{2}) (secondary)	40.874±0.052 km/s

Details

Gliese 268 A
Mass	0.22599±0.00065 M_{☉}
Radius	0.242 R_{☉}
Luminosity	0.00572 L_{☉}
Temperature	3,192 K
Metallicity [Fe/H]	0.056 dex

Gliese 268 B
Mass	0.19248±0.00056 M_{☉}
Radius	0.218 R_{☉}
Luminosity	0.00427 L_{☉}
Temperature	3,192 K
Metallicity [Fe/H]	0.056 dex

Other designations
- QY Aur, GJ 268, HIP 34603, G 87-26, G 07-51, LFT 512, LHS 226, LTT 11987, Ross 986, TYC 2944-1956-1

Database references
SIMBAD	data
ARICNS	data
- Location of Gliese 268 in the constellation Auriga

Gliese 268 (QY Aurigae) is a binary star system in the constellation of Auriga, and is one of the one hundred closest star systems to the Earth, at a distance of 19.741 light-years (6.053 parsecs) away.

Gliese 268 is composed of two M-type dwarfs, or red dwarfs. The primary component of the system is calculated to have an apparent magnitude of 11.95, and the secondary component an apparent magnitude of 12.45.

In 1975, Bjørn Ragnvald Pettersen discovered that Gliese 268 is a flare star. It received its variable star designation, QY Aurigae, in 1977.
