= HD 33632 =

Star in Auriga

Observation data Epoch J2000 Equinox J2000 (ICRS)
- Constellation: Auriga
- Right ascension: 05^{h} 13^{m} 17.448^{s}
- Declination: +37° 20′ 14.32″
- Apparent magnitude (V): 6.47

Characteristics
- Evolutionary stage: main sequence + brown dwarf
- Spectral type: F8V

Astrometry
Proper motion (μ)	RA: −133.922 mas/yr Dec.: −136.772 mas/yr
Parallax (π)	37.8953±0.0263 mas
Distance	86.07 ± 0.06 ly (26.39 ± 0.02 pc)
Absolute magnitude (M_{V})	+4.40

Details

Aa
Mass	1.14 M_{☉}
Radius	1.11 R_{☉}
Luminosity	1.51 L_{☉}
Surface gravity (log g)	4.40 cgs
Temperature	6,074 K
Age	4.8 Gyr

Ab
Mass	46±8 M_{Jup}
Radius	0.97 R_{Jup}

Other designations
- BD+37°1091, HD 33632, HIP 24332, WDS J05133+3720A

Database references
SIMBAD	data

HD 33632 is an F-type main-sequence star with a brown dwarf companion located in the constellation of Auriga. The brown dwarf was directly imaged in mid 2024.

== Brown dwarf ==
HD 33632 Ab has a radius of 0.97 Jupiter radii and a mass of 46±8 Jupiter masses.
