= EX Hydrae =

Cataclysmic binary star system in the constellation Hydra

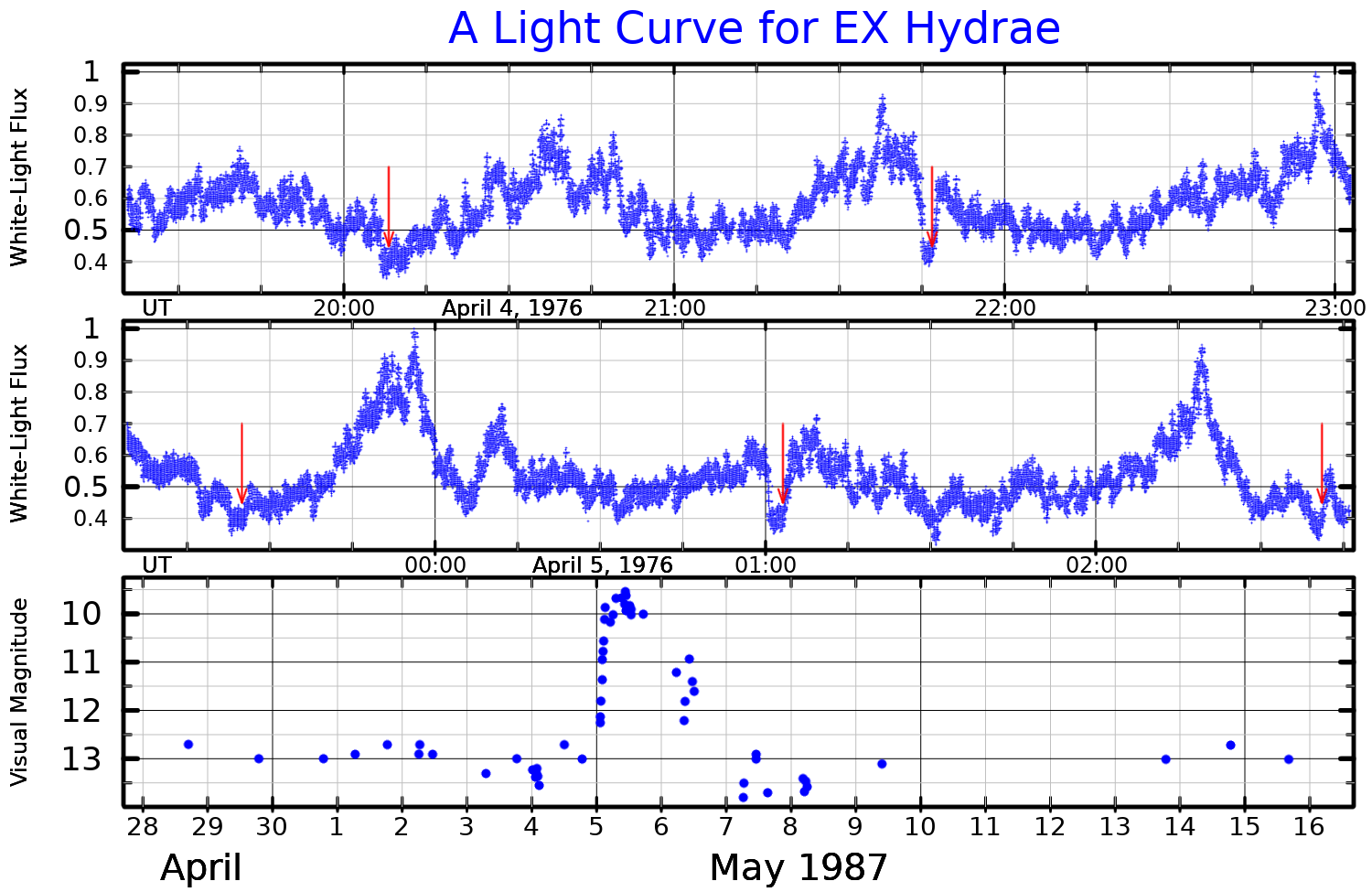
- A light curve for EX Hydrae. The top two panels show the variation when the star is in its quiescent state. Red arrows mark the times of maximum eclipse. The bottom panel shows the brightness change caused by a flare. Adapted from Warner and McGraw (1981) and Reinsch and Beuermann (1990).

Observation data Epoch J2000 Equinox ICRS
- Constellation: Hydra
- Right ascension: 12^{h} 52^{m} 24.22^{s}
- Declination: −29° 14′ 56.0″
- Apparent magnitude (V): 9.6 to 14.0

Characteristics
- Spectral type: white dwarf + M4/M5:
- Variable type: eclipsing intermediate polar

Astrometry
Radial velocity (R_{v})	−21 km/s
Proper motion (μ)	RA: −119.473 mas/yr Dec.: +30.330 mas/yr
Parallax (π)	17.5716±0.0166 mas
Distance	185.6 ± 0.2 ly (56.91 ± 0.05 pc)

Orbit
Period (P)	6,894.4 s
Semi-major axis (a)	0.68 R_{☉}
Inclination (i)	78.0±0.2°
Semi-amplitude (K_{1}) (primary)	58.9±1.8 km/s
Semi-amplitude (K_{2}) (secondary)	432.4±4.8 km/s

Details

White dwarf
Mass	0.788±0.025 M_{☉}
Radius	0.011 R_{☉}
Rotation	67 minutes

Red dwarf
Mass	0.1074±0.0047 M_{☉}
Radius	0.1513 R_{☉}

Other designations
- 1RXS J125224.7-291451, 2E 2876, RX J1252.4-2914, AAVSO 1247-28

Database references
SIMBAD	data

EX Hydrae is an eclipsing intermediate polar (DQ Herculis) -type cataclysmic variable star that also undergoes eclipses. The system varies in apparent magnitude from 9.6 to 14.0. The system consists of a white dwarf primary and an M-type secondary, of masses of 0.4–0.7 M_{☉} and 0.07–0.10 M_{☉} respectively. The orbital period is 98.25696 minutes (0.068233846 days). The system is 65±11 parsecs distant, making EX Hya one of the closest cataclysmic variable stars. The cataclysmic outbursts appear to be caused by accretion of material from the M-star to the white dwarf.

EX Hydrae also possess a 67-minute oscillation, believed to be caused by the spin period of the white dwarf component. EX Hydrae's outbursts are unpredictable.
