= HD 155876 =

Star in the constellation Hercules

- Location of HD 155876 in the constellation Hercules

Observation data Epoch J2000 Equinox ICRS
- Constellation: Hercules
- Right ascension: 17^{h} 12^{m} 07.9117^{s}
- Declination: +45° 39′ 57.216″
- Apparent magnitude (V): 9.52

Characteristics

A
- Evolutionary stage: main sequence
- Spectral type: M3

B
- Evolutionary stage: main sequence
- Spectral type: M4

Astrometry
Radial velocity (R_{v})	−30.9±0.5 km/s
Proper motion (μ)	RA: +348.59±5.68 mas/yr Dec.: −1624.84±6.80 mas/yr
Parallax (π)	156.66±1.37 mas
Distance	20.8 ± 0.2 ly (6.38 ± 0.06 pc)
Absolute magnitude (M_{V})	+10.31

Orbit
Period (P)	12.9512±0.0096 yr
Semi-major axis (a)	0.7620±0.0015" (4.864 AU (Note: Semi-major axis in AU = $\frac{semimajor\ axis\ in\ seconds}{parallax}\ {{=}}\ \frac{.7620}{.15666}$ = 4.864 AU; as the eccentricity is 0.74, the distance fluctuates between 26% and 174% of that, roughly from 1.26 AU to 8.46 AU.))
Eccentricity (e)	0.7430±0.008
Inclination (i)	149.14±0.25°
Longitude of the node (Ω)	160.0±1.3°
Periastron epoch (T)	1991.032±0.011 (Note: Fractional Besselian year)
Argument of periastron (ω) (secondary)	99.0±1.0°

Details

A
Mass	0.379±0.035 M_{☉}
Radius	0.37±0.07 R_{☉}
Luminosity	0.018 L_{☉}
Temperature	3,422±100 K
Metallicity [Fe/H]	−0.31±0.17 dex

B
Mass	0.369±0.035 M_{☉}
Radius	0.37±0.07 R_{☉}
Temperature	3,422±100 K
Metallicity [Fe/H]	−0.31±0.17 dex

Other designations
- BD+45°2505, GJ 661, HD 155876, HIP 84140, WDS J17121+4540, KUI 79, Furuhjelm 46
- A: LFT 1326, LHS 433, LTT 15095, NLTT 44362
- B: LFT 1327, LHS 434, LTT 15096, NLTT 44363

Database references
SIMBAD	The system
- A
- B

HD 155876, also known as Gliese 661, is a nearby binary star system, consisting of two very similar red dwarfs, located in the constellation Hercules.

The star's duplicity was discovered by the Dutch astronomer Gerard Kuiper in 1934 in a systematic survey for duplicity of the known stars within about 25 parsecs from the Sun, carried out with the 36-inch telescope of the Lick Observatory. HD 155876 is the nearest "true" (i. e. not brown dwarf) star system in Hercules; however, there is a brown dwarf in this constellation located closer, WISE 1741+2553.
