= Feige 55 =

White dwarf in the constellation Ursa Major

Observation data Epoch J2000 Equinox ICRS
- Constellation: Ursa Major
- Right ascension: 12^{h} 04^{m} 38.5357^{s}
- Declination: +60° 32′ 08.086″
- Apparent magnitude (V): +13.45

Characteristics
- Spectral type: DAO+M5.5V

Astrometry
Proper motion (μ)	RA: −54.744±0.065 mas/yr Dec.: −34.855±0.061 mas/yr
Parallax (π)	5.0141±0.0419 mas
Distance	650 ± 5 ly (199 ± 2 pc)

Other designations
- WD 1202+608, 2MASS J12043856+6032082, Gaia DR2 1582231699483080192

Database references
SIMBAD	data

Feige 55 is a hot white dwarf approximately 650 light-years away from the Sun in the constellation of Ursa Major. The star is likely a post-AGB star with relatively high luminosity for a standard white dwarf. It is also in a close binary system with orbital period of 1.4933 days.
