= H Orionis =

Binary star in the constellation Orion

h Orionis
- Location of h Orionis (circled in red)

Observation data Epoch J2000 Equinox J2000
- Constellation: Orion
- Right ascension: 05^{h} 09^{m} 19.6433^{s}
- Declination: +09° 49′ 46.503″
- Apparent magnitude (V): +5.43

Characteristics
- Evolutionary stage: main sequence
- Spectral type: kA2hF1mF3
- B−V color index: 0.249±0.010

Astrometry
| Radial velocity (R_{v}) | +43.9119±0.0036 km/s |
| Proper motion (μ) | RA: +60.769 mas/yr Dec.: −7.443 mas/yr |
| Parallax (π) | 18.7710±0.1981 mas |
| Distance | 174 ± 2 ly (53.3 ± 0.6 pc) |
| Absolute magnitude (M_{V}) | +1.74 |

Orbit
| Period (P) | 155.87±0.03 days |
| Semi-major axis (a) | 0.75 au |
| Eccentricity (e) | 0.553±0.015 |
| Inclination (i) | 29±2 or 151±2° |
| Periastron epoch (T) | 2,400,012.3±0.8 BJD |
| Argument of periastron (ω) (secondary) | 275.2±1.5° |
| Semi-amplitude (K_{1}) (primary) | 6.89±0.13 km/s |

Details

Aa
| Mass | 1.76 M_{☉} |
| Radius | 2.2 R_{☉} |
| Luminosity | 15.0 L_{☉} |
| Surface gravity (log g) | 4.07 cgs |
| Temperature | 7,500 K |
| Metallicity [Fe/H] | +0.28 dex |
| Rotational velocity (v sin i) | 12.6 km/s |
| Age | 1.12±0.05 Gyr |

Ab
| Mass | 0.53 M_{☉} |
| Radius | 0.50 R_{☉} |
| Temperature | 3,900 K |
| Age | 1.12±0.05 Gyr |

Other designations
- 16 Ori, BD+09°743, HD 33254, HIP 23983, HR 1672, TYC 702-2789-1

Database references
| SIMBAD | data |

h Orionis is a binary star in the constellation Orion. At an apparent magnitude of +5.43, it is faintly visible to the naked eye in locations far from light pollution. Parallax measurements give a distance of 174 light-years (53.3 parsecs).

== Characteristics ==
This is a single-lined spectroscopic binary, first spotted in 1969 by Peter S. Conti. The components take 155.87 days to orbit around each other, following a moderately-eccentric path with an eccentricity of 0.553 and a semi-major axis of 0.75 astronomical units.

The primary is an A or F-type star and an Am star, with its spectrum matching a spectral class of kA2hF1mF3. The star has 1.76 times the mass of the Sun and 2.2 times the Sun's radius. It has an effective temperature of 7,500 K, which gives it the white hue typical of an A or early F-type star.

The secondary is a red dwarf with about half the size of the Sun and an effecitve temperature of 3,900 K.

h Orionis has been suspected to be a member of the Hyades cluster based on its stellar kinematics. However, the estimated age of the system, 1.12 billion years, is almost twice that of the cluster. The red dwarf also does not emit the amount of X-rays expected for an object of the Hyades' age, further arguing against the system's membership of the cluster.
