= GRW +70 8247 =

Star in the constellation Draco

Observation data Epoch J2000.0 Equinox J2000.0 (ICRS)
- Constellation: Draco
- Right ascension: 19^{h} 00^{m} 10.2534^{s}
- Declination: +70° 39′ 51.418″
- Apparent magnitude (V): 13.19

Characteristics
- Spectral type: DAP4.5
- U−B color index: -0.85
- B−V color index: +0.05

Astrometry
Proper motion (μ)	RA: +85.774 mas/yr Dec.: +505.050 mas/yr
Parallax (π)	77.6525±0.0317 mas
Distance	42.00 ± 0.02 ly (12.878 ± 0.005 pc)

Details
Mass	1.029 M_{☉}
Radius	5,960 (Note: Applying the Stefan–Boltzmann law with a nominal solar effective temperature of 5,772 K: $$\sqrt{\biggl(\frac{5,772}{11,880}\biggr)^4 \cdot 10^{-2.88}} = 0.00857\ R_\odot$$.) km
Luminosity	0.013182 L_{☉}
Surface gravity (log g)	8.67 cgs
Temperature	12540±143 K
Age	(as white dwarf) 1.138 Gyr

Other designations
- GJ 742, AC +70 8247, G 260-15, LFT 1446, LHS 3424, LTT 15585, Grw+70 8247, WD 1900+705

Database references
SIMBAD	data
ARICNS	data

GRW +70 8247 is a white dwarf star located 42 light-years from Earth in the constellation Draco. With a magnitude of about 13 it is visible only through a large telescope.

== Properties ==
Although photographed in the 19th century as part of the Carte du Ciel project, the star was not determined to be a white dwarf until G. P. Kuiper observed it in 1934. This makes it the fifth or sixth white dwarf discovered. (Note: The star EGGR 37 was suspected to be a white dwarf by April 1934, but this was not confirmed until 1938.) At first, its spectrum was thought to be almost featureless, but later observation showed it to have unusual broad, shallow absorption bands. In 1970, when light that it emitted was observed to be circularly polarized, it became the first white dwarf known to have a magnetic field. In the 1980s, it was realized that the unusual absorption bands could be explained as hydrogen absorption lines shifted by the Zeeman effect.
