= WD 0032−317 =

White dwarf system with a hot brown dwarf

Observation data Epoch Equinox
- Constellation: Sculptor
- Right ascension: 00^{h} 34^{m} 49.8573^{s}
- Declination: −31° 29′ 52.686″
- Apparent magnitude (V): 16.17

Characteristics
- Evolutionary stage: White dwarf

Astrometry
Parallax (π)	2.320±0.053 mas
Distance	431.1±9.8 pc

Orbit
Primary	WD 0032−317
Period (P)	8340.9090±0.0013 s
Semi-amplitude (K_{1}) (primary)	53.4±1.7 km/s

Details

WD 0032−317
Mass	0.4187±0.0047 (He-core); 0.386±0.014 (Hybrid-core) M_{☉}
Radius	0.0266±0.0012 R_{☉}
Temperature	36965±100 K

WD 0032−317 b
Mass	0.0812±0.0029 (He-core); 0.0750±0.0037 (Hybrid-core) M_{☉}
Radius	0.0789+0.0085 −0.0083 (He-core); 0.0747+0.0085 −0.0079 (Hybrid-core) R_{☉}
Temperature	5126±28 (He-core); 5111±41 (Hybrid-core) (equilibrium temperature) K

Other designations
- WD 0032−317, MCT 0032-3146, EC 00323-3146, GALEX J003449.8-312952, 2MASS J00344984-3129524, TIC 251857373, USNO-B1.0 0585-00006922, Gaia DR3 2317319612801004416, Gaia DR2 2317319612801004416

Database references
SIMBAD	data

WD 0032−317 is a low mass white dwarf star orbited by brown dwarf WD 0032−317 b.

== WD 0032−317 ==
The white dwarf WD 0032−317 is located about 1,400 light years from Earth. WD 0032−317 formed about three billion years ago when a low mass star (possibly of 1.3 solar masses) expanded into its red giant phase. The star then blew out its outer layers leaving behind the helium-rich core (which is WD 0032−317).

== WD 0032−317 b ==
The orbiting brown dwarf, WD 0032−317 b, was massive enough to survive the red giant's nova event. It is an extremely hot and very large (75-88 Jupiter masses) brown dwarf that orbits WD 0032−317. One orbit from WD 0032−317 b takes only 2.5 hours. This object is tidally locked to its star with a day side temperature of 8,000 K (7,730 °C; 13,940 °F) and a night temperature of about 2,000 K (1,730 °C; 3,140 °F) making its temperature equivalent to a planet orbiting close to a late stage B-type star. The intense ultraviolet (UV) exposure can break down the molecules in WD 0032−317's atmosphere and vaporize materials from the surface of the brown dwarf.
