= LHS 2090 =

Red dwarf

- Location of LHS 2090 in the constellation Cancer

Observation data Epoch J2000.0 Equinox ICRS
- Constellation: Cancer
- Right ascension: 09^{h} 00^{m} 23.546^{s}
- Declination: +21° 50′ 04.90″
- Apparent magnitude (V): 16.11

Characteristics
- Evolutionary stage: Main sequence
- Spectral type: M6.5 V
- Apparent magnitude (J): 9.44

Astrometry
Radial velocity (R_{v})	+23.3 km/s
Proper motion (μ)	RA: −514.942 mas/yr Dec.: −592.253 mas/yr
Parallax (π)	157.2686±0.0535 mas
Distance	20.739 ± 0.007 ly (6.359 ± 0.002 pc)

Details
Mass	0.09 M_{☉}
Radius	0.12 R_{☉}
Luminosity	0.00082 L_{☉}
Temperature	2680±24 K
Metallicity [Fe/H]	−0.06±0.17 dex
Rotation	0.439 d
Rotational velocity (v sin i)	15.0±1.0 km/s

Other designations
- LHS 2090, LP 368-128, NLTT 20726, 2MASS J09002359+2150054

Database references
SIMBAD	data

LHS 2090 is a red dwarf star of spectral type M6.5V, located in constellation Cancer at 20.74 light-years (6.359 parsecs) from Earth.

The star was identified to be a nearby red dwarf at distance of 6.359 parsecs (20.74 ly) away from the sun in 2001, and its parallax was first measured in 2006. As typical for very cool red dwarfs, its spectrum is dominated by molecular water absorption. The stellar metallicity is similar to that of the Sun.

Radial velocity measurements did not yield any detection of a stellar companion or giant planet in orbit around LHS 2090, as of 2018.
