= GJ 1245 =

Triple star system in the constellation Cygnus

V1581 Cygni
- Location of GJ 1245 in the constellation Cygnus

Observation data Epoch J2000 Equinox ICRS
- Constellation: Cygnus
- GJ 1245 AC
- Right ascension: 19^{h} 53^{m} 55.142^{s}
- Declination: +44° 24′ 44.39″
- Apparent magnitude (V): 13.46 / 16.75
- GJ 1245 B
- Right ascension: 19^{h} 53^{m} 55.141^{s}
- Declination: +44° 24′ 54.15″
- Apparent magnitude (V): 14.01

Characteristics
- Spectral type: M6V / M8V / M6V
- Variable type: UV Cet

Astrometry
Radial velocity (R_{v})	3.93±0.38 km/s
Proper motion (μ)	RA: 349.363(56) mas/yr Dec.: −480.322(54) mas/yr
Parallax (π)	214.5745±0.0476 mas
Distance	15.200 ± 0.003 ly (4.660 ± 0.001 pc)
Absolute magnitude (M_{V})	15.12 / 18.41 / 15.72

Orbit
Primary	GJ 1245 AC
Name	GJ 1245 B
Period (P)	342+61 −41 yr
Semi-major axis (a)	7.89+3.28 −0.15″
Eccentricity (e)	0
Inclination (i)	121.2+5.5 −14.1°
Longitude of the node (Ω)	98.9+9.4 −7.0°
Periastron epoch (T)	1971+13 −17
Argument of periastron (ω) (secondary)	0°

Orbit
Primary	GJ 1245 A
Name	GJ 1245 C
Period (P)	6,147±17 days
Semi-major axis (a)	0.8267±0.0008" (36.77 AU (Note: Semi-major axis in AU = (semimajor axis in seconds)/ parallax = .8267″/0.2145745 = 36.77 AU; as the eccentricity is 0.33, the distance fluctuates between 67% and 133% of that, roughly from 24 AU to 49 AU.))
Eccentricity (e)	0.334±0.002
Inclination (i)	135.7±0.1°
Longitude of the node (Ω)	261.2±0.2°
Periastron epoch (T)	51506.8±2.1
Argument of periastron (ω) (secondary)	36.1±0.2°

Details

GJ 1245 A
Mass	0.120±0.001 M_{☉}
Radius	0.146±0.007 R_{☉}
Luminosity	0.0014 L_{☉}
Temperature	2,927 K
Metallicity [Fe/H]	−0.07 dex
Age	~300 Myr

GJ 1245 C
Mass	0.081±0.001 M_{☉}
Radius	0.087±0.004 R_{☉}
Luminosity	0.0003 L_{☉}
Temperature	2,611 K
Metallicity [Fe/H]	−0.08 dex

GJ 1245 B
Mass	0.110±0.004 M_{☉}
Radius	0.136±0.004 R_{☉}
Luminosity	0.00123 L_{☉}
Surface gravity (log g)	5.20 cgs
Temperature	2,919±34 K
Metallicity [Fe/H]	−0.05 dex
Rotation	0.71 days
Rotational velocity (v sin i)	7 km/s
Age	3.1 Gyr

Other designations
- V1581 Cyg, GJ 1245, WDS J19539+4425
- GJ 1245 AC: G 208-44, LHS 3494, NLTT 48414, KIC 8451868, 2MASS J19535443+4424541
- GJ 1245 B: G 208-45, LHS 3495, NLTT 48415, KIC 8451881, 2MASS J19535508+4424550

Database references
- AC
- B

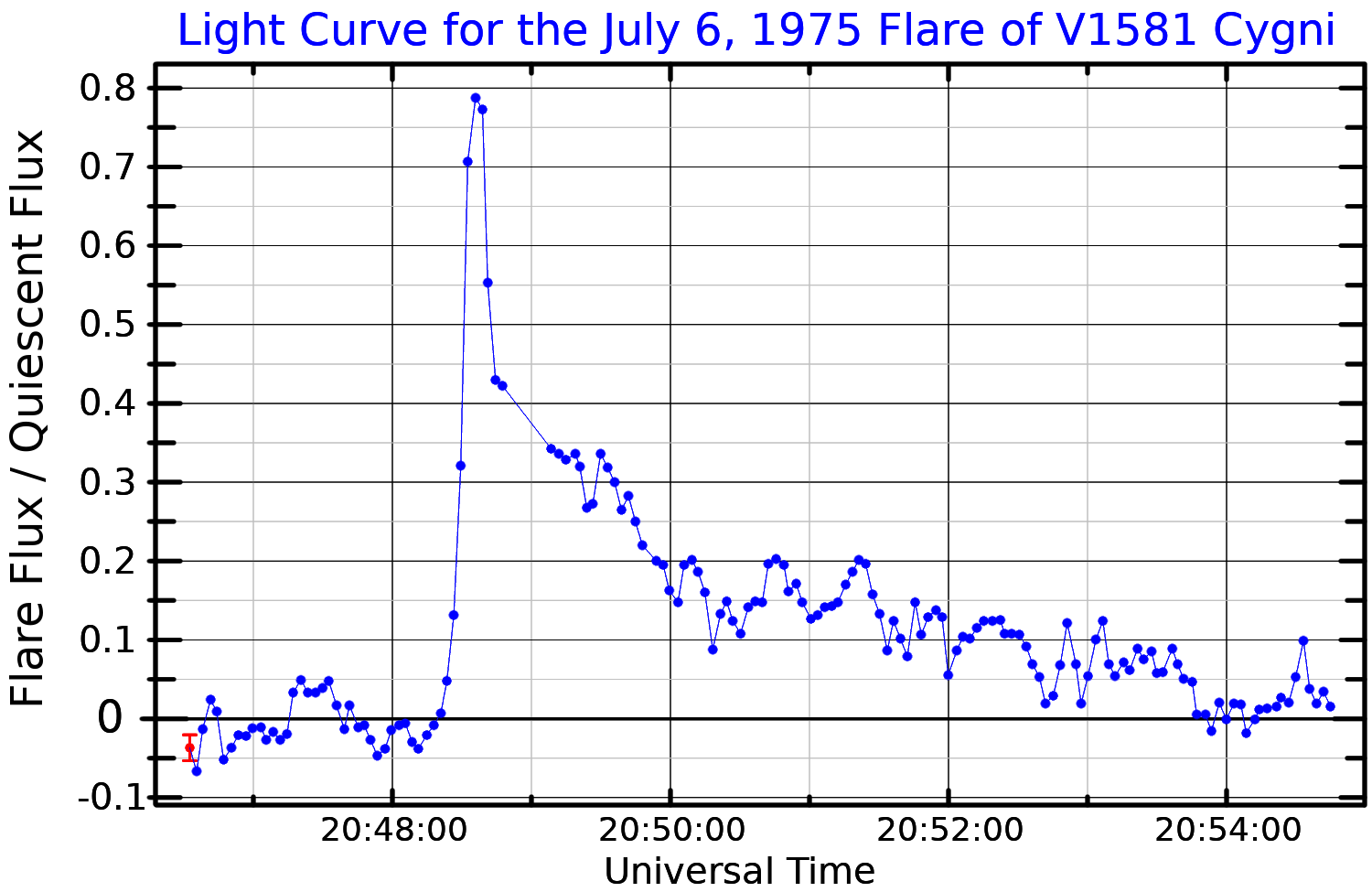
Blue band light curve for a flare of V1581 Cygni. The left-most point shows a 1 sigma error bar. Adapted from Cristaldi and Rodonò (1976)

GJ 1245 (Gliese 1245) is a double star with components G 208-44 and G 208-45, located 15.2 light-years (4.7 parsecs) away in the constellation Cygnus. G 208-44 is itself a closer double star made up of two red dwarfs, while G 208-45 is also a red dwarf. GJ 1245 is the 43rd closest stellar system to the Solar System. GJ 1245 A and B are both active flare stars, and the pair are collectively designated V1581 Cygni.

The largest of the three stars, GJ 1245 A (G 208-44 A) is only 12% the Sun's mass. Of the other two stars, GJ 1245 C (G 208-44 B), is closest to star A at 2 AU away; it is 8% of the Sun's mass. The third star, GJ 1245 B (G 208-45), is 27 AU away from star A, and is estimated to complete an orbit every 279 years. It is slightly smaller and less luminous than GJ 1245 A.

== See also ==
- List of nearest stars
