= Gliese 623 =

Star system in the constellation Hercules

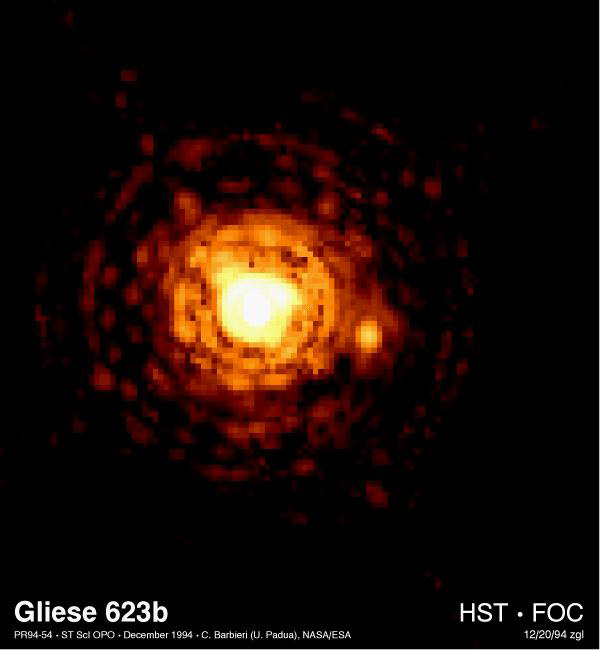
- Gliese 623, imaged by the Hubble Space Telescope. The fainter companion is to the right.

Observation data Epoch J2000 Equinox ICRS
- Constellation: Hercules
- Right ascension: 16^{h} 24^{m} 09.314^{s}
- Declination: +48° 21′ 11.11″

Characteristics
- Spectral type: M3.0V

Astrometry
Radial velocity (R_{v})	−28.06±0.59 km/s
Proper motion (μ)	RA: 1,145.2 mas/yr Dec.: −450.7 mas/yr
Parallax (π)	125.0±0.3 mas
Distance	26.09 ± 0.06 ly (8.00 ± 0.02 pc)

Orbit
Period (P)	1,367.4±0.6 d
Semi-major axis (a)	1.894±0.019 AU
Eccentricity (e)	0.629±0.004
Inclination (i)	152.5±0.2°
Longitude of the node (Ω)	98.3±0.5°
Periastron epoch (T)	45838.7±2.8
Argument of periastron (ω) (secondary)	245.4±0.5°
Argument of periastron (ω) (primary)	65.4±0.5°

Details

A
Mass	0.379±0.007 M_{☉}
Radius	0.404 ± 0.024 (Note: Calculated, using the Stefan-Boltzmann law and the star's effective temperature and luminosity, with respect to the solar nominal effective temperature of 5,772 K: $$\sqrt{\biggl(\frac{5,772}{3,400}\biggr)^4 \cdot 10^{-1.707}} = 0.404\ R_\odot.$$) R_{☉}
Luminosity	0.0196+0.0024 −0.0021 L_{☉}
Temperature	3,400±25 K

B
Mass	0.114±0.002 M_{☉}
Radius	0.133 ± 0.008 (Note: Calculated, using the Stefan-Boltzmann law and the star's effective temperature and luminosity, with respect to the solar nominal effective temperature of 5,772 K: $$\sqrt{\biggl(\frac{5,772}{2,840}\biggr)^4 \cdot 10^{-2.986}} = 0.133\ R_\odot.$$) R_{☉}
Luminosity	0.00103+0.00013 −0.00011 L_{☉}
Temperature	2,840±27 K

Other designations
- GJ 623, HIP 80346, G 202-45, LHS 417

Database references
SIMBAD	data
- Location of Gliese 623 in the constellation Hercules

Gliese 623 is a dim binary star 26.09 light-years (7.99 parsecs) from Earth in the constellation Hercules. It was photographed by the NASA/ESA Hubble Space Telescope's Faint Object Camera in 1994. The binary system consists of two red dwarfs orbiting each other at a distance of 1.9 astronomical units.

== See also ==
- List of star systems within 25–30 light-years
