= Gliese 22 =

Star in the constellation Cassiopeia

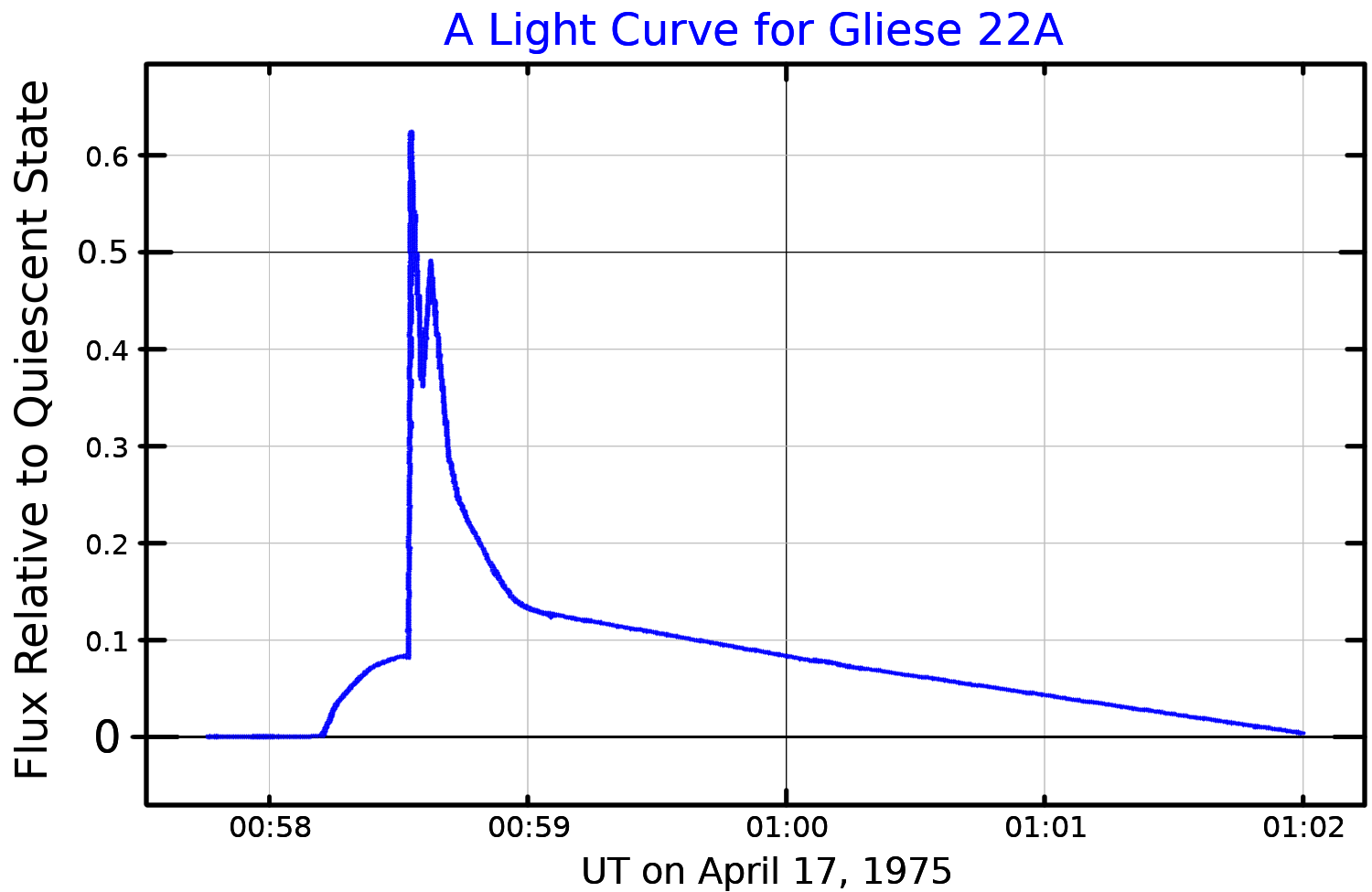
- A blue band light curve for a flare of Gliese 22A, adapted from Pettersen (1975)

Observation data Epoch J2000.0 Equinox ICRS
- Constellation: Cassiopeia
- Gliese 22 A
- Right ascension: 00^{h} 32^{m} 29.4336^{s}
- Declination: +67° 14′ 08.409″
- Apparent magnitude (V): 10.29
- Gliese 22 B
- Right ascension: 00^{h} 32^{m} 29.58665^{s}
- Declination: +67° 14′ 03.7983″
- Apparent magnitude (V): 12.19
- Gliese 22 C
- Right ascension: 00^{h} 32^{m} 29.4^{s}
- Declination: +67° 14′ 08″
- Apparent magnitude (V): 13.2

Characteristics
- Spectral type: M2.5Ve / M3V
- U−B color index: 1.16
- B−V color index: 1.54
- R−I color index: 0.99
- Variable type: Flare stars

Astrometry

A
Radial velocity (R_{v})	10 km/s
Proper motion (μ)	RA: 1739.0 mas/yr Dec.: −224.93 mas/yr
Parallax (π)	99.35±2.17 mas
Distance	32.8 ± 0.7 ly (10.1 ± 0.2 pc)
Absolute magnitude (M_{V})	10.26

B
Radial velocity (R_{v})	−0.54±0.68 km/s
Proper motion (μ)	RA: 1703.226±0.035 mas/yr Dec.: −250.056±0.043 mas/yr
Parallax (π)	100.3966±0.0374 mas
Distance	32.49 ± 0.01 ly (9.960 ± 0.004 pc)

Orbit
Primary	Gliese 22 AC
Name	Gliese 22 B
Period (P)	223.3 yr
Semi-major axis (a)	3.322″
Eccentricity (e)	0.293
Inclination (i)	47.3°
Longitude of the node (Ω)	174.9°
Periastron epoch (T)	JD 1859.4
Argument of periastron (ω) (secondary)	146.3°

Orbit
Primary	Gliese 22 A (Aa)
Name	Gliese 22 C (Ab)
Period (P)	5,694.2±14.9 days
Semi-major axis (a)	0.5106±0.0007″
Eccentricity (e)	0.163±0.002
Inclination (i)	43.7±0.2°
Longitude of the node (Ω)	178.3±0.2°
Periastron epoch (T)	JD 51817.2
Argument of periastron (ω) (secondary)	284.5±0.5°

Details
Mass	0.378(A) + 0.136(C) M_{☉}
Radius	0.5(A) R_{☉}
Luminosity	0.04 L_{☉}
Temperature	2000–3500 K

Details

B
Mass	0.382 M_{☉}
Radius	0.394 R_{☉}
Luminosity	0.011 L_{☉}
Temperature	3,339 K
Metallicity [Fe/H]	−0.24 dex
Rotational velocity (v sin i)	<4 km/s

Other designations
- 2MASS J00322970+6714080, BD+66°34, CCDM J00325+6714, GJ 22, HIP 2552, LFT 47, V547 Cassiopeiae, ADS 440

Database references
SIMBAD	A
- B
Exoplanet Archive	data

Gliese 22, also catalogued V547 Cassiopeiae or ADS 440, is a hierarchical star system approximately 33 light-years (10.1 parsecs) away in the constellation of Cassiopeia. The system consists of pair of red dwarf stars, Gliese 22A and Gliese 22C, orbited by a third red dwarf Gliese 22B in an outer orbit of about 223 years.

The discovery of flare activity on Gliese 22A was announced by Bjørn Ragnvald Pettersen in 1975, which led to it being given a variable star designation, V547 Cassiopeiae, in 1977.

== Planetary system ==
As of 2008, it was announced that a possible extrasolar planet, Gliese 22B b, orbits Gliese 22B but this is currently unconfirmed. The study in 2011 has indicated the orbit of the purported planet is stable.

The Gliese 22 B planetary system
Companion (in order from star)	Mass	Semimajor axis (AU)	Orbital period (days)	Eccentricity	Inclination (°)	Radius
b (unconfirmed)	16 M_{J}	—	5,500	0	—	—
