= LHS 6343 =

Binary star system in the northern constellation of Lyra

Observation data Epoch J2000 Equinox ICRS
- Constellation: Lyra
- Right ascension: 19^{h} 10^{m} 14.354^{s}
- Declination: +46° 57′ 26.14″
- Apparent magnitude (V): 13.435 (13.88 / 14.63)

Characteristics

LHS 6343 A
- Spectral type: M4V / T1.5
- B−V color index: 1.57 ± 0.07

LHS 6343 B
- Spectral type: M5V
- B−V color index: 1.60 ± 0.07

Astrometry
Proper motion (μ)	RA: -76.59 mas/yr Dec.: -176.78 mas/yr
Distance	119.4 ± 3.6 ly (36.6 ± 1.1 pc)

Orbit
Period (P)	12.7137941 ± 0.0000002 d
Semi-major axis (a)	0.0797 ± 0.0008 AU
Eccentricity (e)	0.030 ± 0.002
Inclination (i)	90.45 ± 0.03°
Periastron epoch (T)	JD 2455008.07259 ± 0.00001
Argument of periastron (ω) (secondary)	320 ± 4°
Semi-amplitude (K_{1}) (primary)	9.69 ± 0.02 km/s

Details

LHS 6343 A
Mass	0.363±0.020 M_{☉}
Radius	0.375±0.019 R_{☉}
Surface gravity (log g)	4.851 ± 0.008 cgs
Temperature	3431±21 K
Metallicity [Fe/H]	0.04 ± 0.08 dex
Rotation	13.137 ± 0.011

LHS 6343 B
Mass	0.297±0.019 M_{☉}
Radius	0.318±0.018 R_{☉}
Temperature	3354±17 K
Metallicity [Fe/H]	0.04 ± 0.08 dex

LHS 6343 C
Mass	62.6±2.2 M_{Jup}
Radius	0.788±0.043 R_{Jup}
Luminosity	1.70+0.12 −0.11×10^{−5} L_{☉}
Surface gravity (log g)	5.40±0.04 cgs
Temperature	1303±29 K
Age	2.86+0.40 −0.33 or 3.11+0.50 −0.38 Gyr

Other designations
- KOI-959, KIC 10002261, G 205-57, 2MASS J19101435+4657261

Database references
SIMBAD	LHS 6343
- LHS 6343 A
- LHS 6343 B
- LHS 6343 C

LHS 6343 is a star system in the northern constellation of Lyra. It appears exceedingly faint with a combined apparent magnitude of 13.435. Based on its stellar properties, the system is thought to be about 119.4 light-years (36.6 parsecs) away.

LHS 6343 is a binary star with two red dwarfs, designated LHS 6343 A and B, respectively. A brown dwarf orbits LHS 6343 A at a close distance, and periodically transits it. The brown dwarf, designated LHS 6343 C, is located within the brown dwarf desert, a zone around stars where very few brown dwarfs have been discovered.

The system was in the field of view of the Kepler spacecraft, and was monitored continuously for possible planets transiting the star, although the transits were found to be caused by LHS 6343 C.

== Properties ==
LHS 6343 is a visual binary. Both stars are red dwarf stars that are much less massive compared to the Sun—the primary is 36% the mass of the Sun and the secondary, 29.2% the mass of the Sun. The two stars have been individually resolved using adaptive optics, showing an angular separation of 0.55″, corresponding to a distance of about 20 astronomical units (AU).

The brown dwarf LHS 6343 C orbits the primary star LHS 6343 A at a distance of only 0.0797 AU every 12.7 days. It is about 5 billion years old, and models suggest the brown dwarf has a surface temperature of 1130 K. The system hierarchy is similar to NLTT 41135, another red dwarf binary with a brown dwarf orbiting one of the stars.

== Possible planet ==
LHS 6343 may have a massive planet within the system. In 2012, transit-timing variation was analyzed for any possible substellar companions that may be perturbing the brown dwarf from its normal orbit. Such an object would be less massive than Jupiter and its orbital period would be 3.5 to 8 times larger than that of the brown dwarf. However, the hypothetical perturber's existence has not been confirmed and warrants more observations of the system.

The LHS 6343 planetary system
Companion (in order from star)	Mass	Semimajor axis (AU)	Orbital period (days)	Eccentricity	Inclination (°)	Radius
b (unconfirmed)	0.1–1 M_{J}	—	44.45–101.6	—	—	—
