= EI Cancri =

Star in the constellation Cancer

- Location of EI Cancri in the constellation Cancer

Observation data Epoch J2000 Equinox ICRS
- Constellation: Cancer
- A
- Right ascension: 08^{h} 58^{m} 15.07493^{s}
- Declination: +19° 45′ 48.2581″
- Apparent magnitude (V): 13.93
- B
- Right ascension: 08^{h} 58^{m} 15.14813^{s}
- Declination: +19° 45′ 48.8367″
- Apparent magnitude (V): 13.75

Characteristics

A
- Spectral type: M8Ve

B
- Spectral type: M7V

Astrometry

A
Radial velocity (R_{v})	13 ± 5 km/s
Proper motion (μ)	RA: −767.060 mas/yr Dec.: −100.176 mas/yr
Parallax (π)	194.1443±0.1228 mas
Distance	16.80 ± 0.01 ly (5.151 ± 0.003 pc)

B
Proper motion (μ)	RA: −937.133 mas/yr Dec.: −34.559 mas/yr
Parallax (π)	196.2619±0.1976 mas
Distance	16.62 ± 0.02 ly (5.095 ± 0.005 pc)

Details

A
Mass	0.120±0.014 M_{☉}
Radius	0.136±0.020 R_{☉}
Luminosity (bolometric)	0.00135±0.00040 L_{☉}
Temperature	2,890±79 K
Metallicity [Fe/H]	+0.08 dex
Rotation	≤10.76 days
Rotational velocity (v sin i)	16.70±0.64 km/s

B
Mass	0.103±0.014 M_{☉}
Radius	0.119±0.021 R_{☉}
Luminosity (bolometric)	0.000937±0.000028 L_{☉}
Temperature	2,802±78 K
Metallicity [Fe/H]	+0.14 dex
Rotation	≤9.60 days
Rotational velocity (v sin i)	16.70±0.64 km/s

Other designations
- EI Cnc, GJ 1116, WDS J08582+1945AB, G 9-38, G 47-14, G 41-11, LP 426-40, LTT 12343, PLX 2144.03, GSC 01397-01138, 2MASS J08581519+1945470
- A: LHS 2076, NLTT 20638, Gaia DR2 660597997696173440
- B: LHS 2077, NLTT 20637, Gaia DR2 660597997697274752

Database references
SIMBAD	The system
- A
- B

EI Cancri, also known as G 9-38 and GJ 1116, is a binary star system consisting of two M-type stars. Located at a distance of 16.7 light-years (5.12 parsecs), it is among the nearest star systems.

This system consist of two very-low-mass stars that are orbiting each other at an assumed orbital separation of 7.0 astronomical units and an estimated period of 42 years. Component A has an apparent magnitude 13.93, 0.127 times the Sun's mass, 0.136 times the Sun's radius, and 0.14% of the Sun's luminosity. Component B has an apparent magnitude 13.75, 0.111 times the Sun's mass, 0.119 times the Sun's radius, and 0.09% of the Sun's luminosity. At the very end of the main sequence, with spectral classifications of M8Ve and M7V respectively, their effective temperatures are below 3,000 K. A 2015 search for a third star in the system has yielded inconclusive results.

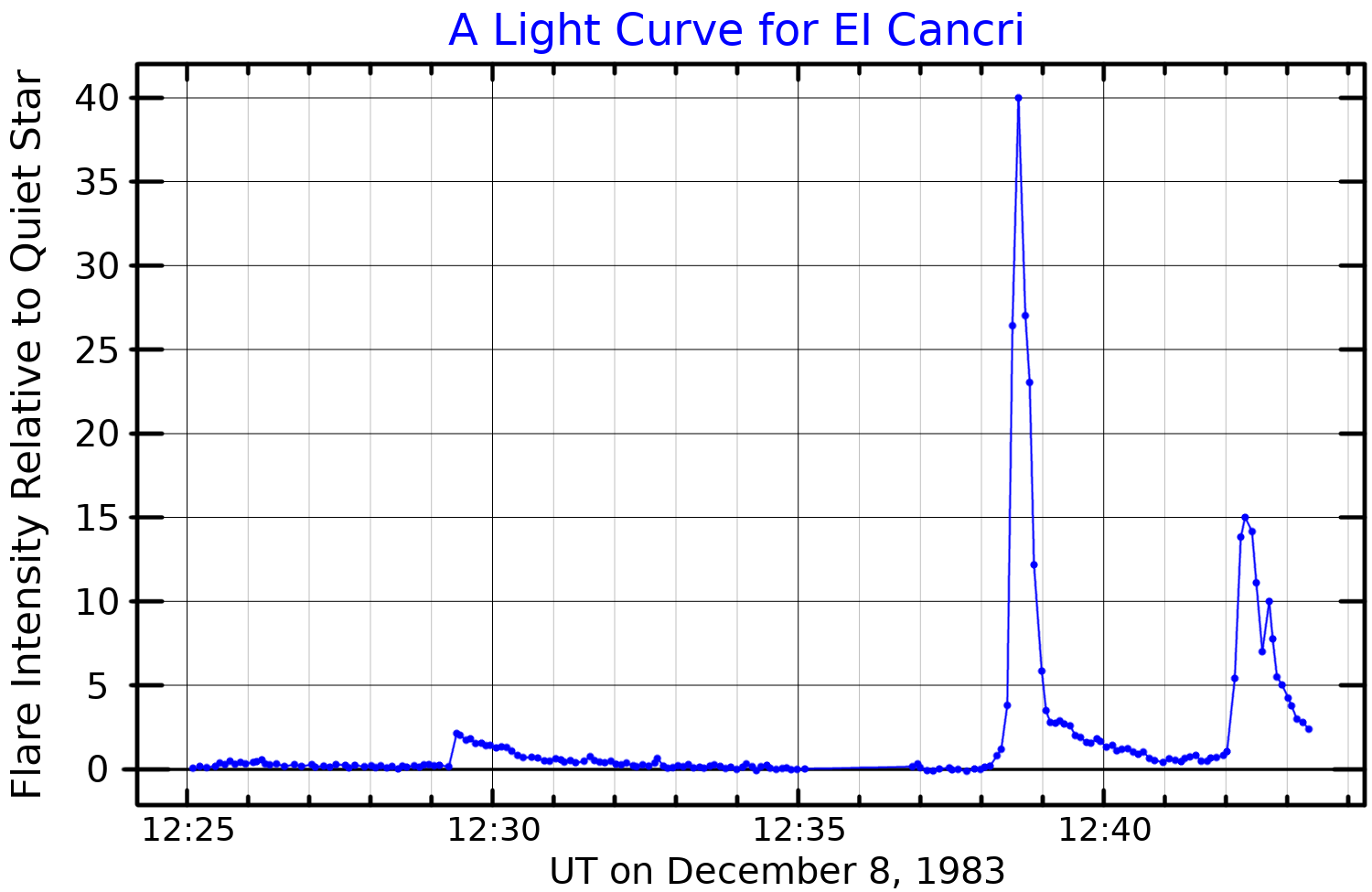
An ultraviolet band light curve showing several flares on EI Cancri, adapted from Pettersen (1985)

In 1985, Bjørn Ragnvald Pettersen announced his discovery that the star shows very high stellar flare activity, with an average of five flares per hour. It was given its variable star designation, EI Cancri, in 1987.
