= Gliese 569 =

Nearby red dwarf in the constellation Boötes

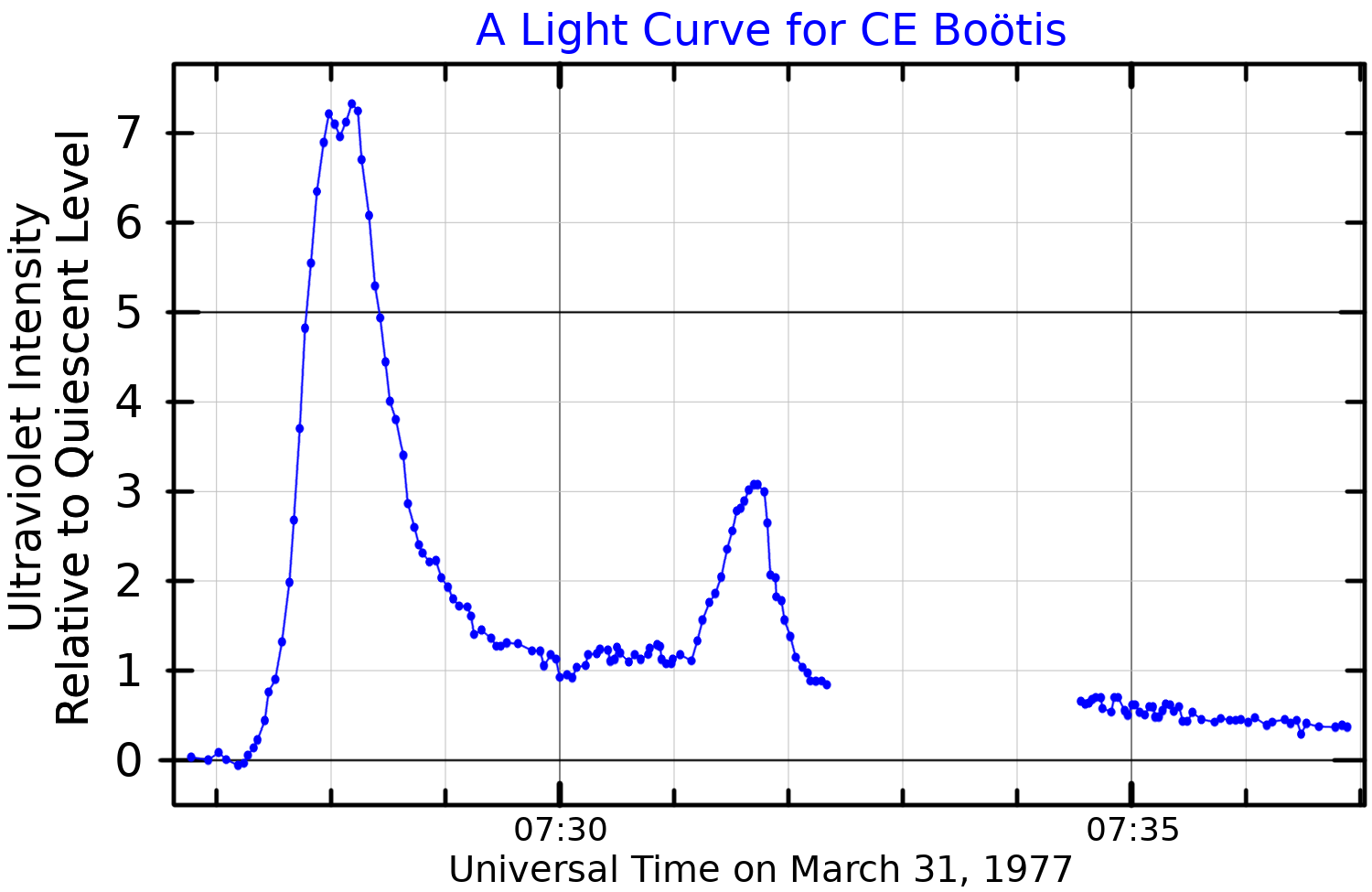
- An ultraviolet band light curve for a flare on CE Boötis, adapted from Hansen and Veeder (1977)

Observation data Epoch J2000 Equinox ICRS
- Constellation: Boötes
- Gliese 569 A
- Right ascension: 14^{h} 54^{m} 29.2362^{s}
- Declination: +16° 06′ 03.798″
- Apparent magnitude (V): 10.15
- Gliese 569 B
- Right ascension: 14^{h} 54^{m} 29.7686^{s}
- Declination: +16° 06′ 05.627″

Characteristics

Gliese 569 A
- Evolutionary stage: main-sequence star
- Spectral type: M3
- Apparent magnitude (g): 9.12
- Variable type: Flare star

Gliese 569 B
- Spectral type: M8.5+M9
- Apparent magnitude (g): 15.32

Astrometry

Gliese 569 A
Radial velocity (R_{v})	−8.00±0.17 km/s
Proper motion (μ)	RA: +279.12±0.02 mas/yr Dec.: −117.91±0.02 mas/yr
Parallax (π)	100.5243±0.0210 mas
Distance	32.446 ± 0.007 ly (9.948 ± 0.002 pc)

Orbit
Primary	Gliese 569 Ba
Name	Gliese 569 Bb
Period (P)	870±9 days
Semi-major axis (a)	(90.1±0.7)×10^{−3}" (0.89±0.02 AU)
Eccentricity (e)	0.317±0.010
Inclination (i)	30.0±1.6°
Longitude of the node (Ω)	313±4°
Periastron epoch (T)	2010.263±0.012
Argument of periastron (ω) (secondary)	262.5±2.2°

Details

Gliese 569 A
Mass	0.48 M_{☉}
Radius	0.43 R_{☉}
Luminosity	0.034±0.008 L_{☉}
Temperature	3,649±79 K
Rotation	14.7 days
Age	<700 Myr

Gliese 569 Ba
Mass	0.081±0.010 M_{☉}
Radius	0.119±0.020 R_{☉}
Luminosity	4.5+0.8 −0.7×10^{−4} L_{☉}
Surface gravity (log g)	4.5 cgs
Temperature	2,440±100 K
Rotational velocity (v sin i)	19 km/s
Age	<700 Myr

Gliese 569 Bb
Mass	0.059±0.007 M_{☉}
Radius	0.102±0.020 R_{☉}
Luminosity	2.6+0.5 −0.4×10^{−4} L_{☉}
Surface gravity (log g)	4.5 cgs
Temperature	2,305±100 K
Rotational velocity (v sin i)	6 km/s
Age	<700 Myr

Other designations
- Gliese 569, BD+16 2708, G 136-28, GSC 01478-00495, HIP 72944, 2MASS J14542923+1606039, TYC 1478-495-1, CE Boötis, WDS J14545+1606

Database references
SIMBAD	Gliese 569 A
- Gliese 569 B

Gliese 569 is a star in the constellation Boötes. It is orbited by a pair of brown dwarfs. The system lies 32.45 light years away.

== System ==
The primary star GJ 569A is orbited by the much fainter (3.7 magnitudes) secondary GJ 659B at a projected separation of 5.92 arcseconds, discovered in 1988. The star GJ 569B (BD+16 2708B) itself is a close binary system of two high-mass brown dwarfs in a 2.4-year orbit, and a small (0.538±0.048) magnitude difference between components. The orbital plane of close binary GJ 569Ba and GJ 569Bb is expected to precess at timescales of about 100 thousand years due to the gravitational influence of GJ 569A.

== Properties ==
The primary star Gliese 569A is a flare star. The star was given its variable star designation, CE Boötis, in 1975. The nature of the brown dwarf binary Gliese 569B is highly uncertain, and it was even suspected Gliese 569Ba itself may be either a low-mass star or a binary object. But with a mass about 8–9% that of the Sun means it may possibly be a binary of two extremely low mass ultra-cool dwarf stars that are extremely dim, dim enough to look like a brown dwarf. Both brown dwarfs are weakly variable, likely due to starspot activity.
