= List of exoplanets detected by timing =

This is the list of 20 extrasolar planets that were detected by timing –– 8 by pulsar timing and 12 by variable star timing, sorted by orbital periods. It works by detecting the changes in radio emissions from pulsars caused by the gravity of orbiting planets. The same general mechanism is used for variable stars, although usually in visible light rather than radio.

== Planets ==
The most massive planet detected by timing is HW Virginis b, which masses 19.2 M_{J}; the least massive planet is PSR B1257+12 b, which masses 0.00007 M_{J} or 0.022 M_{🜨}. The longest period of any planets detected by timing is PSR B1620-26 b, which is 36525 days or 100 years; the shortest period is SDSS J1228+1040 b, which is 0.0857 days.

There are 9 members of multi-planet systems, including three orbiting around PSR B1257+12.

== List ==
Yellow rows donate the members of multi-planet systems. Source:
| Planet | Mass (M_{J}) | Radius (R_{J}) | Period (d) | Semi-major axis (AU) | Eccentricity | Inclination (°) | Year of discovery |
|---|---|---|---|---|---|---|---|
| XTE J1807-294 b | 14.5 | | 0.0278292 | 0.0020575 | | | 2005 |
| PSR J0636+5129 b | 8 | | 0.067 | 0.18455 | | | 2016 |
| SDSS J1228+1040 b | | 0.0009 | 0.0857 | 0.0034 | | | 2019 |
| PSR J1719-1438 b | ~ 1 | ~ 0.4 | 0.090706293 | 0.004 | < 0.06 | | 2011 |
| PSR J2241-5236 b | 12 | | 0.1456722395 | 0.005989 | 0 | | 2011 |
| PSR J2322-2650 b | 0.7949 | | 0.322963997 | 0.0102 | | | 2017 |
| Draugr | 0.00007 | | 25.262 | 0.19 | 0 | ~50 | 1994 |
| Kepler-451d | 1.76 | | 43 | 0.2 | 0 | | 2022 |
| Poltergeist | 0.013 | | 66.5419 | 0.36 | 0.0186 | 53 | 1992 |
| Phobetor | 0.012 | | 98.2114 | 0.46 | 0.0252 | 47 | 1992 |
| Kepler-47d | 0.05984 | 0.6281 | 187.35 | 0.6992 | 0.024 | 90 | 2013 |
| TIC 172900988 b | 2.84 | 0.9874 | 188.763 | 0.867 | 0.089 | | 2021 |
| Kepler-451b | 1.86 | | 406 | 0.9 | 0.33 | | 2015 |
| PSR B0943+10 b | 2.8 | | 730 | 1.8 | | | 2014 |
| V391 Pegasi b | 3.2 | | 1170 | 1.7 | 0 | | 2007 |
| DW Lyncis b | 5.58 | | 1450 | 1.148 | | | 2013 |
| PSR B0943+10 c | 2.6 | | 1460 | 2.9 | | | 2014 |
| Kepler-451c | 1.61 | | 1800 | 2.1 | 0.29 | | 2022 |
| UZ Fornacis c | 7.7 | | 1900 | 2.8 | 0.05 | | 2011 |
| HU Aquarii b | 5.4 | | 2359 | 3.45 | 0.075 | | 2009 |
| NN Serpentis d | 2.28 | | 2830 | 3.39 | 0.2 | | 2009 |
| NY Virginis b | 2.3 | | 2900 | 3.39 | | | 2011 |
| OGLE-GD-ECL-11388 b | 12.5 | | 3250 | 3.642 | | | 2016 |
| NSVS 14256825 d | 13.24 | | 3317.7 | 3.12 | 0.12 | | 2017 |
| FL Lyrae b | 9 | | 4400 | 6.835 | | | 2015 |
| V470 Camelopardalis b | 11.8 | | 4847 | 4.71 | | | 2020 |
| RR Caeli b | 4.2 | | 5479 | 5.3 | 0 | | 2012 |
| HU Aquarii c | 5.9 | | 5646 | 6.18 | 0.29 | | 2011 |
| NN Serpentis c | 6.91 | | 5660 | 5.38 | 0 | | 2010 |
| KIC 10544976 b | 13.4 | | 6136 | 6.56 | 0.29 | | 2019 |
| OY Carinae b | 8.48 | | 6394 | 6.18 | | | 2014 |
| HW Virginis b | 39 | 1 | 9750 | 4.69 | 0.41 | | 2008 |
| NY Virginis c | 4.49 | | 9861.75 | 7.54 | | | 2011 |
| PSR B0329+54 b | 0.0062 | | 10139.34 | 10.26 | 0.236 | | 2017 |
| DP Leonis b | 6.05 | | 10230 | 8.19 | 0.39 | | 2009 |
| SW Sextantis b | 14 | | 13357 | | | | 2019 |
| HW Virginis c | 40 | 2 | 17000 | 12.8 | 0.47 | | 2008 |
| PSR B1620-26 b | 2.5 | | ~36525 | ~23 | | | 1993 |
