= HU Aquarii =

Star in the constellation Aquarius

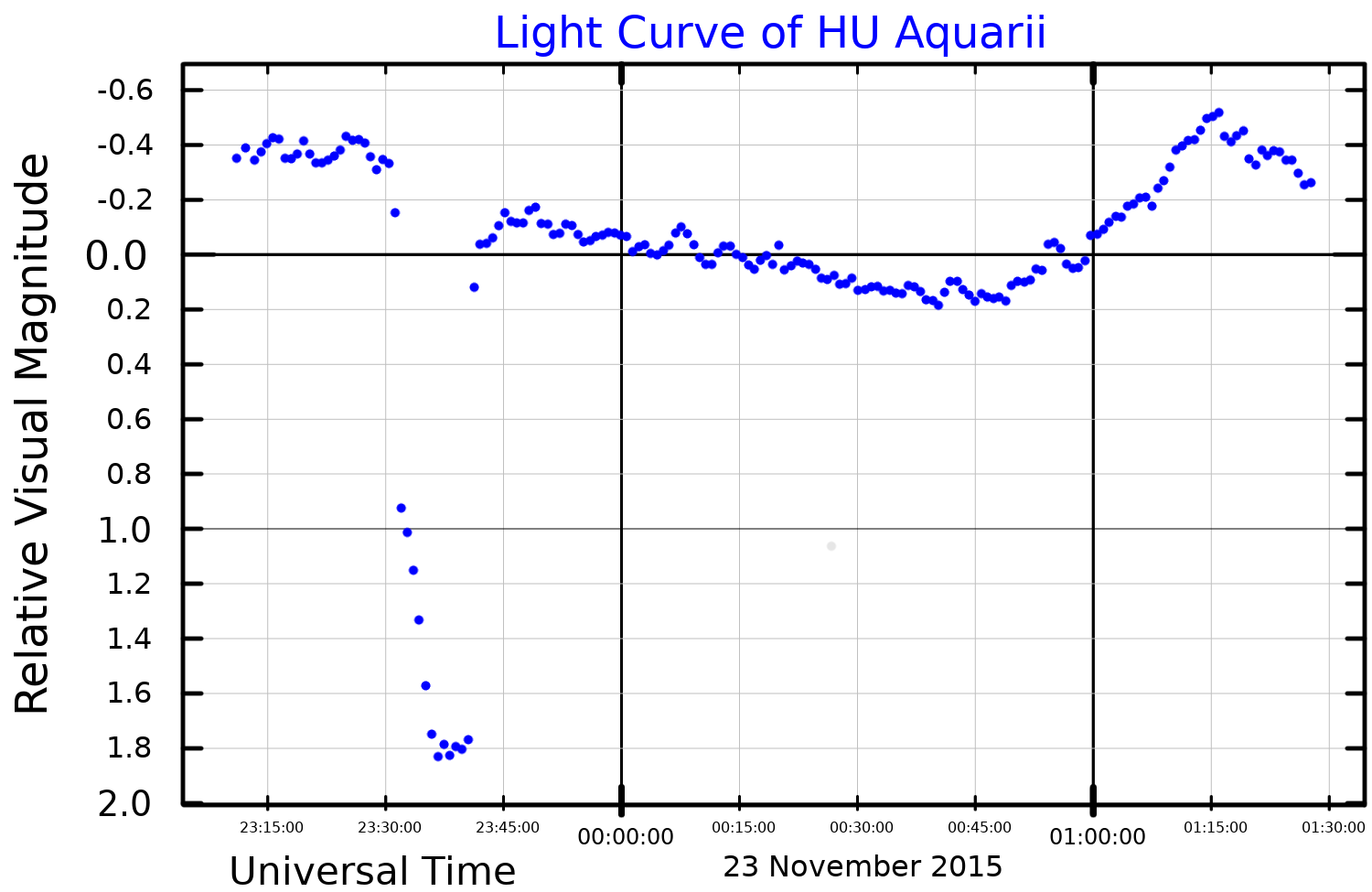
- The visual band light curve of HU Aquarii, adapted from Shengbang et al. (2016)

Observation data Epoch J2000 Equinox ICRS
- Constellation: Aquarius
- Right ascension: 21^{h} 07^{m} 58.19445^{s}
- Declination: −05° 17′ 40.5577″
- Apparent magnitude (V): +15.8 - 19.8

Characteristics
- Evolutionary stage: white dwarf + main sequence
- Spectral type: D + M4V
- Variable type: AM Herculis

Astrometry
Proper motion (μ)	RA: −64.579 mas/yr Dec.: −62.732 mas/yr
Parallax (π)	5.2354±0.0457 mas
Distance	623 ± 5 ly (191 ± 2 pc)

Orbit
Period (P)	2.08 hours
Inclination (i)	87.4±0.9°

Details

HU Aqr A
Mass	0.78±0.02 M_{☉}
Temperature	14,000 K

HU Aqr B
Mass	0.17±0.01 M_{☉}

Other designations
- HU Aqr, RBS 1724, RE J210755-051621, 1RXS J210758.5-051744, 1AXG J210759-0518, 2RE J210755-051630, RE J2107-051, EUVE J2108-05.2, 2RE J2107-051, RX J2107.9-0518, AAVSO 2102-05, GSC 05200-00849, RE J2107-05, RX J2107.9-0517, 2MASS J21075818-0517404

Database references
SIMBAD	data

HU Aquarii (abbreviated HU Aqr) is an eclipsing binary system approximately 623 light-years away from the Sun, forming a cataclysmic variable of AM Herculis-type. The two stars orbit each other every 2.08 hours and the ultra-short binary system includes an eclipsing white dwarf and red dwarf.

In 1993, Axel Schwope et al. discovered that the star, then called RXJ2107.9-0518, was both an eclipsing binary and a cataclysmic variable. The star had been flagged as a probable AM Herculis star from data collected during the ROSAT All Sky Survey. It was given its variable star designation, HU Aquarii, in 1995.

== Eclipse timing variations ==
The HU Aquarii binary system exhibits variations in the timing of the eclipses. Schwarz et al. (2009) note that the variations are too large to be caused by the Applegate mechanism, and are within the expected range of magnetic braking but 30 times too large to be caused by gravitational radiation alone. As an alternative explanation, they suggested that the variations might be caused by an object in orbit around the binary, causing it to move back and forth along the line-of-sight to the system. In March 2011, Qian et al. claimed the presence of two planets, though the proposed orbits were subsequently shown to be unstable and on orbits determined from a more thorough and precise analysis of the observational data. Indeed, it seems likely that the signal that was interpreted as being the result of planetary companions might be instead the result of not well-studied interactions between the white dwarf and its red dwarf companion: as of 2014 all proposed orbital solutions have been refuted and it appears that the full set of timing measurements is inconsistent with any 1, 2 or 3-planet system due to poor fits to the data and unstable orbital configurations. With new data gathered by 2018, the existence of planetary system remains elusive, as no model fitting all observations can be made.

== See also ==
- HW Virginis
- NN Serpentis
- QS Virginis
- Kepler-16
