= NSVS 14256825 =

Eclipsing binary star in the constellation Aquila

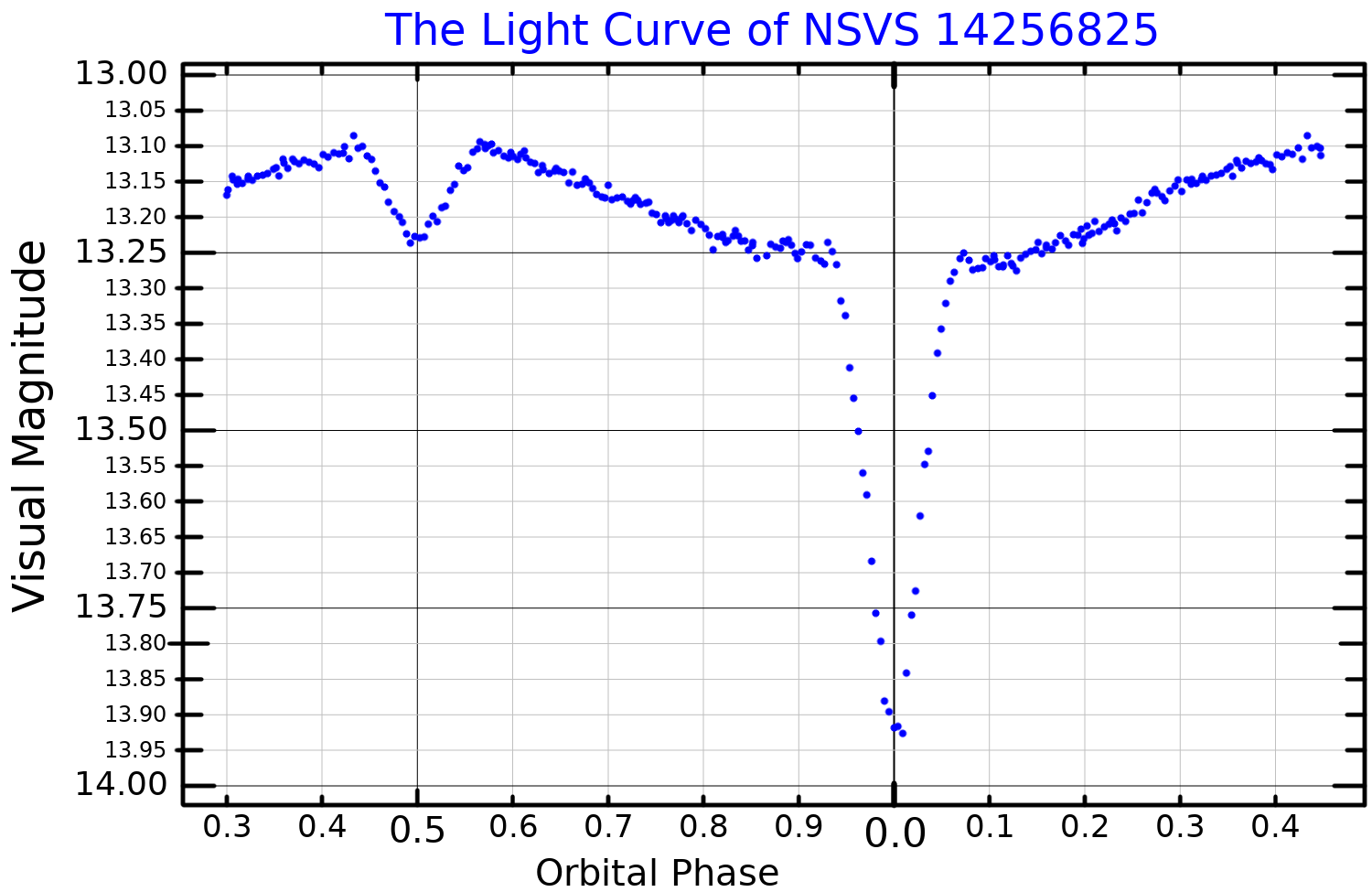
- A visual band light curve for NSVS 14256825, adapted from Almeida et al. (2012)

Observation data Epoch J2000 Equinox ICRS
- Constellation: Aquila
- Right ascension: 20^{h} 20^{m} 00.45867^{s}
- Declination: +04° 37′ 56.5198″
- Apparent magnitude (V): 13.2

Characteristics
- Spectral type: sdO / M V

Astrometry
Radial velocity (R_{v})	12.10±1.5 km/s
Proper motion (μ)	RA: 8.063 mas/yr Dec.: 1.133 mas/yr
Parallax (π)	1.1929±0.0599 mas
Distance	2,700 ± 100 ly (840 ± 40 pc)

Orbit
Period (P)	0.110374230 d
Inclination (i)	82.5°
Periastron epoch (T)	2454274.20874 JD

Details
Mass	0.528 M_{☉}
Temperature	42,000 K

Other designations
- V1828 Aql, 2MASS J20200045+0437564

Database references
SIMBAD	data

NSVS 14256825, also known as V1828 Aquilae, is an eclipsing binary system (of the Algol type) in the constellation of Aquila. The system comprises a subdwarf O star and red dwarf star. The two stars orbit each other every 2.648976 hours. Based on the stellar parallax of the system, observed by Gaia, the system is located approximately 2,700 light-years (840 parsecs) away.

In 2007, Patrick Wils et al. discovered that NSVS 14256825 is an eclipsing binary, by examining the Northern Sky Variability Survey (NSVS) data. They also classified it as an HW Virginis type star, a binary pair in which variability arises from one star reflecting the light of the other as they orbit each other.

== Nomenclature ==
The system is most commonly referred to using its designation from the NSVS, a survey of stars with apparent magnitudes between 8 and 15.5. It also has a variable star designation, V1828 Aquilae.

== Eclipse timing variations ==
NSVS 14256825 has been very well-studied using photometry, but the resulting models often contradict each other, even with similar statistical significance, or with data that are collected later. Many studies have found that this system exhibits eclipse timing variations (ETVs) that are significant, cyclic and not explainable by other stellar mechanisms such as the Applegate mechanism. In 2012, it was found that the orbit of NSVS 14256825 was increasing at a rate of 12×10^{−12} days per orbit.

Initially, in 2012 it was claimed that two giant planets were in orbit around the binary, with masses of 2.9 and 8.1 times the Jupiter mass orbiting with periods of 3.5 and 6.9 years respectively. Another paper claimed the existence of one planet with a mass 12 times that of Jupiter, in a 20-year orbit. However, subsequent studies have come up with different results with masses up to 15 M_{J} and periods down to 8.83 years. Studies also do not agree on whether one substellar body can explain the ETVs, or whether additional companions are necessary, but further research is needed to obtain better coverage of data. In 2025 it was found that all models fail to predict new changes in eclipse timing. While this does not rule out the existence of the planets, it is possible that multiple mechanisms are responsible for the ETVs.

== See also ==
- HW Virginis
- CM Draconis
- QS Virginis
- NN Serpentis
- List of extrasolar planets
