= Ross 458 =

Binary star in the constellation Virgo

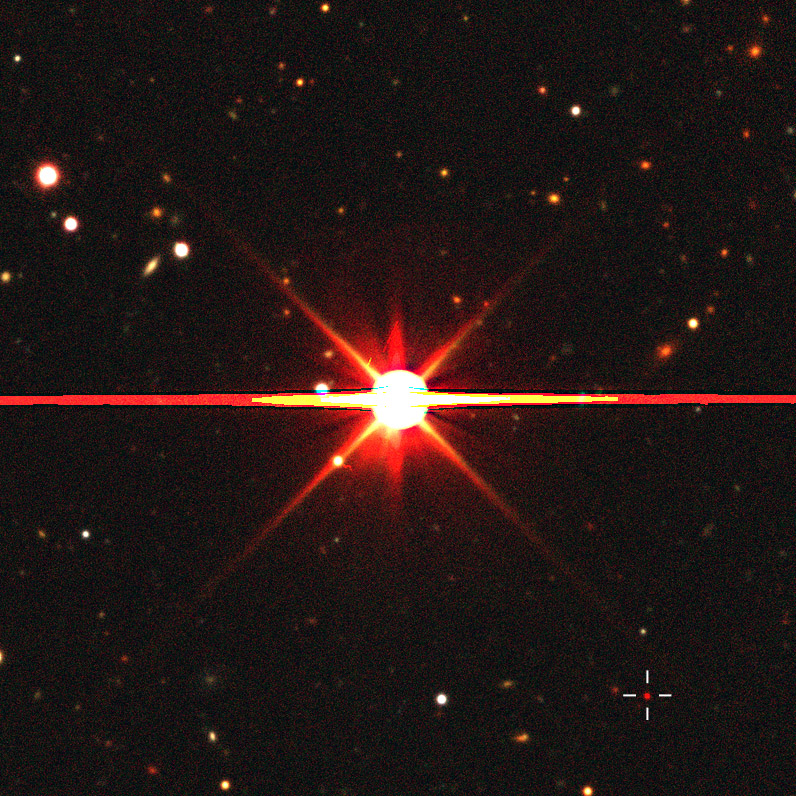
- Image of Ross 458 with the legacy surveys. The companion is the red object marked with an crosshair in the lower right.

Observation data Epoch J2000 Equinox ICRS
- Constellation: Virgo
- Right ascension: 13^{h} 00^{m} 46.557^{s}
- Declination: +12° 22′ 32.68″
- Apparent magnitude (V): 9.79

Characteristics
- Evolutionary stage: Main sequence
- Spectral type: M0.5 + M7.0
- U−B color index: 1.12
- B−V color index: 1.44

Astrometry
Radial velocity (R_{v})	−12.33±0.32 km/s
Proper motion (μ)	RA: −628.7±0.184 mas/yr Dec.: −33.5±0.133 mas/yr
Parallax (π)	86.9010±0.1170 mas
Distance	37.53 ± 0.05 ly (11.51 ± 0.02 pc)
Absolute magnitude (M_{V})	+9.47

Orbit
Primary	A
Name	B
Period (P)	13.63±0.03 yr
Semi-major axis (a)	4.93±0.01 AU
Eccentricity (e)	0.245±0.001
Inclination (i)	130.3±0.3°
Longitude of the node (Ω)	56.25±0.17°
Periastron epoch (T)	2007.67±0.02
Argument of periastron (ω) (secondary)	157.5±0.6°

Details

A
Mass	0.553±0.007 M_{☉}
Radius	0.593±0.001 R_{☉}
Luminosity	0.044+0.016 −0.012 L_{☉}
Surface gravity (log g)	4.659±0.002 cgs
Temperature	3,672.4+3.1 −3.2 K
Metallicity	$\begin{smallmatrix}\left[\ce{M}/\ce{H}\right]\end{smallmatrix}$ = 0.043+0.005 −0.006
Rotation	2.89 d
Rotational velocity (v sin i)	9.6±0.9 km/s
Age	400–800 Myr

B
Mass	88.9+1.8 −2.8 M_{Jup}
Radius	0.106+0.006 −0.004 R_{☉}
Surface gravity (log g)	5.377+0.037 −0.053 cgs
Temperature	2,994+4 −9 K
Metallicity	$\begin{smallmatrix}\left[\ce{M}/\ce{H}\right]\end{smallmatrix}$ = 0.043+0.005 −0.006

C
Mass	8.24+0.80 −0.75 M_{Jup}
Radius	0.85±0.02 R_{Jup}
Luminosity	5.37+0.08 −0.06×10^{−6} L_{☉}
Surface gravity (log g)	4.12±0.04 cgs
Temperature	771+7 −8 K
Metallicity	$\begin{smallmatrix}\left[\ce{M}/\ce{H}\right]\end{smallmatrix}$ = 0.05+0.03 −0.02

Other designations
- DT Vir, BD+13°2618, GJ 494, HIP 63510, LHS 2665, LTT 13752, Ross 458, Wolf 462

Database references
SIMBAD	data
Exoplanet Archive	data
ARICNS	data

Ross 458, also referred to as DT Virginis, is a binary star system in the constellation of Virgo. It has an apparent visual magnitude of 9.79 and is located at a distance of 37.6 light-years from the Sun. Both of the stars are low-mass red dwarfs with at least one of them being a flare star. This binary system has a circumbinary sub-stellar companion.

== Description ==
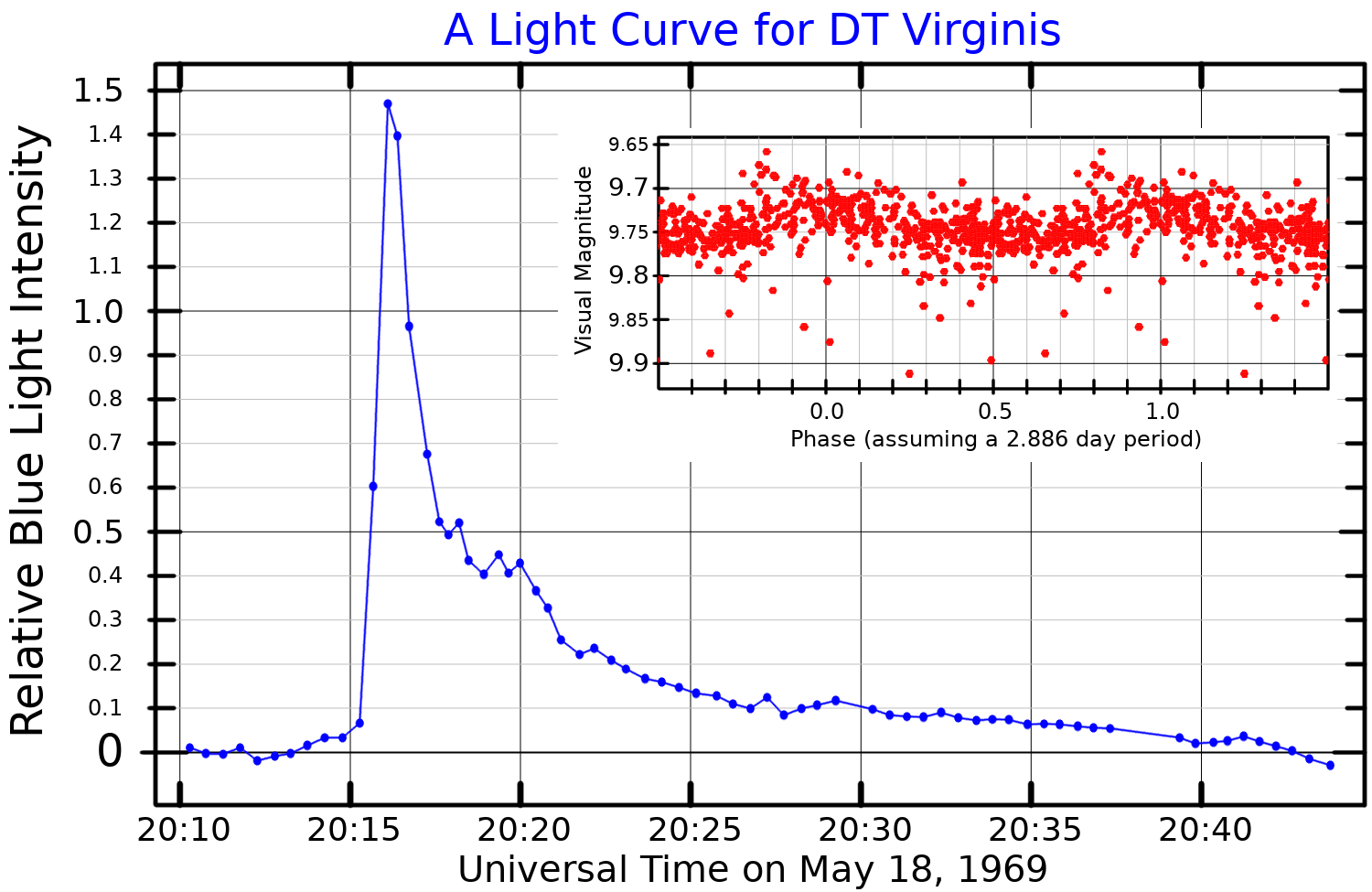
A light curve for Ross 458. The main plot, adapted from Shakhovskaya (1969), shows the intensity of a flare relative to the star's quiescent intensity. The inset plot, adapted from Kiraga (2012), shows the periodic variation.

This star was mentioned as a suspected variable by M. Petit in 1957. In 1960, O. J. Eggen classified it as a member of the Hyades moving group based on the system's space motion; it is now considered a likely member of the Carina Near Moving Group. Two flares were reported from this star in 1969 by N. I. Shakhovskaya, confirming it as a flare star. It was identified as an astrometric binary in 1994 by W. D. Heintz, who found a period of 14.5 years. The pair were resolved using adaptive optics in 1999. Early mass estimates placed the companion near the substellar limit, and it was initially proposed as a brown dwarf but is now considered late-type red dwarf.

The primary member, component A, is an M-type main-sequence star with a stellar classification of M0.5. It is young, magnetically very active star with a high rate of rotation and strong Hα emission. The star experiences star spots that cover 10–15% of the surface It is smaller and less massive than the Sun. The star is radiating just 4.4% of the luminosity of the Sun from its photosphere at an effective temperature of 3,484 K.

== Substellar companion ==
A distant sub-stellar companion to the binary star system was discovered in 2010 as part of a deep infrared sky survey. This is most likely a T8 spectral type brown dwarf with an estimated rotation period of 6.75±1.58 h. The object varies slightly in brightness, which may be due to patchy clouds. The companion lacks detectable oxygen in the atmosphere, implying its formation from sequestrated source or peculiar atmospheric chemistry. Analysis of its chemical composition show it to be similar to that of Ross 458 A, indicating that the object formed in a stellar-like manner.

== See also ==
- CM Draconis
- GU Piscium b
- HD 106906 b
- Kepler-16
- Lists of exoplanets
- NN Serpentis
- QS Virginis
- WD 0806-661
