= Z Chamaeleontis =

Variable star in the constellation Chamaeleon

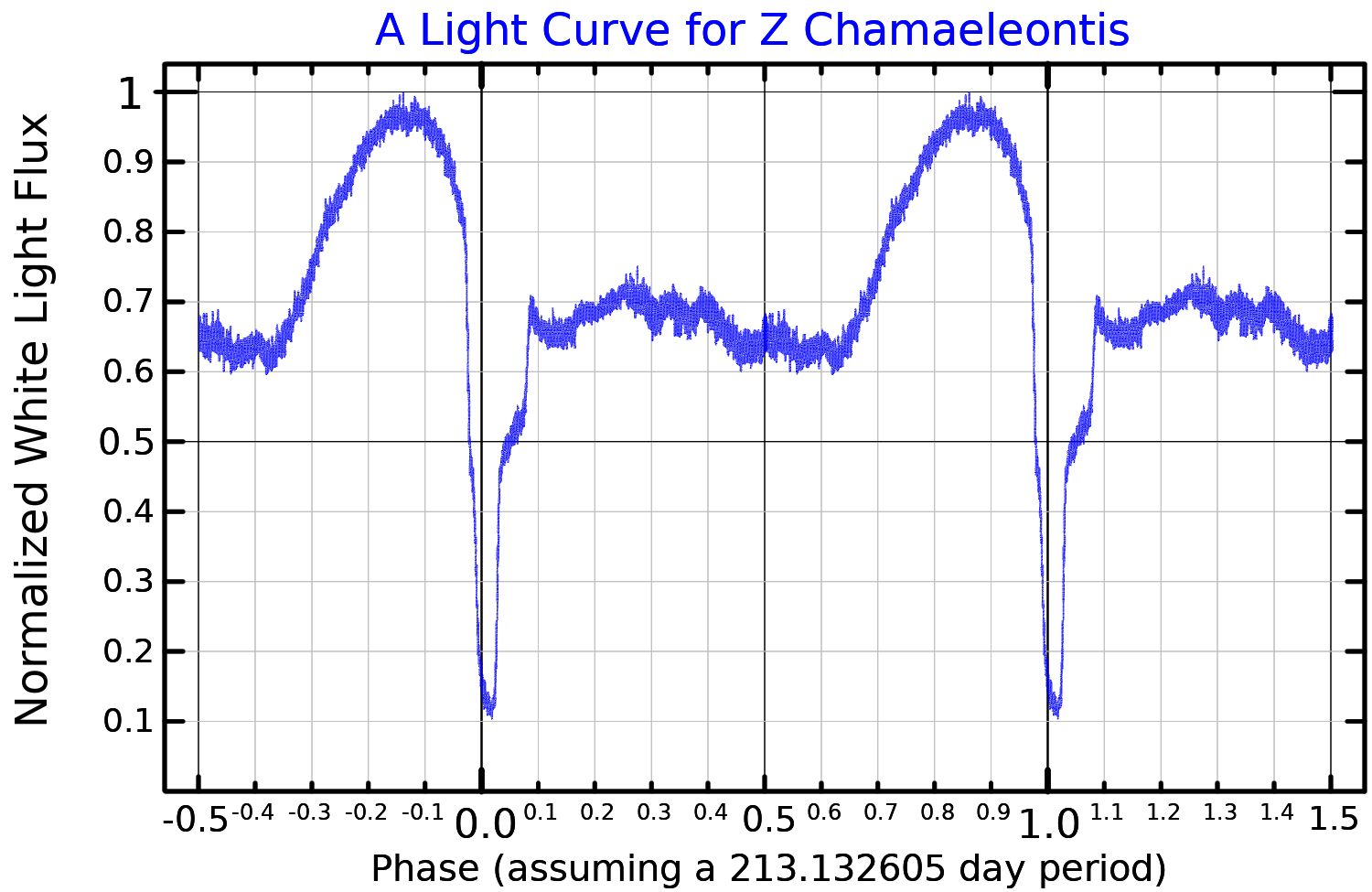
- A light curve for Z Chamaeleontis, adapted from Wood et al. (1986)

Observation data Epoch J2000 Equinox ICRS
- Constellation: Chamaeleon
- Right ascension: 08^{h} 07^{m} 27.7518^{s}
- Declination: −76° 32′ 00.665″
- Apparent magnitude (V): 11.5 - 16.2

Characteristics
- Spectral type: DA? + M5.5e
- Variable type: SU UMa + Algol

Astrometry
Radial velocity (R_{v})	−20 km/s
Proper motion (μ)	RA: −33.650 mas/yr Dec.: +56.883 mas/yr
Parallax (π)	8.2805±0.074 mas
Distance	394 ± 4 ly (121 ± 1 pc)

Orbit
Primary	white dwarf
Secondary	red dwarf
Period (P)	0.0744992631(3) days (1.79 h)
Semi-major axis (a)	0.734±0.005 R_{☉}
Eccentricity (e)	0
Inclination (i)	80.44±0.11°
Semi-amplitude (K_{1}) (primary)	78.4+1.1 −1.8 km/s
Semi-amplitude (K_{2}) (secondary)	413.2+2.5 −2.0 km/s

Details

white dwarf
Mass	0.803±0.014 M_{☉}
Radius	0.01046±0.00017 R_{☉}
Surface gravity (log g)	8.304±0.016 cgs
Temperature	16,300±1,400 K

red dwarf
Mass	0.152±0.005 M_{☉}
Radius	0.1820±0.0020 R_{☉}

Other designations
- Z Cha, 2E 1942, SBC9 505, CSV 1244, 2MASS J08072774-7632006, SON 4893, 2E 0808.8-7622, 1RXS J080728.8-763157, AAVSO 0809-76

Database references
SIMBAD	data

Z Chamaeleontis (abbreviated Z Cha) is a dwarf nova variable star system approximately 394 light-years away from the Sun, where two stars orbit each other every 1.78 hours. The system comprises an eclipsing white dwarf and red dwarf and possibly a yet unconfirmed third low-mass substellar companion.

Z Chamaeleontis was discovered in 1904, during the work required to produce the Astrographic Catalogue. By 1905 a period of variability had been derived. in 1969, George S. Mumford discovered that in addition to being a dwarf nova, the star is an eclipsing variable.

== Substellar companion ==
Dai et al. (2009) invoke the presence of a third object to explain orbital period variations with an apparent periodicity of roughly 28 years. The third body could yield a minimum mass 20 times greater than Jupiter and be located 9.9 Astronomical Units away from the dwarf nova, being likely a low-mass brown dwarf.

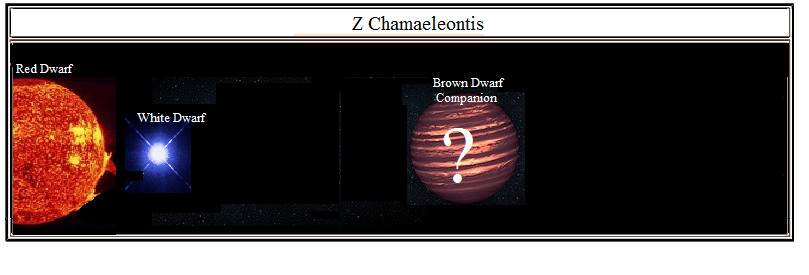
Possible makeup of the Z Chamaeleontis Star system.

The Z Chamaeleontis planetary system
Companion (in order from star)	Mass	Semimajor axis (AU)	Orbital period (years)	Eccentricity	Inclination (°)	Radius
b (unconfirmed)	≥20 M_{J}	9.9	28	≤0.2	—	—

== See also ==
- HW Virginis
- NN Serpentis
- OY Carinae
