= DP Leonis =

Star system in the constellation Leo

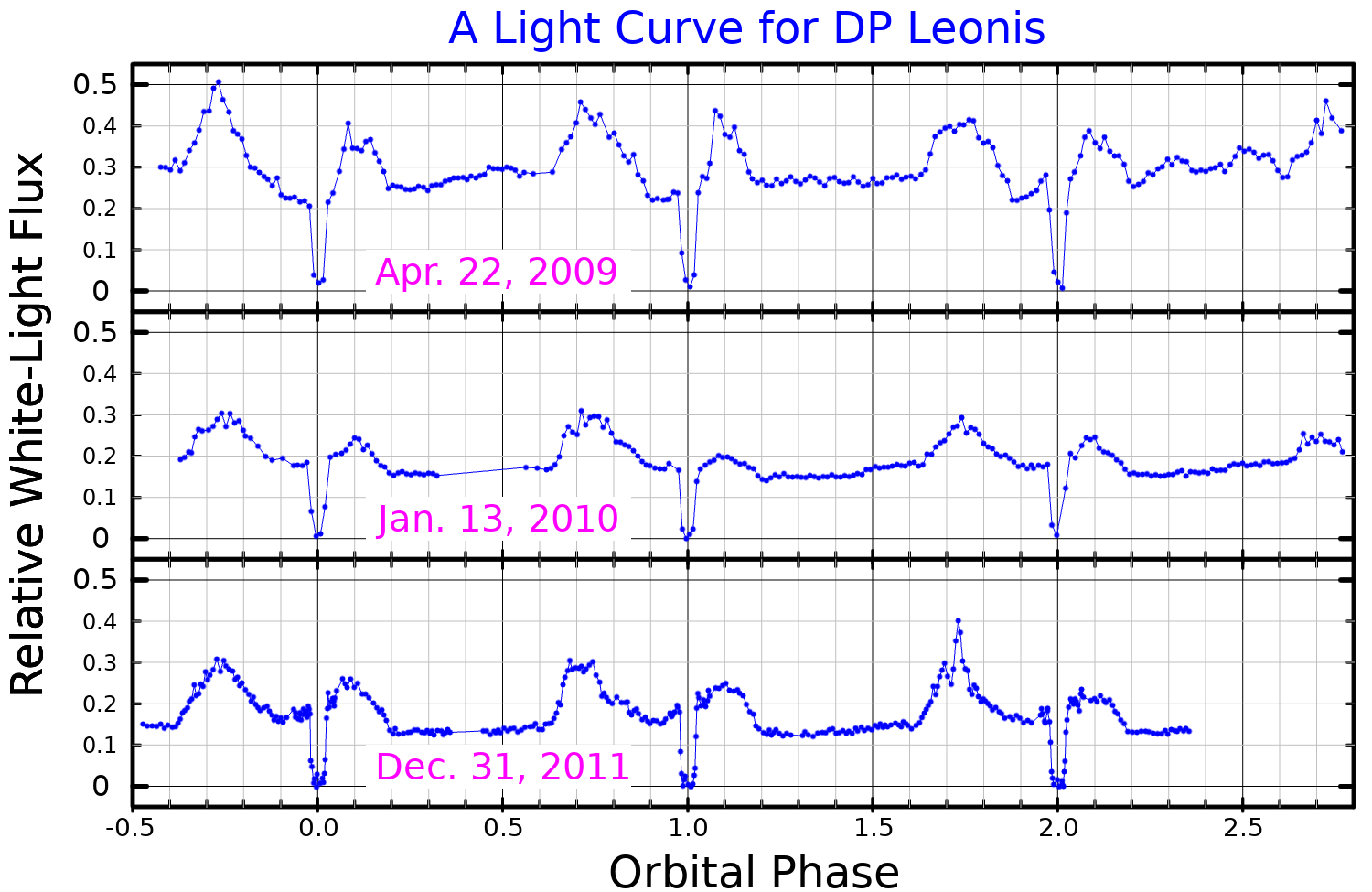
- A white-light light curve for DP Leonis, adapted from Beuermann et al. (2014)

Observation data Epoch J2000.0 Equinox ICRS
- Constellation: Leo
- Right ascension: 11^{h} 17^{m} 15.92381^{s}
- Declination: +17° 57′ 41.6804″
- Apparent magnitude (V): 17.5-19

Characteristics
- Variable type: AM Her

Astrometry
Radial velocity (R_{v})	0.0 km/s
Proper motion (μ)	RA: −28.700 mas/yr Dec.: −1.444 mas/yr
Parallax (π)	3.2781±0.3110 mas
Distance	990 ± 90 ly (310 ± 30 pc)

Orbit
Period (P)	0.0623628426 yr
Eccentricity (e)	0.0 (fixed)
Inclination (i)	79.5°

Details

White dwarf
Mass	0.6 M_{☉}
Temperature	13,500 K

Donor star
Mass	0.09 M_{☉}

Other designations
- DP Leo, X 11146+182

Database references
SIMBAD	data
Exoplanet Archive	data

DP Leonis (abbreviated DP Leo) is a binary star system in the equatorial constellation of Leo. It is a variable star that ranges in apparent visual magnitude from 17.5 down to 19. The system is located at a distance of approximately 990 light-years from the Sun based on parallax. It is a cataclysmic variable star of the AM Herculis-type also known as polars. The system comprises an eclipsing white dwarf and red dwarf in tight orbit (nearly 1.5 hours) and an extrasolar planet. This eclipsing variable was discovered by P. Biermann and associates in 1982 as the optical counterpart to the EINSTEIN X-ray source E1114+182.

== Planetary system ==
In 2010, Qian et al. announced the detection of a third body of planetary mass around the eclipsing binary system. The presence of a third body had already been suspected in 2002. The object is roughly 6 times more massive than Jupiter and is located 8.6 AU from the binary.

The DP Leonis planetary system
Companion (in order from star)	Mass	Semimajor axis (AU)	Orbital period (years)	Eccentricity	Inclination (°)	Radius
b	≥6.1 ± 0.5 M_{J}	8.2 ± 0.4	28.0 ± 2.0	0.39 ± 0.13	—	—

== See also ==
- NN Serpentis
- QS Virginis
- Lists of exoplanets
