= DM Ursae Majoris =

Variable star in the constellation Ursa Major

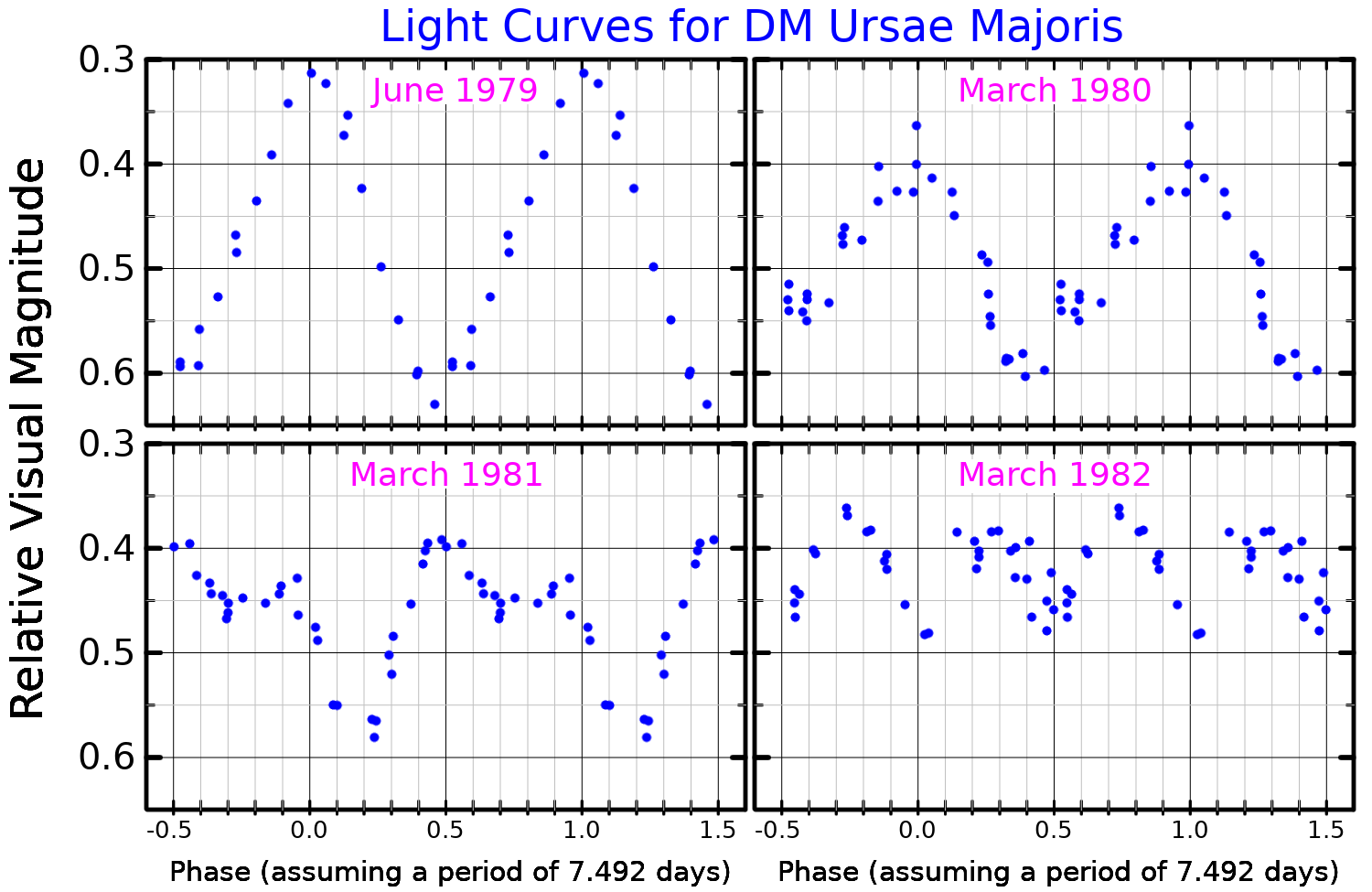
- Visual band light curves for DM Ursae Majoris, adapted from Mohin et al. (1985)

Observation data Epoch J2000 Equinox ICRS
- Constellation: Ursa Major
- Right ascension: 10^{h} 55^{m} 43.544^{s}
- Declination: +60° 28′ 09.72″
- Apparent magnitude (V): 9.29

Characteristics
- Spectral type: K0III-IV (K0IV + K5V)
- B−V color index: 1.014±0.026
- Variable type: RS CVn

Astrometry
Radial velocity (R_{v})	−6.9±1.2 km/s
Proper motion (μ)	RA: −37.912 mas/yr Dec.: −7.566 mas/yr
Parallax (π)	5.3862±0.0157 mas
Distance	606 ± 2 ly (185.7 ± 0.5 pc)
Absolute magnitude (M_{V})	3.65

Orbit
Period (P)	7.4920±0.0009 d
Eccentricity (e)	0.0 (assumed)
Inclination (i)	40°
Periastron epoch (T)	2,443,881.4±0.1 JD
Argument of periastron (ω) (secondary)	0.0 (assumed)°
Semi-amplitude (K_{1}) (primary)	27.6 km/s

Details

Primary
Mass	~1.2 M_{☉}
Radius	6.00 R_{☉}
Luminosity	4.24 L_{☉}
Temperature	4,500 K

Secondary
Mass	~0.7 M_{☉}

Other designations
- 2A 1052+606, DM UMa, BD+61°1211, HIP 53425, SAO 15338, PPM 17646

Database references
SIMBAD	data

DM Ursae Majoris is a binary star system in the northern circumpolar constellation of Ursa Major, abbreviated DM UMa. It is sometimes identified by the Bonner Durchmusterung catalogue designation BD +61 1211; DM UMa is the variable star designation. The system has a combined apparent visual magnitude of 9.29, which is too faint to be visible to the naked eye. Based on parallax measurements, the system is located at a distance of approximately 606 light years from the Sun, but it is drifting closer with a heliocentric radial velocity of −7 km/s.

In 1978, the X-ray source designated 2A 1052+606 was initially included in the 2A catalogue of observations by the Ariel 5 satellite. The approximate position of this source was determined using the HEAO-1 satellite, then W. Liller matched it with the candidate star SAO 015338 (later DM UMa). He determined the spectra matches a K-type star with strong H-alpha emission lines. In 1979, this object was shown to be an RS Canum Venaticorum variable (RS CVn) by D. Crampton and associates, which indicated this is a close binary star system where one of the components has an active chromosphere with star spots. DM UMa was the first RS CVn variable to be so classified based on its X-ray emission.

Radial velocity measurements demonstrated an orbital period of about 7.5 days. A mass function of 0.016 M_{☉} suggested the system is being viewed from a low inclination, close to pole-on. The system showed variations in emission lines on a time scale of a day. A photometric light curve was generated by R. A. Kimble and associates in 1981, showing strong variability within each orbital period. A model fit to the light curve indicated the star has an extensive distribution of star spots, with regions of enhanced spot activity toward and away from the companion. It is one of the few variables of this class that show a continual emission of H-alpha, although this varies by a factor of three over the course of an orbit.

This is a single-lined spectroscopic binary with the spectra matching a stellar classification of K0III-IV. The secondary is at least 1.5 magnitudes fainter than the primary, so the contribution of the former to the luminosity is no more than 20%. The observed properties of the system can be modeled by a combination of a subgiant primary of class K0IV with a K5V main sequence secondary.
