= AN Ursae Majoris =

Variable star in the constellation Ursa Major

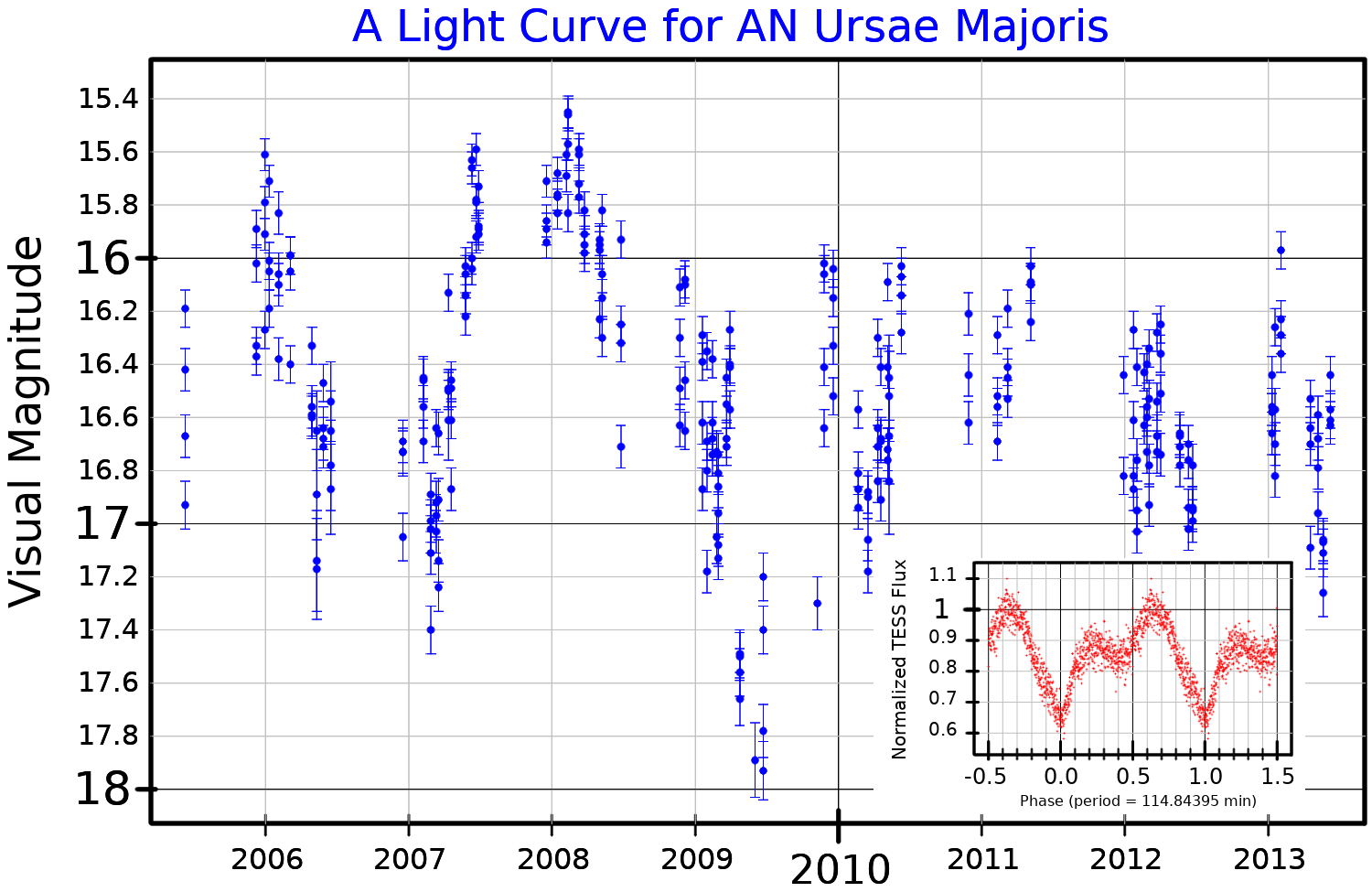
- A light curve for AN Ursae Majoris. The main plot (from Catalina Sky Survey data) shows the long term variation, and the inset plot (from TESS data) shows the variation over the orbital period.

Observation data Epoch J2000.0 Equinox J2000.0
- Constellation: Ursa Major
- Right ascension: 11^{h} 04^{m} 25.65570^{s}
- Declination: +45 03 13.9415°
- Apparent magnitude (V): 14.9 – 20.2

Characteristics
- Spectral type: pec(e+cont) + M4.7
- Variable type: Eclipsing + Polar

Astrometry
Proper motion (μ)	RA: −44.989 mas/yr Dec.: −24.972 mas/yr
Parallax (π)	3.0993±0.1371 mas
Distance	1,050 ± 50 ly (320 ± 10 pc)

Orbit
Period (P)	0.079752867(12) days
Eccentricity (e)	0.00
Periastron epoch (T)	2,444,217.9961 JD
Argument of periastron (ω) (secondary)	0.00°
Semi-amplitude (K_{1}) (primary)	321 km/s

Details

White dwarf
Mass	0.8 M_{☉}
Radius	6,300 km
Temperature	15,000±250 K

Red dwarf
Mass	0.15 M_{☉}

Other designations
- AN UMa, PG 1101+453, S 07738, X 11016+454

Database references
SIMBAD	data

AN Ursae Majoris is a binary star system in the northern circumpolar constellation of Ursa Major. It is a variable star, with AN Ursae Majoris being the variable star designation, and ranges in brightness from magnitude 14.90 down to 20.2. Even at its peak brightness, the system is much too faint to be visible to the naked eye. Based on parallax measurements, the system is located roughly 1,050 light years away from the Sun.

Cuno Hoffmeister announced his discovery of this variable star, in 1963. He erroneously classified it as an RR Lyrae variable. This is a single-lined spectroscopic binary system with a period of 1.92 hours in a close, circular orbit. The pair form an eclipsing binary system that decreases from magnitude 14.9 down to 20.2, once per orbit. This object, along with AM Herculis, define a class of cataclysmic variables known as polars. The pair consist of a low mass white dwarf with a strong magnetic field, interacting with a low–mass main sequence star that has filled its Roche lobe. Matter is being energetically accreted from the main sequence star onto one or both magnetic poles of the white dwarf star, producing emission lines in the spectrum. The magnetic field of the white dwarf has an estimated strength of 35.8 MG.
