= V1054 Ophiuchi =

Star system in the constellation Ophiuchus

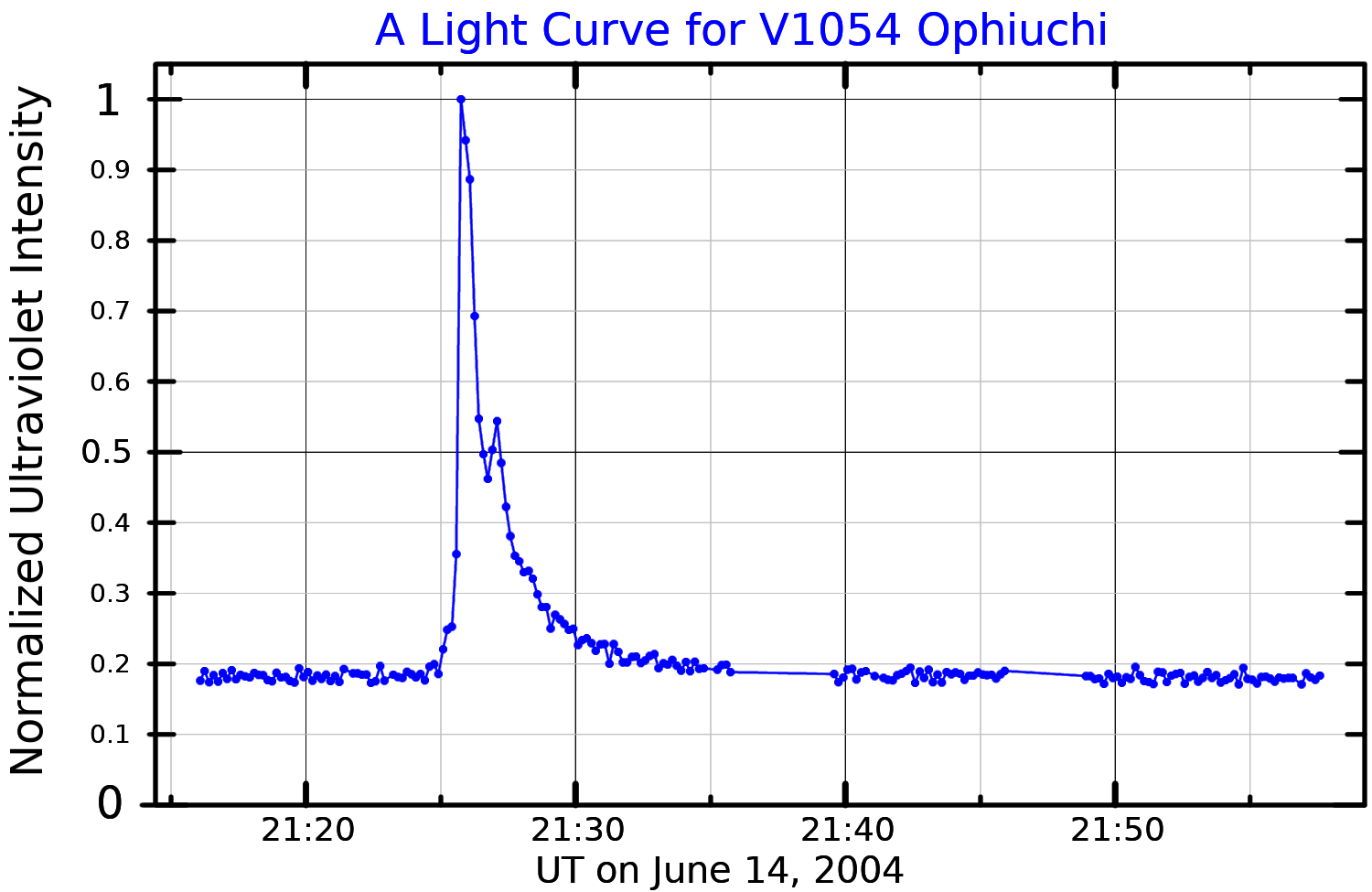
- An ultraviolet band light curve for a flare on V1054 Ophiuchi, plotted from data published by Dal and Evren (2010)

Observation data Epoch J2000 Equinox ICRS
- Constellation: Ophiuchus
- AB
- Right ascension: 16^{h} 55^{m} 28.75757^{s}
- Declination: −08° 20′ 10.7878″
- Apparent magnitude (V): 9.74/10.34/10.84
- Gliese 643
- Right ascension: 16^{h} 55^{m} 25.22225^{s}
- Declination: −08° 19′ 21.2970″
- Apparent magnitude (V): 11.74
- C (VB 8)
- Right ascension: 16^{h} 55^{m} 35.25574^{s}
- Declination: −08° 23′ 40.7531″
- Apparent magnitude (V): 16.80

Characteristics

AB
- Spectral type: M3 V / M4 Ve (Note: Referred to entire V1054 Ophiuchi Bab subsystem.)

Gliese 643
- Spectral type: M3.5 V

C (VB 8)
- Spectral type: M7.0 V

Astrometry

AB
Radial velocity (R_{v})	14.89±0.05 km/s
Proper motion (μ)	RA: −817.84±6.68 mas/yr Dec.: −873.53±3.53 mas/yr
Parallax (π)	161.41±5.64 mas
Distance	20.2 ± 0.7 ly (6.2 ± 0.2 pc)
Absolute magnitude (M_{V})	10.23

Gliese 643
Radial velocity (R_{v})	15.20±0.15 km/s
Proper motion (μ)	RA: −817.580(52) mas/yr Dec.: −898.595(40) mas/yr
Parallax (π)	153.8754±0.0474 mas
Distance	21.196 ± 0.007 ly (6.499 ± 0.002 pc)
Absolute magnitude (M_{V})	12.60

VB 8
Proper motion (μ)	RA: −813.038(63) mas/yr Dec.: −870.609(44) mas/yr
Parallax (π)	153.9659±0.0570 mas
Distance	21.184 ± 0.008 ly (6.495 ± 0.002 pc)
Absolute magnitude (M_{V})	17.75

Orbit
Primary	V1054 Oph A
Name	V1054 Oph B
Period (P)	1.71741±0.00005 yr
Semi-major axis (a)	0.22949±0.00046″
Eccentricity (e)	0.04225±0.00092
Inclination (i)	161.30±0.49°
Longitude of the node (Ω)	164.7±1.6°
Periastron epoch (T)	1991.6311±0.0063
Argument of periastron (ω) (secondary)	128.7±3.3°

Orbit
Primary	V1054 Oph Ba
Name	V1054 Oph Bb
Period (P)	2.965509±0.000006 d
Semi-major axis (a)	0.00687 (Note: From masses, period and parallax.)" (0.04432 AU (Note: From masses and period. According to Mazeh et al. 2001, of order of 0.05 a. u.))
Eccentricity (e)	0.0209±0.0008
Inclination (i)	164.18±0.08°
Periastron epoch (T)	MJD 50919.48±0.03
Argument of periastron (ω) (secondary)	150.0±3.0°

Details

A
Mass	0.4155±0.0057 M_{☉}
Radius	0.533±0.021 R_{☉}
Luminosity	0.02 L_{☉}
Surface gravity (log g)	4.7083 ± 0.0145 cgs
Temperature	3,537±67 K

Ba
Mass	0.3466±0.0047 M_{☉}

Bb
Mass	0.3143±0.0040 M_{☉}

Gliese 643
Mass	0.207±0.010 M_{☉}
Radius	0.282+0.002 −0.005 R_{☉}
Luminosity	0.005303^{+0.000004}_{−0.000005} L_{☉}
Surface gravity (log g)	4.488 ± 0.006 cgs
Temperature	3,028+4 −5 K
Metallicity [Fe/H]	-0.794 ± 0.008 dex

C (VB 8)
Mass	0.0914+0.0026 −0.0025 M_{☉}
Radius	0.1214+0.0060 −0.0057 R_{☉}
Luminosity	0.000645^{+0.000004}_{−0.000005} L_{☉}
Temperature	2,640+65 −64 K
Rotation	11.19±0.02 days

Other designations
- CCDM J16555-0820
- AB: V1054 Oph, BD−08°4352, GJ 644, HD 152751, HIP 82817, SAO 141439, LHS 428, Wolf 630
- GJ 643: GJ 643, HIP 82809, LHS 427, Wolf 629
- C: GJ 644 C, LHS 429, VB 8

Database references
SIMBAD	ABab
- GJ 643
- C (vB 8)

V1054 Ophiuchi, together with the star Gliese 643, is a nearby quintuple star system, located in the constellation Ophiuchus at a distance of 21.2 light-years (6.5 parsecs). It consists of five stars, all of which are red dwarfs. The alternative designation of Wolf 630 forms the namesake of a moving group of stars that share a similar motion through space.

== Overview ==
A
P = 1.72 yr
Ba
P = 2.97 d
Bb
72″ separation
GJ 643
220″ separation
C (VB 8)

Hierarchy of orbits in the system

V1054 Ophiuchi/Gliese 643 is the nearest quintuple star system; the next nearest star systems with at least five stars are Xi Ursae Majoris (quintuple, including a brown dwarf) at 28.5 light-years, Castor (sextuple) at 49.2 light-years, and GJ 2069 (quintuple) at 54.3 light-years. V1054 Ophiuchi and Xi Ursae Majoris are the only two quintuple star systems within 10 parsecs.

The system consists of three widely separated parts:

- close triple subsystem V1054 Ophiuchi A-Bab (including very close binary subsystem V1054 Ophiuchi Bab)
- Gliese 643
- V1054 Ophiuchi C (vB 8)

The brightest and most massive of these five stars is V1054 Ophiuchi A. The close binary subsystem V1054 Ophiuchi B is more massive than V1054 Ophiuchi A, however, its total visual magnitude is 0.1 mag fainter than V1054 Ophiuchi A's visual magnitude.

The total apparent magnitude of the V1054 Ophiuchi A-Bab triple subsystem is 9.02.

Despite V1054 Ophiuchi/Gliese 643 consisting of low-mass stars, the system's total mass, due to the large number of components, exceeds the Solar mass, about 1.35 M_{☉}.

== Distance ==
Currently, the most accurate distance estimate of V1054 Ophiuchi/Gliese 643 is a trigonometric parallax of Gliese 643 from Gaia DR3: 153.8754±0.0474 mas, corresponding to a distance of 6.499±0.002 pc, or 21.196±0.007 ly.

Past V1054 Ophiuchi/Gliese 643 distance estimates

V1054 Ophiuchi A-Bab:

Source	Paper	Parallax, mas	Distance, pc	Distance, ly	Ref.
Woolley	Woolley et al. 1970	156 ± 4	6.41 ± 0.17	20.9 ± 0.6	
GJ, 3rd version	Gliese & Jahreiß 1991	153.9 ± 2.6	6.50 ± 0.11	21.19 ± 0.36	
YPC, 4th edition	van Altena et al. 1995	154.8 ± 0.6	6.460 ± 0.025	21.07 ± 0.08	
Hipparcos	Perryman 1997	174.23 ± 3.90	5.74 ± 0.13	18.7 ± 0.4	
Soederhjelm	Soederhjelm 1999	155.63 ± 1.81	6.43 ± 0.08	20.96 ± 0.25	
Hipparcos2	van Leeuwen 2007	161.41 ± 5.64	6.20 ± 0.22	20.21 ± 0.73	

Gliese 643:

Source	Paper	Parallax, mas	Distance, pc	Distance, ly	Ref.
Woolley	Woolley et al. 1970	169 ± 5	5.92 ± 0.18	19.3 ± 0.6	
GJ, 3rd version	Gliese & Jahreiß 1991	171.9 ± 7.3	5.82 ± 0.26	19.0 ± 0.8	
YPC, 4th edition	van Altena et al. 1995	169.8 ± 6.6	5.89 ± 0.24	19.2 ± 0.8	
Hipparcos	Perryman 1997	153.96 ± 4.04	6.50 ± 0.18	21.2 ± 0.6	
Hipparcos2	van Leeuwen 2007	148.92 ± 4.00	6.72 ± 0.19	21.9 ± 0.6	

V1054 Ophiuchi C (vB 8):

Source	Paper	Parallax, mas	Distance, pc	Distance, ly	Ref.
CTIOPI 1.5 m	TSN 14 (Costa et al. 2005)	155.43 ± 1.33	6.43 ± 0.06	20.98 ± 0.18	

=== Weighted mean distance ===
A weighted mean parallax was calculated by RECONS in 2012, considering YPC (V1054 Ophiuchi A-Bab and Gliese 643), Hipparcos (Soederhjelm — V1054 Ophiuchi A-Bab and van Leeuwen — Gliese 643) and CTIOPI (V1054 Ophiuchi C) data. The value is 154.96±0.52 mas, corresponding to a distance of 6.453±0.022 pc, or 21.05±0.07 ly. This predates Gaia astrometry of the system.

== System ==
=== V1054 Ophiuchi A-Bab (inner triple subsystem) ===
V1054 Ophiuchi A-Bab is a close spectroscopic triple subsystem, consisting of the brighter component V1054 Ophiuchi A and the more massive binary subsystem V1054 Ophiuchi Bab, orbiting each other with a period of 627 days, or 1.72 years. V1054 Ophiuchi Bab components are orbiting each other with a period of 2.9655 days. Both outer and inner orbits are nearly circular and, probably, coplanar (in keeping with a general tendency of close triple systems).

V1054 Ophiuchi A-Bab pair is also visually resolved (for nearly 50 years it was the shortest-period resolved by visual means binary, since its binarity was discovered by G. P. Kuiper in 1934), whereas V1054 Ophiuchi Ba-Bb pair is still unresolved). (Note: At least it was not resolved by 2001.)

=== Gliese 643 ===
The projected separation of Gliese 643 from V1054 Ophiuchi A-Bab is 72 arcsec, corresponding at 21.05 light-years to 465 AU.

=== V1054 Ophiuchi C (vB 8) ===
vB 8 is the smallest, faintest, and most separated component of the V1054 Ophiuchi system. The projected separation of the red dwarf from the primary triple system is about 220 arcsec, corresponding at 21.05 light-years to 1420 a.u. Since it is only three times larger than the projected separation between Gliese 643 and V1054 Ophiuchi A-Bab, and such a small ratio should render the triple system dynamically unstable, it was suggested that the real separation of V1054 Ophiuchi C from V1054 Ophiuchi A-Bab is much larger, at least by a factor of two, i. e. at least 2840 a.u.

In 1984, the apparent detection of an infrared source near vB 8 suggested it had a low mass companion. The low mass of this candidate led to speculation that it may be a brown dwarf; the first such to be detected. This discovery was later found to be spurious, but it produced much interest in this class of astronomical object.
