= QS Virginis =

Eclipsing binary star in the constellation Virgo

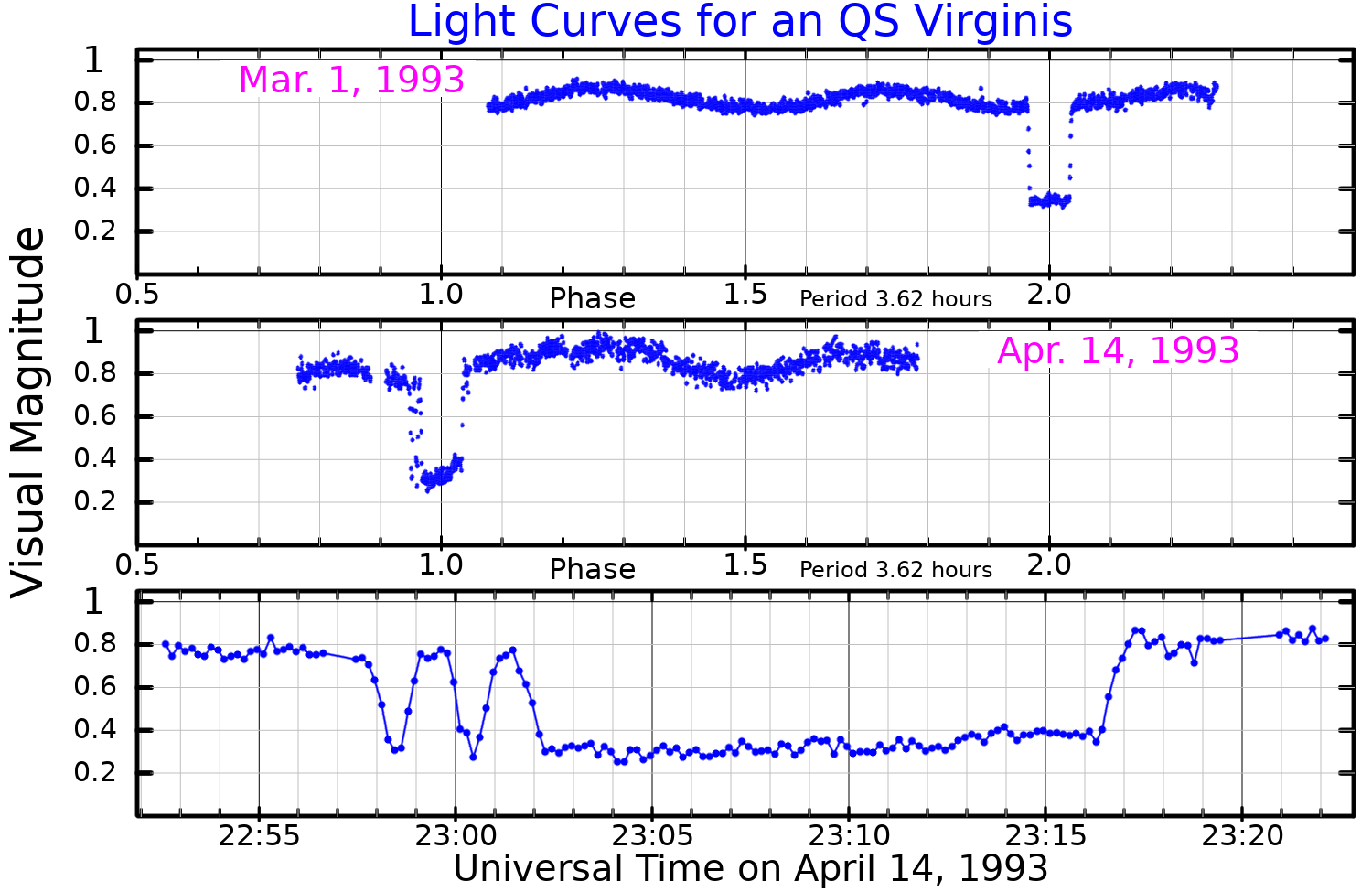
- Visual band light curves for QS Virginis, adapted from O’Donoghue et al. (2003). The lowest plot shows two pre-eclipse dips.

Observation data Epoch J2000 Equinox ICRS
- Constellation: Virgo
- Right ascension: 13^{h} 49^{m} 52.0032^{s}
- Declination: −13° 13′ 37.002″
- Apparent magnitude (V): +14.8

Characteristics
- Spectral type: DAm / M3.5V

Astrometry
| Proper motion (μ) | RA: 41.618±0.108 mas/yr Dec.: 17.984±0.097 mas/yr |
| Parallax (π) | 19.9632±0.0584 mas |
| Distance | 163.4 ± 0.5 ly (50.1 ± 0.1 pc) |
| Absolute magnitude (M_{V}) | 11.74 + 11.82 |

Orbit
| Period (P) | 217.092 min |
| Semi-major axis (a) | 0.0056 AU |
| Eccentricity (e) | 0.0 |
| Inclination (i) | 60° |

Details

White dwarf
| Mass | 0.78 M_{☉} |
| Radius | 0.011 R_{☉} |
| Luminosity | 0.0044 L_{☉} |
| Surface gravity (log g) | 8.34 cgs |
| Temperature | 14,200 K |
| Rotational velocity (v sin i) | 400 km/s |

Red dwarf
| Mass | 0.43 M_{☉} |
| Radius | 0.42 R_{☉} |
| Luminosity | 0.015 L_{☉} |
| Temperature | 3,100 K |
| Rotational velocity (v sin i) | 140 km/s |

Other designations
- GSC 05559-00143, 1RXS J134951.0-131338, WD 1347-129, EC 13471-1258, SBC9 1944

Database references
| SIMBAD | data |

QS Virginis (abbreviated QS Vir) is an eclipsing binary system approximately 163 light-years away from the Sun, forming a cataclysmic variable. The system comprises an eclipsing white dwarf and red dwarf that orbit each other every 3.62 hours.

== Variability ==
The eclipsing binary nature of QS Virginis was discovered in 1997 during the Edinburgh-Cape Blue Object Survey for blue stellar objects in the southern hemisphere.

== Possible third body ==
In 2009 the discovery of an extrasolar planet in orbit around the binary star was announced, detected by variations in the timings of the eclipses of the two stars. The planet was announced to have a minimum mass 6.4 times the mass of Jupiter, in an elliptical orbit 4.2 Astronomical Units away from binary.

Subsequent observations revealed that the timings were not following the pattern predicted by the planetary model. While the observed variations in eclipse times may be caused by a third body, the best fit model orbit is for an object with minimum mass 0.05 solar masses (about 50 times the mass of Jupiter) in a highly eccentric 14-year orbit, making it a brown dwarf instead.

== See also ==
- Algol
- HW Virginis
- NN Serpentis
- CM Draconis
- DP Leonis
- NSVS 14256825
- List of extrasolar planets
