= GJ 2069 =

Star system in the constellation Cancer

Observation data Epoch J2000 Equinox ICRS
- Constellation: Cancer
- A
- Right ascension: 08^{h} 31^{m} 37.57418^{s}
- Declination: +19° 23′ 39.3980″
- Apparent magnitude (V): 11.81
- B
- Right ascension: 08^{h} 31^{m} 37.42279^{s}
- Declination: +19° 23′ 49.2821″
- Apparent magnitude (V): 14.83

Characteristics

A
- Evolutionary stage: main sequence
- Spectral type: M3.5Ve + M3.5Ve
- Variable type: UV Cet+EB

B
- Evolutionary stage: main sequence
- Spectral type: M4.0Ve
- Variable type: UV Cet

Astrometry

A
Proper motion (μ)	RA: −228.694 mas/yr Dec.: −119.919 mas/yr
Parallax (π)	60.0602±0.0356 mas
Distance	54.30 ± 0.03 ly (16.650 ± 0.010 pc)
Absolute magnitude (M_{V})	11.95 + 12.31

B
Radial velocity (R_{v})	7.83±1.21 km/s
Proper motion (μ)	RA: −232.878 mas/yr Dec.: −128.911 mas/yr
Parallax (π)	60.2485±0.0764 mas
Distance	54.14 ± 0.07 ly (16.60 ± 0.02 pc)

C
Proper motion (μ)	RA: −207.443 mas/yr Dec.: −125.513 mas/yr
Parallax (π)	60.6896±0.1458 mas
Distance	53.7 ± 0.1 ly (16.48 ± 0.04 pc)

Orbit
Primary	Aa
Secondary	Ab
Period (P)	2.77146871(34) d
Inclination (i)	86.34±0.03°

Details

Aa
Mass	0.4358±0.0008 M_{☉}
Radius	0.4122±0.0015 R_{☉}
Luminosity	0.0167 L_{☉}
Surface gravity (log g)	4.804±0.011 cgs
Temperature	3160±150 K

Ab
Mass	0.3998±0.0014 M_{☉}
Radius	0.3817±0.0024 R_{☉}
Luminosity	0.0131 L_{☉}
Surface gravity (log g)	4.854±0.021 cgs
Temperature	3125±150 K

Other designations
- GJ 2069, CCDM J08316+1924AB
- A: CU Cnc, HIP 41824, L 1251-12, LP 425-72, LTT 12221, NLTT 19685
- B: CV Cnc, L 1251-13, LP 425-7, LTT 12222, NLTT 19684

Database references
SIMBAD	A
- BC
- B
- C
ARICNS	A
- B

GJ 2069 is a quintuple star system located 54 light-years (17 parsecs) away in the constellation Cancer. It appears near the Beehive Cluster in the sky, but it is closer than the cluster and is not a member of it. The system is composed of two sub-systems, GJ 2069 A & B, also known by their variable star designations CU Cancri and CV Cancri; both are binary, and GJ 2069 A has a third companion star, making five stars in total. All five stars are red dwarfs.

According to a 2003 study, the system is likely a member of the Castor Moving Group, with an age of 320 million years, but a 2024 study of the stellar magnetic fields found that the system is likely at least 1 billion years old.

== System ==
GJ 2069 Aa (CU Cnc A)
Period = 2.8 d
GJ 2069 Ab (CU Cnc B)
0.68″ separation
GJ 2069 D
12″ separation
GJ 2069 B (CV Cnc A)
0.36″ separation
GJ 2069 C (CV Cnc B)

Hierarchy of orbits in the GJ 2069 system

GJ 2069 A & B are separated by 12 arcseconds. Both are flare stars.

=== GJ 2069 A (CU Cancri) ===
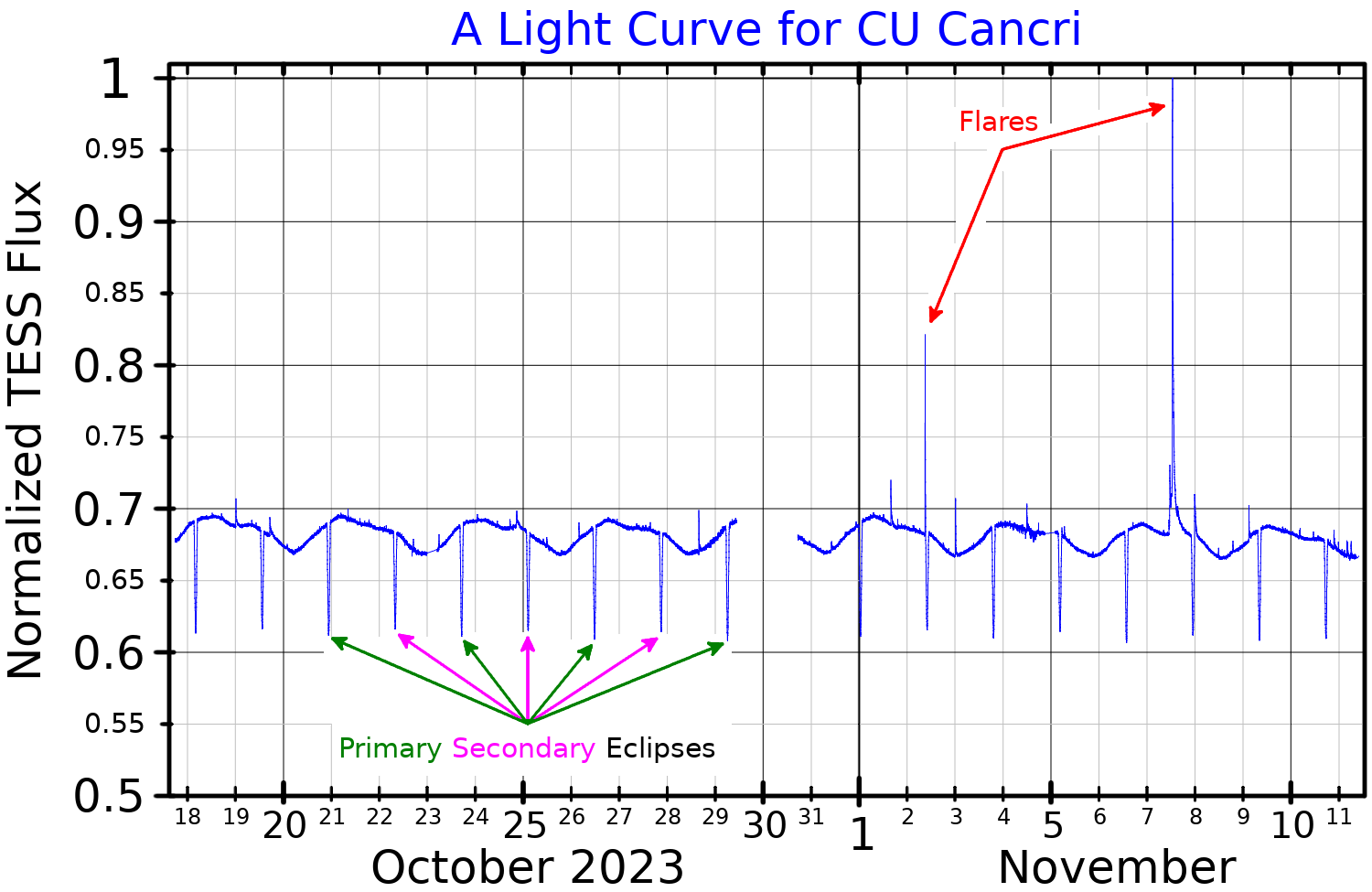
A light curve for CU Cancri, plotted from TESS data

GJ 2069 A, also known as CU Cancri, is a close eclipsing binary orbiting every 2.8 days. Both stars are red dwarfs around 40% the mass of the Sun. It was found to be a binary in 1999, and was the third known M-dwarf eclipsing binary, after CM Draconis and YY Geminorum (Castor C). The stars appear fainter than other stars of the same mass, likely due to high starspot coverage.

GJ 2069 A also has a third companion star at a separation of 0.68 arcseconds, designated GJ 2069 D. It was found in 2001.

=== GJ 2069 B (CV Cancri) ===
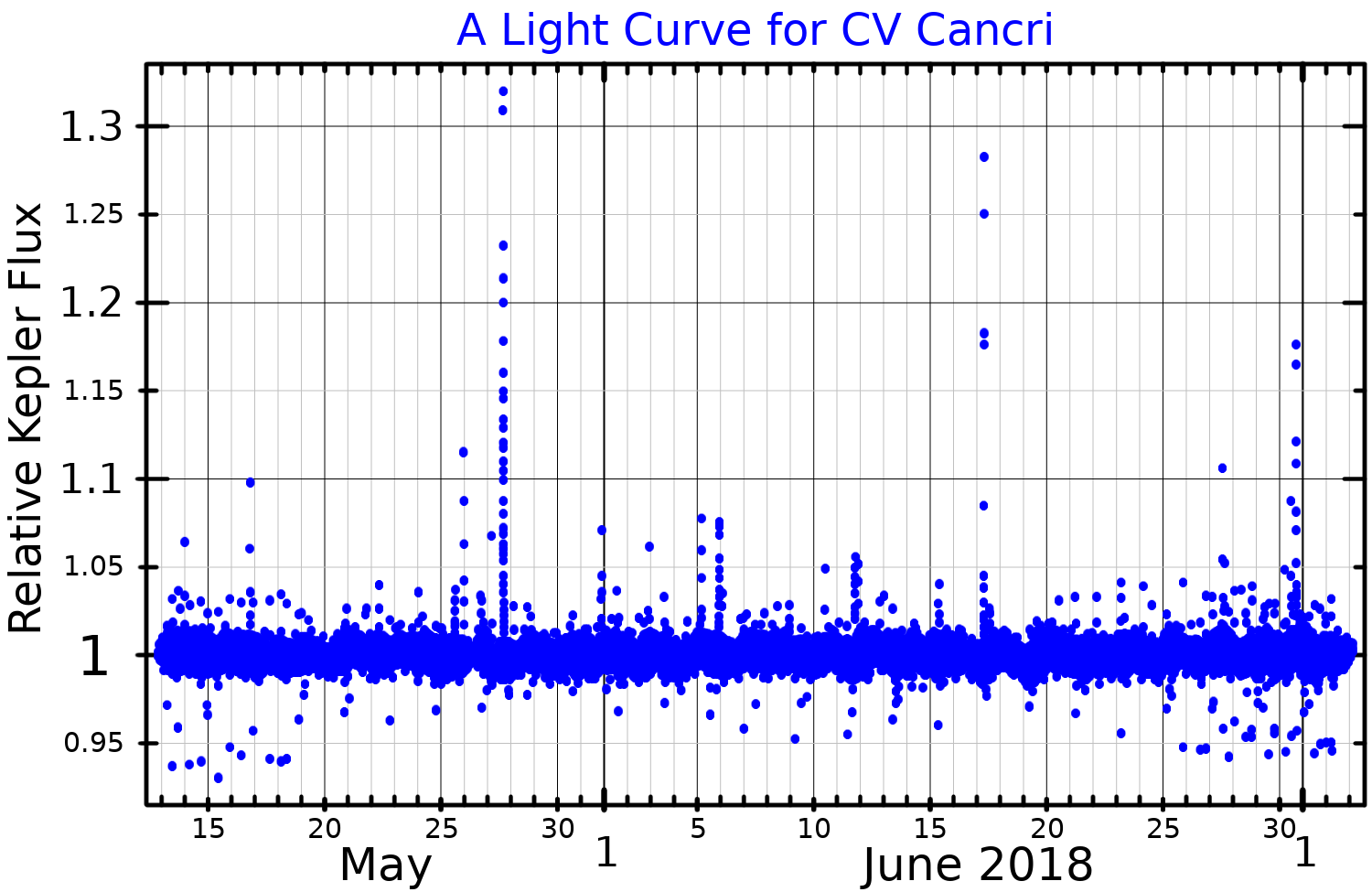
A light curve for CV Cancri showing Kepler data, adapted from Raetz et al. (2020)

GJ 2069 B, also known as CV Cancri, is a binary pair of red dwarfs, separated by 0.36 arcseconds. The companion star is also called GJ 2069 C. It was resolved as a binary in 1999.

== See also ==
- V1054 Ophiuchi
