= Polar (star) =

Highly magnetic type of cataclysmic variable binary star system

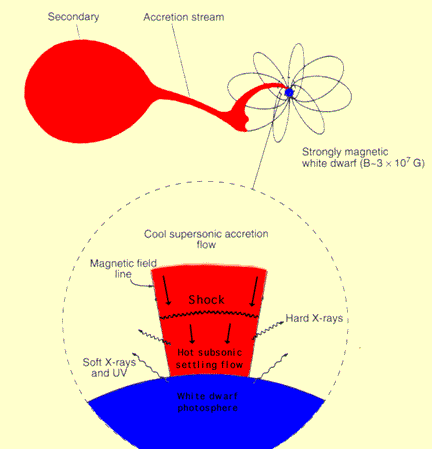
Polar variables are magnetic white dwarfs accreting material from a low mass donor, with no accretion disk due to the intense magnetic field

In astronomy, a polar is a highly magnetic type of cataclysmic variable (CV) binary star system, originally known as an AM Herculis star after the prototype member AM Herculis. Like other CVs, polars contain two stars: an accreting white dwarf (WD), and a low-mass donor star (usually a red dwarf) which is transferring mass to the WD as a result of the WD's gravitational pull, overflowing its Roche lobe. Polars are distinguished from other CVs by the presence of a very strong magnetic field in the WD. Typical magnetic field strengths of polar systems are 10 million to 80 million gauss (1000–8000 teslas). The WD in the polar AN Ursae Majoris has the strongest known magnetic field among cataclysmic variables, with a field strength of 230 million gauss (23 kT).

== Accretion mechanism ==
One of the most critical consequences of the WD's magnetism is that it synchronizes the rotational period of the WD with the orbital period of the binary; to first order, this means that the same side of the WD always faces the donor star. This synchronous rotation is considered a defining feature of polars. Additionally, the WD's magnetic field captures the accretion stream from the donor star before it can develop into an accretion disk. The capture of the accretion stream is known as threading, and it occurs when the magnetic pressure from the WD matches the stream's ram pressure. The captured material flows along the WD's magnetic field lines until it violently accretes onto the WD in a shock near one or more of the star's magnetic poles. This accretion region covers only a fraction of the WD's surface, but it can contribute half of the system's optical light. In addition to optical and near-infrared cyclotron radiation, the accretion region also produces X-rays due to the high temperature of gas within the shock, so polars are frequently brighter in X-rays than non-magnetic CVs.

Whereas accretion in a non-magnetic system is governed by viscosity within the accretion disk, accretion in a polar is entirely magnetic. Additionally, while an accretion disk can be crudely envisioned as a two-dimensional structure with no significant thickness, the accretion flow in a polar has complex three-dimensional structure because the magnetic field lines lift it out of the orbital plane. Indeed, in some polars, the vertical extent of the accretion flow enables it to regularly pass in front of the WD's accretion spot as seen from Earth, causing a temporary decrease in the system's observed brightness.

Polars derive their name from the linearly and circularly polarized light that they produce. Information about the accretion geometry of a polar can be found by studying its polarization.

== Asynchronous polars ==
The 1:1 ratio of the WD rotational period and the binary orbital period is a fundamental property of polars, but in four polars (V1500 Cyg, BY Cam, V1432 Aql, and CD Ind), these two periods are different by ~1% or less. The most common explanation for the WD's asynchronous rotation is that each of these systems had been synchronous until a nova eruption broke the synchronization by changing the WD's rotation period. The first known asynchronous polar, V1500 Cyg, underwent a nova in 1975, and its asynchronous rotation was discovered after the nova faded, providing the best observational evidence of this scenario. In V1500 Cyg, BY Cam, and V1432 Aql, there is observational evidence that the WD is resynchronizing its spin period with the orbital period, and these systems are expected to become synchronous on a timescale of centuries.

Due to the slight difference between the orbital and WD rotation periods, the WD and its magnetosphere slowly rotate as seen from the donor star. Critically, this asynchronous rotation causes the accretion stream to interact with different magnetic field lines. Since the accretion flow travels along the field lines which have captured it, it will follow different trajectories when it interacts with different field lines. As a concrete example, the accretion flow in the eclipsing polar V1432 Aql sometimes threads onto field lines which carry it so far above the orbital plane that the flow is not obscured when the donor star eclipses the WD, but at other times, it threads onto field lines with less vertical extent, causing the accretion flow to be much more fully eclipsed. The corresponding variations in eclipse depth were shown to depend very strongly on the orientation of the WD's magnetic field with respect to the donor star. For comparison, in a synchronous polar, the WD does not rotate with respect to the donor star, and the stream always interacts with the same field lines, resulting in a stable accretion geometry.

There is also evidence in each of the four asynchronous polars that the accretion stream is able to travel much deeper into the WD's magnetosphere than in synchronous systems, implying an unusually high rate of mass transfer from the donor star or a low magnetic field strength, but this has not been studied in detail.

== Intermediate polars ==
Another class of cataclysmic variables with magnetic white dwarfs accreting material from a main sequence donor star are the intermediate polars. These have less strong magnetic fields and the rotation of the white dwarf is not synchronised with the orbital period. It has been proposed that intermediate polars may evolve into polars as the donor is depleted and the orbit shrinks.

== Low-Accretion-Rate polars ==
Also called pre-polars, this class of pre-cataclysmic variables also contain a magnetic white dwarf, but the method of accretion from the main sequence secondary star is different. For these systems, the accretion rate is very low, and is supplied by the stellar wind of the secondary star, instead of Roche overflow.
