= PSR B0943+10 =

Pulsar in the constellation of Leo

Observation data Epoch J2000.0 Equinox ICRS
- Constellation: Leo
- Right ascension: 09^{h} 46^{m} 7.31^{s}
- Declination: +09° 51′ 57.3″

Astrometry
Distance	2,000 ly (630 ± 100 pc)

Characteristics
- Spectral type: Pulsar

Details
Mass	1.5 M_{☉}
Luminosity	1.31×10^{−5} L_{☉}
Temperature	3.1×10^{6} (Note: Blackbody temperature of a small emitting area at the poles) K
Rotation	1.09770570486 s
Age	5 (Note: Characteristic age) Myr

Database references
SIMBAD	data

PSR B0943+10 is a pulsar 2,000 light years from Earth in the direction of the constellation of Leo. It was discovered at Pushchino in December 1968, becoming the first pulsar discovered by Soviet astronomers. The original designation of this pulsar was PP 0943.

== Characteristics ==
The pulsar is estimated to be 5 million years old, which is relatively old for a pulsar. It has a rotational period of 1.0977 seconds and emits both radio waves and X-rays. Ongoing research at the University of Vermont discovered that the pulsar was found to flip roughly every few hours between a radio bright mode with highly organized pulsations and a quieter mode with rather chaotic temporal structure.

Moreover, the observations of the pulsar performed simultaneously with the European Space Agency's XMM-Newton X-ray observatory and ground-based radio telescopes revealed that it exhibits variations in its X-ray emission that mimic in reverse the changes seen in radio waves – the pulsar has a weaker non-pulsing X-ray luminosity during the radio bright mode and is actually brighter during the radio quiet mode emitting distinct X-ray pulses. Such changes can only be explained if the pulsar's magnetosphere (which may extend up to 52,000 km (32,000 mi) from the surface) quickly switches between two extreme states. The change happens on a few seconds timescale, far faster than most pulsars. Despite being one of the first pulsars discovered, the mechanism for its unusual behavior is unknown.

In 2006, a research group from Peking University published a paper suggesting that the pulsar may actually be a low-mass quark star with mass around 0.02 M_{☉}.

== Claimed planetary system ==
In May 2014, the detection of periodic timing variations was reported that could be explained by two gas giant planets orbiting PSR B0943+10. A more recent analysis from 2019 found instead a single, five-Earth mass planet with an orbital period of 12 years.

However, all proposed planets were found to be doubtful in a 2025 publication, which suggest the observed variations are due to magnetospheric phenomena and spin-down oscillations. The planets reported in 2014 are classified as "deprecated", while the planet reported in 2019 is a "questionable candidate".

== See also ==
- PSR B0329+54
- Pulsar planet
