= OY Carinae =

Binary star in the constellation Carina

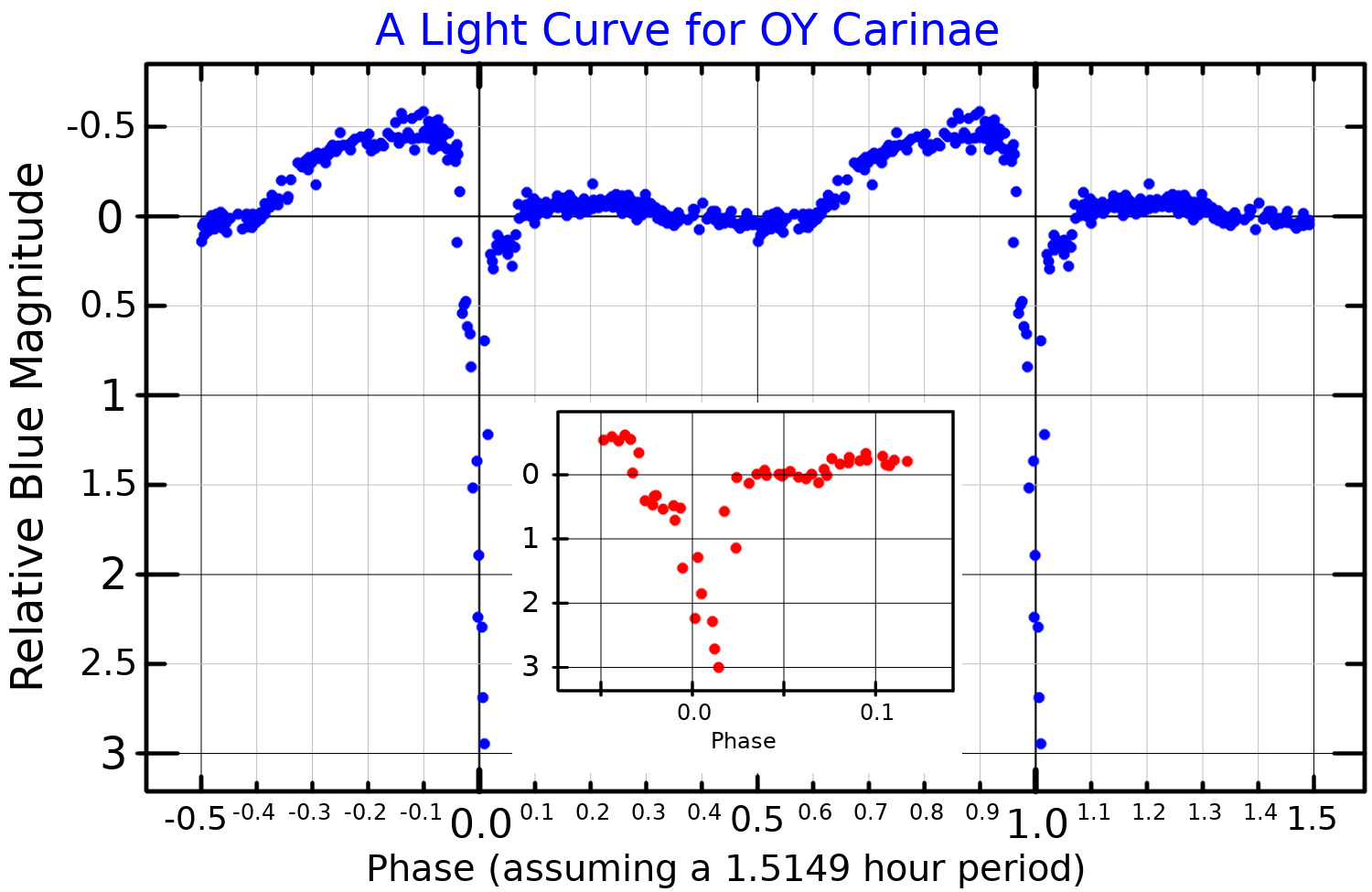
- A blue band light curve for OY Carinae, adapted from Khruzina1 et al. (2003). The main plot shows the full light curve, and the inset shows the minimum with an expanded horizontal scale.

Observation data Epoch J2000 Equinox ICRS
- Constellation: Carina
- Right ascension: 10^{h} 06^{m} 22.079^{s}
- Declination: −70° 14′ 04.58″
- Apparent magnitude (V): Max: 11.9; Min: 18.2

Characteristics
- Spectral type: DA + M8–9V
- Variable type: SU UMa+Algol

Astrometry
Radial velocity (R_{v})	120 km/s
Proper motion (μ)	RA: −38.830 mas/yr Dec.: +7.286 mas/yr
Parallax (π)	11.039±0.0254 mas
Distance	295.5 ± 0.7 ly (90.6 ± 0.2 pc)

Orbit
Period (P)	0.06312092545(24) days
Semi-major axis (a)	0.662±0.003 R_{☉}
Inclination (i)	83.27+0.10 −0.13°
Semi-amplitude (K_{1}) (primary)	50.4±0.9 km/s
Semi-amplitude (K_{2}) (secondary)	475.9±2.1 km/s

Details

Primary
Mass	0.882±0.015 M_{☉}
Radius	0.00957+0.00018 −0.00012 R_{☉}
Luminosity	0.0055 L_{☉}
Surface gravity (log g)	8.422+0.017 −0.013 cgs
Temperature	18,600+2,800 −1,600 K

Secondary
Mass	0.093+0.004 −0.001 M_{☉}
Radius	0.1388+0.0018 −0.0003 R_{☉}
Luminosity	0.00117 L_{☉}
Temperature	3,000 K
Rotational velocity (v sin i)	108±6 km/s

Other designations
- AAVSO 1004-69, 2MASS J10062206−7014045

Database references
SIMBAD	data

OY Carinae is an eclipsing binary star system in the southern constellation of Carina, abbreviated OY Car. It is located at a distance of approximately 296 light-years (90.7 parsecs) from the Sun, and is classed as a cataclysmic variable. The system comprises a double eclipsing white dwarf and red dwarf that orbit each other every 1.51 hours, and possibly a yet unconfirmed third low-mass (substellar?) companion.

== Observations ==
Cuno Hoffmeister discovered that the star is a cataclysmic variable, in 1959. In 1976, it was identified as a candidate SU Ursae Majoris (SU UMa)-type variable. It was found to be a double eclipsing binary system by Nikolaus Vogt in 1979, who determined a period of 91 minutes. This behavior potentially allows for precise determination of the physical parameters of the system. Superhumps during an outburst of OY Car were reported in 1980, confirming its status as an SU UMa variable.

The standard model for this type of system has a cool star orbiting a compact white dwarf. The cool star is filling its Roche lobe and is feeding matter to an accretion disk orbiting the white dwarf. The eclipsing of the accretion disk allows its dimensions to be estimated. The impact point of the material contacting the accretion disk produces a "hot spot", which is responsible for the superhump feature in the light curve.

By 1991, superoutbursts of OY Car were found to occur on an almost annual cycle, with a mean time interval of 346.5 days. However, individual cycles could range from 354 to 472 days. The mean maximum magnitude was 11.45, with the system being above magnitude 13 for an average of 12 days. These superoutbursts are thought to occur during periods of rapid accretion onto the white dwarf, which in SU UMa systems can be triggered by tidal resonances in the disk. During a superoutburst, the temperature of the white dwarf can increase to 19,700 K before steadily declining.

As material accretes onto the white dwarf it undergoes decelaration and emits X-rays. However, the high inclination of the system means that this emission is obscured by the disk. Most of the X-ray emission from OY Car appear to come from the polar regions. This suggests the accretion is magnetically directed onto the pole of an inclined dipolar field.

== Planetary system? ==
Greenhill et al. (2009) would invoke the presence of a third object to explain orbital period variations with an apparent periodicity of roughly 35 years. The third body could yield a minimum mass 7 times greater than Jupiter and be located 9.5 astronomical units away from the cataclysmic variable system, being likely either a massive planetary object or else a very low-mass brown dwarf.

It is likely that the apparent change is due to solar cycle type magnetic activity in the secondary star. Large irregular deviations from the general trend, with time-scales of years also occur. Further observations will be able to confirm or disprove the presence of a substellar companion.

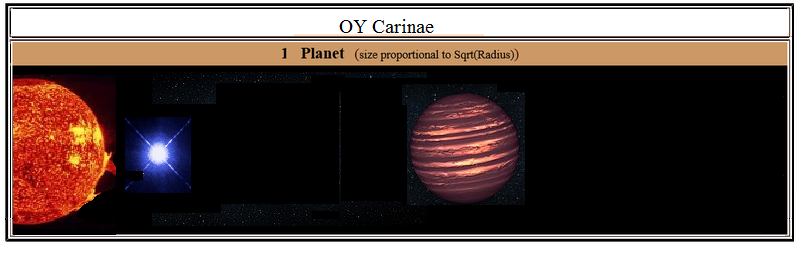
Diagram of the probable structure of the OY Carinae Star System.

The OY Carinae planetary system
Companion (in order from star)	Mass	Semimajor axis (AU)	Orbital period (years)	Eccentricity	Inclination (°)	Radius
b (unconfirmed)	≥7 M_{J}	9.5	35±3.5	—	—	—

== See also ==
- VW Hydri – a dwarf nova displaying similar oscillations
- Z Chamaeleontis – a similar system
