= AM Herculis =

Star in the constellation Hercules

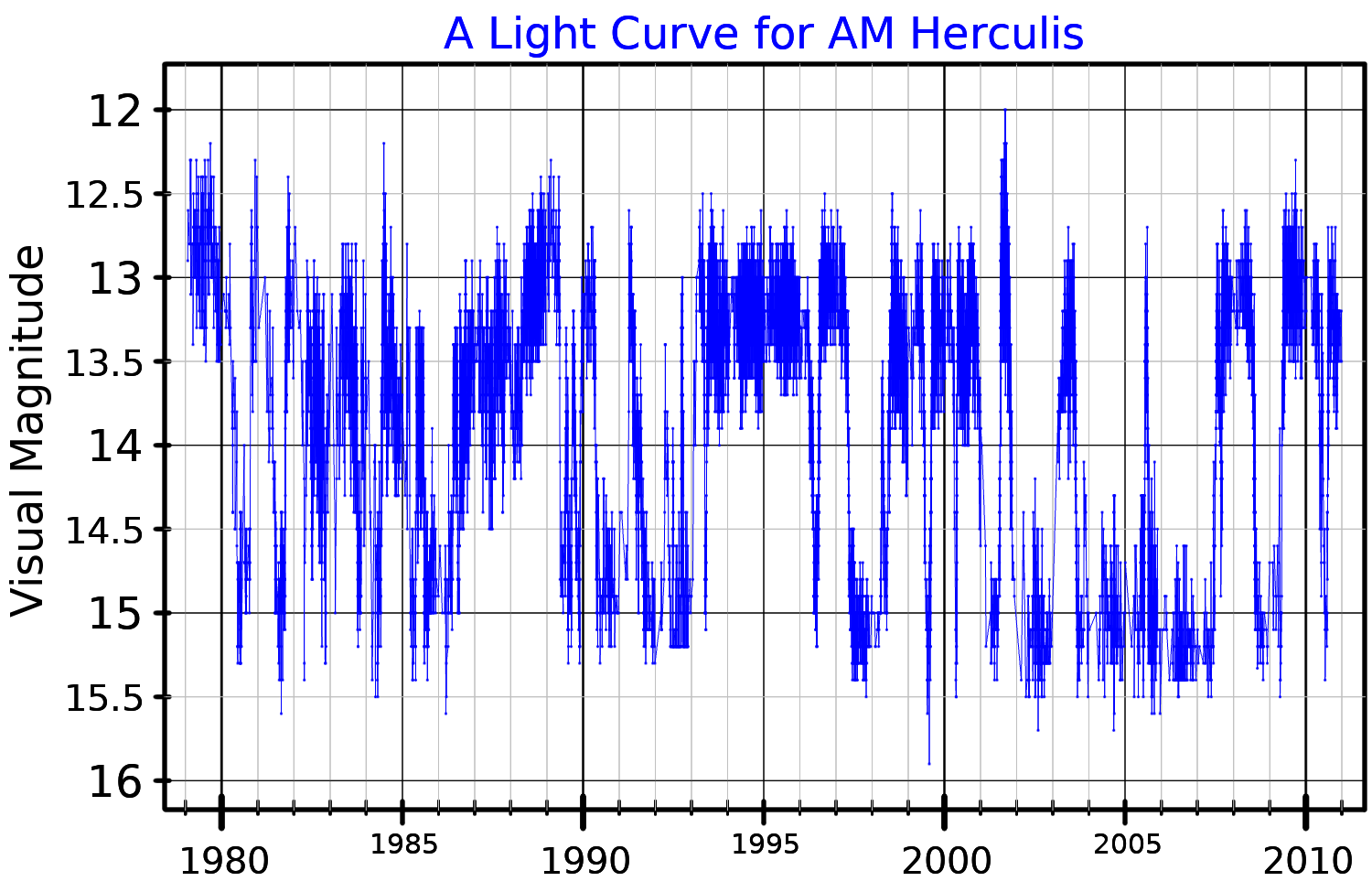
- A visual band light curve for AM Herculis, from AAVSO data

Observation data Epoch J2000.0 Equinox ICRS
- Constellation: Hercules
- Right ascension: 18^{h} 16^{m} 13.255^{s}
- Declination: +49° 52′ 04.76″
- Apparent magnitude (V): 12.30-15.7

Characteristics
- Spectral type: pec + M4.5V
- Variable type: AM/XRM+E

Astrometry
Radial velocity (R_{v})	-19.0 km/s
Proper motion (μ)	RA: −45.957 mas/yr Dec.: +28.046 mas/yr
Parallax (π)	11.3953±0.0179 mas
Distance	286.2 ± 0.4 ly (87.8 ± 0.1 pc)

Orbit
Period (P)	3.094 hours (variable)
Eccentricity (e)	0.47±0.21
Inclination (i)	50°

Details

White dwarf
Mass	0.6 - 0.7 M_{☉}

Red dwarf
Mass	0.26 M_{☉}
Radius	0.32 R_{☉}

Other designations
- AN 1923.0028, GSC 3533.01105, X 18149+498

Database references
SIMBAD	data

AM Herculis is a binary variable star located in the constellation Hercules. This star, along with the star AN Ursae Majoris, is the prototype for a category of cataclysmic variable stars called polars, or AM Her type stars.

== History ==
AM Herculis was first cataloged in 1923 by Max Wolf and was listed at the time as Veränderlicher 28.1923, which is now AN 28.1923 in the General Catalogue of Variable Stars. It was observed to be an irregular variable star ranging from 12 to 14 in apparent magnitude. In 1976, the astronomer S. Tapia discovered that light from the star is both linearly and circularly polarized, showing that there was a strong magnetic field surrounding the system and revealing that the system was more complex than previously thought.

== System ==
The AM Herculis binary system contains a white dwarf and a red dwarf. The white dwarf is accreting material directly from the red dwarf without an accretion disk. The white dwarf primary is highly magnetic and the infalling material is channelled towards the magnetic poles. The accretion rate is unstable, at times decreasing dramatically and reducing the brightness of the whole system. There are also periodic variations thought to be caused by the appearance and eclipse of the accreting regions during rotation of the white dwarf.

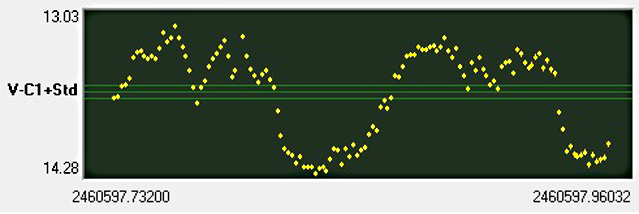
Light curve of AM Her showing decrease in luminocity at top of curve, probably caused by WD eclipsing its own accreating region.
