= HW Virginis =

Eclipsing binary star in the constellation Virgo

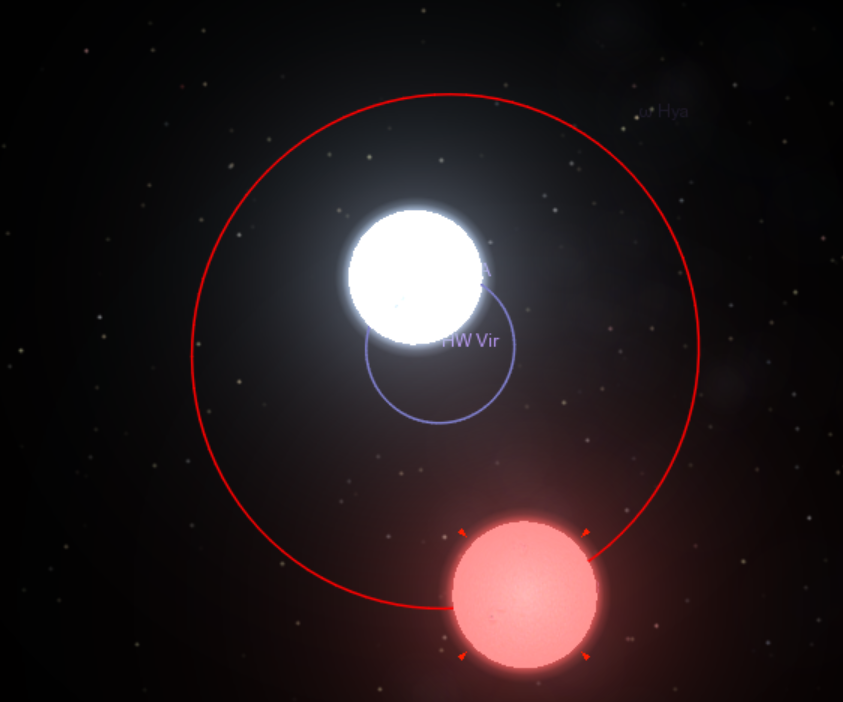
- The HW Virginis system in Celestia.

Observation data Epoch J2000 Equinox ICRS
- Constellation: Virgo
- Right ascension: 12^{h} 44^{m} 20.2387^{s}
- Declination: −08° 40′ 16.849″
- Apparent magnitude (V): 10.69

Characteristics
- Spectral type: sdB / dM
- Variable type: eclipsing binary

Astrometry
Proper motion (μ)	RA: 8.969±0.175 mas/yr Dec.: −15.677±0.107 mas/yr
Parallax (π)	5.7972±0.0849 mas
Distance	563 ± 8 ly (172 ± 3 pc)
Absolute magnitude (M_{V})	4.22 (sdB) + 15.59 (dM)
Absolute bolometric magnitude (M_{bol})	1.46 (sdB) + 11.20 (dM)

Orbit
Period (P)	0.11671967 d
Semi-major axis (a)	0.860 ± 0.010 R_{☉}
Eccentricity (e)	<0.0003
Inclination (i)	80.98 ± 0.10°

Details

sdB
Mass	0.485 ± 0.013 M_{☉}
Radius	0.183 ± 0.026 R_{☉}
Luminosity	19.7 ± 5.6 L_{☉}
Temperature	28488 ± 208 K

dM
Mass	0.142 ± 0.004 M_{☉}
Radius	0.175 ± 0.026 R_{☉}
Luminosity	0.003 ± 0.001 L_{☉}
Temperature	3084 ± 889 K

Other designations
- BD−07 3477, HIP 62157, 2MASS J12442024-0840168

Database references
SIMBAD	data

HW Virginis, abbreviated HW Vir, is an eclipsing binary system (of the Algol type), approximately 563 light-years away based on the parallax measured by the Gaia spacecraft, in the constellation of Virgo. The system comprises an eclipsing B-type subdwarf star and red dwarf star. The two stars orbit each other every 0.116795 days.

John William Menzies and Freddy Marang announced their discovery of the eclipsing binary nature of this star in 1985.

== Eclipse timing variations ==
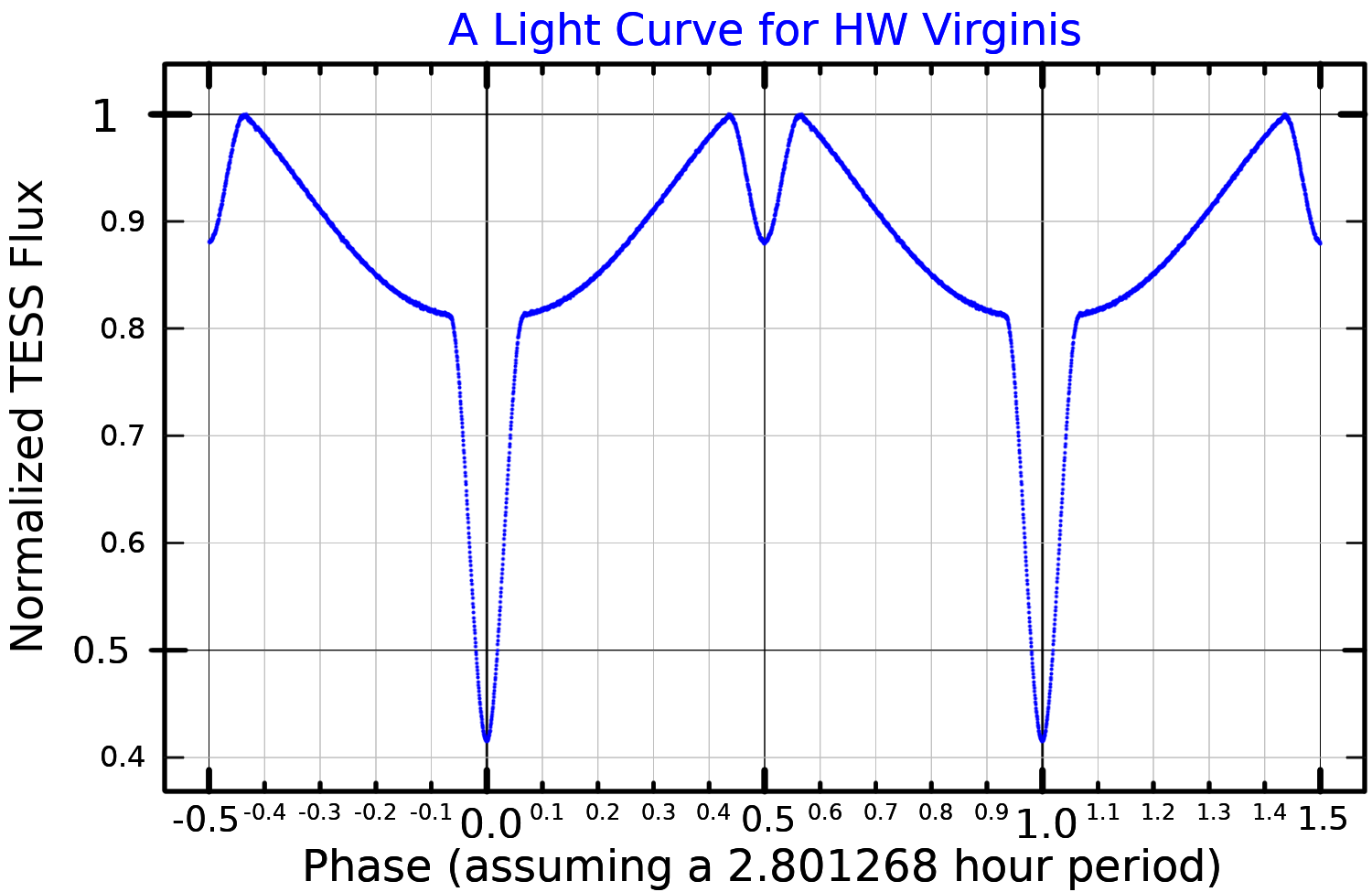
A light curve for HW Virginis, plotted from TESS data

Based on variations in the timing of the system's eclipses, in 2008 it was claimed that two giant planets were in orbit around the binary, with masses of 8.47 and 19.2 times the mass of Jupiter orbiting with periods of 9.1 and 15.8 years respectively. The proposed system was later shown to be extremely unstable, with mean lifetimes less than 1000 years in the parameter space allowed by the uncertainties in the data. An alternate, dynamically-stable orbital solution was proposed with a 14.3 Jupiter mass object on a 12-year orbit and an outer companion of 65 Jupiter masses on a 55-year orbit, however it has been noted that the outer companion's orbital parameters are highly unconstrained, again casting doubt on the reality of this model. The problems with modelling this system and the proposed planets orbiting several other post-common envelope binaries has led to the suggestion that the eclipse timing variations used to infer the existence of planets has a non-planetary origin. The eclipse timing variations of HW Virginis were shown to be incompatible with all previous planetary system models as of 2018, and again in 2021. However, eclipse timing variations cannot be explained by known stellar mechanisms either. There is tentative evidence for the presence of a planet from astrometric measurements, with future data releases of the Gaia spacecraft being predicted to be able to fully confirm this.

== See also ==
- Algol – Eclipsing variable star in the constellation Perseus
- CM Draconis – Star in the constellation Draco
- QS Virginis – Eclipsing binary star in the constellation Virgo
- NN Serpentis – Eclipsing post-common envelope binary star system in the constellation Serpens
- List of extrasolar planets
