= CM Draconis =

Star in the constellation Draco

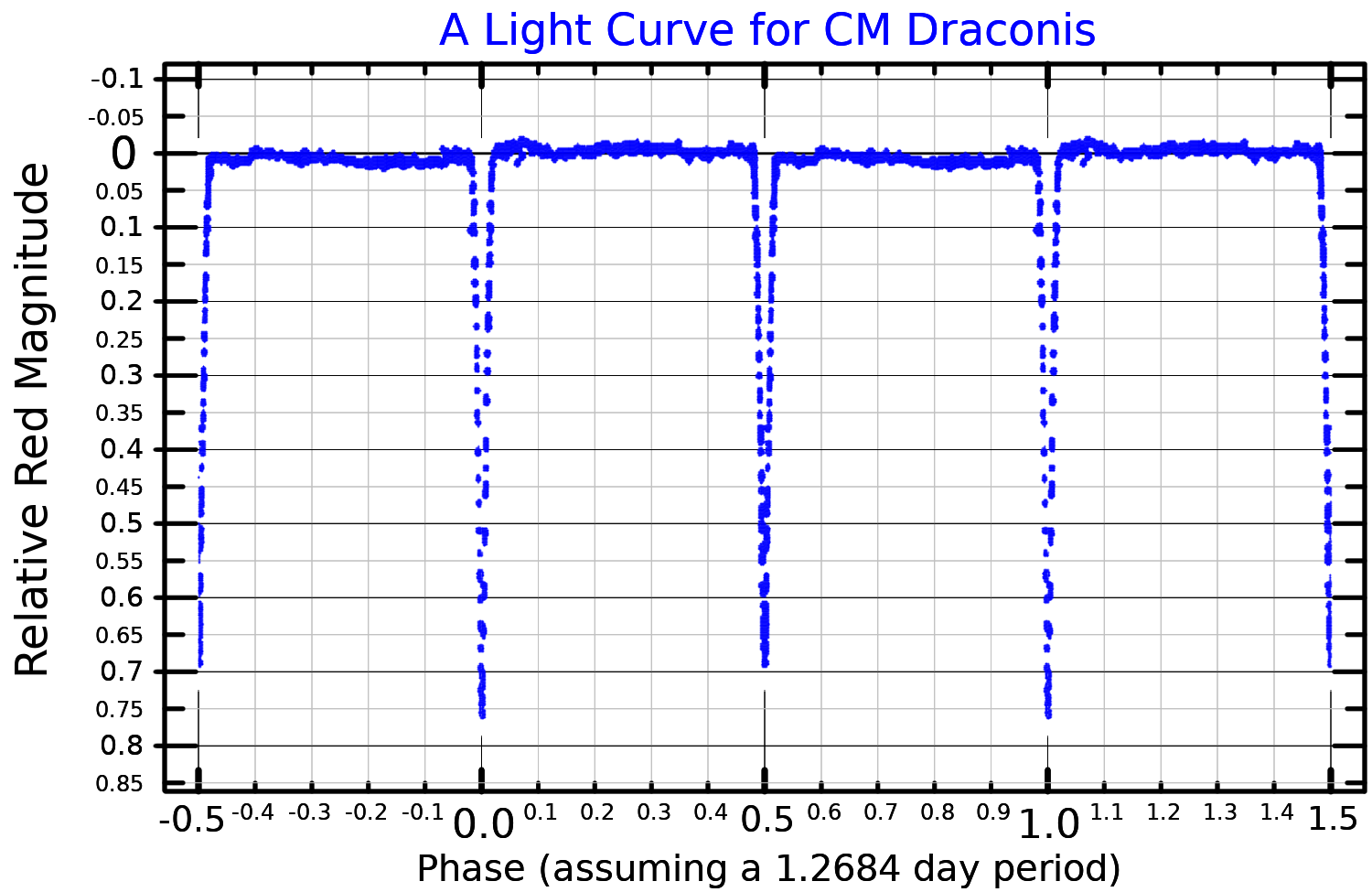
- A red band light curve for CM Draconis, adapted from Kozhevnikova et al. (2009)

Observation data Epoch J2000.0 Equinox ICRS
- Constellation: Draco
- Right ascension: 16^{h} 34^{m} 20.33027^{s}
- Declination: +57° 09′ 44.3689″
- Apparent magnitude (V): 12.87

Characteristics
- Spectral type: M4.5V / M4.5V / DQ8
- Variable type: BY Draconis variable Eclipsing binary Flare star

Astrometry
Radial velocity (R_{v})	–118.24 km/s
Proper motion (μ)	RA: –1113.797 mas/yr Dec.: 1180.977 mas/yr
Parallax (π)	67.2876±0.0337 mas
Distance	48.47 ± 0.02 ly (14.862 ± 0.007 pc)
Absolute magnitude (M_{V})	12.1

Orbit
Period (P)	1.268390011(3) d
Semi-major axis (a)	3.6712±0.0053 R_{☉}
Eccentricity (e)	0.0038±0.0031
Inclination (i)	89.96±0.06°
Longitude of the node (Ω)	15.79°
Periastron epoch (T)	58738.65954(15)
Argument of periastron (ω) (secondary)	119±3°
Semi-amplitude (K_{1}) (primary)	72.23 km/s
Semi-amplitude (K_{2}) (secondary)	77.95 km/s

Details

Aa
Mass	0.2307±0.0008 M_{☉}
Radius	0.2638±0.0011 R_{☉}
Luminosity	0.0060±0.0005 L_{☉}
Surface gravity (log g)	4.959±0.006 cgs
Temperature	3130±70 K
Metallicity [Fe/H]	−0.30±0.12 dex
Age	8.5±3.5 Gyr

Ab
Mass	0.2136±0.0008 M_{☉}
Radius	0.2458±0.0010 R_{☉}
Luminosity (bolometric)	0.0050±0.0004 L_{☉}
Surface gravity (log g)	4.959±0.006 cgs
Temperature	3103±70 K
Metallicity [Fe/H]	−0.30±0.12 dex
Age	8.5±3.5 Gyr

B
Mass	0.55±0.03 M_{☉}
Surface gravity (log g)	7.97±0.06 cgs
Temperature	6,006±119 K
Age	8.5±3.5 Gyr

Other designations
- Eclipsing binary: CM Dra, GJ 630.1A, CCDM J16343+5710A, WDS J16345+5709A, LHS 421, LP 101-15, NLTT 43148, TIC 199574208
- White dwarf: GJ 630.1B, CCDM J16343+5710B, WDS J16345+5709B, EGGR 258, LHS 422, LP 101-16, NLTT 43149, WD 1633+572, TIC 199574211

Database references
SIMBAD	A
- B
ARICNS	A
- B

CM Draconis (GJ 630.1A) is an eclipsing binary star system 48.5 light-years (14.9 parsecs) away in the constellation of Draco (the Dragon). The system consists of two nearly identical red dwarf stars that orbit each other with a period of roughly 1.268 days and a semi-major axis of 3.6712 solar radii (0.017073 au; 2,554,100 km). Along with two stars in the triple system KOI-126, the stars in CM Draconis are among the lightest stars with precisely measured masses and radii. Consequently, the system plays an important role in testing stellar structure models for very low mass stars. These comparisons find that models underpredict the stellar radii by approximately 5%. This is attributed to consequences of the stars' strong magnetic activity.

According to the system's entry in the Combined General Catalogue of Variable Stars, at least one of the components is a flare star and at least one is a BY Draconis variable. The white dwarf star GJ 630.1B, also known as WD 1633+572, located 25.7 arcseconds away shares the same proper motion as the CM Draconis stars and is thus a true companion star of the system. Given the system's distance of 47 light years, this corresponds to a separation of at least 370 astronomical units between CM Draconis and GJ 630.1B.

== History of observations ==
CM Draconis was discovered to be an eclipsing binary by Olin J. Eggen and Allan Sandage in 1967; at that time it was known by the designation LP 101-15. It was the second M-dwarf eclipsing binary discovered after YY Geminorum (Castor C), and they remained the only two known until CU Cancri (GJ 2069 A) was found to be an eclipsing binary in 1999.

== Search for planets ==
The system was the subject of a dedicated search for transiting extrasolar planets in orbit around the binary from 1994–1999. In the end, the existence of all of the transiting planet candidates suggested by the project was ruled out.

Based on variations in the timing of the system's eclipses, it has been suggested that there may be an object in a circumbinary orbit around the two red dwarf stars. In 2000, it was proposed that a Jovian planet is orbiting the system with a period of 750–1050 days. A later analysis of timing variations did not confirm this proposed planet and instead suggested that there was a Jovian planet in an 18.5-year orbit, or a more massive object further out. This analysis was itself not supported by a 2009 study that found the eclipse timings were indistinguishable from linear, though the binary stars do have a small eccentricity that may indicate that they are being perturbed by an orbiting body that prevents the orbit from being fully circularised by tidal effects. A massive planet or brown dwarf on an orbit of 50–200 days would fulfil the observational criteria: the requirement for dynamical stability, the constraints from the lack of observed timing variations and the requirement that the object can maintain the eccentricity of the binary stars.

Eclipse timing variations were again discussed by a 2025 study, which found the variations may be caused by either a planet or by intrinsic stellar activity.
