= NN Serpentis =

Eclipsing post-common envelope binary star system in the constellation Serpens

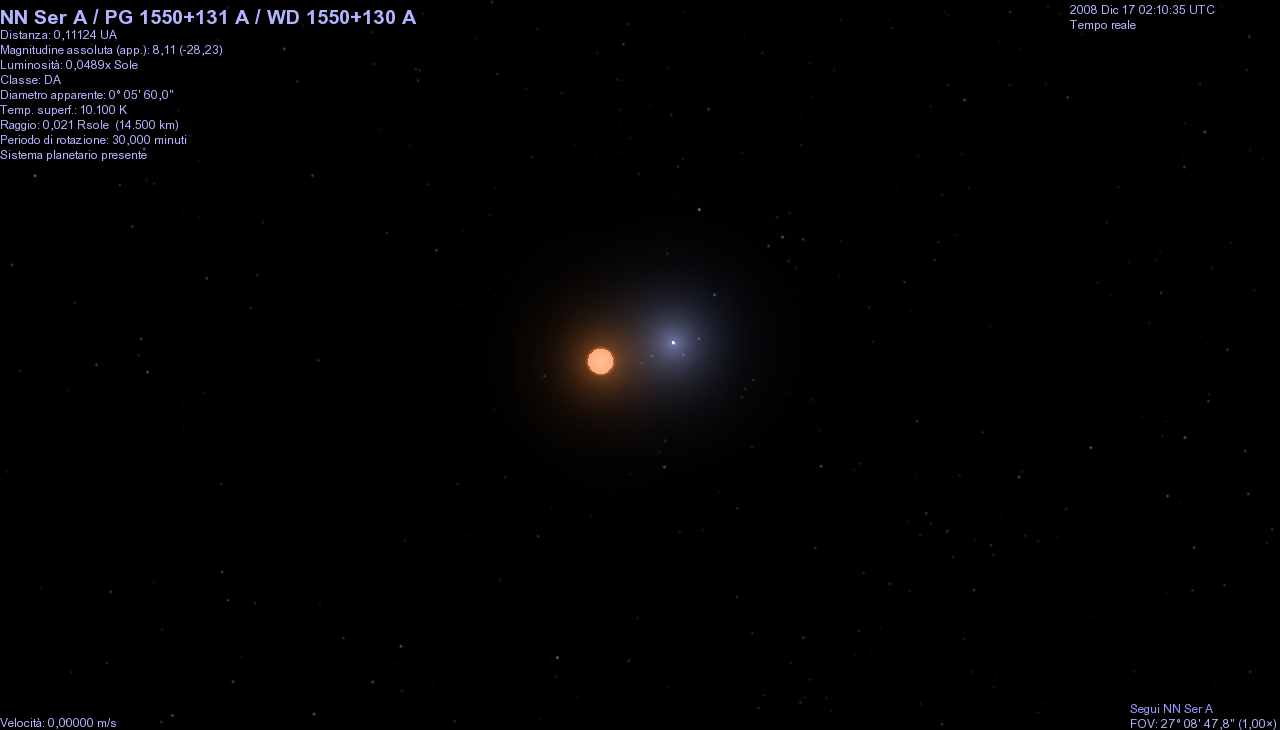
- Rendering of NN Serpentis system

Observation data Epoch J2000 Equinox ICRS
- Constellation: Serpens
- Right ascension: 15^{h} 52^{m} 56.12035^{s}
- Declination: +12° 54′ 44.4293″
- Apparent magnitude (V): +16.51

Characteristics
- Spectral type: WD DAO1 / M4V

Astrometry
Proper motion (μ)	RA: −30.170±0.055 mas/yr Dec.: −59.084±0.057 mas/yr
Parallax (π)	1.9438±0.0662 mas
Distance	1,680 ± 60 ly (510 ± 20 pc)

Orbit
Period (P)	0.13008017141(17) d
Semi-major axis (a)	0.934 ± 0.009 R_{☉}
Eccentricity (e)	0.0
Inclination (i)	89.6 ± 0.2°
Semi-amplitude (K_{1}) (primary)	62.3 ± 1.9 km/s
Semi-amplitude (K_{2}) (secondary)	301 ± 3 km/s

Details

White dwarf
Mass	0.535 ± 0.012 M_{☉}
Radius	0.0211 ± 0.0002 R_{☉}
Surface gravity (log g)	7.47 ± 0.01 cgs
Temperature	57000 ± 3000 K

Red dwarf
Mass	0.111 ± 0.004 M_{☉}
Radius	0.149 ± 0.002 R_{☉}

Other designations
- NN Ser, PG 1550+131, WD 1550+130

Database references
SIMBAD	data

NN Serpentis (abbreviated NN Ser) is an eclipsing post-common envelope binary system approximately 1670 light-years away. The system comprises an eclipsing white dwarf and red dwarf. The two stars orbit each other every 0.13 days.

In 1982, Richard F. Green et al. found the star in the Palomar Green Survey, and determined it to be a possible cataclysmic variable star. They gave it the name PG 1550+131. Photometric observations by John W. Wilson et al. in 1983 showed that PG 1550+131 was indeed a variable star. Reinhold Haefner discovered that the star is an eclipsing binary, in 1988. It was given its variable star designation, NN Serpentis, in 1989.

== Planetary system ==
A planetary system has been inferred to exist around NN Ser by several teams. All of these teams rely on the fact that Earth sits in the same plane as the NN Serpentis binary star system, so humans can see the larger red dwarf eclipse the white dwarf every 0.13 days. Astronomers are then able to use these frequent eclipses to spot a pattern of small but significant irregularities in the orbit of stars, which could be attributed to the presence and gravitational influence of circumbinary planets.

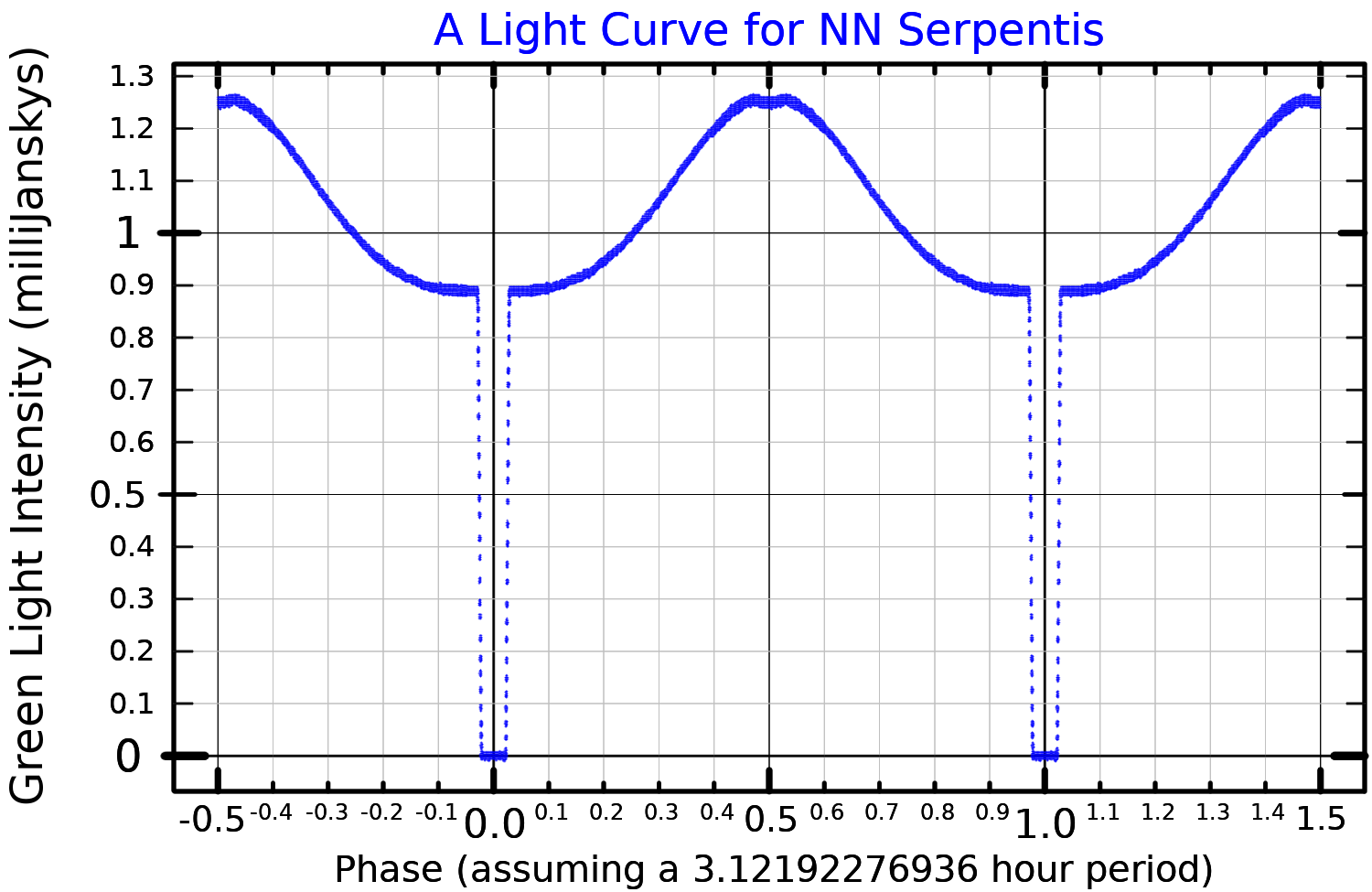
A green light light curve for NN Serpentis, adapted from Parsons et al. (2010)

Chen (2009) used these "eclipse timing variations" to suggesting a putative orbital period spanning between 30 and 285 years and a minimum mass between 0.0043 and 0.18 Solar masses.

In late 2009, Qian estimated a minimum mass of 10.7 Jupiter masses and orbital period of 7.56 years for this planet, probably located at 3.29 Astronomical Units. This has since been disproven by further measurements of the eclipse times of the binary stars.

In late 2009 and 2010, researchers from the UK (University of Warwick and the University of Sheffield), Germany (Georg-August-Universitat in Göttingen, Eberhard-Karls-Universitat in Tübingen), Chile (Universidad de Valparaíso), and the United States (University of Texas at Austin) suggested that the eclipse timing variations are caused by two gas giant planets. The more massive gas giant is about 6 times the mass of Jupiter and orbits the binary star every 15.5 years, the other orbits every 7.75 years and is about 1.6 times the mass of Jupiter.

All published planetary models have failed to predict changes in eclipse timing since 2018, suggesting that a different explanation for the eclipse timing variations may be needed.

The NN Serpentis planetary system
Companion (in order from star)	Mass	Semimajor axis (AU)	Orbital period (days)	Eccentricity	Inclination (°)	Radius
d (controversial)	2.28 ± 0.38 M_{J}	3.39 ± 0.1	2830 ± 130	0.2 ± 0.02	—	—
c (controversial)	6.91 ± 0.54 M_{J}	5.38 ± 0.2	5660 ± 165	0	—	—

== See also ==
- Algol
- HW Virginis
- CM Draconis
- Kepler-16
- Kepler-47, another binary system with 3 planets
