= HD 142415 b =

Extrasolar planet in the constellation Norma

Discovery
- Discovered by: Mayor et al.
- Discovery site: La Silla Observatory
- Discovery date: 30 June 2003
- Detection method: doppler spectroscopy (CORALIE)

Orbital characteristics
- Apastron: 1.605 AU (240.1 million km)
- Periastron: 0.535 AU (80.0 million km)
- Semi-major axis: 1.07 AU (160 million km)
- Eccentricity: 0.5
- Orbital period (sidereal): 386.3±1.6 d 1.058 y
- Average orbital speed: 30.2
- Time of periastron: 2,451,519 ± 4
- Argument of periastron: 255 ± 4
- Semi-amplitude: 51.3 ± 2.3
- Star: HD 142415

HD 142415 b is an exoplanet with the semi-amplitude of 51.3 ± 2.3 m/s. This indicates the minimum mass of 1.69 Jupiter masses, an orbital period of 386.3 days, and the semi-major axis of 1.07 astronomical units based from its stellar mass. The wild, oval pathed wobble of the star used by Doppler spectrometer indicates that the orbit of the planet is highly eccentric at around 50%.

The planet was discovered in La Silla Observatory on 30 June 2003 by Mayor, who used the CORALIE spectrograph.

== See also ==
- HD 10647 b
- HD 111232 b
- HD 141937 b
- HD 142022 Ab
- HD 169830 c
- HD 216770 b
- HD 41004 Ab
- HD 65216 b
