= HD 216770 =

Star in the constellation Piscis Austrinus

Observation data Epoch J2000 Equinox ICRS
- Constellation: Piscis Austrinus
- Right ascension: 22^{h} 55^{m} 53.708^{s}
- Declination: –26° 39′ 31.54″
- Apparent magnitude (V): 8.11

Characteristics
- Spectral type: K0V or G9VCN+1
- B−V color index: 0.821

Astrometry
Radial velocity (R_{v})	31.141±0.0004 km/s
Proper motion (μ)	RA: 226.237 mas/yr Dec.: −177.985 mas/yr
Parallax (π)	27.2923±0.0245 mas
Distance	119.5 ± 0.1 ly (36.64 ± 0.03 pc)
Absolute magnitude (M_{V})	5.22

Details
Mass	0.74±0.07 M_{☉}
Radius	0.93±0.02 R_{☉}
Luminosity	0.79 L_{☉}
Surface gravity (log g)	4.37±0.04 cgs
Temperature	5,399±18 K
Metallicity [Fe/H]	0.27 dex
Rotation	35.6 d
Rotational velocity (v sin i)	1.4 km/s
Age	3.1 Gyr

Other designations
- CD−27°16109, GC 31973, HIP 113238, SAO 191502, LTT 9276, NLTT 55283

Database references
SIMBAD	data

HD 216770 is a star with an orbiting exoplanet in the southern constellation of Piscis Austrinus. With an apparent visual magnitude of 8.11, it is too faint to be visible to the naked eye. It is located at a distance of 120 light years from the Sun, as determined by parallax measurements, and is drifting further away with a radial velocity of 31.1 km/s. The star shows a high proper motion, traversing the celestial sphere at an angular rate of 0.302 arcsec yr^{−1}.

The spectrum of HD 216770 presents as a late G-type main-sequence star, a yellow dwarf, with a stellar classification of G9VCN+1, where the suffix notation indicates anomalously strong band of CN. The star is smaller than the Sun, with 74% of the Sun's mass and 93% of the Sun's radius. It is about three billion years old and is spinning slowly with a rotation period of 35.6 days. The abundance of iron, a measure of the metallicity of the star, is higher than solar. The star is radiating 79% of the luminosity of the Sun from its photosphere at an effective temperature of 5,399 K.

In 2003 an exoplanet was announced orbiting it by the Geneva Extrasolar Planet Search team. As the inclination of the orbital plane is unknown, only a lower bound on the mass of the object can be determined. It has at least 65% of the mass of Jupiter. The body has an eccentric orbit with a period of 118.5 days.

The HD 216770 planetary system
Companion (in order from star)	Mass	Semimajor axis (AU)	Orbital period (days)	Eccentricity	Inclination (°)	Radius
b	>0.65 M_{J}	0.46	118.45 ± 0.55	0.37 ± 0.06	—	—

== See also ==
- HD 10647
- HD 108874
- HD 111232
- HD 142415
- HD 169830
- HD 41004
- HD 65216
- Lists of exoplanets
