= HD 114762 =

Triple star system in the constellation Coma Berenices

Observation data Epoch J2000.0 Equinox ICRS
- Constellation: Coma Berenices
- Right ascension: 13^{h} 12^{m} 19.74107^{s}
- Declination: +17° 31′ 01.6303″
- Apparent magnitude (V): 7.30 + 15.00

Characteristics

A
- Evolutionary stage: subgiant
- Spectral type: F9
- B−V color index: 0.525

B
- Evolutionary stage: Main sequence
- Spectral type: sdM9
- J−K color index: 0.70

Astrometry
Radial velocity (R_{v})	49.63±0.18 km/s
Proper motion (μ)	RA: −580.999 mas/yr Dec.: 1.062 mas/yr
Parallax (π)	26.1979±0.1082 mas
Distance	124.5 ± 0.5 ly (38.2 ± 0.2 pc)

Details

HD 114762 A
Mass	1.046±0.040 M_{☉}
Radius	1.24±0.05 R_{☉}
Surface gravity (log g)	4.18±0.03 cgs
Temperature	5869±13 K
Metallicity [Fe/H]	−0.72+0.05 −0.07 dex
Age	12±4 Gyr

HD 114762 Ab
Mass	0.293+0.103 −0.056 M_{☉}

HD 114762 B
Mass	0.0879 M_{☉}
Radius	0.100 R_{☉}
Luminosity	0.00043 L_{☉}
Surface gravity (log g)	5.381 cgs
Temperature	2,645 K
Metallicity [Fe/H]	−0.71 dex
Age	~10 Gyr

Other designations
- BD+18 2700, HD 114762, HIP 64426, SAO 100458, 2MASS J13121982+1731016

Database references
SIMBAD	data
Exoplanet Archive	data
ARICNS	data

HD 114762 is a triple star system approximately 125 light-years (38.2 pc) away in the constellation Coma Berenices. It consists of a yellow-white F-type main-sequence star (HD 114762 A) and two red dwarf companions (HD 114762 Ab & HD 114762 B) approximately 0.36 & 130 AU distant. Both are low-metal subdwarfs. Planets around such metal-poor stars are rare (three known cases are HD 22781, HD 111232, and HD 181720). A telescope or strong binoculars are needed to view the primary. HD 114762 had been used by scientists as a "standard star", one whose radial velocity is well established, but with the discovery of the spectroscopic companion HD 114762 Ab its usefulness as a standard has been called into question.

The smaller red dwarf companion (HD 114762 B) is classified as an ultra-cool dwarf, with a spectral type around M9. With a visual magnitude of 15 and separated from the primary by only three arcseconds, it can only be seen with a powerful telescope. It is estimated to be around 10 billion years old, although the properties of such low-mass stars are very similar across a wide range of ages. It is calculated have only 8% of the mass of the Sun, a tenth of its radius, and with a temperature of about 2,645 K it produces less than a thousandth of its luminosity.

== Spectroscopic companion ==
In 1989, a companion object, HD 114762 Ab, was found orbiting HD 114762 A by Latham, et al., using Doppler spectroscopy, but its existence was not confirmed until 1991 by Cochran, et al. Its orbital distance and revolution is similar to that of Mercury, though it has twice the eccentricity. It has a minimum mass of 10.69 M_{J}, and thus was originally thought to be a massive exoplanet; however, in 2019, its inclination was determined by Gaia astrometry, giving it a true mass of 141 M_{J}. This makes it a red dwarf star, or a massive brown dwarf. A 2020 study provided further confirmation of this, and revised the mass upwards to 147 M_{J}, and in 2022 this mass was revised upwards still further, to 0.293 M_{☉}, based on Gaia DR3 data and a similar upwards revision to the mass of the primary star.
