= HD 111232 b =

Extrasolar planet in the constellation of Musca

Discovery
- Discovered by: Mayor et al.
- Discovery site: La Silla Observatory, Chile
- Discovery date: 30 June 2003
- Detection method: Doppler Spectroscopy (CORALIE)

Orbital characteristics
- Semi-major axis: 2.148+0.088 −0.097 AU
- Eccentricity: 0.214+0.005 −0.003
- Orbital period (sidereal): 3.201+0.002 −0.001 yr
- Inclination: 93.521°+16.622° −18.063°
- Longitude of ascending node: 358.306°+52.528° −32.102°
- Time of periastron: 2452361.045+4.144 −3.497
- Argument of periastron: 94.142°+0.920° −0.719°
- Semi-amplitude: 160.429+0.573 −0.509 m/s
- Star: HD 111232

Physical characteristics
- Mass: 7.965+1.128 −0.479 M_{J}

HD 111232 b is an extrasolar planet that orbits at almost 2 AU with a minimum mass of 6.8 times that of Jupiter. This planet was discovered in the La Silla Observatory by Michel Mayor using the CORALIE spectrograph on 30 June 2003, along with six other planets, including HD 41004 Ab, HD 65216 b, HD 169830 c, HD 216770 b, HD 10647 b, and HD 142415 b.

An astrometric measurement of the planet's inclination and true mass was published in 2022 as part of Gaia DR3.
