= Lead star =

Star with an overabundance of lead

A lead star is a low-metallicity star with an overabundance of the elements lead and bismuth as compared to other products of the S-process. Many of these lead stars have more lead in them than any other element heavier than iron. The amount of lead in each of these stars is roughly the mass of the Moon. This type of star confirms predictions about the abundances of elements above iron in AGB stars.

It is theorised that lead is produced in AGB stars by the s-process, the capture of neutrons to produce progressively-heavier elements. The neutrons in AGB stars are produced primarily by the collision of carbon and helium nuclei, producing an oxygen nucleus and a neutron. The process is slow, with decades passing between the capture of each neutron in a nucleus, but in low-metallicity stars, the neutrons are all captured by the relatively few high-mass nuclei in their atmospheres. This leads to most heavy elements being converted to the highest stable mass, which is lead; as more lead is produced, the other heavy elements become depleted.

Several stars have been confirmed to be lead stars. Among them are HD 187861, HD 196944 and HD 224959. In one study, nine stars were detected with high lead abundances and most of them were carbon-enhanced metal-poor stars (CEMP stars). There was also the discovery of two hot subdwarf stars named HE 2359−2844 and HE 1256−2738. Both of these stars had lead abundances nearly 10,000 times that of the Sun in their atmospheres.

== See also ==
- Barium star
- Carbon star
