= HD 190984 b =

Extrasolar planet in the constellation Pavo

Discovery
- Discovered by: Santos et al.
- Discovery site: La Silla Observatory
- Discovery date: October 19, 2009
- Detection method: radial velocity (HARPS)

Orbital characteristics
- Semi-major axis: 8.8+2.5 −1.4 AU
- Eccentricity: 0.745+0.054 −0.047
- Orbital period (sidereal): 9971+4383 −2228 d 27.3+12.0 −6.1 yr
- Average orbital speed: 12.2
- Inclination: 64°+18° −23° or 116°+23° −18°
- Longitude of ascending node: 108°+51° −82°
- Time of periastron: 2464428+4507 −2245
- Argument of periastron: 315.3°±3.7°
- Semi-amplitude: 48 ± 1
- Star: HD 190984

Physical characteristics
- Mass: 3.58+1.2 −0.45 M_{J}

HD 190984 b (also known as HIP 99496 b) is an exoplanet which orbits the F-type main sequence star HD 190984, located approximately 486 light-years away in the constellation Pavo. This planet has a minimum mass three times that of Jupiter and takes 13 years and four-and-a-half months to orbit the star at a semimajor axis of 5.5 AU with an eccentricity of 0.57. This planet was detected by HARPS on October 19, 2009, together with 29 other planets.

Since this is a very long-period planet detected by the radial velocity method and this planet didn't complete its orbit during the continuous observations, the error range for orbital period is very large, at 4885 ± 1600 days or 13.37 ± 4.4 years. This puts it in the range of semimajor axes between 4.2 and 6.6 AU. So this planet will need more years of observations to better constrain the period and semimajor axis.

In 2023, the inclination and true mass of HD 190984 b were determined via astrometry, and its orbit was updated, finding a longer period and larger semi-major axis than previously estimated, although still with a large margin of error.

== See also ==
- HD 5388 b
- HD 181720 b
- 23 Librae c
