= Q Eridani =

q Eridani refers to 2 distinct star systems in the constellation Eridanus:

- q^{1} Eridani, better known as HD 10647, has a planet (b)
- q^{2} Eridani, better known as HD 10939
