= WISEA 1810−1010 =

Substellar object in Serpens constellation

WISEA 1810-1010
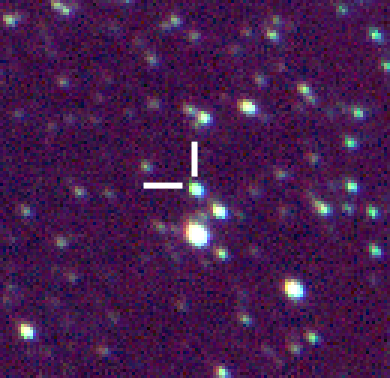
- near-infrared image of WISEA 1810-1010

Observation data Epoch J2000 Equinox J2000
- Constellation: Serpens
- Right ascension: 18^{h} 10^{m} 06.18^{s}
- Declination: −10° 10′ 00.5″

Characteristics
- Evolutionary stage: brown dwarf
- Spectral type: esdT3:
- Apparent magnitude (J): 17.264 ± 0.020
- Apparent magnitude (H): 16.500 ± 0.018
- Apparent magnitude (K): 17.162 ± 0.081

Astrometry
Radial velocity (R_{v})	−83±13 km/s
Proper motion (μ)	RA: −1027.0±3.5 mas/yr Dec.: −246.4±3.6 mas/yr
Parallax (π)	112.5±8.1 mas
Distance	29 ± 2 ly (8.9 ± 0.6 pc)
Absolute bolometric magnitude (M_{bol})	19.850+0.082 −0.074

Details
Mass	17+56 −12 M_{Jup}
Radius	0.65+0.31 −0.19 R_{Jup}
Surface gravity (log g)	5.0±0.25 cgs
Temperature	1000±100 K
Metallicity [Fe/H]	−1.7±0.2 dex

Other designations
- WISEA J181006.18-101000.5, CWISEP J181006.00-101001.1

Database references
SIMBAD	data

WISEA J181006.18-101000.5 or WISEA 1810-1010 is a substellar object in the constellation Serpens about 8.9 parsec or 29 light-years distant from earth. It stands out because of its peculiar colors matching both L-type and T-type objects, likely due to its very low metallicity. Together with WISEA 0414−5854 it is the first discovered extreme subdwarf (esd) of spectral type T. Lodieu et al. describe WISEA 1810-1010 as a water vapor dwarf due to its atmosphere being dominated by hydrogen and water vapor.

== Discovery ==
WISEA 1810-1010 was first identified with the NEOWISE proper motion survey in 2016, but the proper motion could not be confirmed because of the high density of background stars in this field near the galactic plane. In 2020 the object was re-examined with the WiseView tool by the researchers of the Backyard Worlds project and was found to have significant proper motion. Additionally the object was independently discovered by the citizen scientist Arttu Sainio via the Backyard Worlds project.

== Observations ==
The object was initially observed by the Backyard Worlds researchers from US and Canada with Keck/NIRES and Palomar/TripleSpec. Later it was observed by another team from Spain, UK and Poland with NOT/ALFOSC, GTC/multiple instruments and Calar Alto/Omega2000. Additional photometry and a spectrum was obtained with GTC/EMIR.

Analysis of the Keck and Palomar spectrum found that WISEA 1810-1010 has much deeper 1.15 μm (Y/J-band) absorption when compared to the extreme subdwarf of spectral type L7 2MASS 0532+8246, but the shape of the H-band is similar to this esdL7. The Y- and J-band spectrum does match better with spectra from subdwarfs with early spectral type T.

== Distance and physical properties ==
The distance was first poorly constrained at either 14 or 67 parsec, but using archived and new data the parallax was measured, which constrained the distance to 8.9+0.7
−0.6 pc.

The object has a mass of 17+56
−12 M_{J}, which makes this object a brown dwarf or a sub-brown dwarf, with a temperature of 700 to 900 K. A spectral type of esdT3: was estimated based on a new work that introduced a new classification scheme for cold subdwarfs. The prefix esd stands for "extreme subdwarfs" and the double point stands for a highly uncertain numerical spectral type. Best-fitted SAND models find a temperature and radius similar to the previous estimate by Lodieu et al. The motion of WISEA 1810-1010 was used to predict a 91% probability of thin disk membership and a 9% probability of thick disk membership. It is however noted that high probability of thin disk membership, does not rule out thick disk membership. Updated radial velocity measurements did find a higher probability for thick disk membership.

== Atmosphere ==
The only chemicals detected in the atmosphere of WISEA 1810-1010 were hydrogen and strong absorption due to water vapor. This was surprising because T-dwarfs are defined by methane in their atmosphere and the hotter L-dwarfs are partly defined by carbon monoxide in their atmosphere. Both were missing in WISEA 1810-1010. The missing of carbon monoxide and methane were explained by a carbon-deficient and metal-poor atmosphere. Alternatively the spectrum could have been explained by an oxygen-enhanced atmosphere. Later a spectrum with the Gran Telescopio Canarias did detect 17±6 ppm of methane, but no carbon monoxide and no potassium. The carbon abundance was determined to be [C/H]=-1.5+/-0.2 dex. The spectrum also shows an unknown absorption feature at 15720 Å.

Model spectra suggest a very metal-poor atmosphere with $[Fe/H]=-1.5\plusmn0.5$.

== Spectral type ==
Schneider et al. noted first the similarities of the spectrum with both L-dwarfs and T-dwarfs. The tentative classification as esdT0.0±1.0 was given due to the low estimated temperature. The discovery by Lodieu et al. that methane was not present in the near-infrared spectrum raised the question if a T-dwarf classification was possible. Methane is a key diagnostic feature for T-dwarfs. Jun-Yan Zhang et al. noted that WISEA 1810 cannot be classified as an L-dwarf either because of some key differences, such as:

- A redder W1–W2 color.
- Missing hydrides (such as FeH), which become stronger in metal-poor L-dwarfs.
- L-subdwarfs have little water absorptions, but WISEA 1810 has deep water absorptions

JWST observations of the methane band and other molecules in the mid-infrared of WISEA 1810 or other proposed esdT might resolve the question if these objects can be classified as T-dwarfs. If these objects cannot be classified as T-dwarfs, they might be given a new spectral type. Jun-Yan Zhang et al. proposed the letters H or Z (therefore H-dwarf or Z-dwarf). New esdT (or H/Z-dwarfs) might be discovered in the future with ESA's Euclid and the Rubin Observatory. A spectrum from the ground did however detect methane, showing that the classification of WISEA 1810-1010 is consistent with a T-dwarf.

== See also ==
- 2MASSI J0937347+293142 first subdwarf of spectral type T
- WISE 1534–1043 likely first subdwarf of spectral type Y
- List of star systems within 25–30 light-years
