= HD 190984 =

Star in the constellation Pavo

Observation data Epoch J2000.0 Equinox ICRS
- Constellation: Pavo
- Right ascension: 20^{h} 11^{m} 30.71538^{s}
- Declination: −64° 37′ 13.6853″
- Apparent magnitude (V): 8.76

Characteristics
- Evolutionary stage: main sequence
- Spectral type: F8 V
- U−B color index: +0.02
- B−V color index: +0.54

Astrometry
Radial velocity (R_{v})	+20.48±0.14 km/s
Proper motion (μ)	RA: +0.193 mas/yr Dec.: +45.355 mas/yr
Parallax (π)	6.7060±0.0153 mas
Distance	486 ± 1 ly (149.1 ± 0.3 pc)
Absolute magnitude (M_{V})	+2.25

Details
Mass	1.15±0.01 M_{☉}
Radius	2.31±0.09 R_{☉}
Luminosity	5.88±1.01 L_{☉}
Surface gravity (log g)	3.78±0.03 cgs
Temperature	6,007±25 K
Metallicity	−0.49±0.02
Rotational velocity (v sin i)	5 km/s
Age	4.44±0.10 Gyr

Other designations
- CD−64°1271, CPD−64°4030, HD 190984, HIP 99496, PPM 364454, 2MASS J20113069-6437136

Database references
SIMBAD	data
Exoplanet Archive	data

HD 190984, also known as HIP 99496, is a star located in the southern circumpolar constellation Pavo, the peacock. It has an apparent magnitude of 8.76, making it readily visible in small telescopes, but not to the naked eye. Based on parallax measurements from the Gaia spacecraft, the object is estimated to be 486 light years away from the Solar System. It appears to be receding with a heliocentric radial velocity of 20.3 km/s.

== Characteristics ==
This is an ordinary F-type main-sequence star with a stellar classification of F8 V, generating energy via hydrogen fusion at its core. It has 115% the mass of the Sun and an effective temperature of 6,007 K, giving it a yellowish-white hue. However, HD 190984 has an enlarged radius of 2.31 R_{☉} and is 1.76 magnitudes brighter than the main sequence, indicating that it may instead be a subgiant evolving towards the red giant branch; it radiates 5.88 times the luminosity of the Sun from its photosphere. Unlike most planetary hosts, HD 190984 has an iron abundance only 32% that of the Sun's, making it metal poor. At an age of 4.44 billion years, it is spinning with a projected rotational velocity of 5 km/s.

== Planetary system ==
A 2010 HARPS survey detected a super Jupiter orbiting the star. It has one of the longest periods of any exoplanet known at the time, but the value is poorly constrained. Further observations are required to properly constrain the orbit. In 2023, the inclination and true mass of HD 190984 b were determined via astrometry.

The HD 190984 planetary system
Companion (in order from star)	Mass	Semimajor axis (AU)	Orbital period (years)	Eccentricity	Inclination (°)	Radius
b	3.58+1.2 −0.45 M_{J}	8.8+2.5 −1.4	27.3+12.0 −6.1	0.745+0.054 −0.047	64+18 −23 or 116+23 −18	—

== See also ==
- HD 5388
- HD 181720
- List of extrasolar planets
