= GJ 1062 =

Star in the constellation Eridanus

Observation data Epoch J2000.0 Equinox ICRS
- Constellation: Eridanus
- Right ascension: 03^{h} 38^{m} 15.69799^{s}
- Declination: −11° 29′ 13.5050″
- Apparent magnitude (V): +13.010

Characteristics
- Spectral type: d/sdM2
- U−B color index: +1.385
- B−V color index: +1.605
- R−I color index: 1.184

Astrometry
Radial velocity (R_{v})	−84.88±0.56 km/s
Proper motion (μ)	RA: 1,458.201 mas/yr Dec.: −2,696.545 mas/yr
Parallax (π)	61.8861±0.0220 mas
Distance	52.70 ± 0.02 ly (16.159 ± 0.006 pc)
Absolute magnitude (M_{V})	10.608

Details
Mass	0.255 M_{☉}
Radius	0.411±0.051 R_{☉} 0.372±0.076 R_{☉} 0.202±0.012 R_{☉}
Luminosity	0.0055 L_{☉}
Temperature	3,488±50 K
Metallicity [Fe/H]	−0.28±0.15 dex
Rotational velocity (v sin i)	9.80 km/s

Other designations
- GJ 1062, LHS 20, LTT 1717, Ross 578, 2MASS J03381558−1129102

Database references
SIMBAD	data
ARICNS	data

GJ 1062 is a single red dwarf in the constellation Eridanus, positioned about two degrees to the SSE of Epsilon Eridani. It is also known as LHS 20 and Ross 578. The star is invisible to the naked eye with an apparent visual magnitude of +13.0, requiring a telescope with at least a 25 cm (10 in) aperture to view. It is located at a distance of 52.7 light years (16.1 parsecs) from the Sun based on parallax, but is drifting closer with a radial velocity of −85 km/s. The star has a high proper motion, traversing the sky at the rate of 3.033 arcseconds per year.

This is an M-type subdwarf star with a stellar classification of d/sdM2. It was one of the first three subdwarfs to be definitively identified by G. Kuiper in 1940, the other two being Kapteyn's Star and Wolf 1106. GJ 1062 is considered a likely member of the halo population, and thus is a MACHO.
