= 30 Arietis =

Multiple star system in the constellation Aries

- Location of 30 Arietis (circled in red)

Observation data Epoch J2000 Equinox J2000
Constellation	Aries
- 30 Arietis A
Right ascension	02^{h} 37^{m} 00.5235^{s}
Declination	+24° 38′ 49.990″
- Apparent magnitude (V): 6.50
- 30 Arietis B
Right ascension	02^{h} 36^{m} 57.7454^{s}
Declination	+24° 38′ 53.000″
- Apparent magnitude (V): 7.09

Characteristics
- Spectral type: F5 V / F6 V
- B−V color index: 0.410 / 0.510

Astrometry

30 Arietis A
Radial velocity (R_{v})	+24.71±7.77 km/s
Proper motion (μ)	RA: +136.866 mas/yr Dec.: −15.349 mas/yr
Parallax (π)	22.2608±0.0309 mas
Distance	146.5 ± 0.2 ly (44.92 ± 0.06 pc)

30 Arietis B
Radial velocity (R_{v})	+12.38±0.31 km/s
Proper motion (μ)	RA: +140.951 mas/yr Dec.: −10.536 mas/yr
Parallax (π)	22.5107±0.0315 mas
Distance	144.9 ± 0.2 ly (44.42 ± 0.06 pc)

Orbit
Primary	30 Arietis A
Companion	30 Arietis BC
Period (P)	34000 yr
Semi-major axis (a)	40" (1670 AU)

Orbit
Primary	30 Arietis B
Companion	30 Arietis C
Period (P)	80 yr
Semi-major axis (a)	22.3 AU

Orbit
Primary	30 Arietis B
Companion	30 Arietis Bb
Period (P)	339.7+0.3 −0.2 d (0.930±0.001 yr)
Semi-major axis (a)	1.05±0.01 AU
Eccentricity (e)	0.45±0.04
Inclination (i)	2.9±0.3°
Longitude of the node (Ω)	39.0+6.4 −6.3°
Periastron epoch (T)	2458000.5+13.6 −16.0 BJD
Argument of periastron (ω) (secondary)	354+8 −9°
Semi-amplitude (K_{1}) (primary)	281+27 −25 km/s

Details

30 Arietis A
Mass	1.31 ± 0.04 M_{☉}
Radius	1.37 ± 0.03 R_{☉}
Age	860±630 Myr

30 Arietis Ba
Mass	1.16 ± 0.04 M_{☉}
Radius	1.13 ± 0.03 R_{☉}
Age	910±830 Myr

30 Arietis Bb
Mass	188.1+19.7 −18.5 M_{Jup}

Other designations
- CCDM 02370+2439, WDS 02370+2439
- 30 Arietis A: BD+24°376, HD 16246, HIP 12189, HR 765, SAO 75471
- 30 Arietis B: BD+24°375, HD 16232, HIP 12184, HR 764, SAO 75470

Database references
SIMBAD	A
- B
Exoplanet Archive	data

30 Arietis (abbreviated 30 Ari) is a 6th-apparent-magnitude multiple star system in the constellation of Aries. 30 Arietis is the Flamsteed designation. 30 Arietis A and B are separated by 38.1″, or about 1,700 AU at a distance of 145 light-years away. The main components of both systems are both binaries with composite spectra belonging to F-type main-sequence stars, meaning they are fusing hydrogen in their cores. 30 Arietis B also has a second stellar companion, making a total of five stars. The 30 Arietis system is 910 million years old, one fifth the age of the Sun.

== Star system ==
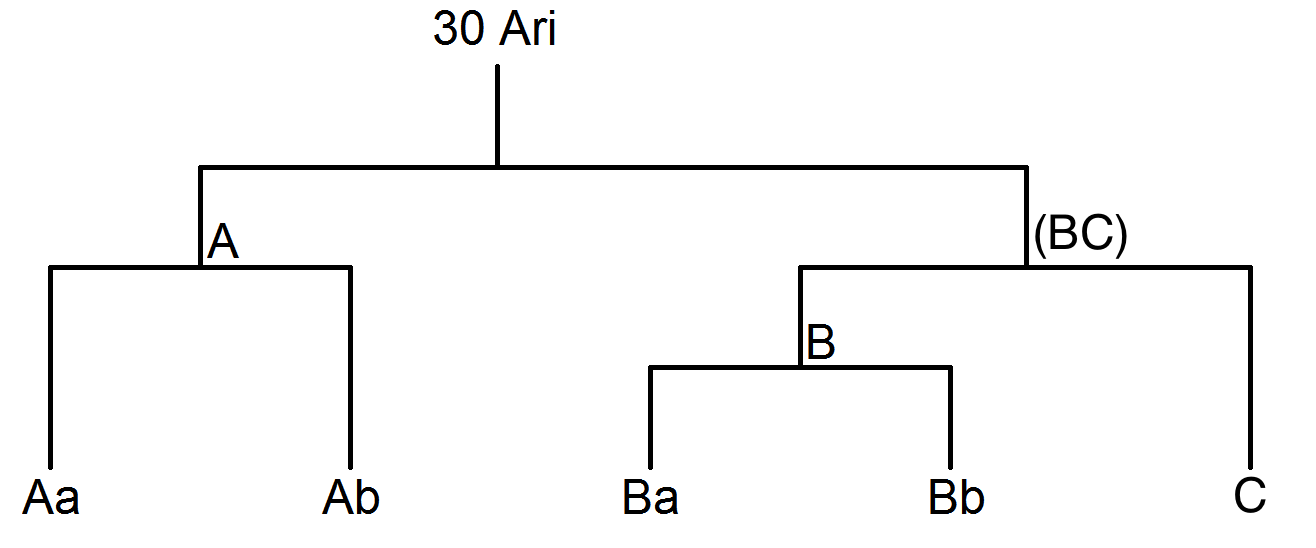
30 Arietis star system hierarchy

30 Arietis A and B are separated by 38.1", corresponding to 1,700 AU at a distance of 145 light-years. The pair are at almost the same distance, have very similar proper motions, and are considered almost certain to be gravitationally bound with a likely period around 34,000 years. The main components of both systems are both binaries with composite spectra belonging to F-type main-sequence stars, meaning they are fusing hydrogen in their cores.

30 Arietis A is a spectroscopic binary with an orbital period of 1.1 days. The primary Aa is an F-type main sequence star about 31% more massive than the Sun, while the companion Ab is a faint red dwarf only about 15% the mass of the Sun.

30 Arietis B has been reported to have a red dwarf companion C at a distance of 22 AU, and another companion Bb at about 1 AU. 30 Arietis Bb has a minimum mass consistent with a giant planet, but in 2020, after the orbital inclination was measured, the "planet" was found to fall in the mass range of a red dwarf star. The more distant companion is referred to as C to distinguish it from Bb, and at about 0.5" it has been imaged using adaptive optics.

== 30 Arietis Bb ==
30 Arietis Bb (sometimes abbreviated 30 Ari Bb) is a red dwarf which orbits the F-type main sequence star 30 Arietis Ba. The red dwarf, initially believed to be a massive planet or brown dwarf, was announced in a paper published online on September 24, 2009. It was discovered by using precision radial velocity measurements from the echelle spectrograph installed on the Alfred-Jensch Telescope in Karl Schwarzschild Observatory. The object has a minimum mass of nearly 10 times that of Jupiter. In 2020, after the inclination of the planetary orbit was measured to be just 4.14^{+0.96}_{−0.90}°, the "planet" was found to fall in the mass range of red dwarf stars.

== See also ==
- HD 114762 b
- HD 114762
