= LS IV-14 116 =

Subdwarf star in the constellation Aquarius

Observation data Epoch J2000.0 Equinox ICRS
- Constellation: Aquarius
- Right ascension: +20^{h} 57^{m} 38.875^{s}
- Declination: −14° 25′ 44.01″
- Apparent magnitude (V): +12.93

Characteristics
- Spectral type: sdB0.5VIIHe18
- B−V color index: −0.16
- Variable type: sdBVr

Astrometry
Proper motion (μ)	RA: +7.409 mas/yr Dec.: −128.265 mas/yr
Parallax (π)	2.3406±0.0543 mas
Distance	1,390 ± 30 ly (427 ± 10 pc)

Details
Mass	0.38 M_{☉}
Radius	0.122 R_{☉}
Luminosity	21 L_{☉}
Surface gravity (log g)	5.94±0.04 cgs
Temperature	34,950±250 K

Other designations
- 2MASS J20573887-1425437, UCAC4 378-169675, V366 Aquarii

Database references
SIMBAD	data

LS IV-14 116 is a hot subdwarf located approximately 2,000 light years away on the border between the constellations Capricornus and Aquarius. It has a surface temperature of approximately 34,000 ± 500 kelvins. Along with stars HE 2359-2844 and HE 1256-2738, LS IV-14 116 forms a new group of star called heavy metal subdwarfs. These are thought to be stars contracting to the extended horizontal branch after a helium flash and ejection of their atmospheres at the tip of the red giant branch.

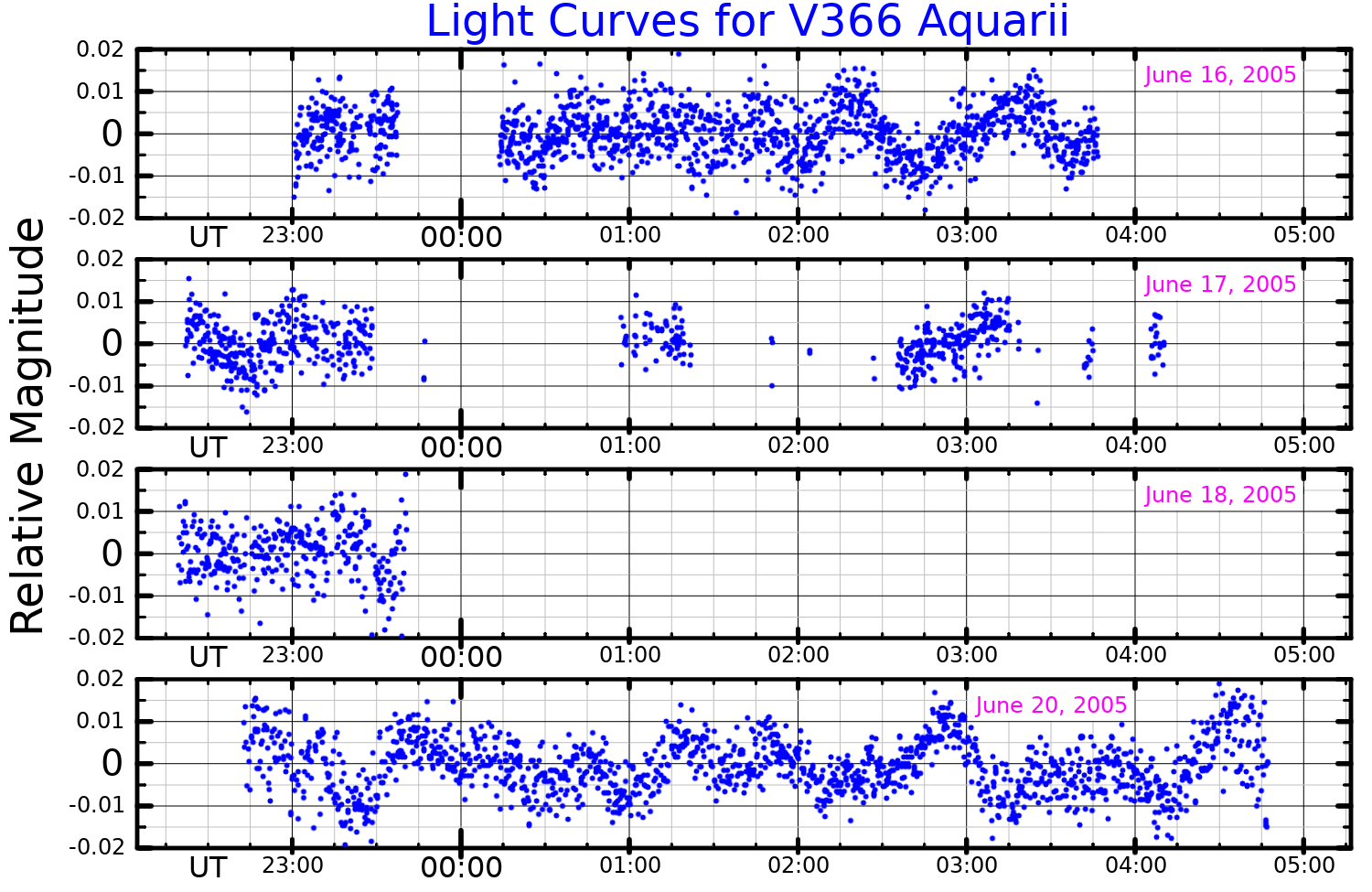
A light curve for V366 Aquarii, adapted from Jeffery (2011)

Amir Ahmad and C. Simon Jeffery discovered that the star is a variable star, in 2004, and published their discovery in 2005. They detected two pulsation periods, 1950 and 2900 seconds. The star's atmosphere contains 10,000 times more zirconium (per unit mass) than the Sun's; it also has between 1,000 and 10,000 times the amount of strontium, germanium and yttrium than the Sun. The heavy metals are believed to be in cloud layers in the atmosphere where the ions of each metal have a particular opacity that allows radiational levitation to balance gravitational settling.
