= HD 142022 Ab =

Extrasolar planet in the constellation Octans

Discovery
- Discovered by: Eggenberger et al.
- Discovery site: La Silla Observatory
- Discovery date: 14 February 2005
- Detection method: Radial Velocity (CORALIE)

Orbital characteristics
- Semi-major axis: 2.939±0.062 AU
- Eccentricity: 0.506+0.071 −0.06
- Orbital period (sidereal): 1935+30 −27 d 5.297+0.082 −0.073 yr
- Average orbital speed: 16.6
- Inclination: 71°±13° or 109°±13°
- Longitude of ascending node: 141°±19°
- Time of periastron: 2456730+50 −44
- Argument of periastron: 168.5°+4.1° −5.0°
- Semi-amplitude: 92 ± 65
- Star: HD 142022 A

Physical characteristics
- Mass: 4.51+0.91 −0.61 M_{J}

HD 142022 Ab is an exoplanet discovered by the radial velocity method by Eggenberger et al. in 2005, after finding that HD 142022 A is wobbling which indicated the presence of a massive planet, with a minimum mass 4.5 times Jupiter. It has a relatively wide separation between the planet and the star of nearly 3 AU, and takes 1928 days or 5.28 years to revolve. As is common for long-period planets, it has a relatively high eccentricity of 53±20%. In 2023, the inclination and true mass of HD 142022 Ab were determined via astrometry.

== See also ==
- HD 141937 b
- HD 142415 b
