= SSSPM J1549−3544 =

Star

Observation data Epoch J2000 Equinox J2000
- Constellation: Lupus
- Right ascension: 15^{h} 48^{m} 40.172^{s}
- Declination: −35° 44′ 26.17″
- Apparent magnitude (V): 14.78

Characteristics
- Spectral type: sdK5

Astrometry
Proper motion (μ)	RA: −597.714 mas/yr Dec.: −535.841 mas/yr
Parallax (π)	10.4127±0.0214 mas
Distance	313.2 ± 0.6 ly (96.0 ± 0.2 pc)
Absolute magnitude (M_{V})	9.5

Details
Radius	0.30 R_{☉}
Luminosity	0.02 L_{☉}
Surface gravity (log g)	5.0 cgs
Temperature	3,956 K
Metallicity [Fe/H]	−1.28 dex

Other designations
- SSSPM J1549−3544, 2MASS J15484023−3544254

Database references
SIMBAD	data

SSSPM J1549−3544 is a star in the constellation Lupus with high proper motion. It was initially found to have high proper motion in a 2003 survey of images taken by the optical SuperCOSMOS Sky Surveys and by the near-infrared sky surveys 2MASS and DENIS. It was then thought to be a cool white dwarf close to the Sun. However, more detailed spectroscopic observations in 2005 appear to show that it is not a white dwarf, but a high-velocity halo metal-poor subdwarf.
