= HD 181720 b =

Extrasolar planet in the constellation Sagittarius

HD 181720 b / Toge
Discovery
- Discovered by: Santos et al.
- Discovery site: La Silla Observatory
- Discovery date: October 19, 2009
- Detection method: radial velocity (HARPS)

Orbital characteristics
- Apastron: 2.24 AU (335,000,000 km)
- Periastron: 1.31 AU (196,000,000 km)
- Semi-major axis: 1.78 AU (266,000,000 km)
- Eccentricity: 0.26 ± 0.06
- Orbital period (sidereal): 956 ± 14 d 2.62 y
- Average orbital speed: 20.3
- Time of periastron: 2,453,631 ± 30
- Argument of periastron: 177 ± 12
- Semi-amplitude: 8.4 ± 0.4
- Star: HD 181720

HD 181720 b is an extrasolar planet which orbits the G-type main sequence star HD 181720, located approximately 190 light years away in the constellation Sagittarius. This planet has at least three-eighths the mass of Jupiter and takes over two and five-eighths years to orbit the star at a semimajor axis of 1.78 AU with an eccentricity of 0.26. This planet was detected by HARPS on October 19, 2009, together with 29 other planets.

The planet HD 181720 b is named Toge. The name was selected in the NameExoWorlds campaign by Ghana, during the 100th anniversary of the IAU. Toge means earring in the Ewe language.

== See also ==
- HD 5388 b
- HD 190984 b
