= 2MASS J02431371−2453298 =

Brown dwarf in the constellation Fornax

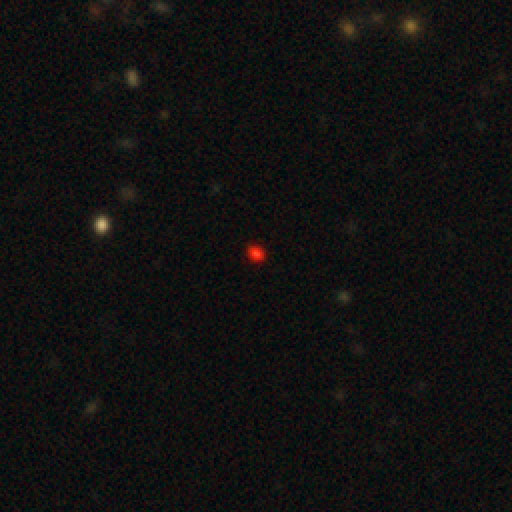
- 2MASS 0243−2453; Credit: legacy surveys

Observation data Epoch J2000 Equinox ICRS
- Constellation: Fornax
- Right ascension: 02^{h} 43^{m} 13.72^{s}
- Declination: −24° 53′ 29.8″

Characteristics
- Spectral type: T6
- Apparent magnitude (J): 15.38 ± 0.05
- Apparent magnitude (H): 15.137 ± 0.109
- Apparent magnitude (K): 15.216 ± 0.168

Astrometry
Proper motion (μ)	RA: −281.34 mas/yr Dec.: −201.55 mas/yr
Parallax (π)	89.07±1.72 mas
Distance	36.6 ± 0.7 ly (11.2 ± 0.2 pc)

Details
Mass	0.024-0.041 M_{☉}
Radius	0.092-0.106 R_{☉}
Temperature	800–1300 K
Age	0.4-1.7 billion years

Other designations
- 2MASSI J0243137−245329; 2MASS 2MASS J02431371−24532982; 2MASSI J0243−2453; 2MASS 2MASS 0243−2453

Database references
SIMBAD	data

2MASS J02431371−2453298 (abbreviated to 2MASS 0243−2453) is a brown dwarf of spectral class T6, located in the constellation Fornax about 36.6 light-years from Earth.

== Discovery ==
2MASS 0243−2453 was discovered in 2002 by Adam J. Burgasser et al. from Two Micron All-Sky Survey (2MASS), conducted from 1997 to 2001. Follow-up observations were made in 1998–2001 using the Near-Infrared Camera, mounted on the Palomar 60 inch (1.5 m) Telescope; CTIO Infrared Imager (CIRIM) and Ohio State Infrared Imager/Spectrometer (OSIRIS), mounted on the Cerro Tololo Inter-American Observatory (CTIO) 1.5 m Telescope; and some additional observations were made using the Near Infrared Camera (NIRC), mounted on the Keck I 10 m telescope, and nearinfrared camera D78, mounted on the Palomar 5 m Hale Telescope. In 2002 Burgasser et al. published a paper, where they defined new spectral subtypes T1–T8, and presented discovery of 11 new T-type brown dwarfs, among which also was 2MASS 0243-2453. These 11 objects were among the earliest T-type brown dwarfs ever discovered: before this, the total number of known T-type objects was 13, and the discoveries increased it up to 24 (apart from additional T-type dwarfs, identified by Geballe et al. 2001 in SDSS data).

== Distance ==
2MASS J02431371−2453298 distance estimates

Source	Parallax, mas	Distance, pc	Distance, ly	Ref.
Vrba et al. (2026)	89.07±1.72	11.23±0.22	36.62±0.71	
Vrba et al. (2004)	93.62±3.63	10.68±0.41	34.84±1.35	
Manjavacas et al. (2018)	93.46±3.49	10.7±0.4	34.9±1.3	

== Properties ==
Using an evolutionary model, the surface temperature of 2MASS 0243−2453 is estimated to be 1040–1100 K, and its mass is estimated at 2.4–4.1% that of the Sun, its diameter 0.092 to 0.106 that of the Sun, and age 0.4–1.7 billion years.

As with other brown dwarfs of spectral type T, its spectrum is dominated by methane. Like many other T-class brown dwarfs, 2MASS J0243−2453 does not exhibit any optical variability, indicating its upper atmosphere is free of clouds.

== See also ==
Other brown dwarfs presented in Burgasser et al. (2002):

- 2MASS 0415−0935 (T8)
- 2MASS 0727+1710 (T7)
- 2MASS 0937+2931 (T6)
