= HD 169830 =

F-type star in the constellation Sagittarius

- Location of HD 169830 (circled in red)

Observation data Epoch J2000.0 Equinox ICRS
- Constellation: Sagittarius
- Right ascension: 18^{h} 27^{m} 49.48500^{s}
- Declination: −29° 49′ 00.7008″
- Apparent magnitude (V): +5.90

Characteristics
- Evolutionary stage: main sequence
- Spectral type: F7V
- B−V color index: 0.517±0.004

Astrometry
| Radial velocity (R_{v}) | −17.271±0.0004 km/s |
| Proper motion (μ) | RA: −0.341 mas/yr Dec.: +16.103 mas/yr |
| Parallax (π) | 27.1461±0.1469 mas |
| Distance | 120.1 ± 0.7 ly (36.8 ± 0.2 pc) |
| Absolute magnitude (M_{V}) | +3.08 |

Details
| Mass | 1.4 M_{☉} |
| Radius | 1.84 R_{☉} |
| Luminosity | 4.63 L_{☉} |
| Surface gravity (log g) | 4.06 cgs |
| Temperature | 6,300±50 K |
| Metallicity [Fe/H] | 0.15 dex |
| Rotation | 8.3 d |
| Rotational velocity (v sin i) | 3.83 km/s |
| Age | 4.95 Gyr |

Other designations
- CD−29°14965, GC 25175, HD 169830, HIP 90485, HR 6907, SAO 186838, GSC 06869-01277, 2MASS J18274949-2949007, Gaia DR2 4048037707717866880

Database references
| SIMBAD | data |
| Exoplanet Archive | data |
| ARICNS | data |

HD 169830 is a star in the southern constellation of Sagittarius. It has a yellow-white hue and is dimly visible to the naked eye with an apparent visual magnitude of +5.90. The star is located at a distance of 120 light-years from the Sun based on parallax. It is drifting closer with a radial velocity of −17.3 km/s, and is predicted to come as close as 20.7 ly (6.4 pc) in 2.08 million years. HD 169830 is known to be orbited by two large Jupiter-like exoplanets.

This is an F-type main-sequence star with a stellar classification of F7V. It is 3.83 billion years old and chromospherically inactive with a slow rotation rate, having a projected rotational velocity of 3.83 km/s. This star is 40% more massive and 84% larger than the Sun. Combining the mass and radius makes the surface gravity only 41% that of the Sun. It is radiating 4.6 times the luminosity of the Sun from its photosphere at an effective temperature of 6,300 K.

A candidate stellar companion, designated component B, lies at an angular separation of 11″ along a position angle of 265°.

== Planetary system ==
On April 15, 2000, the Geneva Extrasolar Planet Search Team announced the discovery of a minimum mass 3 M_{J} planet in a 226-day orbit. Three years later on June 30, 2003, the same team, using the same method, discovered a minimum mass 3.5 M_{J} second planet orbiting the star. In 2022, the inclination and true mass of HD 169830 c were measured via astrometry.

The HD 169830 planetary system
| Companion (in order from star) | Mass | Semimajor axis (AU) | Orbital period (days) | Eccentricity | Inclination (°) | Radius |
|---|---|---|---|---|---|---|
| b | ≥2.956+0.070 −0.069 M_{J} | 0.8130+0.0083 −0.0084 | 225.789+0.074 −0.081 | 0.306+0.012 −0.013 | — | — |
| c | 7.669+1.937 −2.755 M_{J} | 3.075+0.132 −0.146 | 1818.8+5.7 −6.4 | 0.246+0.022 −0.018 | 24.469+12.739 −7.205 | — |

== See also ==
- HD 69830
- List of extrasolar planets
