= 2MASS J04151954−0935066 =

Brown dwarf star in the constellation Eridanus

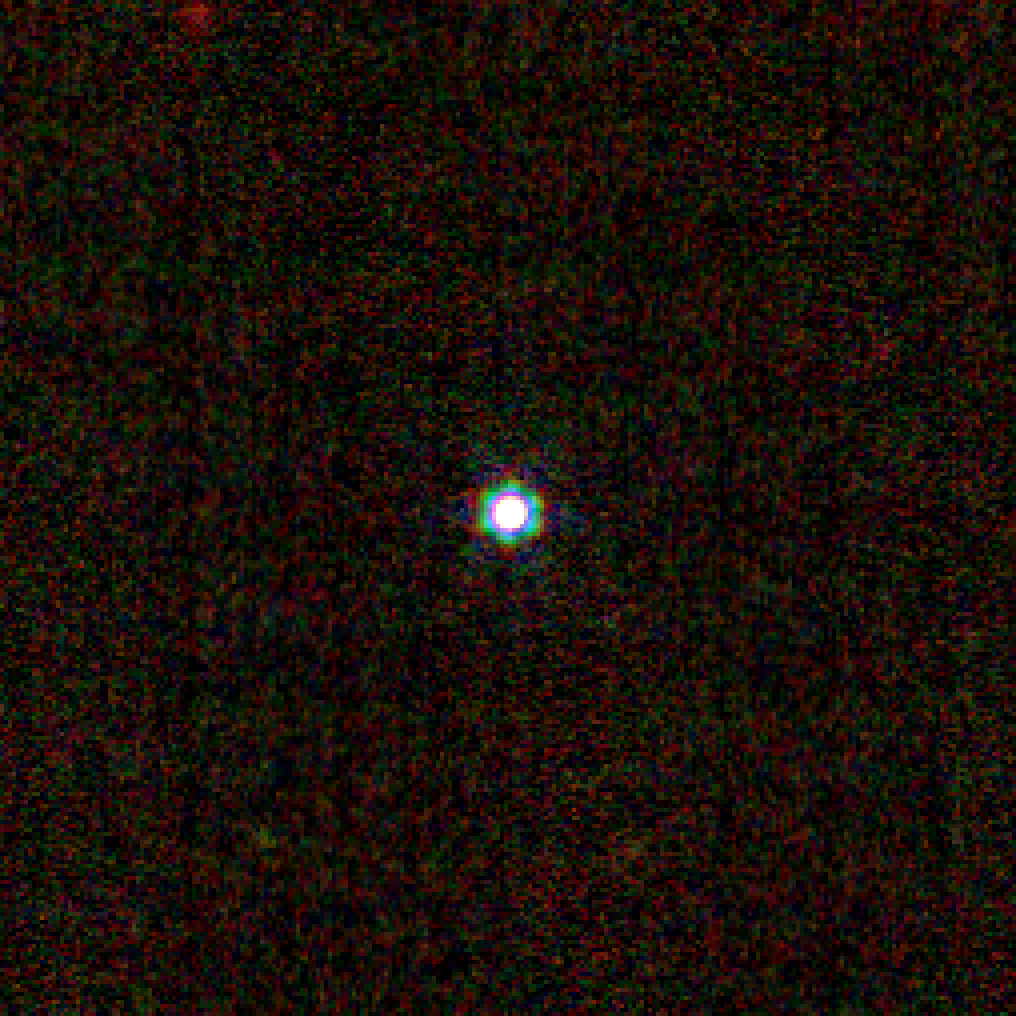
- The brown dwarf 2MASS J04151954−0935066 seen by JWST; Credit: 2MASS

Observation data Epoch J2000 Equinox ICRS
- Constellation: Eridanus
- Right ascension: 04^{h} 15^{m} 19.54^{s}
- Declination: −09° 35′ 06.6″

Characteristics
- Spectral type: T8
- Apparent magnitude (Y): 16.438 ± 0.009
- Apparent magnitude (J): 15.343 ± 0.004
- Apparent magnitude (H): 15.666 ± 0.012
- Apparent magnitude (K_{s}): 15.658 ± 0.023

Astrometry
Proper motion (μ)	RA: 2214.3 ± 1.2 mas/yr Dec.: 535.9 ± 1.2 mas/yr
Parallax (π)	175.2±1.7 mas
Distance	18.6 ± 0.2 ly (5.71 ± 0.06 pc)

Details
Mass	27+7 −5 M_{Jup}
Radius	0.846±0.005 R_{Jup}
Luminosity (bolometric)	10^{−5.719+0.016 −0.018} L_{☉}
Surface gravity (log g)	4.97+0.11 −0.08 cgs
Temperature	728±8 K
Metallicity	0.28±0.02 dex
Age	4-6 Gyr

Other designations
- 2MASS 0415-0935; 2MASSI J0415195−093506; 2MASSW J0415195−093506

Database references
SIMBAD	data
- Location of 2MASS 0415−0935 in the constellation Eridanus

2MASS J04151954−0935066 (also abbreviated to 2MASS 0415−0935) is a brown dwarf of spectral class T8, in the constellation Eridanus about 18.6 light-years from Earth. This is a reference (standard) object for the definition of the T8 spectral class.

== Discovery ==
2MASS 0415−0935 was discovered in 2002 by Adam J. Burgasser et al. from Two Micron All-Sky Survey (2MASS), conducted from 1997 to 2001. Follow-up observations were made in 1998–2001 using the Near-Infrared Camera, mounted on the Palomar 60 inch (1.5 m) Telescope; CTIO Infrared Imager (CIRIM) and Ohio State Infrared Imager/Spectrometer (OSIRIS), mounted on the Cerro Tololo Inter-American Observatory (CTIO) 1.5 m Telescope; and some additional observations were made using the Near Infrared Camera (NIRC), mounted on the Keck I 10 m telescope, and nearinfrared camera D78, mounted on the Palomar 5 m Hale Telescope. In 2002 Burgasser et al. published a paper, where they defined new spectral subtypes T1—T8, and presented discovery of 11 new T-type brown dwarfs, among which also was 2MASS 0415−0935 — object of the latest known by the time spectral type T8. These 11 objects were among the earliest T-type brown dwarfs ever discovered: before this, the total number of known T-type objects was 13, and these discoveries increased it up to 24 (apart from additional T-type dwarfs, identified by Geballe et al. 2001 in SDSS data).

== Distance ==
Currently the most precise distance estimate of 2MASS 0415−0935 is published in 2012 by Dupuy & Liu trigonometric parallax, measured under The Hawaii Infrared Parallax Program: 175.2 ± 1.7 milliseconds of arc, corresponding to a distance 5.71 ± 0.05 pc, or 18.62 ± 0.18 ly. A less precise parallax of this object, measured under U.S. Naval Observatory Infrared Astrometry Program, was published in 2004 by Vrba et al.

== Space motion ==
Position of 2MASS 0415−0935 shifts due to its proper motion by 2.2553 arcseconds per year (2.2782 ± 0.0012 arcsec, according to Dupuy & Liu (2012)).

== Properties ==
2MASS 0415-0935 belongs to the spectral class T8V; its surface temperature is about 750 kelvins. As with other brown dwarfs of spectral type T, its spectrum was thought to be dominated by methane, although by 2015 with the improved spectroscopic database many of the spectral lines were re-assigned to water. The Research Consortium On Nearby Stars (RECONS) estimates the brown dwarf to be 0.03 solar masses.

2MASS 0415-0935 was observed with NIRSpec on JWST. The observation constrained the abundances of water vapor (H_{2}O), methane (CH_{4}), carbon monoxide (CO), carbon dioxide (CO_{2}) and ammonia (NH_{4}). The abundance of hydrogen sulfide (H_{2}S) was less well constrained and phosphine (PH_{3}) was not detected, but an upper limit of its abundance was measured. The ^{12}CO/^{13}CO ratio is 97+9
−8, which is similar for 2MASS J03552337+1133437 and similar to the ratio in the sun. It was shown that the current models of vertical mixing that predict the abundances of different molecules are inconsistent with measured abundances of carbon dioxide. 2MASS 0415-0935 joins a number of T and Y-dwarfs with missing phosphine, such as WISE 0359−5401, requiring a major revision of phosphorus chemistry in brown dwarfs and possibly giant planets.

== See also ==
Other brown dwarfs presented in Burgasser et al. (2002):

- 2MASS 0243−2453 (T6)
- 2MASS 0937+2931 (T6)
