= HD 181720 =

G-type star in the constellation Sagittarius

HD 181720 / Sika
Observation data Epoch J2000.0 Equinox ICRS
- Constellation: Sagittarius
- Right ascension: 19^{h} 22^{m} 52.985^{s}
- Declination: −32° 55′ 08.59″
- Apparent magnitude (V): 7.84

Characteristics
- Evolutionary stage: subgiant
- Spectral type: G1V
- Apparent magnitude (B): 8.44
- Apparent magnitude (J): 6.652±0.019
- Apparent magnitude (H): 6.346±0.029
- Apparent magnitude (K): 6.294±0.034
- B−V color index: 0.599±0.019
- V−R color index: 0.599

Astrometry
Radial velocity (R_{v})	−45.404±0.0006 km/s
Proper motion (μ)	RA: 88.036 mas/yr Dec.: −415.197 mas/yr
Parallax (π)	16.6766±0.0273 mas
Distance	195.6 ± 0.3 ly (59.96 ± 0.10 pc)
Absolute magnitude (M_{V})	4.10

Details
Mass	0.87±0.01 M_{☉}
Radius	1.42±0.02 R_{☉}
Luminosity	2.112±0.003 L_{☉}
Surface gravity (log g)	4.06±0.02 cgs
Temperature	5,781±18 K
Metallicity [Fe/H]	−0.53±0.02 dex
Rotation	47 days
Rotational velocity (v sin i)	1.5 km/s
Age	12.4±0.5 Gyr

Other designations
- Sika, CD−33°14164, HD 181720, HIP 95262, SAO 211218, PPM 298918, LTT 7666, NLTT 47718, GCRV 69331, 2MASS J19225298-3255079

Database references
SIMBAD	data
Exoplanet Archive	data

HD 181720 is star with an orbiting substellar companion in the southern constellation of Sagittarius. It is located at a distance of 196 light-years from the Sun based on parallax measurements, but is drifting closer with a radial velocity of −45.4 km/s. The star has an absolute magnitude of 4.10, but at that distance it has an apparent visual magnitude of 7.84, which is too faint to be seen with the naked eye. It shows a high proper motion, traversing the celestial sphere at an angular rate of 0.444 arcsec/yr.

The spectrum of HD 181720 presents as an ordinary G-type main-sequence star with a stellar classification of G1V. It is an older star with an estimated age of roughly 12 billion years and a minimal level of magnetic activity in its chromosphere. The star has 87% of the mass of the Sun but the radius is now 42% larger than the Sun's. Its metallicity content, as measured by the abundance of iron, is three-tenths as much as in the Sun. HD 181720 is radiating more than double the luminosity of the Sun from its photosphere at an effective temperature of 5,781 K.

The star HD 181720 is named Sika. The name was selected in the NameExoWorlds campaign by Ghana, during the 100th anniversary of the IAU. Sika means gold in the Ewe language.

== Planetary system ==
In 2009, a gas giant planet was found in orbit around the star. It was named "Toge" in 2019. The planets around such metal-poor stars are rare (only two known similar cases are HD 111232 and HD 22781, as of 2019). The upper bound on the mass of this component is 32 times the mass of Jupiter, which would place it in the brown dwarf range.

The HD 181720 planetary system
Companion (in order from star)	Mass	Semimajor axis (AU)	Orbital period (days)	Eccentricity	Inclination (°)	Radius
b (Toge)	≥ 0.37 M_{J}	1.78	956 ± 14	0.26 ± 0.06	—	—

== See also ==
- HD 5388
- HD 190984
- Lists of exoplanets
