= 23 Librae b =

Extrasolar planet in the constellation Libra

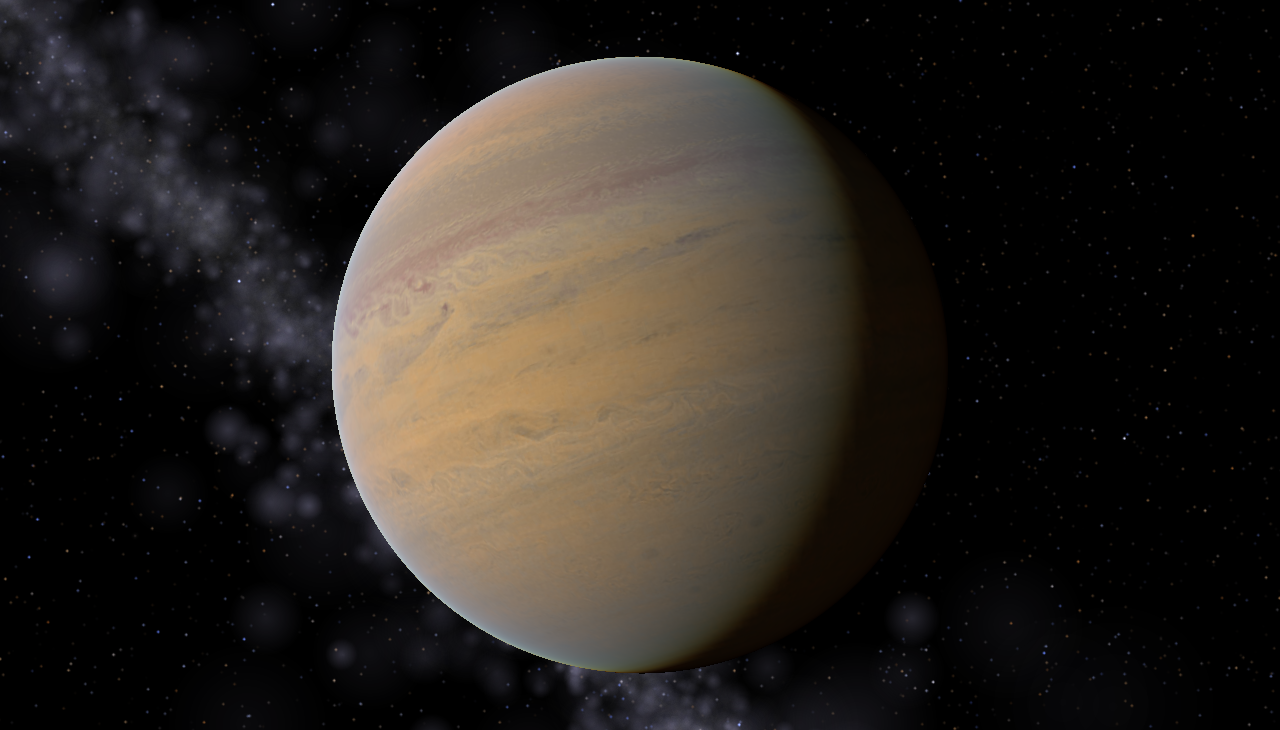
- 23 Librae b (min. mass ~1.59 M_{J}) as seen with Celestia

Discovery
- Discovered by: California and Carnegie Planet Search
- Discovery site: W. M. Keck Observatory
- Discovery date: November 1, 1999
- Detection method: Doppler spectroscopy

Orbital characteristics
- Semi-major axis: 0.81 ± 0.02 AU (121.2 ± 3.0 million km)
- Eccentricity: 0.233 ± 0.002
- Orbital period (sidereal): 258.19 ± 0.07 d 0.7069 y
- Time of periastron: 2,450,331.7 ± 2.2
- Argument of periastron: 358.3 ± 3.7
- Semi-amplitude: 49.52 ± 0.57
- Star: 23 Librae

23 Librae b (23 Lib b), also known as HD 134987 b, is an extrasolar Jovian planet discovered in November 1999 orbiting the star 23 Librae. It orbits in its star's habitable zone.

As of 1999, the planet was known to have at least 1.5 times Jupiter's mass. The planet orbits 23 Librae at an average distance of 0.82 AU, which is between that of Venus and the Earth in the Solar System.

== See also ==
- List of exoplanets discovered before 2000
