= HD 169830 b =

Gas giant orbiting HD 169830

Discovery
- Discovered by: Mayor, Udry et al.
- Discovery site: France
- Discovery date: April 15, 2000
- Detection method: Radial velocity

Orbital characteristics
- Semi-major axis: 0.818 AU (122,400,000 km)
- Eccentricity: 0.332 ± 0.03
- Orbital period (sidereal): 226.01 ± 0.23 d
- Time of periastron: 2,451,923 ± 1
- Argument of periastron: 148 ± 2
- Semi-amplitude: 80.7 ± 0.9
- Star: HD 169830

HD 169830 b is an extrasolar planet three times the mass of Jupiter. Due to its high mass, it is most likely a gas giant planet, akin to Jupiter and Saturn in the Solar System. This planet at 0.8 AU is slightly farther out than Venus is in the Solar System, orbiting around its star every 262 days.

== See also ==
- HD 169830 c
