= HD 142022 =

Binary star system in the constellation Octans

Observation data Epoch J2000 Equinox ICRS
- Constellation: Octans
- Right ascension: 16^{h} 10^{m} 15.02895^{s}
- Declination: −84° 13′ 53.8108″
- Apparent magnitude (V): 7.70 + 11.19

Characteristics
- Spectral type: G9IV-V + M1V
- B−V color index: 0.79±0.01

Astrometry
Radial velocity (R_{v})	−9.96±0.13 km/s
Proper motion (μ)	RA: −337.270 mas/yr Dec.: −31.386 mas/yr
Parallax (π)	29.1991±0.0172 mas
Distance	111.70 ± 0.07 ly (34.25 ± 0.02 pc)
Absolute magnitude (M_{V})	5.02

Details

A
Mass	0.972+0.036 −0.029 M_{☉}
Radius	1.028+0.011 −0.012 R_{☉}
Luminosity	0.886±0.001 L_{☉}
Surface gravity (log g)	4.386±0.251 cgs
Temperature	5,516±31 K
Metallicity [Fe/H]	0.24±0.073 dex
Rotational velocity (v sin i)	2.048±0.214 km/s
Age	7.667+1.704 −1.764 Gyr

B
Mass	0.60±0.07 M_{☉}
Radius	0.56±0.05 R_{☉}
Luminosity	0.063±0.014 L_{☉}
Temperature	3,892±95 K

Other designations
- CD−83°202, GC 21507, GJ 606.1, GJ 9536, HD 142022, HIP 79242, SAO 258738, LTT 6382, GCRV 65757

Database references
SIMBAD	data

HD 142022 is a binary star system located in the southernmost constellation of Octans. It is too faint to be visible to the naked eye, having an apparent visual magnitude of 7.70. The distance to this system is 112 light-years (34 parsecs) based on parallax, but it is drifting closer to the Sun with a radial velocity of −10 km/s.

The primary, designated component A, is an old, Population I G-type star with a stellar classification of G9IV-V, showing a spectrum with mixed traits of a main sequence and a subgiant star. It is an estimated 7.6 billion years old and is spinning with a projected rotational velocity of 2 km/s. The star has similar mass and dimensions as the Sun, but has a 55% higher metallicity. It is radiating 89% of the luminosity of the Sun from its photosphere at an effective temperature of 5516 K.

The magnitude 11.19 companion has the designation LTT 6384 and appears gravitationally bound to the primary. The pair have an angular separation of 22 arcseconds, which corresponds to a projected separation of ~820 AU. The estimated semimajor axis of their orbit is 1,033 AU. The secondary is a red dwarf star with a stellar classification of M1V.

The primary star has a single known planetary companion, HD 142022 Ab, discovered in 2005. In 2023, the inclination and true mass of HD 142022 Ab were determined via astrometry.

The HD 142022 planetary system
Companion (in order from star)	Mass	Semimajor axis (AU)	Orbital period (years)	Eccentricity	Inclination (°)	Radius
b	4.51+0.91 −0.61 M_{J}	2.939±0.062	5.297+0.082 −0.073	0.506+0.071 −0.06	71±13 or 109±13	—

== See also ==
- HD 141937
- HD 142415
- List of extrasolar planets
