= 2MASS J05325346+8246465 =

Star in the constellation Camelopardalis

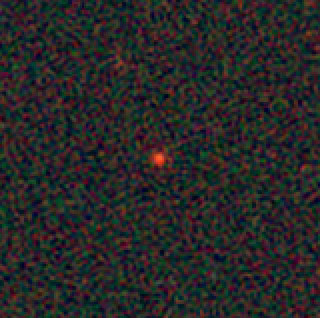
- 2MASS J0532+8246; Credit: SDSS

Observation data Epoch J2000 Equinox ICRS
- Constellation: Camelopardalis
- Right ascension: 05^{h} 32^{m} 54.4345^{s}
- Declination: +82° 46′ 45.161″

Characteristics
- Spectral type: esdL8:

Astrometry
Radial velocity (R_{v})	−172±1 km/s
Proper motion (μ)	RA: 2038.794(561) mas/yr Dec.: −1662.958(484) mas/yr
Parallax (π)	40.7097±0.4597 mas
Distance	80.1 ± 0.9 ly (24.6 ± 0.3 pc)

Details
Mass	0.077–0.085 M_{☉}
Temperature	1600 K
Metallicity [Fe/H]	−1.6 dex
Rotational velocity (v sin i)	65 ±15 km/s
Age	~10 Gyr

Other designations
- 2MASS J05325346+8246465, 2MASS 0532+8246

Database references
SIMBAD	data

2MASS J05325346+8246465 (abbreviated 2MASS J0532+8246) is possibly the first brown dwarf observed in the galactic halo of the Milky Way, and the first known substellar subdwarf star. It was discovered by Adam Burgasser et al. in 2003 from Two Micron All-Sky Survey data, and verified by observations at Palomar Observatory and W. M. Keck Observatory. It has a low metallicity, which indicates it is an old star.

The mass and temperature of 2MASS 0532+8246 makes it a rare object in stellar-substellar gap between conventional stars and brown dwarfs. It produces roughly half of its luminosity from hydrogen fusion. Such "gap" objects, covering a narrow range of masses but a wide range of temperatures, and powered by unsteady hydrogen fusion, are exotic but expected to be more common among low-metallicity objects like 2MASS J05325346+8246465.

In 2008 it was discovered that this object is on a retrograde galactic orbit that is both eccentric and extends well away from the plane, making this object a member of the galactic halo. In 2024 this object was identified as a possible member of the Thamnos populations, together with the T subdwarf CWISE J113010.07+313944.7. Thamnos has two substructures called Thamnos 1 and Thamnos 2, both were identified in 2019 from Gaia data. Thamnos is likely the remnant of a dwarf galaxy that was accreted into the Milky Way and consists of metal-poor stars that formed between 8 and 12.89 billion years ago.
