= HD 22781 =

Star in the constellation Perseus

Observation data Epoch J2000 Equinox J2000
- Constellation: Perseus
- Right ascension: 03^{h} 40^{m} 49.5246^{s}
- Declination: +31° 49′ 34.649″
- Apparent magnitude (V): 8.78

Characteristics
- Evolutionary stage: main-sequence star
- Spectral type: K0

Astrometry
Radial velocity (R_{v})	8.26 km/s
Proper motion (μ)	RA: 40.576 mas/yr Dec.: −94.254 mas/yr
Parallax (π)	30.6433±0.1071 mas
Distance	106.4 ± 0.4 ly (32.6 ± 0.1 pc)
Absolute magnitude (M_{V})	+6.21

Details
Mass	0.75±0.02 M_{☉}
Radius	0.70±0.02 R_{☉}
Surface gravity (log g)	4.57±0.04 cgs
Temperature	5175±15 K
Metallicity [Fe/H]	−0.35±0.02 dex
Rotational velocity (v sin i)	1.73 km/s
Age	4.14±3.63 Gyr

Other designations
- BD+31 630, HD 22781, HIP 17187, TYC 2355-246-1, GSC 02355-00246, 2MASS J03404953+3149345, Gaia DR2 217334764042444288

Database references
SIMBAD	data

HD 22781, is a single star about 106 light-years away. It is a K-type main-sequence star. The star's age is poorly constrained at 4.14±3.63 billion years, but is likely similar to that of the Sun. HD 22781 is heavily depleted in heavy elements, having just 45% of Sun's concentration of iron, yet is comparatively rich in carbon, having 90% of Sun's abundance.

An imaging survey in 2012 has failed to find any stellar companions, suggesting HD 22781 is a single star.

== Planetary system ==
In 2011 a transiting superjovian planet or brown dwarf b was detected on an extremely eccentric orbit. It is located just outside of the conservative habitable zone of the parent star. Planets around such metal-poor stars are rare; the only three known similar cases are HD 111232 and HD 181720.

In 2012, a radial velocity data review indicated there are no additional giant planets in the system.

The HD 22781 planetary system
Companion (in order from star)	Mass	Semimajor axis (AU)	Orbital period (days)	Eccentricity	Inclination	Radius
b	≥13.65±0.97 M_{J}	1.167±0.039	528.07±0.14	0.8191±0.0023	—	—
