= 23 Librae =

Star in the constellation Libra

- Location of 23 Librae (circled in red)

Observation data Epoch J2000 Equinox ICRS
- Constellation: Libra
- Right ascension: 15^{h} 13^{m} 28.6669^{s}
- Declination: −25° 18′ 33.6534″
- Apparent magnitude (V): 6.45

Characteristics
- Spectral type: G5 V
- B−V color index: +0.70

Astrometry
Radial velocity (R_{v})	+5.14±0.12 km/s
Proper motion (μ)	RA: −400.147(26) mas/yr Dec.: −75.253(27) mas/yr
Parallax (π)	38.1946±0.0370 mas
Distance	85.39 ± 0.08 ly (26.18 ± 0.03 pc)

Details
Mass	1.12+0.01 −0.02 M_{☉}
Radius	1.25±0.04 R_{☉}
Surface gravity (log g)	4.30±0.02 cgs
Temperature	5,762±9 K
Metallicity [Fe/H]	0.290±0.009 dex
Rotational velocity (v sin i)	2.17 km/s
Age	5.00+0.28 −0.25 Gyr

Other designations
- 23 Lib, CD−24°11928, GJ 579.4, HD 134987, HIP 74500, HR 5657, SAO 183275

Database references
SIMBAD	data
Exoplanet Archive	data

23 Librae (23 Lib) is a solar analog star located 85 light-years away in the zodiac constellation Libra, making it visible from most of the Earth's surface. With an apparent visual magnitude of 6.45, it requires dark skies and good seeing conditions to see with the naked eye. Two extrasolar planets are known to orbit 23 Librae, designated 23 Librae b and c respectively.

== Properties ==
23 Librae has a spectral type of G5 V, indicating that this is a main sequence star that is generating energy through the thermonuclear fusion of hydrogen at its core. This energy is being radiated from the outer envelope at an effective temperature of about 5,762 K, giving it the yellow hue typical of G-type stars. Its age is estimated at 5.00 billion years. Based upon parallax measurements, this star is located at a distance of 85 light-years (26 parsecs) from the Earth.

23 Librae is slightly larger than the Sun, with an estimated 112% of the Sun's mass and 125% of the Sun's radius. It is a metal-rich star with an abundance of elements heavier than helium, its iron content being 70% greater than the solar amount. It appears to be rotating slowly, with the projected rotational velocity of 2.2 km∙s^{−1} giving a lower bound to the actual azimuthal velocity along the equator.

== Planetary system ==
In November 1999 an exoplanet 23 Librae b was announced orbiting 23 Librae, and in 2009 an additional planet was detected. Examination of the system in the infrared using the Spitzer Space Telescope did not reveal any excess emission, which might otherwise suggest the presence of a circumstellar debris disk of orbiting dust.

The 23 Librae planetary system
Companion (in order from star)	Mass	Semimajor axis (AU)	Orbital period (days)	Eccentricity	Inclination (°)	Radius
b	1.8+1.2 −0.2 M_{J}	0.82±0.01	258.25±0.025	0.25±0.02	—	—
c	1.9+0.5 −0.4 M_{J}	10±1	6348+71 −53	0.15±0.05	—	—

== In popular culture ==
In the Halo franchise, the star system is home to the planets Hesiod, farther away from the star, and Madrigal in the habitable zone.
