= 23 Librae c =

Extrasolar planet

Discovery
- Discovered by: Jones et al.
- Discovery site: Keck Observatory
- Discovery date: December 14, 2009
- Detection method: Radial velocity

Orbital characteristics
- Apastron: 6.5 AU (970,000,000 km)
- Periastron: 5.1 AU (760,000,000 km)
- Semi-major axis: 5.8 ± 0.5 AU (868,000,000 ± 75,000,000 km)
- Eccentricity: 0.12 ± 0.02
- Orbital period (sidereal): 5000 ± 400 d 14 ± 1 y
- Time of periastron: 2,461,100 ± 600
- Argument of periastron: 195 ± 48
- Star: 23 Librae

23 Librae c (23 Lib c) is an extrasolar planet like Jupiter discovered in 2009 orbiting the star 23 Librae. It has one of the longest known orbits of a planet detected via radial velocity. The actual orbital period of this planet range from 4600 to 5400 days (from 12.5 to 15 years). The reason the error range for orbital period is so large is because this planet did not complete the orbit during the time of continuous observations. Using the range of orbital periods, this planet's average distance would sit between 5.3 and 6.3 AU.
