= HD 65216 =

Triple star-system in the constellation Carina

Observation data Epoch J2000.0 Equinox ICRS
- Constellation: Carina
- A
- Right ascension: 07^{h} 53^{m} 41.3196^{s}
- Declination: −63° 38′ 50.353″
- Apparent magnitude (V): 7.97
- B
- Right ascension: 07^{h} 53^{m} 42.3964^{s}
- Declination: −63° 38′ 50.182″
- Apparent magnitude (V): 18.58

Characteristics
- Evolutionary stage: main sequence
- Spectral type: G5V + M7–8 + L2–3
- B−V color index: 0.672±0.012

Astrometry

A
| Radial velocity (R_{v}) | 42.58±0.12 km/s |
| Proper motion (μ) | RA: −123.740±0.029 mas/yr Dec.: +146.602±0.023 mas/yr |
| Parallax (π) | 28.4419±0.0181 mas |
| Distance | 114.67 ± 0.07 ly (35.16 ± 0.02 pc) |
| Absolute magnitude (M_{V}) | 5.22 |

B
| Proper motion (μ) | RA: −119.227 mas/yr Dec.: +134.271 mas/yr |
| Parallax (π) | 27.7827±0.1542 mas |
| Distance | 117.4 ± 0.7 ly (36.0 ± 0.2 pc) |

Details

HD 65216 A
| Mass | 0.95±0.01 M_{☉} |
| Radius | 0.864±0.003 R_{☉} |
| Luminosity | 0.716±0.001 L_{☉} |
| Surface gravity (log g) | 4.53±0.01 cgs |
| Temperature | 5,718±8 K |
| Metallicity [Fe/H] | −0.17 dex |
| Rotational velocity (v sin i) | 1.308 km/s |
| Age | 1.7±0.5 Gyr |

Ba
| Mass | 0.09 M_{☉} |

Bb
| Mass | 0.08 M_{☉} |

Other designations
- CD−63°359, HD 65216, HIP 38558, SAO 250002, WDS J07537-6339A

Database references
| SIMBAD | data |

HD 65216 is a triple star system with two exoplanetary companions in the southern constellation of Carina. With an apparent visual magnitude of 7.97 it cannot be readily seen without technical aid, but with binoculars or telescope it should be visible. The system is located at a distance of 114.7 light-years from the Sun based on parallax measurements, and is drifting further away with a radial velocity of 42.6 km/s.

== Stellar system ==
The primary of HD 65216, component A, is an ordinary G-type main-sequence star with a stellar classification of G5V. It is nearly two billion years old and is spinning with a projected rotational velocity of 1.3 km/s. The star has 95% of the mass and 86% of the radius of the Sun. It is radiating 72% of the luminosity of the Sun from its photosphere at an effective temperature of 5,718 K.

In 2008 a co-moving binary system of low mass companions were discovered at an angular separation of 7″ from the primary, which is equivalent to a projected separation of 253 AU at the distance of HD 65216. Component B is of class M7–8 (0.089 M_{☉}) while component C is class L2–3 (0.078 M_{☉}); both have a mass close to the sub-stellar limit. The pair have a projected separation of 6 AU from each other.

== Planetary system ==
An extrasolar planet (designated as HD 65216 b) was discovered orbiting the primary in 2003. A second much more distant planet was suspected since 2013, but was discovered on a completely different orbit in 2019.

In 2026, astrometric data from the Hipparcos and Gaia spacecraft measured the inclination and true mass of planet c, yielding a mass of 3.32+1.40
−1.16 M_{J}. The inclination could be either prograde or retrograde, at 35.6+24.5
−10.8 ° or 147.1+10.9
−24.3 °. Assuming a coplanar architecture for the planets, a mass of 2.23+0.96
−0.77 M_{J} for planet b is obtained.

The HD 65216 planetary system
| Companion (in order from star) | Mass | Semimajor axis (AU) | Orbital period (days) | Eccentricity | Inclination (°) | Radius |
|---|---|---|---|---|---|---|
| b | 2.23+0.96 −0.77 M_{J} | 1.31±0.00 | 577.9±0.5 | 0.25+0.04 −0.03 | 35.6+24.5 −10.8, 147.1+10.9 −24.3 | — |
| c | 3.32+1.40 −1.16 M_{J} | 6.92+0.13 −0.11 | 7007+192 −161 | 0.42±0.05 | 35.6+24.5 −10.8, 147.1+10.9 −24.3 | — |

== See also ==
- List of extrasolar planets
