= HD 5388 =

Star in the constellation Phoenix

Observation data Epoch J2000.0 Equinox ICRS
- Constellation: Phoenix
- Right ascension: 00^{h} 55^{m} 11.88996^{s}
- Declination: −47° 24′ 21.4772″
- Apparent magnitude (V): 6.73

Characteristics
- Evolutionary stage: main sequence
- Spectral type: F6V
- Apparent magnitude (B): 7.73
- Apparent magnitude (J): 5.795
- Apparent magnitude (H): 5.524
- Apparent magnitude (K): 5.441
- B−V color index: 0.500

Astrometry
Radial velocity (R_{v})	+39.46±0.12 km/s
Proper motion (μ)	RA: −80.390 mas/yr Dec.: −178.083 mas/yr
Parallax (π)	18.8432±0.0199 mas
Distance	173.1 ± 0.2 ly (53.07 ± 0.06 pc)
Absolute magnitude (M_{V})	3.10

Details
Mass	1.21 M_{☉}
Radius	1.87+0.03 −0.04 R_{☉}
Luminosity	4.770+0.012 −0.011 L_{☉}
Surface gravity (log g)	4.28±0.06 cgs
Temperature	6,297±32 K
Metallicity [Fe/H]	−0.27±0.02 dex
Rotation	23 days
Rotational velocity (v sin i)	4.2 km/s
Age	5.5±0.5 Gyr

Other designations
- 78 G. Phoenicis, CD−48°216, HD 5388, HIP 4311, SAO 215291, PPM 305379, LTT 4311, NLTT 3057

Database references
SIMBAD	data

HD 5388 is a single star in the southern constellation of Phoenix. It has the Gould designation 78 G. Phoenicis, while HD 5388 is the star's Henry Draper Catalogue identifier. This object has a yellow-white hue and is too faint to be readily visible to average human eyesight, having an apparent visual magnitude of 6.73. It is located at a distance of 173 light-years from the Sun based on parallax, and is drifting further away with a radial velocity of +39 km/s.

This object is an ordinary F-type main-sequence star with a stellar classification of F6V, indicating that it is generating energy through core hydrogen fusion. It is not chromospherically active and its metal content is half as much as the Sun. The star is larger and more massive than the Sun, and radiates 4.8 times the Sun's luminosity from its photosphere at an effective temperature of 6297 K.

In 2009, a substellar object (HD 5388 b) was detected in orbit around the star using the HARPS instrument at La Silla Observatory. Its minimum mass is consistent with a gas giant planet, and it has an elliptical orbit with a period of 2.13 years. Later astrometric observations suggested that this object is a massive brown dwarf in a nearly face-on orbit rather than a planet, but a more recent astrometric study in 2026 found a much smaller true mass, again consistent with a planet.

The HD 5388 planetary system
Companion (in order from star)	Mass	Semimajor axis (AU)	Orbital period (days)	Eccentricity	Inclination (°)	Radius
b	3.2+0.3 −0.2 M_{J}	1.757±0.001	772.5±1.0	0.41±0.02	38.7+10.2 −6.8	—

== See also ==
- HD 181720
- HD 190984
