= HD 142415 =

Star in the constellation Norma

Observation data Epoch J2000 Equinox ICRS
- Constellation: Norma
- Right ascension: 15^{h} 57^{m} 40.79193^{s}
- Declination: −60° 12′ 00.9221″
- Apparent magnitude (V): 7.33

Characteristics
- Evolutionary stage: main sequence
- Spectral type: G1V
- B−V color index: 0.621±0.002

Astrometry
Radial velocity (R_{v})	−11.60±0.72 km/s
Proper motion (μ)	RA: −112.830±0.022 mas/yr Dec.: −101.883±0.022 mas/yr
Parallax (π)	28.2066±0.0193 mas
Distance	115.63 ± 0.08 ly (35.45 ± 0.02 pc)
Absolute magnitude (M_{V})	4.66

Details
Mass	1.10±0.01 M_{☉}
Radius	1.04±0.01 R_{☉}
Luminosity	1.16±0.02 L_{☉}
Surface gravity (log g)	4.52±0.05 cgs
Temperature	5,869±12 K
Metallicity [Fe/H]	0.17±0.02 dex
Rotation	9.6 d
Rotational velocity (v sin i)	4.2±0.1 km/s
Age	1.6±0.6 Gyr

Other designations
- CPD−59°6464, GC 21393, HD 142415, HIP 78169, SAO 253358

Database references
SIMBAD	data

HD 142415 is a single star in the southern constellation of Norma, positioned next to the southern constellation border with Triangulum Australe and less than a degree to the west of NGC 6025. With an apparent visual magnitude of 7.33, it is too faint to be visible to the naked eye. The distance to this star is 116 light years from the Sun based on parallax, but it is drifting closer with a radial velocity of −12 km/s. It is a candidate member of the NGC 1901 open cluster of stars.

This is an ordinary G-type main-sequence star with a stellar classification of G1V. It has been identified as a solar twin by Datson et al. (2012), which means its physical properties are very similar to the Sun. It has 10% more mass than the Sun but only a 3% larger radius. The star is estimated to be 1.6 billion years old and is spinning with a projected rotational velocity of 4.2 km/s. It is radiating 1.16 times the luminosity of the Sun from its photosphere at an effective temperature of 5,869 K.

The star is currently known to have one planet, designated HD 142415 b. This was detected via the radial velocity method and announced in 2004. The orbital period is just over a year, which made a determination of the orbital eccentricity more difficult due to undersampling over part of the orbit, in combination with jitter. The authors chose to pin the eccentricity value to 0.5, although solutions in the range 0.2–0.8 would be equally plausible.

The HD 142415 planetary system
Companion (in order from star)	Mass	Semimajor axis (AU)	Orbital period (days)	Eccentricity	Inclination (°)	Radius
b	>1.62 M_{J}	1.05	386.3 ± 1.6	0.5(fixed)	—	—

== See also ==
- HD 141937
- HD 142022
- List of extrasolar planets
