= HE 1256−2738 =

Subdwarf

Observation data Epoch J2000 Equinox J2000
- Constellation: Hydra
- Right ascension: +12^{h} 59^{m} 01.44^{s}
- Declination: −27° 54′ 18.5″
- Apparent magnitude (V): 16.46
| Distance | 1000 ly (310 pc) |
| Spectral type | sdOB |

Other designations
- HE 1256−2738, EC 12563-2738, USNO-B1.0 0620-00338249

Database references
| SIMBAD | data |

HE 1256−2738 is a subdwarf located approximately 1,000 light years away in the constellation Hydra, with a surface temperature of approximately 38,000 °C (68,400 °F). Along with stars HE 2359−2844 and LS IV-14 116, HE 1256−2738 forms a new group of star called heavy metal subdwarfs.
