= HD 111232 =

Star in the constellation Musca

Observation data Epoch J2000 Equinox ICRS
- Constellation: Musca
- Right ascension: 12^{h} 48^{m} 51.75256^{s}
- Declination: −68° 25′ 30.5548″
- Apparent magnitude (V): 7.59

Characteristics
- Evolutionary stage: main sequence
- Spectral type: G8 V Fe-1.0
- B−V color index: 0.701±0.003

Astrometry
Radial velocity (R_{v})	104.53±0.13 km/s
Proper motion (μ)	RA: 27.283±0.021 mas/yr Dec.: 112.918±0.024 mas/yr
Parallax (π)	34.6094±0.0239 mas
Distance	94.24 ± 0.07 ly (28.89 ± 0.02 pc)
Absolute magnitude (M_{V})	5.25

Details
Mass	0.80±0.02 M_{☉}
Radius	0.88±0.01 R_{☉}
Luminosity	0.700±0.003 L_{☉}
Surface gravity (log g)	4.45±0.02 cgs
Temperature	5,648±30 K
Metallicity [Fe/H]	−0.32 dex
Rotation	30.7 d
Rotational velocity (v sin i)	0.421 km/s
Age	11.7±1.4 Gyr

Other designations
- CPD−67°2079, HD 111232, HIP 62534, 2MASS J12485177-6825304, Gaia DR2 5855730584310531200

Database references
SIMBAD	data

HD 111232 is a star in the southern constellation of Musca. It is too faint to be visible with the naked eye, having an apparent visual magnitude of 7.59. The distance to this star is 94.5 light years based on parallax. It is drifting away from the Sun with a radial velocity of +104 km/s, having come to within 14.1 light-years some 264,700 years ago. The absolute magnitude of this star is 5.25, indicating it would have been visible to the naked eye at that time.

This is an ancient, thick disk population II star with an estimated age of twelve billion years. It is a G-type main-sequence star with a stellar classification of G8 V Fe-1.0, indicating an anomalous underabundance of iron in the stellar atmosphere. The star has 80% of the mass of the Sun and 88% of the Sun's radius. It is spinning slowly with a projected rotational velocity of 0.4 km/s. X-ray emission has not been detected, suggesting a low level of coronal activity. The star is radiating 70% of the luminosity of the Sun from its photosphere at an effective temperature of 5,648 K.

== Planetary system ==
A superjovian planetary companion was detected by the CORALIE team, based on observations beginning in 2003. Planets around such metal-poor stars are rare (the only two known similar cases as of 2019 are HD 22781 and HD 181720). An astrometric measurement of the planet's inclination and true mass was published in 2022 as part of Gaia DR3. Later in 2022, these parameters were revised along with the detection of a second substellar companion, likely a brown dwarf.

The HD 111232 planetary system
Companion (in order from star)	Mass	Semimajor axis (AU)	Orbital period (years)	Eccentricity	Inclination (°)	Radius
b	7.965+1.128 −0.479 M_{J}	2.148+0.088 −0.097	3.201+0.002 −0.001	0.214+0.005 −0.003	93.521+16.622 −18.063	—
c	18.063+4.209 −1.612 M_{J}	17.250+2.158 −2.151	72.478+14.115 −12.341	0.558+0.027 −0.028	87.902+13.916 −22.591	—
