= 2MASS J09373487+2931409 =

T-type brown dwarf in the constellation Leo

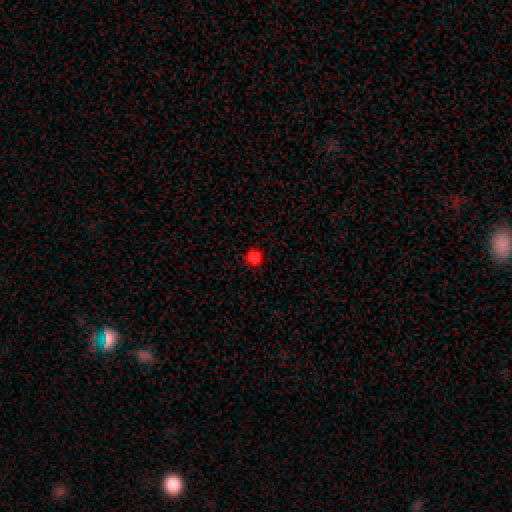
- 2MASS 0937+2931; Credit: legacy surveys

Observation data Epoch J2000 Equinox ICRS
- Constellation: Leo
- Right ascension: 09^{h} 37^{m} 34.8797^{s}
- Declination: +29° 31′ 40.991″

Characteristics
- Spectral type: T6p
- Apparent magnitude (J): 14.648±0.036
- Apparent magnitude (H): 14.703±0.068
- Apparent magnitude (K): 15.267±0.130

Astrometry
Proper motion (μ)	RA: +941.6 mas/yr Dec.: −1324 mas/yr
Parallax (π)	167.19±1.22 mas
Distance	19.5 ± 0.1 ly (5.98 ± 0.04 pc)

Details
Mass	42±26 M_{Jup}
Radius	0.94±0.16 R_{Jup}
Luminosity	0.000005 L_{☉}
Surface gravity (log g)	4.97±0.48 cgs
Temperature	881±74 K

Other designations
- 2MASS J09373487+2931409; 2MASSI J0937347+293142; 2MASS 0937+2931

Database references
SIMBAD	data
- Location of 2MASS 0937+2931 in the constellation Leo

2MASS J09373487+2931409, or 2MASSI J0937347+293142 (abbreviated to 2MASS 0937+2931) is a brown dwarf of spectral class T6, located in the constellation Leo about 19.96 light-years from Earth.

== Discovery ==
2MASS 0937+2931 was discovered in 2002 by Adam J. Burgasser et al. from Two Micron All-Sky Survey (2MASS), conducted from 1997 to 2001. Follow-up observations were made in 1998–2001 using the Near-Infrared Camera, mounted on the Palomar 60 inch (1.5 m) Telescope; CTIO Infrared Imager (CIRIM) and Ohio State Infrared Imager/Spectrometer (OSIRIS), mounted on the Cerro Tololo Inter-American Observatory (CTIO) 1.5 m Telescope; and some additional observations were made using the Near Infrared Camera (NIRC), mounted on the Keck I 10 m telescope, and nearinfrared camera D78, mounted on the Palomar 5 m Hale Telescope. In 2002 Burgasser et al. published a paper, where they defined new spectral subtypes T1—T8, and presented discovery of 11 new T-type brown dwarfs, among which also was 2MASS 0937+2931. This 11 objects were among the earliest T-type brown dwarfs ever discovered: before this, the total number of known T-type objects was 13, and this discoveries increased it up to 24 (apart from additional T-type dwarfs, identified by Geballe et al. 2001 in SDSS data).

== Properties ==
Currently the most precise distance estimate of 2MASS 0937+2931 is a trigonometric parallax, published in 2026 by Vrba et al.: 167.19±1.22 mas, corresponding to a distance of 19.50 ± 0.13 light-years (5.98 ± 0.04 parsecs).

2MASS 0937+2931 has an unusual spectrum, indicating a metal-poor atmosphere and/or a high surface gravity (high pressure at the surface). Its effective temperature is estimated at 800 Kelvin. The Research Consortium On Nearby Stars (RECONS) estimates the brown dwarf to be 0.03 solar masses. No optical variability was detected as in 2014.

== See also ==
- List of stars in Leo

Other brown dwarfs presented in Burgasser et al. (2002):

- 2MASS 0243-2453 (T6)
- 2MASS 0415-0935 (T8)
- 2MASS 0727+1710 (T7)
