= HE 2359−2844 =

Star in the constellation of Sculptor

Observation data Epoch J2000 Equinox J2000
- Constellation: Sculptor
- Right ascension: +00^{h} 01^{m} 38.4850^{s}
- Declination: −28° 27′ 43.034″
- Apparent magnitude (V): 16.14
Distance	800 ly (250 pc)
Spectral type	sdO7 He2

Other designations
- HE 2359−2844, CTLGM 5978, MCT 2359-2844, PHL 629, Ton S 133

Database references
SIMBAD	data

HE 2359−2844 is a subdwarf located approximately 800 light years away in the constellation Sculptor, with a surface temperature of approximately 38,000 °C (68,400 °F). Along with stars HE 1256−2738 and LS IV-14 116, HE 2359−2844 forms a new group of star called heavy metal subdwarfs.

HE 2359−2844 contains very high levels of lead - 10,000 times more than the Sun. It also contains 10,000 times more yttrium and zirconium than the Sun. It is suggested that there is a lead layer above the star that is 100 km (62 mi) thick and that contains 100 billion tonnes of lead. Dr. Naslim Neelamkodan explained that "the heavy-metal stars are a crucial link between bright red giants, stars thirty or forty times the size of the Sun, and faint blue subdwarfs, stars one fifth the size, but seven times hotter and seventy times brighter than the Sun."
