= Subdwarf =

Star of luminosity class VI under the Yerkes spectral classification system

A subdwarf, sometimes denoted by "sd", is a star with luminosity class VI under the Yerkes spectral classification system. They are defined as stars with luminosity 1.5 to 2 magnitudes lower than that of main-sequence stars of the same spectral type. On a Hertzsprung–Russell diagram subdwarfs appear to lie below the main sequence. (Note: Hot subdwarfs are as yet fairly rarely seen stars, and their place on the HR diagram at present is usually unmarked. Their place would be a streak lower than the main sequence, under the label "sequence" on the HR diagram at the right.)

The term "subdwarf" was coined by Gerard Kuiper in 1939, to refer to a series of stars with anomalous spectra that were previously labeled as "intermediate white dwarfs".

Since Kuiper coined the term, the subdwarf type has been extended to lower-mass stars than were known at the time. Astronomers have also discovered an entirely different group of blue-white subdwarfs, making two distinct categories:

- Cool subdwarfs
- Hot subdwarfs

== Cool (red) subdwarfs ==
Like ordinary main-sequence stars, cool subdwarfs (of spectral types G to M) produce their energy from hydrogen fusion. The explanation of their underluminosity lies in their low metallicity: These stars are not enriched in elements heavier than helium. The lower metallicity decreases the opacity of their outer layers and decreases the radiation pressure, resulting in a smaller, hotter star for a given mass. This lower opacity also allows them to emit a higher percentage of ultraviolet light for the same spectral type relative to a Population I star, a feature known as ultraviolet excess. Usually members of the Milky Way's halo, they frequently have high space velocities relative to the Sun.

Cool subdwarfs of spectral type L and T exist, such as ULAS J131610.28+075553.0 with spectral type sdT6.5.

Subclasses of cool subdwarfs are as following:

cool subdwarf
Examples: Kapteyn's Star (sdM1), GJ 1062 (sdM2.5)
extreme subdwarf
Example: APMPM J0559-2903 (esdM7)
ultrasubdwarf
Example: LSPM J0822+1700 (usdM7.5)

=== Subdwarfs of type L, T and Y ===
The low metallicity of subdwarfs is coupled with their old age. The early universe had a low content of elements heavier than helium and formed stars and brown dwarfs with lower metallicity. Only later supernovae, planetary nebulae and neutron star mergers enriched the universe with heavier elements. The old subdwarfs belong therefore often to the older structures in the Milky Way, mainly the thick disk and the galactic halo. Objects in the thick disk or the halo have a high space velocity compared to the Sun, which belongs to the younger thin disk. A high proper motion can be used to discover subdwarfs. Additionally the subdwarfs have spectral features that make them different from subdwarfs with solar metallicity. All subdwarfs share the suppression of the near-infrared spectrum, mainly the H-band and K-band. The low metallicity increases the collision induced absorption of hydrogen, causing this suppressed near-infrared spectrum. This is seen as blue infrared colors compared to brown dwarfs with solar metallicity. The low metallicity also changes other absorption features, such as deeper CaH and TiO bands at 0.7 μm in L-subdwarfs, a weaker VO band at 0.8 μm in early L-subdwarfs and stronger FeH band at 0.99 μm for mid- to late L-subdwarfs. 2MASS J0532+8246 was discovered in 2003 as the first L-type subdwarf, which was later re-classified as an extreme subdwarf. The L-type subdwarfs have subtypes similar to M-type subdwarfs: The subtypes subdwarf (sd), extreme subdwarfs (esd) and ultra subdwarfs (usd), which are defined by their decreasing metallicity, compared to solar metallicity, which is defined on a logarithmic scale:

- subdwarfs have $\ -1.0 < \bigl[ \tfrac{ \mathsf{Fe} }{ \mathsf{H} } \bigr]_\star \leq -0.3\ ,$
- extreme subdwarfs have $\ -1.7 < \bigl[ \tfrac{ \mathsf{Fe} }{\mathsf{H} } \bigr]_\star \leq -1.0\ ,$ and
- ultra subdwarfs have $\ \bigl[ \tfrac{ \mathsf{Fe} }{\mathsf{H} } \bigr]_\star \leq -1.7 ~.$
- The Sun sets the scale at $\ \bigl[ \tfrac{\mathsf{Fe} }{\mathsf{H}} \bigr]_\odot \equiv 0\ ,$ by definition.

For T-type subdwarfs only a small sample of subdwarfs and extreme subdwarfs is known.

2MASSI J0937347+293142 is the first object that was discovered in 2002 as a T-type subdwarf candidate and in 2006 it was confirmed to have low metallicity. The first two extreme subdwarfs of type T were discovered in 2020 by scientists and volunteers of the Backyard Worlds project. The first extreme subdwarfs of type T are WISEA 0414−5854 and WISEA 1810−1010. Subdwarfs of type T and Y have less methane in their atmosphere, due to the lower concentration of carbon in these subdwarfs. This leads to a bluer W1-W2 (WISE) or ch1-ch2 (Spitzer) color, compared to objects with similar temperature, but with solar metallicity. The color of T-types as a single classification criterion can be misleading. The closest directly imaged exoplanet, COCONUTS-2b, was first classified as a subdwarf of type T due to its color, while not showing a high tangential velocity. Only in 2021 it was identified as an exoplanet.

The first Y-type subdwarf candidate was discovered in 2021, the brown dwarf WISE 1534–1043, which shows a moderate red Spitzer Space Telescope color (ch1-ch2 = 0.925±0.039 mag). The very red color between J and ch2 (J-ch2 > 8.03 mag) and the absolute brightness would suggest a much redder ch1-ch2 color of about 2.4 to 3 mag. Due to the agreement with new subdwarf models, together with the high tangential velocity of 200 km/s, Kirkpatrick, Marocco et al. (2021) argue that the most likely explanation is a cold very low-metal brown dwarf, maybe the first subdwarf of type Y.

Binaries can help to determine the age and mass of these subdwarfs. The subdwarf VVV 1256−62B (sdL3) was discovered as a companion to a halo white dwarf, allowing the age to be measured at 8.4 to 13.8 billion years. It has a mass of 84 to 87 M_{J}, making VVV 1256−62B likely a red dwarf star. The subdwarf Wolf 1130C (sdT8) is the companion of an old subdwarf-white dwarf binary, which is estimated to be older than 10 billion years. It has a mass of 44.9 M_{J}, making it a brown dwarf.

=== Examples of cool subdwarfs ===
- Kapteyn's Star
- Groombridge 1830
- Mu Cassiopeiae
- 2MASS J05325346+8246465, a possible halo brown dwarf and the first substellar subdwarf.
- SSSPM J1549-3544

== Hot (blue) subdwarfs ==
Hot subdwarfs, of bluish spectral types O and B are an entirely different class of object than cool subdwarfs; they are also called "extreme horizontal-branch stars". Hot subdwarf stars represent a late stage in the evolution of some stars, caused when a red giant star loses its outer hydrogen layers before the core begins to fuse helium.

The reasons for their premature loss of their hydrogen envelope are unclear, but the interaction of stars in a binary star system is thought to be one of the main mechanisms. Single subdwarfs may be the result of a merger of two white dwarfs or gravitational influence from substellar companions. B-type subdwarfs, being more luminous than white dwarfs, are a significant component in the hot star population of old stellar systems, such as globular clusters and elliptical galaxies.

=== Heavy metal subdwarfs ===
The heavy metal subdwarfs are a type of hot subdwarf star with high observed concentrations (relative to the Sun) of heavy metals. The metals detected include germanium, strontium, yttrium, zirconium and lead. Known heavy metal subdwarfs include HE 2359-2844, LS IV-14 116, and HE 1256-2738. It is thought that the heavy metal subdwarfs represent a transitional stage between newly-formed He-rich subdwarf stars and the more normal He-poor subdwarfs.

It is suggested that radiative levitation is responsible for the apparent high concentrations of heavy metals in the stellar photosphere, over production via nucleosynthesis itself, though this remains an open question in the literature.
