= HD 169830 c =

Extrasolar planet three and a half times the mass of Jupiter

Discovery
- Discovered by: Mayor, Udry et al.
- Discovery site: Switzerland
- Discovery date: 30 June 2003
- Detection method: Radial velocity

Orbital characteristics
- Semi-major axis: 3.075+0.132 −0.146 AU
- Eccentricity: 0.246+0.022 −0.018
- Orbital period (sidereal): 4.980+0.016 −0.018 yr
- Inclination: 24.469°+12.739° −7.205°
- Longitude of ascending node: 16.522°+25.025° −30.708°
- Time of periastron: 2451246.392+1.131 −1.167
- Argument of periastron: 313.483°+6.950° −7.217°
- Semi-amplitude: 49.041+0.821 −0.726 m/s
- Star: HD 169830

Physical characteristics
- Mass: 7.669+1.937 −2.755 M_{J}

HD 169830 c is an extrasolar planet, most likely a gas giant, with a minimum mass three and a half times that of Jupiter. Its orbit is eccentric, with a period (year) of 1830 days. In 2022, the true mass and inclination of HD 169830 c were measured via astrometry.

== See also ==
- HD 169830 b
