= HD 65216 b =

Extrasolar planet in the constellation of Carina

Discovery
- Discovered by: Mayor et al.
- Discovery site: La Silla Observatory
- Discovery date: 2003
- Detection method: Doppler spectroscopy

Orbital characteristics
- Semi-major axis: 1.301±0.020 AU
- Eccentricity: 0.27±0.02
- Orbital period (sidereal): 577.6±1.328 d
- Argument of perihelion: 212±3 º
- Semi-amplitude: 35.70±1.28 m/s
- Star: HD 65216

Physical characteristics
- Mass: ≥1.295±0.062 M_{J}

HD 65216 b is an extrasolar planet located approximately 115 light-years away in the constellation of Carina, orbiting the star HD 65216. This planet was discovered by the Geneva Extrasolar Planet Search Team in 2003. Like most planet candidates so far, it was detected with the radial velocity method.

The planet has a minimum mass about 30% more than Jupiter. Since the discovery method gives only the minimum mass, its true mass is probably larger than this. The planet orbits the star in an eccentric orbit and takes 577 days to complete one orbit.
