= HD 10647 =

Star in the constellation Eridanus

- Location of HD 10647 (circled)

Observation data Epoch J2000.0 Equinox ICRS
- Constellation: Eridanus
- Right ascension: 01^{h} 42^{m} 29.3145^{s}
- Declination: −53° 44′ 26.991″
- Apparent magnitude (V): +5.52

Characteristics
- Evolutionary stage: main sequence
- Spectral type: F9V
- B−V color index: 0.551

Astrometry
Radial velocity (R_{v})	27.64±0.12 km/s
Proper motion (μ)	RA: 166.041(34) mas/yr Dec.: −105.496(46) mas/yr
Parallax (π)	57.6409±0.0453 mas
Distance	56.58 ± 0.04 ly (17.35 ± 0.01 pc)
Absolute magnitude (M_{V})	4.31

Details
Mass	1.15+0.01 −0.02 M_{☉}
Radius	1.10±0.02 R_{☉}
Luminosity	1.41 L_{☉}
Surface gravity (log g)	4.55±0.02 cgs
Temperature	6,207±11 K
Metallicity [Fe/H]	−0.027±0.008 dex
Rotation	10±3
Rotational velocity (v sin i)	4.9 km/s
Age	0.70+0.30 −0.24 Gyr

Other designations
- q^{1} Eridani, 5 G. Eridani, CPD−54°365, GJ 3109, HIP 7978, HR 506, SAO 232501

Database references
SIMBAD	data

HD 10647 (q^{1} Eridani) is a 6th-magnitude yellow-white dwarf star, 57 light-years away in the constellation of Eridanus. The star is visible to the unaided eye under very dark skies. It is slightly hotter and more luminous than the Sun, and at 700 million years old, it is also younger. An extrasolar planet was discovered orbiting this star in 2003.

There is a companion star lying at an angular separation of 35.8'. It is a red dwarf with a spectral type of M4.0Ve.

== Planetary system ==
Millimetre image of the disk from the REASONS survey

In 2003, Michel Mayor's team announced the discovery of a new planet, HD 10647 b, in Paris at the XIX IAP Colloquium Extrasolar Planets: Today & Tomorrow. The Anglo-Australian Planet Search team initially did not detect the planet in 2004, though a solution was made by 2006. The CORALIE data was finally published in 2013.

The IRAS infrared space telescope detected an excess of infrared radiation from the star, indicating a possible circumstellar disk. Out of the 300 nearest Sun-like stars, the disk has the highest fractional luminosity out of all of them. It is unusually bright, but not unusually massive; the lower bound of the mass is 8 times that of the Earth.

The inclination of the disk is relatively high, and the disk is asymmetrical, being more extended in the northeast direction than the southwest. It extends from 34 astronomical units (AU) at the inner edge to 134 AU at the outer edge. The inner edge is sharp, suggesting the existence of a planet that carved out the edge. HD 10647 b, with a semimajor axis of about 2 AU, is too far to be responsible. However, other potential planets may be responsible for this feature.

If HD 10647 b shares the same orbital inclination as the disk (76.7°±1.0°), its mass should be about 1.07 Jupiter masses, close to its minimum mass of 0.90 Jupiter masses.

There is some evidence for an additional, warm asteroid belt-like component further in, at 3 to 10 AU away from the star.

The HD 10647 planetary system (Note: HD 10647 b: Bisht & Jones (2024) Disks: Lovell et al. (2021))
Companion (in order from star)	Mass	Semimajor axis (AU)	Orbital period (days)	Eccentricity	Inclination (°)	Radius
b	1.07±0.05 M_{J}	2.02±0.01	991.90±1.45	0.37±0.03	—	—
Dust disk	3–10 AU				—	—
Dust disk	34–134 AU				76.1±1.0°	—
