= HD 216770 b =

Extrasolar planet in the constellation Piscis Austrinus

Discovery
- Discovered by: Mayor et al.
- Discovery site: (United States) California, USA
- Discovery date: June 30, 2003
- Detection method: Doppler spectroscopy

Orbital characteristics
- Apastron: 0.63 AU (94,000,000 km)
- Periastron: 0.29 AU (43,000,000 km)
- Semi-major axis: 0.46 AU (69,000,000 km)
- Eccentricity: 0.37 ± 0.06
- Orbital period (sidereal): 118.45 ± 0.55 d 0.32429 y
- Average orbital speed: 42
- Time of periastron: 2,452,672 ± 3.5
- Argument of periastron: 281 ± 10
- Semi-amplitude: 30.9 ± 1.9
- Star: HD 216770

Physical characteristics
- Mass: >0.65 M_{J}

HD 216770 b is an extrasolar planet orbiting the star HD 216770. It has a mass about two thirds that of Jupiter, largest planet in the Solar System. But unlike the gas giants in the Solar System, it orbits in a very eccentric orbit around the star. The mean distance from the star is slightly larger than Mercury's, and it completes one orbit around the star in every 118 days.
