= HD 141937 =

Star in the constellation Libra

Observation data Epoch J2000 Equinox ICRS
- Constellation: Libra
- Right ascension: 15^{h} 52^{m} 17.54740^{s}
- Declination: −18° 26′ 09.8432″
- Apparent magnitude (V): 7.25

Characteristics
- Evolutionary stage: main sequence
- Spectral type: G1V
- B−V color index: +0.628±0.002

Astrometry
Radial velocity (R_{v})	−3.36±0.14 km/s
Proper motion (μ)	RA: +97.862 mas/yr Dec.: +22.363 mas/yr
Parallax (π)	30.5637±0.0898 mas
Distance	106.7 ± 0.3 ly (32.72 ± 0.10 pc)
Absolute magnitude (M_{V})	4.71

Details
Mass	1.03 M_{☉}
Radius	1.05 R_{☉}
Luminosity	1.202±0.003 L_{☉}
Surface gravity (log g)	4.44 cgs
Temperature	5,890+15 −30 K
Metallicity [Fe/H]	+0.10±0.01 dex
Rotational velocity (v sin i)	6.0 km/s
Age	3.82 Gyr

Other designations
- BD−17°4442, HD 141937, HIP 77740, SAO 159551

Database references
SIMBAD	data
Exoplanet Archive	data

HD 141937 is a star in the southern zodiac constellation of Libra, positioned a couple of degrees to the north of Lambda Librae. It is a yellow-hued star with an apparent visual magnitude of 7.25, which means it is too faint to be seen with the naked eye. This object is located at a distance of 106.7 light-years from the Sun based on parallax, but is drifting closer with a radial velocity of −3.4 km/s. It has an absolute magnitude of 4.71.

This is a G-type main-sequence star with a stellar classification of G1V. It is a solar-type star with slightly higher mass and radius compared to the Sun. The metallicity is higher than solar. It is an estimated 3.8 billion years old and is spinning with a projected rotational velocity of 6 km/s. The star is radiating 1.2 times the luminosity of the Sun from its photosphere at an effective temperature of 5,890 K.

The star has a substellar companion (HD 141937 b), either a planet or a brown dwarf, announced in April 2001 by the European Southern Observatory. It has a minimum mass of 9.7 M_{J}. In 2020, the inclination of the orbit was measured via astrometry, indicating a true mass of 27.4 M_{J}, which would make it a brown dwarf. However, a more recent astrometric study in 2026 found an edge-on orbit, indicating a planetary mass. A 662-day orbit places the orbital distance 1.5 times farther away from the star as Earth is from the Sun, with a high eccentricity of 0.46.

The HD 141937 planetary system
Companion (in order from star)	Mass	Semimajor axis (AU)	Orbital period (days)	Eccentricity	Inclination (°)	Radius
b	11.3±0.5 M_{J}	1.54±0.02	662.37±0.09	0.460±0.004	90.00+6.75 −6.76	—

== See also ==
- HD 142022
- HD 142415
- List of extrasolar planets
