= HD 10647 b =

Extrasolar planet in the constellation Eridanus

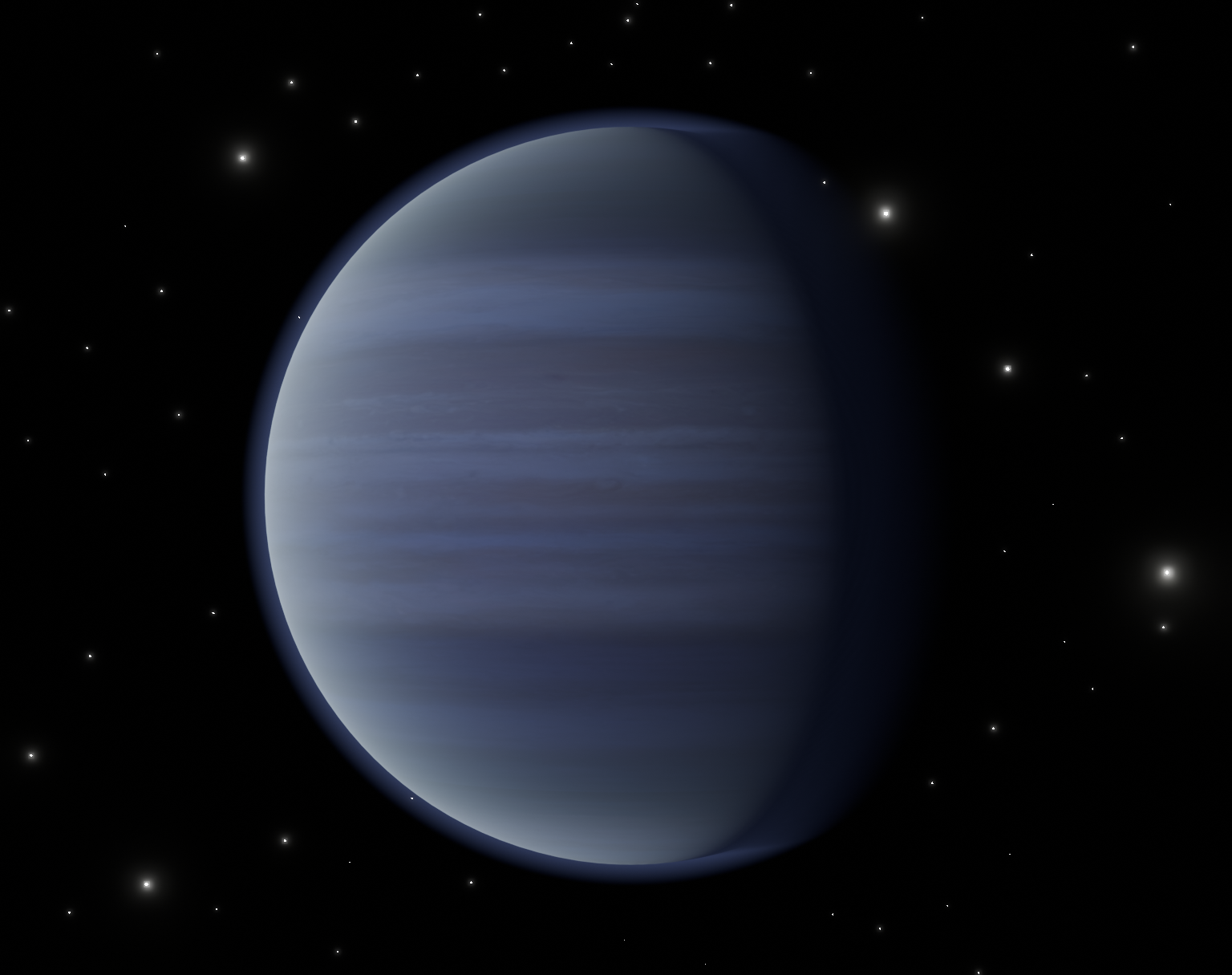

Discovery
- Discovered by: Mayor et al.
- Discovery site: Paris, France
- Discovery date: 30 June 2003
- Detection method: Doppler Spectroscopy

Orbital characteristics
- Apastron: 1.712 AU
- Periastron: 2.317 AU
- Semi-major axis: 2.03 ± 0.15 AU (304,000,000 ± 22,000,000 km)
- Eccentricity: 0.16 ± 0.22
- Orbital period (sidereal): 1003 ± 56 d
- Average orbital speed: 22.05 km/s 21.91 km/s
- Time of periastron: 2452261 ± 47
- Argument of periastron: 68 ± 17
- Semi-amplitude: 17.9 ± 4.6
- Star: HD 10647

Physical characteristics
- Mass: 0.93 M_{J}

HD 10647 b, also catalogued as q^{1} Eridani b, is an extrasolar planet approximately 57 light-years away in the constellation of Eridanus (the River). The planet is a mid-Jovian that orbits 103% farther from the star than Earth to the Sun. It takes about 33 months to orbit with semi-amplitude of 17.9 m/s.

== See also ==
- 51 Pegasi b
- 91 Aquarii b
- 109 Piscium b
- Epsilon Eridani b
