= F-type main-sequence star =

Stellar classification

- The primary of the wide binary Tau Boötis is an F-type main-sequence star.

Characteristics
- Type: Class of moderately sized main sequence star.
- Mass range: 1.12–1.6 M_{☉}
- Temperature: 6050–7220 K
- Average luminosity: 1.64–7.31 L_{☉}

External links
- Media category
- Q995268

An F-type main-sequence star (Note: Also called an "F-type dwarf" or "yellow-white dwarf") is a main-sequence, core-hydrogen-fusing star of spectral type F. The spectral luminosity class is V. They have from around 1.1 to 1.6 times the mass of the Sun and surface temperatures between about 6,000 and 7,200 K. F-type stars appear white from space due to having a higher temperature than the Sun. Notable examples of F-type stars include Procyon A, Gamma Virginis A and B, and Tabby's Star.

== Subdwarfs ==
There are subdwarf stars, that is stars of luminosity class VI, of spectral class F although these are much less common than G, K, and M subdwarfs. These stars are fusing hydrogen in their cores like normal main-sequence stars, but due to their low metallicity they lie up to two magnitudes below the main sequence (ie. less luminous).

== Spectral standard stars ==
Properties of typical F-type main-sequence stars
Spectral type	Mass (M_{☉})	Radius (R_{☉})	Luminosity (L_{☉})	Effective temperature (K)	Color index (B − V)
F0V	1.60	1.728	7.31	7,220	0.30
F1V	1.50	1.679	6.17	7,020	0.33
F2V	1.43	1.622	5.13	6,820	0.37
F3V	1.41	1.578	4.66	6,750	0.39
F4V	1.38	1.533	4.19	6,670	0.41
F5V	1.32	1.473	3.60	6,550	0.44
F6V	1.25	1.359	2.70	6,350	0.49
F7V	1.21	1.324	2.45	6,280	0.50
F8V	1.16	1.221	1.96	6,180	0.53
F9V	1.12	1.167	1.64	6,050	0.56

The revised Yerkes Atlas system (Johnson & Morgan 1953) listed a dense grid of F-type dwarf spectral standard stars; however, not all of these have survived to this day as stable standards.

The anchor points of the MK spectral classification system among the F-type main-sequence dwarf stars, i.e. those standard stars that have remained unchanged over years and can be used to define the system, are considered to be 78 Ursae Majoris (F2 V) and Pi^{3} Orionis (F6 V). In addition to those two standards, Morgan & Keenan (1973) considered the following stars to be dagger standards: HR 1279 (F3 V), HD 27524 (F5 V), HD 27808 (F8 V), HD 27383 (F9 V), and Beta Virginis (F9 V).

Other primary MK standard stars include HD 23585 (F0 V), HD 26015 (F3 V), and HD 27534 (F5 V). Note that two Hyades members with almost identical HD designations (HD 27524 and HD 27534) are both considered strong F5 V standard stars, and indeed they share nearly identical colors and magnitudes.

Gray & Garrison (1989) provide a modern table of dwarf standards for the hotter F-type stars. F1 and F7 dwarf standards stars are rarely listed, but have changed slightly over the years among expert classifiers. Often-used standard stars in this class include 37 Ursae Majoris (F1 V) and Iota Piscium (F7 V). No F4 V standard stars currently have been officially published.

F9 V defines the boundary between the hot stars classified by Morgan, and the cooler stars classified by Keenan a step lower, and there are discrepancies in the literature on which stars define the F/G dwarf boundary. Morgan & Keenan (1973) listed Beta Virginis and HD 27383 as F9 V standards, but Keenan & McNeil (1989) listed HD 10647 as their F9 V standard instead.

== Life cycle ==
F-type stars have a life-cycle similar to G-type stars. They are hydrogen-fusing and will eventually grow into a red giant once the supply of hydrogen in their cores is depleted. Eventually they shed their outer layers, creating a planetary nebula, and leaving behind, at the center of the nebula, a hot white dwarf.

F-type stars spend 2–6 billion years on the main sequence. In comparison, G-type stars, like the Sun, remain on the main sequence for about 10 billion years.

== Planets ==
Some of the nearest F-type stars known to support planets include Upsilon Andromedae, Tau Boötis, HD 10647, HD 33564, HD 142 and HD 60532.

== Habitability ==
Some studies show that there is a possibility that life could also develop on planets that orbit an F-type star. It is estimated that the habitable zone of a relatively hot F0 star would extend from about 2.0 AU to 3.7 AU and between 1.1 and 2.2 AU for a relatively cool F8 star. However, relative to a G-type star the main problems for a hypothetical lifeform in this particular scenario would be the more intense light and the shorter stellar lifespan of the home star.

F-type stars are known to emit much higher energy forms of light, such as UV radiation, which in the long term can have a profoundly negative effect on DNA molecules. Studies have shown that, for a hypothetical planet positioned at an equivalent habitable distance from an F-type star as the Earth is from the Sun (this is farther away from the F-type star, outside the habitable zone of a G2-type), and with a similar atmosphere, life on its surface would receive about 2.5 to 7.1 times more damage from UV light compared to that on Earth. Thus, for its native lifeforms to survive, the hypothetical planet would need to have sufficient atmospheric shielding, such as a denser ozone layer in the upper atmosphere. Without a robust ozone layer, life could theoretically develop on the planet's surface, but it would most likely be confined to underwater or underground regions or has somehow adapted external covering against it (e.g. shells).
