= 2MASS =

Astronomical survey of the whole sky in the infrared

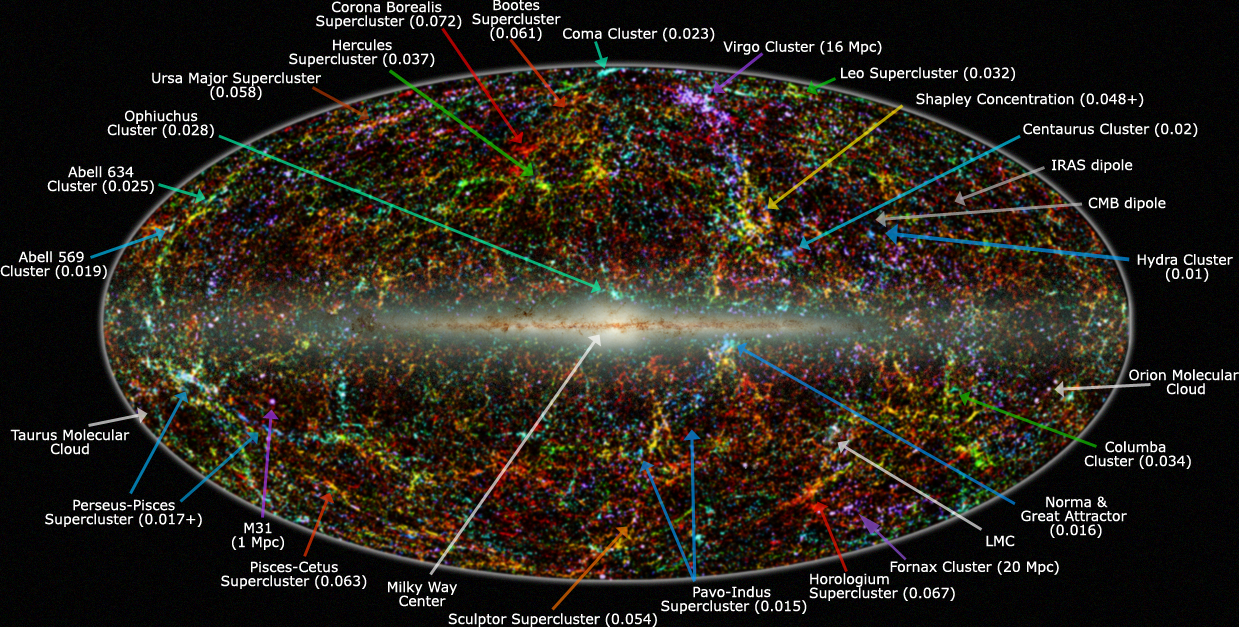
- Alternative names: Two Micron All-Sky Survey
- Website: www.ipac.caltech.edu/2mass/
- Related media on Commons

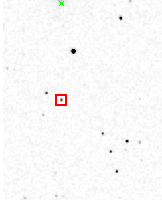
2MASS J-band image. The brown dwarf 2MASS J17111353+2326333 is highlighted.

The Two Micron All-Sky Survey (2MASS) was an astronomical survey of the whole sky in infrared light. It took place between 1997 and 2001, in two different locations: at the U.S. Fred Lawrence Whipple Observatory on Mount Hopkins, Arizona, and at the Cerro Tololo Inter-American Observatory in Chile, each using a 1.3-meter telescope for the Northern and Southern Hemisphere, respectively. It was conducted in the short-wavelength infrared at three distinct frequency bands (J, H, and K) near 2 micrometres, from which the photometric survey with its HgCdTe detectors derives its name.

2MASS produced an astronomical catalog with over 300 million observed objects, including minor planets of the Solar System, brown dwarfs, low-mass stars, nebulae, star clusters and galaxies. In addition, 1 million objects were cataloged in the 2MASS Extended Source Catalog (2MASX). The cataloged objects are designated with a "2MASS" and "2MASX" prefix, respectively.

== Catalog ==
The final data release for 2MASS occurred in 2003, and is served by the Infrared Science Archive. The goals of this survey included:

- Detection of galaxies in the "Zone of Avoidance", a strip of sky obscured in visible light by our own galaxy, the Milky Way.
- Detection of brown dwarfs. 2MASS discovered a total of 173, including 2MASS 0939-2448, 2MASS 0415-0935, 2M1207, and 2MASS J04414489+2301513.
- An extensive survey of low mass stars, the most common type of star both in our own galaxy and others.
- Cataloging of all detected stars and galaxies.
- Infrared measurements from the 2MASS survey have been particularly effective at unveiling previously undiscovered star clusters.

Numerical descriptions of point sources (stars, planets, asteroids) and extended sources (galaxies, nebulae) were catalogued by automated computer programs to an average limiting magnitude of about 14. More than 300 million point sources and 1 million extended sources were cataloged. In November 2003, a team of scientists announced the discovery of the Canis Major Dwarf Galaxy, at that time the closest known satellite galaxy to the Milky Way, based on analysis of 2MASS stellar data.

The resulting data and images from the survey are currently in the public domain, and may be accessed online for free by anyone. There is also a list of 2MASS science publications with links to free pre-publication copies of the papers.

2MASS is sponsored by the University of Massachusetts Amherst, the Infrared Processing and Analysis Center (IPAC, run by Jet Propulsion Laboratory (JPL) and Caltech), NASA, and the National Science Foundation (NSF).
