= List of exoplanets discovered in 2022 =

This list of exoplanets discovered in 2022 is a list of confirmed exoplanets that were first reported in 2022.

For exoplanets detected only by radial velocity, the listed value for mass is a lower limit. See Minimum mass for more information.

Name	Mass (M_{J})	Radius (R_{J})	Period (days)	Semi-major axis (AU)	Temp. (K)	Discovery method	Distance (ly)	Host star mass (M_{☉})	Host star temp. (K)	Remarks
29 Cygni b	13.9^{+6.1}_{−5.1}			16.9^{+3.4}_{−1.9}		astrometry + imaging	130.9±0.9	2.14±0.15	8790^{+1513}_{−1292}	Host star also known as HIP 99770
CoRoT-35b	1.10±0.37	1.68±0.11	3.22748±0.00008	0.04290±0.00092	1747±62	transit	3700±200	1.01^{+0.07}_{−0.06}	6390±130	
CoRoT-36b	0.68^{+0.47}_{−0.43}	1.41±0.14	5.616531±0.000023	0.066±0.007	1567±35	transit	3110±60	1.32±0.09	6730±140	
EPIC 206317286 c	0.0168±0.098	0.186^{+0.015}_{−0.014}	17.51547^{+0.00228}_{−0.00296}		570	transit		0.832^{+0.253}_{−0.367}	4752±138	
EPIC 210768568 b		0.088±0.004	3.2141±0.0002	0.0511^{+0.0021}_{−0.0028}		transit	965	1.018±0.131	5711±105	
EPIC 246078343 b		0.068±0.007	0.8094±0.00003	0.0117^{+0.0009}_{−0.0012}		transit	954	0.808^{+0.364}_{−0.256}	4116±138	
EPIC 246078343 c		0.110±0.006	5.3301±0.0003	0.0426^{+0.0016}_{−0.0019}		transit	954	0.808^{+0.364}_{−0.256}	4116±138	
EPIC 246220667 b		0.172±0.006	6.6690±0.0002	0.0552^{+0.0017}_{−0.0023}		transit	835	0.814^{+0.363}_{−0.251}	4343±138	
EPIC 246220667 c		0.109±0.006	4.3696±0.0001	0.0487^{+0.0027}_{−0.0031}		transit	835	0.814^{+0.363}_{−0.251}	4343±138	
EPIC 247422570 b		0.189±0.009	5.9382^{+0.0006}_{−0.0004}	0.0586^{+0.0032}_{−0.0033}		transit	2181	0.893^{+0.406}_{−0.275}	5590±138	
Gaia-1b	1.68±0.11	1.229±0.021	3.052524±0.000017	0.04047±0.00094		transit	1201±7	0.949±0.066	5470±110	First confirmed exoplanet discovered by Gaia, along with Gaia-2b
Gaia-2b	0.817±0.047	1.322±0.013	3.6915224±0.0000039	0.0467±0.0015		transit	676±3	1.000±0.095	5720±84	First confirmed exoplanet discovered by Gaia, along with Gaia-1b
Gliese 514b	0.0164±0.0028		140.43±0.41	0.422^{+0.014}_{−0.015}	202±11	radial vel.	24.850±0.010	0.510±0.051	3714±51	Planetary orbit partially in habitable zone
Gliese 1002 b	0.0034±0.0004		10.3465±0.027	0.0457±0.0013	230.9±6.7	radial vel.	15.808±0.003	0.120±0.010	3024±52	Planet in habitable zone
Gliese 1002 c	0.0043±0.0005		21.202±0.013	0.0738±0.0021	181.7±5.2	radial vel.	15.808±0.003	0.120±0.010	3024±52	Planet in habitable zone
Gliese 3929 b	0.0055±0.0014	0.097±0.004	2.6162745±0.000003	0.0252±0.0005	568±6	transit	51.64±0.02	0.309±0.014	3369±51	Another planet in system is suspected
Gliese 3929 c	0.0180±0.0029		15.04±0.03	0.081±0.002	317±3	radial vel.	51.64±0.02	0.309±0.014	3369±51	
GJ 463 b	3.6±0.4		3448^{+110}_{−88}	3.53±0.07		radial vel.	59.91±0.03	0.49±0.02	3540±41	Host star also known as Ross 690
GJ 3090 b	0.0105	0.19	2.8531042±0.0000032	0.03165	696	transit	73.21±0.04	0.519±0.013	3556±70	Host star also known as TOI-177
GJ 3090 c	0.0538		12.734^{+0.033}_{−0.026}	0.08575	421	radial vel.	73.21±0.04	0.519±0.013	3556±70	Host star also known as TOI-177
HD 3167 e	0.0306±0.0037		102.09^{+0.52}_{−0.50}	0.4048^{+0.0077}_{−0.0074}	375±7	radial vel.	154.59±0.13	0.852^{+0.026}_{−0.015}	5300±73	
HD 18599 b	0.0758^{+0.0223}_{−0.0242}	0.232±0.012	4.1374354^{+0.0000036}_{−0.0000037}	0.0480±0.0004	935±11	transit	126.02±0.06	0.863±0.020	5145±50	Host star also known as TOI-179, also red dwarf star in the system
HD 20329b	0.0233±0.0034	0.154±0.006	0.926118^{+0.000050}_{−0.000043}	0.0180±0.0003	2141±27	transit	207.7±0.9	0.90±0.05	5596±50	
HD 22532 b	2.12±0.09		872.6±2.8	1.900±0.004		radial vel.	526±2	1.20±0.05	5067^{+59}_{−22}	Giant host star
HD 22946 b		0.154±0.009	4.040301^{+0.000023}_{−0.000042}	0.0528±0.0030	1378±36	transit	205.08±0.16	1.158±0.058	6210^{+173}_{−158}	Host star also known as TOI-411, third transiting planet in system is suspected
HD 22946 c		0.245±0.013	9.573096^{+0.000026}_{−0.000023}	0.0939±0.0054	1033±27	transit	205.08±0.16	1.158±0.058	6210^{+173}_{−158}	Host star also known as TOI-411, third transiting planet in system is suspected
HD 23472 d	0.0017±0.0006	0.067±0.005	3.97664^{+0.000030}_{−0.000044}	0.04298^{+0.00063}_{−0.00065}	909^{+35}_{−32}	transit	127.48±0.06	0.67±0.03	4684±99	
HD 23472 e	0.0023±0.0009	0.073±0.006	7.90754±0.00011	0.0680±0.0010	723^{+28}_{−25}	transit	127.48±0.06	0.67±0.03	4684±99	
HD 23472 f	0.0024±0.0013	0.102±0.007	12.1621839^{+0.00012}_{−0.000099}	0.0906±0.0014	630^{+27}_{−23}	transit	127.48±0.06	0.67±0.03	4684±99	
HD 28109 b	0.058^{+0.029}_{−0.024}	0.196±0.009	22.89104^{+0.00035}_{−0.00036}	0.1357±0.0034	881.2±7.5	transit	457.0±0.6	1.26±0.08	6120±50	
HD 28109 c	0.025^{+0.013}_{−0.010}	0.378±0.010	56.00819^{+0.00194}_{−0.00202}	0.308±0.011	585.2^{+8.7}_{−8.3}	transit	457.0±0.6	1.26±0.08	6120±50	
HD 28109 d	0.018^{+0.009}_{−0.007}	0.290±0.010	84.25999^{+0.00744}_{−0.00662}	0.411±0.016	506.5^{+8.7}_{−8.0}	transit	457.0±0.6	1.26±0.08	6120±50	
HD 29399 b	1.57±0.11		892.7±5.9	1.913±0.008		radial vel.	144.2±0.3	1.15±0.04	4845±52	Giant host star
HD 33142 d	0.89^{+0.06}_{−0.05}		810.2^{+3.8}_{−4.2}	1.955^{+0.016}_{−0.012}		radial vel.	394.3±0.9	1.52±0.03	5025.4^{+23.6}_{−15.5}	Giant host star
HD 56414 b	0.0944±0.0053	0.331±0.018	29.04992±0.00021	0.229±0.004	1133±30	transit	873±3	1.89±0.11	8500±150	Host star also known as TOI-1228
HD 64121 b	2.56±0.19		623.0±3.4	1.510±0.006		radial vel.	424.1±1.7	1.18±0.05	5066^{+58}_{−60}	Giant host star
HD 69123 b	3.04±0.16		1193.3±7.0	2.482±0.010		radial vel.	245.0±1.3	1.43±0.07	4787^{+280}_{−51}	Giant host star
HD 83443 c	1.5^{+0.5}_{−0.2}		8241^{+1019}_{−530}	8.0±0.8		radial vel.	133.6±0.2	1.00±0.03	5442±17	Eccentric orbit due to hot Jupiter in system
HD 93963A b		0.121±0.004	1.0391353^{+0.0000049}_{−0.0000045}	0.02085±0.00037	2042±27	transit	268.6±1.3	1.109±0.043	5987±64	Host star also known as TOI-1797
HD 93963A c		0.288±0.005	3.6451398^{+0.0000106}_{−0.0000142}	0.04813±0.00085	1344±18	transit	268.6±1.3	1.109±0.043	5987±64	Host star also known as TOI-1797
HD 109833 b		0.258^{+0.014}_{−0.012}	9.188526±0.000026			transit	259.5±0.2	1.08±0.05	5881±50	Young host star also known as TOI-1097
HD 109833 c		0.231^{+0.018}_{−0.016}	13.900148±0.000057			transit	259.5±0.2	1.08±0.05	5881±50	Young host star also known as TOI-1097
HD 114082 b	8.0±1.0 5-10	1.00±0.03	109.75^{+0.40}_{−0.37}	0.5109^{+0.0081}_{−0.0083}		transit	310.1±0.7	1.47±0.07	6651±35	Young star, eccentric planetary orbit
HD 167768 b	0.85^{+0.12}_{−0.11}		20.6532^{+0.0032}_{−0.0032}	0.1512^{+0.0058}_{−0.0063}	1874	radial vel.	353.5	1.08^{+0.14}_{−0.12}	4830	Host red giant star also known as HR 6840, other planets in system are suspected
HD 191939 g	0.0425±0.0063		284^{+10}_{−8}	0.812±0.028	278±6	radial vel.	174.4±0.1	0.81±0.04	5348±100	Habitable zone planet
HD 191939 f	>2.1		>2200	>3.2	<125		174.4±0.1	0.81±0.04	5348±100	
HD 199981 b	10.070±2.483		21000±8000	13.048±3.073		radial vel.	66.7±2.4			Host star also known as GJ 9714
HD 105618 b	0.079±0.008		9.9	0.091±0.004		radial vel.	227.8±0.4			Also brown dwarf in the system
HD 206893 c	12.3^{+1.1}_{−1.2}	1.46^{+0.18}_{−0.06}	2082	3.53^{+0.08}_{−0.07}	1181.9^{+20.6}_{−53.9}	radial vel.	125.1±2.6	1.24	6486	Some deuterium burning despite its low mass, also another brown dwarf is present in the system
HD 21019 b	0.014±0.002		2.56	0.034±0.002		radial vel.	120			Host star also known as GJ 2030
HD 21019 c	12.934±2.361		25600±2500	16.752±1.312		radial vel.	120			Host star also known as GJ 2030
HD 21175 b	0.038±0.010		10.6	0.091±0.004		radial vel.	57.7			Host star also known as GJ 3222, planet on extremely eccentric orbit, also brown dwarf in the system
HD 260655 b	0.0067±0.0011	0.111±0.002	2.76953±0.00003	0.02933±0.00024	709±4	transit	32.63±0.07	0.439±0.011	3803±10	Host star also known as TOI-4599
HD 260655 c	0.0097±0.0015	0.137±0.004	5.70588±0.00007	0.04749±0.00039	557±3	transit	32.63±0.07	0.439±0.011	3803±10	Host star also known as TOI-4599
HIP 34269 b	0.0052±0.0007	0.103±0.005	0.548177±0.000019	0.01188±0.00040	1617±41	transit	154.81±0.15	0.740±0.017	4440±100	Host star also known as TOI-500
HIP 34269 c	0.0146±0.0016		6.6356±0.0040			radial vel.	154.81±0.15	0.740±0.017	4440±100	Host star also known as TOI-500
HIP 34269 d	0.1055±0.0033		26.233±0.020			radial vel.	154.81±0.15	0.740±0.017	4440±100	Host star also known as TOI-500
HIP 34269 e	0.0376±0.0042		61.30±0.28			radial vel.	154.81±0.15	0.740±0.017	4440±100	Host star also known as TOI-500
HIP 94235 b		0.268±0.027	7.713057±0.000021	0.07870^{+0.00056}_{−0.00017}	1060±50	transit	191.2±0.4	1.094^{+0.024}_{−0.007}	5991±50	Host star also known as TOI-4399, shares system with a red dwarf
HR 7321 b	0.30±0.07		285.1^{+1.2}_{−1.5}	0.937±0.003		radial vel.	200.2	1.35^{+0.19}_{−0.21}	4971	Red giant host star also known as HD 184010
HR 7321 c	0.28^{+0.08}_{−0.10}		483.3^{+3.2}_{−4.0}	1.332^{+0.006}_{−0.007}		radial vel.	200.2	1.35^{+0.19}_{−0.21}	4971	Red giant host star also known as HD 184010
HR 7321 d	0.46±0.08		837.7^{+6.4}_{−5.5}	1.922^{+0.010}_{−0.008}		radial vel.	200.2	1.35^{+0.19}_{−0.21}	4971	Red giant host star also known as HD 184010
K2-365 b	0.0272±0.0172	0.259^{+0.017}_{−0.015}	23.448172^{+0.00076}_{−0.00099}		710	transit		0.823^{+0.369}_{−0.25}	5561±138	
K2-366 b	0.0199±0.0115	0.210^{+0.016}_{−0.014}	15.93703^{+0.00079}_{−0.00114}		770	transit		0.825^{+0.366}_{−0.255}	5601±138	
K2-367 b	0.0203±0.0126	0.215^{+0.020}_{−0.017}	20.64509^{+0.00099}_{−0.00137}		450	transit		0.756^{+0.231}_{−0.347}	4348±128	
K2-368 b	0.0073±0.0042	0.118^{+0.009}_{−0.008}	5.02559^{+0.00028}_{−0.00034}		800	transit		0.746^{+0.334}_{−0.232}	4663±138	
K2-368 c	0.0078±0.0041	0.121^{+0.010}_{−0.009}	9.66018±0.00116		650	transit		0.746^{+0.334}_{−0.232}	4663±138	
K2-368 d	0.0146±0.0085	0.173^{+0.013}_{−0.012}	20.20108^{+0.00235}_{−0.00273}		500	transit		0.746^{+0.334}_{−0.232}	4663±138	
K2-369 b	0.0069±0.0040	0.117^{+0.009}_{−0.008}	5.76161^{+0.00084}_{−0.00071}		1080	transit		0.735^{+0.334}_{−0.224}	5682±138	
K2-370 b	0.0327±0.0207	0.286^{+0.020}_{−0.048}	2.14084^{+0.00003}_{−0.00004}		1420	transit		0.984^{+0.428}_{−0.303}	5377±138	
K2-371 b	4.7±2.2	1.162^{+0.082}_{−0.077}	3.11490±0.00001		1000	transit		0.958^{+0.44}_{−0.298}	4925±138	
K2-372 b	0.0289±0.0168	0.262±0.006	9.84407^{+0.00056}_{−0.00057}		870	transit		0.847^{+0.101}_{−0.088}	5479±27	
K2-373 b	0.0162±0.0089	0.184^{+0.013}_{−0.012}	11.02066^{+0.00143}_{−0.00136}		1130	transit		1.158^{+0.499}_{−0.349}	6138±138	
K2-374 b	0.0113±0.0058	0.142±0.005	4.52195^{+0.00032}_{−0.00040}		1210	transit		0.731^{+0.067}_{−0.061}	5789±21	
K2-374 c	0.0179±0.0109	0.197^{+0.008}_{−0.007}	16.43445^{+0.00237}_{−0.00270}		790	transit		0.731^{+0.067}_{−0.061}	5789±21	
K2-375 b	0.0183±0.0106	0.200^{+0.016}_{−0.015}	14.45389^{+0.00477}_{−0.00417}		1000	transit		1.119^{+0.492}_{−0.344}	5822±138	
K2-376 b	0.0129±0.0074	0.155^{+0.011}_{−0.010}	5.77647^{+0.00026}_{−0.00023}		1240	transit		0.908^{+0.394}_{−0.281}	5937±138	
K2-377 b	0.0123±0.0073	0.151^{+0.013}_{−0.011}	12.83223^{+0.00155}_{−0.00161}		530	transit		0.821^{+0.371}_{−0.258}	4200±138	
K2-378 b	0.0283±0.0173	0.257^{+0.024}_{−0.020}	2.06043^{+0.00011}_{−0.00007}		1130	transit		0.923^{+0.425}_{−0.291}	4823±138	
K2-379 b	0.0175±0.0104	0.194^{+0.032}_{−0.017}	8.77724^{+0.00062}_{−0.00061}		680	transit		0.856^{+0.375}_{−0.265}	4603±138	
K2-380 b	0.0250±0.0144	0.243^{+0.016}_{−0.015}	9.40131^{+0.00046}_{−0.00050}		1110	transit		0.993^{+0.416}_{−0.302}	5911±138	
K2-381 b	0.0040±0.0026	0.095^{+0.012}_{−0.009}	7.93893±0.00059		670	transit		0.754^{+0.337}_{−0.239}	4473±138	
K2-381 c	0.0158±0.0094	0.178^{+0.016}_{−0.013}	16.03465^{+0.00184}_{−0.00157}		530	transit		0.754^{+0.337}_{−0.239}	4473±138	
K2-381 d	0.0121±0.0070	0.150^{+0.016}_{−0.012}	26.80302^{+0.00277}_{−0.00304}		440	transit		0.754^{+0.337}_{−0.239}	4473±138	
K2-382 b	0.0162±0.0101	0.185^{+0.013}_{−0.011}	21.70015^{+0.00202}_{−0.00191}		610	transit		0.922^{+0.401}_{−0.284}	5452±138	
K2-383 b	0.0102±0.0052	0.139^{+0.010}_{−0.009}	1.86596±0.00001		1270	transit		1.061^{+0.459}_{−0.327}	5129±138	
K2-384b	0.0040±0.0026	0.096^{+0.020}_{−0.005}	2.23152^{+0.0019}_{−0.00032}		600	transit		0.330±0.009	3623±138	
K2-384c	0.0054±0.0027	0.106^{+0.004}_{−0.006}	4.19476^{+0.00030}_{−0.00018}		480	transit		0.330±0.009	3623±138	
K2-384d	0.0085±0.0044	0.124^{+0.010}_{−0.006}	6.67958^{+0.00071}_{−0.00049}		410	transit		0.330±0.009	3623±138	
K2-384e	0.0075±0.0042	0.120^{+0.012}_{−0.007}	9.71504^{+0.00100}_{−0.00073}		370	transit		0.330±0.009	3623±138	
K2-384f	0.0179±0.0104	0.198^{+0.008}_{−0.007}	13.62749^{+0.00034}_{−0.00057}		330	transit		0.330±0.009	3623±138	
K2-385 b	0.0100±0.0056	0.137^{+0.012}_{−0.011}	2.38086^{+0.00016}_{−0.00021}		1100	transit	1370±20	0.9270^{+0.4120}_{−0.2860}	4844±138	
K2-386 b	0.0195±0.0115	0.207^{+0.006}_{−0.005}	7.47322^{+0.00037}_{−0.00031}		1010	transit	1400±30	0.911^{+0.088}_{−0.083}	5749±22	
K2-387 b	0.1430±0.0996	0.653±0.023	28.73532±0.00099		340	transit	870±12	0.570^{+0.051}_{−0.048}	3572±138	
K2-388 b	0.0412±0.0263	0.326^{+0.029}_{−0.020}	6.33906^{+0.00022}_{−0.00018}		970	transit	948±13	0.8420^{+0.3760}_{−0.2590}	5367±138	
K2-389 b	0.0177±0.0103	0.195±0.010	8.58404^{+0.00088}_{−0.00202}		1050	transit	846±9	0.8020^{+0.3570}_{−0.2460}	5782±138	
K2-389 c	0.0165±0.0085	0.182^{+0.013}_{−0.012}	20.85133^{+0.00280}_{−0.00298}		780	transit	846±9	0.8020^{+0.3570}_{−0.2460}	5782±138	
K2-390 b	0.0636±0.0390	0.416^{+0.027}_{−0.030}	3.31279±0.00010		1310	transit	1490±18	0.7890^{+0.3510}_{−0.2390}	5558±138	
K2-391 b	0.0078±0.0053	0.122^{+0.025}_{−0.016}	4.62265^{+0.00022}_{−0.00025}		900	transit	1660±50	0.7570^{+0.3410}_{−0.2400}	5543±138	
K2-392 b	0.0140±0.0079	0.165^{+0.014}_{−0.013}	15.39872^{+0.00242}_{−0.00193}		840	transit	1330±30	0.8410^{+0.3700}_{−0.2580}	5726±138	
K2-393 b	0.0199±0.0127	0.210^{+0.015}_{−0.014}	10.41318^{+0.00093}_{−0.00069}		950	transit	867±9	0.8810^{+0.3810}_{−0.2690}	5678±138	
K2-394 b	0.0123±0.0063	0.151^{+0.012}_{−0.011}	5.09571±0.00011		890	transit	319.7±1.5	0.478^{+0.214}_{−0.147}	4938±138	
K2-395 b	0.0240±0.0141	0.231^{+0.017}_{−0.015}	4.80335^{+0.00035}_{−0.00046}		910	transit	935±10	0.9520^{+0.4210}_{−0.2930}	5007±138	
K2-395 c	0.0371±0.0220	0.303^{+0.025}_{−0.022}	8.49128^{+0.00033}_{−0.00030}		750	transit	935±10	0.9520^{+0.4210}_{−0.2930}	5007±138	
K2-396 b	0.0106±0.0061	0.140^{+0.010}_{−0.009}	0.6736±0.00001		1990	transit	897±9	0.9540^{+0.4290}_{−0.2930}	5236±138	
K2-396 c	0.0314±0.0189	0.278^{+0.015}_{−0.010}	25.76051^{+0.00199}_{−0.00188}		590	transit	897±9	0.9540^{+0.4290}_{−0.2930}	5236±138	
K2-397 b	0.0212±0.0127	0.216±0.016	3.57232^{+0.00018}_{−0.00015}		1210	transit	650±5	0.9370^{+0.4060}_{−0.2850}	5387±138	
K2-398 b	0.0191±0.0112	0.203^{+0.010}_{−0.009}	6.39302^{+0.00113}_{−0.00075}		1240	transit	1980±40	0.9450^{+0.0900}_{−0.0830}	5946±20	
K2-398 c	0.0736±0.0412	0.455±0.013	18.78783^{+0.00087}_{−0.00099}		870	transit	1980±40	0.9450^{+0.0900}_{−0.0830}	5946±20	
K2-400 b	0.0051±0.0025	0.103±0.004	3.86505±0.00018		570	transit	203.5±0.8	0.374±0.009	3578±138	
K2-401 b	0.0183±0.0117	0.201^{+0.018}_{−0.017}	6.29309^{+0.00057}_{−0.00070}		660	transit	655±5	0.8700^{+0.3950}_{−0.2690}	4213±138	
K2-402 b	0.0245±0.0149	0.239^{+0.019}_{−0.017}	17.27474^{+0.00259}_{−0.00317}		870	transit	1710±60	0.9440^{+0.4190}_{−0.2900}	5716±138	
K2-403 b	0.0783±0.0515	0.476^{+0.031}_{−0.034}	33.58977±0.00076		580	transit	804±8	0.7840^{+0.3400}_{−0.2410}	5511±138	
K2-404 b	0.0230±0.0127	0.225±0.007	13.11536^{+0.00044}_{−0.00060}		450	transit	397±2	0.552±0.015	3748±138	
K2-405 b	0.0586±0.0342	0.407^{+0.007}_{−0.010}	3.43547±0.00003		980	transit	643±7	1.034^{+0.459}_{−0.314}	4927±138	
K2-406 b	0.063±0.039	0.410^{+0.027}_{−0.026}	22.5494^{+0.00137}_{−0.00143}		720	transit	278±2	0.7980^{+0.3390}_{−0.2450}	5784±138	
K2-407 b	0.0066±0.0035	0.114^{+0.008}_{−0.007}	4.9419^{+0.00066}_{−0.00069}		1110	transit				
K2-407 c	0.0078±0.0044	0.121^{+0.008}_{−0.007}	9.22453^{+0.00132}_{−0.00091}		900	transit				
K2-408 b	0.0122±0.0062	0.149^{+0.010}_{−0.009}	20.97895^{+0.00130}_{−0.00124}		610	transit				
K2-409 b	0.0212±0.0127	0.221^{+0.015}_{−0.014}	1.90808^{+0.00004}_{−0.00005}		1800	transit				
K2-2016-BLG-0005Lb	1.1±0.1			4.4^{+1.9}_{−0.4}	4700^{+3300}_{−700}	microlensing	17000±700	0.58±0.03		On 31 March 2022, K2-2016-BLG-0005Lb was reported to be the most distant exoplanet found by Kepler to date.
Kepler-451 c	1.61±0.14		1460±90	2.1±0.2		timing	1340±20	0.48+0.12		
Kepler-451 d	1.76±0.18		43.0±0.1	0.20±0.03		timing	1340±20	0.48+0.12		
Kepler-1656 c	0.40±0.09		1919^{+27}_{−24}	3.053±0.049		radial vel.		1.03±0.04		
Kepler-1708b	<4.6	0.8886^{+0.0535}_{−0.0526}	737.11310^{+0.00146}_{−0.00770}	1.64±0.10		transit	5436^{+334}_{−298}	1.088±0.072	6157^{+231}_{−202}	Possible exomoon host
Kepler-1972b	0.0064±0.0019	0.072±0.004	7.54425±0.00054			transit	923±3	1.12±0.03	5818±27	Very dense planets, additional planet in system suspected
Kepler-1972c	0.0066±0.0020	0.078±0.005	11.3295±0.0011			transit	923±3	1.12±0.03	5818±27	Very dense planets, additional planet in system suspected
KMT-2016-BLG-1105b	0.007^{+0.023}_{−0.005}			2.44^{+0.88}_{−0.75}		microlensing	17000±7000	0.41^{+0.25}_{−0.21}		
KMT-2017-BLG-0428b	0.018^{+0.011}_{−0.009}			1.81^{+0.55}_{−0.59}		microlensing	18000^{+6000}_{−8000}	0.34^{+0.22}_{−0.17}		
KMT-2017-BLG-0673Lb	3.67^{+2.17}_{−2.07}			2.34^{+0.56}_{−0.74}		microlensing	17000^{+4000}_{−5000}	0.63^{+0.37}_{−0.35}		
KMT-2017-BLG-1003b	0.016^{+0.017}_{−0.009}			1.38^{+0.39}_{−0.32}		microlensing	23000±2000	0.32^{+0.31}_{−0.17}		
KMT-2017-BLG-1194b	0.011±0.006			1.78^{+0.45}_{−0.46}		microlensing	14000±6000	0.41^{+0.23}_{−0.19}		
KMT-2018-BLG-0030b	1.45^{+1.23}_{−0.88}			4.39^{+2.18}_{−2.40}		microlensing	21000^{+4000}_{−6000}	0.51^{+0.43}_{−0.31}		
KMT-2018-BLG-0087b	0.23^{+0.32}_{−0.12}			0.87^{+0.24}_{−0.25}		microlensing	23000^{+3000}_{−4000}	0.10^{+0.14}_{−0.05}		
KMT-2018-BLG-0247b	2.11^{+2.09}_{−1.04}			2.46^{+0.51}_{−0.58}		microlensing	22000^{+3000}_{−4000}	0.29^{+0.28}_{−0.14}		
KMT-2018-BLG-2004b	0.27±\0.12			4.62^{+0.80}_{−1.10}		microlensing	23000^{+3000}_{−4000}	0.69^{+0.32}_{−0.31}		
KMT-2018-BLG-2602b	1.15^{+0.73}_{−0.63}			3.81^{+2.96}_{−2.32}		microlensing	14000±6000	0.66^{+0.42}_{−0.36}		
KMT-2018-BLG-2718b	16.0^{+11.7}_{−8.0}			4.86^{+2.97}_{−2.55}		microlensing	15000^{+10000}_{−7000}	0.82^{+0.57}_{−0.39}		
KMT-2019-BLG-0414Lb	4.57^{+3.74}_{−2.06}			1.16^{+0.47}_{−0.51}		microlensing	14000^{+5000}_{−6000}	0.74^{+0.43}_{−0.38}		
KMT-2019-BLG-1042Lb	0.19^{+0.21}_{−0.11}			1.7±0.5		microlensing	22000^{+3000}_{−5000}	0.30^{+0.34}_{−0.18}		
KMT-2019-BLG-1367b	0.013^{+0.008}_{−0.007}			1.70^{+0.50}_{−0.56}		microlensing	15000^{+8000}_{−7000}	0.25^{+0.16}_{−0.13}		
KMT-2019-BLG-1552Lb	4.05^{+1.73}_{−1.85}			2.6^{+0.6}_{−0.8}		microlensing	15000^{+6000}_{−5000}	0.79^{+0.33}_{−0.36}		
KMT-2019-BLG-1806b	0.015±0.005			3.02^{+0.70}_{−0.73}		microlensing	22000^{+2000}_{−7000}	0.74±0.25		
KMT-2019-BLG-2974Lb	0.28^{+0.29}_{−0.18}			2.0^{+0.8}_{−0.7}		microlensing	20000^{+5000}_{−7000}	0.47^{+0.41}_{−0.28}		
KMT-2021-BLG-0171Lb	0.0352^{+0.0173}_{−0.0142}			3.5^{+1.3}_{−1.0}		microlensing	15000^{+5000}_{−4000}	0.78^{+0.29}_{−0.26}		
KMT-2021-BLG-0240 b	0.40^{+0.07}_{−0.08}			2.5^{+2.8}_{−1.9}		microlensing	23000^{+3000}_{−5000}	0.47^{+0.33}_{−0.24}		Multiple solutions for orbital separation
KMT-2021-BLG-0240 c	0.64^{+0.25}_{−0.24}			1.0^{+1.1}_{−0.8}		microlensing	23000^{+3000}_{−5000}	0.47^{+0.33}_{−0.24}		Multiple solutions for orbital separation
KMT-2021-BLG-0320Lb	0.10^{+0.13}_{−0.07}			1.54^{+0.24}_{−0.30}		microlensing	23000^{+3000}_{−4000}	0.32^{+0.39}_{−0.21}		
KMT-2021-BLG-0748b	0.45^{+0.40}_{−0.25}			2.43±0.67		microlensing	20000^{+3000}_{−4000}	0.36^{+0.32}_{−0.20}		
KMT-2021-BLG-0119Lb	5.97^{+2.94}_{−2.60}			3.23^{+0.76}_{−0.80}		microlensing	11000^{+6000}_{−4000}	0.69^{+0.34}_{−0.30}		Multiple orbital solutions
KMT-2021-BLG-0192Lb	0.19^{+0.09}_{−0.10}			2.07^{+0.35}_{−0.47}		microlensing	22000^{+3000}_{−5000}	0.55^{+0.26}_{−0.28}		Multiple orbital solutions
KMT-2021-BLG-0712b	0.12^{+0.06}_{−0.04}			2.22^{+0.66}_{−0.48}		microlensing	10000^{+3000}_{−2000}	0.22^{+0.12}_{−0.07}		
KMT-2021-BLG-0909b	1.26^{+1.01}_{−0.66}			1.75±0.42		microlensing	21000^{+3000}_{−5000}	0.38^{+0.30}_{−0.20}		
KMT-2021-BLG-1077Lb	0.22^{+0.31}_{−0.12}			1.26^{+1.41}_{−1.08}		microlensing	27000±3000	0.14^{+0.19}_{−0.07}		
KMT-2021-BLG-1077Lc	0.25^{+0.35}_{−0.13}			0.93^{+1.05}_{−0.80}		microlensing	27000±3000	0.14^{+0.19}_{−0.07}		
KMT-2021-BLG-1105b	1.30±0.68			3.54±1.06		microlensing	15000±5000	0.63±0.33		
KMT-2021-BLG-1253b	0.0599^{+0.0643}_{−0.0319}			1.52^{+0.57}_{−0.41}		microlensing	22000^{+3000}_{−4000}	0.24^{+0.26}_{−0.13}		
KMT-2021-BLG-1303Lb	0.38^{+0.22}_{−0.20}			2.89^{+0.44}_{−0.66}		microlensing	20000^{+3000}_{−5000}	0.57^{+0.32}_{−0.29}		Host star also known as MOA-2021-BLG-182
KMT-2021-BLG-1372b	0.1928±0.1129			2.37±0.77		microlensing	19000^{+5000}_{−8000}	0.42±0.25		
KMT-2021-BLG-1391b	0.0143±0.0073			2.29^{+0.56}_{−0.71}		microlensing	19000^{+3000}_{−5000}	0.37±0.19		
KMT-2021-BLG-1554Lb	0.12^{+0.20}_{−0.07}			0.72^{+0.13}_{−0.14}		microlensing	25000^{+3000}_{−4000}	0.08^{+0.13}_{−0.04}		
KMT-2021-BLG-1689Lb	0.145^{+0.094}_{−0.072}			2.5^{+0.8}_{−06}		microlensing	23000^{+2000}_{−4000}	0.58^{+0.33}_{−0.27}		
KMT-2021-BLG-1898 b	0.73^{+0.50}_{−0.40}			1.9^{+0.3}_{−0.5}		microlensing	23000^{+3000}_{−4000}	0.48^{+0.33}_{−0.26}		Possibly a binary star system
KMT-2021-BLG-2294Lb	0.07^{+0.10}_{−0.03}			0.94±0.16		microlensing	22000±3000	0.11^{+0.17}_{−0.06}		Multiple orbital solutions
KMT-2021-BLG-2478b	0.80^{+0.56}_{−0.35}			1.38±0.26		microlensing	8000^{+4000}_{−3000}	0.12^{+0.09}_{−0.06}		
L 363-38 b	0.0147±0.0014		8.781±0.007	0.048±0.006	330	radial vel.	33.31	0.21	3129	Host star also known as Gliese 3049
MOA-2019-BLG-008L b	30					microlensing	8000±2000	0.8		
MOA-2020-BLG-135Lb	0.036^{+0.060}_{−0.021}			1.11^{+0.23}_{−0.20}		microlensing	26000±3000	0.23^{+0.39}_{−0.14}		
MOA-2020-BLG-208Lb	0.217^{+0.116}_{−0.106}			2.88^{+0.40}_{−0.41}		microlensing	25000±3000	0.656^{+0.346}_{−0.322}		
Mu2 Scorpii b	14.4			290		imaging	474	9.1	21900	
Mu2 Scorpii c	18.5			21		imaging	474	9.1	21900	
NGTS-20 b	2.98^{+0.16}_{−0.15}	1.07±0.04	54.18915±0.00015	0.313±0.013	688^{+14}_{−13}	transit	1195±8	1.47±0.09	5980±80	Planet on eccentric orbit, host star also known as TOI-5152
NGTS-21b	2.36±0.21	1.33±0.03	1.5433897±0.0000016	0.0236±0.0005	1357±15	transit	2090^{+90}_{−80}	0.72±0.04	4660±41	
NGTS-23b	0.613±0.097	1.267±0.030	4.0764326±0.0000041	0.0504±0.012	1327^{+17}_{−16}	transit	3230±70	1.01^{+0.06}_{−0.07}	6057±64	
NGTS-24b	0.52^{+0.12}_{−0.11}	1.214^{+0.058}_{−0.062}	3.4678796±0.0000070	0.0479^{+0.0028}_{−0.0030}	1499^{+41}_{−36}	transit	2360±80	1.26^{+0.05}_{−0.21}	5820^{+93}_{−8}	
NGTS-25b	0.639^{+0.058}_{−0.052}	1.023^{+0.035}_{−0.052}	2.8230930±0.0000033	0.0388^{+0.0014}_{−0.002}	1101^{+15}_{−14}	transit	2350±30	0.91^{+0.03}_{−0.04}	5321±58	
OGLE-2016-BLG-1093Lb	0.71±0.12			2.13±0.33		microlensing	26000±2000	0.46±0.08		
OGLE-2017-BLG-1691Lb	0.046^{+0.037}_{−0.025}			2.41^{+0.34}_{−0.44}		microlensing	24000^{+3000}_{−4000}	0.45^{+0.36}_{−0.25}		Host star also known as KMT-2017-BLG-0752
OGLE-2017-BLG-1806b	0.017^{+0.015}_{−0.009}			1.75^{+0.46}_{−0.47}		microlensing	21000^{+3000}_{−5000}	0.38^{+0.34}_{−0.20}		
OGLE-2018-BLG-0298Lb	0.14^{+0.07}_{−0.06}			2.86^{+0.73}_{−0.80}		microlensing	21000^{+3000}_{−4000}	0.69^{+0.34}_{−0.30}		
OGLE-2018-BLG-0932b	0.89^{+0.36}_{−0.31}			1.75^{+0.24}_{−0.23}		microlensing	22000±3000	0.72^{+0.29}_{−0.25}		
OGLE-2018-BLG-1119Lb	0.91^{+0.66}_{−0.52}			4.06^{+2.14}_{−2.58}		microlensing	19000^{+5000}_{−8000}	0.48^{+0.35}_{−0.28}		
OGLE-2018-BLG-1126b	0.056^{+0.033}_{−0.031}			3.23^{+1.29}_{−1.71}		microlensing	19000^{+6000}_{−8000}	0.69^{+0.41}_{−0.38}		
OGLE-2018-BLG-1212b	0.20^{+0.16}_{−0.13}			1.68^{+1.47}_{−0.63}		microlensing	5100^{+4100}_{−1800}	0.16^{+0.12}_{−0.10}		
OGLE-2018-BLG-1367b	0.95^{+0.75}_{−0.44}			3.63^{+1.02}_{−0.96}		microlensing		0.28^{+0.22}_{−0.13}		Multiple solutions for frojected separation
OGLE-2018-BLG-1544b	11.2^{+6.3}_{−5.9}			6.21^{+1.32}_{−2.10}		microlensing	21000^{+4000}_{−7000}	0.62^{+0.38}_{−0.36}		Multiple solutions for frojected separation
OGLE-2018-BLG-1647b	0.97^{+1.78}_{−0.56}			1.36^{+0.20}_{−0.17}		microlensing	26000^{+4000}_{−3000}	0.092^{+0.170}_{−0.053}		
OGLE-2019-BLG-0362Lb	3.26^{+0.83}_{−0.58}			2.18^{+0.58}_{−0.72}		microlensing	19000±2000	0.42^{+0.34}_{−0.23}		Multiple solutions for planetary parameters
OGLE-2019-BLG-1470LABc	2.2^{+1.8}_{−1.3}			3.1^{+1.2}_{−1.1}		microlensing	20000±4000	0.55+0.17		Circumbinary planet
Pi Mensae d	0.0421±0.0042		124.64^{+0.48}_{−0.52}			radial vel.	59.62±0.07	1.11±0.01	6013±18	
Proxima Centauri d	0.0008±0.0002		5.122^{+0.002}_{−0.0036}	0.02885^{+0.00019}_{−0.00022}	360	radial vel.	4.2465±0.0003	0.1221±0.0022	2900±100	
PSR J2007+3120 b	0.0072±0.0009		723±8			timing	22000			Pulsar planet, another planet in the system is suspected.
Ross 508 b	0.0126±0.0019		10.76^{+0.01}_{−0.02}	0.05353^{+0.00047}_{−0.00051}		radial vel.	36.594±0.011	0.1774±0.0045	3071^{+34}_{−22}	Host star also known as Gliese 585, planet close to habitable zone.
TOI-181b	0.127891^{+0.013510}_{−0.025081}	0.631521^{+0.007554}_{−0.009811}	4.532058^{+0.000002}_{−0.000002}	0.055780^{+0.005563}_{−0.003893}	878^{+32}_{−41}	transit	314±2	0.781±0.042	4994±50	
TOI-206 b		0.116±0.004	0.7363104±0.0000003	0.0112±0.0001	910±36	transit	155.9	0.35±0.01	3383±157	
TOI-277 b	0.0239^{+0.0179}_{−0.0098}	0.237±0.016	3.9940±0.0004	0.0269±0.0011		transit	212.6^{+0.6}_{−0.3}	0.16±0.01	4031^{+21}_{−23}	
TOI-500 b		0.104±0.010	0.5481579±0.0000006	0.0128±0.0011	1693±105	transit	154.8	0.88±0.25	4621±50	
TOI-544 b		0.181±0.009	1.5483510±0.0000015	0.0251 ± 0.0019	1082±47	transit	132.7	0.85±0.20	4369±100	
TOI-620 b			5.0988179^{+0.0000045}_{−0.0000046}	0.04825^{+0.00065}_{−0.00066}	603.6^{+5.5}_{−5.3}	transit	107.81±0.19	0.577^{+0.024}_{−0.023}	3708^{+57}_{−56}	
TOI-778 b	2.76±0.24	1.375±0.045	4.633611±0.000001	0.060±0.003	1561^{+33}_{−32}	transit	530±4	1.428±0.094	6715±128	
TOI-833 b		0.113±0.006	1.0418777±0.0000324	0.0171±0.0003	1118±49	transit	136.3	0.61±0.03	3920±160	
TOI-969 b	0.0286±0.0031	0.247±0.033	1.8237305^{+0.0000020}_{−0.0000021}	0.02636±0.00017	941±31	transit	253.8±0.5	0.730±0.037	4550±75	
TOI-969 c	11.3^{+1.1}_{−0.9}		1700^{+290}_{−280}	2.52^{+0.27}_{−0.29}	96.4^{+6.8}_{−5.8}	radial vel.	253.8±0.5	0.730±0.037	4550±75	Eccentric orbit
TOI-1064b	0.0425±0.0055	0.231±0.004	6.443868±0.000025	0.06152^{+0.00086}_{−0.00089}	784±13	transit	224.5±0.2	0.748±0.032	4734±67	
TOI-1064c	0.0079^{+0.0057}_{−0.0063}	0.237±0.004	12.226574^{+0.000046}_{−0.000043}	0.09429^{+0.00132}_{−0.00136}	634±10	transit	224.5±0.2	0.748±0.032	4734±67	
TOI-1075 b		0.154±0.007	0.6047328±0.0000032	0.0118±0.0001	1336±56	transit	200.9	0.60±0.02	3921±157	
TOI-1075 b	0.0313±0.0042	0.160^{+0.010}_{−0.007}	0.6047328±0.0000032	0.01159^{+0.00023}_{−0.00020}	1323±44	transit	200.4^{+0.6}_{−2.2}	0.604±0.030	3875±75	
TOI-1107b	3.35±0.18	1.30±0.05	4.0782387^{+0.0000024}_{−0.0000025}	0.0561^{+0.0024}_{−0.0025}	1728±27	transit	925±7	1.35±0.08	6311±98	
TOI-1136 b	0.0095^{+0.0022}_{−0.0028}	0.170^{+0.019}_{−0.013}	4.1728±0.0002			transit	275.8±0.5	1.022±0.027	5770±50	
TOI-1136 c	0.0189^{+0.0041}_{−0.0053}	0.257±0.005	6.2573±0.0002			transit	275.8±0.5	1.022±0.027	5770±50	
TOI-1136 d	0.0252^{+0.0076}_{−0.0060}	0.413±0.007	12.5194±0.0004			transit	275.8±0.5	1.022±0.027	5770±50	
TOI-1136 e	0.0170±0.0031	0.236^{+0.006}_{−0.008}	18.7992^{+0.0017}_{−0.0015}			transit	275.8±0.5	1.022±0.027	5770±50	
TOI-1136 f	0.0261^{+0.0088}_{−0.0113}	0.346±0.010	26.3162^{+0.0017}_{−0.0013}			transit	275.8±0.5	1.022±0.027	5770±50	
TOI-1136 g	0.0151^{+0.0148}_{−0.0104}	0.226±0.010	39.5387^{+0.0036}_{−0.0030}			transit	275.8±0.5	1.022±0.027	5770±50	
TOI-1181 b	1.18±0.14	1.30±0.08	2.103195^{+0.000012}_{−0.000011}		2162	transit	1013±3	1.38^{+0.086}_{−0.082}	6260±100	Subgiant host star
TOI-1221 b		0.259±0.011	91.68278^{+0.00032}_{−0.00041}	0.404^{+0.026}_{−0.023}	400	transit	447.1±0.7	1.03±0.06	5592±50	
TOI-1246 b	0.0255±0.0035	0.269±0.005	4.30744±0.00002	0.049±0.002	955	transit	557.9±1.0	1.12±0.16	5217±50	
TOI-1246 c	0.0277±0.0038	0.224±0.007	5.904144±0.000083	0.061±0.002	860	transit	557.9±1.0	1.12±0.16	5217±50	
TOI-1246 d	0.0167±0.0053	0.313±0.008	18.65590±0.00048	0.131±0.004	586	transit	557.9±1.0	1.12±0.16	5217±50	
TOI-1246 e	0.0466±0.0072	0.338±0.014	37.9216±0.0010	0.211±0.007	462	transit	557.9±1.0	1.12±0.16	5217±50	
TOI-1260 d	0.0373±0.0245	0.276±0.008	16.608164±0.000083	0.1116±0.0033	499±4	transit	239.5±0.3	0.66±0.01	4227±85	
TOI-1268 b	0.303±0.026	0.81±0.05	8.1577080±0.0000044	0.072^{+0.009}_{−0.010}	919	transit	359.1±0.4	0.92±0.03	5290±117	
TOI-1272 b	0.0774±0.0072	0.370±0.019	3.31599±0.00002	0.0412±0.0008	961±32	transit	450.6±1.3	0.851±0.049	4985±121	
TOI-1288 b	0.0712^{+0.0574}_{−0.0304}	0.454±0.010	2.69998±0.00015	0.0429±0.0006		transit	375.3^{+1.3}_{−0.5}	1.46±0.06	5307^{+18}_{−16}	
TOI-1288 c	0.2643±0.0220		443^{+11}_{−13}			radial vel.	375.3^{+1.3}_{−0.5}	1.46±0.06	5307^{+18}_{−16}	
TOI-1411 b		0.121±0.013	1.4520358±0.0000098	0.0230±0.0026	1136±59	transit	106.0	0.59±0.23	4266±100	
TOI-1422 b	0.0283^{+0.0072}_{−0.0063}	0.354^{+0.012}_{−0.010}	12.9972±0.0006	0.108±0.003	867±17	transit	504.17^{+0.12}_{−0.09}	0.981^{+0.062}_{−0.065}	5840±62	Another planet in the system is suspected.
TOI-1442 b		0.104±0.005	0.4090677±0.0000003	0.0071±0.0002	1072±54	transit	134.5	0.29±0.02	3330±160	
TOI-1452 b	0.0152±0.0041	0.149±0.006	11.06201±0.00002	0.061±0.003	326±7	transit	99.51±0.04	0.249±0.008	3185±50	Also a red dwarf on a 97AU separation in the system
TOI-1468 b	0.0101±0.0008	0.114±0.003	1.8805136^{+0.0000024}_{−0.0000026}		682.2^{+7.4}_{−6.9}	transit	80.64±0.07	0.339±0.011	3496±25	
TOI-1468 c	0.0209±0.0021	0.184±0.004	15.532482^{+0.000034}_{−0.000033}		337.5^{+3.7}_{−3.4}	transit	80.64±0.07	0.339±0.011	3496±25	
TOI-1516 b	3.16±0.12	1.36±0.03	2.056014±0.000002		1820	transit	804.6±1.9	1.085^{+0.061}_{−0.066}	6420±100	
TOI-1669 b	0.0132±0.0085	0.214±0.016	2.7			transit	364.6	1.00±0.05	5542.3±100.0	Host star also known as BD+82 71, planet suspected since 2020
TOI-1669 c	0.602±0.078		501±16			radial vel.	364.6	1.00±0.05	5542.3±100.0	Host star also known as BD+82 71, additional long-period companion is suspected.
TOI-1694 b	0.0979±0.0066	0.461±0.016	3.8			transit	405.7	0.84±0.03	5066±100	Host star also known as TYC 4108-1434-1, planet suspected since 2020
TOI-1694 c	0.929±0.037		393.2±4.3			radial vel.	405.7	0.84±0.03	5066±100	Host star also known as TYC 4108-1434-1
TOI-1670 b	0.04±0.03	0.184^{+0.017}_{−0.013}	10.98462^{+0.00046}_{−0.00051}	0.103±0.002	1062^{+14}_{−13}	transit	540.6^{+1.0}_{−1.2}	1.21±0.02	6170±61	
TOI-1670 c	0.63^{+0.09}_{−0.08}	0.987±0.025	40.74976^{+0.000022}_{−0.00021}	0.249±0.005	684±9	transit	540.6^{+1.0}_{−1.2}	1.21±0.02	6170±61	
TOI-1693 b		0.126±0.009	1.7666957±0.0000054	0.0226±0.0004	764±19	transit	100.6	0.49±0.03	3499±70	
TOI-1695 b	0.0173±0.0031	0.181±0.016	3.1342790±0.0000072	0.033548^{+0.000260}_{−0.000268}	590±90	transit	147.2±0.2	0.51±0.02	3627±31	
TOI-1696 b	0.1781	0.276±0.010	2.500311±0.000004	0.0229±0.0002	489±13	transit	210.8±0.5	0.255±0.0066	3185±76	
TOI-1710 b	0.0890±0.0148	0.477±0.010	24.283429±0.00043	0.16±0.04	687±50	transit	264.7±0.2	0.984^{+0.050}_{−0.059}	5665±55	
TOI-1759 b	0.021±0.06	0.279±0.02	18.849975±0.000006	0.1176±0.0013	433±14	transit	130.85±0.05	0.606±0.020	4065±51	
TOI-1811 b	0.974^{+0.075}_{−0.076}	1.002^{+0.026}_{−0.024}	3.7130818±0.0000028	0.04393^{+0.00058}_{−0.00054}	961.5±8	transit	418±3	0.819^{+0.033}_{−0.030}	4753^{+54}_{−55}	
TOI-1820 b	2.3±0.2	1.12±0.02	4.860700±0.000010	0.069±0.005	1295±11	transit	807±13	1.04±0.13	5734±50	
TOI-1860 b		0.117±0.005	1.0662107±0.0000014	0.0204±0.0002	1885±28	transit	149.8	0.99±0.03	5752±100	
TOI-1937 b	2.01^{+0.17}_{−0.16}	1.247^{+0.059}_{−0.062}	0.94667944±0.00000047	0.01932^{+0.00035}_{−0.00039}	2097^{+35}_{−36}	transit	1366±6	1.072^{+0.059}_{−0.064}	5814^{+91}_{−93}	
TOI-2000 b	0.0324±0.0070	0.236±0.010	3.098331^{+0.000021}_{−0.000019}	0.04260^{+0.00076}_{−0.00067}	1475^{+120}_{−158}	transit	566.3±1.0	1.074^{+0.059}_{−0.050}	5607^{+86}_{−82}	
TOI-2000 c	0.238±0.012	0.711±0.011	9.1270553±0.0000073	0.0875^{+0.0016}_{−0.0014}	1029^{+84}_{−111}	transit	566.3±1.0	1.074^{+0.059}_{−0.050}	5607^{+86}_{−82}	
TOI-2025 b	4.4±0.4	1.120±0.009	8.872086±0.000009	0.089±0.004	1186±11	transit	1106±7	1.32±0.14	5880±53	
TOI-2025 b	3.51^{+0.36}_{−0.35}	1.118^{+0.031}_{−0.030}	8.8720942^{+0.0000080}_{−0.0000079}	0.0886^{+0.0019}_{−0.0024}	1172^{+18}_{−17}	transit	1095±11	1.176^{+0.079}_{−0.091}	5928^{+76}_{−75}	
TOI-2046 b	2.30±0.08	1.44±0.11	1.4971842^{+0.0000031}_{−0.0000033}		1998	transit	940±3	1.153^{+0.100}_{−0.093}	6160±100	Young host star
TOI-2048 b		0.184±0.018	13.79019^{+0.00065}_{−0.00084}		640±20	transit	379.7±0.5	0.83±0.03	5185±60	Young host star belongs to NGC 3532
TOI-2081 b	0.0157^{+0.0151}_{−0.0076}	0.182±0.046	10.50534^{+0.00007}_{−0.00008}	0.0752^{+0.0047}_{−0.0119}	488^{+28}_{−52}	transit	203.26±0.16	0.540±0.080	3800±100	
TOI-2136 b	0.0200^{+0.0077}_{−0.0072}	0.196±0.015	7.851928^{+0.000018}_{−0.000016}	0.057±0.006	395^{+24}_{−22}	transit	108.82±0.07	0.34±0.02	3342±100	
TOI-2145 b	5.35^{+0.32}_{−0.35}	1.103^{+0.031}_{−0.029}	10.261081^{+0.000026}_{−0.000027}	0.1108^{+0.0012}_{−0.0015}	1484^{+16}_{−14}	transit	733±5	1.720^{+0.057}_{−0.068}	6189±67	Host star also known as HIP 86040
TOI-2152A b	2.83^{+0.38}_{−0.37}	1.281^{+0.050}_{−0.046}	3.3773512^{+0.0000060}_{−0.0000061}	0.05064^{+0.00093}_{−0.0011}	1802^{+60}_{−54}	transit	988±13	1.516^{+0.085}_{−0.10}	6630^{+300}_{−290}	Planet orbiting primary of binary star
TOI-2154 b	0.92^{+0.19}_{−0.18}	1.453^{+0.053}_{−0.048}	3.8240801±0.0000025	0.0513^{+0.0011}_{−0.0013}	1580±27	transit	967±10	1.233^{+0.077}_{−0.090}	6280±160	
TOI-2180 b	2.755^{+0.087}_{−0.081}	1.010^{+0.022}_{−0.019}	260.79^{+0.59}_{−0.58}	0.828±0.012	348.0^{+3.3}_{−3.6}	transit	379.4±0.8	1.111^{+0.047}_{−0.046}	5695^{+58}_{−60}	
TOI-2158 b	0.82±0.08	0.960±0.012	8.60077±0.00003	0.075±0.004	1188±10	transit	652±3	1.12±0.12	5673±50	
TOI-2193 b	0.94±0.18	1.77	2.1225735±0.0000016	0.03319^{+0.00052}_{−0.00051}	1763^{+21}_{−22}	transit	1126±3	1.082^{+0.052}_{−0.049}	5974±110	Also 0.54M_{☉} star in the system
TOI-2196 b	0.0818±0.0041	0.313±0.013	1.1947268^{+0.0000079}_{−0.0000093}	0.02234±0.00060	1860±20	transit	861±3	1.032±0.038	5634±31	Neptunian desert planet
TOI-2207 b	0.64^{+0.10}_{−0.12}	0.995^{+0.028}_{−0.027}	8.001968^{+0.000024}_{−0.000025}	0.0854^{+0.0015}_{−0.0016}	1259^{+16}_{−15}	transit	1242±9	1.296^{+0.069}_{−0.072}	6075±110	
TOI-2260 b		0.145±0.012	0.3524728±0.0000047	0.0097±0.0001	2609±86	transit	331.2	0.99±0.04	5534±100	
TOI-2236 b	1.58^{+0.40}_{−0.39}	1.282^{+0.032}_{−0.031}	3.5315902±0.0000026	0.05009^{+0.00080}_{−0.00082}	1688^{+19}_{−21}	transit	1149±5	1.343^{+0.066}_{−0.065}	6164±50	
TOI-2337b	1.60±0.15	0.9±0.1	2.99432±0.00008	0.04467		transit	1780±20	1.325±0.118	4780±100	
TOI-2364 b	0.225^{+0.043}_{−0.049}	0.768^{+0.023}_{−0.018}	4.0197517±0.0000043	0.04871^{+0.00069}_{−0.00079}	1091^{+17}_{−14}	transit	713±6	0.954^{+0.041}_{−0.046}	5306^{+76}_{−68}	
TOI-2411 b		0.150±0.010	0.7826942±0.0000037	0.0144±0.0001	1355±45	transit	194.5	0.65±0.02	4099±123	
TOI-2421 b	0.333±0.079	0.925^{+0.035}_{−0.034}	4.3474032^{+0.0000079}_{−0.0000078}	0.0543^{+0.0021}_{−0.0010}	1534^{+20}_{−28}	transit	1067±7	1.131^{+0.130}_{−0.064}	5577±50	
TOI-2427 b		0.161±0.011	1.3060011±0.0000102	0.0202±0.0002	1117±46	transit	93.1	0.64±0.02	4072±121	
TOI-2445 b		0.112±0.007	0.3711281±0.0000005	0.0064±0.0001	1060±54	transit	158.7	0.25±0.01	3333±157	
TOI-2497 b	5.21±0.52	1.000^{+0.040}_{−0.038}	10.655661±0.000026	0.1167^{+0.0018}_{−0.0017}	1596^{+44}_{−41}	transit	930±14	1.861^{+0.086}_{−0.081}	7360^{+290}_{−270}	
TOI-2567 b	0.201^{+0.034}_{−0.031}	0.975^{+0.031}_{−0.029}	5.983944±0.000013	0.0672^{+0.0024}_{−0.0012}	1352^{+18}_{−19}	transit	1691±8	1.130^{+0.130}_{−0.059}	5650±50	
TOI-2570 b	0.820^{+0.063}_{−0.065}	1.217^{+0.035}_{−0.034}	2.9887615±0.0000022	0.04145^{+0.00081}_{−0.00086}	1431^{+24}_{−23}	transit	1179±6	1.063^{+0.063}_{−0.065}	5765±50	
TOI-2583 b	0.250^{+0.058}_{−0.056}	1.290^{+0.040}_{−0.033}	4.5207265±0.0000049	0.0571^{+0.0010}_{−0.0013}	1456^{+19}_{−16}	transit	1831±9	1.215^{+0.063}_{−0.082}	5936^{+65}_{−68}	
TOI-2587 b	0.218^{+0.054}_{−0.046}	1.077^{+0.042}_{−0.040}	5.456640±0.000011	0.0635^{+0.0025}_{−0.0013}	1445^{+23}_{−26}	transit	1242±10	1.15^{+0.14}_{−0.07}	5760^{+80}_{−79}	
TOI-2669b	0.61±0.19	1.76±0.16	6.2034±0.0001			transit	1294±9	1.19±0.16	4800±100	
TOI-2796 b	0.44^{+0.10}_{−0.11}	1.59	4.8084983^{+0.0000057}_{−0.0000056}	0.0569^{+0.0010}_{−0.0011}	1205^{+18}_{−17}	transit	1150±6	1.063^{+0.057}_{−0.062}	5764^{+81}_{−78}	
TOI-2803 b	0.975^{+0.083}_{−0.070}	1.616^{+0.034}_{−0.032}	1.96229325±0.00000082	0.03185±0.00052	1893^{+29}_{−28}	transit	1635±9	1.118^{+0.056}_{−0.054}	6280^{+99}_{−96}	
TOI-2818 b	0.71±0.26	1.363^{+0.046}_{−0.045}	4.0397090^{+0.0000024}_{−0.0000023}	0.0493^{+0.0010}_{−0.0008}	1376^{+26}_{−24}	transit	1028±3	0.977^{+0.063}_{−0.049}	5721^{+88}_{−83}	
TOI-2842 b	0.370^{+0.052}_{−0.047}	1.146^{+0.051}_{−0.048}	3.5514058^{+0.0000077}_{−0.0000078}	0.0475^{+0.0010}_{−0.0011}	1471^{+29}_{−27}	transit	1501±8	1.135^{+0.077}_{−0.079}	5910±100	
TOI-2977 b	1.68^{+0.26}_{−0.25}	1.174^{+0.031}_{−0.027}	2.3505614±0.0000025	0.03386^{+0.00067}_{−0.00050}	1544±26	transit	1160±30	0.936^{+0.057}_{−0.041}	5691^{+94}_{−93}	
TOI-3023 b	0.62^{+0.10}_{−0.09}	1.466^{+0.043}_{−0.032}	3.9014971±0.0000031	0.0505^{+0.0015}_{−0.0009}	1596^{+24}_{−25}	transit	1281±5	1.12^{+0.11}_{−0.06}	5760^{+85}_{−88}	
TOI-3331 b	2.27±0.16	1.158±0.043	2.0180231^{+0.0000043}_{−0.0000044}	0.03144^{+0.00048}_{−0.00055}	1488^{+31}_{−29}	transit	733±4	1.016^{+0.047}_{−0.052}	5521±110	Also 0.6M_{☉} star in the system
TOI-3364 b	1.67^{+0.12}_{−0.13}	1.091^{+0.038}_{−0.032}	5.8768918±0.0000069	0.0675^{+0.0011}_{−0.0016}	1264^{+22}_{−21}	transit	899±3	1.186^{+0.059}_{−0.083}	5706^{+95}_{−91}	
TOI-3540 b	1.18±0.14	2.10	3.1199990±0.0000079	0.04289^{+0.00092}_{−0.00093}	1498±22	transit	921±10	1.081^{+0.071}_{−0.069}	5969±50	Also 0.8M_{☉} star in the system
TOI-3629 b	0.26±0.02	0.74±0.02	3.936551^{+0.000005}_{−0.000006}	0.043±0.002	690±20	transit	423.1±1.0	0.63±0.02	3870±90	
TOI-3688 b	0.98^{+0.10}_{−0.11}	1.167^{+0.048}_{−0.044}	3.246075±0.000012	0.04560^{+0.00089}_{−0.00098}	1534^{+29}_{−28}	transit	1308±6	1.199^{+0.072}_{−0.076}	5950±100	
TOI-3693 b	1.02^{+0.24}_{−0.22}	1.124^{+0.029}_{−0.023}	9.088516^{+0.000026}_{−0.000027}	0.0813^{+0.0011}_{−0.0012}	801^{+13}_{−12}	transit	576±2	0.867^{+0.036}_{−0.037}	5274±50	
TOI-3714 b	0.70±0.003	1.01±0.03	2.154849±0.000001	0.027±0.001	750±20	transit	367.0^{+0.6}_{−1.3}	0.53±0.02	3660±90	
TOI-3757 b	0.2684±0.0276	1.07^{+0.04}_{−0.05}	3.4387530^{+0.0000039}_{−0.0000040}	0.03845±0.00043	759±13	transit	579±2	0.64±0.02	3913±56	
TOI-3807 b	1.04^{+0.15}_{−0.14}	2.00	2.8989727^{+0.0000038}_{−0.0000039}	0.0421^{+0.0007}_{−0.0011}	1646^{+25}_{−24}	transit	1399±7	1.181^{+0.064}_{−0.092}	5772^{+84}_{−80}	
TOI-3819 b	1.11^{+0.18}_{−0.20}	1.172^{+0.036}_{−0.035}	3.2443141±0.0000055	0.04611^{+0.00069}_{−0.00096}	1633^{+21}_{−19}	transit	1834±17	1.242^{+0.057}_{−0.076}	5859^{+72}_{−71}	
TOI-3884 b	0.0519^{+0.0110}_{−0.0057}	0.563±0.025	4.5445697±0.0000094	0.0354±0.0014	463±12	transit	141.37±0.16	0.2813±0.0067	3269±70	
TOI-3912 b	0.406^{+0.071}_{−0.068}	1.274^{+0.041}_{−0.040}	3.4936264±0.0000038	0.0463^{+0.0012}_{−0.0010}	1512±20	transit	1533±9	1.088^{+0.086}_{−0.070}	5725^{+69}_{−68}	
TOI-3976 b	0.175^{+0.037}_{−0.036}	1.095^{+0.036}_{−0.035}	6.607662^{+0.000016}_{−0.000015}	0.0743^{+0.0013}_{−0.0014}	1295^{+16}_{−14}	transit	1703±8	1.254^{+0.067}_{−0.072}	5975^{+70}_{−69}	
TOI-4087 b	0.73±0.14	1.164^{+0.025}_{−0.024}	3.17748350±0.00000094	0.04469^{+0.00048}_{−0.00054}	1458^{+20}_{−17}	transit	1013±4	1.178^{+0.039}_{−0.042}	6060^{+74}_{−67}	
TOI-4137 b	1.44^{+0.17}_{−0.15}	1.211^{+0.040}_{−0.039}	3.8016122±0.0000065	0.05222^{+0.00089}_{−0.00096}	1570^{+25}_{−24}	transit	1128±7	1.313^{+0.068}_{−0.071}	6134±50	
TOI-4145 b	0.43±0.13	1.187^{+0.032}_{−0.031}	4.0664428±0.0000058	0.04823^{+0.00075}_{−0.00079}	1074^{+19}_{−16}	transit	668.7±1.3	0.905^{+0.043}_{−0.044}	5281^{+86}_{−76}	
TOI-4329b	0.45±0.09	1.50±0.19	2.9223±0.00015			transit	2258±16	1.538±0.049	6000±100	
TOI-4463 b	0.794^{+0.039}_{−0.040}	1.183^{+0.064}_{−0.045}	2.8807198^{+0.0000028}_{−0.0000027}	0.04036^{+0.00074}_{−0.00082}	1395^{+25}_{−22}	transit	579.5±1.8	1.056^{+0.059}_{−0.063}	5640^{+89}_{−82}	
TOI-4479 b	0.0261^{+0.0252}_{−0.0126}	0.252±0.057	1.15890^{+0.00001}_{−0.00002}	0.0164^{+0.0015}_{−0.0029}	861^{+64}_{−103}	transit	262.9±0.3	0.452±0.090	3400±100	
TOI-4562 b	3.29^{+1.88}_{−0.82}	1.072^{+0.044}_{−0.043}	225.11757^{+0.00027}_{−0.00025}	0.771±0.013	349±10	transit	1131±12	1.218^{+0.054}_{−0.048}	6096±32	Highly eccentric orbit
TOI-4582 b	0.53±0.05	0.94^{+0.09}_{−0.12}	31.034±0.001			transit	1242	1.34±0.06	5190±100	Evolved star, eccentric planetary orbit
TOI-4791 b	2.31^{+0.32}_{−0.33}	1.110±0.050	4.280880^{+0.000022}_{−0.000023}	0.0555^{+0.0011}_{−0.0012}	1472^{+26}_{−24}	transit	1051±6	1.242^{+0.072}_{−0.077}	6058^{+99}_{−94}	
TOI-5153 b	3.26^{+0.18}_{−0.17}	1.06±0.04	20.33003±0.00007	0.158±0.006	906±13	transit	1272.336±11	1.24±0.07	6300±80	
TOI-5174 b	0.07801	0.47667	12.214			transit		1.0±0.125		
TOI-5205b	1.08±0.06	1.03±0.03	1.630757±0.000001	0.0199±0.0002	737±15	transit	283.35±0.16	0.392±0.015	3430±54	
TOI-5542 b	1.32±0.10	1.009^{+0.036}_{−0.035}	75.12375^{+0.00019}_{−0.00018}	0.332±0.016	441^{+48}_{−74}	transit	1154±12	0.890^{+0.056}_{−0.031}	5700±80	
Berry 37a	0.69^{+0.47}_{−0.43}	1.41±0.14	5.616531±0.000023	0.066±0.007	961.5±8	transit	20±60	1.32±0.09	4200±140	
TYC 2187-512-1 b	0.33±0.02		691.90^{+8.77}_{−8.61}	1.22±0.02		radial vel.	50.512±0.016	0.498±0.019	3734±54	
WASP-132c	0.165±0.009		1.011534±0.000005	0.0182±0.0003		transit	390	0.782±0.034	4714^{+87}_{−88}	

== Specific exoplanet lists ==
Lists of exoplanets

- List of directly imaged exoplanets
- List of exoplanet extremes
- List of exoplanet firsts
- List of exoplanets discovered by the Kepler space telescope
- List of exoplanets observed during Kepler's K2 mission
- List of exoplanets discovered by the TESS mission
- List of extrasolar candidates for liquid water
- List of terrestrial exoplanet candidates for atmosphere detection
- List of hottest exoplanets
- List of coldest exoplanets
- List of multiplanetary systems
- List of circumbinary planets
- List of nearest exoplanets
- List of nearest terrestrial exoplanet candidates
- List of potentially habitable exoplanets
- List of proper names of exoplanets
- List of largest exoplanets
- List of smallest exoplanets
- List of transiting exoplanets
- List of exoplanets and planetary debris around giant stars
- List of exoplanets and planetary debris around white dwarfs
- List of extrasolar planetary collisions

=== Lists of exoplanets by year of discovery ===
- List of exoplanets discovered before 2000 (31)
- List of exoplanets discovered between 2000–2009 (375)
- List of exoplanets discovered in 2010 (109)
- List of exoplanets discovered in 2011 (179)
- List of exoplanets discovered in 2012 (149)
- List of exoplanets discovered in 2013 (149)
- List of exoplanets discovered in 2014 (869)
- List of exoplanets discovered in 2015 (144)
- List of exoplanets discovered in 2016 (1498)
- List of exoplanets discovered in 2017 (152)
- List of exoplanets discovered in 2018 (300)
- List of exoplanets discovered in 2019 (169)
- List of exoplanets discovered in 2020 (256)
- List of exoplanets discovered in 2021 (253)
- List of exoplanets discovered in 2022 (312)
- List of exoplanets discovered in 2023 (304)
- List of exoplanets discovered in 2024 (284)
- List of exoplanets discovered in 2025 (138)
- List of exoplanets discovered in 2026 (158)
