= UY Sextantis =

Subdwarf B star in the constellation Sextans

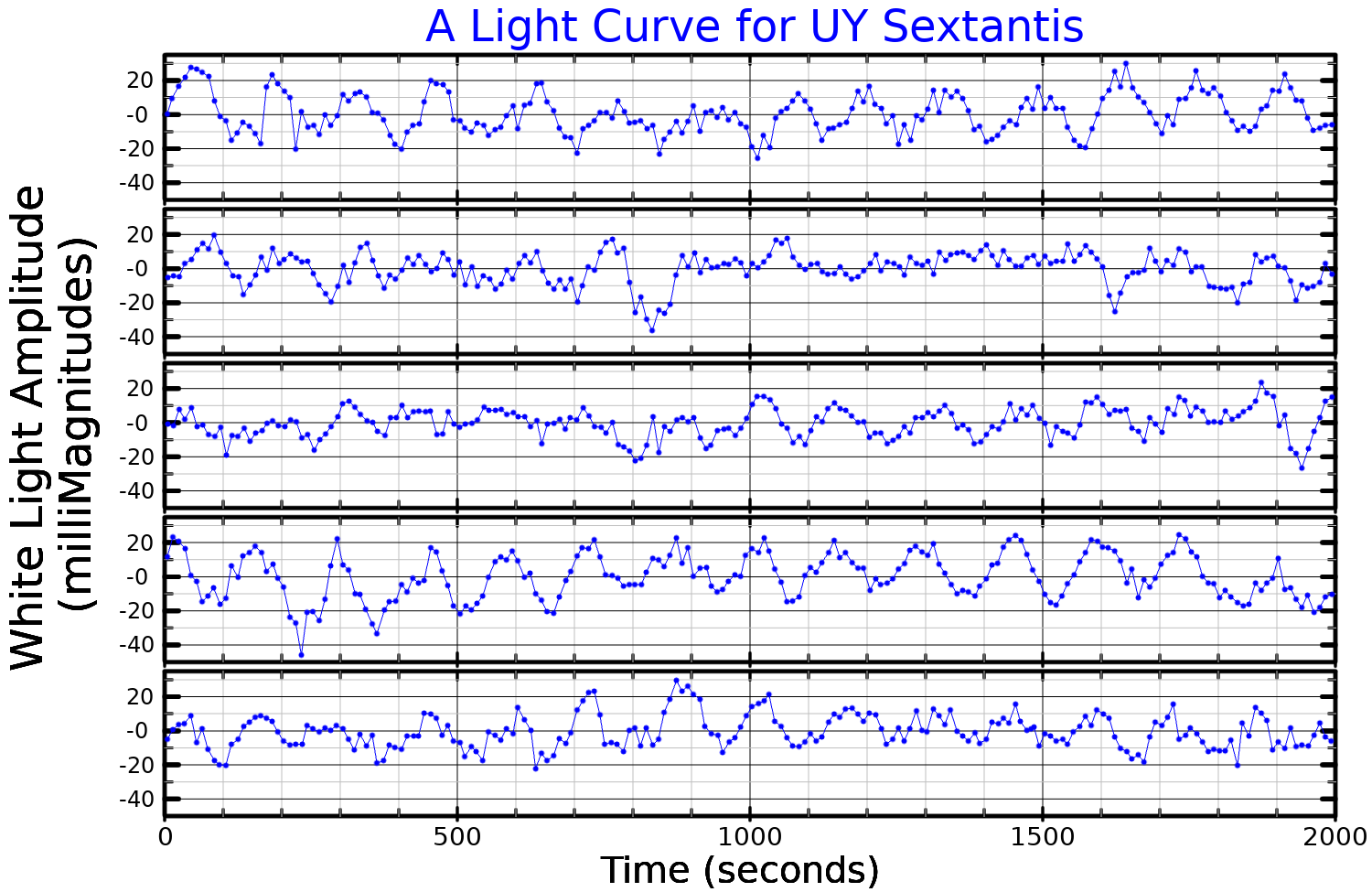
- A white light light curve for UY Sextantis, adapted from Billeres et al. (1997). All five panels form a single 10,000 second light curve, with the top panel continued on the second panel, etc.

Observation data Epoch J2000.0 Equinox ICRS
- Constellation: Sextans
- Right ascension: 10^{h} 50^{m} 02.826^{s}
- Declination: −00° 00′ 36.88″
- Apparent magnitude (V): 13.49

Characteristics
- Evolutionary stage: horizontal branch
- Spectral type: sdO9VII:He6
- Variable type: V361 Hya

Astrometry
Radial velocity (R_{v})	13.6 km/s
Proper motion (μ)	RA: −20.528 mas/yr Dec.: −38.421 mas/yr
Parallax (π)	1.4559±0.0789 mas
Distance	2,200 ± 100 ly (690 ± 40 pc)

Details
Mass	0.490±0.014 M_{☉}
Radius	0.17±0.01 R_{☉}
Luminosity	25.86^{+3.28}_{−2.61} L_{☉}
Surface gravity (log g)	5.83±0.01 cgs
Temperature	34,850±90 K
Rotation	24.6±3.5 d

Other designations
- UY Sex, GSC 04914-00003, 2MASS J10500281-0000369, PG 1047+003

Database references
SIMBAD	data

UY Sextantis is a blue-white subdwarf star, located in the constellation of Sextans. The star is classed as member of the V361 Hydrae type (or also called sdBV_{r} type) class of pulsators in the field of asteroseismology, although it is now generally classified as class O. No additional stellar companion has been detected in tight orbit or imaged around the subdwarf star. It is thought to be an extreme horizontal-branch star, fusing helium in its core and with an unusually thin hydrogen atmosphere causing it to be hotter than most horizontal-branch stars.

The star's variability was discovered in 1998 by D. O'Donoghue et al.. It was given its variable star designation in 2000. It has an apparent magnitude of 13.5 and the brightness changes amount to less than 0.1 magnitudes, with a typical period of 142 seconds.
