= V391 Pegasi =

Star in the constellation Pegasus

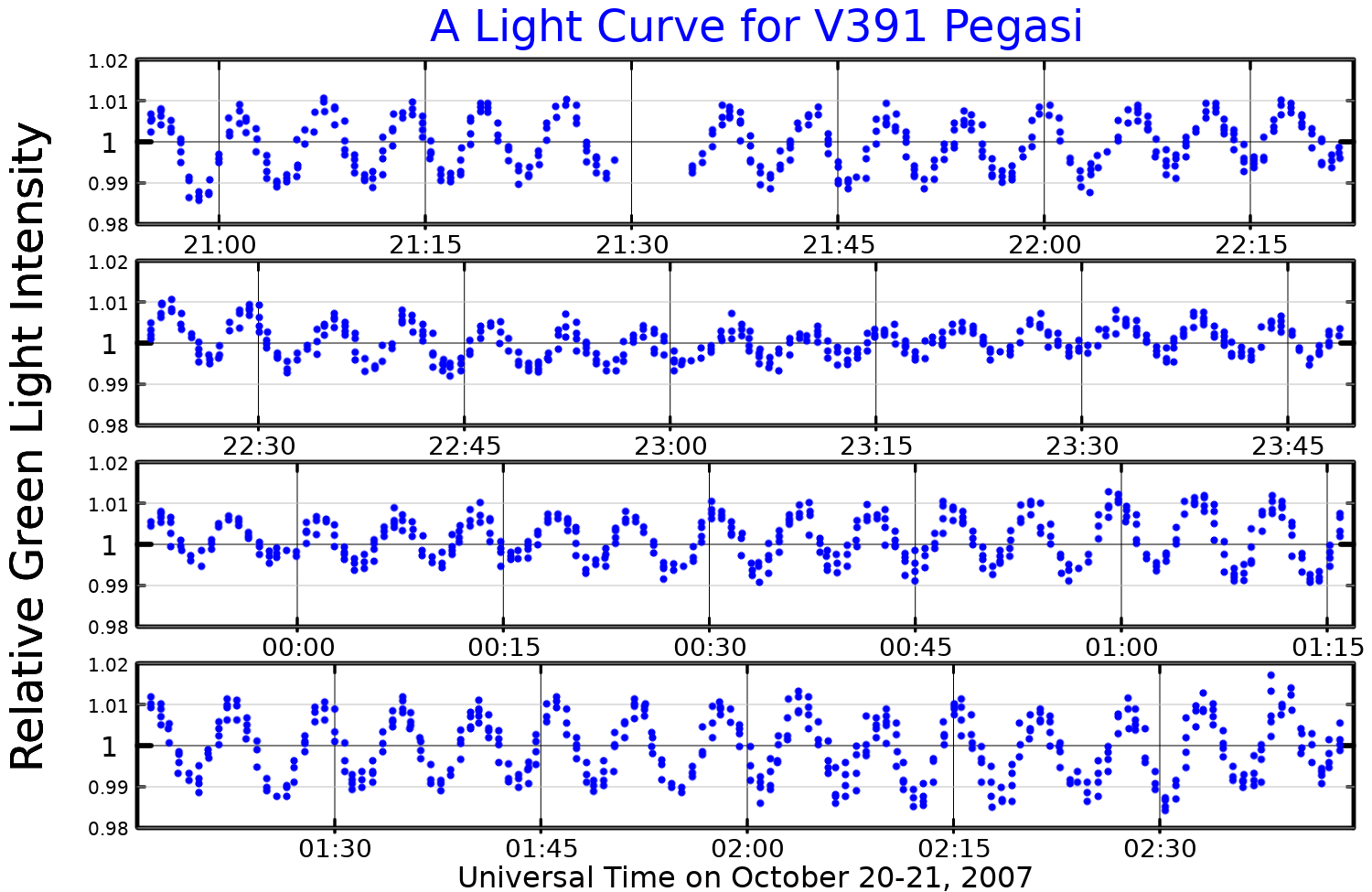
- A light curve for V391 Pegasi, adapted from Silvotti et al. (2010)

Observation data Epoch J2000.0 Equinox ICRS
- Constellation: Pegasus
- Right ascension: 22^{h} 04^{m} 12.1045^{s}
- Declination: +26° 25′ 07.819″
- Apparent magnitude (V): +14.61

Characteristics
- Evolutionary stage: horizontal branch
- Spectral type: sdB
- Variable type: V361 Hydrae (sdBV_{r})

Astrometry
Proper motion (μ)	RA: −4.906(40) mas/yr Dec.: −3.703(34) mas/yr
Parallax (π)	0.7388±0.0327 mas
Distance	4,400 ± 200 ly (1,350 ± 60 pc)
Absolute magnitude (M_{V})	+3.88

Details
Mass	0.47 M_{☉}
Radius	0.23 R_{☉}
Luminosity	34 L_{☉}
Surface gravity (log g)	5.4±0.1 cgs
Temperature	29,300±500 K
Age	>10 Gyr

Other designations
- HS 2201+2610, 2MASS J22041211+2625078

Database references
SIMBAD	data

V391 Pegasi, also catalogued as HS 2201+2610, is a blue-white subdwarf star approximately 4,400 light-years away in the constellation of Pegasus. The star is classified as an "extreme horizontal branch star". It is small, with only half the mass and a bit less than one quarter the diameter of the Sun. It has luminosity 34 times that of the Sun. It could be quite old, perhaps in excess of 10 Gyr. It is believed that the star's mass when it was still on the main sequence was between 0.8 and 0.9 times that of the Sun.

In 2001, Roy Østensen et al. announced that the star, then called HS 2201+2610, is a variable star. It was given its variable star designation, V391 Pegasi, in 2003. It is a pulsating variable star of the V361 Hydrae type (or also called sdBV_{r} type).

== Formation ==
Subdwarf B stars such as V391 Pegasi are thought to be the result of the ejection of the hydrogen envelope of a red giant star at or just before the onset of helium fusion. The ejection left only a tiny amount of hydrogen on the surface—less than 1/1000 of the total stellar mass. The future for the star is to eventually cool down to make a low-mass white dwarf. Most stars retain more of their hydrogen after the first red giant phase, and eventually become asymptotic giant branch stars. The reason that some stars, like V391 Pegasi, lose so much mass is not well known. At the tip of the red-giant branch, the red giant precursors of the subdwarf stars reach their maximum radius, on the order of 0.7 AU. After this point, the hydrogen envelope is lost and helium fusion begins—this is known as the helium flash.

== Hypothesized planetary system ==
In 2007, research using the variable star timing method indicated the presence of a gas giant planet orbiting V391 Pegasi. This planet was designated V391 Pegasi b. This planet around an "extreme horizontal branch" star provided clues about what could happen to the planets in the Solar System when the Sun turns into a red giant within the next 5 billion years.

However, subsequent research published in 2018, taking the large amount of new photometric time-series data amassed since the publication of the original data into account, found evidence both for and against the exoplanet's existence. Although the planet's existence was not disproved, the case for its existence was now certainly weaker, and the authors stated that it "requires confirmation with an independent method."

The V391 Pegasi planetary system
Companion (in order from star)	Mass	Semimajor axis (AU)	Orbital period (days)	Eccentricity	Inclination (°)	Radius
b (unconfirmed)	>3.2±0.7 M_{J}	1.7±0.1	1170±44	0.00	—	—

== Sources ==
- C. S. Jeffery (2005). "Pulsations in Subdwarf B Stars". Journal of Astrophysics and Astronomy. 26 (2–3): 261–271. Bibcode:2005JApA...26..261J. doi:10.1007/BF02702334. S2CID 13814916.
