= Kepler-429 =

Subdwarf B star

Observation data Epoch J2000.0 Equinox J2000.0 (ICRS)
- Constellation: Lyra
- Right ascension: 19^{h} 09^{m} 33.4137^{s}
- Declination: +46° 59′ 04.108″
- Apparent magnitude (V): 14.69 (var.)

Characteristics
- Evolutionary stage: Subdwarf B star
- Spectral type: sdB
- Apparent magnitude (J): 16.36±0.10
- Variable type: V361 Hya

Astrometry
Proper motion (μ)	RA: 1.133 mas/yr Dec.: −5.907 mas/yr
Parallax (π)	0.5573±0.0372 mas
Distance	5,900 ± 400 ly (1,800 ± 100 pc)

Details
Mass	0.47 M_{☉}
Radius	0.24 R_{☉}
Luminosity	3.54 L_{☉}
Surface gravity (log g)	5.35 cgs
Temperature	27,500 K
Metallicity [Fe/H]	0.0 dex

Other designations
- Kepler-429, KIC 10001893, 2MASS J19093340+4659041, Gaia DR2 2130473176626619136

Database references
SIMBAD	data
Exoplanet Archive	data

Kepler-429 (KIC 10001893) is a variable subdwarf B star in the constellation Lyra, about 5,900 light years away.

The brightness of Kepler-429 changes unpredictably by up to 0.13 magnitudes. It has been classified as a V361 Hydrae variable, but also as a V1093 Herculis variable, which typically has slower variations and a cooler temperature. Over 100 pulsation modes were identified with periods from 256 seconds to over three hours.

== Planetary system ==
Kepler-429 has been reported to have three possible exoplanets, though their existence is questioned. They were detected by orbital brightness modulation.

The KIC 10001893 planetary system
Companion (in order from star)	Mass	Semimajor axis (AU)	Orbital period (days)	Eccentricity	Inclination (°)	Radius
b (unconfirmed)	—	0.005541	0.21970	0	—	—
c (unconfirmed)	—	0.007197	0.32528	0	—	—
d (unconfirmed)	—	0.01324	0.81161	0	—	—

== See also ==
- Kepler-70
