= TOI-3757 b =

Exoplanet known for its low density

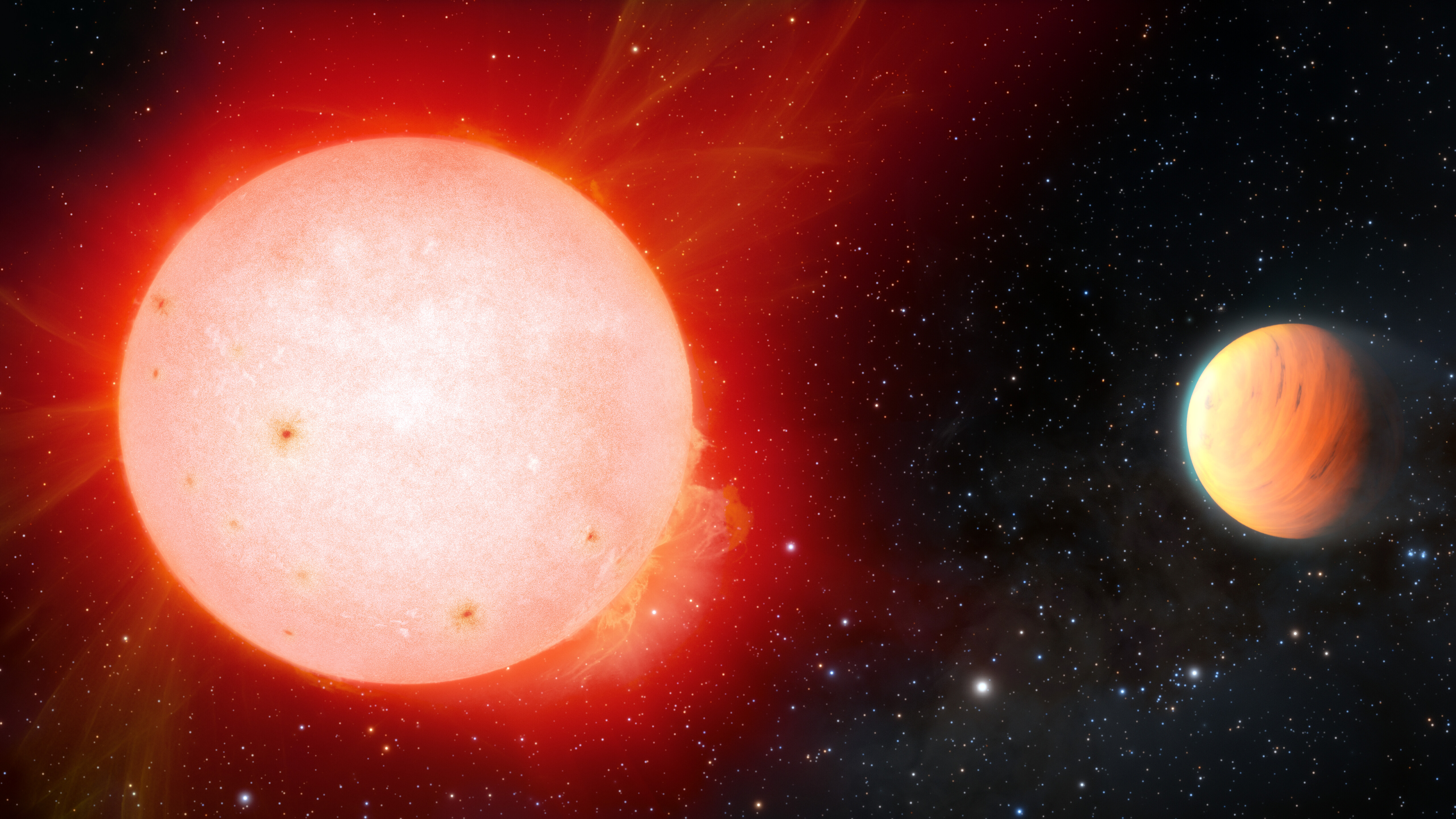
- Artistic representation of TOI-3757b

Discovery
- Discovered by: Kanodia et al.
- Discovery date: 2022
- Detection method: Transit

Orbital characteristics
- Semi-major axis: 0.03845±0.00043 AU
- Eccentricity: 0.14±0.06
- Orbital period (sidereal): 3.438753±0.000004 d
- Inclination: 86.76+0.20 −0.23°
- Argument of perihelion: 130±23°
- Star: TOI-3757

Physical characteristics
- Mean radius: 12.0+0.4 −0.5 R_{🜨}
- Mass: 85.3+8.8 −8.7 M_{🜨}
- Mean density: 0.27+0.05 −0.04 g/cm^{3}
- Temperature: 759±13 K (Note: assuming the planet is a black body and albedo is 0 with perfect energy redistribution)

TOI-3757 b is a gas giant exoplanet located in the constellation of Auriga 578 light years, or 177 parsecs, away from Earth. TOI-3757 is a M0 red dwarf star, which are very rare hosts for gas giant planets. TOI-3757b has a small orbit, having a semimajor axis at 0.04 astronomical units and an orbital period of just 3 days. The planet has a mass of only 0.27 Jupiter masses but a radius of 1.07 Jupiter radii, resulting in its extremely low density.

This body is well known for having a low density; as a result, it has been monikered the 'fluffiest planet ever' and the 'marshmallow world'. Its density is 0.27+0.05
−0.04 g/cm^{3}, so low that it could (figuratively) float in a bathtub large enough to hold it. It is the least dense planet discovered around a red dwarf star, and also has the lowest metallicity of a gas giant around a red dwarf.

== See also ==
- List of exoplanets discovered in 2022
