= HD 83443 b =

Extrasolar planet in the constellation Vela

HD 83443 b / Buru
Discovery
- Discovered by: Mayor et al.
- Discovery site: France
- Discovery date: April 15, 2000
- Detection method: Doppler Spectroscopy

Orbital characteristics
- Semi-major axis: 0.039 AU (5,800,000 km)
- Eccentricity: 0.013 ± 0.013
- Orbital period (sidereal): 2.98565 ± 0.00003 d
- Time of periastron: 2,451,497.5 ± 0.3
- Argument of periastron: 11 ± 11
- Semi-amplitude: 56.3 ± 1.4
- Star: HD 83443

HD 83443 b is an extrasolar planet approximately 134 light-years away in the constellation of Vela. It was discovered in 2000 by the Geneva Extrasolar Planet Search Team led by Michel Mayor. It has a minimum mass comparable to Saturn, and its orbit is one of the shortest known, 1/25th that of Earth's. It takes only three days to complete one revolution around the star.

The planet HD 83443 b is named Buru. The name was selected in the NameExoWorlds campaign by Kenya, during the 100th anniversary of the IAU. Buru means dust in the Dholuo language.
