= NY Virginis =

Binary star in the constellation Virgo

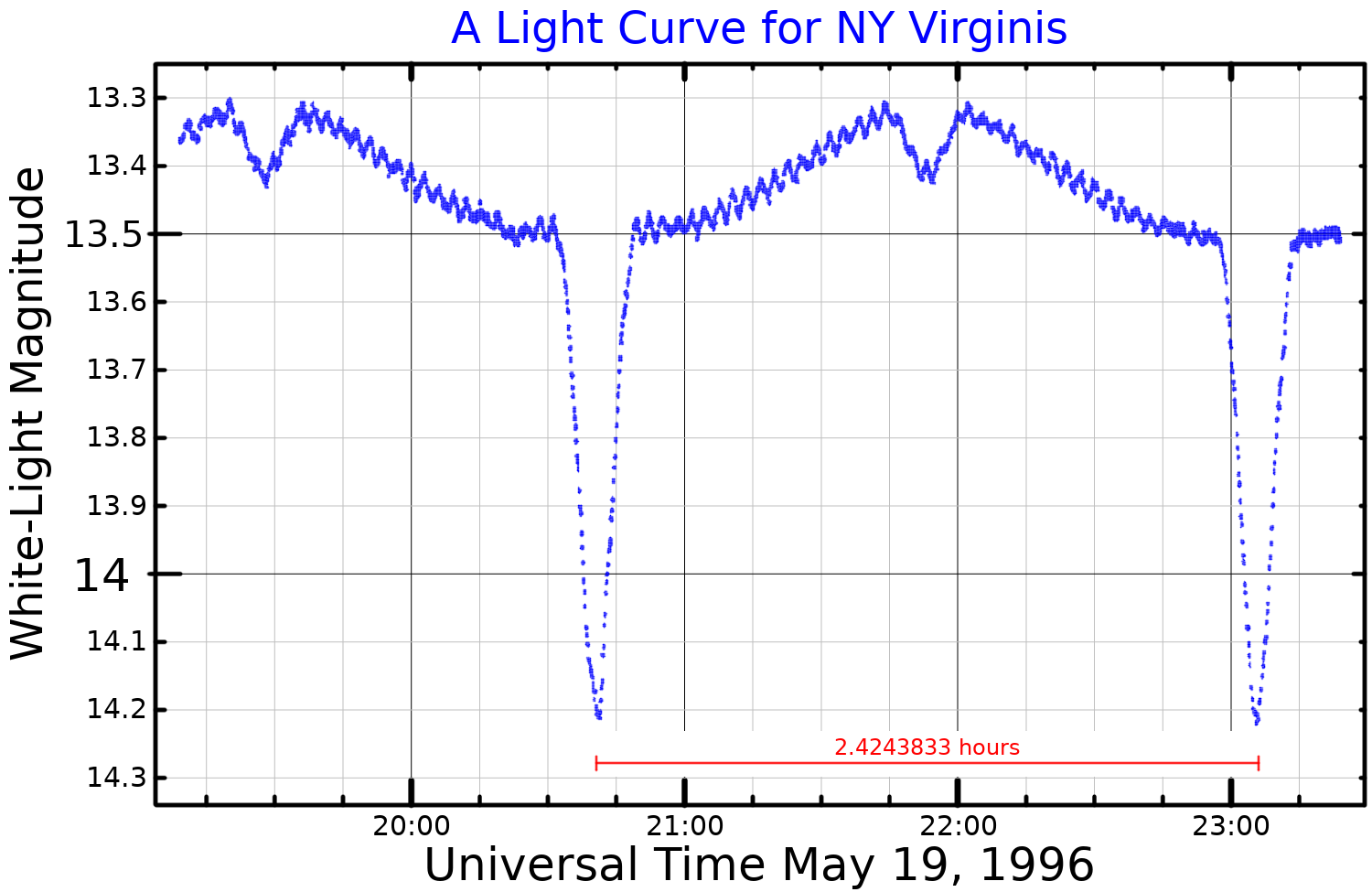
- A light curve for NY Virginis, adapted from Kilkenny et al. (1998). The deep drops in brightness are caused by eclipses, and the higher frequency low-amplitude oscillation arises from the rapid pulsation of the B-type subdwarf.

Observation data Epoch J2000 Equinox ICRS
- Constellation: Virgo
- Right ascension: 13^{h} 38^{m} 48.14669^{s}
- Declination: −02° 01′ 49.2073″
- Apparent magnitude (V): 13.30 - 14.22

Characteristics
- Spectral type: sdB + M5
- Variable type: EA + RPHS

Astrometry
Radial velocity (R_{v})	−25.0 km/s
Proper motion (μ)	RA: −6.145±0.054 mas/yr Dec.: −12.054±0.025 mas/yr
Parallax (π)	1.6801±0.0376 mas
Distance	1,940 ± 40 ly (600 ± 10 pc)
Absolute magnitude (M_{V})	4.49

Orbit
Primary	NY Virginis A
Name	NY Virginis B
Period (P)	0.101015968166 d
Semi-major axis (a)	0.0160 AU
Eccentricity (e)	0.46

Details

NY Virginis A
Mass	0.471±0.006 M_{☉}
Radius	0.1474±0.0009 R_{☉}
Luminosity	23.3±1.5 L_{☉}
Surface gravity (log g)	5.76 cgs
Temperature	32,850±175 K
Rotation	2.42438 hours

NY Virginis B
Mass	0.13 M_{☉}
Radius	0.155 R_{☉}
Surface gravity (log g)	5.16 cgs
Temperature	3,000 K

Other designations
- GSC 04966-00491, 2MASS J13384814-0201491, Gaia DR2 3637481302758519040, PG 1336−018

Database references
SIMBAD	data

NY Virginis is a binary star about 1,940 light-years away. The primary belongs to the rare class of subdwarf B stars, being former red giants with their hydrogen envelope completely stripped by a stellar companion. The companion is a red dwarf star. The eclipsing binary nature of NY Virginis was first identified in 1998, and the extremely short orbital period of 0.101016 d, together with brightness variability on the timescale of 200 seconds was noticed, resulting in the identification of the primary star as a B-type subdwarf in 2003. Under a proposed classification scheme for hot subdwarfs it would be class sdB1VII:He1. This non-standard system indicates that it is a "normal" luminosity for a hot subdwarf and that the spectrum is dominated by hydrogen rather than helium.

== Planetary system ==
In 2011, variations in the timing of the binary star's eclipses were used to infer the presence of a superjovian planet, NY Virginis (AB) b, on a wide orbit, with a second planet being suspected. A study in 2014 found that a two-planet model was preferred. The orbits of these two planets are near or at a 3:10 mutual orbital resonance. Another two-planet model with significant orbital eccentricity, updated to account for changes in eclipse timing not predicted by previous models, was published in 2019.

Studies in 2022 have noted that since planetary models generally fail to predict subsequent changes in eclipse timing, and the most recent two-planet model as of 2021 results in orbits that are unstable on an astronomically-short timescale.

However, in 2023 another model with circular orbits was proposed, which gives stability to the system. The same team also find that it is valid that there are exoplanets in the system creating the eclipe timing variations, and that the moderate eccentricites of the previous model likely caused the orbital instability.

In 2025 it was found that all models fail to predict new changes in eclipse timing. While this does not rule out the existence of the planets, it is possible that multiple mechanisms are responsible for the ETVs.

The NY Virginis planetary system
Companion (in order from star)	Mass	Semimajor axis (AU)	Orbital period (days)	Eccentricity	Inclination (°)	Radius
b (controversial)	>2.164+0.100 −0.099 M_{J}	>3.540+0.038 −0.036	3140+50 −48	0	—	—
c (controversial)	>3.939+0.159 −0.113 M_{J}	>6.52+0.22 −0.18	8309+398 −326	0	—	—
