= V391 Pegasi b =

Gas giant

Discovery
- Discovered by: Silvotti et al.
- Discovery site: Naples, Italy
- Discovery date: March 2007
- Detection method: Variable star timing

Orbital characteristics
- Semi-major axis: 1.7 ± 0.1 AU (254,000,000 ± 15,000,000 km)
- Eccentricity: 0
- Orbital period (sidereal): 1,170 ± 44 d
- Time of periastron: 2,452,418 ± 96
- Argument of periastron: 23.5 ± 7.0
- Semi-amplitude: 76.7
- Star: V391 Pegasi

Physical characteristics
- Mass: >3.2±0.7 M_{J}

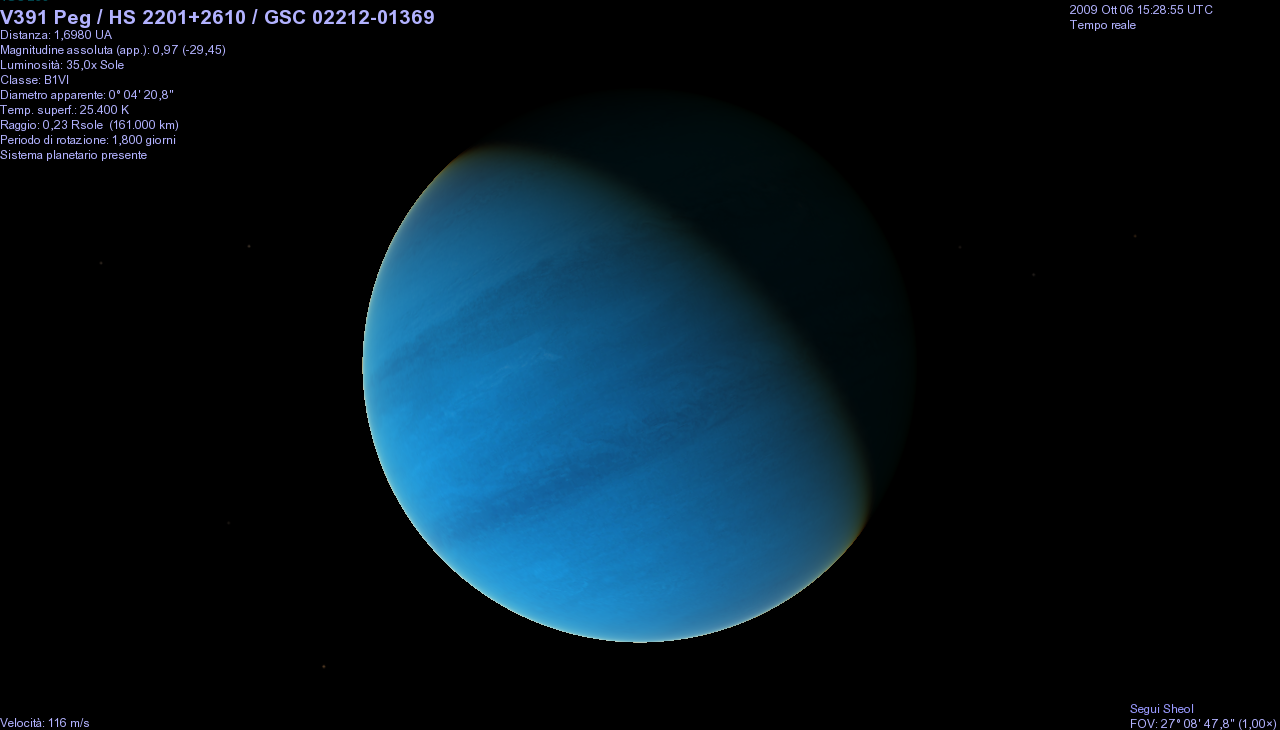
Artistic rendering of V391 Pegasi b

V391 Pegasi b, also known as HS 2201+2610 b, is an extrasolar planet candidate orbiting the star V391 Pegasi approximately 4,570 light-years away in the constellation of Pegasus. The candidate planet was discovered by means of variable star timing, which measured anomalies in variability of the star caused by a planet. It is the first planet candidate to claim to be detected with this method. The discovery reported the planet candidate to have mass of 3.2 times Jupiter's (assuming an edge-on orbit), semi-major axis of 1.7 AU, and orbital period of 1,170 days.

The planet candidate was discovered in March 2007 and published in September 2007. If it is confirmed, its survival would indicate that planets at Earth-like distances can survive their star's red-giant phase, though this is a much larger planet than Earth (about the same size as Jupiter and Saturn). Its existence has been called into question with further monitoring of the pulsations of the star which show deviations from the predicted behavior if this were in fact a planet. The variations in the pulsations may be due to unknown stellar variability.
