= K2-2016-BLG-0005Lb =

Jupiter-like exoplanet

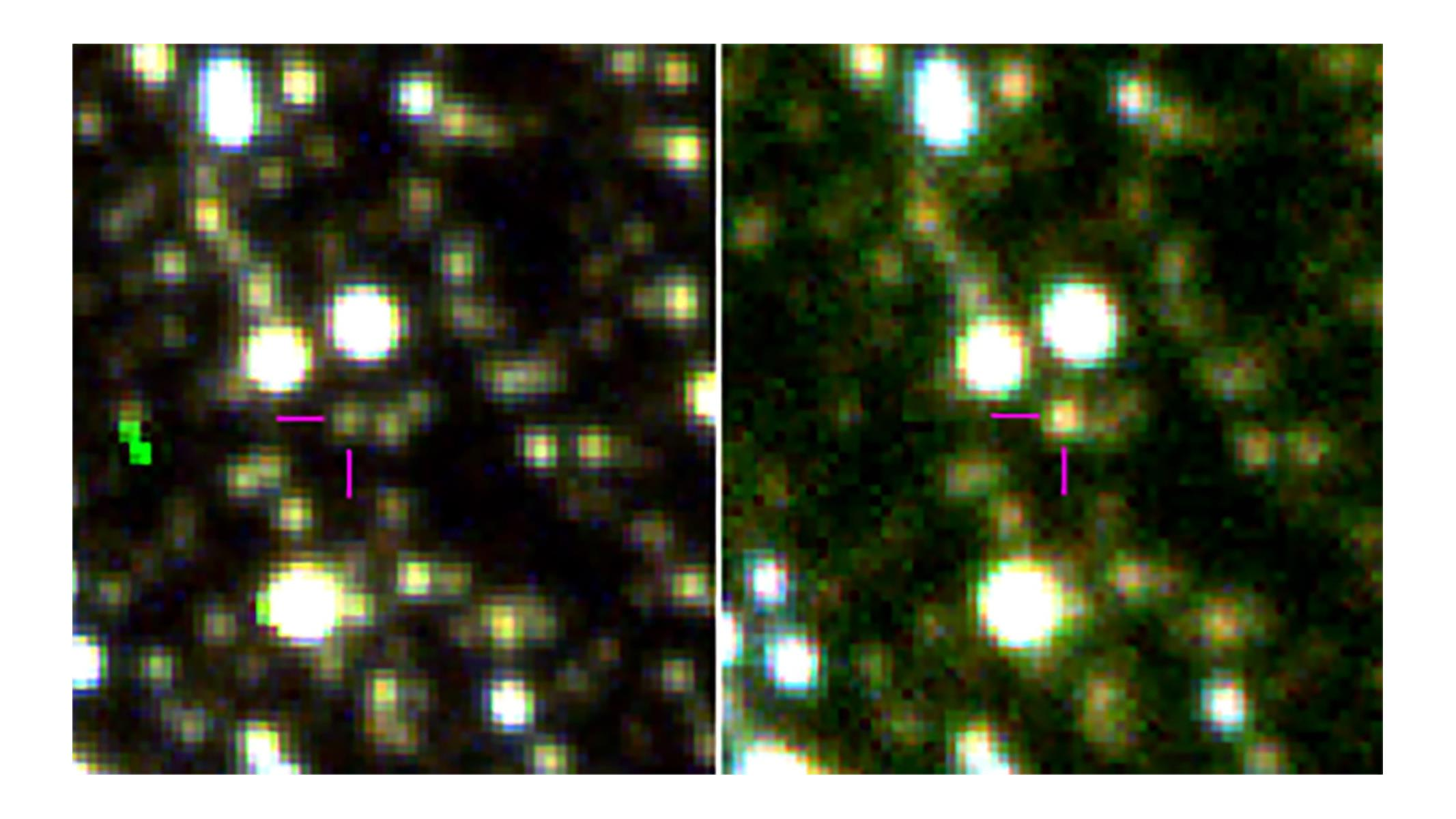
- Images from the Canada-France-Hawaii Telescope showing the difference in brightness of a star during the passage of the microlensing created by the exoplanet and its host star.

Discovery
- Discovered by: Kepler space telescope: Second light
- Discovery date: March 31, 2022
- Detection method: Gravitational microlensing

Orbital characteristics
- Semi-major axis: 4.16 AU
- Star: K2-2016-BLG-0005L

Physical characteristics
- Mean radius: 1.23 R_{J}
- Mass: 1.1 M_{J}

K2-2016-BLG-0005Lb is a distant exoplanet discovered by the Kepler space telescope. Its distance is estimated at 16,960 ly from the Earth, being discovered on January 4, 2022, thanks to an effect of gravitational microlensing from a series of data recorded in 2016, then revealed on March 31, 2022.

== Star ==
K2-2016-BLG-0005Lb orbits a dwarf star less massive than the Sun, named K2-2016-BLG-0005L. Its mass is estimated at 0.584 ± 0.03 solar masses.

== Characteristics ==
The exoplanet is almost an exact twin of Jupiter. It is of similar mass and orbits at almost the same orbital distance. The power of the gravitational lens allowed the team to determine that the exoplanet is about 1.1 Jovian mass, and was a projected at a distance of 4.2 astronomical units from its star at the time of observation, the average orbital distance of Jupiter being 5.2 astronomical units.

== See also ==
- Exoplanet
- List of exoplanets discovered in 2023
- Gravitational microlensing
- Kepler Space Telescope
