= TOI-1136 =

Star in the constellation Draco

Observation data Epoch J2000 Equinox ICRS
- Constellation: Draco
- Right ascension: 12^{h} 48^{m} 44.37261^{s}
- Declination: +64° 51′ 19.1475″
- Apparent magnitude (V): 9.534

Characteristics
- Evolutionary stage: Main sequence
- Spectral type: G5
- Apparent magnitude (B): 10.16±0.03
- Apparent magnitude (V): 9.534±0.003
- Apparent magnitude (G): 9.376±0.003
- Apparent magnitude (J): 8.363±0.020
- Apparent magnitude (H): 8.088±0.018
- Apparent magnitude (K): 8.034±0.021

Astrometry
Radial velocity (R_{v})	7.51±0.20 km/s
Proper motion (μ)	RA: 1.216 mas/yr Dec.: -10.045 mas/yr
Parallax (π)	11.8236±0.0108 mas
Distance	275.9 ± 0.3 ly (84.58 ± 0.08 pc)

Details
Mass	1.022±0.027 M_{☉}
Radius	0.968±0.036 R_{☉}
Surface gravity (log g)	4.47±0.04 cgs
Temperature	5770±50 K
Metallicity [Fe/H]	0.07±0.06 dex
Rotation	8.42±0.09 d
Rotational velocity (v sin i)	6.7±0.6 km/s
Age	700±150 Myr

Other designations
- BD+65 902, SAO 15908, PPM 18379, TOI-1136, TIC 142276270, TYC 4165-581-1, GSC 04165-00581, 2MASS J12484436+6451191

Database references
SIMBAD	data
Exoplanet Archive	data

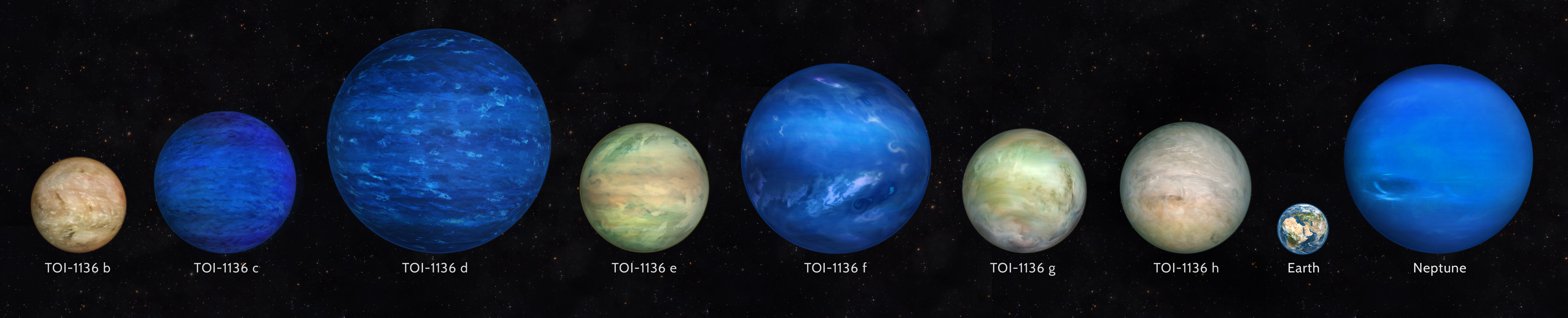
Artist's impression of known planets in the TOI-1136 system and their size comparison with Earth and Neptune

TOI-1136 is a G-type main-sequence star 276 light-years (85 parsecs) away in the constellation of Draco. It is slightly smaller than the Sun and similar in mass and temperature, but is much younger, with an age of about 700 million years. It hosts a system of at least six, and possibly seven exoplanets.

== Planetary system ==
TOI-1136 was discovered to have six transiting planets in 2022 using the Transiting Exoplanet Survey Satellite (TESS), all orbiting closer to their star than Mercury is to the Sun. All of them are Neptune-sized or sub-Neptunes, and their masses have been measured using a combination of radial velocity and transit-timing variations, showing them to have low densities. The planets are in an orbital resonance, with period ratios near 3:2, 2:1, 3:2, 7:5, and 3:2.

A possible single transit of a seventh planet was also identified. This candidate planet would also be sub-Neptune-size planet, but its orbit is poorly constrained. If this is confirmed, it would make TOI-1136 one of the most populous known planetary systems.

The TOI-1136 planetary system
Companion (in order from star)	Mass	Semimajor axis (AU)	Orbital period (days)	Eccentricity	Inclination (°)	Radius
b	3.50+0.8 −0.7 M_{🜨}	0.05106±0.0009	4.1727±0.0003	0.027±0.009	86.44+0.27 −0.21	1.90+0.21 −0.15 R_{🜨}
c	6.32+1.1 −1.3 M_{🜨}	0.0669±0.0005	6.2574±0.0002	0.11±0.01	89.42+0.39 −0.55	2.879+0.060 −0.062 R_{🜨}
d	8.35+1.8 −1.6 M_{🜨}	0.1062±0.0008	12.5199±0.0004	0.042±0.004	89.41±0.28	4.627+0.077 −0.072 R_{🜨}
e	6.07+1.09 −1.01 M_{🜨}	0.139±0.002	18.801±0.001	0.0425±0.004	89.31+0.26 −0.18	2.639+0.072 −0.088 R_{🜨}
f	9.7+3.9 −3.7 M_{🜨}	0.174±0.002	26.321±0.001	0.001±0.001	89.38+0.22 −0.17	3.88±0.11 R_{🜨}
g	5.6+4.1 −3.2 M_{🜨}	0.229±0.003	39.545±0.002	0.04±0.01	89.65+0.18 −0.13	2.53+0.11 −0.12 R_{🜨}
h (unconfirmed)	<18.8 M_{🜨}	~0.36	~77	0.04+0.05 −0.03	89.68±0.02°	2.68+0.20 −0.18 R_{🜨}

== See also ==
- HD 110067
- Kepler-90
- Kepler-385
- TOI-178
- TRAPPIST-1
