= Subdwarf B star =

Subdwarf star with spectral type B

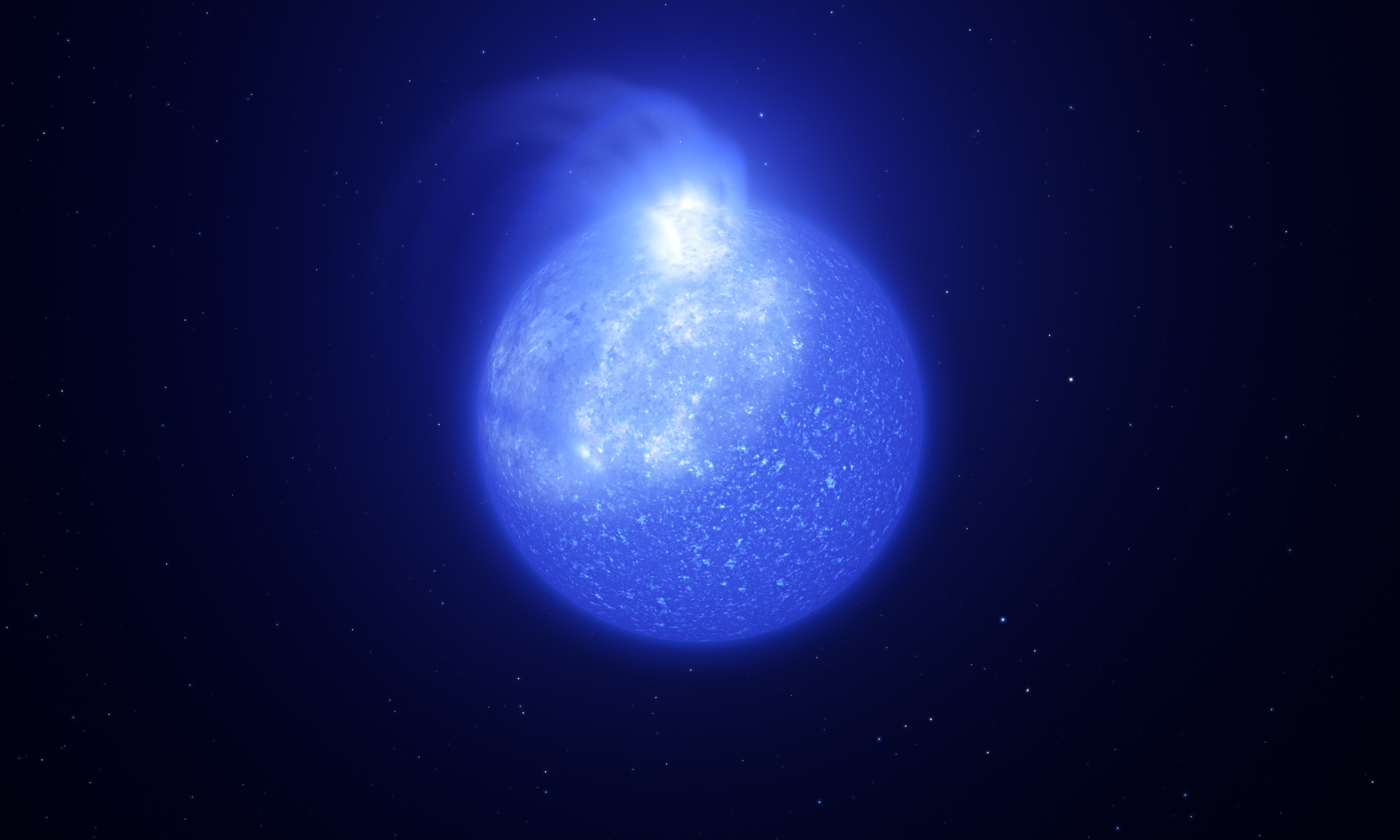
Artist's impression of a sdB star, showing a giant hot spot

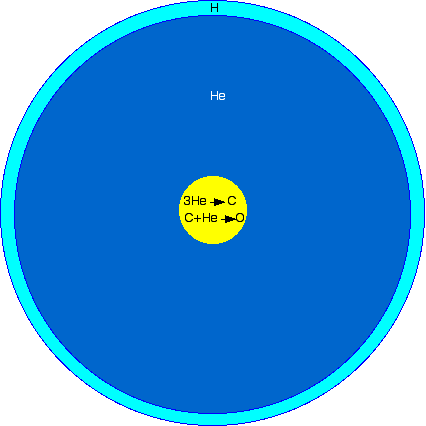
Schematic cross-section of a B-type subdwarf

A B-type subdwarf (sdB) is a kind of subdwarf star with spectral type B. They differ from the typical subdwarf by being much hotter and brighter. They are situated at the "extreme horizontal branch" of the Hertzsprung–Russell diagram. Masses of these stars are around 0.5 solar masses, and they contain only about 1% hydrogen, with the rest being helium. Their radius is from 0.15 to 0.25 solar radii, and their surface temperature is from 20,000 to 40,000 K (19,700 to 39,700 °C; 35,500 to 71,500 °F).

== Formation and evolution ==
These stars represent a late stage in the evolution of some stars, caused when a red giant star loses its outer hydrogen layers before the core begins to fuse helium. The reasons why this premature mass loss occurs are unclear, but the interaction of stars in a binary star system is thought to be one of the main mechanisms. Single subdwarfs may be the result of a merger of two white dwarfs or be formed through engulfment of brown dwarfs by red giant stars.. The sdB stars are expected to become white dwarfs without going through any more giant stages.

Subdwarf B stars, being more luminous than white dwarfs, are a significant component in the hot star population of old stellar systems, such as globular clusters, spiral galaxy bulges and elliptical galaxies. They are prominent on ultraviolet images. The hot subdwarfs are proposed to be the cause of the UV upturn in the light output of elliptical galaxies.

A single B type subdwarf at 1 M_{☉} is calculated to last for about 100 million years.

== History ==
Subdwarf B stars were discovered by Fritz Zwicky and Humason around 1947, when they found subluminous blue stars around the north galactic pole. In the Palomar-Green survey, they were discovered to be the most common kind of faint blue star with a magnitude over 18. During the 1960s, spectroscopy discovered that many of the sdB stars are deficient in hydrogen, with abundances below that predicted by the Big Bang theory. In the early 1970s Greenstein and Sargent measured temperatures and gravity strengths and were able to plot their correct position on the Hertzsprung–Russell diagram.

== Variables ==
There are three kinds of variable stars in this category:

The first are the sdBV with periods from 90 to 600 seconds. They are also called EC14026 or V361 Hya stars. A proposed new nomenclature is sdBV_{r}, with r standing for rapid. One theory for the oscillations of these stars is that the variations in brightness are due to acoustic mode oscillations with low degree (l) and low order (n). They are driven by ionisation of iron group atoms causing opacity. The velocity curve is 90 degrees out of phase with the brightness curve, while the effective temperature and surface gravity acceleration curves appear to be in phase with the flux variations. In plots of temperature against surface gravity, the short-period pulsators cluster together in the so-called empirical instability strip, approximately defined by T=28,000–35,000 K (27,700–34,700 °C; 49,900–62,500 °F) and log g=5.2–6.0. Only 10% of sdBs falling in the empirical strip are observed to pulsate.

The second are the long period variables with periods from 45 to 180 minutes. A proposed new nomenclature is sdBV_{s}, with 's' standing for slow. These only have a very small variation of 0.1%. They have also been called PG1716 or V1093 Her or abbreviated as LPsdBV. The long-period pulsating sdB stars are generally cooler than their rapid counterparts, with T~23,000–30,000 K (22,700–29,700 °C; 40,900–53,500 °F).

Stars that oscillate in both period regimes are 'hybrids', with a standard nomenclature of sdBV_{rs}. An example is DW Lyncis, also identified as HS 0702+6043.

| Variable star | Other name | Constellation | Distance (ly) |
|---|---|---|---|
| V361 Hydrae | EC 14026-2647 | Hydra | 2,630 |
| V1093 Herculis | GSC 03081-00631 | Hercules | 2,861 |
| HW Virginis* | HIP 62157 | Virgo | 590 |
| NY Virginis* | GSC 04966-00491 | Virgo | 1,800 |
| V391 Pegasi | HS 2201+2610 | Pegasus | 4,570 |

*eclipsing binary star

== Planetary systems ==
There are at least four sdB stars which may possess planetary systems. However in three of four cases, subsequent research has indicated that the evidence for the planets' existence was not as strong as previously believed, and whether or not the planetary systems exist is not proven either way.

V391 Pegasi was the first sdB star believed to have an exoplanet in orbit around it, although subsequent research has significantly weakened the evidentiary case for the planet's existence.

Kepler-70 may have a system of two or more close-orbiting planets, although later research suggests that this is unlikely to be the case. If Kepler-70's two close-orbiting planets do exist, they may be the remnants of the cores of close-orbiting gas giants. These would have been engulfed by the red giant progenitor, and the rocky/metallic cores would be the only parts of the planets to survive without being evaporated. Alternatively, they may be sections of core from one larger gas giant, engulfed as described, with the core having fragmented inside the star.

Kepler-429 may possess a system of three roughly Earth-sized planets in very close orbit. If these exist, then they would be similar to the hypothetical Kepler-70 exoplanets. However, the same new techniques that cast doubt on the Kepler-70 exoplanets were applied in this case too and indicated that the three signals which had been detected could in fact merely be misleading artifacts in the data that earlier analysis techniques had not handled well.

Kepler-451 is the close binary system of a subdwarf B and a red dwarf star, which is orbited by the circumbinary planets Kepler-451b, Kepler-451c and Kepler-451d.
