= Kepler-451 =

Binary star system in the constellation Cygnus

Observation data Epoch J2000 Equinox ICRS
- Constellation: Cygnus
- Right ascension: 19^{h} 38^{m} 32.612^{s}
- Declination: +46^{h} 03^{m} 59.14^{s}
- Apparent magnitude (V): 12.69

Characteristics
- Spectral type: sdBV+dM

Astrometry
Proper motion (μ)	RA: 5.225(37) mas/yr Dec.: −4.405(42) mas/yr
Parallax (π)	2.4410±0.0316 mas
Distance	1,340 ± 20 ly (410 ± 5 pc)

Orbit
Period (P)	0.125765282(5) d
Semi-major axis (a)	0.823±0.015 R_{☉}
Eccentricity (e)	0.0004
Inclination (i)	69.45±0.20°
Semi-amplitude (K_{1}) (primary)	65.7±0.6 km/s

Details

Kepler-451 A
Mass	0.48±0.03 M_{☉}
Radius	0.203±0.001 R_{☉}
Temperature	29564±106 K

Kepler-451 B
Mass	0.12±0.01 M_{☉}
Radius	0.168±0.001 R_{☉}

Other designations
- Kepler-451, KIC 9472174, TYC 3556-3568-1, 2MASS J19383260+4603591

Database references
SIMBAD	data
Exoplanet Archive	data

Kepler-451 (also known as 2MASS J19383260+4603591 and abbreviated to 2M1938+4603) is an eclipsing post-common envelope binary star system that comprises two stars, a pulsating subdwarf B star and a small red dwarf star. It is located about 1,340 light-years (410 parsecs) away in the constellation Cygnus. It has been hypothesized to host one or more exoplanets.

== Planetary system ==
Periodic variations in the timing of this system's eclipses were detected in 2015 using data from the Kepler space telescope. It was proposed that these variations are caused by the gravitational effects of a Jupiter-mass planet, Kepler-451b, orbiting with a period of 416 days at a distance of 0.92 AU.

The existence of planets in this system is disputed. An independent study in 2020 found no evidence for Kepler-451b, ruling out the presence of any object of at least Jupiter's mass on the claimed orbit with an inclination greater than 43°. A 2022 study instead proposed a three-planet model, including the originally claimed planet as well as two other planets of similar mass with orbital periods of 43 and 1,800 days.

In general, eclipse timing variations of this type are common in post-common envelope binary systems, and their true cause remains uncertain.

A 2026 study revised the possibility of planetary companions using 20 years of eclipse timing data. One of the models (DS-A) suggested two companions orbiting at 3.4 and 4.3 au, while the other (DS-B) suggested three companions orbiting at 0.91, 3.4 and 4.3 au. They note that the inner companion in the DS-B model could be an artifact of systematic issues, while the outer companion in both models could be explained as being the result of magnetic activity. Therefore, the data supports the presence of only one planet at 3.4 au.

The Kepler-451 planetary system
Companion (in order from star)	Mass	Semimajor axis (AU)	Orbital period (years)	Eccentricity	Inclination (°)	Radius
b (unconfirmed)	≥3.75+0.83 −0.84 M_{J}	3.4±0.2	8.24+0.21 −0.22	0.40+0.02 −0.03	—	—
