= HD 83443 =

Star in the constellation Vela

HD 83443 / Kalausi
Observation data Epoch J2000.0 (ICRS) Equinox ICRS
- Constellation: Vela
- Right ascension: 09^{h} 37^{m} 11.8275^{s}
- Declination: −43° 16′ 19.934″
- Apparent magnitude (V): 8.23

Characteristics
- Evolutionary stage: main sequence
- Spectral type: K0 V
- U−B color index: +0.50
- B−V color index: +0.811
- Variable type: Constant

Astrometry
Radial velocity (R_{v})	+29.21±0.08 km/s
Proper motion (μ)	RA: 21.805(16) mas/yr Dec.: −120.094(18) mas/yr
Parallax (π)	24.4794±0.0159 mas
Distance	133.24 ± 0.09 ly (40.85 ± 0.03 pc)
Absolute magnitude (M_{V})	5.04

Details
Mass	0.79±0.07 M_{☉} 0.98±0.07 M_{☉} 1.004±0.031 M_{☉}
Radius	0.94±0.02 R_{☉}
Luminosity	0.88 L_{☉}
Surface gravity (log g)	4.43±0.08 cgs
Temperature	5,511±45 K
Metallicity [Fe/H]	0.34±0.03 dex
Rotation	35.3 d
Rotational velocity (v sin i)	1.4 km/s
Age	3.2 Gyr; 2.638±2.489 Gyr

Other designations
- Kalausi, CD−42°5452, GC 13300, HD 83443, HIP 47202, SAO 221348, 2MASS J09371182-4316198

Database references
SIMBAD	data

HD 83443 is an orange dwarf star approximately 133 light-years away in the constellation of Vela. As of 2000, at least one extrasolar planet has been confirmed to be orbiting the star. The star HD 83443 is named Kalausi. The name was selected in the NameExoWorlds campaign by Kenya, during the 100th anniversary of the IAU. The word Kalausi means a very strong whirling column of wind in the Dholuo language.

== Planetary system ==
The planet HD 83443 b was discovered in 2000 by the Geneva Extrasolar Planet Search Team led by Michel Mayor. It has a minimum mass comparable to Saturn's, and its orbit at the time of discovery was one of the shortest known taking only three days to complete one revolution around the star. This hot Jupiter is likely to be slightly larger than Jupiter in radius.

In 2000, the same year that planet b was found, another planet around HD 83443 was announced by the Geneva Team. The new planet was designated as "HD 83443 c". It had a mass smaller than planet b and a short, very eccentric orbit. Its orbital period, 28.9 days, was especially interesting, because it indicated a 10:1 orbital resonance between the planets. However, a team led by astronomer Paul Butler did not detect any signal indicating the existence of the second planet. New observations by the Geneva team could not detect the signal either and the discovery claim had to be retracted. The origin of the signal, which was "highly significant" in the earlier data, is not yet clear. Another planet, designated HD 83443 c, was discovered in 2022 in a wide, eccentric 22-year orbit. It is suspected that HD 83443 c entered its current orbit due to the inward migration of HD 83443 b.

The HD 83443 planetary system
Companion (in order from star)	Mass	Semimajor axis (AU)	Orbital period (days)	Eccentricity	Inclination (°)	Radius
b (Buru)	>0.38 M_{J}	0.039	2.98565±0.00003	0.013±0.013	—	—
c	1.5^{+0.5}_{−0.2} M_{J}	8.0±0.8	8241^{+1019}_{−530}	0.76±0.05	—	—
