= Kepler-70 =

Star in the constellation Cygnus

Observation data Epoch J2000 Equinox ICRS
- Constellation: Cygnus
- Right ascension: 19^{h} 45^{m} 25.47457^{s}
- Declination: +41° 05′ 33.8822″
- Apparent magnitude (V): 14.87

Characteristics
- Evolutionary stage: horizontal branch
- Spectral type: sdB
- Apparent magnitude (U): 13.80
- Apparent magnitude (B): 14.71
- Apparent magnitude (R): 15.43
- Apparent magnitude (I): 15.72
- Apparent magnitude (J): 15.36
- Apparent magnitude (H): 15.59

Astrometry
Proper motion (μ)	RA: +7.217(29) mas/yr Dec.: −3.148(30) mas/yr
Parallax (π)	0.9086±0.0247 mas
Distance	3,590 ± 100 ly (1,100 ± 30 pc)
Absolute magnitude (M_{V})	+4.21±0.11

Details
Mass	0.496±0.002 M_{☉}
Radius	0.203±0.007 R_{☉}
Luminosity	22.9±3.1 L_{☉}
Surface gravity (log g)	5.552±0.041 cgs or 5.52±0.03 cgs
Temperature	27,730±270 K or 28,050±470 K
Age	18.4±1.0 (Note: Since reaching the horizontal branch.) Myr

Other designations
- 2MASS J19452546+4105339, KIC 5807616, KOI-55, UCAC2 46165657, UCAC3 263-170867, USNO-B1.0 1310-00349976

Database references
SIMBAD	data
KIC	data

Kepler-70, also known as KIC 5807616 and KOI-55, is a star about 3,600 light-years (1,100 parsecs) away in the constellation Cygnus, with an apparent visual magnitude of 14.87. This is too faint to be seen with the naked eye; viewing it requires a telescope with an aperture of 40 cm (20 in) or more.

A subdwarf B star, Kepler-70 passed through the red giant stage some 18.4 million years ago. In its present-day state, it is fusing helium in its core. Once it runs out of helium it will contract to form a white dwarf. It has a relatively small radius of about 0.2 times the Sun's radius; white dwarfs are generally much smaller. The star was thought to be host to a planetary system with two planets, although later research indicates that this is not in fact the case.

== Properties ==
Kepler-70 is an sdB (B-type subdwarf) star with a temperature of about 28,000 K, equivalent to that of a B0-type star, and nearly 6 times as hot as the surface temperature of the Sun, which has a surface temperature of 5,772 K. It has a luminosity of 22.9 L_{☉}, a radius of 0.203 R_{☉}, and a mass of 0.496 M_{☉}. The star left the red-giant stage of its lifetime about 18.4 million years ago.

Kepler-70 is still fusing helium in its core. When it runs out of helium, it will contract into a white dwarf.

== Search for planets ==
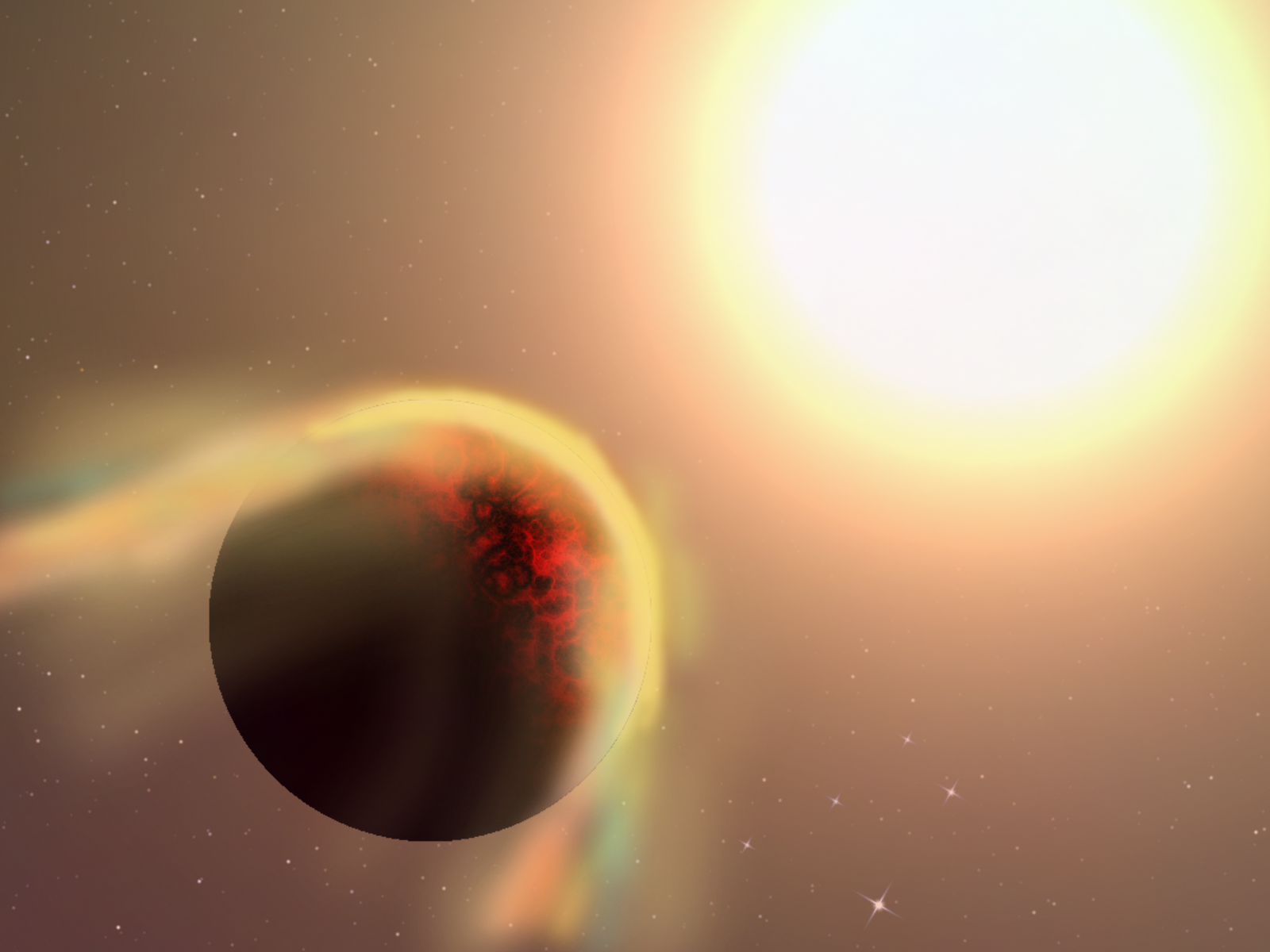
Artist's impression of Kepler-70b

On December 21, 2011, evidence for two extremely short-period planets, Kepler-70b and Kepler-70c (also known as KOI-55 b and KOI-55 c), was announced by Charpinet et al. based on observations from the Kepler space telescope. They were detected by the reflection of starlight caused by the planets themselves, rather than through a variation in apparent stellar magnitude caused by them transiting the star. The measurements also suggested a smaller body between the two candidate planets.

According to the main author of the paper in Nature that announced the discovery of the two planets, Stephane Charpinet, the two planets "probably plunged deep into the star's envelope during the red giant phase, but survived." However, this is not the first sighting of planets orbiting a post-red-giant star – a handful of pulsar planets have been observed, including PSR J1719−1438 b which orbits closer to its host star, and consequently in a shorter time than, any other planet.

Two planets may have started out as a pair of gas giants which spiraled inward toward their host star, which subsequently became a red giant. This engulfed the planets, evaporating all but their solid cores, which now orbit the sdB star. Alternatively, there may only have been one gas giant engulfed in this way, with the rocky/metallic core having survived evaporation but fragmented inside the star. If this theory is correct, the two planets would be two large sections of the gas giant's core.

If these planets existed, then the orbits of Kepler-70b and Kepler-70c would've had a 7:10 orbital resonance and the closest approach between planets of any known planetary system. However, later research suggested that what had been detected was not in fact the reflection of light from exoplanets, but stellar pulsation "visible beyond the cut-off frequency of the star." Further research indicated that star pulsation modes were indeed the more likely explanation for the signals found in 2011, and that the two exoplanets probably do not exist.

If Kepler-70b existed, then it would've had a temperature of about 7288 K, the same as that of an F0 star. The hottest confirmed exoplanet and the hottest with a measured temperature is KELT-9b, with a temperature of about 4,600 K.
