= V361 Hydrae =

Star in the constellation Hydra

Observation data Epoch J2000.0 Equinox ICRS
- Constellation: Hydra
- Right ascension: 14^{h} 05^{m} 33.018^{s}
- Declination: −27° 01′ 34.01″
- Apparent magnitude (V): 15.3

Characteristics
- Evolutionary stage: horizontal branch
- Spectral type: sdB+
- Variable type: V361 Hya

Astrometry
Proper motion (μ)	RA: −7.8 mas/yr Dec.: −9.4 mas/yr
Parallax (π)	−0.7258±0.3350 mas
Distance	~7,200 ly (2,231 pc)

Details
Mass	0.47 M_{☉}
Radius	0.101 R_{☉}
Luminosity	13.3 L_{☉}
Surface gravity (log g)	6.10 cgs
Temperature	34,700 K

Other designations
- EC 14026−2647, UCAC4 315-074628

Database references
SIMBAD	data

V361 Hydrae is a hot subdwarf variable star, the prototype of a class of pulsating variables. It is very approximately 2,200 parsecs away in the constellation of Hydra. The star is classified as an extreme horizontal branch star; it is small, with only half the mass and a tenth the diameter of the Sun, but is 13 times as luminous as the Sun.

== Discovery ==
This star was first noted in the Edinburgh-Cape Blue Object Survey, a search for blue objects in the southern celestial hemisphere published in 1997, and it was catalogued as EC 14026−2647. Together with several similar objects from the survey, it was found to pulsate with a period of just a few minutes. These stars were initially referred to as EC 14026 stars and tentatively grouped with the PV Telescopii variables. In 2000, this star was given the variable star designation V361 Hydrae and in 2008 a new class of variable stars was formally created, the V361 Hydrae variables.

V361 Hydrae itself varies in brightness by about a tenth of a magnitude with a period of 144 seconds.

== Formation ==
Subdwarf B stars such as V361 Hydrae are thought to be the result of the ejection of the hydrogen envelope of a red giant star at or just before the onset of helium fusion. The ejection left only a tiny amount of hydrogen on the surface—less than 1/1000 of the total stellar mass. The future for the star is to eventually cool down to make a low-mass white dwarf. Most stars retain more of their hydrogen after the first red giant phase, and eventually become asymptotic giant branch stars. The reason that some stars lose so much mass is not well known. At the tip of the red-giant branch, the red giant precursors of the subdwarf stars reach their maximum radius, on the order of 0.7 AU. After this point, the hydrogen envelope is lost and helium fusion begins—this is known as the helium flash.

== Possible companion ==
The spectrum of V361 Hydrae is unusual and difficult to interpret. While it is clearly a hot hydrogen-deficient subdwarf, the spectrum contains a full series of hydrogen absorption lines that are typical of a class F or G main sequence star and these are presumed to originate from an otherwise-unseen companion.

== Sources ==
- C. S. Jeffery (2005). "Pulsations in Subdwarf B Stars". Journal of Astrophysics and Astronomy. 26 (2–3): 261–271. Bibcode:2005JApA...26..261J. doi:10.1007/BF02702334. S2CID 13814916.
