= WISE J0830+2837 =

Possible free-floating planet

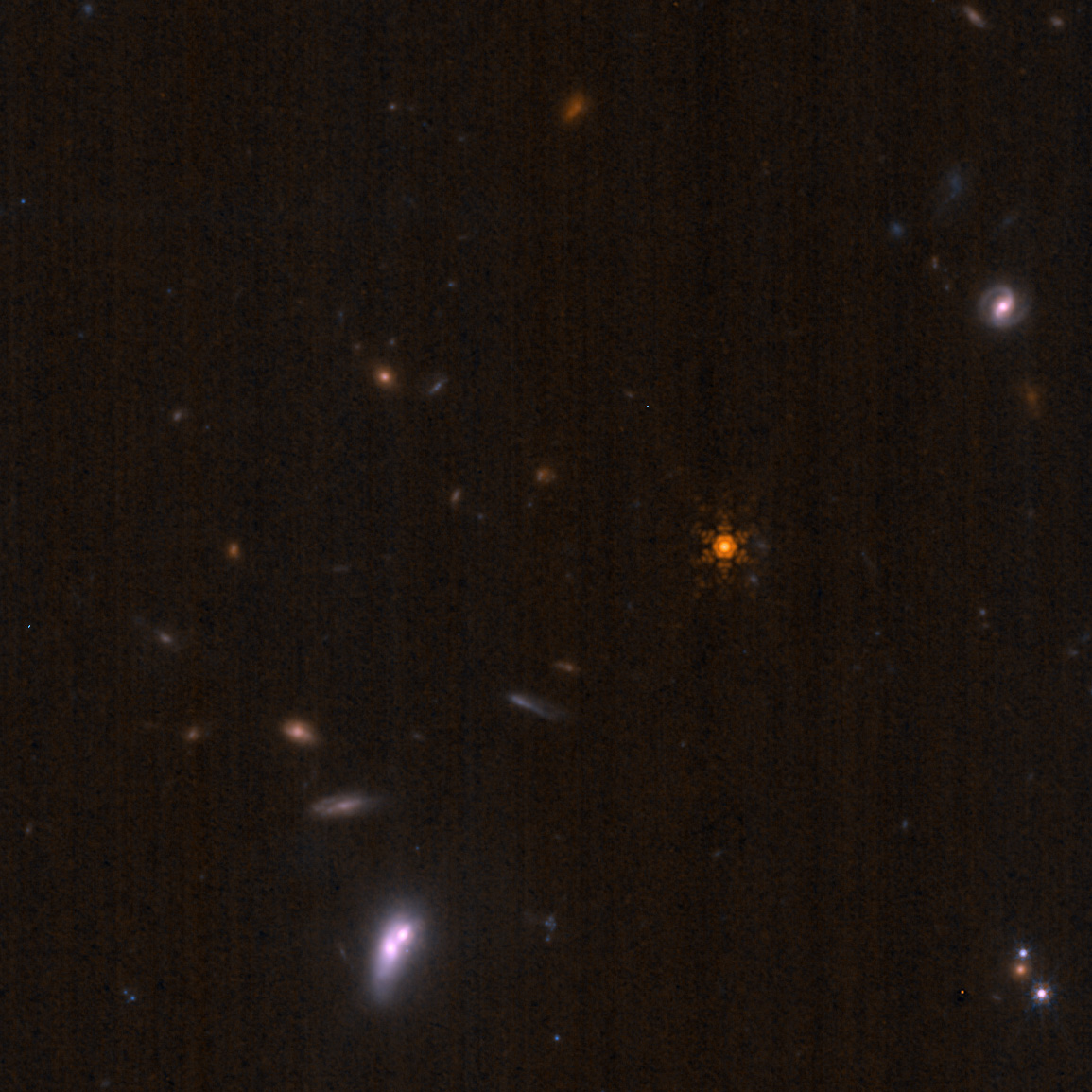
- JWST image of WISEA J0830+2837 (orange "star" middle-right)

Observation data Epoch J2000 Equinox J2000
- Constellation: Cancer
- Right ascension: 08^{h} 30^{m} 12.20039^{s}
- Declination: +28° 37′ 37.7720″

Characteristics
- Evolutionary stage: free-floating planetary-mass object
- Spectral type: ≥Y1

Astrometry
Total velocity	≥107.9 ±16.67 km/s
Proper motion (μ)	RA: –190.2 ± 8.4 mas/yr Dec.: –2011.0 ± 6.9 mas/yr
Parallax (π)	99.2±6.5 mas
Distance	33 ± 2 ly (10.1 ± 0.7 pc)

Details
Mass	4–13 M_{Jup}
Temperature	≈350 K

Other designations
- CWISEP J083011.94+283706.1, CWISEP J083011.94+283716.2, WISEA J083011.95+283716.0, WISE J083011.97+283716.6

Database references
SIMBAD	data

WISE J0830+2837 (WISEA J083011.95+283716.0) is a candidate Y dwarf and one of the reddest Y dwarfs ever discovered. It was first identified as an object with high proper motion in WISE images by the volunteers Dan Caselden and Guillaume Colin of the Backyard Worlds citizen science project. The astronomers, led by scientist Daniella Bardalez Gagliuffi, then carried out follow-up observations with Spitzer and Hubble. The object has a distance of around 10 parsecs (33 ly) from the Solar System, calculated from a combined Spitzer+JWST parallax measurement.

The researchers did detect WISE J0830+2837 with Spitzer, but not with Hubble. This implies a very red color for this object. The object might have a color in between the coldest Y-dwarf WISE 0855−0714 and other Y-dwarfs. It was therefore seen as a missing link between these two populations. But since then other cold objects in this gap were found, most notably Epsilon Indi Ab and WISE J0336−0143 B. WISE J0830+2837 is however easier to observe as it is floating alone.

WISE J0830+2837 also shows a large tangential velocity of 107.9 ±16.67 km/s, which implies an old age. Assuming an age between 1 and 10 Gyrs, the team found a mass of 4–13 M_{J}, making the object a planetary-mass object. JWST photometry confirmed the red color by measuring the brightness with the NIRCam filters F150W and F480M, with a "color" of F150W – F480M = 9.62 mag. This work also improved the parallax, showing that it is 10% closer than previously thought. It might be a typical field dwarf, meaning it would have a metallicity similar to the sun. But it could also be superluminous, possibly supporting an old age and low metallicity and/or high gravity. A future work will present the detection of this object in the near-infrared. One JWST proposal includes it in its proposed spectroscopic observations with both NIRSpec and MIRI.

== See also ==
- List of Y-dwarfs
- CWISE J1055+5443 another Y-dwarf discovered by volunteers of the Backyard Worlds project
