= List of Y-dwarfs =

This is a list of astronomical objects with the spectral type Y. They are a mix of brown dwarfs and planetary-mass objects. They are the coldest such objects in interstellar space and have a temperature around below 500 Kelvin (227°C; 440°F). Only a few are known due to their faint nature. The list is sorted after distance.

== Table ==
List of Y-dwarfs
Name	spectral type	T_{eff} (Kelvin)	Mass estimate (M_{J})	distance (light years)	Year of discovery
Jupiter	Y-class analog	125	1	solar system	known since ancient times
WISE J0855−0714	Y4 (extrapolated)	276±9	3−10	7.43±0.04	2014
Epsilon Indi Ab	Y3 (Note: Estimated using the effective temperature. By using Eric Mamajek's table one can compare T_{eff} with the spectral type. Alternatively one can fit a curve to T5-Y4 dwarfs, which gives the formula $T_{eff}=1.35\times10^7\times SpType^{-3.441}$, with SpType 19 is T9, 20 is Y0, 21 is Y1, etc. Might be inaccurate for objects with non-solar metallicity.) (estimated)	275	6.31^{+0.60}_{−0.56}	11.867±0.004	2018 (discovered) 2024 (imaging)
WISE J1639−6847	Y0pec	398±20	5−14 or 9−17	15.45±0.04	2012
WISE J0350−5658	Y1	355^{+13}_{−11}	3−8 or 7−13	18.49±0.24	2012
WISEPA J1541−2250	Y1	411^{+18}_{−17}	8−20	18.9±0.2	2011
WISE J2209+2711	Y0	355^{+13}_{−11}	8−19 or 5	20.17±0.25	2014
WISEPC J1405+5534	Y0.5 (pec?)	392^{+16}_{−15}	9−21	20.6±0.3	2011
WISEPA J0410+1502	Y0	451±88	8−20	21.32±0.10	2011
WISE J0825+2805	Y0.5	387±15	3−8 or 5	21.4±0.4	2015
CWISE J1055+5443	Y0 (pec)	500±150	4−6	22^{+3}_{−2}	2023
WISEPC J2056+1459	Y0	481^{+26}_{−20}	13−23 or 5	22.27±0.07	2011
SMDET-1	Y (estimate)	<391		<24.1	2026
WISEPA J1738+2732	Y0	431±27	5−14, 3−9 or 11−21	24.4±0.2	2011
WISEA J2354+0240	Y1	347^{+13}_{−11}	8−14 or 2.5^{+2.0}_{−1.3}	25.0±0.6	2015
WISENF J1936+0408	Y0 (estimated)	460±79		28.6^{+1.0}_{−0.9}	2020
WISE J0647−6232	Y1	394±20	5–13 or 4.6^{+3.0}_{−2.2}	29.6±0.6	2013
WISE J0713−2917	Y0	464±88	13−29	29.6±0.2	2012
WISEPC J1217+1626 B	Y0	460±79	8−20	30.4±1.0	2012
WISEA J1930−2059	≥Y1 (estimated)	372±20		30.7^{+1.5}_{−1.4}	2020
CWISEP J0402−2651	≥Y1 (estimated)	367±79		31.2^{+5.4}_{−4.0}	2020
WISEA J1141−3326	Y0	460±79	3–8	31.4±0.9	2014
CWISEP J1446−2317	Y1	351^{+16}_{−13}	8.0 or 14.6	31.4^{+1.6}_{−1.4}	2020
CWISEP J2256+4002	≥Y1 (estimated)	367±79		32.0^{+4.0}_{−3.2}	2020
WISEPA J1828+2650	≥Y2	462±25 or 480 + 340 binary	3–8	32.5^{+0.7}_{−0.6}	2011
WISE J0336−0143 A	Y0:	460±79	8.5–18	32.7±0.7	2012
WISE J0336−0143 B	Y2.5 (estimated)	285–305	5–11.5	32.7±0.7	2023
WISEA J0830+2837	≥Y1 (estimated)	345±20	4−13	32.9^{+2.3}_{−2.0}	2020
WISEU J0503−5648	≥Y1 (estimated)	364±20		33.2^{+1.4}_{−1.3}	2020
WISE J2220−3628	Y0	452±88	8–20	34.9±0.4	2012
CWISE J0925−4720	Y0 (estimated)	460±79		~35.0	2021
CWISER J0216+4230	Y0 (estimated)	460±79		~35.2	2023
WISEA J2243−1458	Y0 (estimated)	460±79		37.4^{+3.0}_{−2.6}	2020
WISE J1206+8401	Y0	472^{+26}_{−30}	6−14 or 12−22	38.5^{+1.0}_{−0.9}	2015
CWISEP J0238−1332	≥Y1 (estimated)	367±79		38.6^{+3.8}_{−3.1}	2020
CWISE J2351−7000	Y0 (estimated)	393±20		29±3	2020
WISE J0359−5401	Y0	443^{+23}_{−19}	12−22 or 13	44.3±1.2	2012
WISE J0734−7157	Y0	466^{+28}_{−23}	9−20	44.5±0.4	2012
WISE J0304−2705	Y0 pec	465±88		44.6^{+1.6}_{−1.5}	2014
CWISEP J2011−4812	Y0 (estimated)	460±79	3.8^{+2.6}_{−1.8}	46±2	2020
CWISE J1811+6658	early-Y (estimated)	412±79		47^{+5}_{−4}	2023
CWISEP J1935−1546A	≥Y1 (estimated)	367±79	12–39	47^{+3}_{−2}	2019
CWISEP J1935−1546B	>Y1 (estimated)	360–420	7–24	47^{+3}_{−2}	2025
WISE J0535−7500	Y1	496^{+28}_{−23} or 480 + 340 binary	8−20 or 12+18	47.5^{+1.4}_{−1.3}	2012
CWISEP J0940+5233	≥Y1 (estimated)	413±20	2.8^{+3.0}_{−1.6}	47.7^{+6.3}_{−5.0}	2020
CWISEP J1047+5457	Y1	395^{+23}_{−21}	20.6 or 15.9 or 1–3	47.9^{+3.7}_{−3.2}	2020
CWISEP J0321+6932	Y0.5 (estimated)	412±79		48±3	2020
WISEA J1257+7153	≥Y1 (estimated)	382±20	4.7^{+3.0}_{−2.2}	48.2^{+14.3}_{−9.0}	2020
CWISEP J0938+0634	Y0 (estimated)	460±79		49.9^{+6.2}_{−5.0}	2020
CWISEP J2230+2549	≥Y1 (estimated)	389±20		52.4^{+4.8}_{−4.0}	2020
CWISEP J2356−4814	Y0.5 (estimated)	412±79	3.1^{+2.3}_{−1.6}	52.6^{+7.6}_{−5.9}	2020
CWISEP J0634+5049	Y0 (estimated)	460±79		53^{+4}_{−3}	2020
WISEA J1534−1043	esdY0–esdY2 (estimated)	447±45		53 ±4	2020
WISEA J0302−5817	Y0:	460±79		55±3	2018
CWISE J1531−3306	Y0 (estimated)	460±79		~55.4	2021
CWISEP J0859+5349	Y0 (estimated)	460±79		56.3^{+5.0}_{−4.0}	2020
Ross 19 B	sdY (estimated)	460 ±79	15−40	56.89±0.04	2021
WISE 0226-0211 B	T9.5 to Y0 (estimated)	511 ±79		57.9^{+2.7}_{−2.4}	2019
14 Herculis c	Y3 (estimated)	275	7.9^{+1.6}_{−1.2}	58.38±0.03	2021 (discovered) 2025 (imaging)
CWISEP J2355+3804	Y0 (estimate, might be T-dwarf)	450^{+109}_{−102}		60^{+5.8}_{−4.9}	2020
WD 0806−661 B	Y0	377±88	7−9	62.73±0.02	2011
WISE J0146+4234 B	Y0	411±20	8−20	63±2	2015
CWISE J2227+2604	Y0 (estimated)	460±79		~65.2	2023
CFBDSIR 1458+10 B	Y0 (estimated)	370±40	6–15	75.34±7.83	2011
CWISEP J1359-4352	Y0 (estimated)	472^{+90}_{−89}		79.4^{+9.3}_{−7.5}	2020
CWISEP J0156+3255	sdY (estimated)			125^{+19}_{−17}	2020/2024
JADES-GS-BD-5	>Y1	305+18 −16	8.5+3.2 −2.7	209+20 −16	2024, shows proper motion
JADES-GN-BD-8	sdY (estimated)	400–502		1076-2348	2025
PANO-GS-BD-18	sdY (estimated)	487–511		1174–1500	2025
Bullet-BD1	Y (estimated)	350^{+110}_{−80}	7-12	1402±228	2026 shows proper motion
JADES-GS-BD-8	sdY (estimated)	404–508		1500–3066	2024
COSMOS-Web BD11	sdY0 (estimated)	750		2020	2025
Capotauro	≥Y1 (estimated)	342^{+67}_{−46}		2020–2740	2025 shows proper motion
MoM-239450	Y0	450–500		2283–2772	2026
JADES-GS-BD-21	sdY (estimated)	340–507		2414–5871	2025
JADES-GN-BD-5	sdY (estimated)	398–507		2707–3946	2025
JADES-GN-BD-9	sdY (estimated)	441–524		2740–4827	2025
JADES-GN-BD-16	sdY (estimated)	375–526		2838–5675	2025
Bullet-BD2	Y (estimated)	410^{+110}_{−50}	12-22	2805±359	2026 shows proper motion
CEERS-EGS-BD-6	sdY (estimated)	600		3590	2024
JADES-GS-BD-4	sdY (estimated)	483–545		4175–5055	2024
CEERS-EGS-BD-7	sdY (estimated)	650		4240	2024
COSMOS-Web BD16	sdY0 (estimated)	975		4650	2025
JADES-GN-BD-11	sdY (estimated)	463–562		6817–10111	2025

JADES-GN-BD-1 and JADES-GN-BD-3 were included as Y-dwarf candidates, but were later found to be consistent with T-dwarfs. Multiple candidate companions found via infrared excess around white dwarfs and one companion (MEAD 62B) were found. Infrared excess candidates can however also be debris disks and a companion can be a background galaxy. Spectroscopy and common proper motion are needed for a confident detection. These are therefore not included, see List of exoplanets around white dwarfs for a list of candidates.

A large number of about 50 new candidate Y-dwarf were discovered with SPHEREx. These are only candidates and need confirmation.
