= WISE J0304−2705 =

Brown dwarf star in the constellation Fornax

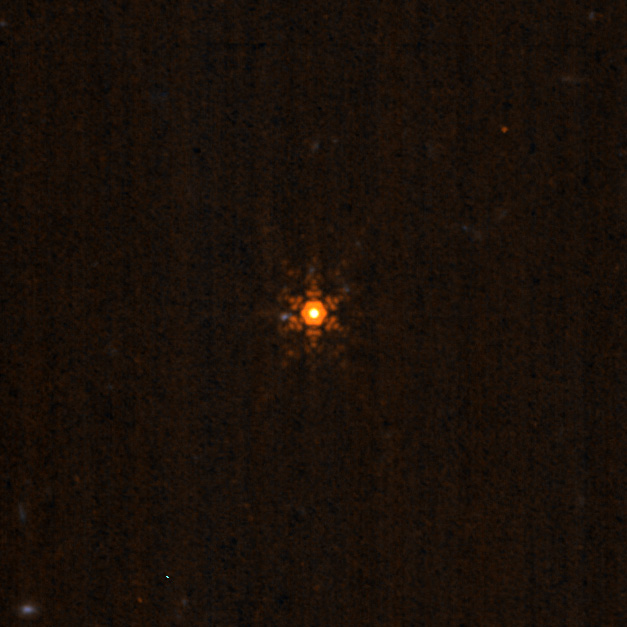
- WISE J0304−2705 with JWST NIRCam

Observation data Epoch J2000 Equinox J2000
- Constellation: Fornax
- Right ascension: 03^{h} 04^{m} 48.95^{s}
- Declination: −27° 05′ 13.35″

Characteristics
- Evolutionary stage: brown dwarf
- Spectral type: Y0pec

Astrometry
Proper motion (μ)	RA: 124.6 ±1.8 mas/yr Dec.: 494.3 ±2.6 mas/yr
Parallax (π)	73.1±2.6 mas
Distance	45 ± 2 ly (13.7 ± 0.5 pc)

Details
Mass	21−31 M_{Jup}
Surface gravity (log g)	4.0−5.0 cgs
Temperature	465 ±88 K
Age	10 Gyr

Other designations
- CNS5 770, WISEA J030449.04-270508.1, WISE J030449.03-270508.3

Database references
SIMBAD	data

WISE J0304−2705 (WISE J030449.03−270508.3) is a Y-type brown dwarf discovered in 2014.

The object was first identified from data of the Wide-field Infrared Survey Explorer in 2014. Follow-up observation with Gemini South obtained a spectrum of the object. The spectral type was found to be Y0pec, with pec standing for peculiar. The object shows a Y-band and J-band morphology indicative of sub-solar metallicity. Alternatively the J-band morphology could be explained by high gravity. This might indicate an old age of about 10 Gyr and a mass of 21−31 M_{J}. A later analysis pointed out that metallicity might not be the only cause for its unusual color.

== See also ==
- List of Y-dwarfs
