= CWISEP J1935−1546 =

Cold brown dwarf in the constellation Sagittarius

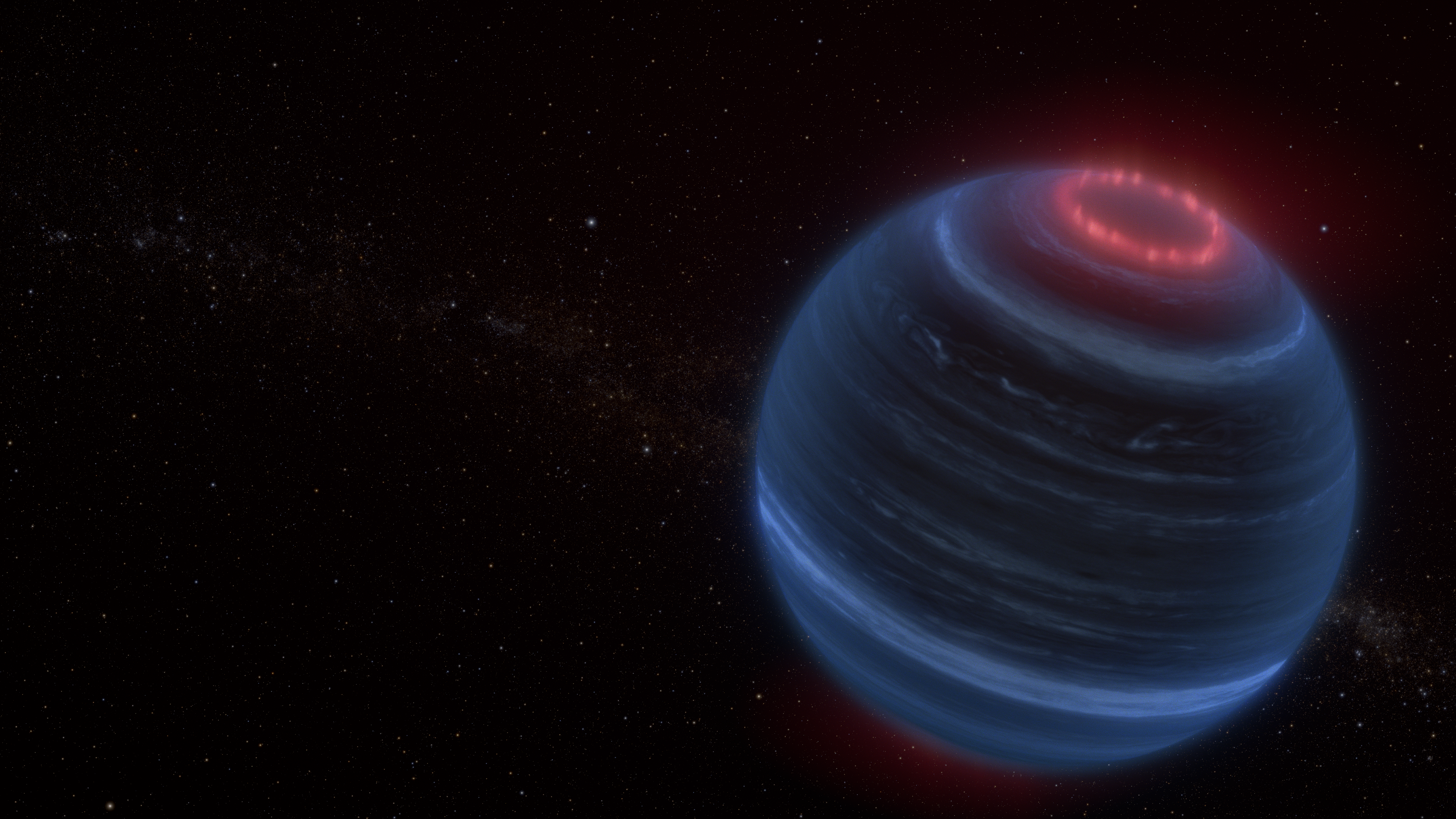
- Artist concept of the aurora in W1935

Observation data Epoch J2000 Equinox ICRS
- Constellation: Sagittarius
- Right ascension: 19^{h} 35^{m} 18.60792^{s}
- Declination: −15° 46′ 20.8074″

Characteristics
- Evolutionary stage: brown dwarf
- Spectral type: ≥Y1+ >Y1

Astrometry
| Radial velocity (R_{v}) | −36.9±5.1 km/s |
| Total velocity | 42.02±5.33 km/s |
| Proper motion (μ) | RA: 290.2±11.6 mas/yr Dec.: 43.1±11.5 mas/yr |
| Parallax (π) | 69.3±3.8 mas |
| Distance | 47 ± 3 ly (14.4 ± 0.8 pc) |

Details

W1935A
| Mass | 12–39 M_{Jup} |
| Radius | 0.95±0.14 R_{Jup} |
| Surface gravity (log g) | 4.7±0.5 cgs |
| Temperature | 482±38 K |
| Age | 4.5±4.0 Gyr |

W1935B
| Mass | 7–24 M_{Jup} |
| Temperature | 360–420 K |

Position (relative to W1935A)
| Component | W1935B |
| Epoch of observation | 20 September 2022 |
| Angular distance | 172.2+18.7 −7.7 mas |
| Position angle | 148.12+2.86 −1.98° |
| Projected separation | 2.48+0.27 −0.11 AU |

Other designations
- CWISE J193518.61−154620.7, CWISEP J193518.59−154620.3, W1935

Database references
| SIMBAD | data |

CWISEP J1935−1546 (CWISEP J193518.59−154620.3 or W1935) is a cold brown dwarf binary or planetary-mass binary with a mass of 2–20 M_{J} or 6–35 M_{J} and a distance of 14.4 parsecs (47 light-years).

CWISEP J1935−1546 was discovered in 2019 by Marocco et al. as an extremely cold brown dwarf with a temperature range of 270–360 K (−3–87 °C; 26–188 °F) and a distance of 5.6–10.9 parsecs. It was discovered with the help of the python package XGBoost, using machine-learning algorithms and the CatWISE catalog, as well as the WiseView tool. According to a NASA press release CWISEP J1935−1546 was discovered by the security engineer and citizen scientist Dan Caselden. Follow-up observations with Spitzer revealed a very red object with ch1-ch2 of 3.24±0.31 mag. Later Kirkpatrick et al. 2021 showed a temperature of 367 ± 79 K (93.9 ± 79.0 °C; 200.9 ± 142.2 °F) and a parallax of 69.3±3.8 mas (14.43+0.84
−0.75 parsec) for it. The spectral type was estimated to be later than Y1. Observations with JWST found strong signatures of methane, carbon monoxide, carbon dioxide, water vapor and ammonia in the atmosphere of this brown dwarf. The abundance of hydrogen sulfide was measured, but the researchers did not mention its detection. Phosphine was undetected and the researchers only provided upper limits.

Using JWST MIRI imaging it was discovered that CWISEP J1935−1546 is a binary of two Y-dwarfs, only the second discovered Y-dwarf binary after WISE J0336−0143. The researchers did a PSF-subtraction, revealing that it required two sources to successfully subtract the object in F1000W and F1280W filter images. The two objects are separated by 2.48+0.27
−0.11 AU, and, assuming a circular orbit, the orbital period would be 16–28 years. The mass ratio is quite low with q=0.55–0.62.

== Aurora ==
At the 243rd meeting of the AAS it was announced that W1935, shows emission of methane. This is attributed to heating of the upper atmosphere by an aurora around W1935. Impacts of electrons with molecular hydrogen creates trihydrogen cation (H^{+}_{3}) in gas giants with an aurora. Emission from H^{+}_{3} was not detected in W1935, likely due the higher density of the brown dwarf, which leads to a shorter lifetime of H^{+}_{3}. Aurorae were discovered in the past around hotter brown dwarfs with radio telescopes. The Solar System planets Jupiter and Saturn have an aurora because of interactions with the stellar wind and with particles from active moons, such as Enceladus and Io. The researchers propose that the aurora around W1935 is caused by either unaccounted internal processes or by external interactions with interstellar plasma or a nearby active moon. The researchers also announced that W1935 has a temperature inversion that is either caused by the aurora or has to do with internal energy transport. These results were later published in April 2024. The discovery of the companion W1935B allows for the alternative scenario that the companion and not the primary has the methane emission or that mechanisms in presence of the companion drive plasma formation. Observations with NIRSpec could detect periodicity of the methane emission, which could help identify which component produces the emission. Possible stable orbital configurations of an exomoon could be idenified by tracing the orbit of the Y-dwarf binary.

An analysis of this object showed that the thermal inversion requires substantially more energy deposition than predicted by aurora heating. One proposed source is Joule heating, which would require a strong magnetic field and large electron densities. The large electron densities support external ionisation from an unidentified source, such as electron precipitation. The binary companions cannot provide meaningful external ionisation to each other. An alternative source of the heating are comet impacts.

== See also ==
- List of star systems within 45–50 light-years
- List of Y-dwarfs
- SIMP0136 another brown dwarf with methane emission
