= WISE J2354+0240 =

Brown dwarf in the constellation of Pisces

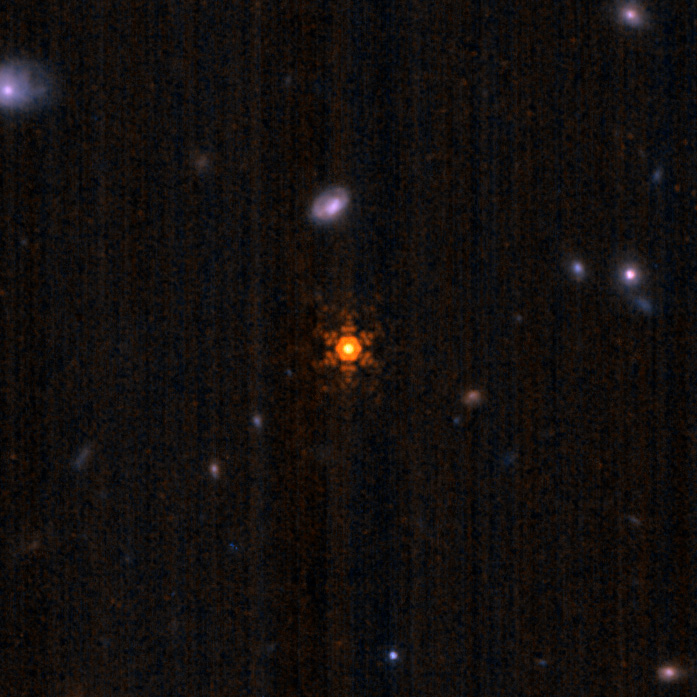
- WISE J2354+0240 with NIRCam

Observation data Epoch J2000 Equinox J2000
- Constellation: Pisces
- Right ascension: 23^{h} 54^{m} 02.42^{s}
- Declination: +02° 40′ 18.5″

Characteristics
- Evolutionary stage: brown dwarf or planetary-mass object
- Spectral type: Y1

Astrometry
Proper motion (μ)	RA: +503.5±2.3 mas/yr Dec.: −399.5±2.2 mas/yr
Parallax (π)	130.6±3.3 mas
Distance	25.0 ± 0.6 ly (7.7 ± 0.2 pc)

Details
Mass	14+1 −2 M_{Jup}
Radius	0.88+0.02 −0.01 R_{Jup}
Luminosity (bolometric)	10^{−6.800±0.023} L_{☉}
Surface gravity (log g)	4.65±0.05 cgs
Temperature	371±4 K
Metallicity	$\begin{smallmatrix}\left[\ce{M}/\ce{H}\right]\end{smallmatrix}$ = 0.23±0.02
Age	6 Gyr

Other designations
- WISEA J235402.79+024014.1, CNS5 5897, WISE J235402.77+024015.0

Database references
SIMBAD	data

WISE J2354+0240 (WISE J235402.77+024015.0, WISE 2354+0240) is a brown dwarf or free-floating planetary-mass object. It is a Y-dwarf, meaning it is one of the coldest directly imaged astronomical objects.

It was discovered in 2015, using the Wide-field Infrared Survey Explorer and spectroscopy from the Hubble Space Telescope. The authors find that the J-band peak in the spectrum is narrower than the Y0 standard and therefore assigned a spectral type of Y1, with an estimated temperature of 300−400 Kelvin. The age was estimated to be at least 1.5 billion years. Parallax measurement places this object at 7.7 parsec from the Solar System.

Near-infrared photometry was later obtained with Hubble and a temperature of 335±11 K and a mass of 11±3 M_{J} was estimated. WISE 2354+0240 was observed with the James Webb Space Telescope and the temperature was estimated to be 362+10
−12 K. The object is not described in detail in this work. The authors however mention that they see a number of absorption features in their sample, including water vapor, methane, ammonia, carbon monoxide and carbon dioxide. They note that none of their objects show absorption due to phosphine, which is predicted to occur in these objects.

An analysis of nearby stellar associations and open clusters found that WISE 2354+0240 has a 85.2% probability of belonging to the group HSC517, which does result in a mass estimate of 2.5+2.0
−1.3 M_{J}. This is one of the lowest mass estimates in their list. (Note: Currently only a pre-print. The full designation of HSC517 will be available once the paper is published.)

== See also ==
- List of Y-dwarfs
- WISE 0825+2805 another Y-dwarf discovered by Schneider et al. 2015
