= Daniella Bardalez Gagliuffi =

American Astronomer with Peruvian origin

Dr. Daniella C. Bardalez Gagliuffi is an assistant professor of astronomy at the Amherst College. Her research focuses on brown dwarfs, especially the formation, evolution and the atmosphere of these objects.

== Education and research ==
She was born in Lima, Peru, a "country with no professional astronomy". She started college at the Universidad Nacional Agraria La Molina and then transferred to Massachusetts Institute of Technology (MIT). She earned her BS in physics at MIT and her PhD at UC San Diego. She did five years of postdoctoral work at the American Museum of Natural History in New York City, before accepting an assistant position at the Amherst College. She is a former member of the UC San Diego Cool Star Lab.

Her early research involved low-mass binary stars and brown dwarfs. She was for example the lead author of the discovery of WISE J135501.90-825838.9, which later turned out to be a likely binary of planetary-mass objects with a masses of 11 and 9 M_{J}. In 2020 she was the lead author of the paper announcing the discovery of WISEA J083011.95+283716.0, which was discovered by volunteers of the Backyard Worlds: Planet 9 project. She also led a paper researching the planets around 14 Herculis. This paper disentangled the mass and inclination of both planets, finding a misalignment in their inclination.

Bardalez Gagliuffi is also interested in improving the science education in her home country Peru. She is one of the co-founder of the CosmoAmautas program, which is an educational program aimed to increase math and science literacy in Peru, as well as increasing interest in astronomy in the country.
