= WISEA J1141−3326 =

Sub-brown dwarf star in the constellation Hydra

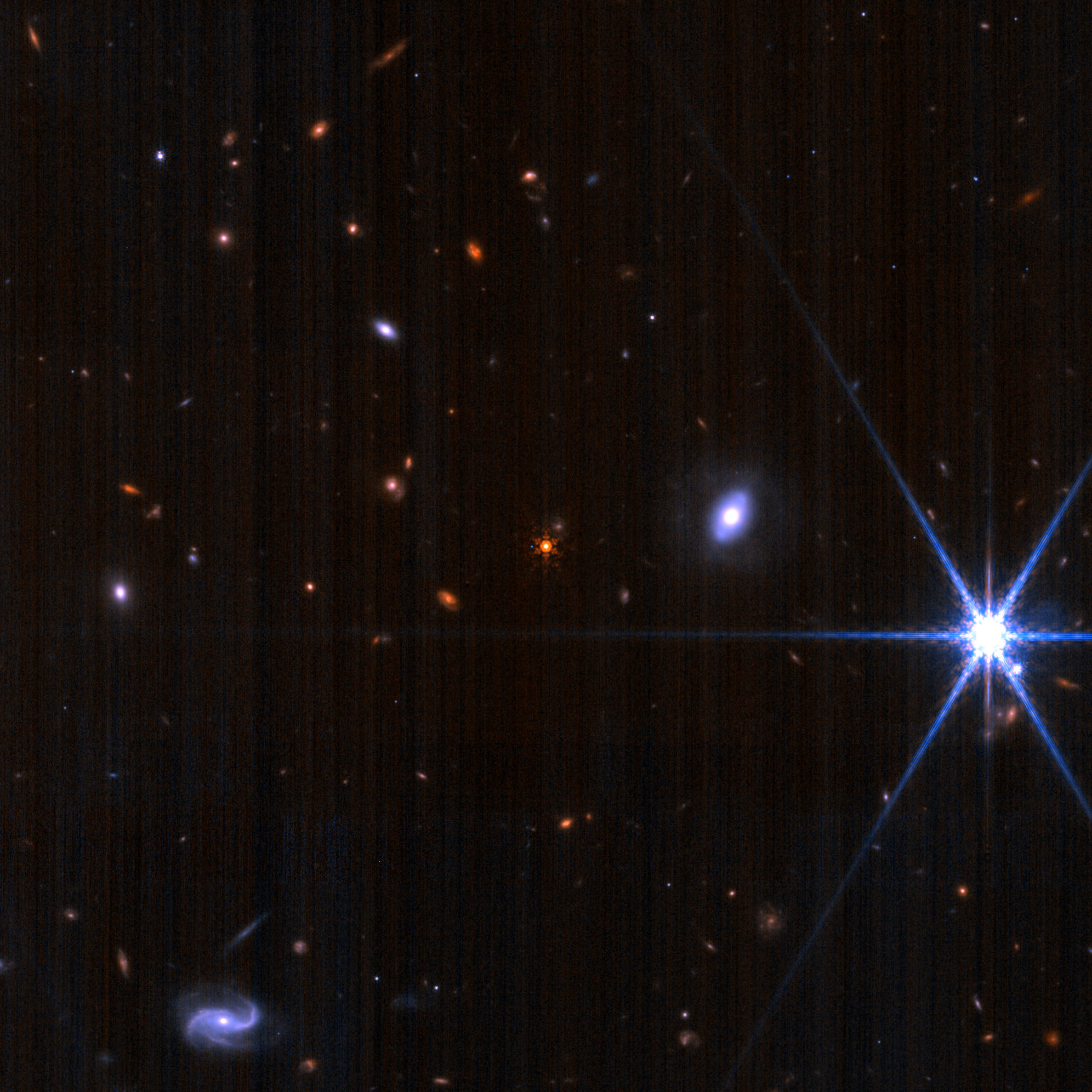
- JWST NIRCam image of WISEA J1141−3326 (faint orange "star" in the center)

Observation data Epoch J2000 Equinox J2000
- Constellation: Hydra
- Right ascension: 11^{h} 41^{m} 57.47^{s}
- Declination: −33° 26′ 34.57″

Characteristics
- Evolutionary stage: sub-brown dwarf
- Spectral type: Y0

Astrometry
Proper motion (μ)	RA: -910.9 ±1.9 mas/yr Dec.: -76.4 ±1.8 mas/yr
Parallax (π)	104.0±2.9 mas
Distance	31.4 ± 0.9 ly (9.6 ± 0.3 pc)

Details
Mass	3–8 M_{Jup}
Surface gravity (log g)	3.75–4.25 cgs
Temperature	460±79 K
Age	0.1–1.0 Gyr

Other designations
- CNS5 2863, WISEA J114156.67-332635.5, WISE J114156.71-332635.8

Database references
SIMBAD	data

WISEA J1141−3326 (WISE J114156.67-332635.5, W1141) is a Y-dwarf, which means it is one of the coldest directly imaged astronomical objects. It is likely a free-floating planetary-mass object.

W1141 was discovered in 2014 from data of the Wide-field Infrared Survey Explorer and at first the spectral type was estimated to be Y0, but no spectroscopic confirmation was present at the time. In 2017 a spectrum from Gemini South was published, confirming it as a Y0 spectral type. This work found it to be metal-rich, between 100 Myrs and 1 Gyr young and low-mass (3–8 M_{J}). It has a tangential velocity of about 41 km/s. It was found that this object overlapped with a background galaxy in early observations, which contaminated its apparent brightness and led to the false conclusion of a blue color.

== See also ==
- WISE 0855-0714
- List of Y-dwarfs
