= WISE 1639−6847 =

Brown dwarf in the constellation Triangulum Australe

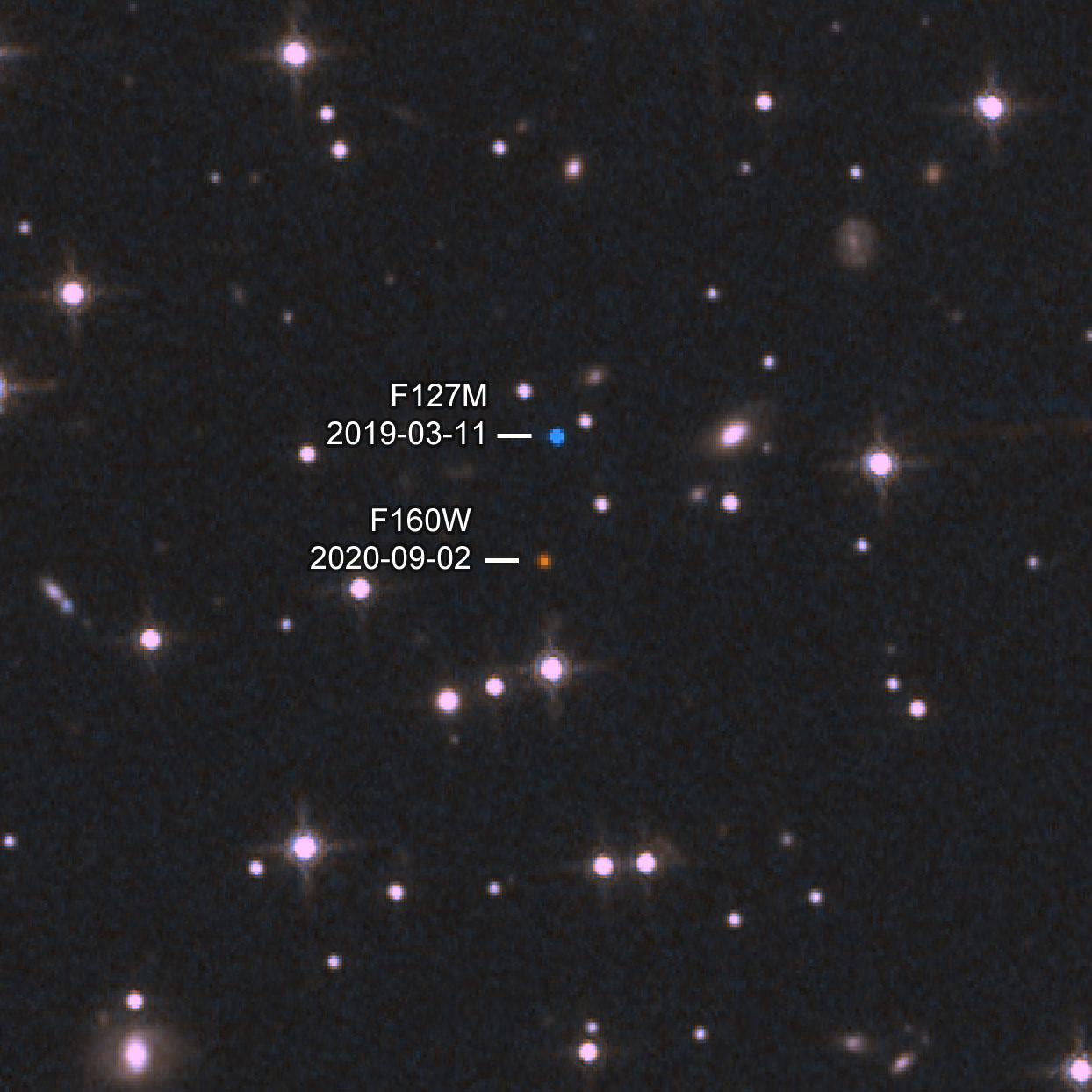
- WISE 1639-6847 in near-infrared with Hubble. It shows the brown dwarf moving within 1 ½ years Credit: Hubble Space Telescope; Fontanive et al.

Observation data Epoch J2000 Equinox ICRS
- Constellation: Triangulum Australe
- Right ascension: 16^{h} 39^{m} 39.730^{s}
- Declination: −68° 47′ 06.69″

Characteristics
- Spectral type: Y0 pec

Astrometry
Proper motion (μ)	RA: 576.94±0.22 mas/yr Dec.: −3108.48±0.21 mas/yr
Parallax (π)	211.11±0.56 mas
Distance	15.45 ± 0.04 ly (4.74 ± 0.01 pc)

Details
Rotation	6.69±0.05 h

Other designations
- GJ 12393,WISEPC J163940.83-684738.6; WISE 1639-6847; W1639

Database references
SIMBAD	data
- Location of WISE 1639−6847 in the constellation Triangulum Australe

WISE J163940.83−684738.6 (designation is abbreviated to WISE 1639−6847, or W1639) is a brown dwarf of spectral class Y0 pec, located in the constellation Triangulum Australe at 15.5 light-years from Earth. It is the closest star or brown dwarf in its constellation, and the second closest known Y dwarf as of February 2024.

== Discovery ==
WISE 1639−6847 was discovered in 2012 by C. G. Tinney et al. from data, collected by Wide-field Infrared Survey Explorer (WISE) Earth-orbiting satellite—NASA infrared-wavelength 40 cm (16 in) space telescope, which mission lasted from December 2009 to February 2011.

In 2012 Tinney et al. carried out follow-up observations of WISE 1639−6847 using the FourStar infrared mosaic camera mounted on the 6.5 m Magellan Baade telescope at Las Campanas Observatory, Chile (on 2012 May 10–11 (UT)); and spectroscopy using the Folded-port Infrared Echellette (FIRE) also mounted on the 6.5 m Magellan Baade telescope (on 2012 July 10 (UT)).

In 2012 Tinney et al. published a paper in The Astrophysical Journal, where they presented discovery of a newfound by WISE Y-type brown dwarf WISE 1639−6847 (the only brown dwarf discovery, presented in the article): the paper was accepted for publication on 20 September 2012, submitted to arXiv on 27 September 2012, and published in November 2012.

== Physical properties ==
WISE 1639−6847 has absolute magnitude in J-band 22.14 ± 0.22. WISE 1639−6847 was first classified to have a spectral type between Y0 and Y0.5. Observations with Hubble WFC3 near-infrared grism spectroscopy showed that the J-band peak matched with the Y0 standard. The Y-band peak and the Y-J color showed that it was unusual compared to other Y-dwarfs and therefore a spectral type of Y0 pec was applied. The pec stands for peculiar or unusual. Modelling of this Y-dwarf struggles to reproduce the spectrum. Only with rather unrealistic high temperature and low gravity it was possible to reproduce the spectrum.

== See also ==
- List of nearest stars and brown dwarfs
- List of Y-dwarfs
