= CWISE J1055+5443 =

Sub-brown dwarf/planet in the constellation Ursa Major

- CWISE J1055+5443 is the orange object in the center

Observation data Epoch 2000 Equinox 2000
- Constellation: Ursa Major
- Right ascension: 10^{h} 55^{m} 12.12^{s}
- Declination: 54° 43′ 28.3″

Characteristics
- Evolutionary stage: sub-brown dwarf
- Spectral type: Y0 pec ±0.5
- Apparent magnitude (J_{MKO}): 18.868 ±0.066
- Apparent magnitude (W1): 17.306 ±0.127
- Apparent magnitude (W2): 14.366 ±0.044
- Apparent magnitude (W3): 11.553 ±0.196

Astrometry
| Total velocity | >50.2 ±5.2 km/s |
| Proper motion (μ) | RA: −1518.7 ± 2.1 mas/yr Dec.: −222.7 ± 2.0 mas/yr |
| Parallax (π) | 145.0±14.7 mas |
| Distance | approx. 22 ly (approx. 6.9 pc) |

Details
| Mass | 4–6 M_{Jup} |
| Surface gravity (log g) | ≤4.5 cgs |
| Temperature | 500 ± 150 K |
| Age | 180 ± 9 Myr |

Other designations
- CWISE J105512.11+544328.3, WISEA J105512.93+544329.7

Database references
| SIMBAD | data |

CWISE J1055+5443 (CWISE J105512.11+544328.3) is a (sub-)brown dwarf with the spectral type of Y0 (pec). It is around 22 light years distant from earth.

== Discovery ==
CWISE J1055+5443 was first identified as either a WISE galaxy or dwarf candidate by Griffith et al. in 2012. CWISE J1055+5443 was independently discovered as a close brown dwarf in 2021 by Kirkpatrick et al. using the Wide-field Infrared Survey Explorer (WISE) and follow-up observations using the Spitzer Space Telescope. Dan Caselden, Samuel J. Goodman and J. Davy Kirkpatrick are the discoverers of this object. Two of these are citizen scientists of the Backyard Worlds project. Originally it was estimated that this object is a subdwarf with the spectral type T8. The spectral type was uncertain at that time. Follow-up observations with Keck/NIRES found it to be a nearby and unusual blue Y-dwarf.

== Physical properties ==
A Spitzer follow-up program found a parallax of 145.0±14.7 mas, which corresponds to a close distance of around 7 parsec. The follow-up paper found that the J-band spectrum matches well with the Y0 standard. The spectrum in the YJHK bands do on the other hand not match with any standard. Ammonia (NH_{3}) and methane (CH_{4}) abundances, as well as Spitzer ch2 (4.5 μm) magnitude also match an early Y-type object. Absorption due to water vapor (H_{2}O) was also detected in the spectrum. CWISE J1055+5443 shows peculiar colors. It is one of the reddest object in WISE W2–W3 colors and the Spitzer color (ch1−ch2 = 1.84±0.04) is the bluest among spectroscopically confirmed Y-dwarfs. Only the unconfirmed metal-poor Y-dwarf candidate WISE 1534–1043 is bluer at this wavelength.

The spectrum was compared to LOWZ models and Sonora Bobcat grid, but no satisfactory model fit was achieved. The best fits require a low surface gravity and it is suspected that models with an even lower gravity are required to produce a better fit. A low gravity is often seen as an indicator for a low mass and a young age for brown dwarfs. Using the astrometry of CWISE J1055+5443 the researchers found that it has a 98.2% probability to belong to the nearby candidate moving group Crius 197, which contains 10 young stars and is about 180 ± 9 Myr old. Assuming this group is real and CWISE J1055+5443 is a member of this group, then it would have a mass of 4–6 M_{J}. The membership to this group and potential young age of CWISE J1055+5443 is not certain and follow-up observations are needed to confirm this.

== See also ==
- List of Y-dwarfs
- List of star systems within 20–25 light-years
- List of nearby stellar associations and moving groups
- WISE 1405+5534
