= Ross 19 =

Red dwarf in the constellation Triangulum

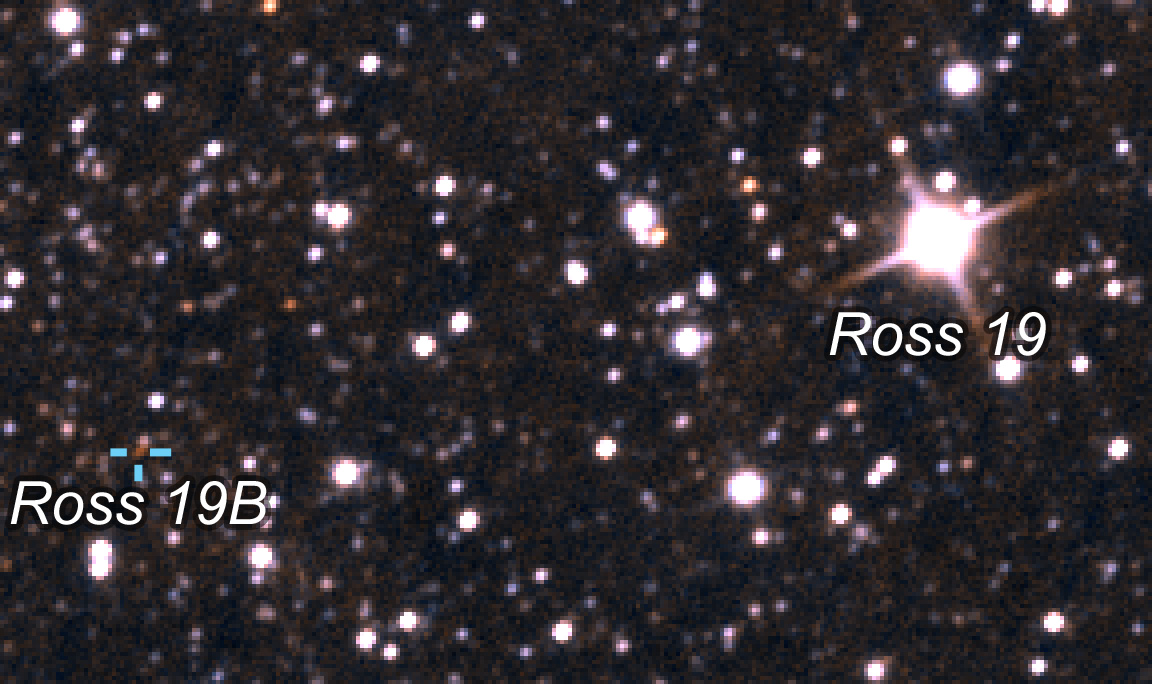
- Ross 19A (bright star) and Ross 19B (marked with a blue cross-hair); Credit: NASA WISE & unWISE (Meisner et al. 2022) & Melina Thévenot

Observation data Epoch J2000 Equinox ICRS
- Constellation: Triangulum
- Ross 19A
- Right ascension: 02^{h} 19^{m} 03.0092^{s}
- Declination: +35° 21′ 18.601″
- Apparent magnitude (V): 12.70
- Ross 19B
- Right ascension: 02^{h} 19^{m} 48.68^{s}
- Declination: +35° 18′ 45.3″

Characteristics
- Evolutionary stage: red dwarf + brown dwarf
- Spectral type: M3.5 + T9-Y0

Astrometry

Ross 19A
Radial velocity (R_{v})	−27.80 ± 0.14 km/s
Proper motion (μ)	RA: 670.532 ± 0.042 mas/yr Dec.: −427.412 ± 0.040 mas/yr
Parallax (π)	57.3276±0.0398 mas
Distance	56.89 ± 0.04 ly (17.44 ± 0.01 pc)

Ross 19B
Proper motion (μ)	RA: 673.2 ± 46.4 mas/yr Dec.: −504.4 ± 57.0 mas/yr
Distance	17.58 ± 3.75 pc

Details

Ross 19A
Mass	0.362 ± 0.007 M_{☉}
Radius	3.38 ± 0.03 R_{Jup}
Temperature	3481 ± 49 K
Metallicity [Fe/H]	−0.40 ± 0.12 dex
Age	7.2+3.8 −3.6 Gyr

Ross 19B
Mass	15–40 M_{Jup}
Temperature	500+115 −100 K

Position (relative to Ross 19A)
Component	Ross 19B
Angular distance	568″
Projected separation	9900 AU

Other designations
- Ci 20 165, GJ 94, LHS 1388, NLTT 7619, LTT 10785, G 74-14, G 134-26, LSPM J0219+3521, 2MASS J02190305+3521181, WISEA J021903.58+352114.1
- Ross 19B: CWISE J021948.68+351845.3

Database references

Ross 19A
SIMBAD	data

Ross 19B
SIMBAD	data

Ross 19 is a red dwarf of spectral type M3.5. In 2021 it was discovered that Ross 19 has a companion, which is a cold brown dwarf. Ross 19B is likely the coldest brown dwarf found around a main-sequence star, as of July 2024.

== Ross 19A ==
Ross 19A was discovered in 1925 by Frank E. Ross as a proper-motion star with the help of the Yerkes Observatory and archived plates by E. E. Barnard. In 1985 the first spectral information was published by W. P. Bidelman, based on observations by G. P. Kuiper, which reported the star to have a V magnitude of 12.70 and a spectral type of M3.5. In 2020 the star was observed at the Lick Observatory and with IRTF. Ross 19A has a mass of about 0.36 M_{☉} and has an age between 3.6 and 11 billion years. It has a sub-solar metallicity and has a temperature of about 3500 Kelvin. In TESS and ZTF light curves it does not show any variability and does not show any flares.

== Ross 19B ==
Ross 19B (also called CWISE J021948.68+351845.3) was initially found in the Backyard Worlds project by the citizen scientists Samuel Goodman, Léopold Gramaize, Austin Rothermich, and Hunter Brooks. It was then observed by the professional astronomers of the paper led by Adam C. Schneider with the Keck Observatory in 2020, measuring a J-band magnitude of 21.14 ± 0.02. The researchers calculated that Ross 19B has a 100% probability to be bound to Ross 19A. Ross 19B has a very low temperature of about 400–615 kelvins (127–342 °C; 260–647 °F), making it either a late T-dwarf or a Y-dwarf. It has a mass between 15 and 40 M_{J}, making it a brown dwarf. Its wide separation results in an extremely low gravitational binding energy. It is suggested that Ross 19B has a sub-solar metallicity similar to the red dwarf. Later observation with Gemini North showed a Y-band magnitude of 21.86 ± 0.06. This showed that the spectral type is likely between T9 and Y0. A James Webb Space Telescope program is dedicated to observe Ross 19B in Cycle 3.

== See also ==
- List of Y-dwarfs
- Wolf 1130C – another cold metal-poor companion
- WD 0806-661B – a Y-dwarf companion to a white dwarf
