= Rogue planet =

Planet not gravitationally bound to a star

This video shows an artist's impression of the free-floating planet (or brown dwarf) CFBDSIR J214947.2-040308.9.

A rogue planet, also termed a free-floating planet (FFP) or an isolated planetary-mass object (iPMO), is an interstellar object of planetary mass which is not gravitationally bound to any star or brown dwarf.

Rogue planets may originate from planetary systems in which they are formed and later ejected, or they can also form on their own, outside a planetary system. The Milky Way alone may have billions to trillions of rogue planets, a range the Nancy Grace Roman Space Telescope is expected to refine. The odds of a rogue planet entering the solar system, much less posing a direct threat to life on Earth, are vanishingly small: celestial mechanics professor Cassidy Ward has estimated the odds of a rogue planet entering the solar system in the next 1,000 years to be one in a billion.

Some planetary-mass objects may have formed in a way similar to how stars form, and the International Astronomical Union has proposed that such objects be called sub-brown dwarfs. A possible example is Cha 110913−773444, which may have either been ejected and become a rogue planet or formed on its own to become a sub-brown dwarf.

== Terminology ==
The two first discovery papers use the names isolated planetary-mass objects (iPMOs) and free-floating planets (FFPs). Most astronomical papers use one of these terms. Rogue planet is more often used for microlensing studies, which also often use FFP. A press release intended for the public might use an alternative name. Press releases regarding the discoveries of at least 70 FFPs in 2021, for example, used the terms rogue planet, starless planet, wandering planet and free-floating planet.

== Discovery ==
Isolated planetary-mass objects (iPMO) were first discovered in 2000 by the UK team P. W. Lucas & P. F. Roche with UKIRT in the Orion Nebula. In the same year the Spanish team María Rosa Zapatero Osorio et al. discovered iPMOs with Keck spectroscopy in the σ Orionis cluster. The spectroscopy of the objects in the Orion Nebula was published in 2001. Both European teams are now recognized for their quasi-simultaneous discoveries. In 1999 the Japanese team Yumiko Oasa et al. discovered objects in Chamaeleon I that were spectroscopically confirmed years later in 2004 by the US team Kevin Luhman et al.

== Observation ==
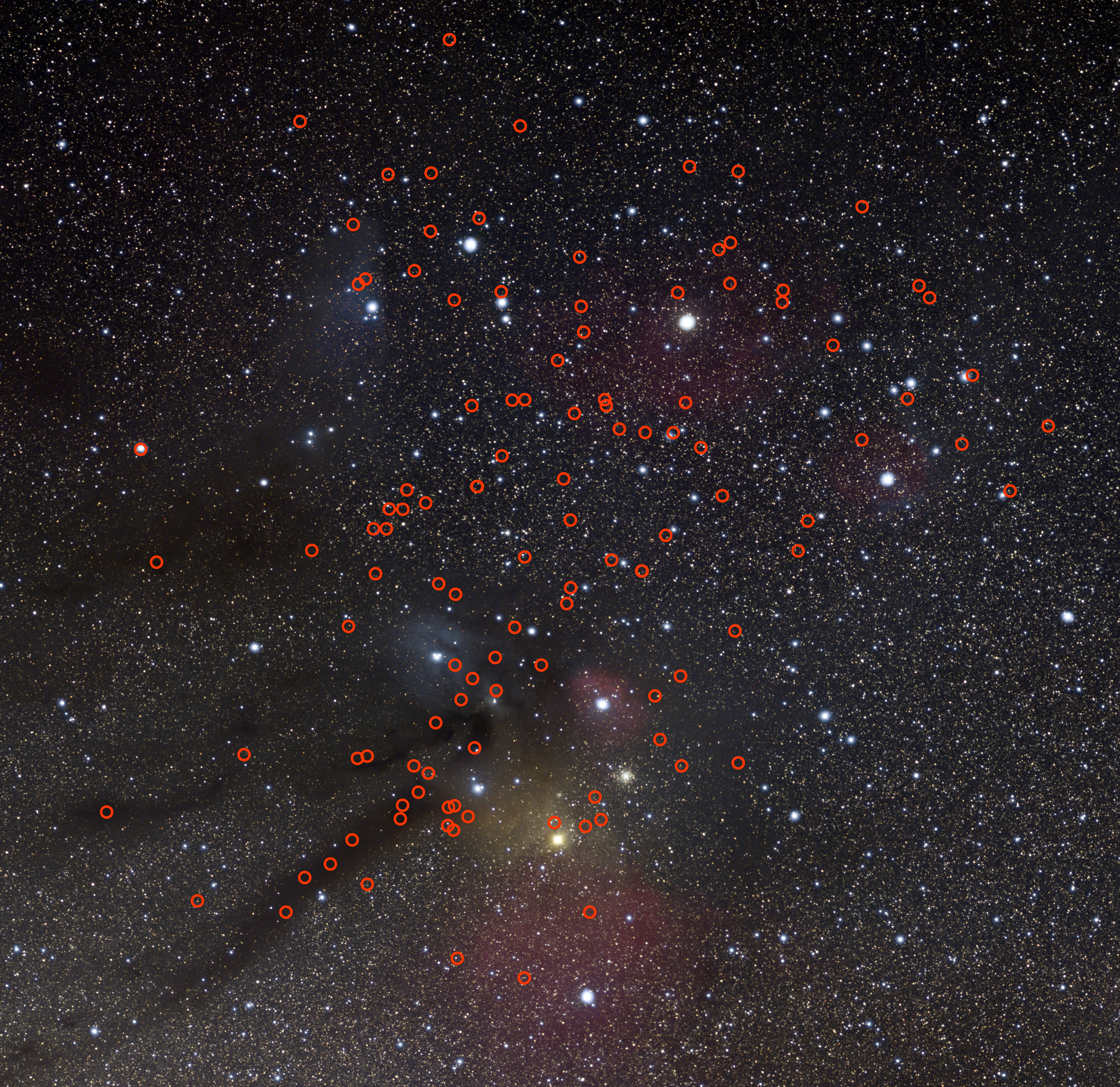
115 potential rogue planets in the region between Upper Scorpius and Ophiuchus (2021)

There are three techniques to discover free-floating planets: microlensing, direct imaging, and transiting.

=== Microlensing ===
Astrophysicist Takahiro Sumi of Osaka University in Japan and colleagues, who form the Microlensing Observations in Astrophysics and the Optical Gravitational Lensing Experiment collaborations, published their study of microlensing in 2011. They observed 50 million stars in the Milky Way by using the 1.8-metre (5 ft 11 in) MOA-II telescope at New Zealand's Mount John Observatory and the 1.3-metre (4 ft 3 in) University of Warsaw telescope at Chile's Las Campanas Observatory. They found 474 incidents of microlensing, ten of which were brief enough to be planets of around Jupiter's size with no associated star in the immediate vicinity. The researchers estimated from their observations that there are nearly two Jupiter-mass rogue planets for every star in the Milky Way. One study suggested a much larger number, up to 100,000 times more rogue planets than stars in the Milky Way, though this study encompassed hypothetical objects much smaller than Jupiter. A 2017 study by Przemek Mróz of Warsaw University Observatory and colleagues, with six times larger statistics than the 2011 study, indicates an upper limit on Jupiter-mass free-floating or wide-orbit planets of 0.25 planets per main-sequence star in the Milky Way.

In September 2020, astronomers using microlensing techniques reported the detection, for the first time, of an Earth-mass rogue planet (named OGLE-2016-BLG-1928) unbound to any star and free floating in the Milky Way galaxy.

=== Direct imaging ===
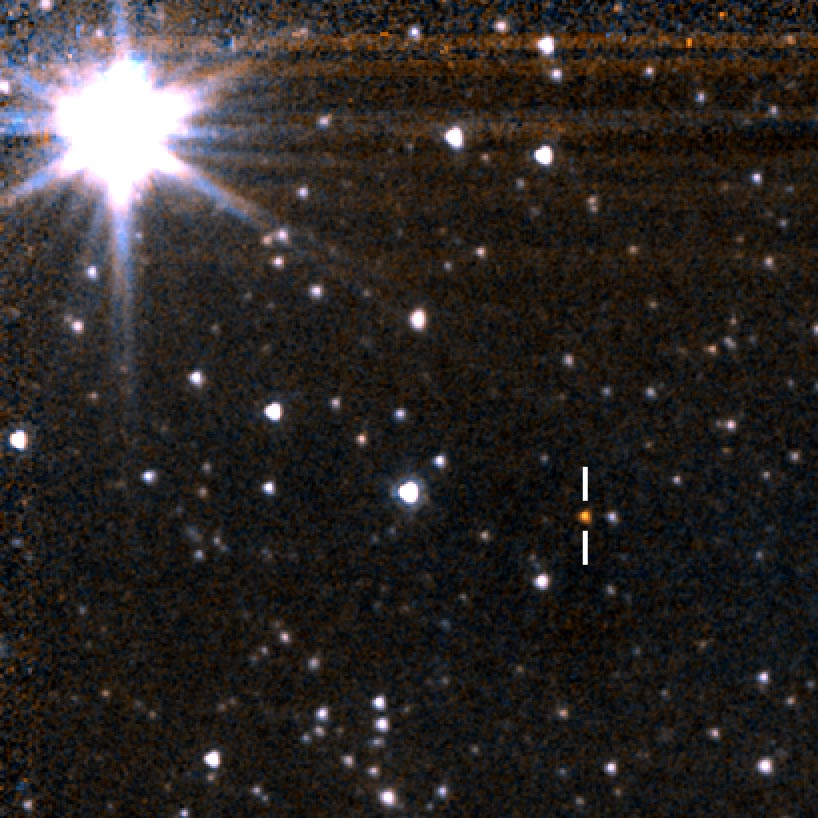
The cold planetary-mass object WISE J0830+2837 (marked orange object) observed with the Spitzer Space Telescope. It has a temperature of 300–350 K (27–77 °C; 80–170 °F).

Microlensing planets can only be studied by means of microlensing events, making the characterization of such planets difficult. Astronomers therefore turn to isolated planetary-mass objects that were found via the direct imaging method. To determine a mass of a brown dwarf or iPMO one needs for example the luminosity and the age of an object. Determining the age of a low-mass object has proven to be difficult. The vast majority of iPMOs are found inside young nearby star-forming regions of which astronomers know their age. These objects are younger than 200 Myrs, are massive (>5 M_{J}) and belong to the L- and T-dwarfs. There is, however, a small growing sample of cold and old Y-dwarfs that have estimated masses of 8–20 M_{J}. Nearby rogue planet candidates of spectral type Y include WISE 0855−0714 at a distance of 7.27±0.13 light-years. If this sample of Y-dwarfs can be characterized with more accurate measurements or if a way to better characterize their ages can be found, the number of old and cold iPMOs will likely increase significantly.

The first iPMOs were discovered in the early 2000s via direct imaging inside young star-forming regions. These iPMOs found via direct imaging formed probably like stars (sometimes called sub-brown dwarf). There might be iPMOs that form like a planet, which are then ejected. These objects will, however, be kinematically different from their natal star-forming region, should not be surrounded by a circumstellar disk and have high metallicity. None of the iPMOs found inside young star-forming regions show a high velocity compared to their star-forming region. For old iPMOs the cold WISE J0830+2837 shows a V_{tan} (tangential velocity) of about 100 km/s, which is high, but still consistent with formation in our galaxy. For WISE 1534–1043 one alternative scenario explains this object as an ejected exoplanet due to its high V_{tan} of about 200 km/s, but its color suggests it is an old metal-poor brown dwarf. Most astronomers studying massive iPMOs believe that they represent the low-mass end of the star-formation process.

Astronomers have used the Herschel Space Observatory and the Very Large Telescope to observe a very young free-floating planetary-mass object, OTS 44, and demonstrate that the processes characterizing the canonical star-like mode of formation apply to isolated objects down to a few Jupiter masses. Herschel far-infrared observations have shown that OTS 44 is surrounded by a disk of at least 10 Earth masses and thus could eventually form a large satellite system. Spectroscopic observations of OTS 44 with the SINFONI spectrograph at the Very Large Telescope have revealed that the disk is actively accreting matter, similar to the disks of young stars.

=== Transiting ===
Astonomers have observed at least one object via transiting. J1407b is an astronomical object proposed to explain a series of eclipse-like dimming events observed in the star V1400 Centauri during 2007.

=== Binaries ===
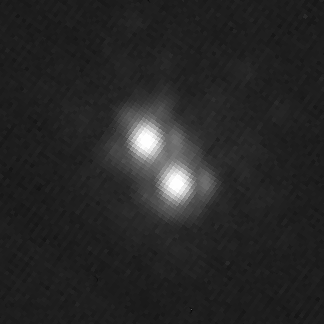
2MASS J1119–1137AB, the first planetary-mass binary discovered, located in the TW Hydrae association

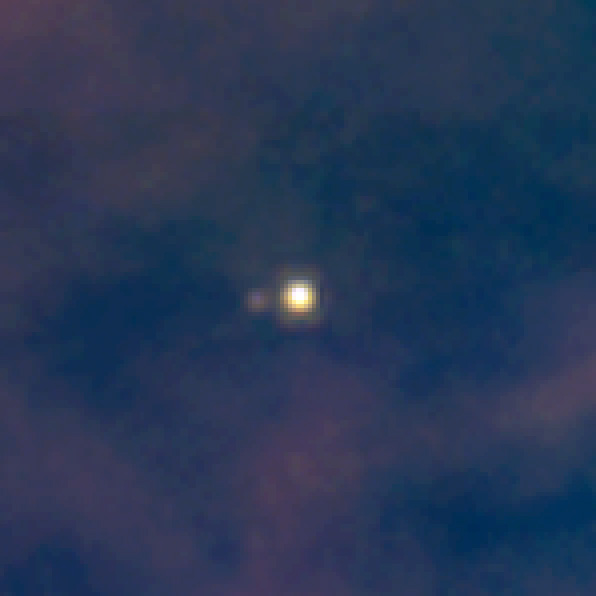
JuMBO 29, a candidate 12.5+3 M_{J} binary, separated by 135 AU, located in the Orion Nebula

The first discovery of a resolved planetary-mass binary was 2MASS J1119–1137AB. There are, however, other binaries known, such as 2MASS J1553022+153236AB, WISE 1828+2650, WISE 0146+4234, WISE J0336−0143 (could also be a brown dwarf and a planetary-mass object (BD+PMO) binary), NIRISS-NGC1333-12 and several objects discovered by Zhang et al.

In the Orion Nebula a population of forty wide binaries and two triple systems was discovered. The discovery was surprising for two reasons: the trend of binaries of brown dwarfs predicted a decrease of distance between low mass objects with decreasing mass. It was also predicted that the binary fraction decreases with mass. These binaries were named Jupiter-mass Binary Objects (JuMBOs); they make up at least 9% of the iPMOs and have a separation smaller than 340 AU. It is unclear how these JuMBOs formed, but an extensive study argued that they formed in situ, like stars. If they formed like stars, then there must be an unknown "extra ingredient" to allow them to form. If they formed like planets and were later ejected, then it has to be explained why these binaries did not break apart during the ejection process. Future measurements with JWST might resolve if these objects formed as ejected planets or as stars. Kevin Luhman reanalysed the NIRCam data and found that most JuMBOs did not appear in his sample of substellar objects. Moreover, the color was consistent with reddened background sources or low signal-to-noise sources. He considers only JuMBO 29 as a good candidate for a binary planetary-mass system.

=== Total number of known iPMOs ===
There are likely hundreds of known candidate iPMOs, over a hundred objects with spectra and a small but growing number of candidates discovered via microlensing. Some large surveys include:

As of December 2021, the largest-ever group of rogue planets was discovered, numbering at least 70 and up to 170 depending on the assumed age. They are found in the OB association between Upper Scorpius and Ophiuchus with masses between 4 and 13 M_{J} and age around 3–10 million years, and were most likely formed by either gravitational collapse of gas clouds, or formation in a protoplanetary disk followed by ejection due to dynamical instabilities. Follow-up observations with spectroscopy from the Subaru Telescope and Gran Telescopio Canarias showed that the contamination of this sample is quite low (≤6%). The 16 young objects had a mass between 3 and 14 M_{J}, confirming that they are indeed planetary-mass objects.

In October 2023, an even larger group of 540 planetary-mass object candidates was discovered in the Trapezium Cluster and inner Orion Nebula with JWST. The objects have a mass between 13 and 0.6 M_{J}. A number of these objects formed wide binaries, which was not predicted.

== Formation ==
There are in general two scenarios that can lead to the formation of an isolated planetary-mass object (iPMO). It can form like a planet around a star and is then ejected, or it forms like a low-mass star or brown dwarf in isolation. This can influence its composition and motion.

Recent research indicates that rogue planets may form both through direct gravitational collapse within stellar nurseries and through ejection from their natal planetary systems, later interacting with established systems and influencing their orbital architectures and overall demographics. Many of these objects likely originated within planetary systems before being dynamically expelled, while others may have formed in isolation. Besides altering system stability during close encounters or possible capture events, rogue planets can also deliver volatiles that enhance prebiotic chemistry and create conditions conducive to increased biological diversity. These combined formation, dynamical, biochemical, and ecological effects play a significant role in shaping the distribution and evolution of exoplanetary systems.

=== Formation like a star ===
Objects with a mass of at least one Jupiter mass were thought to be able to form via collapse and fragmentation of molecular clouds from models in 2001. Pre-JWST observations have shown that objects below 3–5 M_{J} are unlikely to form on their own. Observations in 2023 in the Trapezium Cluster with JWST have shown that objects as massive as 0.6 M_{J} might form on their own, not requiring a steep cut-off mass. A particular type of globule, called globulettes, are thought to be birthplaces for brown dwarfs and planetary-mass objects. Globulettes are found in the Rosette Nebula and IC 1805. Sometimes young iPMOs are still surrounded by a disk that could form exomoons. Due to the tight orbit of this type of exomoon around their host planet, they have a high chance of 10–15% to be transiting.

==== Disks ====
Some very young star-forming regions, typically younger than five million years, sometimes contain isolated planetary-mass objects with infrared excess and signs of accretion. Most well known is the iPMO OTS 44 discovered to have a disk and being located in Chamaeleon I. Chamaeleon I and II have other candidate iPMOs with disks. Other star-forming regions with iPMOs with disks or accretion are Lupus I, Rho Ophiuchi Cloud Complex, Sigma Orionis cluster, Orion Nebula, Taurus, NGC 1333 and IC 348. A large survey of disks around brown dwarfs and iPMOs with ALMA found that these disks are not massive enough to form earth-mass planets. There is still the possibility that the disks already have formed planets. Studies of red dwarfs have shown that some have gas-rich disks at a relative old age. These disks were dubbed Peter Pan Disks and this trend could continue into the planetary-mass regime. One Peter Pan disk is the 45 Myr old brown dwarf 2MASS J02265658-5327032 with a mass of about 13.7 M_{J}, which is close to the planetary-mass regime. Recent studies of the nearby planetary-mass object 2MASS J11151597+1937266 found that this nearby iPMO is surrounded by a disk. It shows signs of accretion from the disk and also infrared excess. In May 2025 researchers using JWST found that the disk around Cha 1107−7626 contains hydrocarbons. Cha 1107−7626 (6–10 M_{J}) is one of the lowest-mass objects with a dusty disk. Additional JWST spectroscopy did show that silicates and hydrocarbons are a common feature in disks of planetary-mass objects. The disks showed strong evidence of grain growth and crystallization, similar to what is seen in disks around brown dwarfs and stars. This showed that these disks are capable to form rocky companions.

=== Formation like a planet ===
Ejected planets are predicted to be mostly low-mass (<30 M_{🜨} Figure 1 Ma et al.) and their mean mass depends on the mass of their host star. Simulations by Ma et al. did show that 17.5% of one M_{☉} stars eject a total of 16.8 M_{🜨} per star with a typical (median) mass of 0.8 M_{🜨} for an individual free-floating planet (FFP). For lower mass red dwarfs with a mass of 0.3 M_{☉} 12% of stars eject a total of 5.1 M_{🜨} per star with a typical mass of 0.3 M_{🜨} for an individual FFP.

Hong et al. predicted that exomoons can be scattered by planet-planet interactions and become ejected exomoons. Higher mass (0.3–1 M_{J}) ejected FFP are predicted to be possible, but they are also predicted to be rare. Ejection of a planet can occur via planet-planet scatter or due a stellar flyby. Another possibility is the ejection of a fragment of a disk that then forms into a planetary-mass object. Another suggested scenario is the ejection of planets in a tilted circumbinary orbit. Interactions with the central binary and the planets with each other can lead to the ejection of the lower-mass planet in the system. Although the effectiveness of this mechanism depends on the encounter geometry, which is not well constrained yet both observationally and theoretically.

=== Formation via encounters between young circumstellar disks ===
Encounters between young circumstellar disks, which are marginally gravitationally stable, can produce elongated tidal bridges that collapse locally to form iPMOs. These iPMOs host expansive disks similar to observations, which the ejected planet hyperthesis can hardly explain. They also have a high multiplicity fraction in their formation, as suggested by iPMOs in the Trapezium cluster. Although the effectiveness of this mechanism depends on the encounter geometry, which is not well constrained yet both observationally and theoretically.

=== Other scenarios ===
If a stellar or brown dwarf embryo experiences a halted accretion, it could remain low-mass enough to become a planetary-mass object. Such a halted accretion could occur if the embryo is ejected or if its circumstellar disk experiences photoevaporation near O-stars. Objects that formed via the ejected embryo scenario would have smaller or no disk and the fraction of binaries decreases for such objects. It could also be that free-floating planetary-mass objects form from a combination of scenarios.

== Fate ==
Most isolated planetary-mass objects will float in interstellar space forever.

Some iPMOs will have a close encounter with a planetary system. This rare encounter can have three outcomes: The iPMO will remain unbound, it could be weakly bound to the star, or it could "kick out" an exoplanet, replacing it. Simulations have shown that the vast majority of these encounters result in a capture event with the iPMO being weakly bound with a low gravitational binding energy and an elongated highly eccentric orbit. These orbits are not stable and 90% of these objects gain energy due to planet-planet encounters and are ejected back into interstellar space. Only 1% of all stars will experience this temporary capture.

== Warmth ==
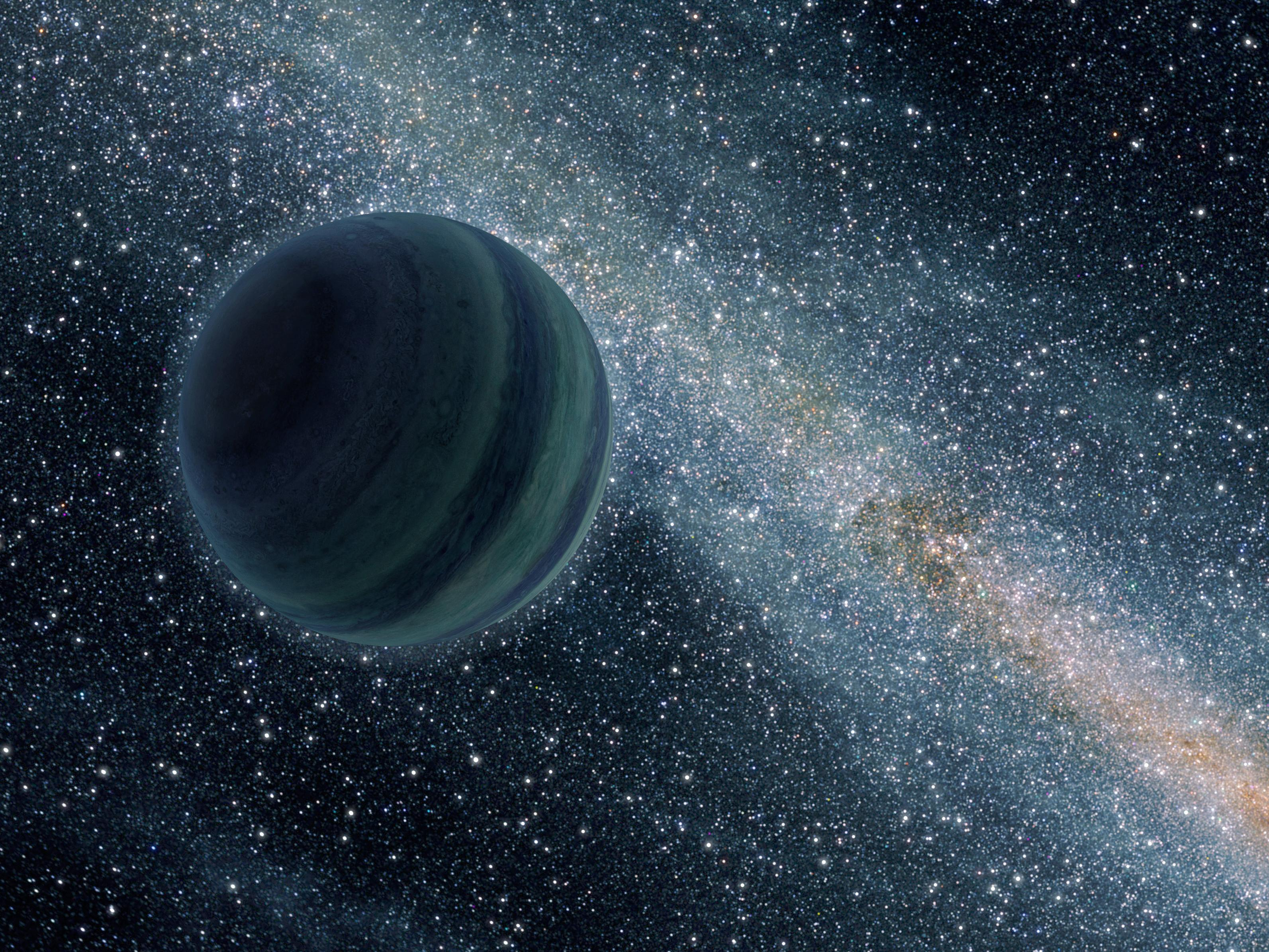
Artist's conception of a Jupiter-size rogue planet

Interstellar planets generate little heat and are not heated by a star. However, in 1998, David J. Stevenson theorized that some planet-sized objects adrift in interstellar space might sustain a thick atmosphere that would not freeze out. He proposed that these atmospheres would be preserved by the pressure-induced far-infrared radiation opacity of a thick hydrogen-containing atmosphere.

During planetary-system formation, several small protoplanetary bodies may be ejected from the system. An ejected body would receive less of the stellar-generated ultraviolet light that can strip away the lighter elements of its atmosphere. Even an Earth-sized body would have enough gravity to prevent the escape of the hydrogen and helium in its atmosphere. In an Earth-sized object the geothermal energy from residual core radioisotope decay could maintain a surface temperature above the melting point of water, allowing liquid-water oceans to exist. These planets are likely to remain geologically active for long periods. If they have geodynamo-created protective magnetospheres and sea floor volcanism, hydrothermal vents could provide energy for life. These bodies would be difficult to detect because of their weak thermal microwave radiation emissions, although reflected solar radiation and far-infrared thermal emissions may be detectable from an object that is less than 1,000 astronomical units from Earth. Around five percent of Earth-sized ejected planets with Moon-sized natural satellites would retain their satellites after ejection. A large satellite would be a source of significant geological tidal heating.

== Lists ==
The tables in the following sections list rogue planets, confirmed or suspected, that have been discovered. It is yet unknown whether these planets were ejected from orbiting a star or else formed on their own as sub-brown dwarfs. Whether exceptionally low-mass rogue planets (such as OGLE-2012-BLG-1323 and KMT-2019-BLG-2073) are even capable of being formed on their own is currently unknown.

=== Discovered via direct imaging ===
These objects were discovered with the direct imaging method. Many were discovered in young star-clusters or stellar associations and a few old are known (such as WISE 0855−0714). List is sorted after discovery year.

Exoplanet	Mass (M_{J})	Age (Myr)	Distance (ly)	Spectral type	Status	Stellar assoc. membership	Discovery
OTS 44	~11.5	0.5–3	554	M9.5	Likely a low-mass brown dwarf	Chamaeleon I	1998
S Ori 52	2–8	1–5	1,150		Age and mass uncertain; may be a foreground brown dwarf	σ Orionis cluster	2000
Proplyd 061-401	~11	1	1,344	L4–L5	Candidate, 15 candidates in total from this work	Orion nebula	2001
S Ori 70	3	3	1150	T6	interloper?	σ Orionis cluster	2002
Cha 110913-773444	5–15	2~	529	>M9.5	Confirmed	Chamaeleon I	2004
SIMP J013656.5+093347	11-13	200~	20–22	T2.5	Candidate	Carina-Near moving group	2006
Cha 1107−7626	6–10	1–5	620	L0–L1	Confirmed	Chamaeleon I	2008
UGPS J072227.51−054031.2	0.66–16.02	1000 – 5000	13	T9	Mass uncertain	none	2010
M10-4450	2–3	1	325	T	Candidate	rho Ophiuchi cloud	2010
WISE 1828+2650	3–6 or 0.5–20	2–4 or 0.1–10	47	>Y2	candidate, could be binary	none	2011
WISEA J1141−3326	3–8	0.1–1.0	31.4±0.9	Y0	Y-dwarf	none	2014
WISE 0825+2805	3.7±0.2	414±23	21.4±0.3	Y0.5	Candidate; age is assumed based on probable moving group association. The mass and radius depends on the object's age.	Corona of Ursa Major moving group	2015
CFBDSIR 2149−0403	4–7	110–130	117–143	T7	Candidate	AB Doradus moving group	2012
SONYC-NGC1333-36	~6	1	978	L3	candidate, NGC 1333 has two other objects with masses below 15 M_{J}	NGC 1333	2012
SSTc2d J183037.2+011837	2–4	3	848–1354	T?	Candidate, also called ID 4	Serpens Core cluster (in the Serpens Cloud)	2012
PSO J318.5−22	6.24–7.60	21–27	72.32	L7	Confirmed; also known as 2MASS J21140802-2251358	Beta Pictoris Moving group	2013
2MASS J2208+2921	11–13	21–27	115	L3γ	Candidate; radial velocity needed	Beta Pictoris Moving group	2014
WISE J1741-4642	4–21	23–130		L7pec	Candidate	Beta Pictoris or AB Doradus moving group	2014
WISE 0855−0714	3–10	>1,000	7.1	Y4	Age uncertain, but old due to solar vicinity object; candidate even for an old age of 12 Gyrs (age of the universe is 13.8 Gyrs). Closest known probable rogue planet	none	2014
2MASS J12074836–3900043	~15	7–13	200	L1	Candidate; distance needed	TW Hydrae association	2014
SIMP J2154–1055	9–11	30–50	63	L4β	Age questioned	Argus association	2014
SDSS J111010.01+011613.1	10.83–11.73	110–130	63	T5.5	Confirmed	AB Doradus moving group	2015
2MASS J11193254–1137466 AB	4–8	7–13	~90	L7	Binary candidate, one of the components has a candidate exomoon or variable atmosphere	TW Hydrae association	2016
WISEA 1147	5–13	7–13	~100	L7	Candidate	TW Hydrae association	2016
USco J155150.2-213457	8–10	6.907-10	104	L6	Candidate, low gravity	Upper Scorpius association	2016
Proplyd 133–353	<13	0.5–1	1,344	M9.5	Candidate with a photoevaporating disk	Orion nebula	2016
Cha J11110675-7636030	3–6	1–3	520–550	M9–L2	Candidate, but could be surrounded by a disk, which could make it a sub-brown dwarf; other candidates from this work	Chamaeleon I	2017
PSO J077.1+24	6	1–2	470	L2	Candidate, work also published another candidate in Taurus	Taurus Molecular Cloud	2017
2MASS J1115+1937	6+8 −4	5–45	147	L2γ	has an accretion disk	Field, possibly ejected	2017
Calar 25	11–12	120	435		Confirmed	Pleiades	2018
2MASS J1324+6358	10.7–11.8	~150	~33	T2	unusually red and unlikely binary; robust candidate	AB Doradus moving group	2007, 2018
WISE J0830+2837	4-13	>1,000	31.3-42.7	>Y1	Age uncertain, but old because of high velocity (high Vtan is indicative of an old stellar population), Candidate if younger than 10 Gyrs	none	2020
2MASS J0718-6415	3 ± 1	16–28	30.5	T5	Candidate member of the BPMG. Extremely short rotation period of 1.08 hours, comparable to the brown dwarf 2MASS J0348-6022.	Beta Pictoris Moving group	2021
DANCe J16081299-2304316	3.1–6.3	3–10	104	L6	One of at least 70 candidates published in this work, spectrum similar to HR 8799c	Upper Scorpius association	2021
WISE J2255−3118	2.15–2.59	24	~45	T8	very red, candidate confirmed?	Beta Pictoris Moving group	2011, 2021
WISE J024124.73-365328.0	4.64–5.30	45	~61	T7	candidate	Argus association	2012, 2021
2MASS J0013−1143	7.29–8.25	45	~82	T4	binary candidate or composite atmosphere, candidate	Argus association	2017, 2021
SDSS J020742.48+000056.2	7.11–8.61	45	~112	T4.5	candidate	Argus association	2002, 2021
2MASSI J0453264-175154	12.68–12.98	24	~99	L2.5β	low gravity, candidate	Beta Pictoris Moving group	2003, 2023
CWISE J0506+0738	7 ± 2	22	104	L8γ–T0γ	Candidate member of the BPMG. Extreme red near-infrared colors.	Beta Pictoris Moving group	2023
WISE J2354+0240	12-15	6000	25 ± 0.6	Y1	One of the coldest directly imaged objects. It has a 85.2% probability of belonging to the group HSC517.	HSC517	2015

=== Discovered via microlensing ===
These objects were discovered via microlensing. Rogue planets discovered via microlensing can only be studied by the lensing event. Some of them could also be exoplanets in a wide orbit around an unseen star.

Exoplanet	Mass (M_{J})	Mass (M_{🜨})	Distance (ly)	Status	Year of Announcement
OGLE-2012-BLG-1323L	0.0072–0.072	2.3–23		candidate; distance needed	2017
OGLE-2017-BLG-0560L	1.9–20	604–3,256		candidate; distance needed	2017
MOA-2015-BLG-337L	9.85	3,130	23,156	may be a binary brown dwarf instead	2018
OGLE-2017-BLG-1170L	3.06+1.34 −1.16		24,700	candidate	2019
OGLE-2017-BLG-1170L	1.85+0.79 −0.70		24,700	candidate	2019
OGLE-2016-BLG-1928L	0.001-0.006	0.3–2	30,000–180,000	candidate	2020
OGLE-2019-BLG-0551L	0.0242-0.3	7.69–95		Poorly characterized	2020
KMT-2019-BLG-2073L	0.19	59		candidate; distance needed	2020
VVV-2012-BLG-0472L	10.5	3,337	3,200		2022
MOA-9y-770L	0.07	22.3+42.2 −17.4	22,700		2023
MOA-9y-5919L	0.0012 or 0.0024	0.37+1.11 −0.27 or 0.75+1.23 −0.46	14,700 or 19,300		2023
KMT-2023-BLG-2669L	0.025–0.25	8–80		candidate; distance needed	2024
KMT-2024-BLG-0792L/OGLE-2024-BLG-0516L	0.219+0.075 −0.046	69.6+23.8 −14.6	3050+580 −430	candidate; planet could be either free-floating or on a very wide orbit	2026

=== Discovered via transit ===
Exoplanet	Mass (M_{J})	Age (Myr)	Distance (ly)	Spectral type	Status	Stellar assoc. membership	Discovery
J1407b	<6		<451		Candidate ALMA detection; although the object's brightness and proximity is consistent with it being the same object that eclipsed the star V1400 Centauri in 2007, follow-up observations by ALMA are needed to confirm whether it is moving, let alone in the right direction.	none	2012, 2020

== See also ==
- Capotauro – Y-type brown dwarf in the constellation Boötes
- Intergalactic star – Star not gravitationally bound to any galaxy
- Interstellar object – an astronomical object in interstellar space that is not gravitationally bound to a star
- ʻOumuamua – an interstellar object that passed through the Solar System in 2017
- Rogue black hole – a gravitationally unbound black hole
- Rogue extragalactic planets – rogue planets outside the Milky Way galaxy
- Tidally detached exomoon – rogue planets that were originally moons

=== In fiction ===
- A Pail of Air (1951) — a science fiction short story by Fritz Leiber where Earth is pulled out of the Solar System by a black hole. Although the Earth is explicitly stated to orbit the black hole, the net effect is the same as ejecting it out of the Solar System as a rogue planet.
- The Secret of the Ninth Planet (1959) — novel by Donald A. Wollheim in which Pluto is revealed to be a captured rogue planet with a surviving remnant civilization
- Space: 1999 (1975–77) — British science-fiction television programme where the Moon is ejected from the Solar System by a thermonuclear explosion
- "Rogue Planet" (2002) - an episode of Star Trek: Enterprise
- Metroid Prime 2: Echoes (2004) - video game set in a rogue planet, whose ecosystem is sustained by its natural energy, called by its inhabitants as "Light of Aether".
- Remina (2004–2005) – horror manga by Junji Ito featuring a sentient rogue planet capable of eating planets and stars
- Melancholia (2011) – science fiction film by Lars von Trier about a rogue planet on a collision course with Earth
- Dark Eden (2012) – a social science fiction novel by Chris Beckett
- The Wandering Earth (2019) – a science fiction film directed by Frant Gwo about Earth being artificially moved from the Solar System to the Alpha Centauri system
- Gemini Home Entertainment (2019–present) – horror anthology web series by Remy Abode, the main antagonist of which is a sentient rogue planet named "the Iris" that is masterminding an invasion of the Solar System, particularly Earth and Neptune
- Carol & the End of the World (2023) – an animated adult comedy miniseries by Dan Guterman

== Bibliography ==
- "Possibility of Life Sustaining Planets in Interstellar Space" Article by Stevenson similar to the Nature article but with more information.
