= WISE J2209+2711 =

Brown dwarf in the constellation Pegasus

WISE J220905.73+271143.9
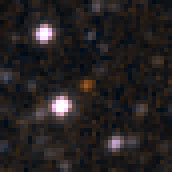
- WISE J2209+2711; Credit: unWISE

Observation data Epoch J2000 Equinox J2000
- Constellation: Pegasus
- Right ascension: 22^{h} 09^{m} 05.734^{s}
- Declination: +27° 11′ 44.00″

Characteristics
- Evolutionary stage: brown dwarf
- Spectral type: Y0

Astrometry
Proper motion (μ)	RA: +1204.40±2.14 mas/yr Dec.: −1362.08±1.34 mas/yr
Parallax (π)	161.7±2.0 mas
Distance	20.2 ± 0.2 ly (6.18 ± 0.08 pc)

Details
Mass	9±1 M_{Jup}
Radius	1.06±0.01 R_{Jup}
Luminosity	10^{−6.82±0.03} L_{☉}
Surface gravity (log g)	4.28±0.05 cgs
Temperature	350±3 K
Metallicity	$\begin{smallmatrix}\left[\ce{M}/\ce{H}\right]\end{smallmatrix}$ = 0.47±0.05
Age	2 Gyr

Other designations
- WISE J220905.73+271143.9

Database references
SIMBAD	data
- Location of WISE J2209+2711 in the constellation Pegasus

WISE J2209+2711 (WISE J220905.73+271143.9) is a brown dwarf of spectral type Y0:, located in constellation Pegasus at 22 light-years from Earth. Its discovery was published in 2014 by Cushing et al.

== Physical properties ==
WISE J2209+2711 is one of a few Y-dwarfs observed with the NIRSpec and MIRI instruments aboard the James Webb Space Telescope. The modelling re-produced the spectrum with an excellent fit using phosphine-free and diabatic models. The excellent fit was achieved with a model that used an effective temperature of 350 K (77 °C; 170 °F) and a surface gravity of 10^{4} cgs. This corresponds to a 5 M_{J} object with an age of 800 Myr. An atmospherical retrieval of WISE J2209+1711's spectral energy distribution, collected by JWST's NIRSpec and MIRI instruments, derive a mass of 9 M_{J}, a radius of 1.06 R_{J}, an effective temperature of 350 K (77 °C; 170 °F) and a surface gravity of 10^{4.28} cgs. The position of WISE J2209+2711 in the surface gravity-temperature diagram indicates an age close to two Gyr.

== See also ==
- List of star systems within 20–25 light years
- List of Y-dwarfs
