= Kevin Luhman =

American astronomer and astrophysicist

Kevin Luhman is an American astronomer and astrophysicist. He is a professor of astronomy and astrophysics at Pennsylvania State University.

Luhman discovered both the third-closest stellar system, Luhman 16, and the fourth-closest stellar system, WISE 0855−0714, to the Sun. Both systems are composed of substellar objects (objects less massive than stars), falling into the category of brown dwarfs (Luhman 16) or even less massive objects (WISE 0855−0714) which are categorized as sub-brown dwarfs but also referred to as "free floating planets" or "planetary mass objects". WISE 0855−0714 (discovery published 2014) is the coldest massive object outside the Solar System that has been directly imaged.

== Education ==
Luhman graduated from the University of Texas with a B.A. in astronomy and a B.S. in physics in 1993. He earned his Ph.D. in astronomy from the University of Arizona in 1998.

== Discoveries ==
Luhman 16 was named for its discoverer, following common practice for very nearby stars discovered in modern times.

These discoveries were made through analysis of mid-infrared data from the WISE satellite, a NASA mission that mapped the entire sky and detected several hundred million stars. The satellite mapped the entire sky twice between January 2010 and January 2011, thereby providing two sets of images and coordinates for every star. The motions of the nearest stars over the six-month interval between the two sets of observations were measurable, enabling the discovery of these new objects.
