= Y dwarf =

Brown dwarf or planet colder than 500 Kelvin

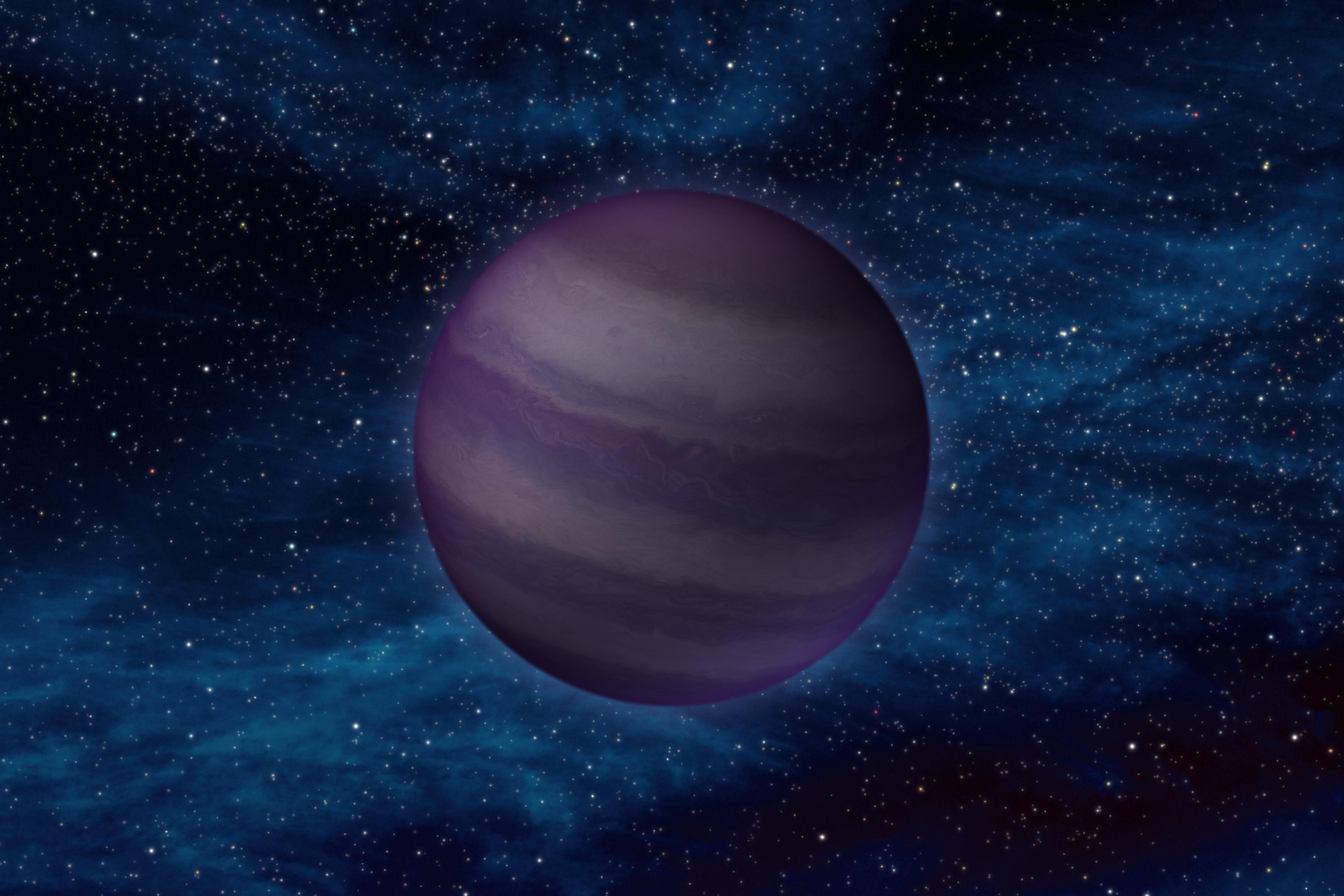
Artist's impression of a Y-type brown dwarf.

An object with a spectral type Y (also called Y dwarf) is either a brown dwarf or a free-floating planetary-mass object. They have temperatures below around 500 Kelvin (227°C; 440°F) and are colder than T-dwarfs. Y-dwarfs have a similar spectrum when compared to the giant planet Jupiter.

== Early theories and discovery ==
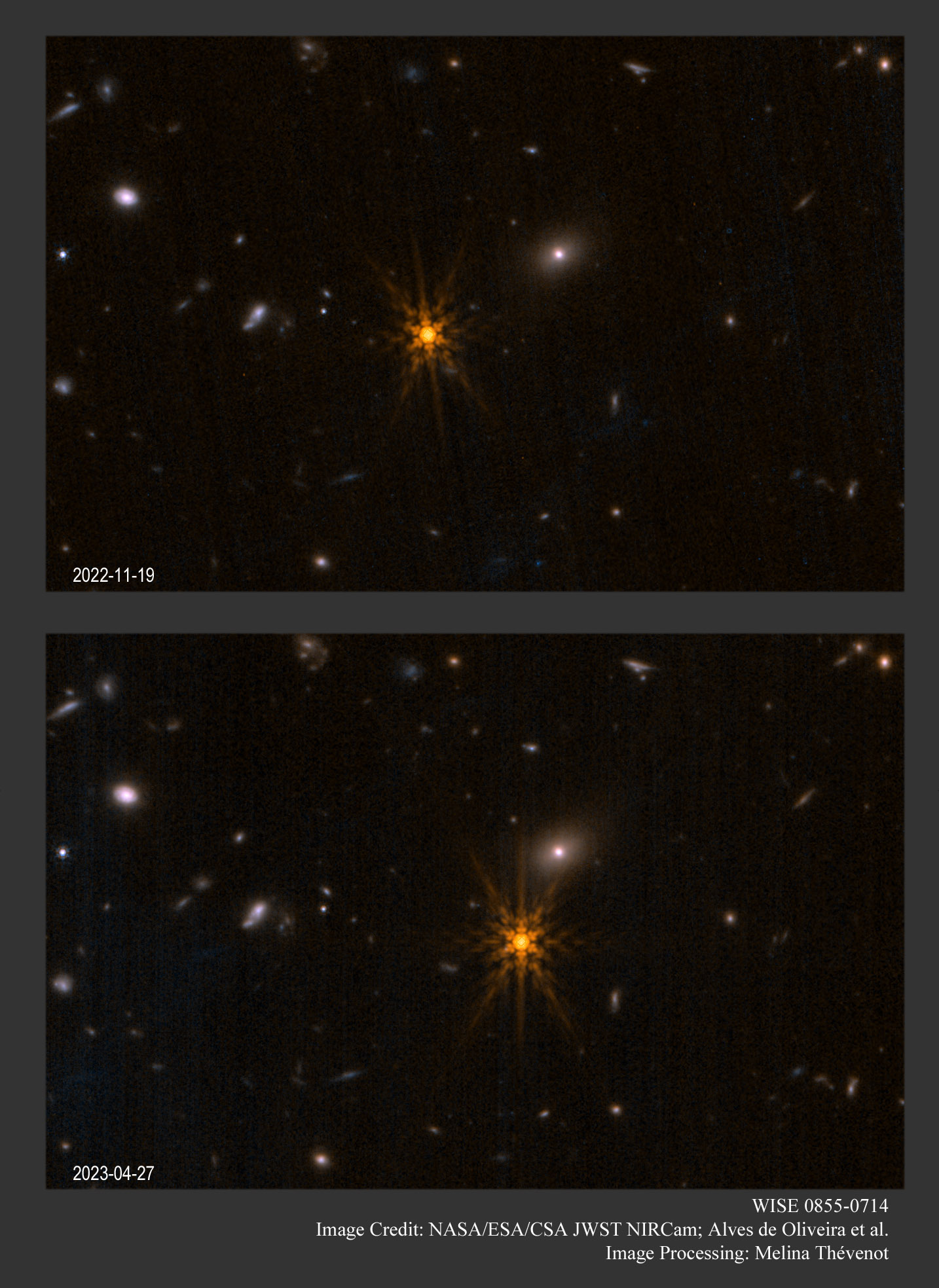
James Webb Space Telescope images, showing the movement of WISE 0855-0714, the coldest Y-dwarf

When the spectral classes of L dwarfs and T dwarfs were defined it was mentioned that the letter Y was available for an additional spectral class. In the early 2000s it was already theorized that objects "beyond the T dwarfs" should exist and that these objects would bridge the gap between T dwarfs and the giant planets of the Solar System. Objects colder than T dwarfs would primarily emit infrared as thermal radiation, so observations and discoveries with infrared telescopes such as WISE, Spitzer and James Webb Space Telescope were anticipated. Modelling of such cold objects predicted the disappearance of the sodium (Na D) and potassium (K I) features at around 500 K and the appearance of water clouds at around 400–500 K. Ammonia clouds were predicted to exist below around 160 K. The formation of these clouds were theorized earlier in the Sudarsky's gas giant classification.

After some candidates were proposed in 2010 and 2011, a larger sample of Y-dwarfs were discovered with WISE and the Y-dwarf spectral type was established, using UGPS 0722-05 as the T9 standard and WISE 1738+2732 as the Y0 standard. A significant discovery was the discovery of WISE 0855−0714, which remains the coldest and closest Y-dwarf discovered. It has a temperature of 285 K (12 °C; 53 °F) and has the latest spectral type of Y4.

== The Y-class ==
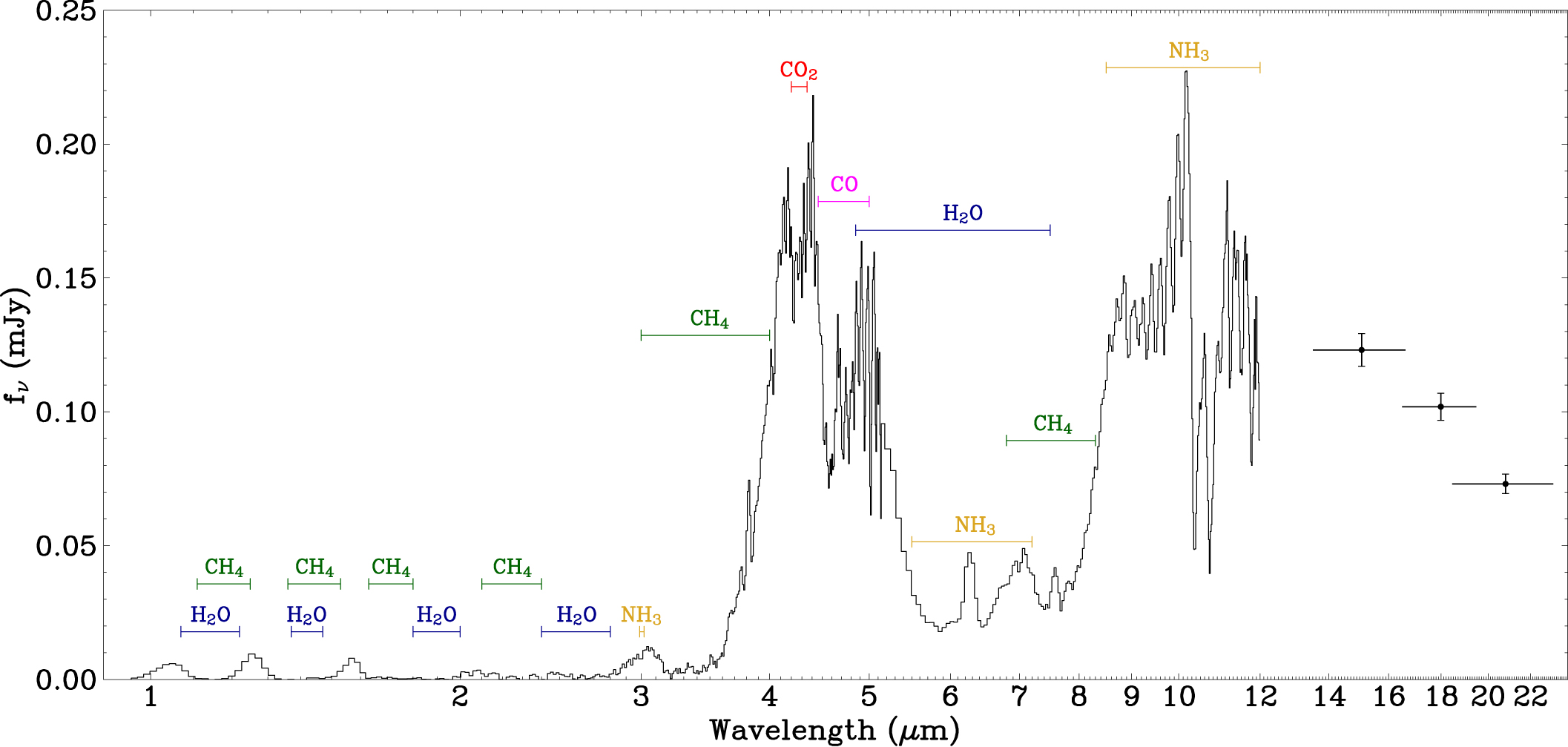
Spectrum of WISE 0359−5401 with JWST, showing different molecular absorption bands.

A Y-dwarf is characterized by its deep methane (CH_{4}) and water vapor (H_{2}O) bands, as well as a narrower J-band peak than the T9 standard. The J-band peak will get narrower with a spectral type later than T8. Early observations also showed evidence of ammonia (NH_{3}) in the near-infrared spectrum. Modern observations with JWST detect CH_{4}, H_{2}O, NH_{3}, carbon monoxide (CO) and carbon dioxide (CO_{2}) in the atmosphere of Y-dwarfs. Phosphine (PH_{3}) was missing from the atmosphere, despite being predicted to be present. Later observations found low amounts of phosphine in WISE 0855−0714. JWST observations showed that models under-predict the abundance of CO_{2} and over-predict PH_{3} for late T and Y dwarfs. Proposed explanations for the missing PH_{3} are that it condenses into clouds of ammonium dihydrogen phosphate (NH_{4}H_{2}PO_{4}), an incomplete understanding of phosphorus chemistry or a different mixing of the atmosphere. Another work suggests the formation of metal phosphide in most brown dwarfs, depleting phosphine in the atmosphere. The formation of phosphide occurs only in brown dwarfs with high enough metallicity. The overabundance of CO_{2} is explained with a better understanding of the CO_{2} chemistry in respect to CO chemistry. CH_{4}, H_{2}O and NH_{3} absorption features get deeper with lower temperature. The 5 μm peak does not show such a correlation and instead shows a large diversity. This region is influenced by multiple molecules, including CO and CO_{2}, which vary a lot between sources. The reason for this variation could be due to a different surface gravity or due to differences in metallicity. CO_{2} was noted to slightly decrease from T dwarfs to Y dwarfs, but not CO. Hydrogen sulfide (H_{2}S) is used to improve the spectral fits of T- and Y-dwarfs. Currently the only Y-dwarfs with detected H_{2}S are WISE 1828+26 and WISE 0359−5401. Some isotopes were found in WISE 0855−0714. One study found deuterated methane (CH_{3}D) and another study found ^{15}NH_{3}.

=== Colder lower atmosphere ===
Usually brown dwarfs have a pressure–temperature (P–T) profile in an adiabatic form, which means that the pressure and temperature increase with depth. JWST spectroscopy and photometry suggest that Y-dwarfs have P–T profiles that are not in the standard adiabatic form. This means that upper layers of the atmosphere have a warmer temperature and lower layers of the atmosphere have a colder temperature. This is explained by the rapid rotation of these isolated objects. The rapid rotation leads to dynamical, thermal, and chemical changes, which disrupt the convective transport of heat from the lower to the upper atmosphere. This different P–T profile influences the shape of the spectrum and influences the composition of carbon- and nitrogen-bearing molecules in the atmospheres of Y-dwarfs.

=== Clouds and variability ===
Water clouds were theorized since the early 2000s to exist in Y-dwarfs. The Y-dwarfs do however likely also have clouds made of other condensates, such as sulfides, potassium chloride (KCl) and possibly ammonium dihydrogen phosphate (NH_{4}H_{2}PO_{4}). These clouds would exist below any water clouds for colder Y-dwarfs. Some Y-dwarfs are likely too warm to form water clouds, but could have other observable clouds. The first discovered variable Y-dwarf was WISE 1405+5534 (Y0) and its variability is modelled with a single bright spot. Another variable Y dwarf is WISE 1738+2732 (Y0) and its variability is explained with the breakup of KCl and sodium sulfide (Na_{2}S) clouds into a patchy cloud cover. A variability study with Spitzer found that 35% to 75% of Y-dwarfs are variable. This variability likely comes from variations in vertical and horizontal structure of clouds. WISE 0855−0714 (Y4) was suspected to have water ice clouds, but a later study with MIRI did not detect any water ice clouds. A study using the NIRCam photometry of WISE J0336−0143 B found a significantly bluer color when compared to WISE 0855−0714, suggesting the presence of water ice clouds in this Y-dwarf.

=== Peculiar Y-dwarfs ===
Aurora in CWISEP J1935-1546 detected by its methane emission

Currently only the suffix pec, standing for "peculiar" or unusual, exists for Y-dwarfs. Any spectral peculiarity is denoted this way, such as the Y-band peak and Y-J color of WISE 1639−6847 (Y0pec), which is different from other Y-dwarfs. In some cases the peculiarity is explained with a non-solar metallicity or an unusual surface gravity. An example is CWISE J1055+5443, for which researchers find that low gravity models fit the spectrum better, likely due to a young age. JWST observations found two Y-dwarfs with unusual spectral features of the carbon-bearing molecules. CWISEP J1047+54 showed abnormally strong CO and CO_{2} and likely weaker CH_{4}. Similar strong CO and CO_{2} absorption features were found in WISE J1206+8401. WISE J0535−75 on the other hand showed no discernable CO_{2} and almost undetectable CO, but it also showed stronger NH_{3} absorption when compared to Y-dwarfs with similar temperature. Another notable spectral discovery with JWST is the emission of methane in CWISEP J1935-1546, which is interpreted with the presence of an aurora. One of the first suspected Y-type subdwarfs is WISEA J1534−1043, which shows an unusual blue color. This was confirmed with JWST, which also included the first detection of silane in a substellar object.

== Exoplanets and companions ==
Masses estimated for Y-dwarfs are between 3–29 M_{J}, but more typically below 21 M_{J}. This makes them similar to massive exoplanets.

There is only one confirmed Y-dwarf that co-moves with a white dwarf, called WD 0806−661 B or Ahra. Though of planetary mass, Rodriguez et al. suggest it is unlikely to have formed in the same manner as planets. Additionally there is the T/Y companion Ross 19B, which orbits a main-sequence star. A small sample of (candidate) exoplanets exist with a temperature below 500 K, which could be spectroscopically confirmed as Y-dwarfs in the future. These exoplanets are Epsilon Indi Ab (275 K), GALEX J071816.4+373139 b (400 K), WD 0310–688 b (248+84
−61 K), and 14 Herculis c (275 K). Two candidates around white dwarfs turned out to be false-positives.

== Binaries ==
Binaries consisting of a late T dwarf primary and a Y dwarf secondary are known since the discovery of CFBDS J1458+10 during the early discovery of Y-dwarfs. Other such binaries are WISEPC J1217+1626 and WISE J0146+4234. Two Y+Y binaries were discovered with JWST: WISE J0336−0143 and CWISEP J1935−1546.

== Searches for Magnetism ==
In 2010-2011, astronomers first used Arecibo Observatory to search for auroral radio emission from the Y dwarf companions of two solar-like stars, HD 38529A and HD 106252. They hypothesized that the transfer of kinetic or magnetic energy from impinging stellar winds on the brown dwarf magnetospheres would cause radio emission similar to the decametric radiation at Jupiter. The measurement of radio emission would have allowed for a direct measurement of the magnetic field strengths of the brown dwarfs. However, no radio emission was detected, and at this time, the magnetic field strengths of Y dwarfs remain unknown.

== Individual discoveries ==
Timeline of Y-dwarf discoveries:

- April 2010: Two newly discovered ultracool sub-brown dwarfs (UGPS 0722-05 and SDWFS 1433+35) were proposed as prototypes for spectral class Y0.
- February 2011: Luhman et al. reported the discovery of WD 0806−661 B, a brown dwarf companion to a nearby white dwarf, with a temperature of c. 300 K (27 °C; 80 °F) and mass of 7 M_{J}.
- February 2011: Shortly after that, Liu et al. published an account of a "very cold" (c. 370 K (97 °C; 206 °F)) brown dwarf orbiting another very-low-mass brown dwarf and noted, "Given its low luminosity, atypical colors and cold temperature, CFBDS J1458+10B is a promising candidate for the hypothesized Y spectral class."
- August 2011: Scientists using data from NASA's Wide-field Infrared Survey Explorer (WISE) discovered six objects that they classified as Y dwarfs with temperatures as cool as 25 °C (298 K; 77 °F). These were published in two papers.
- July 2012: Seven new Y-dwarfs were discovered, making the total number of confirmed Y-dwarfs fourteen. One of the Y dwarfs, called WISE 1828+2650, was, as of August 2011, the record holder for the coldest brown dwarf—emitting no visible light at all, this type of object resembles a free-floating planet more than a star. WISE 1828+2650 was initially estimated to have an atmospheric temperature cooler than 300 K (27 °C; 80 °F). Its temperature has since been revised, and newer estimates put it in the range of 250 to 400 K (−23 to 127 °C; −10 to 260 °F).
- November 2012: WISE J1639−6847 was discovered. As of February 2024, it was the second-closest known Y-dwarf to Earth.
- April 2014: WISE 0855−0714 was announced, with a temperature profile estimated around 225 to 260 K (−48 – −13 °C; −55–8 °F) and a mass of 3 to 10 M_{J}. It was also unusual in that its observed parallax meant a distance close to 7.2 ± 0.7 light-years from the Solar System.
- May 2014: The Y-dwarf WISE J2209+2711 was published.
- November 2014: The object WISEA J1141−3326 was estimated to be a Y-dwarf and it was later confirmed.
- April 2015: The T+Y dwarf binary WISE J0146+4234 AB was discovered.
- May 2015: Three Y-dwarfs were discovered with Hubble, bringing the total number of confirmed Y-dwarfs to 21.
- June 2018: WISEA J0302−5817 was published as a Y-dwarf, and WISEA J1141−3326 was confirmed as a Y-dwarf.
- August 2019: A search of the CatWISE catalog revealed CWISEP J1935-1546, one of the coldest brown dwarfs with an estimated temperature of 270 to 360 K (−3–87 °C; 26–188 °F). In 2023 it was announced that CWISEP J1935-1546 had methane emission potentially due to aurora.
- January 2020: In January 2020 the discovery of WISE J0830+2837, initially discovered by citizen scientists of the Backyard Worlds project, was presented at the 235th meeting of the American Astronomical Society. This Y dwarf is 36.5 light-years distant from the Solar System and has a temperature of about 350 K (77 °C; 170 °F).
- February 2020: The CatWISE catalog combined NASA's WISE and NEOWISE surveys. It expanded the number of faint sources and has therefore been used to find the faintest brown dwarfs, including Y dwarfs. Seventeen candidate Y dwarfs were discovered by the CatWISE researchers. Initial color with the Spitzer Space Telescope indicated that CW1446 is one of the reddest and coldest Y dwarfs. Additional data with Spitzer showed that CW1446 is the fifth-reddest brown dwarf, with a temperature of about 310 to 360 K (37–87 °C; 98–188 °F) and a distance of about 10 parsecs.
- August 2020: Five candidate Y-dwarfs were discovered via the Backyard Worlds project.
- April 2021: New Y-dwarf candidates were published by the CatWISE and Backyard Worlds teams in a collaborative paper.
- August 2021: Ross 19B, an old object near the T/Y-boundary orbiting an M-dwarf, was discovered by the Backyard Worlds team.
- April 2023: WISE J0336−0143 was confirmed as a Y-dwarf binary with JWST. The B secondary is likely one of the coldest confirmed Y-dwarfs as of December 2023, with an estimated temperature of 246 to 404 K (−27–131 °C; −17–268 °F).
- November 2023: CWISE J1055+5443, an object previously classified as a T-dwarf, was confirmed as a nearby Y-dwarf.
- December 2023: Three new Y-dwarf candidates were published. The total number of confirmed Y-dwarfs was 27, and 30 additional Y-dwarf candidates existed as of February 2024.
- August 2026: Capotauro, which was initially thought to be a z=32 Lyman-break galaxy, is identified as a Y-dwarf.
