= WISE 1534−1043 =

Brown dwarf in the constellation Libra

- "The Accident" brown dwarf in motion (WISE; Credit: NASA/JPL-Caltech/Dan Caselden

Observation data Epoch J2000.0 Equinox ICRS
- Constellation: Libra
- Right ascension: 15^{h} 34^{m} 29.02178^{s}
- Declination: −10° 43′ 24.8841″

Characteristics
- Spectral type: sdY?

Astrometry
| Radial velocity (R_{v}) | −116±4 km/s |
| Total velocity | 238±14 km/s |
| Proper motion (μ) | RA: −1253.1±8.9 mas/yr Dec.: −2377.0±7.0 mas/yr |
| Parallax (π) | 61.4±4.7 mas |
| Distance | 53 ± 4 ly (16 ± 1 pc) |

Details
| Mass | 19–30 M_{Jup} |
| Radius | 0.79+0.07 −0.06 R_{Jup} |
| Luminosity | 2.27×10^{−7} L_{☉} |
| Luminosity (bolometric) | 3.72×10^{−7} L_{☉} |
| Surface gravity (log g) | 4.98±0.08 cgs |
| Temperature | 502±6 K |
| Metallicity | −2.22±0.05 |
| Metallicity [Fe/H] | >−2.0 dex |

Other designations
- CWISE J153429.19−104318.9, WISEA J153429.75−104303.3

Database references
| SIMBAD | data |

WISE 1534−1043 (or WISEA J153429.75−104303.3, and referred to as "The Accident") is a brown dwarf (substellar object), Class Y, the coolest class, visible only in the infrared. It was accidentally discovered via the Wide-field Infrared Survey Explorer.

The brown dwarf is 50 light years from Earth, with a transverse velocity of over 200 km/s – over 25% faster than the next fastest stellar object of its kind. Its relative color components are unique among brown dwarfs observed to date. The best guess as to its origins are that it is a very old and low-metallicity object. On the 245th meeting of the AAS it was announced that JWST confirmed the object as a brown dwarf.

== Discovery ==
WISE 1534−1043 was first noticed by Dan Caselden, a security engineer and citizen scientist of the Backyard Worlds Zooniverse project. He built his own online program to find brown dwarfs and found this source by accident, while looking at another source. It was first announced as a brown dwarf by the CatWISE team, who used Spitzer Space Telescope for follow-up observations. It had the highest proper motion in this sample and was undetected in Palomar/WIRC. This already hinted at the subdwarf nature of this object. Subsequent observations with the Hubble Space Telescope WFC3 and Keck MOSFIRE uncovered the faintness of the source in the J-band. By combining Spitzer and Hubble data, a robust parallax was measured, establishing it as a possible subdwarf of type Y.

== Properties ==
The parallax measurement for WISE 1534−1043 showed a distance of 16 parsecs, resulting in a faint absolute ch2 magnitude and therefore a low temperature. New spectroscopic models for metal-poor brown dwarfs, resulted in a temperature lower than 500 K (<227 °C), making WISE 1534−1043 a Y-dwarf.

The moderate red Spitzer ch1–ch2 color for WISE 1534−1043 is likely caused by methane in the atmosphere. Methane absorbs around the wavelength of 3.6 μm, corresponding to the W1 (WISE) and ch1 (Spitzer) bands, causing a red color for T and Y-dwarfs. Other late T- and Y-dwarfs show a much redder ch1–ch2 color when compared to WISE 1534−1043. The low amount of carbon in WISE 1534–1043 causes the atmosphere to contain less methane and explains the moderate red ch1–ch2 color.

The red J–W2 color is caused by a faint J-band magnitude. A likely cause for the faint J-band in metal-poor T/Y-dwarfs is collision-induced absorption of hydrogen molecules, which is enhanced in metal-poor brown dwarfs and broadly absorbs in the near-infrared. Additional evidence hint to a peculiar Y/J-band spectrum for WISE 1534−1043.

The metal-poor scenario fits with the high tangential velocity of about 200 km/s. Metal-poor objects belong to older stellar population, which are in a different orbit around the galactic center compared to the sun. WISE 1534−1043 has such a high velocity that it is suggested to be a halo member.

A pre-print paper from January 2023 describes the first J-band magnitude measurement of WISE 1534−1043, taken with Flamingos-2 at Gemini South. The previous J-band magnitude was estimated from a Hubble F110W measurement.

Based on the model tracks and associated iso-temperature the most consistent temperature is between about 400 K and 550 K, while the most consistent metallicity is $[M/H]\lesssim-0.5dex$. The metallicity could be significantly lower and especially the extreme red J–W2 color suggests it could be cold even for a Y-dwarf. The researchers are not able to determine the Y-dwarf status of WISE 1534−1043 with absolute certainty, due to the T/Y-dwarf transition occurring at about 485 K. The researchers suggest that JWST spectroscopy is needed to determine the detailed physical properties of this object. JWST observations were approved for cylcle 2 with NIRSpec and MIRI.

In 2025 researchers made the first detection of silane (SiH_{4}) in the atmosphere of a substellar object. The spectrum revealed methane, water vapour and silane in the atmosphere. The presence of silane is explained with a reducing atmosphere at low metallicities, favouring the formation of hydrides, such as silane. The higher gravity compared with Jupiter also reduces the time scale for vertical mixing. This way silane can be mixed upwards from deeper layers at which silicon-bearing gases did not react into silicate clouds.

WISE 1534−1043 has the bluest F110W-J color available for late T and Y-dwarfs.

Photometry of WISE 1534–1043
| Telescope | Band or Filter | Wavelength (μm) | Brightness (Vega magnitude) | Reference |
|---|---|---|---|---|
| HST | F110W | 1.10 | 24.695 ± 0.083 | |
| WISE | W1 | 3.5 | 18.182 ± 0.189 | |
| WISE | W2 | 4.6 | 16.145 ± 0.084 | |
| Spitzer | ch1 | 3.6 | 16.691 ± 0.032 | |
| Spitzer | ch2 | 4.5 | 15.766 ± 0.023 | |
| Gemini | J | 1.25 | 24.5 ± 0.3 | |
| DECam | Y | 0.99 | >21.79 | |

== Disproven alternative explanations ==
Previous alternative explanations included an extremely low-mass and young brown dwarf. This scenario cannot explain the high velocity, as young objects usually show a low tangential velocity.

Another alternative was an ejected exoplanet. Even for a young and recently ejected exoplanet, models predicted a mass of about 0.3 M_{J}. Microlensing surveys have shown that ejected exoplanets with such high masses are extremely rare and it is unlikely to find any in the neighbourhood of the Sun.

An ultra-cold stellar remnant cannot fully explain the colors of WISE 1534−1043. It would also require a white dwarf that is older than the Milky Way or an exotic scenario in which the white dwarf got stripped to its bare core by a source and then ripped from its ablating source. Finding such a source near the Sun is highly improbable.

All these explanations were disproven after JWST observations in 2025, which confirmed it as a metal-poor brown dwarf.

== See also ==
- List of star systems within 50–55 light-years
- List of Y-dwarfs
