= WISE 0855−0714 =

Brown dwarf in the constellation Hydra

WISE J085510.83−071442.5
- Time-lapsed photo sequence of WISE 0855−0714's movement in the sky using captured images in the near infrared from the JWST

Observation data Epoch J2000 Equinox ICRS
- Constellation: Hydra
- Right ascension: 08^{h} 55^{m} 10.83168^{s}
- Declination: −07° 14′ 42.5256″

Characteristics
- Spectral type: Y4V
- Apparent magnitude (J): 25.00±0.53
- Apparent magnitude (H): 23.83±0.24

Astrometry
Proper motion (μ)	RA: −8,123.7±1.3 mas/yr Dec.: 673.2±1.3 mas/yr
Parallax (π)	439.0±2.4 mas
Distance	7.43 ± 0.04 ly (2.28 ± 0.01 pc)

Details
Mass	~3–10, 3.44, 4.33, ≤12 M_{Jup}
Radius	0.1074 ± 0.0074 (Note: Calculated, using the Stefan-Boltzmann law and the star's effective temperature and luminosity, with respect to the solar nominal effective temperature of 5,772 K: $$\sqrt{\biggl(\frac{5,772}{276}\biggr)^4 \cdot 10^{-7.22}} = 0.1074\ R_\odot.$$ One $R_\odot$ = 9.7311 R_{J}, so 9.7311 • 0.1074 = 1.045 R_{J}.) R_{☉}
Radius	1.045±0.072 R_{Jup}
Luminosity	6.03+0.28 −0.27×10^{−8} L_{☉}
Surface gravity (log g)	3.93±0.05 or 4.03±0.07 cgs
Temperature	276±9 K
Metallicity [Fe/H]	~0 dex
Age	1–10 (assumed) Gyr

Other designations
- WISEA J085510.74-071442.5, GJ 11286

Database references
SIMBAD	data
- Location of WISE 0855−0714 in the constellation Hydra

WISE 0855−0714 (full designation WISE J085510.83−071442.5, or W0855 for short) is a brown dwarf of spectral class Y4, located 7.4 light-years (2.3 parsecs) from the Sun in the constellation Hydra. It is the fourth-closest stellar or substellar system to the Sun and was discovered by Kevin Luhman in 2013 using data from the Wide-field Infrared Survey Explorer (WISE). It is the coldest brown dwarf found yet, having a temperature of about 276 K (3 °C; 37 °F). It has an estimated mass between 3 and 10 Jupiter masses, which makes it a planetary-mass object below the 13-Jupiter-mass rough limit for deuterium fusion.

== Discovery ==
WISE 0855−0714 was first imaged by the WISE telescope on 4 May 2010 during its primary mission of surveying the entire sky. It was later discovered by Kevin Luhman in March 2013, who noticed the object's unusually high proper motion while searching for potential binary companions of the Sun in WISE images. In the interest of confirming the object's spectral properties and nearby distance to the Sun, Luhman made follow-up observations with the Spitzer Space Telescope and the Gemini North telescope in 2013–2014. The discovery of the object was announced in a NASA press release in April 2014.

== Distance and proper motion ==
Based on direct observations, WISE 0855−0714 has a large parallax of 439.0±2.4 mas, which corresponds to a distance of around 2.28±0.01 parsecs (7.43±0.04 light-years). This makes WISE 0855−0714 the fourth-closest stellar or substellar system to the Sun. WISE 0855−0714 also has an exceptionally high proper motion of 8,151.6±1.8 mas/yr, the third highest after Barnard's Star (10,300 mas/yr) and Kapteyn's Star (8,600 mas/yr).

== Physical characteristics ==
=== Mass and age ===
The mass and age of WISE 0855−0714 are neither known with certainty, but can be constrained with its known present-day temperature. The age of WISE 0855−0714 depends on its mass; a lower mass would lead to a faster rate of cooling and thus a younger age for WISE 0855−0714, whereas a higher mass would lead to a slower rate of cooling and thus an older age for WISE 0855−0714. Assuming an age range of 1–10 billion years, evolutionary models for brown dwarfs predict that WISE 0855−0714 should have a mass between 3 and 10 M_{Jup}. The mass could also be obtained with measurements of the surface gravity and radius of the brown dwarf. One 2024 study obtained two values of 10^{3.93} and 10^{4.03} cgs for the surface gravity from two different data sets. Assuming a radius of one Jupiter radius (R_{Jup}) for the brown dwarf, they obtained mass values of 3.44 and 4.33 M_{Jup}, respectively. All these mass values are in the planetary mass range.

=== Classification ===
As of 2003, the International Astronomical Union considers an object with a mass above 13 M_{Jup}, capable of fusing deuterium, to be a brown dwarf. WISE 0855–0714, being a free-floating object with a mass lower than the deuterium burning limit, would be called a free-floating planetary mass object, although the literature classifies it as a brown dwarf. If the distinction is based on how the object formed then it might be considered a failed star, a theory advanced for the object Cha 110913−773444.

=== Temperature, size and luminosity ===
WISE 0855–0714 is the coldest-known brown dwarf, with an effective temperature of 276 K (3 °C; 37 °F), as estimated from evolutionary models based on its bolometric luminosity of 6.03×10^{−8} L_{☉} and an assumed age between 0.5 and 10 billion years. The luminosity and temperature imply a radius of 0.107 solar radii (R_{☉}), or 1.045 R_{Jup}. Atmospheric models matching the NIRSpec spectrum are well fitted with a temperature of 285 K (12 °C; 53 °F), somewhat higher than that estimated from evolution models.

Since WISE 0855−0714 is an isolated object, its luminosity primarily comes from thermal radiation. WISE 0855−0714's temperature is low enough that it roughly matches room temperature, which means its luminosity is very low and it primarily emits infrared radiation as thermal radiation. Hence, it is best observed with infrared telescopes such as WISE and the James Webb Space Telescope (JWST). WISE 0855−0714 has been detected in spectral wavelengths as short as 1.15 μm—in this near-infrared wavelength, the object appears extremely dim with an apparent magnitude of 26.3. WISE 0855−0714's brightness decreases with decreasing wavelength, so the object is practically invisible in visible light.

== Spectrometry ==
Its luminosity in different bands of the thermal infrared in combination with its absolute magnitude—because of its known distance—was used to place it in context of different models; the best characterization of its brightness was in the W2 band of 4.6 μm at an apparent magnitude of 13.89±0.05, though it was brighter into the deeper infrared. Infrared images taken with the Magellan Baade Telescope suggest evidence of sulfide clouds below water ice clouds.

Near- and mid-infrared spectra in the L and M bands were taken with the GNIRS instrument on the Gemini North Telescope. The M-band (4.5–5.1 μm) spectrum is dominated by water vapour (H_{2}O) absorption. The L-band (3.4–4.14 μm) spectrum is dominated by methane absorption. Both the M and L band surprisingly have no detection of phosphine (PH_{3}), which appears in the atmosphere of Jupiter. The M-band spectrum shows evidence for water ice clouds and the near-infrared photometry WISE 0855 is faint compared to models, suggesting an additional absorber, probably clouds made of ammonium dihydrogen phosphate (NH_{4})(H_{2}PO_{4}), which are below the water ice clouds. An approved JWST proposal describes how the team is planning to use a near-infrared time-series to study the hydrological cycle in the atmosphere of WISE 0855 with NIRSpec.

Observations with NIRSpec detected methane (CH_{4}), water vapour (H_{2}O), ammonia (NH_{3}) and carbon monoxide (CO) in the atmosphere, but was not able to confirm any phosphine (PH_{3}) or carbon dioxide (CO_{2}) in the atmosphere. Water ice clouds are also not confirmed and the spectrum is well matched with a cloudless model. Observations with MIRI showed a water vapour depletion and a water abundance that is variable with pressure. This is consistent with water condensing out in the upper atmosphere. The observations did however not detect any water ice clouds, which were predicted in previous studies. This discrepancy is explained with the rainout of the water: Water condenses into particles in the upper atmosphere, which quickly sink into the lower atmosphere. Clouds only form if upward mixing is present. A similar process is present for alkali metals in L and T dwarfs. A direct rainout would suggest weak mixing, but disequilibrium chemistry suggest rigorous mixing. Future variable studies might resolve if upward mixing or settling is the dominant process. Cloud models, however, potentially detected deep ammonium dihydrogen phosphate (NH_{4})(H_{2}PO_{4}) clouds. The observations also detected ^{15}NH_{3} for the first time in WISE 0855. The atmosphere has a mass fraction of ^{14}NH_{3}/^{15}NH_{3} = 332+63
−43, meaning it has about 99.7% ^{14}N and about 0.3% ^{15}N. Compared to solar values and the ratio of WISE 1828, the atmosphere of WISE 0855 is enriched in ^{15}N. The nitrogen isotope ratio is closer to today's ^{15}N-enriched interstellar medium. This could mean that WISE 0855 formed from a younger cloud, but more measurements of ^{15}N in other brown dwarfs are needed to establish evolutionary trends. In November 2024 a team used archived and new NIRSpec data to detect deuterated methane (CH_{3}D) and about one part per billion PH_{3} in WISE 0855. This detection of deuterium showed that WISE 0855 has a mass below the deuterium-burning limit. The low amount of PH_{3} is, on the other hand, in disagreement with predictions, showing incomplete knowledge of phosphorus chemistry. In September 2026 a team used NIRSpec time-series to detect patchy water ice clouds within WISE 0855. This is based on a better fit to the spectrum and to explain some of the variation. Based on the variation the researchers determine an edge-on orientation.

== Variability ==
Variability of WISE 0855 in the infrared was measured with Spitzer IRAC. A relative small amplitude of 4–5% was measured. Water ice cloud models predicted a large amplitude. This small amplitude might suggest that the hemispheres of WISE 0855 have very small deviation in cloud coverage. The light curve is too irregular to produce a good fit and rotation periods between 9.7 and 14 hours were measured. JWST NIRSpec time-series showed variable carbonmonoxide and phosphine emission. The CO absorption is variable up to 10% at some wavelengths. Both variations are correlate with each other and are mainly explained with deep temperature modulations in the convective zone. The rest of the variations are explained with patchy water ice clouds at lower pressures (higher altitudes).

== Search for satellites ==
A team of researchers used 11 hours of JWST observations to search for transits caused by exomoons around WISE 0855. The researchers did not find any transits. By injecting transits into the light curve, the researchers found that they could have detected ≥0.5% deep transits with a detection rate of 96%. This transit depth would be seen for an object about twice as large as Saturn's moon Titan.

== Gallery ==
Time-lapsed photo sequence of WISE 0855−0714's movement in the sky using captured images from the WISE and the Spitzer telescopes

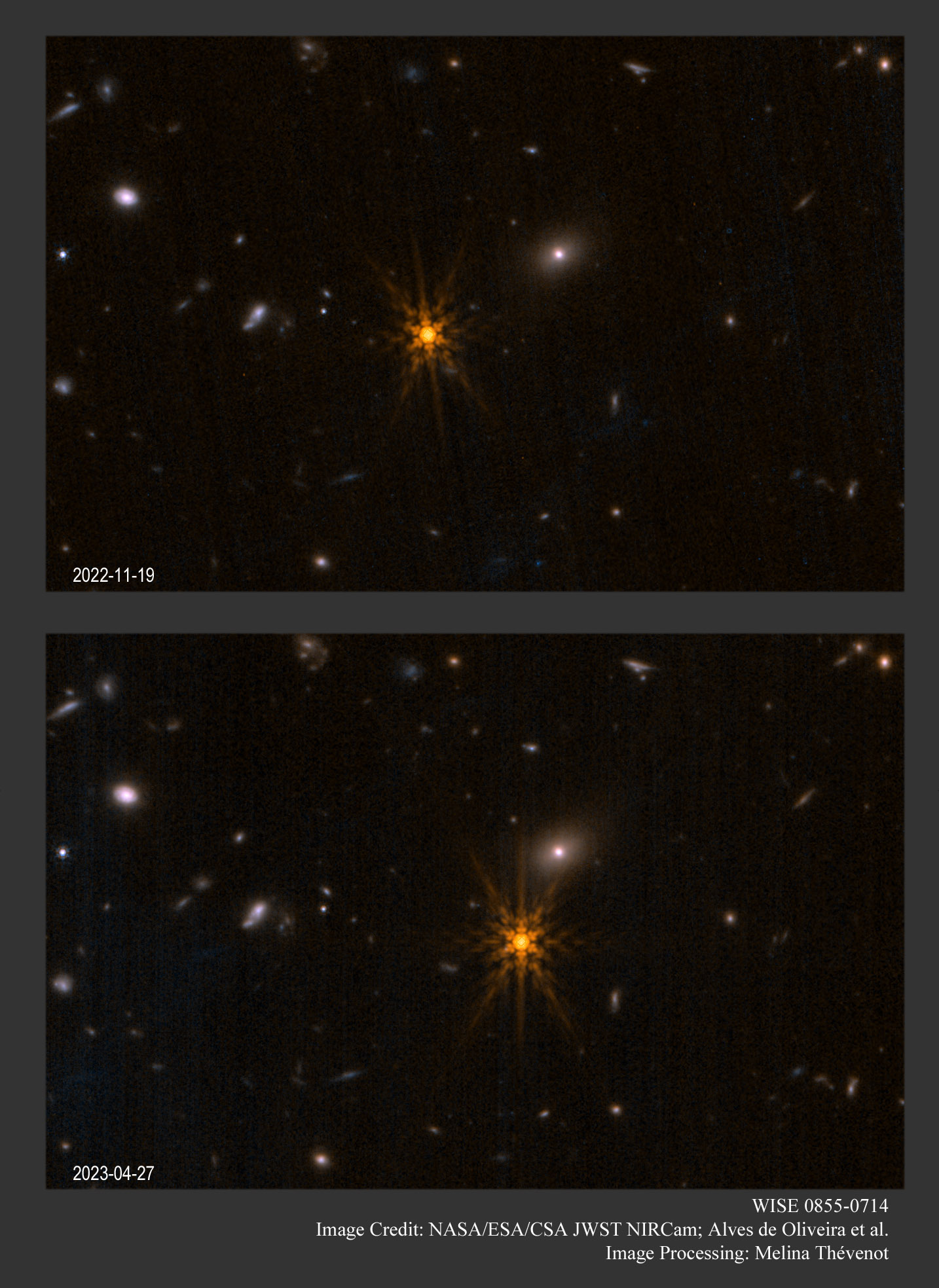
JWST NIRCam observation of W0855 (orange "star" at the center) showing the movement over about half a year

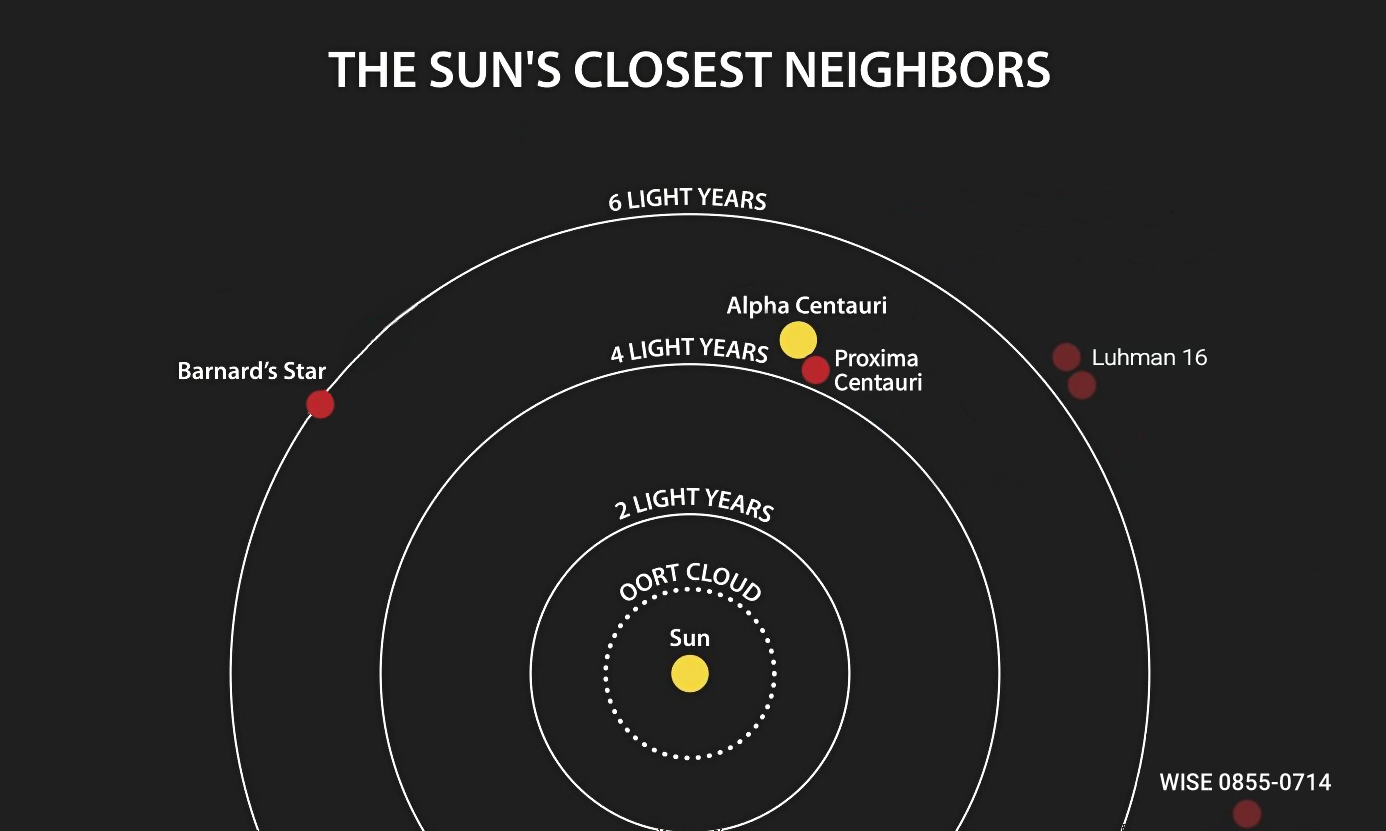
Diagram of the closest stars to the Sun within 7.5 ly

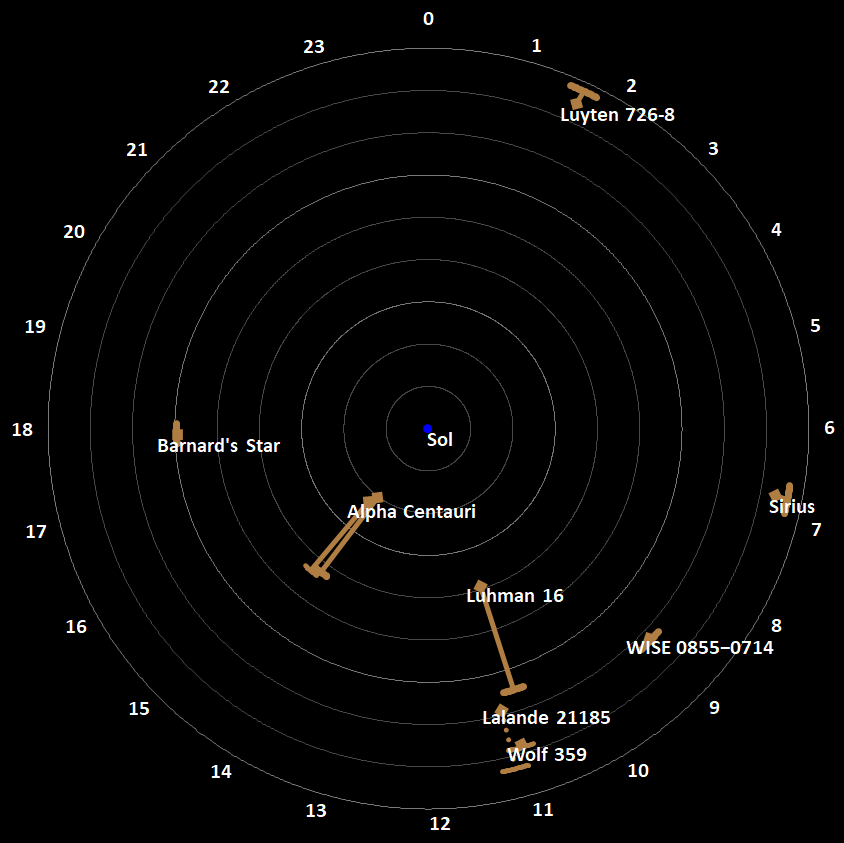
The position of WISE 0855−0714 on a radar map among all stellar objects or stellar systems within 9 light-years (ly) from the map's center, the Sun (Sol). The diamond shapes are their positions entered according to right ascension in hours angle (indicated at the edge of the map's reference disc), and according to their declination. The second mark shows each's distance from Sol, with the concentric circles indicating the distance in steps of one ly.

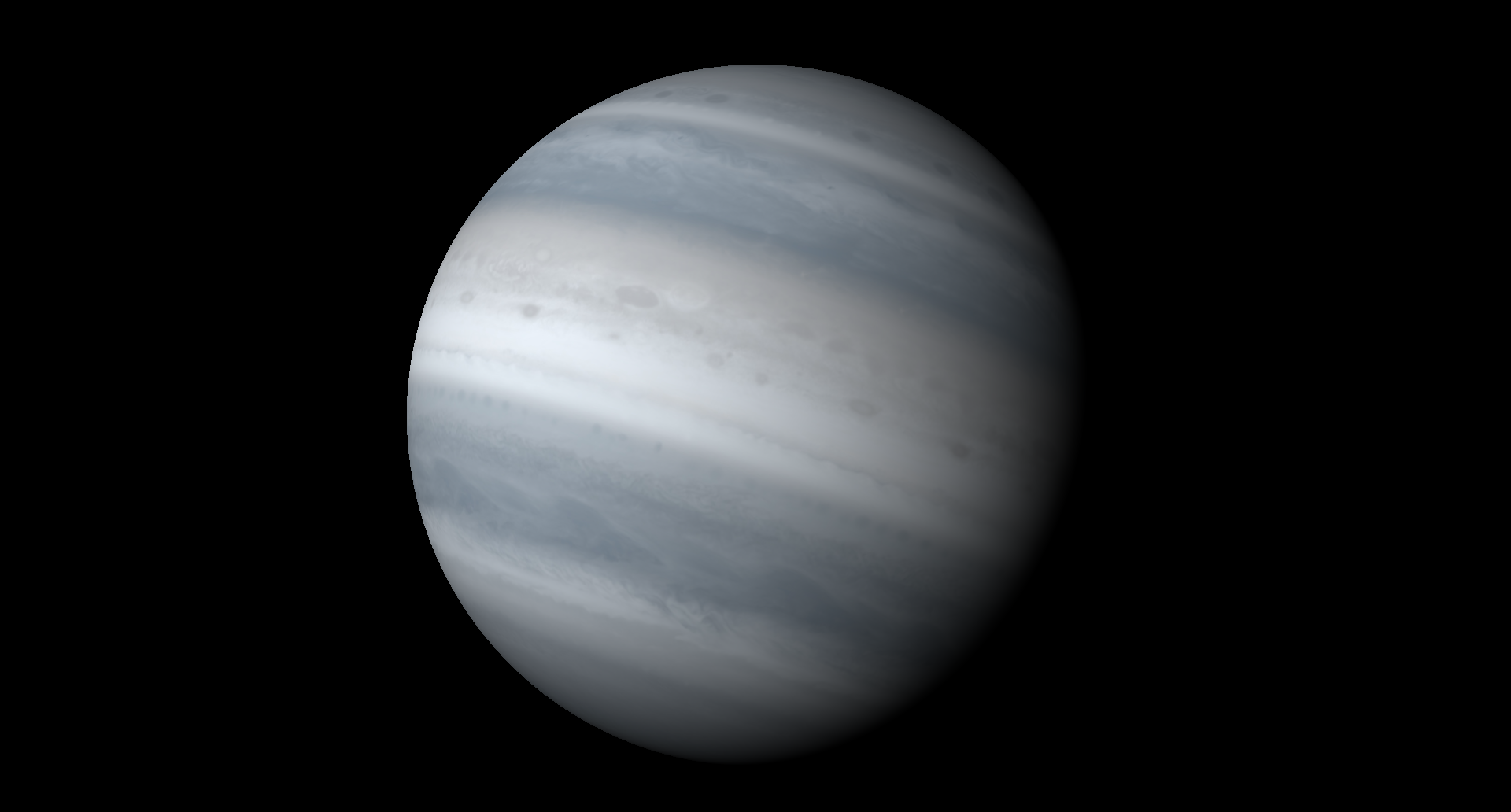
Patchy water ice clouds are detected in WISE 0855, and deep ammonium dihydrogen phosphate clouds may exist. This would make it similar to class II (water clouds) planets on the Sudarsky scale.

== See also ==
- Luhman 16
- UGPS 0722-05
- PSO J318.5-22
- Super-Jupiter
- List of Y-dwarfs
