= List of stars in Delphinus =

This is the list of notable stars in the constellation Delphinus, sorted by decreasing brightness.

Name	B	F	Var	HD	HIP	RA	Dec	vis. mag.	abs. mag.	Dist. (ly)	Sp. class	Notes
β Del	β	6		196524	101769	20^{h} 37^{m} 32.87^{s}	+14° 35′ 42.7″	3.64	1.26	97	F5IV	Rotanev, Rotanen, Venator; spectroscopic binary
α Del	α	9		196867	101958	20^{h} 39^{m} 38.25^{s}	+15° 54′ 43.4″	3.77	−0.57	241	B9V	Sualocin, Scalovin, Svalocin, Nicolaus; binary star; suspected variable, V_{max} = 3.77^{m}, V_{min} = 3.80^{m}
ε Del	ε	2		195810	101421	20^{h} 33^{m} 12.76^{s}	+11° 18′ 12.0″	4.03	−1.18	359	B6III	Aldulfin, Deneb Dulfim, Deneb, Al Dhanab al Dulfim, Dzaneb al Delphin, Cauda Delphini; suspected variable, V_{max} = 3.95^{m}, V_{min} = 4.05^{m}
γ^{2} Del	γ^{2}	12		197964	102532	20^{h} 46^{m} 39.52^{s}	+16° 07′ 29.2″	4.27	1.81	101	K1IV	binary star with γ^{1} Del
δ Del	δ	11		197461	102281	20^{h} 43^{m} 27.55^{s}	+15° 04′ 28.9″	4.43	0.45	203	A7IIIp d Del	δ Sct variable, V_{max} = 4.38^{m}, V_{min} = 4.49^{m}, P = 0.1567924 d
ζ Del	ζ	4		196180	101589	20^{h} 35^{m} 18.51^{s}	+14° 40′ 27.1″	4.64	0.43	227	A3V	suspected variable, V_{max} = 4.64^{m}, V_{min} = 4.70^{m}
ρ Aql	ρ	67		192425	99742	20^{h} 14^{m} 16.59^{s}	+15° 11′ 50.9″	4.94	1.58	153	A2V	Tso Ke; recently moved into Delphinus due to proper motion
κ Del	κ	7		196755	101916	20^{h} 39^{m} 07.59^{s}	+10° 05′ 10.1″	5.07	2.68	98	G5IV+...	
γ^{1} Del	γ^{1}	12		197963	102531	20^{h} 46^{m} 38.87^{s}	+16° 07′ 28.6″	5.15	2.65	103	A2Ia+...	Dhanishta, binary star with γ^{2} Del
17 Del		17		199253	103294	20^{h} 55^{m} 36.68^{s}	+13° 43′ 17.6″	5.19	−0.62	474	K0III	suspected variable, V_{max} = 5.16^{m}, V_{min} = 5.27^{m}
η Del	η	3		195943	101483	20^{h} 33^{m} 57.00^{s}	+13° 01′ 37.9″	5.39	1.77	173	A3IVs	suspected variable, V_{max} = 5.37^{m}, V_{min} = 5.40^{m}
ι Del	ι	5		196544	101800	20^{h} 37^{m} 49.10^{s}	+11° 22′ 39.7″	5.42	1.74	177	A2V	spectroscopic binary
18 Del		18		199665	103527	20^{h} 58^{m} 25.96^{s}	+10° 50′ 21.7″	5.51	1.19	238	G6III:	Musica, optical double, has a planet (b)
16 Del		16		199254	103298	20^{h} 55^{m} 38.55^{s}	+12° 34′ 06.6″	5.54	1.61	199	A4V	double star
13 Del		13		198069	102633	20^{h} 47^{m} 48.33^{s}	+06° 00′ 29.7″	5.57	−0.42	513	A0V	double star
θ Del	θ	8		196725	101882	20^{h} 38^{m} 43.98^{s}	+13° 18′ 54.5″	5.69	−2.32	1304	K3Ib	
HD 200044				200044	103675	21^{h} 00^{m} 27.70^{s}	+19° 19′ 47.0″	5.69	−0.62	596	M3III	suspected variable, ΔV = 0.05^{m}
HD 193472				193472	100256	20^{h} 20^{m} 00.19^{s}	+13° 32′ 53.2″	5.96	1.18	294	A5m	suspected variable
HD 196775				196775	101909	20^{h} 39^{m} 04.97^{s}	+15° 50′ 17.6″	5.99	−2.01	1299	B3V	double star
10 Del		10		197121	102080	20^{h} 41^{m} 16.21^{s}	+14° 34′ 58.4″	6.01	0.13	488	K4III:	suspected variable
15 Del		15		198390	102805	20^{h} 49^{m} 37.74^{s}	+12° 32′ 41.6″	6.01	3.66	96	F5V	double star
1 Del		1		195325	101160	20^{h} 30^{m} 17.95^{s}	+10° 53′ 45.3″	6.03	−0.17	566	A1sh	double star; emission-line star; suspected variable, V_{max} = 5.92^{m}, V_{min} = 6.07^{m}
HD 199223				199223	103301	20^{h} 55^{m} 40.64^{s}	+04° 31′ 57.7″	6.04	0.82	361	G6III-IV	double star
HD 194012				194012	100511	20^{h} 22^{m} 52.32^{s}	+14° 33′ 04.0″	6.16	4.07	85	F8V	
HD 193556				193556	100274	20^{h} 20^{m} 20.53^{s}	+14° 34′ 09.3″	6.17	0.04	550	G8III	
HD 193373				193373	100208	20^{h} 19^{m} 29.31^{s}	+13° 13′ 00.5″	6.20	−0.73	791	M1III	
HD 194953				194953	100969	20^{h} 28^{m} 16.77^{s}	+02° 56′ 13.7″	6.20	0.47	456	G8III/IV	
HD 198404				198404	102833	20^{h} 49^{m} 59.07^{s}	+05° 32′ 40.4″	6.20	0.29	495	K0III	double star
HD 195479				195479	101213	20^{h} 30^{m} 58.10^{s}	+20° 36′ 21.6″	6.21	1.08	346	A1m	triple star
EU Del			EU	196610	101810	20^{h} 37^{m} 54.71^{s}	+18° 16′ 06.4″	6.22	1.03	356	M6III	semiregular variable, V_{max} = 5.41^{m}, V_{min} = 6.72^{m}, P = 58.63 d
HD 194688				194688	100807	20^{h} 26^{m} 23.15^{s}	+17° 18′ 56.1″	6.23	−0.75	813	G8III	
HD 194937				194937	100953	20^{h} 28^{m} 07.52^{s}	+08° 26′ 14.7″	6.23	1.23	326	G9III	
LU Del			LU	197249	102158	20^{h} 41^{m} 58.16^{s}	+17° 31′ 17.0″	6.24	0.63	432	G8III	suspected variable
HD 201196				201196	104281	21^{h} 07^{m} 33.61^{s}	+15° 39′ 31.7″	6.27	1.00	369	K2IV	
HD 194526				194526	100762	20^{h} 25^{m} 44.10^{s}	+10° 03′ 21.9″	6.32	−0.83	876	K5IIIvar	
14 Del		14		198391	102819	20^{h} 49^{m} 48.24^{s}	+07° 51′ 51.0″	6.32	0.32	517	A1Vs	spectroscopic binary
HD 200430				200430	103891	21^{h} 03^{m} 01.78^{s}	+14° 43′ 48.1″	6.33	−0.11	633	M1III	suspected variable
HD 194578				194578	100781	20^{h} 26^{m} 01.58^{s}	+13° 54′ 42.0″	6.35	−0.64	815	K5	suspected variable
HD 198070				198070	102631	20^{h} 47^{m} 47.86^{s}	+03° 18′ 23.2″	6.38	0.60	467	A0Vn	
HD 196885				196885	101966	20^{h} 39^{m} 51.85^{s}	+11° 14′ 58.0″	6.39	3.80	108	F8IV:	binary star; has a planet (b)
HD 195909				195909	101489	20^{h} 33^{m} 59.92^{s}	+04° 53′ 55.3″	6.42	0.02	622	K0	
HD 197076				197076	102040	20^{h} 40^{m} 45.07^{s}	+19° 56′ 05.2″	6.43	4.82	68	G5V	optical double
HD 194841				194841	100876	20^{h} 27^{m} 14.19^{s}	+20° 28′ 35.4″	6.44	−2.09	1655	K0	
HD 194616				194616	100779	20^{h} 26^{m} 01.15^{s}	+19° 51′ 55.6″	6.45	−0.13	675	K0III	
U Del			U	197812	102440	20^{h} 45^{m} 28.23^{s}	+18° 05′ 24.2″	6.74	−1.16	1240	M5II-III	semiregular variable, V_{max} = 6.14^{m}, V_{min} = 7.61^{m}, P = 120 d
HD 195019				195019	100970	20^{h} 28^{m} 18.64^{s}	+18° 46′ 10.2″	6.91	4.05	122	G3IV-V	double star; has a planet (b)
Gliese 795			OQ	196795	101955	20^{h} 39^{m} 37.71^{s}	+04° 58′ 19.3″	7.84		54.52	K5V	triple star; BY Dra variable, ΔV = 0.04^{m}
V Del			V	198136		20^{h} 47^{m} 46.04^{s}	+19° 20′ 06.9″	8.1			M6e:	Mira variable, V_{max} = 8.1^{m}, V_{min} = 17.0^{m}, P = 527 d
DM Del			DM			20^{h} 39^{m} 37.01^{s}	+14° 25′ 43.1″	8.65			A2V	β Lyr variable, V_{max} = 8.58^{m}, V_{min} = 9.11^{m}, P = 0.8446725 d
LS Del			LS	199497		20^{h} 57^{m} 10.29^{s}	+19° 38′ 55.2″	8.72		256.5	G5	W UMa variable, V_{max} = 8.61^{m}, V_{min} = 8.76^{m}, P = 0.363842 d
MR Del			MR	195434	101236	20^{h} 31^{m} 13.46^{s}	+05° 13′ 08.5″	8.77		158.3	K0	Algol and BY Dra variable, V_{max} = 8.71^{m}, V_{min} = 9.01^{m}, P = 0.521692 d
TX Del			TX		102853	20^{h} 50^{m} 12.69^{s}	+03° 39′ 08.4″	8.86			F8	BL Her variable, V_{max} = 8.86^{m}, V_{min} = 9.51^{m}, P = 6.165907 d
DX Del			DX		102593	20^{h} 47^{m} 28.36^{s}	+12° 27′ 50.7″	9.56		4200	A7IIIv	RR Lyr variable, V_{max} = 9.558^{m}, V_{min} = 10.291^{m}, P = 0.4726191 d
W Del			W	352682	101780	20^{h} 37^{m} 40.09^{s}	+18° 17′ 03.8″	9.81		2200	A0Ve	Algol variable, V_{max} = 9.69^{m}, V_{min} = 12.33^{m}, P = 4.8061 d
TY Del			TY			21^{h} 04^{m} 21.98^{s}	+13° 12′ 53.5″	10.08			A0	Algol variable, V_{max} = 9.7^{m}, V_{min} = 10.9^{m}, P = 1.19112689 d
HAT-P-23						20^{h} 24^{m} 30^{s}	+16° 45′ 44″	11.94		1282	G5	Moriah; has a transiting planet (b)
WASP-2						20^{h} 30^{m} 54^{s}	+06° 25′ 46″	11.98			K1V	has a transiting planet (b)
BX Del			BX			20^{h} 21^{m} 18.97^{s}	+18° 26′ 16.2″	11.99			A0	BL Her variable, V_{max} = 11.79^{m}, V_{min} = 12.57^{m}, P = 1.091787 d
WASP-176						20^{h} 54^{m} 45.0^{s}	+09° 10′ 45″	12.00		1885		has a transiting planet (b)
HR Del			HR			20^{h} 42^{m} 20.35^{s}	+19° 09′ 35.3″	12.1			A0	nova, V_{max} = 3.6^{m}, V_{min} = 12.1^{m}, P = 0.214165 d
HU Del			HU			20^{h} 29^{m} 48.34^{s}	+09° 41′ 20.3″	13.04		29.6	M6.0V+...	flare star
He 2-467			LT			20^{h} 35^{m} 57.23^{s}	+20° 11′ 27.5″	13.05			G6III	Z And and rotating ellipsoidal variable, V_{max} = 12.0^{m}, V_{min} = 13.4^{m}, P = 476 d
CM Del			CM			20^{h} 24^{m} 56.93^{s}	+17° 17′ 54.4″	13.40			A0	nova-like star
V339 Del			V339			20^{h} 29^{m} 30.68^{s}	+20° 46′ 03.8″	16.86				nova, V_{max} = 4.3^{m}, V_{min} = 17.6^{m}, P = 1.19112689 d
WISE 2056+1459						20^{h} 56^{m} 28.90^{s}	+14° 59′ 53.3″			22.6	Y0	brown dwarf
Table legend: • Name = Proper name • B = Bayer designation • F or/and G. = Flamsteed designation or Gould designation • Var = Variable-star designation • HD = Henry Draper Catalogue designation number • HIP = Hipparcos Catalogue designation number • RA = Right ascension for the Epoch/Equinox J2000.0 • Dec = Declination for the Epoch/Equinox J2000.0 • vis. mag. = visual magnitude (m or m_{v}), also known as apparent magnitude • abs. mag. = absolute magnitude (M_{v}) • Dist. (ly) = Distance in light-years from Earth • Sp. class = Spectral class of the star in the stellar classification system • Notes = Common name(s) or alternate name(s); comments; notable properties [for example: multiple star status, range of variability if it is a variable star, exoplanets, etc.]

== See also ==
- List of stars by constellation
