= Delphinus in Chinese astronomy =

According to traditional Chinese uranography, the modern constellation Delphinus is located within the northern quadrant of the sky, which is symbolized as the Black Tortoise of the North (北方玄武, Běi Fāng Xuán Wǔ).

The name of the western constellation in modern Chinese is 海豚座 (hǎi tún zuò), meaning "the dolphin constellation".

== Stars ==
The map of Chinese constellation in constellation Delphinus area consists of :

Four Symbols	Mansion (Chinese name)	Romanization	Translation	Asterisms (Chinese name)	Romanization	Translation	Western star name	Proper Name	Chinese star name	Romanization	Translation
Black Tortoise of the North (北方玄武)	女	Nǚ	Girl	敗瓜	Bàiguā	Rotten Gourd					
Black Tortoise of the North (北方玄武)	女	Nǚ	Girl	敗瓜	Bàiguā	Rotten Gourd	ε Del	Aldulfin	敗瓜一	Bàiguāyī	1st star
Black Tortoise of the North (北方玄武)	女	Nǚ	Girl	敗瓜	Bàiguā	Rotten Gourd	η Del		敗瓜二	Bàiguāèr	2nd star
Black Tortoise of the North (北方玄武)	女	Nǚ	Girl	敗瓜	Bàiguā	Rotten Gourd	θ Del		敗瓜三	Bàiguāsān	3rd star
Black Tortoise of the North (北方玄武)	女	Nǚ	Girl	敗瓜	Bàiguā	Rotten Gourd	ι Del		敗瓜四	Bàiguāsì	4th star
Black Tortoise of the North (北方玄武)	女	Nǚ	Girl	敗瓜	Bàiguā	Rotten Gourd	κ Del		敗瓜五	Bàiguāwu	5th star
Black Tortoise of the North (北方玄武)	女	Nǚ	Girl	敗瓜	Bàiguā	Rotten Gourd	1 Del		敗瓜增一	Bàiguāzēngyī	1st additional star
Black Tortoise of the North (北方玄武)	女	Nǚ	Girl	敗瓜	Bàiguā	Rotten Gourd	14 Del		敗瓜增二	Bàiguāzēngèr	2nd additional star
Black Tortoise of the North (北方玄武)	女	Nǚ	Girl	敗瓜	Bàiguā	Rotten Gourd	13 Del		敗瓜增三	Bàiguāzēngsān	3rd additional star
Black Tortoise of the North (北方玄武)	女	Nǚ	Girl	瓠瓜	Hùguā	Good Gourd					
Black Tortoise of the North (北方玄武)	女	Nǚ	Girl	瓠瓜	Hùguā	Good Gourd	α Del	Sualocin (for component Aa)	瓠瓜一	Hùguāyī	1st star
Black Tortoise of the North (北方玄武)	女	Nǚ	Girl	瓠瓜	Hùguā	Good Gourd	γ^{2} Del		瓠瓜二	Hùguāèr	2nd star
Black Tortoise of the North (北方玄武)	女	Nǚ	Girl	瓠瓜	Hùguā	Good Gourd	δ Del		瓠瓜三	Hùguāsān	3rd star
Black Tortoise of the North (北方玄武)	女	Nǚ	Girl	瓠瓜	Hùguā	Good Gourd	β Del	Rotanev (for component A)	瓠瓜四	Hùguāsì	4th star
Black Tortoise of the North (北方玄武)	女	Nǚ	Girl	瓠瓜	Hùguā	Good Gourd	ζ Del		瓠瓜五	Hùguāwu	5th star
Black Tortoise of the North (北方玄武)	女	Nǚ	Girl	瓠瓜	Hùguā	Good Gourd	10 Del		瓠瓜增一	Hùguāzēngyī	1st additional star
Black Tortoise of the North (北方玄武)	女	Nǚ	Girl	瓠瓜	Hùguā	Good Gourd	15 Del		瓠瓜增二	Hùguāzēngèr	2nd additional star
Black Tortoise of the North (北方玄武)	女	Nǚ	Girl	瓠瓜	Hùguā	Good Gourd	16 Del		瓠瓜增三	Hùguāzēngsān	3rd additional star
Black Tortoise of the North (北方玄武)	女	Nǚ	Girl	瓠瓜	Hùguā	Good Gourd	17 Del		瓠瓜增四	Hùguāzēngsì	4th additional star
Black Tortoise of the North (北方玄武)	女	Nǚ	Girl	瓠瓜	Hùguā	Good Gourd	HD 196775		瓠瓜增六	Hùguāzēngliù	6th additional star
Black Tortoise of the North (北方玄武)	女	Nǚ	Girl	瓠瓜	Hùguā	Good Gourd	γ^{1} Del	Dhanishta (for component A)	瓠瓜增七	Hùguāzēngqī	7th additional star
Black Tortoise of the North (北方玄武)	虛	Xū	Emptiness	司非	Sīfēi	Deified Judge of Right and Wrong	18 Del	Musica	司非增二	Sīfēizēngèr	2nd additional star

== See also ==
- Chinese astronomy
- Traditional Chinese star names
- Chinese constellations
