= Epsilon Delphini =

Star in the constellation Delphinus

- Location of ε Delphini (circled)

Observation data Epoch J2000 Equinox ICRS
- Constellation: Delphinus
- Right ascension: 20^{h} 33^{m} 12.773^{s}
- Declination: +11° 18′ 11.759″
- Apparent magnitude (V): 4.03 (3.95−4.05)

Characteristics
- Spectral type: B6 III or B6IV
- U−B color index: −0.46
- B−V color index: −0.13
- Variable type: Suspected

Astrometry
Radial velocity (R_{v})	−19.4±0.7 km/s
Proper motion (μ)	RA: +10.915 mas/yr Dec.: −19.606 mas/yr
Parallax (π)	8.9149±0.1993 mas
Distance	366 ± 8 ly (112 ± 3 pc)
Absolute magnitude (M_{V})	−0.06

Details
Radius	4.6 R_{☉}
Luminosity	676 L_{☉}
Surface gravity (log g)	3.71±0.09 cgs
Temperature	13,614±15 K
Metallicity [Fe/H]	+0.08±0.10 dex
Rotational velocity (v sin i)	52±4 km/s
Age	220 Myr

Other designations
- Aldulfin, ε Del, 2 Del, BD+10°4321, FK5 768, HD 195810, HIP 101421, HR 7852, SAO 106230

Database references
SIMBAD	data

Epsilon Delphini is a solitary, blue-white hued star in the northern constellation of Delphinus. It has the proper name Aldulfin, pronounced /ælˈdʌlfən/. This star is visible to the naked eye with an apparent visual magnitude of 4.03. Based upon an annual parallax shift of 9.87 mas as seen from the Earth, the system is located at a distance of approximately 366 light-years from the Sun. The visual magnitude is diminished by an extinction factor of 0.11 due to interstellar dust. The star is moving closer to the Sun with a radial velocity of −19 km/s.

With a stellar classification of B6 III or B6IV, it presents as an aging giant or subgiant star that has exhausted the supply of hydrogen at its core and has evolved off the main sequence. It has 4.6 times the Sun's radius and is radiating 676 times the solar luminosity from its photosphere at an effective temperature of 13,614 K. The star may be slightly variable, occasionally brightening to magnitude 3.95. It is spinning with a projected rotational velocity of 52 km/s.

== Proper names ==
ε Delphini (Latinised to Epsilon Delphini) is the star's Bayer designation, which is abbreviated Eps Del or ε Del.

The star bore the traditional Arabic name ðanab ad-dulfīn or Dzaneb al Delphin, which appeared in the catalogue of stars in the Calendarium of Al Achsasi Al Mouakket and which was translated into Latin as Cauda Delphini, meaning 'the dolphin's tail'. In 2016, the IAU organized a Working Group on Star Names (WGSN) to catalog and standardize proper names for stars. The WGSN approved the name Aldulfin for this star on 5 September 2017 and it is now so included in the List of IAU-approved Star Names.

In Chinese, 敗瓜 (Bài Guā), meaning Rotten Gourd, refers to an asterism consisting of Epsilon Delphini, Eta Delphini, Theta Delphini, Iota Delphini and Kappa Delphini. Consequently, the Chinese name for Epsilon Delphini itself is 敗瓜一 (Bài Guā yī, English: the First Star of Rotten Gourd.). From this Chinese name, the name Pae Chaou was formed.
