= HD 196050 b =

Extrasolar planet in the constellation Pavo

Discovery
- Discovered by: Jones et al.
- Discovery site: Anglo-Australian Observatory
- Discovery date: 13 June 2002
- Detection method: Doppler spectroscopy (AAT)

Orbital characteristics
- Semi-major axis: 2.585+0.032 −0.035 AU
- Eccentricity: 0.178±0.011
- Orbital period (sidereal): 1393±9 d 3.813+0.026 −0.024 yr
- Average orbital speed: 20.1
- Inclination: 41.0°+10.0° −6.3° or 139.0°+6.3° −10.0°
- Longitude of ascending node: 15.2°+157.0° −9.2°
- Time of periastron: 2456307+46 −47
- Argument of periastron: 165.3°+9.4° −10.0°
- Semi-amplitude: 49.7 ± 2
- Star: HD 196050

Physical characteristics
- Mass: 4.55+0.69 −0.72 M_{J}

HD 196050 b is an exoplanet with a 1378-day period and a minimum mass of 2.90 Jupiter masses. The average orbital distance is 2.54 astronomical units and the orbital eccentricity is 22.8%. The periastron (closest) distance is 1.96 AU and the apastron (farthest) distance is 3.12 AU. The average orbital velocity is 20.1 km/s and the semi-amplitude is 49.7 m/s. The longitude of periastron is 187° and the time of periastron is 2,450,843 JD.

The planet was discovered by using Doppler spectroscopy by looking for shifts in the spectrum of the star. In Australia, Jones et al. found this planet in 2002 by using the telescope in Anglo-Australian Observatory. In 2023, the inclination and true mass of HD 196050 b were determined via astrometry.

== See also ==
- HD 190228 b
- HD 195019 b
