= HD 196050 =

Triple star system in the constellation Pavo

Observation data Epoch J2000 Equinox ICRS
- Constellation: Pavo
- Right ascension: 20^{h} 37^{m} 51.70984^{s}
- Declination: −60° 38′ 04.1460″
- Apparent magnitude (V): 7.50 + 10.62 + 15.6

Characteristics
- Spectral type: G3V + M1.5-M4.5 + M2.5-M5.5
- B−V color index: 0.667±0.010

Astrometry
Radial velocity (R_{v})	+61.37±0.12 km/s
Proper motion (μ)	RA: −191.118(14) mas/yr Dec.: −65.020(15) mas/yr
Parallax (π)	19.7872±0.0205 mas
Distance	164.8 ± 0.2 ly (50.54 ± 0.05 pc)
Absolute magnitude (M_{V})	4.01

Details

A
Mass	1.18±0.02 M_{☉}
Radius	1.46+0.02 −0.03 R_{☉}
Luminosity	2.213+0.007 −0.006 L_{☉}
Surface gravity (log g)	4.32 cgs
Temperature	5,834+55 −52 K
Metallicity [Fe/H]	0.34±0.06 dex
Rotation	16.0 d
Rotational velocity (v sin i)	3.0 km/s
Age	2.5±1.3 Gyr

Other designations
- CPD−61° 6497, HD 196050, HIP 101806, SAO 254837, PPM 364690, WDS J20379-6038AB

Database references
SIMBAD	data

HD 196050 is a triple star system located in the southern constellation of Pavo. This system has an apparent magnitude of 7.50 and the absolute magnitude is 4.01. It is located at a distance of 165 light-years (51 parsecs) from the Sun based on parallax, and is drifting further away with a radial velocity of +61 km/s. It is also called by the Hipparcos designation HIP 101806.

== Characteristics ==
The primary component is a G-type main-sequence star with a stellar classification of G3V. It has a quiescent chromosphere and does not appear to be variable. The star has 18% more mass than the Sun and a 46% greater size. It is around 2.5 billion years old with a higher than solar metallicity, and is spinning with a projected rotational velocity of 3 km/s. The star is radiating 2.21 times the luminosity of the Sun from its photosphere at an effective temperature of 5,834 K.

A faint co-moving companion star, designated component B, was detected based on observations during 2003–2004, located 10.80″ to the south of the primary component. This corresponds to a projected separation of 7,511±22 AU. The star is magnitude 10.62 A third companion, component C, was discovered in 2007, located about 0.4″ from component B. It has a visual magnitude of 15.6.

== Planetary system ==
In 2002, the Anglo-Australian Planet Search team announced the discovery of an extrasolar planet orbiting the star. The discovery was independently confirmed by the Geneva Extrasolar Planet Search team. In 2023, the inclination and true mass of HD 196050 b were determined via astrometry.

The HD 196050 planetary system
Companion (in order from star)	Mass	Semimajor axis (AU)	Orbital period (years)	Eccentricity	Inclination (°)	Radius
b	4.55+0.69 −0.72 M_{J}	2.585+0.032 −0.035	3.813+0.026 −0.024	0.178±0.011	41.0+10.0 −6.3 or 139.0+6.3 −10.0	—

== See also ==
- HD 190228
- HD 195019
- List of extrasolar planets
