= WISE 1541−2250 =

Star in the constellation Libra

WISEPA J154151.66−225025.2
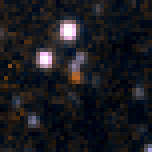
- WISE 1541-2250 is the orange object in the center Credit: unWISE

Observation data Epoch MJD 55424.68 Equinox J2000
- Constellation: Libra
- Right ascension: 15^{h} 41^{m} 51.57^{s}
- Declination: −22° 50′ 25.03″

Characteristics
- Spectral type: Y0.5
- Apparent magnitude (J (MKO filter system)): 21.16±0.36
- Apparent magnitude (H (MKO filter system)): 20.99±0.52

Astrometry
Proper motion (μ)	RA: −903.02±0.41 mas/yr Dec.: −87.93±0.27 mas/yr
Parallax (π)	172.28±1.55 mas
Distance	18.9 ± 0.2 ly (5.80 ± 0.05 pc)

Details
Mass	12±2 M_{Jup}
Radius	1.14±0.02 R_{Jup}
Surface gravity (log g)	4.37±0.08 cgs
Temperature	381±3 K
Metallicity	$\begin{smallmatrix}\left[\ce{M}/\ce{H}\right]\end{smallmatrix}$ = 0.70±0.05
Age	2 Gyr

Other designations
- WISEPA J154151.66−225025.2; WISEP J1541−2250; WISE J1541−2250; WISE 1541−2250

Database references
SIMBAD	data
- Location of WISE 1541−2250 in the constellation Libra

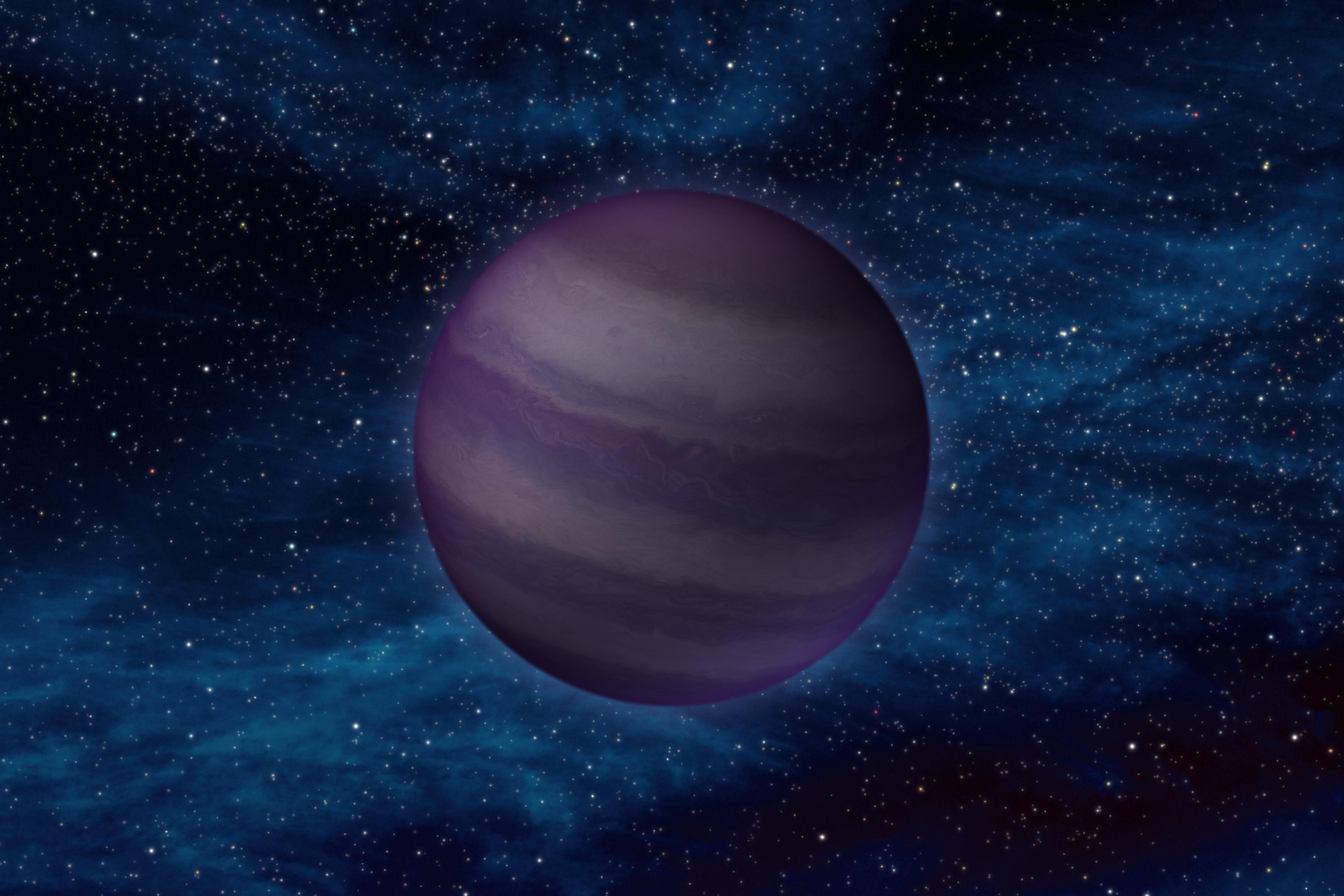
Artist's vision of a Y-dwarf

WISE 1541−2250 (full designation WISEPA J154151.66−225025.2) is a brown dwarf of spectral class Y0.5, located in the constellation Libra at approximately 18.6 light-years from Earth. This object received popular attention when its discovery was announced in 2011 at a distance estimated to be only about 9 light-years, which would have made it the closest brown dwarf known. (For really close brown dwarfs see, for example, Luhman 16, WISE 1506+7027, Epsilon Indi Ba, Bb, or UGPS 0722-05). It is not the farthest known Y-type brown dwarf to Earth.

== History of observations ==
=== Discovery ===
WISE 1541−2250 was discovered in 2011 from data collected by the Wide-field Infrared Survey Explorer (WISE) in the infrared at a wavelength of 40 cm (16 in), whose mission lasted from December 2009 to February 2011. WISE 1541−2250 has two discovery papers: Kirkpatrick et al. (2011) and Cushing et al. (2011) with mostly the same authors and published nearly simultaneously.

- Kirkpatrick and collaborators presented the discovery of 98 brown dwarf systems with components of spectral types M, L, T and Y, among which was WISE 1541−2250. (Note: These 98 brown-dwarf systems are among the first brown-dwarf systems discovered in data collected by WISE and six discoveries were published earlier (however, also listed in Kirkpatrick et al. (2011)) in Mainzer et al. (2011) and Burgasser et al. (2011), and the other discoveries were published later.)
- Cushing and collaborators presented the discovery of seven brown dwarfs, one of the T9.5 type and six of the Y-type, the first members of the Y spectral class discovered and spectroscopically confirmed, including an "archetypal member" of the Y spectral class, WISE 1828+2650, and WISE 1541−2250. These seven objects are also the faintest seven of 98 brown dwarfs presented in Kirkpatrick et al. (2011).

== Distance ==
Currently the most accurate distance estimate of WISE 1541−2250 is a trigonometric parallax, published in 2014 by Tinney et al.: 0.1751 ± 0.0044 arcsec, corresponding to a distance 5.71^{+0.15}_{−0.14} pc, or 18.6 ± 0.5 ly.

For several months after its discovery, before the publication of its parallax by Kirkpatrick et al. in 2012, WISE 1541−2250 was considered to be the nearest known brown dwarf at approximately 9 light-years from the Sun, and the seventh-nearest of all star systems, at slightly more than twice the distance of the nearest known star system Alpha Centauri. This view existed because of a very rough preliminary parallax with a baseline of 1.2 years, published in the discovery paper: 0.351 ± 0.108 arcsec, corresponding to a distance 2.8^{+1.3}_{−0.6} pc, or 9.3^{+4.1}_{−2.2} ly. Also, there were other estimates: spectrophotometric distance estimate 8.2 pc (26.7 ly), and photometric distance estimate 1.8^{+0.2}_{−0} pc (5.9^{+0.6}_{−0} ly).

== Space motion ==
WISE 1541−2250 has proper motion of about 899 milliarcseconds per year.

== Physical properties ==
WISE 1541−2250 is among the first known examples of a Y-class brown dwarf, the coldest spectral class of stars, and has temperature about 381 K (108 °C; 226 °F). Its spectral class is Y0.5 (initially was estimated as Y0). Modelling of WISE 1541−2250 has shown that there could be water clouds in the atmosphere of this brown dwarf. Models however struggle to reproduce the spectrum even with water clouds. A study using JWST NIRSpec and MIRI data found an elevated abundance of carbon monoxide and carbon dioxide. Additionally the model favours gray cloud cover. The model suggest the cloud top is located at 0.47+0.04
−0.06 bar, which is close the condensation temperature of water vapor, but is too warm for condensation. The optical depth supports an optical dense and vertical extended cloud layer, consistent with the onset of water cloud formation. Stable cloud layers predicted by the FastChem code are arsenic(II) sulfide (As_{2}S_{2}) and ammonium bromide near 0.5 bar. It is unclear if these compounds could form optically thick clouds. Neither water nor sodium sulfide clouds are predicted to be present by FastChem.

== See also ==
The other six discoveries of brown dwarfs, published in Cushing et al. (2011):

- WISE 0148−7202 (T9.5)
- WISE 0410+1502 (Y0)
- WISE 1405+5534 (Y0 (pec?))
- WISE 1738+2732 (Y0)
- WISE 1828+2650 (≥Y2)
- WISE 2056+1459 (Y0)

Lists:

- List of brown dwarfs
- List of nearest stars
- List of Y-dwarfs
