= WASP-1b =

Extrasolar planet in the Andromeda constellation

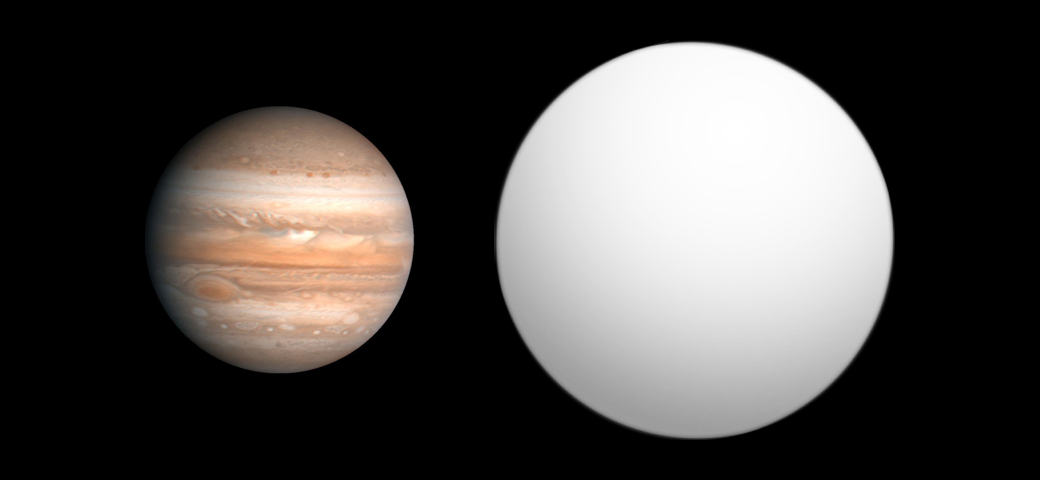
- Size comparison of WASP-1b with Jupiter

Discovery
- Discovered by: Cameron et al.(SuperWASP and SOPHIE); South Africa and France
- Discovery site: SAAO
- Discovery date: September 25, 2006
- Detection method: Transit

Orbital characteristics
- Semi-major axis: 0.03958 ^{+0.00047}_{−0.00049} AU
- Eccentricity: <0.013
- Orbital period (sidereal): 2.51994701 ± 0.00000030 d
- Inclination: 90.0 ± 1.3°
- Time of periastron: 2,456,031.78981±0.00020
- Argument of periastron: 91.10+170.00 −6.30
- Semi-amplitude: 118.7+1.9 −2.0 m/s
- Star: WASP-1

Physical characteristics
- Mean radius: 1.612+0.137 −0.230 R_{J}
- Mass: 0.948+0.029 −0.028 M_{J}
- Mean density: 0.339+0.037 −0.034 g cm^{−3}
- Surface gravity: 12.5 m/s^{2} (41 ft/s^{2}); 1.27 g
- Temperature: 1812±14 K

WASP-1b is an extrasolar planet orbiting the star WASP-1 located 1,300 light-years away in the constellation Andromeda.

== Orbit and mass ==
The radial velocity trend of WASP-1, caused by the presence of WASP-1 b

The planet's mass and radius indicate that it is a gas giant with a similar bulk composition to Jupiter. Unlike Jupiter, but similar to many other planets detected around other stars, WASP-1b is located very close to its star, and belongs to the class of planets known as hot Jupiters.

WASP-1 b was discovered via the transit method by SuperWASP, for which the star and planet are named. Follow-up radial velocity measurements confirmed the presence of an unseen companion, and allowed for the mass of WASP-1 b to be determined.

In 2018, it was discovered via observations of the Rossiter-McLaughlin effect that the orbit of WASP-1b is strongly misaligned with rotational axis of the star by 79.0^{+4.3}_{−4.5} degrees, making it a nearly "polar" orbit.

== See also ==
- HD 209458 b
- WASP-2b
