= WISE 1405+5534 =

Brown dwarf in the constellation Ursa Major

WISEPC J140518.40+553421.4
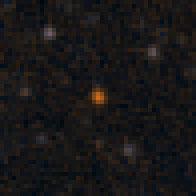
- WISE 1405+5534; Credit: unWISE

Observation data Epoch MJD 55545.11 Equinox J2000
- Constellation: Ursa Major
- Right ascension: 14^{h} 05^{m} 18.27^{s}
- Declination: 55° 34′ 21.22″

Characteristics
- Spectral type: Y0 (pec?)
- Apparent magnitude (J (MKO filter system)): 20.20 ± 0.13
- Apparent magnitude (H (MKO filter system)): 21.45 ± 0.41

Astrometry
Proper motion (μ)	RA: −2263 ± 47 mas/yr Dec.: 288 ± 41 mas/yr
Parallax (π)	158.2±2.6 mas
Distance	20.6 ± 0.3 ly (6.3 ± 0.1 pc)

Details
Mass	8±1 M_{Jup}
Radius	0.93±0.01 R_{Jup}
Surface gravity (log g)	4.38+0.04 −0.05 cgs
Temperature	405±3 K
Metallicity	$\begin{smallmatrix}\left[\ce{M}/\ce{H}\right]\end{smallmatrix}$ = 0.11±0.02
Rotation	8.42±0.06 h
Age	2 Gyr

Other designations
- WISEPC J140518.40+553421.4; WISEPC J1405+5534; WISE J1405+5534; WISE 1405+5534

Database references
SIMBAD	data
- Location of WISE 1405+5534 in the constellation Ursa Major

WISEPC J140518.40+553421.4 (abbreviated WISE 1405+5534) is a brown dwarf of spectral class Y0 (pec?), located in constellation Ursa Major at approximately 20.6 light-years from Earth. It is one of the Sun's nearest neighbors.

== Discovery ==
WISE 1405+5534 was discovered in 2011 from data collected by the Wide-field Infrared Survey Explorer (WISE) in the infrared at a wavelength of 40 cm (16 in). WISE 1405+5534 has two discovery papers: Kirkpatrick et al. (2011) and Cushing et al. (2011), however, basically with the same authors and published nearly simultaneously.

- Kirkpatrick et al. presented discovery of 98 new found by WISE brown dwarf systems with components of spectral types M, L, T and Y, among which also was WISE 1405+5534. (Note: These 98 brown dwarf systems are only among first, not all brown dwarf systems, discovered from data, collected by WISE: six discoveries were published earlier (however, also listed in Kirkpatrick et al. (2011)) in Mainzer et al. (2011) and Burgasser et al. (2011), and the other discoveries were published later.)
- Cushing et al. presented discovery of seven brown dwarfs—one of T9.5 type, and six of Y-type—first members of the Y spectral class, ever discovered and spectroscopically confirmed, including "archetypal member" of the Y spectral class WISE 1828+2650, and WISE 1405+5534. These seven objects are also the faintest seven of 98 brown dwarfs, presented in Kirkpatrick et al. (2011).

== Distance ==
An older distance estimate of WISE 1405+5534 is a trigonometric parallax, measured using Spitzer Space Telescope and published in 2013 by Trent Dupuy and Adam Kraus: 0.129 ± 0.019 arcsec, corresponding to a distance 7.8^{+1.3}_{−1.0} pc, or 25.3^{+4.4}_{−3.2} ly. Later the parallax was refined to 158.2±2.6 mas, showing that it is closer at about 6.3 pc, or 20.6 light years.

WISE 1405+5534 distance estimates

Source	Parallax, mas	Distance, pc	Distance, ly	Ref.
Kirkpatrick et al. (2011), Table 6		~ 8.6	~ 28.0	
Cushing et al. (2011), Table 7		~ 3.8	~ 12.4	
Marsh et al. (2013) (according to Kirkpatrick et al. (2012))	207 ± 39	4.8^{+1.1}_{−0.8}	15.8^{+3.7}_{−2.5}	
Marsh et al. (2013)	133 ± 81	>3.4 (Note: In this parallax and distance estimates the distance value does not equal to inverse maximum likelihood parallax value, as would be in the case of exact parallax and distance values. This is due to the fact that Marsh et al. used a more sophisticated method of converting maximum likelihood parallaxes into most probable distances, that uses also some prior information, and not just the calculation of the inverse value. (The method description see in Marsh et al. (2013), Section 4).)	>11.1	
Dupuy & Kraus (2013)	**129 ± 19** (Note: Relative parallax.)	**7.8^{+1.3}_{−1.0}**	**25.3^{+4.4}_{−3.2}**	

Non-trigonometric distance estimates are marked in italic. The most precise estimate is marked in bold.

== Space motion ==
WISE 1405+5534 has a large proper motion of about 2281 milliarcseconds per year.

WISE 1405+5534 proper motion estimates

Source	μ, mas/yr	P. A., °	μ_{RA}, mas/yr	μ_{DEC}, mas/yr	Ref.
Kirkpatrick et al. (2011)	2693	272	−2691 ± 292	95 ± 271	
Marsh et al. (2013)	2307	275	−2297 ± 96	212 ± 137	
Dupuy & Kraus (2013)	**2281 ± 48**	**277.3 ± 1.0**	**−2263 ± 47**	**288 ± 41**	

The most accurate estimates are marked in bold.

== Physical properties ==
The object's temperature estimate is 405 ± 3 K (131.85 ± 3.00 °C; 269.33 ± 5.40 °F). Its spectrum is similar with spectrum of another Y-dwarf WISE 1738+2732. However, WISE 1405+5534's spectrum has a red shift of H-band flux peak, suggesting that WISE 1405+5534 may be peculiar, therefore it is classified as Y0 (pec?). One work has shown that models that include optically thin sulfides, KCl and Cr clouds fit the observed photometry of WISE 1405+5534 better. This is however a tentative result. At this low temperature of WISE 1405+5534 water should condense and form clouds. Another team observed WISE 1405+5534 with the Very Large Array to search for radio emission coming from an aurora, but was not able to detect any.

== Variability ==
WISE 1405+5534 was the first Y-dwarf with a detected variability. The discovery was made with the Spitzer Space Telescope. The Y-dwarf was observed in two epochs. The first epoch was a 24-hour-long observation and the second epoch was 149 days later and was also 24 hours long. The first epoch is only variable at 4.5 μm and the second epoch is variable in both 3.6 and 4.5 μm. This means that the variability changes on the timescale of months. The light curve in the second epoch had a semi-amplitude of 3.5% and a rotation period of 8.5 hours. A single bright spot reproduced the observations well. Other models that included clouds and hot spots were not able to reproduce the variability.

== See also ==
- List of Y-dwarfs
- List of star systems within 20–25 light-years
- WISE 0148-7202 (T9.5)
- WISE 0410+1502 (Y0)
- WISE 1541-2250 (Y0.5)
- WISE 1738+2732 (Y0)
- WISE 1828+2650 (≥Y2)
- WISE 2056+1459 (Y0)
