= WISEPA J041022.71+150248.5 =

Brown dwarf in the constellation Taurus

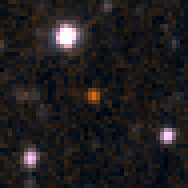
- WISE 0410+1502; Credit: unWISE

Observation data Epoch MJD 55434.04 Equinox J2000
- Constellation: Taurus
- Right ascension: 04^{h} 10^{m} 22.79^{s}
- Declination: +15° 02′ 47.5″

Characteristics
- Spectral type: Y0V
- Apparent magnitude (J (MKO filter system)): 19.25±0.5
- Apparent magnitude (H (MKO filter system)): 19.05±0.09

Astrometry
Proper motion (μ)	RA: 959.87±0.17 mas/yr Dec.: −2218.82±0.18 mas/yr
Parallax (π)	153.01±0.70 mas
Distance	21.32 ± 0.10 ly (6.54 ± 0.03 pc)

Details
Mass	3 (3–9) M_{Jup}
Radius	1.22 (1.09–1.22) R_{Jup}
Surface gravity (log g)	3.75 (3.75–4.25) cgs
Temperature	451±88 K
Rotation	8.0±0.14 h

Other designations
- WISEPA J041022.71+150248.5; WISEP J0410+1502; WISE J0410+1502; WISE 0410+1502

Database references
SIMBAD	data

WISEPA J041022.71+150248.5 (abbreviated WISE 0410+1502) is a sub-brown dwarf (Note: Since its mass estimate 3 (3–9) M_{Jup} is below the lower brown dwarf mass limit ~13 M_{Jup}, it may be actually a sub-brown dwarf or a rogue planet.) of spectral class Y0, located in the constellation Taurus. At approximately 21.6 light-years from Earth, it is the nearest celestial object in Taurus.

== History of observations ==
=== Discovery ===
WISE 0410+1502 was discovered in 2011 from data, collected by Wide-field Infrared Survey Explorer (WISE) Earth-orbiting satellite—NASA infrared-wavelength 40 cm (16 in) space telescope, which mission lasted from December 2009 to February 2011. WISE 0410+1502 has two discovery papers: Kirkpatrick et al. (2011) and Cushing et al. (2011), however, basically with the same authors and published nearly simultaneously.

- Kirkpatrick et al. presented discovery of 98 new found by WISE brown dwarf systems with components of spectral types M, L, T and Y, among which also was WISE 0410+1502. (Note: These 98 brown dwarf systems are only among first, not all brown dwarf systems, discovered from data, collected by WISE: six discoveries were published earlier (however, also listed in Kirkpatrick et al. (2011)) in Mainzer et al. (2011) and Burgasser et al. (2011), and the other discoveries were published later.)
- Cushing et al. presented discovery of seven brown dwarfs—one of T9.5 type, and six of Y-type—first members of the Y spectral class, ever discovered and spectroscopically confirmed, including "archetypal member" of the Y spectral class WISE 1828+2650, and WISE 0410+1502. These seven objects are also the faintest seven of 98 brown dwarfs, presented in Kirkpatrick et al. (2011).

== Distance ==
Currently the most accurate distance estimate of WISE 0410+1502 is a trigonometric parallax, published in 2021 by Kirkpatrick et al.: 151.3±2.0 mas, corresponding to a distance 6.61±0.09 pc, or 21.6±0.3 ly. An outdated parallax by Marsh et al. in 2013 corresponded to an even closer distance of approximately 14 light-years.

== Space motion ==
WISE 0410+1502 has a large proper motion of 2,418.3±1.1 milliarcseconds per year. The brown dwarf WISE 0410+1502 lies in local void 6.5 parsecs across, where relatively few stars and brown dwarfs are located.

== Physical properties ==
The object's temperature estimate is 451±88 K. Cushing et al. obtained a low-resolution Magellan/FIRE spectrum and later they obtained a higher quality spectrum with Hubble WFC3, confirming the Y0 spectral type. The fitting of the spectrum with cloudy models produces realistic values and Leggett et al. finds a mass of about 10–15 M_{J}. The atmosphere is likely in a chemical disequilibrium and a cloud-free disequilibrium model does fit well with the Y- and H-band, but does not fit well with the J-band.

== See also ==
Lists:

- List of star systems within 20–25 light years
- List of Y-dwarfs

The other six discoveries of brown dwarfs, published in Cushing et al. (2011):

- WISE 0148-7202 (T9.5)
- WISE 1405+5534 (Y0 (pec?))
- WISE 1541-2250 (Y0.5)
- WISE 1738+2732 (Y0)
- WISE 1828+2650 (>Y2)
- WISE 2056+1459 (Y0)
