= WISE 1828+2650 =

Rogue planet or brown dwarf in the constellation Lyra

WISEPA J182831.08+265037.8
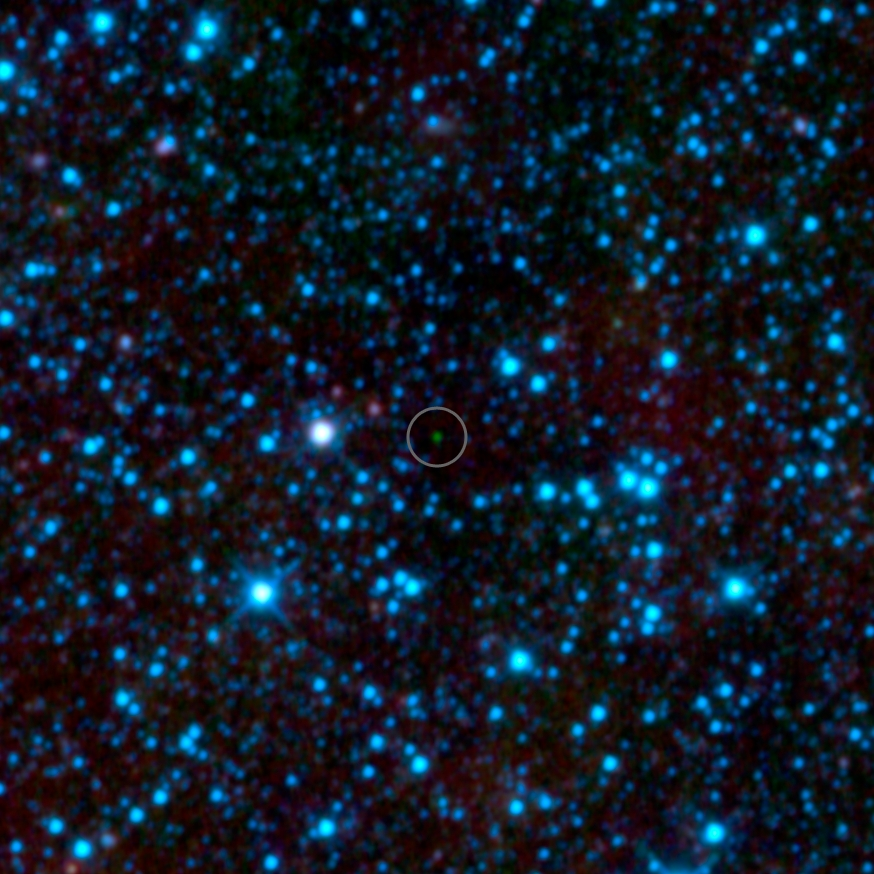
- WISE 1828+2650 is circled in the centre (Infrared image from the WISE space telescope).

Observation data Epoch MJD 55467.61 Equinox J2000
- Constellation: Lyra
- Right ascension: 18^{h} 28^{m} 31.10^{s}
- Declination: 26° 50′ 37.79″

Characteristics
- Spectral type: >Y2V
- Apparent magnitude (J (MKO filter system)): 23.57 ± 0.35
- Apparent magnitude (H (MKO filter system)): 22.45 ± 0.08

Astrometry
Proper motion (μ)	RA: 1,016.5±0.8 mas/yr Dec.: 169.3±0.8 mas/yr
Parallax (π)	100.3±2.0 mas
Distance	32.5 ± 0.6 ly (10.0 ± 0.2 pc)

Details
Mass	3–6 or 0.5–20 M_{Jup}
Temperature	406±88 K
Age	2–4 or 0.1–10 Gyr

Other designations
- WISEPA J182831.08+265037.8; WISEP J182831.08+265037.8; WISEP J1828+2650; WISE J1828+2650; WISE 1828+2650

Database references
SIMBAD	data

WISE 1828+2650 (full designation WISEPA J182831.08+265037.8) is a possibly binary brown dwarf or rogue planet of spectral class >Y2, located in the constellation Lyra at approximately 32.5 light-years from Earth. It is the "archetypal member" of the Y spectral class.

== History of observations ==
=== Discovery ===
WISE 1828+2650 was discovered in 2011 from data collected by NASA's 40 cm (16 in) Wide-field Infrared Survey Explorer (WISE) space telescope at infrared wavelength. WISE 1828+2650 has two discovery papers: Kirkpatrick et al. (2011) and Cushing et al. (2011), however, basically with the same authors and published nearly simultaneously.

- Kirkpatrick et al. presented discovery of 98 new found by WISE brown dwarf systems with components of spectral types M, L, T and Y, among which also was WISE 1828+2650 – coolest of them. (Note: These 98 brown dwarf systems are only among first, not all brown dwarf systems, discovered from data, collected by WISE: six discoveries were published earlier (however, also listed in Kirkpatrick et al. (2011)) in Mainzer et al. (2011) and Burgasser et al. (2011), and the other discoveries were published later.)
- Cushing et al. presented discovery of seven brown dwarfs – one of T9.5 type, and six of Y-type – first members of the Y spectral class, ever discovered and spectroscopically confirmed, including "archetypal member" of the Y spectral class – WISE 1828+2650. These seven objects are also the faintest seven of 98 brown dwarfs, presented in Kirkpatrick et al. (2011).

== Distance ==
Currently the most accurate distance estimate of WISE 1828+2650 is a trigonometric parallax, published in 2021 by Kirkpatrick et al.: 100.3±2.0 mas, corresponding to a distance of 10.0±0.2 pc, or 32.5±0.6 ly.

WISE 1828+2650 distance estimates
Source	Parallax (mas)	Distance (pc)	Distance (ly)	Ref
Kirkpatrick et al. (2011) (Table 6)	–	<9.4	<30.7	
Beichman et al. (2013) (according to Kirkpatrick et al. (2012))	122 ± 13	8.2^{+1.0}_{−0.8}	26.7^{+3.2}_{−2.6}	
Beichman et al. (2013)	90 ± 9.5 (Note: According to Dupuy & Kraus (2013), this measurement uncertainty is likely underestimated.)	11.2^{+1.3}_{−1.0}	36.5^{+4.2}_{−3.3}	
Dupuy & Kraus (2013)	70 ± 14 (Note: Relative parallax.)	14.3^{+3.6}_{−2.4}	46.6^{+11.6}_{−7.8}	
Beichman et al. (2014)	106 ± 7	9.4^{+0.7}_{−0.6}	30.8^{+2.2}_{−1.9}	
Kirkpatrick et al. (2021)	**100.3±2.0**	**10.0±0.2**	**32.5±0.6**	
Non-trigonometric distance estimates are marked in italic. The most precise estimate is marked in **bold**.

== Proper motion ==
WISE 1828+2650 has a proper motion of 1,030.5±1.1 milliarcseconds per year.

WISE 1828+2650 proper motion estimates
Source	μ mas/yr	P. A. °	μ_{RA} mas/yr	μ_{DEC} mas/yr	Ref
Kirkpatrick et al. (2011)	1084	84	1078 ± 327	118 ± 409	
Beichman et al. (2013)	966	81	954 ± 11	153 ± 12.5	
Dupuy & Kraus (2013)	1034 ± 15	80.4 ± 0.9	1020 ± 15	173 ± 16	
Beichman et al. (2014)	**1039**	**80.4**	**1024 ± 7**	**174 ± 6**	
The best estimate is marked in **bold**.

== Physical properties ==
Until the discovery of WISE 0855−0714 in 2014, WISE 1828+2650 was considered as the coldest currently known brown dwarf or the first example of free-floating planet (it is not currently known if it is a brown dwarf or a free-floating planet). It has a temperature in the range 250–400 K (−23–127 °C; −10–260 °F) and was initially estimated below 300 K, or about 27 °C (81 °F). It has been assigned the latest known spectral class (>Y2, initially estimated as >Y0).

The mass of WISE 1828+2650 is in the range 0.5–20 M_{Jup} for ages of 0.1–10 Gyr. The high tangential velocity of WISE 1828+2650, characteristic of an old disk population, indicates a possible age of WISE 1828+2650 in the range 2–4 Gyr, leading to a mass estimate of about 3–6 M_{Jup}. This suggests that WISE 1828+2650 may be a free-floating planet rather than a brown dwarf, since it is below the lower mass limit for deuterium fusion (~13 M_{Jup}).

WISE 1828+2650 is similar in appearance to the other Y-type object WD 0806-661 B. WD 0806-661 B could have formed as a planet close to its primary, WD 0806-661 A, and later, when the primary became a white dwarf and lost most of its mass, have migrated into a larger orbit of 2500 AU, and similarity between WD 0806-661 B and WISE 1828+2650 may indicate that WISE 1828+2650 had formed in the same way.

JWST observation with MIRI detected water vapor (H_{2}O), methane (CH_{4}) and ammonia (NH_{3}) in the atmosphere of WISE 1828+2650. The work detected a low amount of ammonia containing the ^{15}N isotope when compared to ammonia containing the ^{14}N isotope. The ^{14}NH_{3}-to-^{15}NH_{3} ratio was measured as 670. This amount of ^{15}NH_{3} is lower than in any Solar System body and it is an indication that WISE 1828+2650 has formed like a star and not like a planet. Thus, this provides evidence that the object is a (sub-)brown dwarf and not a free-floating planet. Another team used the NIRSpec instrument on JWST and detected water vapor, methane, ammonia, carbon monoxide (^{12}CO), carbon dioxide (CO_{2}) and hydrogen sulfide (H_{2}S). These molecules are the major carbon, nitrogen, oxygen, and sulfur bearing species in the atmosphere of WISE 1828+2650. The carbon-to-oxygen ratio (C/O ratio) is with 0.45±0.01 close to the solar ratio. The abundance of carbon, oxygen and sulfur is higher than the sun, but the abundance of nitrogen is likely similar to the sun.

Elemental Abundances of WISE 1828+2650
Normalized element abundance	Abundance ([M/H]=0 is solar)
[C/H]	+0.24+0.01 −0.02
[O/H]	≥ +0.34+0.01 −0.02
[N/H]	> −0.31±0.02, might be +0.04
[S/H]	+0.14±0.03

=== Possible binarity ===
Comparison between WISE 1828+2650 and WD 0806-661 B may suggest that WISE 1828+2650 is a system of two equal-mass objects. Observations with Hubble Space Telescope (HST) and Keck-II LGS-AO system had not revealed binarity, suggesting that if any such companion exists, it would have an orbit less than 0.5 AU, and no direct evidence for binarity yet exists. However, the spectrum of the system best fits a pair of brown dwarfs, each with an effective temperature of about 325 K and a mass of about 5 M_{J}.

JWST NIRCam imaging observations did not find a companion at a separation larger than 0.5 astronomical units. NIRSpec low resolution prism observations cannot be explained with existing Sonora Bobcat models of planetary objects, neither single nor multiple. The binary model fails to provide an improved fit for the existing photometric data. A newer analysis of the NIRSpec data compared radius determined with atmospheric retrieval framework CHIMERA and evolutionary model Sonora Bobcat. The CHIMERA radius for a single object (1.23±0.01 R_{J}) compared with predicted radius from Sonora Bobcat (10 Gyrs, 33 M_{J},0.87 R_{J}) is too large for its age, which might be an indication that WISE 1828+2650 is an equal mass binary with both objects having a radius of 0.87 R_{J}. The estimated semi-major axis of this binary is 0.0098+0.002
−0.006 astronomical units or 20+4
−12 R_{J}. Sonora Bobcat however predicts a lower age (1.4 Gyrs) and mass (9.982 M_{J}) when using the temperature and gravity from Sonora Elf Owl atmospheric model grid. Future observations could look for radial velocity variations to confirm the binary.

=== Comparison ===
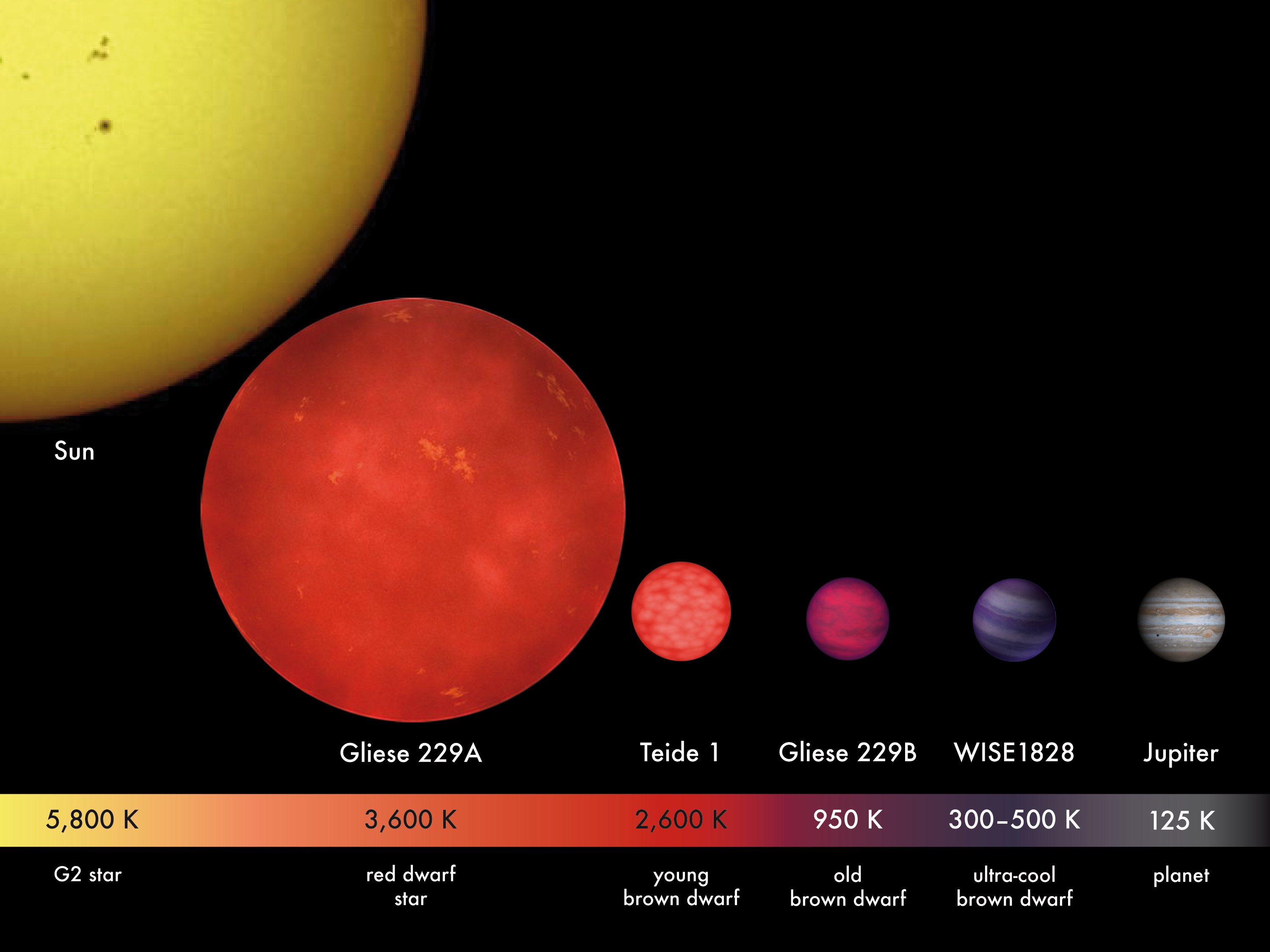
Brown dwarfs Teide 1, Gliese 229B, and WISE 1828+2650 compared to red dwarf Gliese 229A, Jupiter and the Sun

== See also ==
The other six discoveries of brown dwarfs, published by Cushing et al. in 2011:

- WISE 0148−7202 (T9.5)
- WISE 0410+1502 (Y0)
- WISE 1405+5534 (Y0 (pec?))
- WISE 1541−2250 (Y0.5)
- WISE 1738+2732 (Y0)
- WISE 2056+1459 (Y0)

Lists:

- List of star systems within 30–35 light-years
- List of Y-dwarfs
