= WISEPA J173835.53+273258.9 =

Brown dwarf star in the constellation Hercules

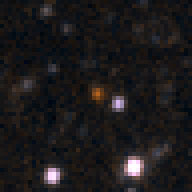
- WISE 1738+2732; Credit: unWISE

Observation data Epoch MJD 55451.22 Equinox J2000
- Constellation: Hercules
- Right ascension: 17^{h} 38^{m} 35.54^{s}
- Declination: 27° 32′ 58.78″

Characteristics
- Spectral type: Y0
- Apparent magnitude (J (MKO filter system)): 19.47 ± 0.08
- Apparent magnitude (H (MKO filter system)): 20.66 ± 0.38

Astrometry
Proper motion (μ)	RA: 36.08 ±0.20 mas/yr Dec.: –341.46 ±0.17 mas/yr
Parallax (π)	133.65±0.83 mas
Distance	24.4 ± 0.2 ly (7.48 ± 0.05 pc)

Details
Mass	13+11 −7 M_{Jup}
Radius	1.14±0.03 R_{Jup}
Luminosity	3.02+0.37 −0.27×10^{−7} L_{☉}
Surface gravity (log g)	4.46+0.26 −0.34 cgs
Temperature	402+12 −9 K
Rotation	6.01±0.07 hours
Age	1–4 Gyr

Other designations
- WISEPA J173835.53+273258.9; WISEP J1738+2732; WISE J1738+2732; WISE 1738+2732

Database references
SIMBAD	data

WISEPA J173835.53+273258.9 (abbreviated WISE 1738+2732) is a brown dwarf of spectral class Y0, located in the constellation Hercules at 24.9 light-years from Earth. It is the nearest celestial object in Hercules.

== History of observations ==
WISE 1738+2732 was discovered in 2011 from data, collected by the Wide-field Infrared Survey Explorer (WISE) Earth-orbiting satellite—NASA infrared-wavelength 40 cm (16 in) space telescope, which mission lasted from December 2009 to February 2011. WISE 1738+2732 has two discovery papers: Kirkpatrick et al. (2011) and Cushing et al. (2011), however, basically with the same authors and published nearly simultaneously.

- Kirkpatrick et al. presented discovery of 98 new found by WISE brown dwarf systems with components of spectral types M, L, T and Y, among which also was WISE 1738+2732. (Note: These 98 brown dwarf systems are only among first, not all brown dwarf systems, discovered from data, collected by WISE: six discoveries were published earlier (however, also listed in Kirkpatrick et al. (2011)) in Mainzer et al. (2011) and Burgasser et al. (2011), and the other discoveries were published later.)
- Cushing et al. presented discovery of seven brown dwarfs—one of T9.5 type, and six of Y-type—first members of the Y spectral class, ever discovered and spectroscopically confirmed, including "archetypal member" of the Y spectral class WISE 1828+2650, and WISE 1738+2732. These seven objects are also the faintest seven of 98 brown dwarfs, presented in Kirkpatrick et al. (2011).

Currently the most accurate distance estimate of WISE 1738+2732 is a trigonometric parallax, published in 2021 by Kirkpatrick et al.: 130.9±2.1 mas, corresponding to a distance of 7.6±0.1 pc, or 24.9±0.4 ly. WISE 1738+2732 has a proper motion of 481.2±1.1 milliarcseconds per year.

== Properties ==
The object's temperature estimate is 350 (350–400) K. Its spectrum is similar to the spectrum of another Y-dwarf, WISE 1405+5534.

Disequilibrium chemistry models suggest that this Y-dwarf has a low mass of about 3–9 M_{Jup}, making it a possible isolated planetary-mass object, together with WISE 0350-5658. A more recent paper finds a mass of 5–14 M_{Jup}.

WISE 1405 is variable in the near- and mid-infrared. The observations were made with the Gemini Observatory and Spitzer. It has a rotation period of 6.0 ± 0.1 hours and the amplitude is 3% for 4.5 μm and may be as high as 5–30% in the near-infrared. This dependence on wavelength can be reproduced with patchy cloud layers made up of potassium chloride (KCl) and sodium sulfide (Na_{2}S).

== See also ==
- List of star systems within 20–25 light-years
- List of Y-dwarfs
- WISE 0148-7202 (T9.5)
- WISE 0410+1502 (Y0)
- WISE 1405+5534 (Y0 (pec?))
- WISE 1541-2250 (Y0.5)
- WISE 1828+2650 (≥Y2)
- WISE 2056+1459 (Y0)
