= HD 195019 =

Binary star in the constellation Delphinus

Observation data Epoch J2000 Equinox ICRS
- Constellation: Delphinus
- A
- Right ascension: 20^{h} 28^{m} 18.6367^{s}
- Declination: +18° 46′ 10.180″
- Apparent magnitude (V): 6.97
- B
- Right ascension: 20^{h} 28^{m} 18.5185^{s}
- Declination: +18° 46′ 13.365″
- Apparent magnitude (V): 10.60

Characteristics
- Spectral type: G1V + K3:
- B−V color index: 0.662±0.007

Astrometry
| Absolute magnitude (M_{V}) | +4.01 |

A
| Radial velocity (R_{v}) | −91.290±0.0039 km/s |
| Proper motion (μ) | RA: +349.620(16) mas/yr Dec.: −56.618(19) mas/yr |
| Parallax (π) | 26.6465±0.0225 mas |
| Distance | 122.4 ± 0.1 ly (37.53 ± 0.03 pc) |

B
| Proper motion (μ) | RA: +361.063(18) mas/yr Dec.: −65.735(23) mas/yr |
| Parallax (π) | 26.6192±0.0251 mas |
| Distance | 122.5 ± 0.1 ly (37.57 ± 0.04 pc) |

Details

HD 195019 A
| Mass | 1.08±0.01 M_{☉} |
| Radius | 1.47±0.04 R_{☉} |
| Luminosity | 2.23±0.02 L_{☉} |
| Surface gravity (log g) | 4.13±0.02 cgs |
| Temperature | 5,825±56 K |
| Metallicity [Fe/H] | 0.068±0.030 dex |
| Rotation | 25 days |
| Rotational velocity (v sin i) | 2.47±0.50 km/s |
| Age | 7.7±0.7 Gyr |

HD 195019 B
| Mass | 0.7 M_{☉} |
| Radius | 0.62 R_{☉} |
| Luminosity | 0.10 L_{☉} |
| Surface gravity (log g) | 4.46 cgs |
| Temperature | 4,652 K |
| Rotational velocity (v sin i) | 1.71 km/s |

Other designations
- BD+18°4505, HD 195019, HIP 100970, SAO 106138, WDS J20283+1846, LTT 15981, NLTT 49312, GCRV 12790, 2MASS J20281860+1846103

Database references
| SIMBAD | data |

HD 195019 is a binary star system in the northern constellation of Delphinus. The brighter star has a close orbiting exoplanet companion. This system is located at a distance of 122 light years from the Sun based on parallax measurements, but it is drifting closer with a radial velocity of −91.3 km/s. Although it has an absolute magnitude of 4.01, at that distance the system is considered too faint to be viewed with the naked eye, having a combined apparent visual magnitude of 6.87. However, it should be readily visible with a pair of binoculars or a small telescope.

The spectrum of the primary member, designated component A, presents as a G-type main-sequence star with a stellar classification of G1V. An older stellar classification of G3 V/IV suggested it may be near the end of its main sequence lifespan and is evolving into a subgiant star. This is an older star with an estimated age of nearly 8 billion years and a low level of magnetic activity in its chromosphere. The abundance of iron is near solar. The star has a mass similar to the Sun but a larger radius. It is radiating 2.23 times the luminosity of the Sun from its photosphere at an effective temperature of 5,825 K.

The co-moving companion, component B, was first reported by G. W. Hough in 1881. As of 2016, it is located at an angular separation of 3.40″ along a position angle of 334° relative to the primary. This corresponds to a projected separation of 131 AU. This is a K-type star with 70% of the mass of the Sun and is magnitude 10.60.

== Planetary system ==
In 1998, a planet was discovered at Lick Observatory utilizing a radial velocity method, orbiting around Star HD 195019 A. A search of astrometric observations from Hipparcos suggested this may be a stellar object in a near polar orbit. However, interferometric observations ruled out a stellar companion in this orbit with high likelihood.

The HD 195019 planetary system
| Companion (in order from star) | Mass | Semimajor axis (AU) | Orbital period (days) | Eccentricity | Inclination (°) | Radius |
|---|---|---|---|---|---|---|
| b | >3.69 ± 0.30 M_{J} | 0.1388 ± 0.0080 | 18.20132 ± 0.00039 | 0.0138 ± 0.0044 | — | — |

== See also ==
- HD 190228
- HD 196050
- List of exoplanets discovered before 2000 - HD 195019 b
