= WASP-2 =

Multiple star system in the constellation Delphinus

Observation data Epoch J2000.0 Equinox ICRS
- Constellation: Delphinus
- A
- Right ascension: 20^{h} 30^{m} 54.1282^{s}
- Declination: +06° 25′ 46.341″
- Apparent magnitude (V): +11.98

Characteristics
- Spectral type: K1.5V + K2-M3
- Apparent magnitude (J): 10.166±0.027
- Apparent magnitude (H): 9.752±0.026
- Apparent magnitude (K): 9.632±0.024
- Variable type: planetary transit

Astrometry
Radial velocity (R_{v})	−27.70±0.46 km/s
Proper motion (μ)	RA: 5.631 mas/yr Dec.: −48.491 mas/yr
Parallax (π)	6.5777±0.0270 mas
Distance	496 ± 2 ly (152.0 ± 0.6 pc)

Orbit
Period (P)	5900+1600 −2400 yr
Semi-major axis (a)	350+68 −89 au
Eccentricity (e)	0.936+0.021 −0.015
Inclination (i)	40.9+10.7 −8.4°
Longitude of the node (Ω)	275+4 −5°
Periastron epoch (T)	340,992+857,392 −581,608 BJD
Argument of periastron (ω) (secondary)	322±4°

Details

WASP-2A
Mass	0.859+0.029 −0.030 M_{☉}
Radius	0.821±0.013 R_{☉}
Luminosity	0.507+0.023 −0.029 L_{☉}
Surface gravity (log g)	4.536±0.015 cgs
Temperature	5170±60 K
Metallicity [Fe/H]	0.1±0.2 dex
Rotational velocity (v sin i)	0.9±0.5 km/s
Age	7.6+2.5 −3.3 Gyr

WASP-2B
Mass	0.372±0.010 M_{☉}
Temperature	3523+28 −19 K

Other designations
- V357 Del, TOI-5797, TIC 374530847, WASP-2, GSC 00522-01199, 2MASS J20305413+0625463, 1SWASP J203054.12+062546.4, USNO-B1.0 0964-00543604, UCAC2 34018636

Database references
SIMBAD	A
- B
Exoplanet Archive	data

WASP-2 is a binary star system located about 496 light-years away in the constellation Delphinus. The primary is a magnitude 12 orange dwarf star, orbited by a red dwarf star on a wide orbit. The star system shows an infrared excess noise of unknown origin.

The primary star hosts one known exoplanet, WASP-2b. Since the planet transits the star, the star is classified as a planetary transit variable and has received the variable star designation V357 Delphini.

== Binary star ==
In 2008 a study was undertaken of fourteen stars with exoplanets that were originally discovered using the transit method through relatively small telescopes. These systems were re-examined with the 2.2 m (87 in) reflector telescope at the Calar Alto Observatory in Spain. This star system, along with two others, was determined to be a previously unknown binary star system. The previously unknown secondary star is a dim magnitude 15 M-type star separated by about 111 AU from the primary, appearing offset from the primary by about one arc second in the images. This discovery resulted in a recalculation of parameters for both the planet and the primary star.

A re-examination of the WASP-2 spectrum in 2015 resulted in the measurement of the stellar companion's temperature as 3513±28 K, and an angular separation of 0.73 arcseconds.

== Planetary system ==
The primary star has one exoplanet, WASP-2b, a hot Jupiter detected by the SuperWASP project in 2006 using the transit method.

The WASP-2 planetary system
Companion (in order from star)	Mass	Semimajor axis (AU)	Orbital period (days)	Eccentricity	Inclination (°)	Radius
b	0.892±0.027 M_{J}	0.0308±0.0004	2.15222163(42)	<0.013	84.81+0.35 −0.27	1.060±0.024 R_{J}

== See also ==
- WASP-1
