= HD 193373 =

Star in the constellation of Delphinus

Observation data Epoch J2000.0 Equinox ICRS
- Constellation: Delphinus
- Right ascension: 20^{h} 19^{m} 29.2960^{s}
- Declination: +13° 13′ 00.357″
- Apparent magnitude (V): 6.21

Characteristics
- Evolutionary stage: AGB
- Spectral type: M1 III
- B−V color index: +1.63

Astrometry
Radial velocity (R_{v})	22.68±0.13 km/s
Proper motion (μ)	RA: −15.865 mas/yr Dec.: −18.581 mas/yr
Parallax (π)	3.8556±0.0442 mas
Distance	846 ± 10 ly (259 ± 3 pc)
Absolute magnitude (M_{V})	−0.46

Details
Mass	1.77 M_{☉}
Radius	57.5 R_{☉}
Luminosity	592±16 L_{☉}
Surface gravity (log g)	0.89 cgs
Temperature	3,884±122 K
Metallicity [Fe/H]	+0.08 dex

Other designations
- AG+13°2092, BD+12°4289, HD 193373, HIP 100208, HR 7771, SAO 105961

Database references
SIMBAD	data

HD 193373 (HR 7771) is a solitary red hued star located in the equatorial constellation Delphinus. It has an apparent magnitude of 6.21, placing it near the limit for naked eye visibility. Parallax measurements place it 846 light years distant and it is currently receding with a heliocentric radial velocity of 22.7 km/s.

This is an asymptotic giant branch star with a stellar classification of M1 III. In its current state, the object is fusing hydrogen and helium shells around an inert carbon core. HR 7771 has 177% the mass of the Sun but has expanded to an enlarged radius of 57.5 R_{☉}. It radiates at 592 times the luminosity of the Sun from its photosphere at an effective temperature of 3,884 K, giving a red hue. HD 193373 has an iron abundance 120% that of the Sun, making it slightly metal enriched.
