= HD 200044 =

M-type star in the constellation Delphinus

Observation data Epoch J2000.0 Equinox J2000.0 (ICRS)
- Constellation: Delphinus
- Right ascension: 21^{h} 00^{m} 27.6883^{s}
- Declination: +19° 19′ 46.493″
- Apparent magnitude (V): 5.70±0.01

Characteristics
- Evolutionary stage: AGB
- Spectral type: M3 IIIab
- B−V color index: +1.61
- Variable type: suspected

Astrometry
Radial velocity (R_{v})	−15.07±0.09 km/s
Proper motion (μ)	RA: −15.483 mas/yr Dec.: −59.705 mas/yr
Parallax (π)	5.455±0.0753 mas
Distance	598 ± 8 ly (183 ± 3 pc)
Absolute magnitude (M_{V})	−0.33

Details
Mass	1.32 M_{☉}
Radius	58 R_{☉}
Luminosity	507 L_{☉}
Surface gravity (log g)	1.11 cgs
Temperature	3,707 K
Age	13.5 Gyr

Other designations
- AG+19°2128, BD+18°4675, GC 29329, HD 200044, HIP 103675, HR 8044, SAO 106747, WDS J21005+1920A

Database references
SIMBAD	data

HD 200044 (HR 8044) is a solitary star in the equatorial constellation Delphinus. It has an apparent magnitude of 5.7, allowing it to be faintly seen with the naked eye. The object is located 598 light years away, but is approaching the Solar System with a heliocentric radial velocity of −15.07 km/s.

HD 200044 has a spectral classification of M3 IIIab, indicating that its an ageing red giant. It is currently on the asymptotic giant branch and is fusing hydrogen and helium in shells around an inert carbon core. As a consequence, it has expanded to 58 times the radius of the Sun and is now radiating with a luminosity over 500 times greater than that of the Sun. HD 200044's large size and high luminosity yield an effective temperature of 3,707 K, giving it a red glow. HD 200044 is suspected to be a variable star with an amplitude of 0.05 magnitudes.

There is a 10th magnitude optical companion separated 49.3″ away and at a position angle of 337° as of 2014. It has a much smaller parallax (ie. greater distance) than HD 20044 and the separation of the two stars is increasing due to HD 200044's high proper motion.
