= WASP-2b =

Extrasolar planet in the constellation Delphinus

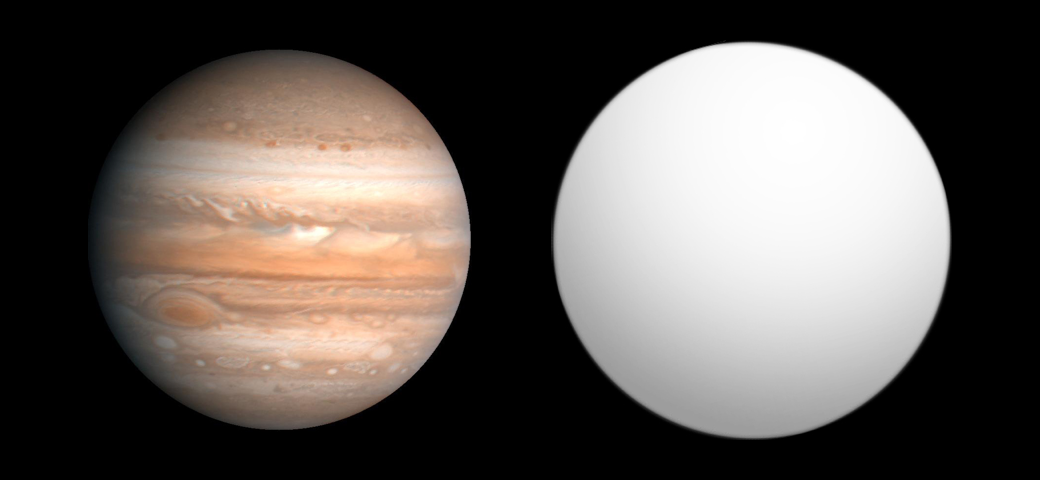
- Size comparison of WASP-2b with Jupiter.

Discovery
- Discovered by: Cameron et al. (SuperWASP)
- Discovery site: SAAO
- Discovery date: September 25, 2006
- Detection method: Transit

Orbital characteristics
- Semi-major axis: 0.0308 ^{+0.0004}_{−0.0002} AU
- Eccentricity: <0.013
- Orbital period (sidereal): 2.15222216 ± 0.00000013 d
- Inclination: 84.81 ± 0.17°
- Time of periastron: 2,456,031.78981±0.000075
- Argument of periastron: 267+11 −86
- Semi-amplitude: 156.5±13 m/s
- Star: WASP-2 A

Physical characteristics
- Mean radius: 1.060+0.024 −0.008 R_{J}
- Mass: 0.892+0.027 −0.013 M_{J}
- Mean density: 0.701+0.041 −0.005 g cm^{−3}
- Surface gravity: 3.279 ± 0.036 g
- Temperature: 1286 ± 17 K

WASP-2b is an extrasolar planet orbiting the star WASP-2 located about 500 light years away in the constellation of Delphinus. It was discovered via the transit method, and then follow up measurements using the radial velocity method confirmed that WASP-2b was a planet. The planet's mass and radius indicate that it is a gas giant with a similar bulk composition to Jupiter. Unlike Jupiter, but similar to many other planets detected around other stars, WASP-2b is located very close to its star, and belongs to the class of planets known as hot Jupiters. A 2008 study concluded that the WASP-2b system (among others) is a binary star system allowing even more accurate determination of stellar and planetary parameters.

== See also ==
- HD 209458 b
- WASP-1b
- SuperWASP
