= HD 199223 =

Double star in the constellation Delphinus

- Location of HD 199223 (circled)

Observation data Epoch J2000 Equinox J2000
Constellation	Delphinus
- A
Right ascension	20^{h} 55^{m} 40.6778^{s}
Declination	+04° 31′ 57.799″
- Apparent magnitude (V): 6.34±0.01
- B
Right ascension	20^{h} 55^{m} 40.5439^{s}
Declination	+04° 31′ 58.227″
- Apparent magnitude (V): 7.49±0.01

Characteristics

A
- Evolutionary stage: red giant branch
- Spectral type: G8 III/IV
- U−B color index: +0.49
- B−V color index: +0.82

B
- Spectral type: F/G

Astrometry
Radial velocity (R_{v})	−32.6±0.4 km/s
Absolute magnitude (M_{V})	+0.33

A
Proper motion (μ)	RA: +60.413 mas/yr Dec.: +10.949 mas/yr
Parallax (π)	9.2067±0.0354 mas
Distance	354 ± 1 ly (108.6 ± 0.4 pc)

B
Proper motion (μ)	RA: +60.315 mas/yr Dec.: +9.758 mas/yr
Parallax (π)	9.0757±0.0758 mas
Distance	359 ± 3 ly (110.2 ± 0.9 pc)

Details

A
Mass	1.63 M_{☉}
Radius	7.71 R_{☉}
Luminosity	36.5 L_{☉}
Surface gravity (log g)	2.75 cgs
Temperature	4,830 K
Metallicity [Fe/H]	0.16 dex
Rotational velocity (v sin i)	<1 km/s
Age	557 Myr

B
Mass	1.36 M_{☉}
Radius	2.32 R_{☉}
Luminosity	9.04 L_{☉}
Surface gravity (log g)	3.84 cgs
Temperature	6,572 K
Metallicity [Fe/H]	−0.2 dex

Other designations
- 1 G. Equulei, AG+04°2834, BD+03°4461, GC 29200, HD 199223, HIP 103301, HR 8010, SAO 126373, WDS J20557+0432

Database references
SIMBAD	The system
- A
- B

HD 199223 (HR 8010) is a double star in the equatorial constellation Delphinus. However, the system was originally in Equuleus prior to the creation of official IAU constellation borders. The components have a separation of 2″ at a position angle of 282° as of 2016. They have apparent magnitudes of 6.34 and 7.49 and distances of 354 and 359 light years respectively. The system is drifting closer with a radial velocity of −33 km/s.

The brighter component has a stellar classification of G8 III/IV, indicating that it is a G-type star with the blended luminosity class of a giant star and a subgiant. It has 163% of the mass of the Sun and an enlarged radius of 7.71 R_{☉}. It shines at 36.5 times the luminosity of the Sun from its photosphere at an effective temperature of 4,830 K, giving it a yellow glow. HD 199223A's iron abundance is 135% that of the Sun and it spins modestly with a projected rotational velocity less than 1 km/s.

As for the dimmer one, it is classified as an F/G star, and is calculated to be an F-type subgiant. It has 136% of the mass of the Sun and 2.3 times its radius. It radiates with a luminosity of 9.04 L_{☉} from its photosphere at an effective temperature of 6,572 K, giving it a yellow white glow.
