= HD 193472 =

Am star in the constellation Delphinus

Observation data Epoch J2000.0 Equinox J2000.0 (ICRS)
- Constellation: Delphinus
- Right ascension: 20^{h} 20^{m} 00.1887^{s}
- Declination: +13° 32′ 53.118″
- Apparent magnitude (V): 5.94±0.01

Characteristics
- Evolutionary stage: main sequence
- Spectral type: kA4hF0mF
- U−B color index: +0.12
- B−V color index: +0.28

Astrometry
Radial velocity (R_{v})	−8.00±1.78 km/s
Proper motion (μ)	RA: −3.900 mas/yr Dec.: −5.007 mas/yr
Parallax (π)	11.5644±0.0547 mas
Distance	282 ± 1 ly (86.5 ± 0.4 pc)
Absolute magnitude (M_{V})	+1.44

Details
Mass	1.61±0.25 M_{☉}
Radius	3.15±0.11 R_{☉}
Luminosity	23.9±0.9 L_{☉}
Surface gravity (log g)	3.65±0.08 cgs
Temperature	7,188±114 K
Metallicity [Fe/H]	+0.43±0.20 dex
Rotational velocity (v sin i)	105 km/s
Age	1.02+0.18 −0.16 Gyr

Other designations
- AG+13°2095, BD+13°4360, GC 28275, HD 193472, HIP 100256, HR 7774, SAO 105974

Database references
SIMBAD	data

HD 193472 (HR 7774) is a solitary star in the equatorial constellation Delphinus. It has an apparent magnitude of 5.94, making it visible with the naked eye if viewed under ideal conditions. Parallax measurements put it at a distance of 282 light years and has a radial velocity of −8 km/s, indicating that the object drifting towards the Solar System.

HD 193472 has a stellar classification of kA4hF0mF, indicating that its an Am star with the calcium K-line of an A4 star, the hydrogen lines and effective temperature of a F0 star, and the metallic lines of a F2 star. Due to a radius over three times that of the Sun and a relatively low surface gravity, it appears to be slightly evolved. HD 193472 has 161% the mass of the Sun and shines at 24 times the luminosity of the Sun from its photosphere at an effective temperature of 7,188 K, giving it a yellowish white glow. HD 193472 has a projected rotational velocity of 105 km/s.
