= HD 194937 =

G-type giant star in Delphinus

- Location of HD 194937 on the map (circled)

Observation data Epoch J2000.0 Equinox ICRS
- Constellation: Delphinus
- Right ascension: 20^{h} 28^{m} 07.53959^{s}
- Declination: +08° 26′ 14.8132″
- Apparent magnitude (V): 6.23±0.01

Characteristics
- Evolutionary stage: red giant branch
- Spectral type: G9 III
- U−B color index: +0.92
- B−V color index: +1.08

Astrometry
Radial velocity (R_{v})	−10.8±0.3 km/s
Proper motion (μ)	RA: +40.673 mas/yr Dec.: +16.897 mas/yr
Parallax (π)	8.874±0.0216 mas
Distance	367.5 ± 0.9 ly (112.7 ± 0.3 pc)
Absolute magnitude (M_{V})	+1.36

Details
Mass	1.51 M_{☉}
Radius	9.68±0.49 R_{☉}
Luminosity	52.6±0.2 L_{☉}
Surface gravity (log g)	2.67±0.02 cgs
Temperature	4,786 K
Metallicity [Fe/H]	−0.03 dex
Rotational velocity (v sin i)	1.8 km/s
Age	2.88 Gyr

Other designations
- 7 G. Delphini, AG+08°2789, BD+07°4477, FK5 3638, GC 28466, HD 194937, HIP 100953, HR 7820, SAO 125841

Database references
SIMBAD	data

HD 194937 (HR 7820; 7 G. Delphini) is a star located in the equatorial constellation Delphinus, the dolphin. It has an apparent magnitude of 6.23, making it barely visible to the naked eye even under ideal conditions. Gaia DR3 parallax measurements imply a distance of 367.5 light years and it is currently drifting closer with a heliocentric radial velocity of −10.8 km/s. At its current distance, HD 194937's brightness is diminished by an interstellar extinction of 0.24 magnitudes.

HD 194937 has a stellar classification of G9 III, indicating that it is an evolved G-type giant star that has ceased hydrogen fusion at its core and left the main sequence. The object has 1.51 times the mass of the Sun but at the age of 2.88 billion years, it has expanded to 9.68 times the radius of the Sun. It radiates 52.6 times the Sun's luminosity from its enlarged photosphere at an effective temperature of 4,786 K, giving the star an orange hue when it is viewed in the night sky. HD 194937 is slightly metal deficient with an iron abundance 93.3% of the Sun's and it spins slowly with a projected rotational velocity of 1.8 km/s.
