= WASP-1 =

Star in the constellation Andromeda

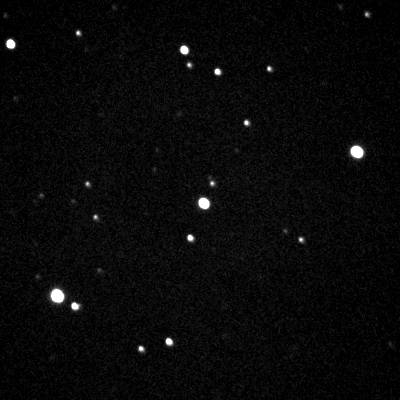
- Telescope photo of WASP-1

Observation data Epoch J2000 Equinox ICRS
- Constellation: Andromeda
- Right ascension: 00^{h} 20^{m} 40.0746^{s}
- Declination: +31° 59′ 23.955″
- Apparent magnitude (V): 11.68 ± 0.05

Characteristics

WASP-1A
- Evolutionary stage: main sequence
- Spectral type: F7V
- Apparent magnitude (B): ~12.0
- Apparent magnitude (V): 11.68±0.05

WASP-1B
- Apparent magnitude (H): 15.130±0.046
- Apparent magnitude (K): 15.116±0.055

Astrometry

WASP-1A
Radial velocity (R_{v})	−13.90(59) km/s
Proper motion (μ)	RA: −4.692(22) mas/yr Dec.: −3.320(20) mas/yr
Parallax (π)	2.6108±0.0218 mas
Distance	1,250 ± 10 ly (383 ± 3 pc)
Absolute magnitude (M_{V})	3.63+0.13 −0.14

Details

WASP-1A
Mass	1.301+0.049 −0.047 M_{☉}
Radius	1.515+0.052 −0.045 R_{☉}
Luminosity	2.88+0.36 −0.30 L_{☉}
Surface gravity (log g)	4.190+0.020 −0.022 cgs
Temperature	6110±75 K
Metallicity [Fe/H]	0.26±0.08 dex
Age	3.0±0.6 Gyr

WASP-1B
Mass	~0.3 M_{☉}
Surface gravity (log g)	~4.97 cgs
Temperature	~3400 K

Position (relative to WASP-1A)
Component	WASP-1B
Epoch of observation	2013–2014
Angular distance	~4.58″
Position angle	~1.9°
Projected separation	1587+160 −16 AU

Other designations
- 1SWASP J002040.07+315923.7, USNO-B1.0 1219-00005465, TOI-6014, TIC 57984377, WASP-1, TYC 2265-107-1, GSC 02265-00107, 2MASS J00204007+3159239

Database references
SIMBAD	data
Exoplanet Archive	data

WASP-1 is a magnitude 12 binary star system located about 1,250 light-years away in the constellation Andromeda. The binary system consists of a metal-rich F-type main-sequence star, named WASP-1A, and a distant low-mass star, named WASP-1B. WASP-1A has one known transiting hot Jupiter exoplanet named WASP-1b.

== Stellar companion ==
WASP-1A has a distant companion star, named WASP-1B. WASP-1B is a low-mass star that is around 0.3 times as massive as the Sun and has an effective temperature of about 3400 K. WASP-1B is located northward of WASP-1A at an angular separation of about 4.6 arcseconds, corresponding to a projected distance of 1587 AU. WASP-1B was first identified in observations from 2006 and confirmed in further observations from 2012 to 2014, which showed that it shares the proper motion of WASP-1A, indicating the two stars are gravitationally bound to each other.

== Planetary system ==
In 2006, an extrasolar planet was discovered by the Wide Angle Search for Planets team using the transit method. The planet has a density of 0.31 to 0.40 g/cm^{3}, making it about half as dense as Saturn, and one third as dense as water. The orbit of WASP-1b is inclined to the rotational axis of the star by 79.0^{+4.3}_{−4.5} degrees, making it a nearly "polar" orbit.

Two searches for additional planets using transit-timing variations have yielded negative results.

The WASP-1 planetary system
Companion (in order from star)	Mass	Semimajor axis (AU)	Orbital period (days)	Eccentricity	Inclination (°)	Radius
b	0.948+0.029 −0.028 M_{J}	0.03958+0.00047 −0.00049	2.51994480±0.00000050	<0.013	90.0+0.0 −2.9	1.514+0.052 −0.047 R_{J}

== See also ==
- SuperWASP
- List of extrasolar planets
