= HD 194688 =

K-type star in the constellation Delphinus

- Location of HD 194688 on the map (circled)

Observation data Epoch J2000.0 Equinox ICRS
- Constellation: Delphinus
- Right ascension: 20^{h} 26^{m} 23.15478^{s}
- Declination: +17° 18′ 56.0140″
- Apparent magnitude (V): 6.22±0.01

Characteristics
- Evolutionary stage: red giant branch
- Spectral type: K0III
- B−V color index: +1.01

Astrometry
Radial velocity (R_{v})	−17.12±0.27 km/s
Proper motion (μ)	RA: +5.397 mas/yr Dec.: −5.426 mas/yr
Parallax (π)	3.6827±0.0184 mas
Distance	886 ± 4 ly (272 ± 1 pc)
Absolute magnitude (M_{V})	−1.19

Details
Mass	1.57 M_{☉}
Radius	21.58 R_{☉}
Luminosity	258^{+3}_{−2} L_{☉}
Surface gravity (log g)	1.91 cgs
Temperature	4,995±122 K
Metallicity [Fe/H]	−0.13 dex

Other designations
- AG+17°2201, BD+16°4259, FK5 3635, GC 28435, HD 194688, HIP 100807, HR 7816, SAO 106101, TIC 305526917

Database references
SIMBAD	data

HD 194688, also designated as HR 7816, is a solitary star located in the northern constellation Delphinus, the dolphin. It has an apparent magnitude of 6.22, placing it near the limit for naked eye visibility. The object is located relatively far away at a distance of 886 light-years based on Gaia DR3 parallax measurements, but it is drifting closer with a heliocentric radial velocity of −17.12 km/s. At its current distance, HD 196488's brightness is diminished due to an interstellar extinction of 0.17 magnitudes and it has an absolute visual magnitude of −1.19.

HD 194688 has a simple stellar classification of K0III, indicating that it is an early K-type star. It has 1.57 times the mass of the Sun and an enlarged radius 21.58 times that of the Sun. It radiates 258 times the luminosity of the Sun from its photosphere at an effective temperature of 4,995 K, giving it an orangish-yellow hue when viewed in the night sky. The large radius and high luminosity suggests that HD 194688 may be an evolved giant star. It is slightly metal-deficient with an iron abundance 74.1% that of the Sun's.
