= HD 196885 =

Multiple star system in the constellation Delphinus

- Location of HD 196885 (circled in red)

Observation data Epoch J2000 Equinox ICRS
- Constellation: Delphinus
- Right ascension: 20^{h} 39^{m} 51.87484^{s}
- Declination: +11° 14′ 58.7002″
- Apparent magnitude (V): 6.39

Characteristics
- Evolutionary stage: main sequence
- Spectral type: F8V + M1±1V
- B−V color index: 0.559±0.006

Astrometry
Radial velocity (R_{v})	−30.13±0.09 km/s
Proper motion (μ)	RA: +71.915 mas/yr Dec.: +89.318 mas/yr
Parallax (π)	29.4076±0.0272 mas
Distance	110.9 ± 0.1 ly (34.00 ± 0.03 pc)
Absolute magnitude (M_{V})	3.76

Orbit
Primary	HD 196885 A
Secondary	HD 196886 B
Period (P)	69.045+0.533 −0.111 yr
Semi-major axis (a)	19.778+0.108 −0.019 AU
Eccentricity (e)	0.417+0.001 −0.004
Inclination (i)	120.427°
Longitude of the node (Ω)	79.150°
Periastron epoch (T)	1982.886 AD
Argument of periastron (ω) (secondary)	231.464°

Details

A
Mass	1.3±0.1 M_{☉}
Radius	1.38±0.01 R_{☉}
Luminosity	2.611±0.007 L_{☉}
Surface gravity (log g)	4.28±0.03 cgs
Temperature	6,267+18 −16 K
Metallicity [Fe/H]	+0.29±0.05 dex
Rotation	15 days
Rotational velocity (v sin i)	7.3±1.5 km/s
Age	1.5—3.5 Gyr

B
Mass	0.45±0.01 M_{☉}
Radius	0.57±0.04 R_{☉}
Surface gravity (log g)	4.58±0.06 cgs
Temperature	3,549+121 −124 K

Other designations
- BD+10°4351, GC 28784, HD 196885, HIP 101966, HR 7907, SAO 106360, WDS J20399+1115, GCRV 12946, GSC 01092-01778, 2MASS J20395188+1114588

Database references
SIMBAD	data
Exoplanet Archive	data

HD 196885 is a binary star system in the northern constellation of Delphinus. It comprises a pair of stars, HD 196885 A and HD 196885 B, on a 69-year eccentric orbit. The primary star has one known planet.

== Stellar properties ==
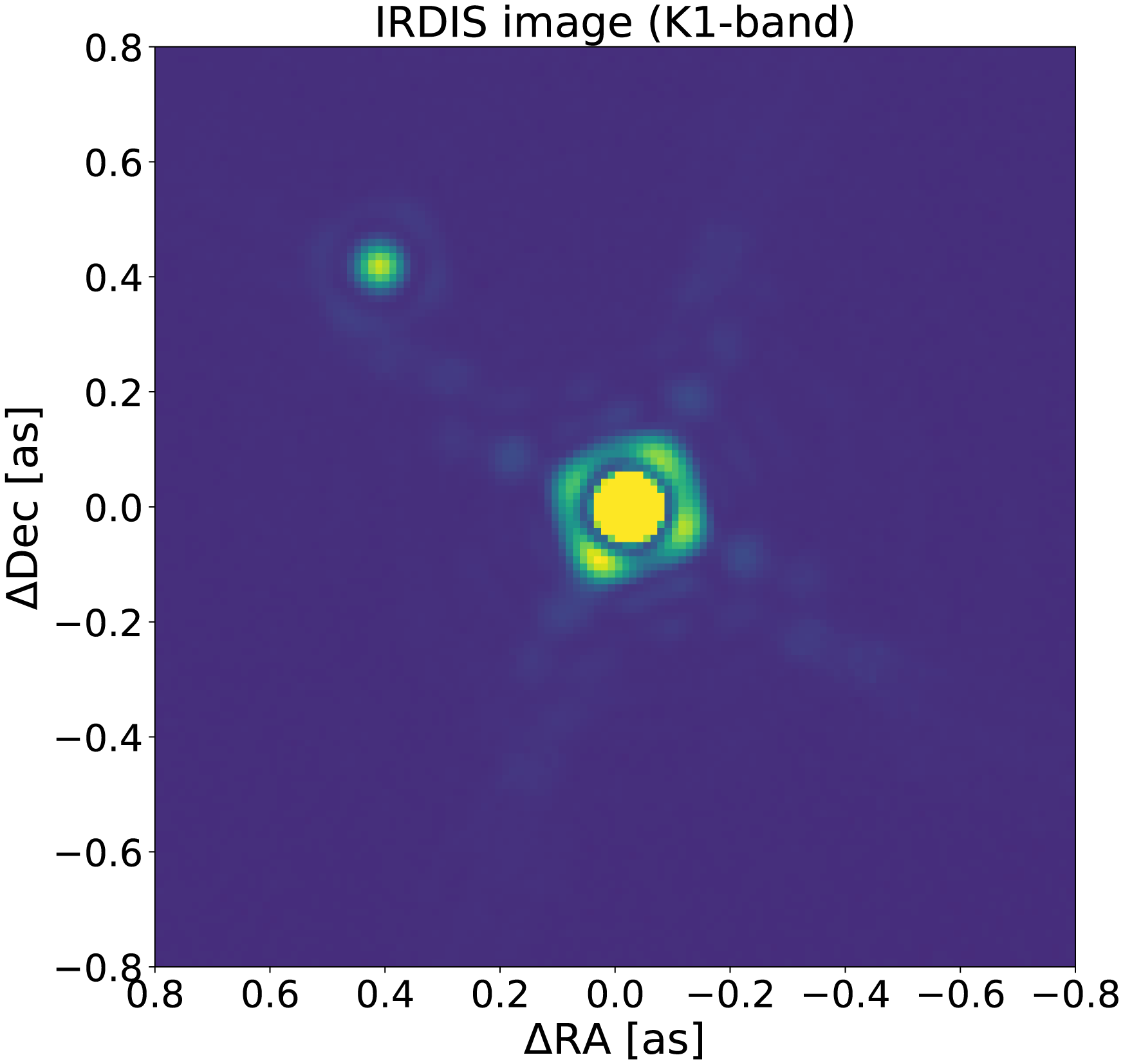
HD 196885 A (center) and B (top left) imaged by SPHERE

The primary star is near the lower limit of visibility to the naked eye with an apparent visual magnitude of 6.39. It is located at a distance of 110.9 light-years from the Sun. It is drifting closer with a radial velocity of −30 km/s, and is expected to come to within 52.5 light-years in 836,000 years.

The secondary, component B, is a red dwarf star separated by 0.6 arcseconds from the primary star that was discovered in 2006 with NaCo at VLT. It has a class in the range M1V to M3V with 51% of the Sun's mass.

The star BD+10 4351B, located 192 arcseconds away from HD 196885, was once thought to be a possible third component of the system, but Gaia astrometry shows a smaller parallax, indicating that it is an unrelated background star.

== Planetary system ==
In 2004, an exoplanet, HD 196885 Ab, was announced to be orbiting the star HD 196885 A in a 386-day orbit. Follow-up work published in 2008 did not confirm the original candidate but instead found evidence of a planet in a 3.63 years orbit. Perturbation by the secondary star in this system may have driven the planet into a high inclination orbit. The planetary existence was confirmed and parameters were refined by 2022.

The HD 196885 planetary system
Companion (in order from star)	Mass	Semimajor axis (AU)	Orbital period (years)	Eccentricity	Inclination (°)	Radius
b	3.394+0.702 −0.264 M_{J}	2.383+0.002 −0.004	3.485+0.001 −0.016	0.444+0.013 −0.005	143.041+6.572 −4.582	—

== See also ==
- Epsilon Reticuli
- GJ 3021
