= HD 194953 =

High proper motion star

Observation data Epoch J2000.0 Equinox J2000.0 (ICRS)
- Constellation: Delphinus
- Right ascension: 20^{h} 28^{m} 16.7824^{s}
- Declination: +02° 56′ 14.030″
- Apparent magnitude (V): 6.19±0.01

Characteristics
- Evolutionary stage: red giant branch
- Spectral type: G8 III/IV
- U−B color index: +0.56
- B−V color index: +0.90

Astrometry
Radial velocity (R_{v})	−28±0.4 km/s
Proper motion (μ)	RA: +50.801 mas/yr Dec.: −5.249 mas/yr
Parallax (π)	7.8706±0.1437 mas
Distance	414 ± 8 ly (127 ± 2 pc)
Absolute magnitude (M_{V})	+0.74

Details
Mass	2.38 M_{☉}
Radius	10.22 R_{☉}
Luminosity	53.7 L_{☉}
Surface gravity (log g)	2.88 cgs
Temperature	5,101±122 K
Metallicity [Fe/H]	−0.11 dex
Rotational velocity (v sin i)	2.4±1.2 km/s
Age	640 Myr

Other designations
- 6 G. Delphini, AG+02°2586, BD+02°4175, GC 28470, HD 194953, HIP 100969, HR 7824, SAO 125843

Database references
SIMBAD	data

HD 194953 (HR 7824) is a solitary star in the equatorial constellation Delphinus. It is faintly visible to the naked eye with an apparent magnitude of 6.19 and is located 414 light years away. However, it is approaching the Solar System with a heliocentric radial velocity of −28 km/s.

HD 194953 has a stellar classification of G8 III/IV — a blended luminosity class of a subgiant and giant. It has 2.38 times the mass of the Sun and an enlarged radius of 10.2 R_{☉} at an age of 640 million years. It radiates at 54 times the luminosity of the Sun from its photosphere at an effective temperature of 5,101 K, giving a yellow hue. HD 194953 is slightly metal deficient with an iron abundance 78% that of the Sun and spins leisurely with a projected rotational velocity of about 2.4 km/s.
