= HD 193556 =

G-type star in the constellation Delphinus

Observation data Epoch J2000.0 Equinox ICRS
- Constellation: Delphinus
- Right ascension: 20^{h} 20^{m} 20.5234^{s}
- Declination: +14° 34′ 09.321″
- Apparent magnitude (V): 6.17±0.01

Characteristics
- Evolutionary stage: red giant branch
- Spectral type: G8 III
- U−B color index: +0.67
- B−V color index: +0.92

Astrometry
Radial velocity (R_{v})	11.7±0.3 km/s
Proper motion (μ)	RA: −3.887 mas/yr Dec.: +5.610 mas/yr
Parallax (π)	6.9878±0.0252 mas
Distance	467 ± 2 ly (143.1 ± 0.5 pc)
Absolute magnitude (M_{V})	+0.04

Details
Mass	2.65 M_{☉}
Radius	11.33 R_{☉}
Luminosity	102 L_{☉}
Surface gravity (log g)	2.76 cgs
Temperature	5,104 K
Metallicity [Fe/H]	+0.03 dex
Rotational velocity (v sin i)	1.5±1.2 km/s
Age	490 Myr

Other designations
- AG+14°2187, BD+14°4263, FK5 3629, GC 28288, HD 193556, HIP 100274, HR 7778, SAO 105988

Database references
SIMBAD	data

HD 193556 (HR 7778) is a solitary star in the equatorial constellation Delphinus. It has an apparent magnitude of 6.17, making it visible to the naked eye under ideal conditions. Parallax measurements place the object at a distance of 467 light years and it is currently receding with a heliocentric radial velocity of 11.7 km/s.

HD 193556 has a stellar classification of G8 III, indicating that it is a red giant. It has 2.65 times the mass of the Sun and is currently 490 million years old, having expanded to 11.33 times the radius of the Sun. It shines with a luminosity of 102 L_{☉} from its enlarged photosphere at an effective temperature of 5,104 K, giving it a yellow glow. HD 193556 has an iron abundance around solar level and spins leisurely with a poorly constrained projected rotational velocity of 1.5 km/s.
