= HD 195479 =

Am star in the constellation Delphinus

- Location of HD 195479 on the map (circled)

Observation data Epoch J2000.0 Equinox J2000.0 (ICRS)
- Constellation: Delphinus
- Right ascension: 20^{h} 30^{m} 58.26388^{s}
- Declination: +20° 36′ 23.0762″
- Apparent magnitude (V): 6.20±0.01

Characteristics
- Evolutionary stage: main sequence
- Spectral type: kA1 hA9 mF2
- U−B color index: +0.13
- B−V color index: +0.12

Astrometry
Radial velocity (R_{v})	−40.1±1.6 km/s
Proper motion (μ)	RA: +95.633 mas/yr Dec.: +58.78 mas/yr
Parallax (π)	11.3074±0.0337 mas
Distance	288.4 ± 0.9 ly (88.4 ± 0.3 pc)
Absolute magnitude (M_{V})	+1.53

Details
Mass	2.05^{+0.38}_{−0.24} M_{☉}
Radius	2.15±0.11 R_{☉}
Luminosity	38.96^{+0.36}_{−0.42} L_{☉}
Surface gravity (log g)	4.08 cgs
Temperature	8,454 K
Metallicity [Fe/H]	−0.11 dex
Rotational velocity (v sin i)	18.0±0.6 km/s
Age	631 Myr

Other designations
- AG+20°2271, BD+20°4602, GC 28540, HD 195479, HIP 101213, HR 7839, SAO 88783, CCDM J20310+2036A, WDS J20310+2036A, TIC 379435621

Database references
SIMBAD	data

HD 195479, also designated as HR 7839, is a solitary star located in the northern constellation Delphinus, the dolphin. It has an apparent magnitude of 6.20, placing it near the limit for naked eye visibility, even under ideal conditions. The object is located relatively close at a distance of 288 light-years based on Gaia DR3 parallax measurements and it is drifting closer with a heliocentric radial velocity of −40.1 km/s. At its current distance, HD 195479's brightness is diminished by an interstellar extinction of 0.27 magnitudes and it has an absolute magnitude of +1.53.

HD 195479 is an Am star with a stellar classification of kA1hA9mF2. The notion indicates that it has the calcium K-lines of an A1 star, the hydrogen lines of an A9 star, and the metallic lines of a F2 star. It has 2.05 times the mass of the Sun and 2.15 times the radius of the Sun. It radiates 38.96 times the luminosity of the Sun from its photosphere at an effective temperature of 8,454 K, giving it white hue when viewed in the night sky. HD 195479 is deficient in iron, having an abundance 77.6% of the Sun's. It is estimated to be 631 million years old and it spins modestly with a projected rotational velocity of 18.0 km/s, common for Am stars.

The star has two optical companions: a 12th magnitude star designated B located 5.7" away along a position angle of 88° and a 13th magnitude star designated C located 55.9" away along a position angle of 206°. They were both observed by American astronomer Sherburne Wesley Burnham during the late 19th century. B and C are both background stars that are far more distant than HD 195479.
