= WISEPC J205628.90+145953.3 =

Star in the constellation Delphinus

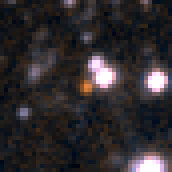
- WISE 2056+1459; Credit: unWISE

Observation data Epoch MJD 55511.01 Equinox J2000
- Constellation: Delphinus
- Right ascension: 20^{h} 56^{m} 28.88^{s}
- Declination: 14° 59′ 53.68″

Characteristics
- Spectral type: Y0
- Apparent magnitude (J (2MASS filter system)): >17.6
- Apparent magnitude (J (MKO filter system)): 19.21 ± 0.07
- Apparent magnitude (H (2MASS filter system)): >17.1
- Apparent magnitude (H (MKO filter system)): 19.56 ± 0.18

Astrometry
Proper motion (μ)	RA: 825.14 ±0.12 mas/yr Dec.: 529.23 ±0.12 mas/yr
Parallax (π)	146.44±0.43 mas
Distance	22.27 ± 0.07 ly (6.83 ± 0.02 pc)

Details
Mass	20 (12–30) M_{Jup}
Radius	0.93 (0.86–1.01) R_{Jup}
Surface gravity (log g)	4.75 (4.5–5.0) cgs
Temperature	464±88 K

Other designations
- WISEPC J205628.90+145953.3; WISEPC J2056+1459; WISE J2056+1459; WISE 2056+1459

Database references
SIMBAD	data

WISE 2056+1459 (full designation WISEPC J205628.90+145953.3) is a brown dwarf of spectral class Y0, located in constellation Delphinus, approximately 23.2 light-years from Earth.

== History of observations ==
WISE 2056+1459 was discovered in 2011 from data, collected by Wide-field Infrared Survey Explorer (WISE) Earth-orbiting satellite—NASA infrared-wavelength 40 cm (16 in) space telescope, which mission lasted from December 2009 to February 2011. WISE 2056+1459 has two discovery papers: Kirkpatrick et al. (2011) and Cushing et al. (2011), however, basically with the same authors and published nearly simultaneously.

- Kirkpatrick et al. presented discovery of 98 new found by WISE brown dwarf systems with components of spectral types M, L, T and Y, among which also was WISE 2056+1459. (Note: These 98 brown dwarf systems are only among first, not all brown dwarf systems, discovered from data, collected by WISE: six discoveries were published earlier (however, also listed in Kirkpatrick et al. (2011)) in Mainzer et al. (2011) and Burgasser et al. (2011), and the other discoveries were published later.)
- Cushing et al. presented discovery of seven brown dwarfs—one of T9.5 type, and six of Y-type—first members of the Y spectral class, ever discovered and spectroscopically confirmed, including "archetypal member" of the Y spectral class WISE 1828+2650, and WISE 2056+1459. These seven objects are also the faintest seven of 98 brown dwarfs, presented in Kirkpatrick et al. (2011).

Currently the most accurate distance estimate of WISE 2056+1459 is a trigonometric parallax, published in 2021 by Kirkpatrick et al.: 140.8±2.0 mas, corresponding to a distance 7.1±0.1 pc, or 23.2±0.3 ly. WISE 2056+1459 has a proper motion of 980.6±1.1 milliarcseconds per year.

== Physical properties ==
The object's temperature estimate is 464±88 K. The object was observed with Gemini GMOS. The researchers used the archived spectrum from Cushing et al. and the new spectrum in this work. The cloudy model included cloud decks of sulfide and chloride condensates. The model did fit the spectra well except for some parts due to the model not including the atmospheric mixing of ammonia (NH_{3}) and lines of methane (CH_{4}) missing in the model. WISE 2056+1459 was also observed with NIRSpec and the Mid-Infrared Instrument. An excellent fit between spectrum and model was produced with a phosphine-free and diabatic model using an effective temperature of 450 Kevlin and a surface gravity of log g = 4.0. These values correspond to a 300 Myr object with a mass of 5 M_{J}. The researchers also found a medium probability (47%) of this object belonging to the Carina-Near group of stars. An analysis of nearby associations and open clusters found a medium probability of 55.7% of the object belonging to the corona of the Hyades star cluster. The mass would remain about the same at 4.9+3.6
−2.5 M_{J}.

== See also ==
Lists:

- List of star systems within 20–25 light years
- List of Y-dwarfs
- List of nearby stellar associations and moving groups

The other six discoveries of brown dwarfs, published in Cushing et al. (2011):

- WISE 0148-7202 (T9.5)
- WISE 0410+1502 (Y0)
- WISE 1405+5534 (Y0 (pec?))
- WISE 1541-2250 (Y0.5)
- WISE 1738+2732 (Y0)
- WISE 1828+2650 (≥Y2)
