= HD 198404 =

Star with an optical companion

Observation data Epoch J2000.0 Equinox J2000.0 (ICRS)
- Constellation: Delphinus
- Right ascension: 20^{h} 49^{m} 59.0925^{s}
- Declination: +05° 32′ 40.508″
- Apparent magnitude (V): 6.19±0.01

Characteristics
- Spectral type: K0
- U−B color index: +0.79
- B−V color index: +0.98

Astrometry
Radial velocity (R_{v})	−21.63±0.31 km/s
Proper motion (μ)	RA: +43.408 mas/yr Dec.: −0.174 mas/yr
Parallax (π)	8.2537±0.1261 mas
Distance	395 ± 6 ly (121 ± 2 pc)
Absolute magnitude (M_{V})	+0.7

Details
Mass	3.12 M_{☉}
Radius	10.54 R_{☉}
Luminosity	56.3 L_{☉}
Surface gravity (log g)	2.8 cgs
Temperature	4,809 K
Metallicity [Fe/H]	+0.17 dex

Other designations
- 21 G. Delphini, AG+05°3046, BD+05°4626, GC 29044, HD 198404, HIP 102833, HR 7975, SAO 126267, WDS J20500+0533A

Database references
SIMBAD	data

HD 198404 (HR 7975) is a star in the equatorial constellation Delphinus. It has an apparent magnitude of 6.19, allowing it to be faintly seen with the naked eye. Parallax measurements place the object at a distance of 395 light years and it is approaching the Solar System with a heliocentric radial velocity of −21.6 km/s.

HD 198404 has a simple stellar classification of K0, indicating that it is a K-type star. Its enlarged diameter of 10.54 R_{☉} and its low surface gravity suggest that it has evolved away from the main sequence to become a giant star. HD 198404 has 3.12 times the mass of the Sun and radiates at 56 times the luminosity of the Sun from its photosphere at an effective temperature of 4,809 K, giving it a yellowish orange hue. The star is metal enriched, having an iron abundance 48% greater than that of the Sun.

HD 198404 has an optical companion located 78.2″ away along a position angle of 127° (as of 2014).
