= HD 196885 Ab =

Extrasolar planet in the constellation Delphinus

Discovery
- Discovered by: Correia et al.
- Discovery site: La Silla Observatory
- Discovery date: October 23, 2007
- Detection method: Radial velocity

Orbital characteristics
- Apastron: 3.36 AU (503 Gm)
- Periastron: 1.24 AU (186 Gm)
- Semi-major axis: 2.30 AU (344 Gm)
- Eccentricity: 0.462
- Orbital period (sidereal): 1349 d 3.693 y
- Average orbital speed: 18.6
- Time of periastron: 2451236
- Argument of periastron: 91.4
- Semi-amplitude: 39.5
- Star: HD 196885 A

HD 196885 Ab (also referred to as HD 196885 b) is a Jovian planet with a minimum mass 2.96 times the mass of Jupiter. This planet was discovered on October 23, 2007. In 2022, the planet's inclination and true mass were measured via astrometry, showing it to be about 3.39 M_{J}.
