= LU Delphini =

Star in the constellation Delphinus

- Location of LU Delphini (circled in red)

Observation data Epoch J2000.0 Equinox ICRS
- Constellation: Delphinus
- Right ascension: 20^{h} 41^{m} 58.16454^{s}
- Declination: +17° 31′ 17.3644″
- Apparent magnitude (V): 6.24±0.01

Characteristics
- Spectral type: G8 III
- U−B color index: +0.57
- B−V color index: +0.94
- Variable type: CST:

Astrometry
Radial velocity (R_{v})	1.6±0.4 km/s
Proper motion (μ)	RA: +15.091 mas/yr Dec.: +43.740 mas/yr
Parallax (π)	7.4534±0.0249 mas
Distance	438 ± 1 ly (134.2 ± 0.4 pc)
Absolute magnitude (M_{V})	+0.39

Details
Mass	1.89 M_{☉}
Radius	13.13±0.27 R_{☉}
Luminosity	83.77^{+0.60}_{−0.63} L_{☉}
Surface gravity (log g)	2.48 cgs
Temperature	4,773^{+4}_{−5} K
Metallicity [Fe/H]	−0.30±0.06 dex
Rotational velocity (v sin i)	<1 km/s
Age	2.95 Gyr

Other designations
- LU Del, AG+17°2244, BD+17°4382, GC 28843, HD 197249, HIP 102158, HR 7923, SAO 106396, TIC 341072887

Database references
SIMBAD	data

LU Delphini is a star located in the equatorial constellation Delphinus, the dolphin. It is also designated as HD 197249 and HR 7923. It has an apparent magnitude of 6.24, placing it near the limit for naked eye visibility. Gaia DR3 parallax measurements imply a distance of 438 light years, and it is currently receding with a heliocentric radial velocity of 1.6 km/s. At its current distance, LU Delphini's brightness is diminished by an interstellar extinction of two-tenths of a magnitude, and it has an absolute visual magnitude of +0.39.

LU Delphini was first observed to be a variable star by Diethard Böhme during the late 1980's. He observed an amplitude of two-tenths of a magnitude over the course of 100 days, and believed it to either be a semiregular variable or a RS Canum Venaticorum variable. However, no variations greater than two-hundredths of a magnitude were detected in Hipparcos data. The object most likely has a constant brightness as opposed to being variable.

The object has a stellar classification of G8 III, indicating that it is an evolved G-type giant star that has ceased hydrogen fusion at its core and left the main sequence. It has 1.89 times the mass of the Sun but at the age of 2.95 billion years, it has expanded to 13.13 times the radius of the Sun. It radiates 83.77 times the luminosity of the Sun from its enlarged photosphere at an effective temperature of 4,773 K, giving it a yellow hue when it is viewed in the night sky. LU Delphini only has half of the Sun's iron abundance, and it spins too slowly for its projected rotational velocity to be measured accurately.
