= 16 Delphini =

Star in the constellation Delphinus

Observation data Epoch J2000 Equinox ICRS
- Constellation: Delphinus
- Right ascension: 20^{h} 55^{m} 38.5698^{s}
- Declination: +12° 34′ 06.877″
- Apparent magnitude (V): 5.54±0.01

Characteristics
- Evolutionary stage: main sequence
- Spectral type: A5 V
- U−B color index: +0.09
- B−V color index: +0.11

Astrometry
| Radial velocity (R_{v}) | 2.0±4.3 km/s |
| Proper motion (μ) | RA: +39.558 mas/yr Dec.: +27.772 mas/yr |
| Parallax (π) | 16.4866±0.06 mas |
| Distance | 197.8 ± 0.7 ly (60.7 ± 0.2 pc) |
| Absolute magnitude (M_{V}) | +1.63 |

Details
| Mass | 2.0±0.1 M_{☉} |
| Radius | 1.9±0.1 R_{☉} |
| Luminosity | 18.7 L_{☉} |
| Surface gravity (log g) | 4.10±0.14 cgs |
| Temperature | 9,093±309 K |
| Metallicity [Fe/H] | −0.01 dex |
| Rotational velocity (v sin i) | 159 km/s |
| Age | 400^{+150}_{−215} Myr |

Other designations
- 16 Del, AG+12°2414, BD+12°4501, GC 29202, HD 199254, HIP 103298, HR 8012, SAO 106666, WDS J20556+1234A

Database references
| SIMBAD | data |

16 Delphini is a star in the northern constellation of Delphinus. It has an apparent magnitude of 5.54, making it faintly visible to the naked eye. The star is relatively close at a distance of 198 light years but is receding with a poorly constrained radial velocity of 2 km/s.

16 Delphini is a chemically peculiar A-type main-sequence star with a stellar classification of A5 V. It has twice the Sun's mass, 1.9 times its radius, and shines at 18.7 L_{☉}. This yields an effective temperature of 9,039 K, giving it a white glow. 16 Del is 400 million years old – 56.5% through its main sequence lifetime – and spins rapidly with a projected rotational velocity of 159 km/s.

16 Del has a companion that was first discovered by John Herschel and was even noted to be a spectroscopic binary. It is now considered to be a single star.
