= 13 Delphini =

Double star in the constellation Delphinus

Observation data Epoch J2000.0 Equinox ICRS
- Constellation: Delphinus
- A
- Right ascension: 20^{h} 47^{m} 48.3330^{s}
- Declination: +06° 00′ 29.551″
- Apparent magnitude (V): 5.66
- B
- Right ascension: 20^{h} 47^{m} 48.3012^{s}
- Declination: +06° 00′ 28.127″
- Apparent magnitude (V): 8.51

Characteristics

A
- Evolutionary stage: main sequence
- Spectral type: A0 V
- U−B color index: −0.09
- B−V color index: −0.01

Astrometry
Radial velocity (R_{v})	−7±4.3 km/s
Absolute magnitude (M_{V})	−0.01

A
Proper motion (μ)	RA: +8.255 mas/yr Dec.: −13.162 mas/yr
Parallax (π)	6.9265±0.0489 mas
Distance	471 ± 3 ly (144 ± 1 pc)

B
Proper motion (μ)	RA: +5.663 mas/yr Dec.: −12.280 mas/yr
Parallax (π)	6.6697±0.0989 mas
Distance	489 ± 7 ly (150 ± 2 pc)

Details

A
Mass	2.51^{+0.31}_{−0.36} M_{☉}
Radius	3.7±0.4 R_{☉}
Luminosity	119^{+20}_{−17} L_{☉}
Surface gravity (log g)	3.69^{+0.61}_{−0.69} cgs
Temperature	9,840^{+91}_{−90} K
Metallicity [Fe/H]	0.00 dex
Rotational velocity (v sin i)	170 km/s
Age	307 Myr

B
Mass	1.5 M_{☉}
Surface gravity (log g)	3.90 cgs
Temperature	6,449 K
Metallicity [Fe/H]	−0.14 dex

Other designations
- 13 Del, 18 G. Delphini, AG+05°3035, BD+05°4613, GC 28986, HD 198069, HIP 102633, HR 7953, SAO 126222, WDS J20478+0600A

Database references
SIMBAD	data

13 Delphini is a binary star in the northern constellation of Delphinus, with a combined apparent magnitude of 5.64. The system is located at a distance of 471 light years but is approaching the Solar System with a heliocentric radial velocity of about −7 km/s.

13 Delphini A has an apparent magnitude of 5.66, while its companion has an apparent magnitude of 8.51. As of 2016, the pair have a separation of 1.5″ located at a position angle of 200°.

13 Delphini has a blended stellar classification of A0 V, indicating that it is an ordinary A-type main-sequence star. However, when the components are analysed individually, the primary star is given a class of B9V. It has 2.51 times the mass of the Sun and has an effective temperature of 9,840 K. However, the star is large for its class, having a radius almost 4 times that of the Sun and a luminosity 119 times greater. This is due to 13 Delphini having completed 86.1% of its main sequence lifetime and has led one source to classify it as a subgiant instead. It spins rapidly with a projected rotational velocity of 170 km/s and has an age of 307 million years.

This star has been designated Lambda Delphini by Johann Elert Bode, but the designation is generally unused now.
