= 15 Delphini =

Star in the constellation of Delphinus

Observation data Epoch J2000 Equinox ICRS
- Constellation: Delphinus
- Right ascension: 20^{h} 49^{m} 37.7673^{s}
- Declination: +12° 32′ 42.459″
- Apparent magnitude (V): 5.99±0.01

Characteristics
- Evolutionary stage: main sequence
- Spectral type: F5 V
- U−B color index: −0.06
- B−V color index: +0.42

Astrometry
Radial velocity (R_{v})	4.1±0.4 km/s
Proper motion (μ)	RA: +52.776 mas/yr Dec.: +97.020 mas/yr
Parallax (π)	33.0028±0.0322 mas
Distance	98.83 ± 0.10 ly (30.30 ± 0.03 pc)
Absolute magnitude (M_{V})	+3.58

Details
Mass	1.28 M_{☉}
Radius	1.40 R_{☉}
Luminosity	2.98 L_{☉}
Surface gravity (log g)	4.25 cgs
Temperature	6,624±50 K
Metallicity [Fe/H]	−0.13±0.03 dex
Rotational velocity (v sin i)	5.6±0.3 km/s
Age	1.21±0.63 Gyr

Other designations
- 15 Del, AG+12°2395, BD+12°4472, GC 29037, HD 198390, HIP 102805, HR 7973, SAO 106536, WDS J20496+1233A

Database references
SIMBAD	data

15 Delphini (15 Del) is a star in the northern constellation of Delphinus. It has an apparent magnitude of 5.99, allowing it to be faintly seen with the naked eye. The star is relatively close at a distance of 99 light years but is receding with a heliocentric radial velocity of 4.1 km/s.

15 Del has a stellar classification of F5 V, indicating that it is an ordinary F-type main-sequence star. It has 128% the mass of the Sun and a radius of 1.4 R_{☉}. It radiates at 3 times the luminosity of the Sun from its photosphere at an effective temperature of 6,624 K, giving a yellow-white hue. 15 Del has an iron abundance 74% that of the Sun and at an age of 1.21 billion years — spins leisurely with a projected rotational velocity of 5.6 km/s.

15 Delphini has 3 companions listed below. Components B and D have different proper motions compared to the host. However, C appears to have a common proper motion, suggesting physical relation, but its parallax indicates a further distance compared to 15 Delphini.

15 Delphini's companions
Companion	m_{v}	PA (°)	Year	Sep. (″)
B	14.10	19	2013	52.1
C	11.07	86	2020	105.5
D	11.89	276	2020	189.6
