= HD 195019 b =

Extrasolar planet in the constellation Delphinus

Discovery
- Discovered by: Fischer et al.
- Discovery site: Lick Observatory
- Discovery date: 1998
- Detection method: Radial Velocity

Orbital characteristics
- Apastron: 0.1407 AU (21,050,000 km)
- Periastron: 0.1369 AU (20,480,000 km)
- Semi-major axis: 0.1388 ± 0.008 AU (20,760,000 ± 1,200,000 km)
- Eccentricity: 0.014 ± 0.0044
- Orbital period (sidereal): 18.20163 ± 0.0004 d 0.4983248 y
- Average orbital speed: 83.24
- Time of periastron: 2,411,015 ± 1.2
- Argument of periastron: 322 ± 20
- Semi-amplitude: 272.3 ±1.4
- Star: HD 195019

HD 195019 b is an exoplanet orbiting around HD 195019 in the binary star system. It has a minimum mass of 3.7 M_{J}. It orbits very close to the star. Like many planets at close distance, its orbit is circular, even more circular or less eccentric than Earth. It takes 437 hours to orbit with velocity of 83.24 kilometers per second.

== See also ==
- List of exoplanets discovered before 2000
