= HD 196775 =

Star in the constellation Delphinus

Observation data Epoch J2000.0 Equinox ICRS
- Constellation: Delphinus
- Right ascension: 20^{h} 39^{m} 04.9681^{s}
- Declination: +15° 50′ 17.511″
- Apparent magnitude (V): 5.98

Characteristics
- Evolutionary stage: main sequence
- Spectral type: B3 V
- U−B color index: −0.71
- B−V color index: −0.16

Astrometry
Radial velocity (R_{v})	−4.6±1 km/s
Proper motion (μ)	RA: −0.868 mas/yr Dec.: −15.290 mas/yr
Parallax (π)	3.1211±0.0617 mas
Distance	1,050 ± 20 ly (320 ± 6 pc)
Absolute magnitude (M_{V})	−2.05

Details
Mass	7±0.4 M_{☉}
Radius	4.13±0.14 R_{☉}
Luminosity	1,507 L_{☉}
Surface gravity (log g)	3.97 cgs
Temperature	18,100 K
Rotational velocity (v sin i)	145±6 km/s
Age	36.1±9.5 Myr

Other designations
- AG+15°2265, BD+15°4220, GC 28785, HD 196775, HIP 101909, HR 7899, SAO 106347, WDS J20391+1550A

Database references
SIMBAD	data

HD 196775 (HR 7899) is a solitary star in the equatorial constellation Delphinus. It has an apparent magnitude of 5.98, allowing it to be faintly seen with the naked eye. The object is relatively far at a distance of 1,050 light years but is approaching the Solar System with a heliocentric radial velocity of −4.6 km/s. HD 196775 has a high peculiar velocity of 21.8+1.9
−4.1 km/s compared to neighboring stars, indicating that it may be a runaway star.

HD 196775 has a general stellar classification of B3 V, indicating that it is an ordinary B-type main-sequence star. However, once source gives it a class of B4 Vn, making it slightly cooler and having broad absorption lines due to rapid rotation. It has an angular diameter of 0.12 mas, yielding a radius 4.13 times that of the Sun. At present it has 7 times the mass of the Sun and shines at 1507 L_{☉} from its photosphere at an effective temperature of 18,100 K, giving it a whitish blue hue. HD 196775 is 36 million years old and is spinning rapidly with a projected rotational velocity of 145 km/s.

HD 196775 has four faint optical companions whose parameters are listed below.

HD 196775's Companions
Companion	m_{v}	PA (°)	Year	Sep. (″)
B	12.40	154	2006	5.2
C	11.31	122	2012	39.9
D	14.40	146	2012	28.8
E	14.40	33	2012	23.3
