= 10 Delphini =

K-type star in the constellation Delphinus

Observation data Epoch J2000.0 Equinox J2000.0 (ICRS)
- Constellation: Delphinus
- Right ascension: 20^{h} 41^{m} 16.2079^{s}
- Declination: +14° 34′ 58.361″
- Apparent magnitude (V): 6.00±0.01

Characteristics
- Evolutionary stage: red giant branch
- Spectral type: K4 III
- U−B color index: +1.44
- B−V color index: +1.24

Astrometry
Radial velocity (R_{v})	−32±2 km/s
Proper motion (μ)	RA: −9.462 mas/yr Dec.: −0.344 mas/yr
Parallax (π)	6.6178±0.0397 mas
Distance	493 ± 3 ly (151.1 ± 0.9 pc)
Absolute magnitude (M_{V})	+0.06

Details
Mass	2.42±0.71 M_{☉}
Radius	18.47^{+1.02}_{−1.03} R_{☉}
Luminosity	125±2 L_{☉}
Surface gravity (log g)	2.27 cgs
Temperature	4,378 K
Metallicity [Fe/H]	0.00 dex
Age	794±33 Myr

Other designations
- 10 Del, AG+14°2269, BD+14°4393, GC 28826, HD 197121, HIP 102080, HR 7918, SAO 106384

Database references
SIMBAD	data

10 Delphini (10 Del) is a solitary star in the equatorial constellation Delphinus. It has an apparent magnitude of 6.00, allowing it to be faintly seen with the naked eye. Parallax measurements put the object at a distance of 493 light years but is drifting closer with a heliocentric radial velocity of −32 km/s.

10 Delphini has a stellar classification of K4 III or K2 III, both indicating that it is a red giant. However, there is some uncertainty behind the first classification. It has twice the mass of the Sun but at an age of 794 million years — expanded to 18 times the radius of the Sun. It shines at 125 L_{☉} from its enlarged photosphere at an effective temperature of 4,378 K, giving it an orange glow. 10 Del has a solar metallicity.

10 Del has been suspected to be a variable star, although it hasn't been catalogued as such in the GCVS.
