= 17 Delphini =

Suspected variable star in Delphinus

Observation data Epoch J2000 Equinox ICRS
- Constellation: Delphinus
- Right ascension: 20^{h} 55^{m} 36.689^{s}
- Declination: +13° 43′ 17.53″
- Apparent magnitude (V): 5.18 (5.16-5.27)

Characteristics
- Evolutionary stage: red giant branch
- Spectral type: K0 III
- U−B color index: +0.95
- B−V color index: +1.13
- Variable type: suspected

Astrometry
Radial velocity (R_{v})	−10.2±0.9 km/s
Proper motion (μ)	RA: +16.457 mas/yr Dec.: −11.468 mas/yr
Parallax (π)	6.3132±0.0699 mas
Distance	517 ± 6 ly (158 ± 2 pc)
Absolute magnitude (M_{V})	−0.64

Details
Mass	2.33 M_{☉}
Radius	23.36 R_{☉}
Luminosity	219 L_{☉}
Surface gravity (log g)	2.07 cgs
Temperature	4,616 K
Metallicity [Fe/H]	−0.19 dex
Rotational velocity (v sin i)	3±1 km/s
Age	832 Myr

Other designations
- 17 Del, AG+13°2209, BD+13°4572, FK5 3669, GC 29201, HD 199253, HIP 103294, HR 8011, SAO 106665

Database references
SIMBAD	data

17 Delphini is a solitary star in the northern constellation of Delphinus. It has an absolute magnitude of −0.64 and apparent magnitude of 5.18, allowing it to be faintly seen with the naked eye. Located 517 light years away, it is approaching the Solar System with a heliocentric radial velocity of −10.2 km/s.

17 Delphini is an orange giant that is most likely on the horizontal branch (84% probability). At present it has 2.33 times the mass of the Sun, but at an age of 832 million years — has expanded to 23.36 times the radius of the Sun. It shines at 219 solar luminosities from its enlarged photosphere at an effective temperature of 4,616 K, giving it an orange glow. 17 Del has an iron abundance 64% that of the Sun and spins modestly with a projected rotational velocity of 3 km/s.

17 Del is suspected to be a variable star of unknown type ranging from 5.16 to 5.27.
