= Kappa Delphini =

Astrometric binary star system in the constellation Delphinus

- Location of κ Delphini (circled)

Observation data Epoch J2000 Equinox ICRS
- Constellation: Delphinus
- Right ascension: 20^{h} 39^{m} 07.78430^{s}
- Declination: +10° 05′ 10.3383″
- Apparent magnitude (V): 5.07

Characteristics
- Spectral type: G1IV + ? + K2IV
- U−B color index: 0.235
- B−V color index: 0.702±0.013
- Variable type: Constant

Astrometry
| Radial velocity (R_{v}) | −53.51 km/s |
| Proper motion (μ) | RA: 317.681 mas/yr Dec.: 32.566 mas/yr |
| Parallax (π) | 33.3213±0.0782 mas |
| Distance | 97.9 ± 0.2 ly (30.01 ± 0.07 pc) |
| Absolute magnitude (M_{V}) | 2.7 |

Orbit
| Period (P) | 45±5 yr |
| Semi-major axis (a) | 0.520±0.030″ |
| Eccentricity (e) | 0.8±0.4 |
| Inclination (i) | 107±18° |
| Longitude of the node (Ω) | 326±17° |
| Periastron epoch (T) | B 1971.2±1.8 |
| Argument of periastron (ω) (secondary) | 8±34° |

Details

κ Del Aa
| Mass | 1.43 M_{☉} |
| Luminosity | 8.3 L_{☉} |
| Surface gravity (log g) | 3.69 cgs |
| Temperature | 5,643 K |
| Metallicity [Fe/H] | +0.01 dex |
| Rotational velocity (v sin i) | 1.77 km/s |
| Age | 3.1 Gyr |

κ Del Ab
| Mass | 0.4±0.2 M_{☉} |

Other designations
- κ Del, 7 Delphini, BD+09°4600, FK5 772, GC 28756, HD 196755, HIP 101916, HR 7896, SAO 126059, CCDM J20392+1005A, WDS J20391+1005A

Database references
| SIMBAD | data |

Kappa Delphini is a binary star system in the constellation Delphinus. Its name is a Bayer designation that is Latinized from κ Delphini and abbreviated as kappa Del or κ Del. This system is faintly visible to the naked eye as a point of light with an apparent magnitude of 5.07. It is located about 97.9 light-years (30.0 pc) away, based on its parallax.

Kappa Delphini is an astrometric binary. The primary star is an early G-type subgiant star. It has a mass 1.61 times that of the Sun, and is 6.8 times more luminous. The companion star regularly perturbs the G-type primary star primary, causing it to wobble around the barycenter. From this, an orbital period of 45 years has been calculated. The secondary star is a low-mass star, at only 0.4 M_{☉}.

A third star is 12th magnitude ADS 14101 B at an angular separation of 10″ as of 2001, but it is a background object. HD 196794 is an 8th magnitude K2 subgiant, 214″ away in the sky, being at the same distance as κ Delphini and sharing a common proper motion.
