= Eta Delphini =

Star in the constellation Delphinus

- Location of η Delphini (circled)

Observation data Epoch J2000.0 Equinox J2000.0 (ICRS)
- Constellation: Delphinus
- Right ascension: 20^{h} 33^{m} 57.042^{s}
- Declination: +13° 01′ 37.934″
- Apparent magnitude (V): 5.38

Characteristics
- Evolutionary stage: main sequence
- Spectral type: A3 IVs
- U−B color index: +0.05
- B−V color index: +0.08
- Variable type: Constant

Astrometry
Radial velocity (R_{v})	−25.00±4.2 km/s
Proper motion (μ)	RA: +69.654 mas/yr Dec.: +39.707 mas/yr
Parallax (π)	18.1436±0.4530 mas
Distance	180 ± 4 ly (55 ± 1 pc)
Absolute magnitude (M_{V})	+1.11

Details
Mass	2.12 M_{☉}
Radius	1.43 R_{☉}
Luminosity	11.5 L_{☉}
Surface gravity (log g)	4.38 cgs
Temperature	9,355±318 K
Metallicity [Fe/H]	+0.56 dex
Rotational velocity (v sin i)	65 km/s
Age	309 Myr

Other designations
- η Del, 3 Del, BD+12°4378, GC 28617, HD 195943, HIP 101483, HR 7858, SAO 106248

Database references
SIMBAD	data

Eta Delphini is a candidate astrometric binary star system in the northern constellation of Delphinus. Its name is a Bayer designation that is Latinized from η Delphini and abbreviated η Del or η Del. This system has a combined apparent visual magnitude of about 5.4, meaning that it is faintly visible to the naked eye as a point of light. Based upon a parallax measurement of 18.14 mas, this star is around 180 light-years (55 pc) distance from the Sun. It is drifting closer with a radial velocity of −25 km/s.

The stellar classification of the visible component is A3 IVs, which matches an A-type subgiant star with narrow absorption lines. It is a suspected chemically peculiar star that is about 64.3%±9.2% of the way through its main sequence lifetime. It has more than double the mass and radius of the Sun, and is radiating 11.5 times the Sun's luminosity from its photosphere at an effective temperature of around 9,355 K.
