= HD 190228 =

Star located in the constellation Vulpecula

Observation data Epoch J2000.0 Equinox ICRS
- Constellation: Vulpecula
- Right ascension: 20^{h} 03^{m} 00.77266^{s}
- Declination: +28° 18′ 24.6871″
- Apparent magnitude (V): 7.30

Characteristics
- Evolutionary stage: subgiant
- Spectral type: G5 IV
- B−V color index: 0.793±0.006

Astrometry
Radial velocity (R_{v})	−50.110±0.0032 km/s
Proper motion (μ)	RA: 104.273 mas/yr Dec.: −69.961 mas/yr
Parallax (π)	15.8973±0.0159 mas
Distance	205.2 ± 0.2 ly (62.90 ± 0.06 pc)
Absolute magnitude (M_{V})	3.36

Details
Mass	1.18±0.05 M_{☉}
Radius	2.38±0.13 R_{☉}
Luminosity	4.57+1.39 −0.77 L_{☉}
Surface gravity (log g)	3.92±0.02 cgs
Temperature	5,311±13 K
Metallicity [Fe/H]	–0.24±0.06 dex
Rotational velocity (v sin i)	1.43±0.51 km/s
Age	5.07±0.78 Gyr

Other designations
- BD+27° 3593, HD 190228, HIP 98714, SAO 88118, PPM 110298, GCRV 70273

Database references
SIMBAD	data
ARICNS	data

HD 190228 is a star with an orbiting substellar companion in the northern constellation of Vulpecula. Its apparent magnitude is 7.30 – too faint to be seen with the naked eye – and the absolute magnitude is 3.34. Based on parallax measurements, it is located at a distance of 205 light-years (63 parsecs) from the Sun. The system is drifting closer with a radial velocity of −50 km/s.

The spectrum of HD 190228 presents as a subgiant star with a stellar classification of G5 IV, indicating it has exhausted the supply of hydrogen at its core and is evolving off the main sequence. The star is older than the Sun with an age over 5 billion years with a projected rotational velocity of 1.4 km/s. A metal-poor star, it has 18% more mass than the Sun and has grown to 2.4 times the Sun's girth. The star is radiating roughly 4.6 times the luminosity of the Sun from its photosphere at an effective temperature of 5,311 K.

== Planetary system ==
In 2000, it was announced that a giant exoplanet was orbiting the star with a minimum mass of 5 Jupiter masses, designated HD 190228 b. The planetary nature of the object was questioned because of the low metal content of the star: giant planets are more likely to be found around high-metallicity stars, so it was argued that the object was more likely to be a brown dwarf. A 2011 study using astrometric measurements from Hipparcos found that, with 95% confidence, HD 190228 b is in fact a brown dwarf of 49.4±14.8 Jupiter masses in a nearly face-on orbit.

However, later studies in 2022 and 2023 using both Hipparcos and Gaia astrometry found much lower true masses, close to the minimum mass. While the former study notes that their inclination measurement is poorly constrained, and that further study should better constrain the mass, the latter says that the low-mass solution is preferred given the relatively large uncertainty in the Hipparcos data. Thus, as of 2023 it seems likely that HD 190228 b is an exoplanet. It takes 3.1 years to orbit the star, and its orbit is elliptical with an eccentricity of 0.55.

The HD 190228 planetary system
Companion (in order from star)	Mass	Semimajor axis (AU)	Orbital period (years)	Eccentricity	Inclination (°)	Radius
b	6.1+1.2 −1.0 M_{J}	2.293±0.031	3.1391+0.0053 −0.005	0.547+0.01 −0.011	48+16 −10 or 132+10 −16	—
