= Theta Delphini =

Star in the constellation of Delphinus

- Location of θ Delphini (circled)

Observation data Epoch J2000 Equinox ICRS
- Constellation: Delphinus
- Right ascension: 20^{h} 38^{m} 43.987^{s}
- Declination: +13° 18′ 54.455″
- Apparent magnitude (V): 5.69

Characteristics
- Spectral type: K3Ib
- U−B color index: +1.71
- B−V color index: 1.509±0.047

Astrometry
Radial velocity (R_{v})	−15.09±0.13 km/s
Proper motion (μ)	RA: 2.985 mas/yr Dec.: 0.088 mas/yr
Parallax (π)	1.6865±0.045 mas
Distance	1,930 ± 50 ly (590 ± 20 pc)

Details
Mass	5.69 M_{☉}
Radius	125 R_{☉} 88±25 R_{☉}
Luminosity	2,333+1,103 −748 L_{☉}
Surface gravity (log g)	1.3 cgs
Temperature	3,986±170 K
Metallicity [Fe/H]	+0.22 dex
Rotational velocity (v sin i)	3.0 km/s

Other designations
- θ Del, 8 Del, BD+12°4411, GC 28743, HD 196725, HIP 101882, HR 7892, SAO 106342, PPM 138761

Database references
SIMBAD	data

Theta Delphini is a single star in the northern constellation of Delphinus. Its name is a Bayer designation that is Latinized from θ Delphini and abbreviated Theta Del or θ Del. This star has an apparent visual magnitude of about 5.7, meaning that it is just barely visible to the naked eye under excellent viewing conditions. The distance to this star is approximately 2,050 light years from the Sun based on parallax. It is drifting closer with a radial velocity of −15 km/s.

The stellar classification of Theta Delphini is K3Ib, which means it is a K-type supergiant. These types of stars form when relatively massive (10 to 30 M_{☉}) stars like B-type main sequence stars run out of hydrogen to fuse and start cooling down. It has been described as a super-metal-rich star because of its high metallicity.
