= Iota Delphini =

A-type giant star in the constellation Delphinus

- Location of Iota Delphini (circled)

Observation data Epoch J2000 Equinox ICRS
- Constellation: Delphinus
- Right ascension: 20^{h} 37^{m} 49.1198^{s}
- Declination: +11° 22′ 39.631″
- Apparent magnitude (V): 5.42±0.01

Characteristics
- Evolutionary stage: main sequence
- Spectral type: A1 IV
- U−B color index: +0.03
- B−V color index: +0.03

Astrometry
Radial velocity (R_{v})	−3.9±0.9 km/s
Proper motion (μ)	RA: +38.867 mas/yr Dec.: −8.609 mas/yr
Parallax (π)	16.6478±0.0728 mas
Distance	195.9 ± 0.9 ly (60.1 ± 0.3 pc)
Absolute magnitude (M_{V})	1.62

Orbit
Period (P)	11.039 days
Eccentricity (e)	0.23
Periastron epoch (T)	2422139.862
Argument of periastron (ω) (secondary)	61.8°
Semi-amplitude (K_{1}) (primary)	26.0 km/s

Details
Mass	2.47 M_{☉}
Radius	1.9 R_{☉}
Luminosity	23 L_{☉}
Surface gravity (log g)	4.29 cgs
Temperature	9,130 K
Metallicity [Fe/H]	−0.25 dex
Rotational velocity (v sin i)	28 km/s
Age	225 Myr

Other designations
- ι Del, 5 Delphini, BD+10°4339, GC 28711, HD 196544, HIP 101800, HR 7883, SAO 106322

Database references
SIMBAD	data

Iota Delphini is a star in the constellation Delphinus. Its name is a Bayer designation that is Latinized from ι Delphini and abbreviated Iota Del or ι Del. The star has an apparent visual magnitude of about 5.4, meaning that it is just barely visible to the naked eye. Based upon parallax measurements made by the Gaia spacecraft, this star is located at a distance of 196 light years.

Iota Delphini's spectral type is A1IV, meaning it is presenting as an A-type subgiant. Observations of the star's spectrum reveal a periodic Doppler shift. This means that Iota Delphini is a spectroscopic binary with a period of 11 days and an eccentricity of 0.23. However, almost no information is known about the companion star.

Iota Delphini appears to be an Am star, also known as a metallic-line star. These types of stars have spectra indicating anomalous abundances of certain metals. Observations of Iota Delphini's spectrum have shown lower amounts of calcium and higher amounts of iron than usual.
