= List of brown dwarfs =

This is a list of notable brown dwarfs. These are objects that have masses between heavy gas giants and low-mass stars. The first isolated brown dwarf discovered was Teide 1 in 1995. The first brown dwarf discovered orbiting a star was Gliese 229 B, also discovered in 1995. The first brown dwarf found to have a planet was 2M1207, discovered in 2004. As of 2015, more than 2,800 brown dwarfs have been identified. An isolated object with less than about 13 Jupiter masses is technically a sub-brown dwarf or rogue planet.

Because the mass of a brown dwarf is between that of a planet and that of a star, they have also been called planetars or hyperjovians. Various catalog designations have been used to name brown dwarfs. Brown dwarfs with names ending in a letter such as B, C, or D are in orbit around a primary star; those with names ending in a lower-case letter such as b, c, or d, may be exoplanets (see Exoplanet naming convention).

Some exoplanets, especially those detected by radial velocity, can turn out to be brown dwarfs if their mass is higher than originally thought: most have only known minimum masses because the inclination of their orbit is not known. Examples include HD 114762 b (>11.68 M_{J}), Pi Mensae b (>10.312 M_{J}), and NGC 2423-3 b (>10.6 M_{J}).

A complete list of more than 3,000 ultracool dwarfs, which includes brown dwarfs and low-mass stars, is being maintained by astronomers. It is called the UltracoolSheet. The same team also produced a list of 1,000 ultracool dwarfs with their mass being determined.

== Confirmed brown dwarfs orbiting primary stars ==
Sorted by increasing right ascension of the parent star. Brown dwarfs within a system sorted by increasing orbital period.

Some brown dwarfs listed could still be massive planets.

Star	Constellation	Right ascension	Declination	App. mag.	Distance (ly)	Spectral type	Brown dwarf	Mass (M_{J})	Radius (R_{J})	Orbital period (d)	Semimajor axis (AU)	Ecc.	Discovery year
54 Piscium	Pisces	00^{h} 39^{m} 22^{s}	+21° 15′ 02″	5.88	36.1	K0V+T7.5	B	45.96 ±4.05	0.85		476		2006
81 Cancri	Cancer	09^{h} 12^{m} 14.69^{s}	14° 59 ′ 39.6″	6.77	66	G9V+L8	CD				880		2001
HD 63754	Puppis	07^{h} 49^{m} 45^{s}	20° 12′ 27″	6.55	163.6	G0V + L/T	b	81.9	0.86	26,791	16.9	0.26	2024
CT Chamaeleontis	Chamaeleon	11^{h} 04^{m} 09^{s}	–76° 27′ 19″	12.36	538	K7+M8	b	17	2.2		440		2008
HD 984	Cetus	00^{h} 14^{m} 10.25^{s}	−07° 11′ 56.82″	7.32	149.1	F7V	B	61	1.576	51,100	28	0.76	2015
Eta Coronae Borealis	Corona Borealis	15^{h} 23^{m} 22.6^{s}	30° 14′ 56″	5.02	58.3	G2+G2+L8	C	44.00 ±6.46	0.95		3,600		2010
G 196-3	Ursa Major	10^{h} 04^{m} 22^{s}	+50° 23′ 23″	11.77	50.2	M2.5+L3β	b	31.66 ±7.19	1.18		300		1998
Gliese 570	Libra	14^{h} 57^{m} 28^{s}	−21° 24′ 56″	5.64	19.0	K4V+ M1V+M3V	D	32.54 ±6.01	0.93		1,500		2000
GU Piscium	Pisces	01^{h} 12^{m} 35.04^{s}	+17° 03′ 55.7″	13.1	155.3	M3V+T3.5	b	11			2,000		2006
HD 89744	Ursa Major	10^{h} 22^{m} 10.56^{s}	+41° 13′ 46.31″	5.74	126.2	F7IV	B						2000
HD 100546	Musca	11^{h} 33^{m} 25^{s}	–70° 11′ 41″	6.70	337.25	B9Vne	b	20			6.5?		2005
HN Pegasi	Pegasus	21^{h} 44^{m} 28.46^{s}	+14° 46′ 7.8″		58.3	G0V+T2.5	B	17.06 ±6.9	1.14		795		2006
UScoCTIO 108	Scorpius	16^{h} 05^{m} 54^{s}	–18° 18′ 43″		473	M7	b	14			670		2007
HD 41004 B	Pictor	05^{h} 59^{m} 50^{s}	–48° 14′ 23″	12.33	139	K1IV+M2	b	18.4		1.3283	0.0177	0.081	2004
CoRoT-15	Monoceros	06^{h} 28^{m} 27.81^{s}	+6° 11′ 10.5″	22		F7V	b	63.4	1.12	3.06036	0.045	0	2010
Xi Ursae Majoris B	Ursa Major	11^{h} 18^{m} 12^{s}	+31° 32′ 15″	4.73	25.11	F8.5V	b	37		3.98	0.06	0	1931
Upsilon Andromedae	Andromeda	01^{h} 36^{m} 48^{s}	+41° 24′ 20″	4.63	43.9	F8V	Samh	13.98		237.7	0.822	0.224	1999
Gliese 758	Lyra	19^{h} 23^{m} 34^{s}	+33° 13′ 19″	6.36	51.9	G8V+T9	B	23		96	21		2009
Tau Geminorum	Gemini	07^{h} 11^{m} 08^{s}	+30° 14′ 43″	4.40	302	K2III	b	18.1		305			2004
HAT-P-13	Ursa Major	08^{h} 39^{m} 32^{s}	+47° 21′ 07″	10.62	698	G4	c	15.2		428.5	1.186	0.691	2009
HD 16760	Perseus	02^{h} 42^{m} 21^{s}	+38° 37′ 07″	8.74	163	G5V	b	14.3		465.1	1.13	0.067	2009
HD 13189	Triangulum	02^{h} 09^{m} 40^{s}	+32° 18′ 59″	7.57	603.4	K2II	b	14		471.6	1.85	0.28	2005
HD 8673	Andromeda	01^{h} 26^{m} 09^{s}	+34° 34′ 47″	6.31	124.75	F7V	b	14		639	1.58		2005
Gliese 569	Boötes	14^{h} 54^{m} 29^{s}	+16° 06′ 04″	10.2	31.5	M3V+M8.5	Ba + Bb	116		870	0.87	0.317	1988
HD 29587	Perseus	04^{h} 41^{m} 34^{s}	+42° 07′ 25″	7.29	146.77	G2V	b	40		1,471.7	2.5	0.37	1996
ChaHα8	Chamaeleon	11^{h} 07^{m} 48^{s}	−77° 40′ 08″	20.1	522	M6.5	b	18		1,590.9	1	0.49	2007
CoRoT-20	Monoceros	06^{h} 30^{m} 55.3^{s}	+0° 13′ 37″	14.66	4000	G2V	c	17		1,675	2.9	0.6	2010
HD 168443	Serpens	18^{h} 20^{m} 04^{s}	–09° 35′ 34″	6.92	123.5	G5	c	34		1,739.5	2.87	0.228	2001
HD 38529 A	Orion	05^{h} 46^{m} 34^{s}	+01° 10′ 05″	5.94	138	G4IV	c	37		2,174.3	3.68	0.36	2002
Epsilon Indi	Indus	22^{h} 03^{m} 22^{s}	–56° 47′ 09″	4.69	11.8	K5V+T1V+T6V	Bb	28		5,478.75	2.65		2003
HW Virginis	Virgo	12^{h} 44^{m} 20^{s}	−08° 40′ 17″	10.9	590	sdB+M	b	19.23		5,786	5.30	0.46	2008
DT Virginis	Virgo	13^{h} 0^{m} 41.74^{s}	12° 21 ′ 14.7″	9.72	37.55	M0V+T8.5p	c	10.29 ±2.46	1.15	33,081	1100		2010
HD 4113	Sculptor	00^{h} 43^{m} 12.60^{s}	−37° 58′ 57.48″	7.88	136	G5V+T9	C	60		73,000	20		2006
Gliese 229	Lepus	06^{h} 10^{m} 35^{s}	–21° 51′ 42″	8.14	19	M1V+T6.5	B	40		73,050	40		1995
TYC 9486-927-1	Octans	21^{h} 26^{m} 50.4^{s}	－81° 40′ 29.3″	11.82	111	M1V+L3γ	2MASS J2126-8140	13.3 ± 1.7		328,725,000	6,900		2009
Epsilon Indi	Indus	22^{h} 03^{m} 22^{s}	–56° 47′ 09″	4.69	11.8	K5V+T1V+T6V	Ba	47		1,532,899.8			2003
HD 131664	Apus	15^{h} 00^{m} 06^{s}	−73° 32′ 07″	8.13	180.8	G3V	b	18.15		1,951	3.17	0.638	2008
HD 136118	Serpens	15^{h} 18^{m} 55^{s}	−01° 35′ 32″	6.94	171	F9V	b	42		1,209	1.45	0.352	2002
HD 140913	Corona Borealis	15^{h} 45^{m} 07^{s}	+28° 28′ 12″	8.07	156.42	G0V	b	46		147.94	0.54	0.61	1996
GQ Lupi	Lupus	15^{h} 49^{m} 12^{s}	–35° 39′ 03″	11.4	400	K7eV+M9e	b	30.1+1.1 −1.2	3.7±0.7		103		2005
HD 162020	Scorpius	17^{h} 50^{m} 38^{s}	–40° 19′ 06″	9.18	101.95	K2V	b	15.0		8.428198	0.0751	0.277	2000
Nu Ophiuchi	Ophiuchus	17^{h} 59^{m} 01^{s}	−09° 46′ 25″	3.33	152.8	K0III	b	21.9		536		0.13	2004
HD 164427	Telescopium	18^{h} 04^{m} 43^{s}	−59° 12′ 35″	6.89	127.52	G4IV	b	46		108.55	0.46	0.55	2000
SCR 1845-6357	Pavo	18^{h} 45^{m} 07^{s}	−63° 57′ 43″	17.4	12.57	M8.5V	B	40-50			4.1		2006
COROT-3	Aquila	19^{h} 28^{m} 13^{s}	+00° 07′ 19″	13.3	2220	G0V	b	21.66	1.01	4.2568	0.057	0	2008
V921 Scorpii	Scorpius	16^{h} 59^{m} 07.0^{s}	−42° 42′ 09.0″	11.0	4833	B0IVe	b	60			835		2019
15 Sagittae	Sagitta	20^{h} 04^{m} 06^{s}	+17° 04′ 13″	5.80	57.7	G1V+L4-5	B	65			14		2002
Zeta Delphini	Delphinus	20^{h} 35^{m} 19^{s}	+14° 40′ 27″	4.65	220	A3V+L5	B	55			910		2014
HD 202206	Capricornus	21^{h} 14^{m} 58^{s}	–20° 47′ 20″	8.08	151.14	G6V	b	17.4		255.87	0.83	0.435	2000
Koenigstuhl1	Phoenix	00^{h} 21^{m} 10.74^{s}	–42° 45′ 40.2″	15.3	87.4	M5.5V+L0.6V	B	51.88 ±3.6	1.18		2,083.4		1998
HD 126053	Virgo	14^{h} 23^{m} 15.28^{s}	+01° 14′ 29.6″	6.3	56.9	G1+T8p	B	34.29 ±18.38	0.91		2,630		2012
47 Ophiuchi	Ophiuchus	17^{h} 26^{m} 37.88^{s}	−05° 05′ 11.8″	4.5	105.3	F3+L5.5	B	69.66 ±0.88	0.93		8,850		2014
Wolf 1130	Cygnus	20^{h} 05^{m} 02.20^{s}	+54° 26′ 03.2″	13.9	54.1	sdM3+ONe+sdT8	C	44.9	0.82		3,150		2013

== Confirmed brown dwarfs orbiting stellar remnants ==
A stellar remnant can be for example a white dwarf, a pulsar or a black hole. Objects with a mass of a brown dwarf, but with a history of mass-transfer might not be brown dwarfs. If they exist as a period bouncer around a white dwarf they are thought to once have been stars and are today "brown dwarf-like objects". Objects around black widow pulsars on the other hand are thought to be white dwarfs that lost mass to the pulsar and therefore will differ in composition and density compared to brown dwarfs. This list is sorted after the discovery year.

Star	Constellation	Right ascension	Declination	App. mag.	Distance (ly)	Spectral type	Brown dwarf	Mass (M_{J})	Radius (R_{J})	Orbital period (d)	Semimajor axis (AU)	Ecc.	Discovery year
GD 165	Boötes	14^{h} 24^{m} 39.144^{s}	9° 17′ 13.98″	14.6	103	D4A+L4	B	76.12 ±1.04	0.91		123		1988
WD 0137-349	Sculptor	01^{h} 39^{m} 43^{s}	−34° 42′ 39″	15.33	330	DA+L8	B	53		0.0803	0.0030	0	2006
PHL 5038	Aquarius	22^{h} 20^{m} 30.70^{s}	−00° 41′ 07.5″	17.3	240	DAZ+L8-9	B	73			66		2006
SDSS J1433 (mass transfer)	Boötes	14^{h} 33^{m} 17.79^{s}	+10° 11′ 23.49″	18.9	760	WD+L1	B	58 ±8		0.054			2008/2016
SDSS 1557	Serpens	15^{h} 57^{m} 20.77^{s}	+09° 16′ 24.6″	18.6	500	DAZ+L4	B	66+5 −7		0.095	0.003		2011/2017
QZ Librae (mass transfer)	Libra	15^{h} 36^{m} 15.98^{s}	−08° 39′ 07.52″	18.8	649	WD+T?	B	25-61		0.064			2018
BW Sculptoris (mass transfer)	Sculptor	23^{h} 53^{m} 00.87^{s}	−38° 51′ 46.66″	16.5	305	D+T	B	53.4 ±6.3		0.054	0.0027		1997/2023

== Unconfirmed brown dwarfs ==
Sorted by increasing right ascension of the parent star. Brown dwarfs within a system sorted by increasing orbital period.

Some brown dwarfs listed could still be massive planets.

Star	Constellation	Right ascension	Declination	App. mag.	Distance (ly)	Spectral type	Brown dwarf	Mass (M_{J})	Radius (R_{J})	Orbital period (d)	Semimajor axis (AU)	Ecc.	Discovery year
CM Draconis	Draco	16^{h} 34^{m} 27^{s}	+57° 09′ 00″	12.90	48	M4	b	64		73	0.27		1998
BD+20°2457	Leo	10^{h} 16^{m} 45^{s}	+19° 53′ 29″	9.75	652	K2II	b	21.42		379.63	1.45	0.15	2009
HD 3346	Andromeda	00^{h} 36^{m} 46^{s}	+44° 29′ 19″	5.16	655.58	K5III	c	60		650	2.5		1996
HD 104304	Virgo	12^{h} 00^{m} 44^{s}	−10° 26′ 46″	5.54	42.1	G9	b	17.2		2,752		0.38	2007
HD 154857	Ara	17^{h} 11^{m} 16^{s}	−56° 40′ 51″	7.25	220	G5V	c	18.4		2,900		>0.25	2007
Gliese 22 B	Cassiopeia	00^{h} 32^{m} 27^{s}	+67° 14′ 09″	10.38	326	M2.5V	b	16		~5,500		0	2008

== Field brown dwarfs ==
Data updated from and merged from previous tables

Brown dwarf	Constellation	Right ascension	Declination	App. mag.	Distance (ly)	Spectral type	Mass (M_{J})	Radius (R_{J})	Discovery year
2MASS 0036+1821	Pisces	0^{h} 36^{m} 16.17^{s}	18° 21′ 10.4″	12.47	28.6	L3.5	42	0.94	2000
CFBDS J005910.90–011401.3	Cetus	0^{h} 59^{m} 10.83^{s}	−1° 14′ 1.3″	18.08	30	T8.5	23		2013
DENIS-P J020529.0−115925A	Cetus	2^{h} 5^{m} 29.401^{s}	−11° 59′ 29.67″		65	L5.5			1997
DENIS-P J020529.0−115925B	Cetus	2^{h} 5^{m} 29.401^{s}	−11° 59′ 29.67″		65	L8			1997
DENIS-P J020529.0−115925C	Cetus	2^{h} 5^{m} 29.401^{s}	−11° 59′ 29.67″		65	T0			1997
2MASS J02431371−2453298	Fornax	2^{h} 43^{m} 13.71^{s}	−24° 53′ 29.8″		35	T6	33	0.99	2002
WISE J0254+0223	Cetus	2^{h} 54^{m} 9.45^{s}	2° 23′ 59.1″	16.01	24	T8	65	1.9	n/a
DEN 0255-4700	Eridanus	2^{h} 55^{m} 3.57^{s}	−47° 0′ 50.9″	22.92	16.2	L8	80	0.97	2006
LP 944-20	Fornax	3^{h} 39^{m} 35.22^{s}	−35° 25′ 44″	10.725	20.9	M9β	73	1.43	n/a
2MASP J0345432+254023		3^{h} 45^{m} 43.16^{s}	25° 40′ 23.3″		88	L0	74	1.05	1997
Teide 1	Taurus	3^{h} 47^{m} 18^{s}	+24° 22′ 31″		380	M8	55	3.78	1995
2MASS J03552337+1133437	Taurus	3^{h} 55^{m} 23.37^{s}	11° 33′ 43.7″	14.05	29.8	L5γ	20	1.32	2006
2MASS J04151954−0935066	Eridanus	4^{h} 15^{m} 19.54^{s}	−9° 35′ 6.6″	15.7	18.6	T8	30	0.95	2002
2MASS J04390101-2353083	Eridanus	4^{h} 39^{m} 1.01^{s}	−23° 53′ 8.3″		29.5	L6.5	48	0.97	2003
2MASS J04414489+2301513		4^{h} 41^{m} 44.9^{s}	23° 1′ 58.07″		470	M8.5	19		2010
2MASS J0523−1403	Lepus	5^{h} 23^{m} 38.22^{s}	−14° 3′ 2.2″		40	L2.5	68	1.01	n/a
2MASS 0532+8246	Camelopardalis	5^{h} 32^{m} 53.46^{s}	82° 46′ 46.5″		81	L7	83		2018
UGPS J072227.51-054031.2	Monoceros	7^{h} 22^{m} 27.6^{s}	−05° 40′ 38.4″		13.4	T9	26	0.98	2010
DENIS J081730.0-615520	Carina	8^{h} 17^{m} 30.01^{s}	−61° 55′ 15.8″	13.6	16.1	T6	44	0.94	2010
DENIS J082303.1−491201A	Vela	8^{h} 23^{m} 3.13^{s}	−49° 12′ 1.3″		67	L1.5	44		2006
DENIS J082303.1−491201B	Vela	8^{h} 23^{m} 3.13^{s}	−49° 12′ 1.3″		67	L5.5	28		2006
2MASSW J0920122+351742	Lynx	9^{h} 20^{m} 12.23^{s}	35° 17′ 42.9″		95	L6.5			2000
2MASSI J0937347+293142	Leo	9^{h} 37^{m} 34.87^{s}	29° 31′ 40.9″		20.0	T6p	42	0.94	2002
2MASS 0939−2448	Antlia	9^{h} 39^{m} 35.48^{s}	−24° 48′ 27.9″	16.83	17.4	T8	32	0.95	2005
Luhman 16B	Vela	10^{h} 49^{m} 18.91^{s}	−53° 19′ 10″		6.516	T1	43	1.02	2013
Luhman 16A	Vela	10^{h} 49^{m} 18.91^{s}	−53° 19′ 10″		6.516	L8	40	1.01	2013
DENIS-P J1058.7−1548	Crater	10^{h} 58^{m} 47.87^{s}	−15° 48′ 17.2″	14.155	49	L3	64	1.00	1997
Cha 110913-773444	Chamaeleon	11^{h} 9^{m} 14^{s}	–77° 34′ 45″	21.59	163	L	8	1.8	2005
OTS 44	Chamaeleon	11^{h} 10^{m} 12^{s}	–76° 32′ 13″		554	M9.5V	15		2005
2MASS J11145133−2618235	Hydra	11^{h} 14^{m} 51.33^{s}	−26° 18′ 23.5″	15.86	18.2	T7.5	33	0.96	2005
DENIS-P J1228.2-1547	Corvus	12^{h} 28^{m} 15.23^{s}	−15° 47′ 34.2″	14.38	66	L5			1999
2M 1237+6526	Draco	12^{h} 37^{m} 39.19^{s}	65° 26′ 14.8″	16.05	45.6	T6.5	41	0.94	2003
Kelu-1A	Hydra	13^{h} 5^{m} 40.2^{s}	−25° 41′ 6″		61	L2	63	0.98	1997
Kelu-1B	Hydra	13^{h} 5^{m} 40.2^{s}	−25° 41′ 6″		61	L4	58	0.98	1997
LHS 2924	Boötes	14^{h} 28^{m} 43.23^{s}	+33° 10′ 39.1″	19.74	38.5	M9V	76	1.06	
CFBDSIR 1458+10A	Boötes	14^{h} 58^{m} 29.0^{s}	+10° 13′ 43″	19.83	104	T9	11.1	1.5	2010
CFBDSIR 1458+10B	Boötes	14^{h} 58^{m} 29.0^{s}	+10° 13′ 43″	21.85	104	Y0	9	1.3	2010
TVLM 513-46546	Boötes	15^{h} 1^{m} 8.18^{s}	+22° 50′ 2″	15.09	35.1	M8.5V	75	1.05	n/a
2MASS 1503+2525	Boötes	15^{h} 3^{m} 19.61^{s}	25° 25′ 19.6″		20.7	T5	44	0.94	2003
2MASS 1507−1627	Libra	15^{h} 7^{m} 47.69^{s}	−16° 27′ 38.6″	19	23.9	L5	60	0.99	2000
SDSSp J162414.37+002915.6	Serpens	16^{h} 24^{m} 14.36^{s}	0° 29′ 15.8″		36	T6	43	0.94	1999
LSR J1835+3259	Lyra	18^{h} 35^{m} 37.9^{s}	32° 59′ 54.5″	18.27	18.5	M8.5	77	1.07	2003
PSO J318.5−22	Capricornus	21^{h} 14^{m} 8.02^{s}	−22° 51′ 35.8″		80	L7VL-G	6.5	1.53	2013
2MASS J21392676+0220226	Aquarius	21^{h} 39^{m} 26.77^{s}	2° 20′ 22.7″	14.71	32.1	T1.5	46	0.96	n/a
2MASS J22282889-4310262	Grus	22^{h} 28^{m} 28.89^{s}	−43° 10′ 26.2″	15.66	35	T6	42	0.94	2013
WISE 0146+4234	Andromeda	1^{h} 46^{m} 56.66^{s}	42° 34′ 10.0″	18.71	20.5	Y0			2010
WISE 0226-0211	Cetus	2^{h} 26^{m} 24^{s}	−2° 11′ 42.51″	18.94	91	T7			2010
WISE 0313+7807	Cepheus	3^{h} 13^{m} 26.02^{s}	78° 7′ 44.4″	17.65	28	T8.5			2010
WISE 0316+4307	Perseus	3^{h} 16^{m} 24.35^{s}	43° 7′ 9.1″		106.3	T8			2010
WISE 0350-5658	Reticulum	3^{h} 50^{m} 0.32^{s}	−56° 58′ 30.2″	22.8	17.7	Y1			2010
WISE 0359-5401	Reticulum	3^{h} 59^{m} 34.06^{s}	−54° 1′ 54.6″	21.56	19.2	Y0			2010
WISE 0410+1502	Taurus	4^{h} 10^{m} 22.79^{s}	15° 2′ 47.47″	19.25	20	Y0	6	1.17	2010
WISE 0458+6434A	Camelopardalis	4^{h} 58^{m} 53.93^{s}	64° 34′ 52.72″	17.50	35.9	T8.5	15	4.2	2010
WISE 0458+6434B	Camelopardalis	4^{h} 58^{m} 53.93^{s}	64° 34′ 52.72″	18.48	35.9	T9.5	10	3.8	2010
WISE 0535-7500	Mensa	5^{h} 35^{m} 16.8^{s}	−75° 0′ 24.9″	21.1	47	Y1			2010
WISE 0607+2429	Gemini	6^{h} 7^{m} 38.65^{s}	24° 29′ 53.5″	14.22	25.4	L8			2010
WISE 0647-6232	Pictor	6^{h} 47^{m} 23.23^{s}	−62° 32′ 39.7″	22.65	28	Y1			2010
WISE 0713-2917	Canis Major	7^{h} 13^{m} 22.55^{s}	−29° 17′ 51.9″	19.64	23.2	Y0			2010
WISE 0734-7157	Volans	7^{h} 34^{m} 44.02^{s}	−71° 57′ 44.0″	20.41	34.9	Y0			2010
WISE 1217+1626A	Coma Berenices	12^{h} 17^{m} 56.96^{s}	16° 26′ 39.98″	18.59	34.2	T9	12		2010
WISE 1217+1626B	Coma Berenices	12^{h} 17^{m} 56.96^{s}	16° 26′ 39.98″	20.26	34.2	Y0	6		2010
WISE 1405+5534	Ursa Major	14^{h} 5^{m} 18.27^{s}	55° 34′ 21.22″	20.2	25.3	Y0 pec	30	0.86	2010
WISE 1506+7027	Ursa Minor	15^{h} 6^{m} 49.89^{s}	70° 27′ 36.23″	14.33	11.1	T6			2010
WISE 1541-2250	Libra	15^{h} 41^{m} 51.57^{s}	−22° 50′ 25.03″	21.16	20	Y0.5			2010
WISE 1639-6847	Triangulum Australe	16^{h} 39^{m} 40.83^{s}	−68° 47′ 38.6″		16.3	Y0			2010
WISE 1711+3500	Hercules	17^{h} 11^{m} 4.59^{s}	35° 0′ 36.73″	17.89	60.3	T8			2010
WISE 1738+2732	Hercules	17^{h} 38^{m} 35.54^{s}	27° 32′ 58.78″	19.47	20	Y0			2010
WISE 1741+2553	Hercules	17^{h} 41^{m} 24.22^{s}	25° 53′ 18.96″	16.53	18.9	T9			2010
WISE 1828+2650	Lyra	18^{h} 28^{m} 31.10^{s}	26° 50′ 37.79″	23.57	36	Y2			2010
WISE 1841+7000	Draco	18^{h} 41^{m} 24.75^{s}	70° 0′ 38.54″	17.24	131.1	T5			2010
WISE 1952+7240	Draco	19^{h} 52^{m} 46.61^{s}	72° 40′ 0.61″	15.09	44.4	T4			2010
WISE 2056+1459	Delphinus	20^{h} 56^{m} 28.88^{s}	14° 59′ 53.68″	19.21	24.5	Y0			2010
WISE 2220-3628	Grus	22^{h} 20^{m} 55.31^{s}	−36° 28′ 17.4″	20.38	26.4	Y0			2010
WISEA 1101+5400	Ursa Major	11^{h} 01^{m} 25.95^{s}	+54° 00′ 52.8″		111	T5.5			2017
2M1510	Libra	15^{h} 10^{m} 47.47^{s}	−28° 18′ 18.3″		120	M9γ+M9γ			2002

== Former brown dwarfs ==
Star	Constellation	Right ascension	Declination	App. mag.	Distance (ly)	Spectral type	Brown dwarf	Mass (M_{J})	Radius (R_{J})	Orbital period (d)	Semimajor axis (AU)	Ecc.	Discovery year
L 34-26	Chamaeleon	07^{h} 49^{m} 12.71^{s}	–76° 42′ 06.5″		35.6	M3Ve	COCONUTS-2b	6.3+1.5 −1.9		400,000,000	7506^{+5205}_{−2060}		2011

== See also ==
- Lists of astronomical objects
- List of exoplanets
