= Pi Cancri =

The Bayer designation π Cancri (Pi Cancri) is shared by two stars in the constellation Cancer:

- 81 Cancri, or π^{1} Cancri (or π^{1} Cnc, Pi^{1} Cancri, Pi^{1} Cnc)
- 82 Cancri, or π^{2} Cancri (π^{2} Cnc, Pi^{2} Cancri, Pi^{2} Cnc)

== See also ==
- Rho Cancri
