= Rho Cancri =

The Bayer designation ρ Cancri (Rho Cancri) is shared by two stars in the constellation Cancer:

- 55 Cancri, or Rho^{1} Cancri (ρ^{1} Cnc)
- 58 Cancri, or Rho^{2} Cancri (ρ^{2} Cnc)

In Johann Bode’s Uranographia, the designation Rho Cancri is applied to five different stars:

- ρ^{1} Cancri is 53 Cancri
- ρ^{2} Cancri is 55 Cancri
- ρ^{3} Cancri is 58 Cancri
- ρ^{4} Cancri is 67 Cancri
- ρ^{5} Cancri is 70 Cancri

Bode’s superscripted letters are now rarely used though, so the designations have been reverted to the original 2 stars.

== See also ==
- Pi Cancri
