= WISE 1800+0134 =

Brown dwarf in the constellation Ophiuchus

WISEP J180026.60+013453.1
Observation data Epoch 2010.22 Equinox J2000
- Constellation: Ophiuchus
- Right ascension: 18^{h} 00^{m} 26.60^{s}
- Declination: 01° 34′ 53.1″

Characteristics
- Spectral type: L7.5
- Apparent magnitude (J (2MASS filter system)): 14.30 ± 0.04
- Apparent magnitude (H (2MASS filter system)): 13.12 ± 0.04
- Apparent magnitude (K_{S} (2MASS filter system)): 12.42 ± 0.03

Astrometry
Proper motion (μ)	RA: 183.734 mas/yr Dec.: -384.108 mas/yr
Parallax (π)	128.0546±0.5101 mas
Distance	25.5 ± 0.1 ly (7.81 ± 0.03 pc)

Details
Mass	0.045±0.015 M_{☉}
Luminosity	10^{−4.53 ± 0.04} L_{☉}
Temperature	1430 ± 100 K
Rotation	9.3 hours
Rotational velocity (v sin i)	13.5±0.5 km/s
Age	0.9±0.6 Gyr

Other designations
- WISEP J180026.60+013453.1; W1800+0134; 2MASS J18002648+0134565; DENIS J180026.4+013457; DENIS-P J180026.4+013457

Database references
SIMBAD	data

WISEP J180026.60+013453.1 (designation is abbreviated to W1800+0134) is a brown dwarf of spectral class L7.5, located in constellation Ophiuchus at approximately 26 light-years from Earth.

== Discovery ==
WISEP J180026.60+013453.1 was discovered in 2011 by Gizis et al. from data, collected by Wide-field Infrared Survey Explorer (WISE) Earth-orbiting satellite — NASA infrared-wavelength 40 centimetres (16 in)) space telescope, which mission lasted from December 2009 to February 2011. There are also precovery identifications of this object in Two Micron All-Sky Survey (2MASS) data (observed on 2000 September 23) and in the 3rd release of the DENIS database (close in time to the 2MASS observation). On 2011 June 22 Gizis et al. had conducted near-infrared spectroscopy with SpeX spectrograph, mounted on the 3 m Infrared Telescope Facility (IRTF), located at the Mauna Kea Observatory in Hawaii. In 2011 Gizis et al. published a paper in The Astronomical Journal, where they presented discovery of a newfound by WISE L-type brown dwarf WISEP J180026.60+013453.1 (a single discovery, presented in the article).

== Physical properties ==
WISEP J180026.60+013453.1 has temperature 1430 ± 100 K and luminosity 10^{−4.5 ± 0.3} Solar luminosities (the estimates are based on the object's spectral class (L7.5)). Mass estimates, determined from this temperature, are 0.04, (Note: For an assumed age 0.5 Gyr.) 0.05, (Note: For an assumed age 1 Gyr.) and 0.074 (Note: For an assumed age 5 Gyr.) Solar masses, anyway below the hydrogen-burning limit, which implies that WISEP J180026.60+013453.1 is not a true star, but only a substellar object, that is a brown dwarf.

== Failed test for binarity ==
WISEP J180026.60+013453.1 was tested spectroscopically for L + T binarity, and the binarity was not revealed. Common proper motion companions also were not found.

== See also ==
- List of star systems within 25–30 light-years
- WISE 0031-3840 (L2 pec (blue))
- WISE 0049+0441 (L9)
- WISE 0206+2640 (L9 pec (red))
- WISE 1311+3629 (L5 pec (blue))
- WISE 1348+6603 (L9)
- WISE 1647+5632 (L9 pec (red))
- WISE 1830+4542 (L9)
- WISE 2327-2730 (L9)
- WISE 0607+2429 (L8)
- WISE 0106+1518 (M8 pec)
