= CoRoT-20b =

Exoplanet

Discovery
- Discovered by: CoRoT space telescope
- Detection method: Transit

Orbital characteristics
- Semi-major axis: 0.0902 AU (13,490,000 km)
- Eccentricity: 0.562
- Orbital period (sidereal): 9.24285 d
- Inclination: 88.21
- Star: CoRoT-20

Physical characteristics
- Mean radius: 0.84 R_{J}
- Mass: 4.24M_{J}
- Temperature: 1002 K

CoRoT-20b is a transiting exoplanet found by the CoRoT space telescope in 2011.

It is a hot Jupiter-sized planet orbiting CoRoT-20. It is a young planet, with an estimated age between 0.06 and 0.14 Gyr. Its density (8.87 g/cm^{3}) is remarkably high for its mass, making CoRoT-20b one of the most compact gas giants.

== Host star ==
The host star, CoRoT-20, is a G2V star with an effective temperature of 5,880 K (5,610 °C; 10,120 °F), a mass of 1.14 M_{☉}, a radius of 0.92 R_{☉}, and an above-solar metallicity. It also hosts another exoplanet, CoRoT-20c.

== See also ==
- CoRoT-14b
- WASP-18b
