= WISE 0458+6434 =

Ultracool brown dwarf binary

WISEPC J045853.90+643451.9
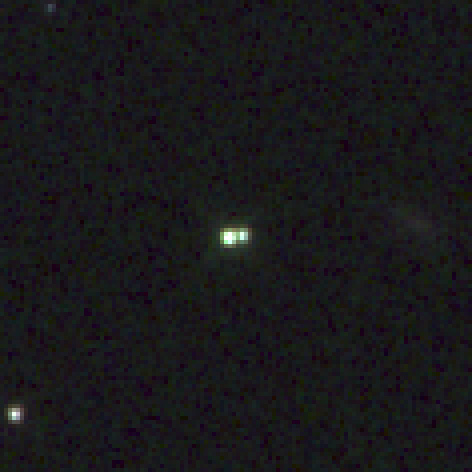
- WISE 0458+6434 with the Hubble Space Telescope, with the component A on the left and the component B being the fainter object on the right.

Observation data Epoch MJD 55453.42 Equinox J2000
- Constellation: Camelopardalis
- Right ascension: 04^{h} 58^{m} 53.93^{s}
- Declination: +64° 34′ 52.72″

Characteristics

Whole system
- Apparent magnitude (Y (FanCam)): 18.34 ± 0.07
- Apparent magnitude (J (2MASS filter system)): 17.47 ± 0.05
- Apparent magnitude (H (2MASS filter system)): 17.41 ± 0.06

Component A
- Spectral type: T8.5
- Apparent magnitude (J (MKO filter system)): 17.50 ± 0.07
- Apparent magnitude (H (MKO filter system)): 17.77 ± 0.11

Component B
- Spectral type: T9.5
- Apparent magnitude (J (MKO filter system)): 18.48 ± 0.07
- Apparent magnitude (H (MKO filter system)): 18.79 ± 0.11

Astrometry
Proper motion (μ)	RA: 136 ± 45 mas/yr Dec.: 317 ± 22 mas/yr
Parallax (π)	108.3±1.7 mas
Distance	30.1 ± 0.5 ly (9.2 ± 0.1 pc)

Orbit
Primary	A
Name	B
Period (P)	43+7 −12 yr
Semi-major axis (a)	5+0.3 −0.6 au
Eccentricity (e)	0.18+0.09 −0.18
Inclination (i)	76.5+1.5 −2.3°

Details

Component A
Mass	57+25 −28 M_{Jup}
Radius	0.807+0.008 −0.007 R_{Jup}
Surface gravity (log g)	5.0–5.5 (Note: This estimate is related to WISE 0458+6434 (not to component A individually), when its binarity was not yet uncovered.) cgs
Temperature	600 (Note: For an assumed system age of 1 Gyr.) K
Metallicity	1.35+0.19 −0.15 ([Fe/H])

Component B
Mass	14+21 −22 M_{Jup}
Radius	0.807+0.008 −0.007 R_{Jup}
Temperature	500 K

Position (relative to A)
Component	B
Epoch of observation	UT 2011 August 29
Angular distance	455.1 ± 4.2 mas
Position angle	322.9 ± 0.4°
Projected separation	5 ± 0.4 AU

Other designations
- WISEPC J045853.90+643451.9; WISEPA J045853.89+643452.9; WISE J0458+6434; WISE 0458+6434; WISEPC J0458+64

Database references
SIMBAD	data

WISEPC J045853.90+643451.9 (designation is abbreviated to WISE 0458+6434) is a binary system of two (A and B) ultracool brown dwarfs of spectral classes T8.5 and T9.5, respectively, located in constellation Camelopardalis at approximately 47 ly from Earth.

== History of observations ==
=== Discovery ===
WISE 0458+6434 A was discovered in 2010 by A. Mainzer et al. from data, collected by Wide-field Infrared Survey Explorer (WISE) Earth-orbiting satellite—NASA infrared-wavelength 40 cm (16 in) space telescope, which mission lasted from December 2009 to February 2011.

In 2010 Mainzer et al. had conducted follow-up observations of WISE 0458+6434:

on 2010 March 17 (UT) YJH photometry with FanCam, an infrared imager operating at the University of Virginia’s Fan Mountain 31 in telescope;
on 2010 March 19 (UT) 1.5–2.3 μm spectroscopy with LUCIFER near-infrared camera/spectrograph at the Large Binocular Telescope (LBT);
on 2010 Sep 12 (UT) 0.8–2.5 μm spectroscopy with SpeX on the 3.0 m NASA Infrared Telescope Facility on Mauna Kea.

In early 2011 Mainzer et al. published a paper in The Astrophysical Journal, where they presented discovery of one new found by WISE brown dwarf — ultra-cool object WISE 0458+6434. This object became the first brown dwarf, found by WISE.

Several months later, also in 2011, Kirkpatrick et al. published a paper in The Astrophysical Journal Supplement, where they presented characteristics of 104 first discovered by WISE brown dwarf systems—98 new found systems and six systems, presented in published earlier papers (one in Mainzer et al. (2011), and five in Burgasser et al. (2011)), among which also was WISE 0458+6434.

=== Discovery of the companion ===
WISE 0458+6434 B was discovered in 2011 by Gelino et al., when they examined for binarity nine brown dwarfs using Laser Guide Star Adaptive Optics system (LGS-AO) on Keck II telescope on Mauna Kea; seven of these nine brown dwarfs were also newfound, and two were discovered before, including WISE 0458+6434. These observations had indicated that two of these nine brown dwarfs, including WISE 0458+6434, are binary. Angular separation of WISE 0458+6434 components was 80 mas. Component B is also of late T-type—T9.5 (initially was estimated as T9).

== Distance ==
Currently the most accurate distance estimate of WISE 0458+6434 is a trigonometric parallax, measured using Spitzer Space Telescope and published in 2013 by Trent Dupuy and Adam Kraus: 0.070 ± 0.019 arcsec, corresponding to a distance 14.3^{+5.3}_{−3.0} pc, or 46.6^{+17.4}_{−9.9} ly.

WISE 0458+6434 distance estimates

Source	Parallax, mas	Distance, pc	Distance, ly	Ref.
Mainzer et al. (2011) (spectrophotometric)		6–8	19.6–26.1	
Mainzer et al. (2011) (photometric)		9.0 ± 1.9	29.4 ± 6.2	
Mainzer et al. (2011) (combined)		6–10	19.6–32.6	
Kirkpatrick et al. (2011) (spectrophotometric, assuming a single source)		~7.3	~23.8	
Gelino et al. (2011), (according to Kirkpatrick et al. (2011), Appendix I.)		12.3 ± 2.3	40.1 ± 7.5	
Gelino et al. (2011)		10.5 ± 1.4	34.2 ± 4.6	
Burgasser et al. (2012) (component A)		10.5 ± 1.8	34.2 ± 5.9	
Burgasser et al. (2012) (component B)		11.2 ± 2.2	36.5 ± 7.2	
Burgasser et al. (2012) (combined A + B)		~11	~35.9	
Dupuy & Kraus (2013)	**70 ± 19** (Note: Relative parallax.)	**14.3^{+5.3}_{−3.0}**	**46.6^{+17.4}_{−9.9}**	

Non-trigonometric distance estimates are marked in italic. The best estimate is marked in bold.

== Space motion ==
WISE 0458+6434 has proper motion of about 347 milliarcseconds per year.

WISE 0458+6434 proper motion estimates

Source	μ, mas/yr	P. A., °	μ_{RA}, mas/yr	μ_{DEC}, mas/yr	Ref.
Mainzer et al. (2011)	253	51	196.8 ± 29.1	159.3 ± 29.1	
Kirkpatrick et al. (2011)	219	57	185 ± 141	118 ± 149	
Dupuy & Kraus (2013)	**347 ± 26**	**23 ± 7**	**136 ± 45**	**317 ± 22**	

The most accurate estimates are marked in bold.

== Physical properties ==
The brown dwarfs' temperature estimates are 600 K, or 327 °C (A) and 500 K, or 227 °C (B), both cooler than Venus.

In 2025 an analysis of the James Webb Space Telescope spectrum was presented. The analysis found the expected molecules water vapor (H_{2}O), methane (CH_{4}) and ammonia (NH_{3}) in the spectrum of the binary. The analysis found hydrogen cyanide (HCN) and acetylene (C_{2}H_{2}) in the spectrum of the binary. The detection of hydrogen cyanide is expected in high surface gravity brown dwarfs with a high vertical mixing. The high vertical mixing would however lead to a detectable amount of carbon monoxide (CO), which is not detected. Acetylene is an unexpected detection. It occurs in Jupiter and is claimed to be present in HD 209458 b, but in these instances it is formed via photochemistry under the influence of UV-light. WISE 0458+6434 does not orbit a star and the acetylene occurs deeper in the atmosphere. Other processes could be responsible for the production of acetylene, such as aurora or lightning. There is some discrpancy in the mass. The dynamical mass, determined from the orbit, finds a total mass of 70+15
−24 M_{J}. A derived total mass of 132+38
−28 M_{J} from log g and radius is much higher than this dynamical mass and higher than expected from evolutionary models.

=== NH_{3} in the spectrum of component B ===
According proposed by Cushing et al. in 2011 T/Y transition standard, WISE J0458+6434 B does not relate to Y-type. However, its spectrum has feature similar to those in the spectra of the Y0 dwarfs WISE 1405+5534 and WISE 1738+2732, which were tentatively attributed to NH_{3} (ammonia) absorption—a compelling evidence for NH_{3} absorption.

== See also ==
The other five earliest brown dwarf discoveries from data collected by WISE:

- published by Burgasser et al. (2011):
  - WISE 1617+1807 (T8, young and cloudy)
  - WISE 1812+2721 (T8.5:, cloudless)
  - WISE 2018-7423 (T7, possibly cloudy)
  - WISE 2313-8037 (T8, also young and cloudy)
  - WISE 2359-7335 (T5.5, cloudless)

The other eight objects, checked for binarity by Gelino et al. (2011) on Keck II:

- binarity found:
  - WISE 1841+7000 (T5 + T5, newfound)
- binarity not found:
  - WISE 0750+2725 (T8.5, newfound (Note: Presented in Gelino et al. (2011), but this is not mentioned in Kirkpatrick et al. (2011) and Kirkpatrick et al. (2012) — according these two articles, the only discovery paper of WISE 0750+2725 is Kirkpatrick et al. (2011).))
  - WISE 1322–2340 (T8, newfound)
  - WISE 1614+1739 (T9, newfound)
  - WISE 1617+1807 (T8, discovered before by Burgasser et al. (2011))
  - WISE 1627+3255 (T6, newfound)
  - WISE 1653+4444 (T8, newfound)
  - WISE 1741+2553 (T9, newfound)
