= HD 136118 =

Star in the constellation Serpens

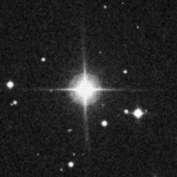
- Telescope image of HD 136118

Observation data Epoch J2000 Equinox ICRS
- Constellation: Serpens
- Right ascension: 15^{h} 18^{m} 55.47227^{s}
- Declination: −01° 35′ 32.5926″
- Apparent magnitude (V): 6.93

Characteristics
- Evolutionary stage: main sequence
- Spectral type: F7V
- B−V color index: 0.553±0.007

Astrometry
Radial velocity (R_{v})	−3.07±0.13 km/s
Proper motion (μ)	RA: −123.024(31) mas/yr Dec.: 22.180(30) mas/yr
Parallax (π)	19.8116±0.0341 mas
Distance	164.6 ± 0.3 ly (50.48 ± 0.09 pc)
Absolute magnitude (M_{V})	3.60

Details
Mass	1.84±0.23 M_{☉}
Radius	1.70±0.02 R_{☉}
Luminosity	3.717±0.018 L_{☉}
Surface gravity (log g)	4.08 cgs
Temperature	6,148+38 −43 K
Metallicity [Fe/H]	−0.06±0.01 dex
Rotational velocity (v sin i)	8.5 km/s
Age	3.5±0.4 Gyr

Other designations
- BD−01° 3045, HD 136118, HIP 74948, SAO 140452

Database references
SIMBAD	data

HD 136118 is a star in the Serpens Caput section of the constellation Serpens. The star is too dim to be readily visible to the naked eye, having an apparent visual magnitude of 6.93. It is located at a distance of 165 light years from the Sun based on parallax, and is drifting closer with a radial velocity of −3 km/s.

This object is an F-type main-sequence star with a stellar classification of F7V. The absolute visual magnitude of this star suggests that it has begun to evolve away from the main sequence. The abundances of the stellar atmosphere are similar to the Sun, and it has only a modest level of chromospheric activity. HD 136118 has 84% more mass compared to the Sun, and is 70% larger in radius. The star is an estimated 3.5 billion years old and is spinning with a projected rotational velocity of 8.5 km/s.

== Brown dwarf companion ==
The astronomer Debra Fischer discovered a substellar companion, originally thought to be a very massive exoplanet, which was announced on February 7, 2002. Designated HD 136118 b, it is orbiting the host star with a period of 3.25 years. This object has a minimum mass of 11.9 M_{J}. On November 25, 2009, its inclination was calculated to be 163.1° and its true mass 42 M_{J}, classifying it as a brown dwarf. Later studies in 2022 and 2023 found true masses of about 13-16 M_{J}, closer to the minimum mass, but still classifying the companion as a brown dwarf by most definitions.

Due to its high mass the object is likely to be very hot and possibly glowing faintly. The orbit of the object has a semimajor axis of 1.45 astronomical units from the parent star, taking 1,188 days (3.25 years) to complete one eccentric orbit.

The HD 136118 planetary system
Companion (in order from star)	Mass	Semimajor axis (AU)	Orbital period (years)	Eccentricity	Inclination (°)	Radius
b	16.5+1.7 −1.8 M_{J}	2.353+0.046 −0.045	3.262+0.053 −0.051	0.35+0.027 −0.026	134.0+4.7 −7.5	—

== See also ==
- List of brown dwarfs
