= WISEPA J184124.74+700038.0 =

Brown dwarf binary

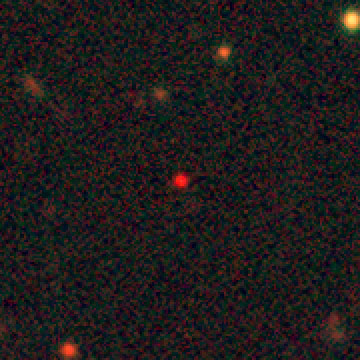
- WISE 1841+7000; Credit: legacy surveys

Observation data Epoch MJD 55590.80 Equinox J2000
- Constellation: Draco
- Right ascension: 18^{h} 41^{m} 24.75^{s}
- Declination: 70° 00′ 38.54″

Characteristics

Whole system
- Apparent magnitude (J (2MASS filter system)): 16.800 ± 0.035
- Apparent magnitude (J (MKO filter system)): 16.64 ± 0.03
- Apparent magnitude (H (2MASS filter system)): 16.912 ± 0.082
- Apparent magnitude (H (MKO filter system)): 16.99 ± 0.04
- Apparent magnitude (K_{S} (2MASS filter system)): >15.626

Component A
- Spectral type: T5
- Apparent magnitude (J (MKO filter system)): 17.24 ± 0.10
- Apparent magnitude (H (MKO filter system)): 17.73 ± 0.10

Component B
- Spectral type: T5
- Apparent magnitude (J (MKO filter system)): 17.57 ± 0.13
- Apparent magnitude (H (MKO filter system)): 17.75 ± 0.10

Astrometry
Proper motion (μ)	RA: -104 ± 25 mas/yr Dec.: 527 ± 28 mas/yr
Distance	131.1 ± 16 ly (40.2 ± 4.9 pc)

Orbit
Primary	A
Name	B
Period (P)	~11 (Note: For an assumed system age of 1 Gyr.) yr

Details

Component A
Mass	≈60 M_{Jup}

Component B
Mass	≈60 M_{Jup}

Position (relative to A)
Component	B
Epoch of observation	UT 2010 Jul 1
Angular distance	70 ± 14 mas
Position angle	82 ± 9°
Projected separation	2.8 ± 0.7 AU

Other designations
- WISEPA J184124.74+700038.0; WISE J1841+7000

Database references
SIMBAD	data

WISEPA J184124.74+700038.0 (designation is abbreviated to WISE 1841+7000) is a binary system of brown dwarfs of spectral classes T5 + T5, located in constellation Draco at approximately 131 light-years from Earth. It is notable for being one of the first known binary brown dwarf systems.

== Discovery ==
WISE 1841+7000 was discovered in 2011 from data, collected by Wide-field Infrared Survey Explorer (WISE) Earth-orbiting satellite—NASA infrared-wavelength 40 cm (16 in) space telescope, which mission lasted from December 2009 to February 2011. WISE 1841+7000A has two discovery papers: Gelino et al. (2011) and Kirkpatrick et al. (2011). Gelino et al. examined for binarity nine brown dwarfs using Laser Guide Star Adaptive Optics system (LGS-AO) on Keck II telescope on Mauna Kea; seven of these nine brown dwarfs were also newfound, including WISE 1841+7000. These observations had indicated that two of these nine brown dwarfs, including WISE 1841+7000, are binary. Kirkpatrick et al. presented discovery of 98 new found by WISE brown dwarf systems with components of spectral types M, L, T and Y, among which also was WISE 1841+7000. (Note: These 98 brown dwarf systems are only among first, not all brown dwarf systems, discovered from data, collected by WISE: six discoveries were published earlier (however, also listed in Kirkpatrick et al. (2011)) in Mainzer et al. (2011) and Burgasser et al. (2011), and the other discoveries were published later.)

=== Discovery of companion ===
Component B of the system was discovered in 2011 Gelino et al. with Laser Guide Star Adaptive Optics system (LGS-AO) on Keck II telescope. It was presented in the same article as the component A.

== Distance ==
Trigonometric parallax of WISE 1841+7000 is not yet measured. Therefore, there are only distance estimates of this object, obtained by indirect spectrofotometric means (see table).

WISE 1841+7000 distance estimates

Source	Parallax, mas	Distance, pc	Distance, ly	Ref.
Gelino et al. (2011)		**40.2 ± 4.9**	**131.1 ± 16**	
Kirkpatrick et al. (2011) (not assuming binarity)		~22,4	~73,1	

Non-trigonometric distance estimates are marked in italic. The best estimate is marked in bold.

== See also ==
The other eight objects, checked for binarity by Gelino et al. (2011) on Keck II:

- binarity found:
  - WISE 0458+6434 (T8.5 + T9.5, component A discovered before by Mainzer et al. (2011))
- binarity not found:
  - WISE 0750+2725 (T8.5, newfound (Note: Presented in Gelino et al. (2011), but this is not mentioned in Kirkpatrick et al. (2011) and Kirkpatrick et al. (2012) — according to these two articles, the only discovery paper of WISE 0750+2725 is Kirkpatrick et al. (2011).))
  - WISE 1322-2340 (T8, newfound)
  - WISE 1614+1739 (T9, newfound)
  - WISE 1617+1807 (T8, discovered before by Burgasser et al. (2011))
  - WISE 1627+3255 (T6, newfound)
  - WISE 1653+4444 (T8, newfound)
  - WISE 1741+2553 (T9, newfound)
