= WISE 0607+2429 =

Star in the constellation Gemini

WISEP J060738.65+242953.4
Observation data Epoch 2010.30 Equinox J2000
- Constellation: Gemini
- Right ascension: 06^{h} 07^{m} 38.65^{s}
- Declination: +24° 29′ 53.5″

Characteristics
- Spectral type: L8
- Apparent magnitude (i): 20.02 ± 0.03
- Apparent magnitude (z): 16.94 ± 0.01
- Apparent magnitude (J (2MASS filter system)): 14.22 ± 0.03
- Apparent magnitude (H (2MASS filter system)): 13.04 ± 0.03
- Apparent magnitude (K_{S} (2MASS filter system)): 12.47 ± 0.02

Astrometry
Proper motion (μ)	RA: -472.871 mas/yr Dec.: -318.464 mas/yr
Parallax (π)	138.0616±0.5185 mas
Distance	23.62 ± 0.09 ly (7.24 ± 0.03 pc)

Details
Mass	0.03–0.072 M_{☉}
Luminosity	10^{−4.56 ± 0.09} L_{☉}
Temperature	1460 ± 90 K

Other designations
- WISEP J060738.65+242953.4; W0607+2429; 2MASSW J06073908+2429574; 2MASS J06073908+2429574; SDSS J060738.79+242954.4

Database references
SIMBAD	data

WISEP J060738.65+242953.4 (designation is abbreviated to W0607+2429) is a brown dwarf of spectral class L8, located in the constellation Gemini at approximately 25 light-years from Earth.

== Discovery ==
WISEP J060738.65+242953.4 was discovered in 2012 by Castro & Gizis from data collected by the Wide-field Infrared Survey Explorer (WISE) Earth-orbiting satellite—NASA infrared-wavelength 40 centimetres (16 in) space telescope, whose mission lasted from December 2009 to February 2011. There are also precovery identifications of this object in Two Micron All-Sky Survey (2MASS) data (observation epoch 1998.11) and in the Sloan Digital Sky Survey (SDSS) (DR7) (observation epoch 2006.98). In 2012 Castro & Gizis published a paper in The Astrophysical Journal, where they presented discovery of a newfound WISE L-type brown dwarf WISEP J060738.65+242953.4 (a single discovery, presented in the article).

== Distance ==
WISEP J060738.65+242953.4 distance estimates
Source	Parallax, mas	Distance, pc	Distance, ly	Ref.
Castro & Gizis (2012)		7.8^{+1.4}_{−1.2}	25.4^{+4.6}_{−3.9}	
Gaia DR3	138.0616	7.24±0.03	23.62±0.09	

Non-trigonometric distance estimates are marked in italic.

== Physical properties ==
WISEP J060738.65+242953.4 has a temperature of 1460 ± 90 K and bolometric luminosity of 10^{−4.56 ± 0.09} Solar luminosities (the estimates are based on the object's spectral class (L8)). Mass estimates, determined from this temperature, are from 0.03 (for an assumed age of 0.5 Gyr) to 0.072 (for an assumed age of 10 Gyr) Solar masses, below the hydrogen-burning limit, which implies that WISEP J060738.65+242953.4 is not a star, but a substellar object.

While some researchers had claimed that WISEP J060738.65+242953.4 may be viewed from its pole, or may rotate slowly because of its narrow spectral lines, later work demonstrated that both of these claims were unlikely. This latter study estimated that the size of the radio-emitting magnetosphere is approximately 10^{7} m.

== See also ==
- List of star systems within 20–25 light-years
- WISE 0031−3840 (L2 pec (blue))
- WISE 0049+0441 (L9)
- WISE 0206+2640 (L9 pec (red))
- WISE 1311+3629 (L5 pec (blue))
- WISE 1348+6603 (L9)
- WISE 1647+5632 (L9 pec (red))
- WISE 1830+4542 (L9)
- WISE 2327−2730 (L9)
- WISE 1800+0134 (L7.5)
- WISE 0106+1518 (M8 pec)
