= WISE J031624.35+430709.1 =

Star in the constellation Perseus

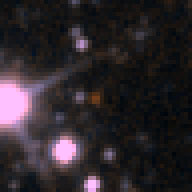
- WISE J031624.35+430709.1 is the faint orange object in the center Credit: unWISE

Observation data Epoch J2000 Equinox J2000
- Constellation: Perseus
- Right ascension: 03^{h} 16^{m} 24.35^{s}
- Declination: 43° 07′ 09.1″

Characteristics
- Spectral type: T8
- Apparent magnitude (H): 19.70 ± 0.09

Astrometry
| Proper motion (μ) | RA: 1.0±0.3 mas/yr Dec.: 372.4±1.5 mas/yr |
| Parallax (π) | 73.3±2.8 mas |
| Distance | 44 ± 2 ly (13.6 ± 0.5 pc) |

Other designations
- WISE J031624.35+430709.1

Database references
| SIMBAD | data |

WISE J031624.35+430709.1 is a brown dwarf of spectral class T8, located in constellation Perseus at approximately 106 light-years from Earth. It was one of the furthest T-class brown dwarfs known. In 2024 a T dwarf about 2 kpc distant, with a low-metallicity was discovered with the JWST. This brown dwarf is called JADES-GS-BD-9. Additional kpc distant T dwarfs were discovered by two teams, with UNCOVER-BD-1 (aka A2744-BD1) being 4.5 or 4.8 kpc distant.

== Discovery ==
WISE J031624.35+430709.1 was discovered in 2012 by Mace et al. from data, collected by Wide-field Infrared Survey Explorer (WISE) Earth-orbiting satellite—NASA infrared-wavelength 40 cm (16 in) space telescope, which mission lasted from December 2009 to February 2011. In March 2013, the discovery paper was published.

== Distance ==
Currently the most accurate distance estimate of WISE J031624.35+430709.1 is a trigonometric parallax, published in 2019 by Kirkpatrick et al.: 13.6+0.5
−0.5 pc, or 44.5+1.8
−1.6 ly.
