= WISEPA J174124.26+255319.5 =

Star in the constellation Hercules

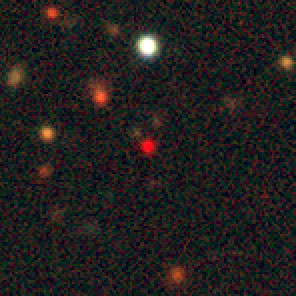
- WISE 1741+2553; Credit: legacy surveys

Observation data Epoch MJD 55451.80 Equinox J2000
- Constellation: Hercules
- Right ascension: 17^{h} 41^{m} 24.22^{s}
- Declination: 25° 53′ 18.96″

Characteristics
- Spectral type: T9
- Apparent magnitude (J (2MASS filter system)): 16.53±0.02
- Apparent magnitude (H (2MASS filter system)): 16.63±0.03
- Apparent magnitude (K_{S} (2MASS filter system)): 16.89±0.20

Astrometry
Proper motion (μ)	RA: −512.2 mas/yr Dec.: −1478.8 mas/yr
Parallax (π)	216.93±1.67 mas
Distance	15.0 ± 0.1 ly (4.61 ± 0.04 pc)

Details
Mass	34±2 M_{Jup}
Radius	0.851+0.009 −0.010 R_{Jup}
Luminosity	1.17+0.24 −0.20×10^{−6} L_{☉}
Surface gravity (log g)	4.00 cgs
Temperature	748±1 K
Metallicity	0 dex
Rotational velocity (v sin i)	21+16 −14 km/s

Other designations
- GJ 12549, WISEPC J174124.25+255319.5, WISEPA J174124.26+255319.5, WISE J1741+2553

Database references
SIMBAD	data
- Location of WISE 1741+2553 in the constellation Hercules

WISEPA J174124.26+255319.5 (designation is abbreviated to WISE 1741+2553) is a brown dwarf of spectral class T9, located in constellation Hercules at 15.0 light-years from Earth.

== History of observations ==
=== Discovery ===
WISE 1741+2553 was discovered in 2011 from data, collected by Wide-field Infrared Survey Explorer (WISE) Earth-orbiting satellite—NASA infrared-wavelength 40 cm (16 in) space telescope, which mission lasted from December 2009 to February 2011. WISE 1741+2553 has three discovery papers: Scholz et al. (2011), Gelino et al. (2011) and Kirkpatrick et al. (2011).

- Scholz et al. discovered two late T-type brown dwarfs, including WISE 1741+2553, using preliminary data release from WISE and follow-up near-infrared spectroscopy with LUCIFER1 near-infrared camera/spectrograph at the Large Binocular Telescope (LBT).
- Gelino et al. examined for binarity nine brown dwarfs using Laser Guide Star Adaptive Optics system (LGS-AO) on Keck II telescope on Mauna Kea; seven of these nine brown dwarfs were also newfound, including WISE 1741+2553. These observations had indicated that two of these nine brown dwarfs are binary, but the other seven, including WISE 1741+2553, are single brown dwarfs.
- Kirkpatrick et al. presented discovery of 98 new found by WISE brown dwarf systems with components of spectral types M, L, T and Y, among which also was WISE 1741+2553. (Note: These 98 brown dwarf systems are only among first, not all brown dwarf systems, discovered from data, collected by WISE: six discoveries were published earlier (however, also listed in Kirkpatrick et al. (2011)) in Mainzer et al. (2011) and Burgasser et al. (2011), and the other discoveries were published later.)

== See also ==
Another object, discovered by Scholz et al. (2011):

- WISE 0254+0223 (T8)

The other eight objects, checked for binarity by Gelino et al. (2011) on Keck II:

- binarity found:
  - WISE 0458+6434 (T8.5 + T9.5, component A discovered before by Mainzer et al. (2011))
  - WISE 1841+7000 (T5 + T5, newfound)
- binarity not found:
  - WISE 0750+2725 (T8.5, newfound (Note: Presented in Gelino et al. (2011), but this is not mentioned in Kirkpatrick et al. (2011) and Kirkpatrick et al. (2012) — according to these two articles, the only discovery paper of WISE 0750+2725 is Kirkpatrick et al. (2011).))
  - WISE 1322-2340 (T8, newfound)
  - WISE 1614+1739 (T9, newfound)
  - WISE 1617+1807 (T8, discovered before by Burgasser et al. (2011))
  - WISE 1627+3255 (T6, newfound)
  - WISE 1653+4444 (T8, newfound)
- List of nearest stars
- WISE 1541-2250 — Y0.5 object (44 light-years)
- UGPS 0722−05 — similar T9 object (13 light-years)
