= 2MASS J11145133−2618235 =

Brown dwarf star in the constellation Hydra

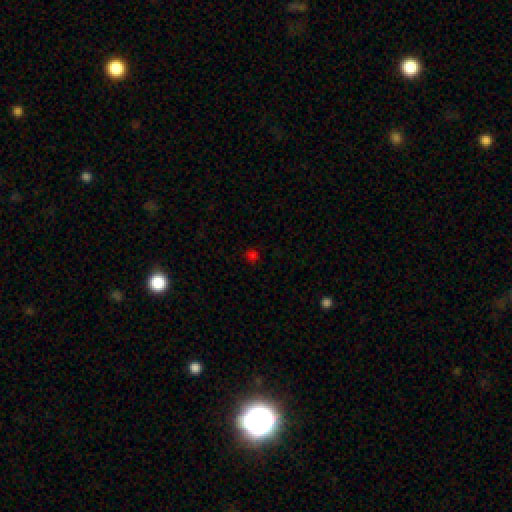
- 2MASS 1114-2618; Credit: legacy surveys

Observation data Epoch J2000 Equinox J2000
- Constellation: Hydra
- Right ascension: 11^{h} 14^{m} 51.337^{s}
- Declination: −26° 18′ 23.56″

Characteristics
- Spectral type: T7.5
- Apparent magnitude (i (GMOS filter system)): 23.21 ± 0.09
- Apparent magnitude (z (GMOS filter system)): 19.59 ± 0.04
- Apparent magnitude (J (2MASS filter system)): >15.86 ± 0.08
- Apparent magnitude (J (MKO filter system)): 15.52 ± 0.05
- Apparent magnitude (H (2MASS filter system)): >15.73 ± 0.12
- Apparent magnitude (H (MKO filter system)): 15.82 ± 0.05
- Apparent magnitude (K_{S} (2MASS filter system)): >16.1
- Apparent magnitude (K_{S} (MKO filter system)): 16.54 ± 0.05

Astrometry
Proper motion (μ)	RA: −3023.73 mas/yr Dec.: −380.18 mas/yr
Parallax (π)	185.61±1.81 mas
Distance	17.6 ± 0.2 ly (5.39 ± 0.05 pc)

Details
Mass	0.029–0.048 M_{☉}
Mass	30–50 M_{Jup}
Radius	1.01±0.11 R_{Jup}
Surface gravity (log g)	4.97+0.22 −0.40 cgs
Temperature	617+5 −3 K
Metallicity	−0.24+0.12 −0.17
Age	3–8 Gyr

Other designations
- 2MASS J11145133-2618235, 2MASS 1114-2618, 2M1114−26, 2M1114−2618, 2MASS 1114−26, 2MASS J1114−2618, WISE J111448.79−261827.7

Database references
SIMBAD	data
- Location of 2M1114−26 in the constellation Hydra

2MASS J11145133−2618235 (designation abbreviated to 2MASS 1114−2618), or 2M1114−26, or 2M1114−2618, or 2MASS 1114−26, or 2MASS J1114−2618) is a nearby brown dwarf of spectral class T7.5, located in constellation Hydra (Note: The nearest known star/brown dwarf in this constellation.) at approximately 18 light-years from Earth.

== Discovery ==
2MASS 1114−2618 was discovered in 2005 by C. G. Tinney et al. from the 2MASS Wide-Field T Dwarf Search (WFTS), based on observations obtained at the Anglo-Australian Telescope, Siding Spring, Australia. In 2005 Tinney et al. published a paper in The Astronomical Journal, where they presented discovery of five new brown dwarfs of spectral type T, among which also was 2MASS 1114−2618.

== Distance and proper motion ==
Trigonometric parallax of 2MASS 1114−2618, measured in 2026 by Vrba et al., is 0.1856 ± 0.0018 arcsec, corresponding to a distance 5.39 ± 0.05 pc, or 17.6 ± 0.2 ly.

The photometric distance estimate of 2MASS 1114−2618, published in its discovery paper in 2005, is 7 pc (22.8 ly). Spectrophotometric distance estimate by Kirkpatrick et al. (2012), is 6.6 pc (21.5 ly).

2MASS 1114−2618 has quite a large proper motion of 3047.54 mas/yr with position angle 262.83 degrees, indicating motion in south-west direction on the sky. At distance 17.6 ly (assuming parallax 185.6 ± 1.8 mas), the corresponding tangential velocity is 77.83 km/s.

== See also ==
The other four discoveries of brown dwarfs, presented in Tinney et al. (2005):

- 2MASS 0939−2448 (T8, binary brown dwarf)
