= HD 164427 =

Star in the constellation Pavo

Observation data Epoch J2000 Equinox ICRS
- Constellation: Pavo
- Right ascension: 18^{h} 04^{m} 42.59691^{s}
- Declination: −59° 12′ 34.4694″
- Apparent magnitude (V): 6.88

Characteristics
- Evolutionary stage: main sequence
- Spectral type: G0+V
- B−V color index: 0.624±0.015

Astrometry
Radial velocity (R_{v})	+3.59±0.36 km/s
Proper motion (μ)	RA: −199.683 mas/yr Dec.: −51.125 mas/yr
Parallax (π)	26.0380±0.2535 mas
Distance	125 ± 1 ly (38.4 ± 0.4 pc)
Absolute magnitude (M_{V})	3.98±0.06

Orbit
Period (P)	108.53855±0.00033 d
Semi-major axis (a)	0.513+0.015 −0.016 AU
Eccentricity (e)	0.54944±0.00073
Inclination (i)	9.340+0.066 −0.058°
Longitude of the node (Ω)	337.69+0.41 −0.49°
Periastron epoch (T)	2457368.358±0.017
Argument of periastron (ω) (secondary)	−3.187+0.078 −0.070°
Semi-amplitude (K_{1}) (primary)	2.2162+0.0028 −0.0031 km/s

Details
Mass	1.19±0.14 M_{☉}
Radius	1.404±0.037 R_{☉}
Luminosity	2.66+0.48 −0.34 L_{☉}
Surface gravity (log g)	4.216+0.062 −0.069 cgs
Temperature	6,220+310 −240 K
Metallicity [Fe/H]	−0.06+0.22 −0.25 dex
Age	6.6+1.3 −0.9 Gyr

HD 164427 B
Mass	0.339+0.002 −0.003 M_{☉}
Mass	355.5+2.6 −2.9 M_{Jup}

Other designations
- CD−59°6780, GJ 700, HD 164427, HIP 88531, SAO 245217

Database references
SIMBAD	data

HD 164427 is a star with a likely red dwarf companion in the southern constellation of Pavo. It has an apparent visual magnitude of 6.88, placing it just below the nominal limit for visibility with the typical naked eye. The annual parallax shift of 26.0 mas yields a distance estimate of 125 light-years (38 parsecs). It is moving further from the Earth with a heliocentric radial velocity of +3.4 km/s.

This is an inactive G-type main-sequence star given a stellar classification of G0+V by Gray et al. (2006), although Evans et al. (1964) classified it as a subgiant star with luminosity class IV. It is 6.6 billion years old with 1.125 times the mass of the Sun and 1.40 times the Sun's radius. The star is somewhat over-luminous for its class, radiating 2.33 times the Sun's luminosity from its photosphere at an effective temperature of 5,876 K.

== Companions ==
In 2001, a brown dwarf candidate companion was announced by Anglo-Australian Planet Search program. It was detected by the Doppler velocity technique with an echelle spectrograph attached to the 3.92m Anglo-Australian Telescope. A magnitude 12.60 companion star designated HD 164427 B lies at an angular separation of 28.90″ along a position angle of 336°, as of 2010. This is a suspected common proper motion companion with 52% of the Sun's mass and a physical separation of as much as 1,090 AU.

HD 164427 b was initially thought to be a brown dwarf based on its minimum mass of 46 times that of Jupiter. In 2023, an astrometric orbit for this object was published using data from Gaia, showing its true mass to be 0.34 M_{☉}, making it a likely red dwarf star. This stellar companion orbits at nearly half an astronomical unit or Earth-to-Sun distance away from its primary. The angular separation between the two stars as viewed from Earth is 11.76 milliarcseconds. It takes 108.55 Earth days to orbit eccentrically around HD 164427. It has a very high semi-amplitude of almost 1400 m/s, because this is a very massive object which exerts strong gravitational pull on its tugging star.
