= HD 140913 =

Star in the constellation Corona Borealis

Observation data Epoch J2000 Equinox ICRS
- Constellation: Corona Borealis
- Right ascension: 15^{h} 45^{m} 07.44910^{s}
- Declination: +28° 28′ 11.7388″
- Apparent magnitude (V): 8.07

Characteristics
- Evolutionary stage: main sequence
- Spectral type: G0V
- B−V color index: 0.612±0.007

Astrometry
Radial velocity (R_{v})	−20.38±0.21 km/s
Proper motion (μ)	RA: −87.880 mas/yr Dec.: 37.978 mas/yr
Parallax (π)	20.4949±0.0367 mas
Distance	159.1 ± 0.3 ly (48.79 ± 0.09 pc)
Absolute magnitude (M_{V})	4.81

Orbit
Period (P)	147.912+0.022 −0.023 d
Semi-major axis (a)	0.561+0.015 −0.016 AU
Eccentricity (e)	0.5223±0.0081
Inclination (i)	30.3±1.3°
Longitude of the node (Ω)	311.0±1.6°
Periastron epoch (T)	2,457,387.33±0.90 JD
Argument of periastron (ω) (secondary)	23.7+2.1 −1.8°
Semi-amplitude (K_{1}) (primary)	2.023±0.073 km/s

Details
Mass	0.987±0.087 M_{☉}
Radius	1.034±0.021 R_{☉}
Luminosity	1.32+0.15 −0.11 L_{☉}
Surface gravity (log g)	4.403+0.042 −0.050 cgs
Temperature	6,090+180 −140 K
Metallicity [Fe/H]	−0.26+0.21 −0.23 dex
Rotational velocity (v sin i)	9.7 km/s
Age	7.13 Gyr

HD 140913 b
Mass	93.3+1.7 −1.6 M_{Jup}

Other designations
- BD+28°2469, HD 140913, HIP 77152, SAO 83985

Database references
SIMBAD	data

HD 140913 is a Sun-like star located in the northern constellation of Corona Borealis (The Northern Crown). It is too faint to be visible to the naked eye with an apparent visual magnitude of 8.07. The star is located at a distance of 159 light-years from the Sun based on parallax. Prior to the discovery of a companion, this served as an IAU radial velocity standard, and it is receding from the Sun at a rate of +37 km/s. The space velocity components of this star are (U, V, W) = (-21.77, -14.42, 1.67).

== Physical characteristics ==
HD 140913 is a solar-type star with a spectral type of G0V. It is estimated to be seven billion years old and is spinning with a projected rotational velocity of 9.7 km/s. The star is about the same size as the Sun and 92% of its mass. It is radiating 1.3 times the Sun's luminosity from its photosphere at an effective temperature of 6,090 K.

== Companion ==
The detection of an orbiting companion, designated HD 140913 B, was announced in 1994. The minimum mass of this object is 43.2 times the mass of Jupiter, making it a brown dwarf candidate. Alternatively, it may be an under-mass helium white dwarf that has lost its envelope during a mass transfer. It orbits the host star about every 148 days with an eccentricity (ovalness) of ~0.57 and a semimajor axis of at least 0.55 AU.

In 2023, the true mass of this companion was determined using Gaia astrometry. Two different studies find masses ranging from about 75 to about 93 Jupiter masses, placing this object near the boundary between brown dwarfs and low-mass stars.
