= 47 Ophiuchi =

Star in the constellation Ophiuchus

- Location of 47 Ophiuchi (circled in red)

Observation data Epoch J2000 Equinox ICRS
- Constellation: Ophiuchus
- Right ascension: 17^{h} 26^{m} 37.88157^{s}
- Declination: −05° 05′ 11.7545″
- Apparent magnitude (V): 4.54 (4.93 / 5.83)

Characteristics
- Spectral type: F3V
- U−B color index: -0.03
- B−V color index: +0.39

Astrometry
Radial velocity (R_{v})	1.67±0.13 km/s
Proper motion (μ)	RA: −93.066 mas/yr Dec.: −43.198 mas/yr
Parallax (π)	30.9863±0.1581 mas
Distance	105.3 ± 0.5 ly (32.3 ± 0.2 pc)

Orbit
Period (P)	26.27565 ± 0.00004 d
Semi-major axis (a)	7.99±0.10 mas
Eccentricity (e)	0.481±0.002
Inclination (i)	59.5±1.3°
Longitude of the node (Ω)	121.8±1.0°
Periastron epoch (T)	JD 2448103.380±0.026
Argument of periastron (ω) (secondary)	27.04±0.54°
Semi-amplitude (K_{1}) (primary)	46.92±0.40 km/s
Semi-amplitude (K_{2}) (secondary)	52.80±0.39 km/s

Details

A
Mass	1.50±0.06 M_{☉}
Radius	2.06±0.07 R_{☉}
Luminosity	7.80±0.36 L_{☉}

B
Mass	1.34±0.06 M_{☉}
Radius	1.36±0.06 R_{☉}
Luminosity	3.41±0.25 L_{☉}

C
Mass	70±1 M_{Jup}
Radius	0.93±0.01 R_{Jup}
Surface gravity (log g)	5.32±0.01 cgs
Temperature	1,580±10 K

Other designations
- BD−04°4275, FK5 647, HD 157950, HIP 85365, HR 6493, SAO 141665

Database references
SIMBAD	data

47 Ophiuchi (47 Oph) is a binary star in the constellation Ophiuchus. The combined apparent magnitude of the system is 4.54. The system is located about 105.3 light-years (32.3 parsecs) away, based on its parallax as measured by Gaia.

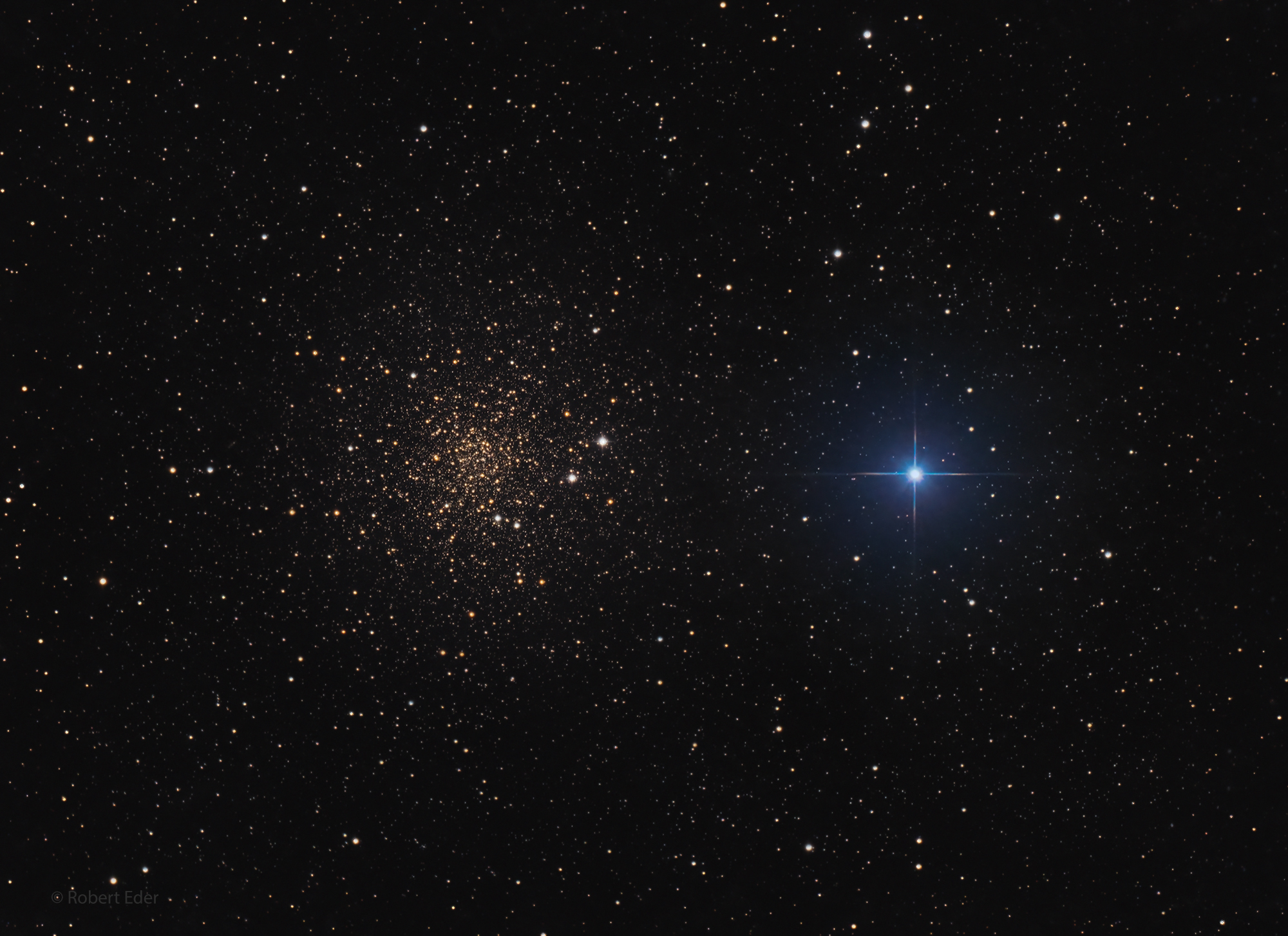
47 Ophiuchi (right) with the globular cluster NGC 6366

47 Ophiuchi is a spectroscopic binary: that is, the two stars move fast enough that periodic Doppler shifts in the stars' spectra can be detected. In this case, the two stars have also been resolved using interferometry. The primary star is an F-type main-sequence star, that is 1.5 times the mass of the Sun and around twice as wide. Its companion star is 1.34 times the mass of the Sun, and 1.36 times the radius of the Sun. The two stars orbit each other every 26.3 days, and its orbital eccentricity is 0.481.

The designation 47 Ophiuchi was originally used for the star HR 6496. However, when constellation borders were redrawn, that star fell into the constellation Serpens, and the designation became used for this star, HR 6493, instead.

There is also a wider companion, a brown dwarf which has a projected separation of 8850 astronomical units from 47 Ophiuchi. It is a L-type brown dwarf with a spectral type of L5.5. This object is 70 times more massive than Jupiter and is close to the hydrogen burning limit – the dividing line between brown dwarfs and stars – while its radius is only 0.93 times that of Jupiter.
