= WISE J0254+0223 =

Star in the constellation Cetus

WISEPA J025409.45+022359.1
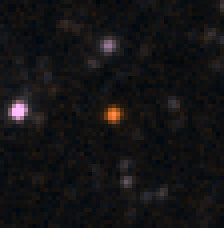
- WISE 0254+0223; Credit: unWISE

Observation data Epoch MJD 55588.27 Equinox J2000
- Constellation: Cetus
- Right ascension: 02^{h} 54^{m} 09.62^{s}
- Declination: 02° 23′ 58.85″

Characteristics
- Spectral type: T8
- Apparent magnitude (Y (MKO filter system)): 16.999±0.014
- Apparent magnitude (J (2MASS filter system)): 16.557±0.156
- Apparent magnitude (J (MKO filter system)): 15.916±0.008
- Apparent magnitude (H (2MASS filter system)): 15.884±0.199
- Apparent magnitude (H (MKO filter system)): 16.29±0.02
- Apparent magnitude (K_{S} (2MASS filter system)): >16.006
- Apparent magnitude (K (MKO filter system)): 16.73±0.05

Astrometry
Proper motion (μ)	RA: 2588±27 mas/yr Dec.: 273±27 mas/yr
Parallax (π)	146.1±1.5 mas
Distance	22.3 ± 0.2 ly (6.84 ± 0.07 pc)

Other designations
- WISEPC J025409.45+022359.1; WISEPA J025409.45+022359.1; WISE J0254+0223; PSO J043.5395+02.3995; PSO J043.5+02

Database references
SIMBAD	data

WISEPA J025409.45+022359.1 (designation is abbreviated to WISE 0254+0223) is a brown dwarf of spectral class T8, located in constellation Cetus at approximately 22.3 light-years from Earth. It was discovered by astronomers from the Leibniz Institute for Astrophysics Potsdam.

== History of observations ==
=== Discovery ===
WISE 0254+0223 was discovered in 2011 from data, collected by Wide-field Infrared Survey Explorer (WISE) Earth-orbiting satellite—NASA infrared-wavelength 40 cm (16 in) space telescope, which mission lasted from December 2009 to February 2011. WISE 0254+0223 has two discovery papers: Scholz et al. (2011) and Kirkpatrick et al. (2011) (the first was published earlier).

- Scholz et al. discovered two late T-type brown dwarfs, including WISE 0254+0223, using preliminary data release from WISE and follow-up near-infrared spectroscopy with LUCIFER1 near-infrared camera/spectrograph at the Large Binocular Telescope (LBT).
- Kirkpatrick et al. presented discovery of 98 new found by WISE brown dwarf systems with components of spectral types M, L, T and Y, among which also was WISE 0254+0223. (Note: These 98 brown dwarf systems are only among first, not all brown dwarf systems, discovered from data, collected by WISE: six discoveries were published earlier (however, also listed in Kirkpatrick et al. (2011)) in Mainzer et al. (2011) and Burgasser et al. (2011), and the other discoveries were published later.)

== Distance ==
Currently the most accurate distance estimate of WISE 0254+0223 is a trigonometric parallax, measured using the Spitzer Space Telescope and published in 2019 by Kirkpatrick et al.: 146.1±1.5 mas, corresponding to a distance 6.84±0.07 pc, or 22.3±0.2 ly.

WISE 0254+0223 distance estimates

Source	Parallax, mas	Distance, pc	Distance, ly	Ref.
Scholz et al. (2011) (preprint version 1)		5.5+1.4 −1.1	17.9+4.6 −3.6	
Scholz et al. (2011)		5.5+2.3 −1.6	17.9+7.5 −5.2	
Kirkpatrick et al. (2011), Table 6		~ 6.9	~ 22.5	
Kirkpatrick et al. (2011), Table 7	165±46	6.1+2.3 −1.3	19.8+7.6 −4.3	
Liu et al. (2011)		7.2±0.7	23.5±2.3	
Liu et al. (2011)	171±45	5.8+2.1 −1.2	19.1+7.8 −4.0	
Scholz et al. (2012)	165±20	6.1+0.8 −0.7	19.8+2.7 −2.1	
Marsh et al. (2013) (according to Kirkpatrick et al. (2012))	166±26	6.0+1.1 −0.8	19.6+3.6 −2.7	
Marsh et al. (2013)	185±42	4.9+1.0 −0.6 (Note: In this parallax and distance estimates the most probable distance value does not equal to inverse maximum likelihood parallax value, as would be in the case of exact parallax and distance values. This is because Marsh et al. used a more sophisticated method of converting maximum likelihood parallaxes into most probable distances, that uses also some prior information, and not just the calculation of the inverse value. (The method description see in Marsh et al. (2013), Section 4).)	16.0^{+3.3}_{−2.0}	
Dupuy & Kraus (2013)	**135 ± 15** (Note: Relative parallax.)	**7.4+0.9** **−0.7**	**24.2+3.0** **−2.4**	

Non-trigonometric distance estimates are marked in italic. The most accurate estimate is marked in bold.

== Space motion ==
WISE 0254+0223 has a large proper motion of about 2602 milliarcseconds per year.

WISE 0254+0223 proper motion estimates

Source	μ, mas/yr	P. A., °	μ_{RA}, mas/yr	μ_{DEC}, mas/yr	Ref.
Scholz et al. (2011)	2511	84	2496±46	276±47	
Kirkpatrick et al. (2011)	2546	85	2534±28	243±37	
Marsh et al. (2013)	2596	83	2578±42	309±50	
Dupuy & Kraus (2013)	**2602±27**	**84.0±0.6**	**2588±27**	**273±27**	

The most accurate estimates are marked in bold.

== See also ==
Another object, discovered by Scholz et al. (2011):

- WISE 1741+2553 (T9)
