= 81 Cancri =

Star in the constellation Cancer

Observation data Epoch J2000.0 Equinox ICRS
- Constellation: Cancer
- Right ascension: 09^{h} 12^{m} 17.547^{s}
- Declination: +14° 59′ 45.78″
- Apparent magnitude (V): 6.49

Characteristics
- Spectral type: G8V + K1V / L8 + ~L8
- B−V color index: 0.731±0.004
- Variable type: Constant

Astrometry
Radial velocity (R_{v})	49.8252±0.076 km/s
Proper motion (μ)	RA: −523.619 mas/yr Dec.: +244.282 mas/yr
Parallax (π)	49.1493±0.3467 mas
Distance	66.4 ± 0.5 ly (20.3 ± 0.1 pc)
Absolute magnitude (M_{V})	+4.95

Orbit
Primary	81 Cancri A
Name	81 Cancri B
Period (P)	988.058±0.34698 d
Semi-major axis (a)	115.4±0.63″
Eccentricity (e)	0.433256±0.0034
Inclination (i)	124.1±0.64°
Longitude of the node (Ω)	317.6±0.46°
Periastron epoch (T)	1982.690±0.0040
Argument of periastron (ω) (secondary)	170.731±0.81°
Argument of periastron (ω) (primary)	350.731±0.81°
Semi-amplitude (K_{1}) (primary)	11.4908±0.11 km/s
Semi-amplitude (K_{2}) (secondary)	12.1317±0.14 km/s

Details

81 Cnc A
Mass	0.89±0.029 M_{☉}
Radius	0.82 R_{☉}
Luminosity	1.03 L_{☉}
Surface gravity (log g)	4.55 cgs
Temperature	5,430 K
Metallicity [Fe/H]	−0.28 dex

81 Cnc B
Mass	0.85±0.026 M_{☉}
Radius	0.81 R_{☉}
Surface gravity (log g)	4.56 cgs
Temperature	5,360 K
Metallicity [Fe/H]	−0.28 dex

Other designations
- π^{1} Cnc, 81 Cancri, GJ 337, HD 79096, HIP 45170, SAO 98427, WDS J09123+1500

Database references
SIMBAD	data

81 Cancri is a stellar system in the zodiac constellation of Cancer. It has the Bayer designation Pi^{1} Cancri, which is Latinized from π^{1} Cancri, and abbreviated Pi^{1} Cnc or π^{1} Cnc; 81 Cancri is the star's Flamsteed designation. The main component of the system is a close binary, while a brown dwarf binary is located at a wide separation. The primary is just bright enough to be visible to the naked eye, having an apparent visual magnitude of 6.49. Its position near the ecliptic means it is subject to lunar occultations.

Based on parallax measurements, this system is located at a distance of 66 light-years (20 pc) from the Sun. HD 164595 has a large proper motion, traversing the celestial sphere at an angular rate of 0.578″ yr^{−1}. It is drifting further away with a line of sight velocity of 49.8 km/s.

== Components ==
81 Cancri was found to be a close visual binary by W. S. Finsen in 1959. Their orbit has a period of 2.7 yr with an eccentricity of 0.433. The primary is a G-type main-sequence star with a stellar classification of G8V. It has 89% of the mass of the Sun and 82% of the Sun's radius. This star is radiating a similar luminosity as the Sun from its photosphere with an effective temperature of 5,430 K. The secondary is a K-type main-sequence star with a class of K1V. It has a similar mass and temperature as the primary, being only ~0.04 M_{☉} lower in mass and a few hundred kelvin cooler.

A brown dwarf component in the system was detected in 2001. The source 2MASSW J0912145+145940 (2M0912+14) in the 2MASS catalogue was identified as having a common proper motion with the AB binary, and subsequent observations confirmed the brown dwarf nature of the companion. The new component, 81 Cancri C, was found to have a spectral type of L8, near to the L-T transition. Separated from the primary components by 43 arcseconds and at a distance of 20.4 parsecs, the brown dwarf has a minimum physical separation of approximately 880 AU.

The brown dwarf was found to be about half a magnitude brighter in the JHK bands than expected, compared to others of similar spectral type and known distance. The system was not found to not be particularly young to some confidence, so it was possible that component C could itself be a close binary not resolved by 2MASS. This was confirmed in 2006 as the source was found to be slightly oblong, caused by two components of similar spectral types. These two brown dwarfs, components C and D, have a separation of approximately 11 AU, and their mutual orbit likely takes on order of 150 years due to the small masses involved.

== See also ==
- 82 Cancri
