= 2MASS J15031961+2525196 =

T-type brown dwarf in the constellation Boötes

- Location of 2MASS 1503+2525 in the constellation Boötes

Observation data Epoch J2000 Equinox J2000
- Constellation: Boötes
- Right ascension: 15^{h} 03^{m} 19.613^{s}
- Declination: +25° 25′ 19.68″

Characteristics
- Spectral type: T5

Astrometry
Radial velocity (R_{v})	33±14 km/s
Proper motion (μ)	RA: 87.414±0.613 mas/yr Dec.: 557.780±0.695 mas/yr
Parallax (π)	155.7758±0.7557 mas
Distance	20.9 ± 0.1 ly (6.42 ± 0.03 pc)

Other designations
- 2MASS J15031961+2525196, Gaia DR2 1267906854386665088, SDSS J150319.64+252522.4

Database references
SIMBAD	data

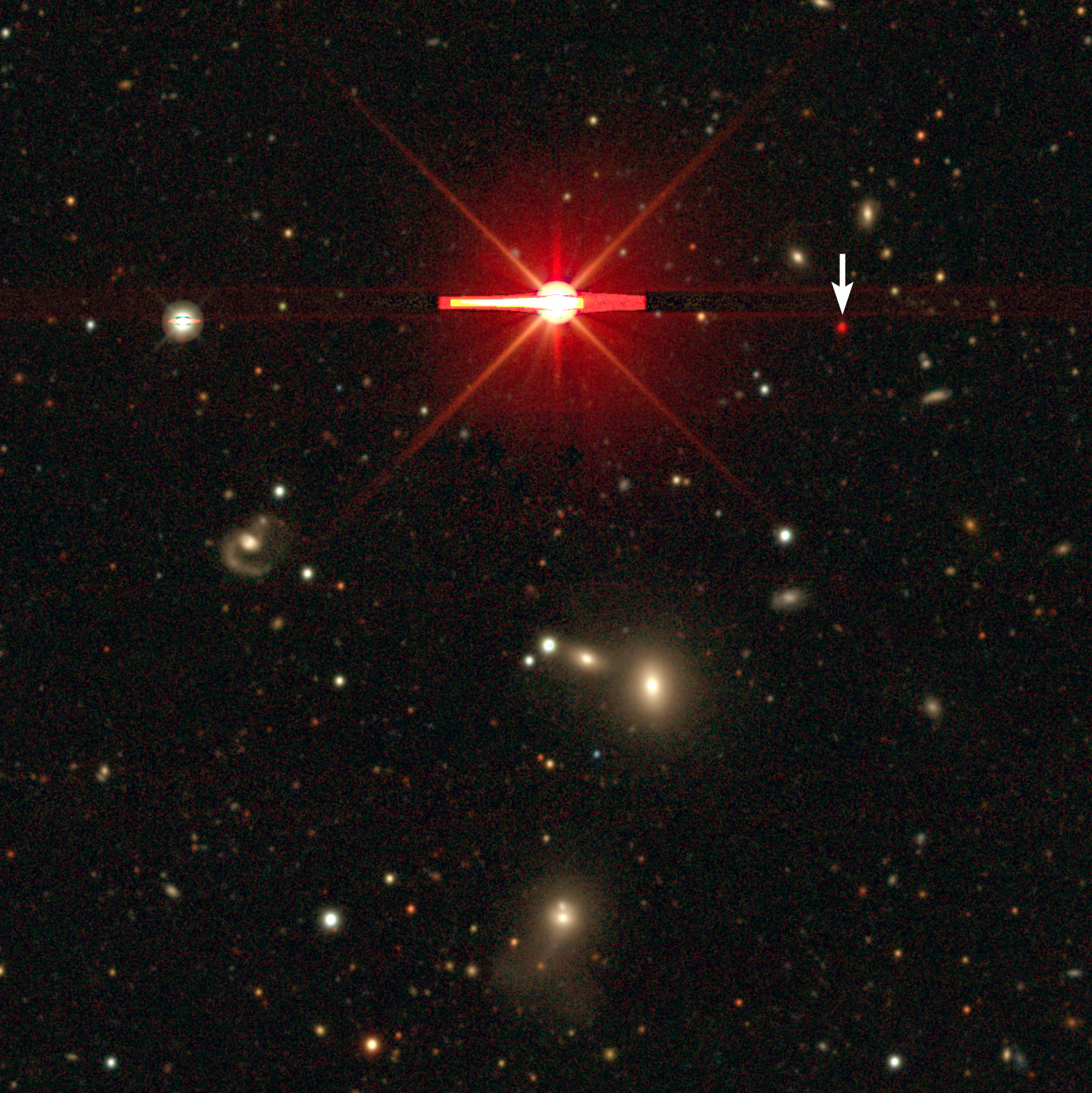
The brown dwarf 2MASS 1503+2525 is marked with a white arrow. The image also shows the star EX Boötis and a galaxy group. (Credit: legacy surveys)

2MASS J15031961+2525196 (2MASS 1503+2525) is a nearby brown dwarf of spectral type T5.5, located in the constellation of Boötes at approximately 20.7 light-years from Earth. It was discovered in 2003 by Adam J. Burgasser et al. in wide-field search for T dwarfs using the Two Micron All Sky Survey (2MASS).

Originally the most precise distance estimate of 2MASS 1503+2525 is a trigonometric parallax, published by Dupuy and Liu in 2012: 157.2 ± 2.2 mas, corresponding to a distance 6.36 ± 0.09 pc, or 20.7 ± 0.3 ly. The parallax was further refined by Gaia mission in 2018 to 154.9208±1.1025mas. The brown dwarf 2MASS 1503+2525 lies in a local void 6.5 parsecs across, where relatively few stars and brown dwarfs are located.

The 2MASS J15031961+2525196 is the spectral standard of the spectral class T5.
