= SDSS J143317.78+101123.3 =

Binary star system in the constellation of Boötes

SDSS J143317.78+101123.3.3
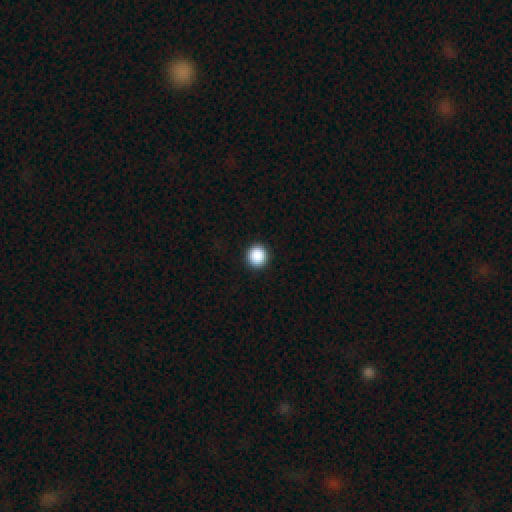
- SDSS J143317.78+101123.3; Credit: legacy surveys

Observation data Epoch J2000 Equinox
- Constellation: Boötes
- Right ascension: 14^{h} 33^{m} 17.7877^{s}
- Declination: +10° 11′ 23.485″
- Apparent magnitude (V): 18.86

Characteristics

J1433
- Evolutionary stage: White dwarf
- Spectral type: WD

J1433b
- Evolutionary stage: Brown dwarf
- Spectral type: L1±1

Astrometry
Proper motion (μ)	RA: −12.782 mas/yr Dec.: −53.117 mas/yr
Parallax (π)	4.2866±0.1566 mas
Distance	760 ± 30 ly (233 ± 9 pc)
Absolute bolometric magnitude (M_{bol})	25

Orbit
Period (P)	78.1 min
Semi-major axis (a)	0.5869 R_{☉}
Inclination (i)	84.36°
Semi-amplitude (K_{1}) (primary)	33.8 km/s
Semi-amplitude (K_{2}) (secondary)	511.1 km/s

Details

J1433
Surface gravity (log g)	8.41 cgs
Temperature	13,200±200 K

J1433b
Mass	0.055±0.008 M_{☉}
Mass	58±8 M_{Jup}
Temperature	2,401±10 K (day); 2,344±7 (night) K

Other designations
- J1433, PM J14332+1011, SDSS J143317.78+101122.8, Gaia EDR3 1176468611268115200, Gaia DR2 1176468611268115200
- J1433b: SDSS J143317.78+101122.8b

Database references
SIMBAD	data

SDSS J143317.78+101123.3 (shortened to SDSS J1433+1011, more simply J1433) is a binary system composed of a white dwarf and a brown dwarf. The brown dwarf is about 57 Jupiter masses and has transitioned from a stellar object to a brown dwarf due to losing mass to the white dwarf. As of 2016, this was the only known binary of this type.
