= HD 16760 =

Binary star system in the constellation Perseus

Observation data Epoch J2000.0 Equinox ICRS
- Constellation: Perseus
- Right ascension: 02^{h} 42^{m} 21.31345^{s}
- Declination: +38° 37′ 07.2319″
- Apparent magnitude (V): 8.76

Characteristics
- Evolutionary stage: main sequence
- Spectral type: G5V
- B−V color index: 0.715

Astrometry
Radial velocity (R_{v})	−3.95±0.38 km/s
Proper motion (μ)	RA: +73.809 mas/yr Dec.: −106.607 mas/yr
Parallax (π)	17.5714±0.5942 mas
Distance	186 ± 6 ly (57 ± 2 pc)
Absolute magnitude (M_{V})	5.41

Orbit
Name	HD 16760 b
Period (P)	466.048±0.057 d
Semi-major axis (a)	1.161±0.097 AU
Eccentricity (e)	0.0812±0.0018
Inclination (i)	2.6°±0.5° or 43.3+32.2 −28.8°
Periastron epoch (T)	24513802.6±1.9
Argument of periastron (ω) (secondary)	241.9±1.4°
Semi-amplitude (K_{1}) (primary)	407.16±0.71 km/s

Details

HD 16760 A
Mass	0.78 ± 0.05 M_{☉}
Radius	0.81 ± 0.27 R_{☉}
Luminosity (bolometric)	0.72 ± 0.43 L_{☉}
Surface gravity (log g)	4.47 ± 0.06 cgs
Temperature	5629 ± 44 K
Metallicity [Fe/H]	+0.067 ± 0.05 dex
Rotational velocity (v sin i)	0.5 ± 0.5 km/s
Age	1.3 ± 0.9 Gyr

HD 16760 b
Mass	0.267±0.014 (Note: Two discrepant masses from different sources are listed.) M_{☉}
Mass	21.5+5.0 −4.5 M_{Jup}

HD 16760 B
Mass	0.756 M_{☉}

Other designations
- BD+37°604, HD 16760, WDS J02424+3837
- A: HIP 12638, SAO 55798, TYC 2845-2243-1, GSC 02845-02243, 2MASS J02422130+3837073
- B: HIP 12635, TYC 2845-2242-1, GSC 02845-02242, 2MASS J02422094+3837212

Database references
SIMBAD	A
- Ab
- B

HD 16760 is a binary star system approximately 186 light-years away in the constellation Perseus. The primary star HD 16760A (HIP 12638) is a G-type main sequence star similar to the Sun. The secondary, HD 16760B (HIP 12635) is 1.521 magnitudes fainter and located at a separation of 14.6 arcseconds from the primary, corresponding to a physical separation of at least 660 AU.

The primary star also has a companion, either a red dwarf or a brown dwarf, that is designated HD 16760 b (lowercase). SIMBAD also lists the designation HD 16760C for this object.

== Companion (HD 16760 b) ==
HD 16760A
Period = 466 d
HD 16760b
14.6″ separation
HD 16760B

Hierarchy of orbits in the HD 16760 system

The companion object was discovered independently by the SOPHIE extrasolar planets program and the N2K Consortium. It has a minimum mass slightly exceeding the lower limit required for fusion of deuterium in its interior. This criterion is sometimes used to distinguish between brown dwarfs, which lie above the limit, and planets which lie below the limit. However its orbit is nearly circular, indicating that it may have formed in the same way as planets do, from a circumstellar disc. The formation of massive planets up to 20–25 Jupiter masses has been predicted in some models of the core accretion process. The identity of this object as a brown dwarf or a massive planet was thus unclear.

However, data analysed from direct imaging of the companion object using ground-based telescopes fitted with adaptive optics has revealed that it is aligned in a much more face-on orbit than previously realised. Consequently, its mass has been revised upwards. With a mass calculated at around one quarter that of the Sun, or nearly 300 Jupiter masses, it easily qualifies as a stellar object, probably a red dwarf. A 2020 study using Gaia astrometry supported a stellar true mass, but a 2026 study instead found a mass consistent with a brown dwarf. These two studies do not incorporate data from direct imaging.

The same 2026 study found evidence for a second companion from radial velocity. This candidate object would have a 234-day period and a minimum mass of 0.4 Jupiter masses, making it a probable planet.
