= Gliese 758 =

Star in the constellation Lyra

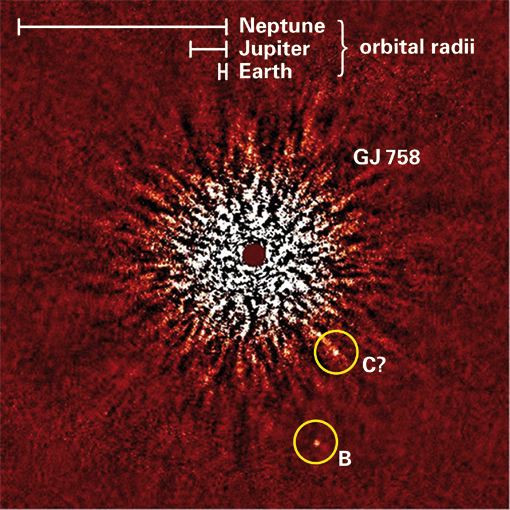
- Discovery image of Gliese 758 B, taken with Subaru HiCIAO in the near infrared

Observation data Epoch J2000.0 Equinox ICRS
- Constellation: Lyra
- Right ascension: 19^{h} 23^{m} 34.01317^{s}
- Declination: +33° 13′ 19.0784″
- Apparent magnitude (V): 6.36

Characteristics
- Spectral type: G8V+T7
- U−B color index: +0.455
- B−V color index: +0.799

Astrometry
Radial velocity (R_{v})	−21.62±0.12 km/s
Proper motion (μ)	RA: 81.966±0.013 mas/yr Dec.: 160.158±0.016 mas/yr
Parallax (π)	64.0703±0.0154 mas
Distance	50.91 ± 0.01 ly (15.608 ± 0.004 pc)
Absolute magnitude (M_{V})	5.37

Orbit
Primary	Gliese 758 A
Secondary	Gliese 758 B
Period (P)	131+15 −12 yr
Semi-major axis (a)	25.4+1.9 −1.6 AU
Eccentricity (e)	0.365+0.079 −0.082
Inclination (i)	48+6 −9°
Longitude of the node (Ω)	350±6°
Periastron epoch (T)	2,421,289.845+3,708.120 −4,680.545
Argument of periastron (ω) (secondary)	175+12 −15°
Semi-amplitude (K_{1}) (primary)	0.139+0.010 −0.008 km/s

Details

Gliese 758 A
Mass	0.98±0.05 M_{☉}
Radius	0.88 R_{☉}
Surface gravity (log g)	4.55 cgs
Temperature	5305 K
Metallicity [Fe/H]	0.18 dex
Age	7.7–8.7 Gyr

Gliese 758 B
Mass	36.8±0.5 M_{Jup}
Radius	0.89+0.03 −0.02 R_{Jup}
Luminosity	8.3×10^{−7} L_{☉}
Surface gravity (log g)	5.01+0.04 −0.01 cgs
Temperature	578+5 −0 K
Metallicity [Fe/H]	$\begin{smallmatrix}\left[\ce{M}/\ce{H}\right]\end{smallmatrix}$ = 0.19+0.03 −0.04 dex

Other designations
- GJ 758, BD+32 3411, HD 182488, HIP 95319, HR 7368, PPM 82821, SAO 68239

Database references
SIMBAD	A
- B

Gliese 758 is a star in the northern constellation of Lyra. At about magnitude 6 it is a challenge to view with the naked eye even in good seeing conditions, but can be easily seen through a small telescope or binoculars. Parallax measurements from the Hipparcos mission give it an estimated distance of around 50.9 light-years (15.6 parsecs) from Earth.

== Properties ==
This is a Sun-like star with 97% of the Sun's mass and 88% of the radius of the Sun. The spectrum matches a stellar classification of G8V, identifying it as a G-type main-sequence star that is generating energy through the nuclear fusion of hydrogen at its core. It is radiating this energy into space from its outer envelope at an effective temperature of 5,425 K. Estimates of its age put it at about 7.7–8.7 billion years old, although some measurements give it an age as low as 720 million years. The abundance of elements other than hydrogen and helium, what astronomers term the star's metallicity, are 51% higher than in the Sun.

== Companion ==
In November 2009, a team using the HiCIAO instrument of the Subaru Telescope imaged a substellar companion orbiting the star. This brown dwarf, designated Gliese 758 B, was estimated to be of approximately 10 to 40 Jupiter masses. A second candidate object was also detected, which was given the designation Gliese 758 C. Follow-up studies of the system refined the mass range of Gliese 758 B, indicating it to be a companion with approximately 30 to 40 Jupiter masses, and revealed that Gliese 758 C is a background star which is not physically associated with the Gliese 758 system. On the other hand, a younger age was suggested from the kinematic stellar grouping.

The most recent parameters for Gliese 758 B as of 2022 come from a combination of data from radial velocity, astrometry, and imaging, showing that it is about 36 times the mass of Jupiter, and on an eccentric orbit with a semi-major axis of about 25.4 astronomical units and an orbital period of about 131 years.

First near-infrared spectroscopy was published in 2017. This team used the Hale Telescope at Palomar Observatory to obtain a low-resolution spectrum. Comparison with archived IRTF/SpeX spectra of brown dwarfs resulted in a best fit to a spectral type of T7.0 ±1.0. The modelling of the spectrum indicates a temperature of 741 ± 25 K, which is slightly hotter than previously thought. A later spectral type and lower temperature is not excluded.

== See also ==
- Direct imaging of extrasolar planets
- Lists of exoplanets
