= BW Sculptoris =

Dwarf nova in the constellation Sculptor

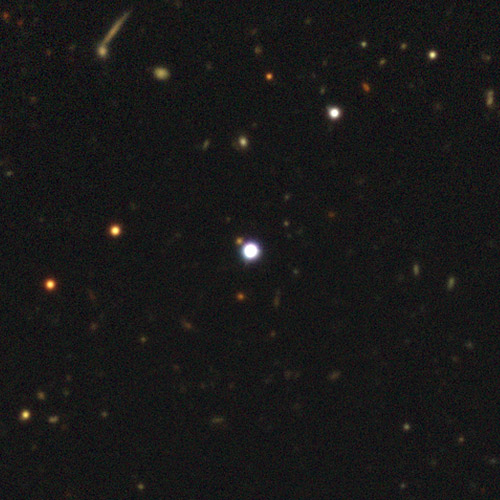
- BW Sculptoris is the blue-white star in the center Credit: Legacy Surveys/D. Lang (Perimeter Institute)

Observation data Epoch J2000 Equinox J2000
- Constellation: Sculptor
- Right ascension: 23^{h} 53^{m} 00.8742^{s}
- Declination: −38° 51′ 46.662″
- Apparent magnitude (V): 16.2- - 16.54

Characteristics
- Evolutionary stage: white dwarf + brown dwarf
- Spectral type: D + T
- Variable type: cataclysmic variable

Astrometry
Proper motion (μ)	RA: 81.036±0.043 mas/yr Dec.: −63.109±0.050 mas/yr
Parallax (π)	10.6786±0.0524 mas
Distance	305 ± 1 ly (93.6 ± 0.5 pc)

Orbit
Primary	BW Scl A
Name	BW Scl B
Period (P)	78.23 minutes
Semi-major axis (a)	0.58±0.02 R_{☉}
Inclination (i)	64.3±3.6°
Semi-amplitude (K_{1}) (primary)	27.7±3.0 km/s
Semi-amplitude (K_{2}) (secondary)	461±13 km/s

Details

A
Mass	0.85±0.04 or 1.007+0.010 −0.012 M_{☉}
Radius	0.00800+0.00014 −0.00011 R_{☉}
Surface gravity (log g)	8.635+0.017 −0.020 cgs
Temperature	15,145+51 −57 K

B
Mass	53.4±6.3 M_{Jup}
Radius	1.03±0.05 R_{Jup}

Other designations
- RX J2353.0-3852, HE 2350-3908, 2MASS J23530086-3851465, MCT 2350-3908, TIC 183676876, AAVSO 2347-39

Database references
SIMBAD	data

BW Sculptoris is WZ Sge-type dwarf nova and a candidate period bouncer. The binary consists of a white dwarf and a brown dwarf donor that orbits the white dwarf every 78.23 minutes. BW Sculptoris is one of the closest and brightest cataclysmic variable stars with a brightness of about magnitude 16.5 and a distance of 93.3 parsecs. It also has the shortest period for any CVs known to date (as of August 2023).

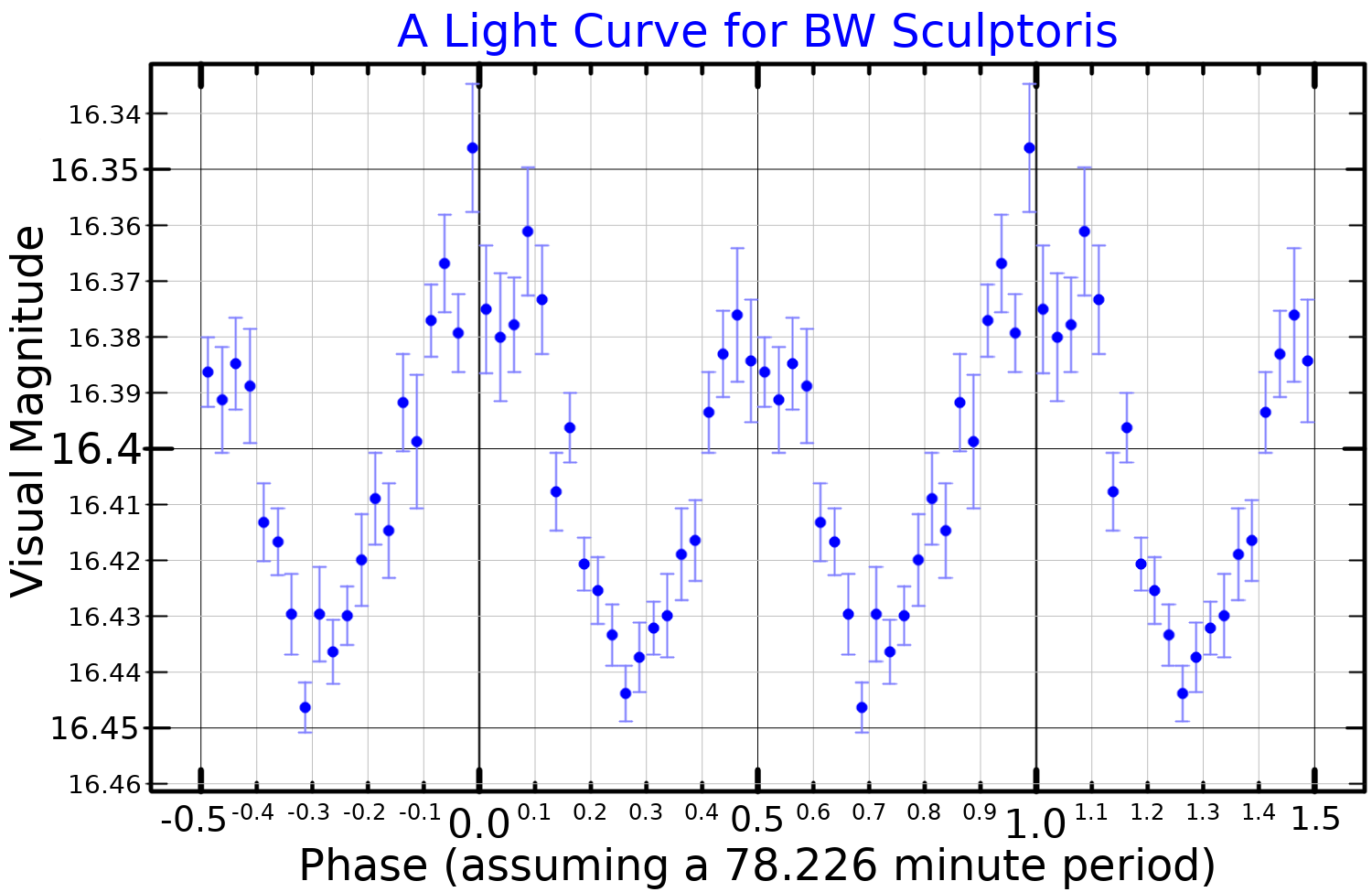
A visual band light curve for BW Sculptoris, adapted from Augusteijn and Wisotzki (1997)

BW Sculptoris was discovered in 1997 by two teams. Abbott et al. discovered it with ROSAT as RX J2353.0-3852. Augusteijn & Wisotzki discovered it independently in the Hamburg/ESO survey with the ESO 1.52 meter telescope and it was originally designated HE 2350–3908 (it received its variable star designation, BW Sculptoris, in the year 2000). Both authors noted the low mass transfer. Earlier mass ratios hinted at a low mass donor and Neustroev & Mäntynen were able to narrow down the mass of the white dwarf to 0.85±0.04 M_{☉} and the mass of the donor to 0.051±0.006 M_{☉} (53.4±6.3 M_{J}), making the donor a brown dwarf. BW Sculptoris is a candidate period bouncer. This is an evolutionary stage of a cataclysmic variable in which a donor star loses enough mass to evolve into a substellar object or brown dwarf. This occurs together with a decrease of the orbital period until the period reaches 70–80 minutes, at which point the period increases again. It is suspected that BW Sculptoris already passed this minimum and that the orbital period will increase in the future.

== Superoutburst of 2011 ==
BW Sculptoris experienced a superoutburst with an amplitude of 7.5 mag in October 2011. The superoutburst was first detected by M. Linnolt (AAVSO) on October 21 with a visual magnitude of 9.6. On October 31 an ordinary superhump developed and on November 12 BW Sculptoris entered the rapid fading phase. Even 10 years after the superoutburst the star has not returned to its pre-outburst level.
