= HD 162020 =

Star in the constellation Scorpius

Observation data Epoch J2000 Equinox ICRS
- Constellation: Scorpius
- Right ascension: 17^{h} 50^{m} 38.35575^{s}
- Declination: −40° 19′ 06.0723″
- Apparent magnitude (V): 9.10

Characteristics
- Spectral type: K3V
- B−V color index: 0.964±0.066

Astrometry
| Radial velocity (R_{v}) | −26.55±2.30 km/s |
| Proper motion (μ) | RA: +19.412 mas/yr Dec.: −25.799 mas/yr |
| Parallax (π) | 31.8624±0.0622 mas |
| Distance | 102.4 ± 0.2 ly (31.38 ± 0.06 pc) |
| Absolute magnitude (M_{V}) | 6.76 |

Orbit
| Period (P) | 8.4282388+0.0000014 −0.0000026 d |
| Semi-major axis (a) | 0.0859±0.0010 AU |
| Eccentricity (e) | 0.28126±0.00057 |
| Inclination (i) | 177.273+0.030 −0.027° |
| Longitude of the node (Ω) | 288.93+0.67 −0.73° |
| Periastron epoch (T) | 2457393.1874+0.0026 −0.0023 |
| Argument of periastron (ω) (secondary) | 28.70+0.13 −0.12° |
| Semi-amplitude (K_{1}) (primary) | 1.8112+0.0013 −0.0016 km/s |

Details
| Mass | 0.797±0.042 M_{☉} |
| Radius | 0.770±0.017 R_{☉} |
| Luminosity | 0.413+0.056 −0.050 L_{☉} |
| Surface gravity (log g) | 4.567±0.028 cgs |
| Temperature | 5,270+190 −180 K |
| Metallicity [Fe/H] | −0.18+0.17 −0.19 dex |
| Rotational velocity (v sin i) | 1.9 km/s |
| Age | 5.7±4.7 Gyr; 3.1±2.7 Gyr |

HD 162020 b
| Mass | 0.39±0.02 M_{☉} |
| Mass | 410.8+5.8 −5.3 M_{Jup} |

Other designations
- CD−40°11894, HD 162020, HIP 87330, PPM 763039

Database references
| SIMBAD | data |
| Exoplanet Archive | data |

HD 162020 is a star in the southern constellation of Scorpius with a likely red dwarf companion. It has an apparent visual magnitude of 9.10, which is too faint to be visible to the naked eye. The distance to this system is 102 light-years (31 parsecs) based on stellar parallax. It is drifting closer to the Sun with a radial velocity of −27 km/s, and is predicted to come to within ~18 light-years in 1.1 million years.

This is an ordinary K-type main-sequence star with a stellar classification of K3V. The age estimate is poorly constrained but it appears to have an intermediate age of several billion years. However, the activity level suggests a younger star; the rotation rate of the star may have been increased through synchronization with the companion, resulting in a higher than normal activity for its age. X-ray emission has been detected from this star.

HD 162020 has 74% of the mass of the Sun and 73% of the Sun's radius. The abundance of iron is roughly the same as the Sun, suggesting a similar metallicity. It is radiating just 25.8% of the luminosity of the Sun from its photosphere at an effective temperature of 4,801 K. The star is spinning with a projected rotational velocity of 1.9 km/s.

== Companion ==
HD 162020 b is a companion, initially thought to be a brown dwarf, with a minimum mass of 15.0 M_{J}. At the time of discovery, the actual mass was undetermined since the orbital inclination was not known. This object orbits very close to the star at a distance of 0.075 AU with an eccentricity (ovalness) of 0.277. The object's distance from the star ranges from 0.054 to 0.096 AU. It has an extremely high semi-amplitude of 1,813 m/s. The discovery was announced on April 15, 2000 by the Geneva Extrasolar Planet Search Team.

Despite the presence of this massive object in an eccentric orbit around the star, computer modelling done in 2017 (when the object was still thought to be a brown dwarf) showed it is still theoretically possible for an Earth-mass exoplanet to be occupying a dynamically-stable orbit in the habitable zone of this star.

An astrometric measurement of this object's true mass was published in 2022 as part of Gaia DR3, revealing it to be 0.39 M_{☉} and thus likely a red dwarf star. A full orbital solution was published in 2023.
