= CoRoT-20c =

Exoplanet

Discovery
- Discovered by: HARPS
- Detection method: Radial velocity

Orbital characteristics
- Semi-major axis: 2.9 AU (430,000,000 km)
- Eccentricity: 0.6
- Orbital period (sidereal): 1675 d
- Star: CoRoT-20

Physical characteristics
- Mass: above 17 M_{J}

CoRoT-20c is a brown dwarf-massed substellar companion found by the HARPS radial-velocity search terrestrial telescope. It orbits CoRoT-20, a G2V star in the constellation of Monoceros. It has an effective temperature of 5,880 K (5,610 °C; 10,120 °F), a mass of 1.14 M_{☉}, a radius of 0.92 R_{☉}, and an above-solar metallicity. This is a young planet, with an estimated age between 0.06 and 0.14 Gyr.

== See also ==
- CoRoT-20b
