= CoRoT-20 =

Star in Monoceros

Observation data Epoch J2000.0 Equinox ICRS
- Constellation: Monoceros
- Right ascension: 06^{h} 30^{m} 52.902^{s}
- Declination: +00° 13′ 36.86″
- Apparent magnitude (V): 14.66

Characteristics
- Evolutionary stage: main sequence
- Spectral type: G2V
- Variable type: planetary transit

Astrometry
Radial velocity (R_{v})	+69.47±9.37 km/s
Proper motion (μ)	RA: −0.263 mas/yr Dec.: −2.797 mas/yr
Parallax (π)	1.1216±0.0220 mas
Distance	2,910 ± 60 ly (890 ± 20 pc)

Details
Mass	1.11 M_{☉}
Radius	1.02 R_{☉}
Luminosity	1.75 L_{☉}
Surface gravity (log g)	4.20 cgs
Temperature	5,880 K
Metallicity [Fe/H]	0.14 dex
Age	100 Myr

Other designations
- 2MASS J06305289+0013369, CMC14 J063052.9+001336, UCAC2 31822344, UCAC3 181-42077, USNO-B1.0 0902-00091920, USNO-A2.0 0900-03054387, CoRoT-Exo 20

Database references
SIMBAD	data

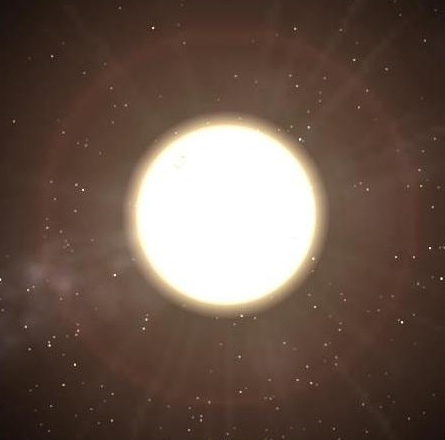

CoRoT-20 is a star, which is located in the constellation Monoceros at a distance of about 4011 light years from the Earth. The star is orbited by at least two planets.

== Characteristics ==
CoRoT-20 is a very young star of 14.66 magnitude by astronomical standards. Its age is estimated at 100 million years. In terms of mass and radius, it is almost identical to the Sun. Its surface temperature is about 5880 kelvins. CoRoT-20 got its name thanks to the space telescope CoRoT, which discovered its two planets.

== Planetary system ==
In 2011, a group of astronomers working within the CoRoT program announced the discovery of the planet CoRoT-20b and CoRoT-20c in this system. It is a hot gas giant, more than four times the mass of Jupiter. However, the planet's radius is only 84% of Jupiter's, which indicates an average high density. CoRoT-20b and c both orbit close to its parent star - at a distance of 0.09 AU The discovery of the planet was made by transit method.

The CoRoT-20 planetary system
Companion (in order from star)	Mass	Semimajor axis (AU)	Orbital period (days)	Eccentricity	Inclination (°)	Radius
b	4.3 M_{J}	0.09	—	0.59	—	—
c	17 M_{J}	2.9	—	0.6	—	—
