= G 196-3 =

Star in the constellation Ursa Major

Observation data Epoch J2000 Equinox ICRS
- Constellation: Ursa Major
- Right ascension: 10^{h} 04^{m} 21.4627^{s}
- Declination: +50° 23′ 13.386″
- Apparent magnitude (V): 11.7

Characteristics
- Evolutionary stage: main sequence
- Spectral type: M3.0V
- U−B color index: +1.67
- B−V color index: +1.16

Astrometry
Radial velocity (R_{v})	11.7 km/s
Proper motion (μ)	RA: −141.079 mas/yr Dec.: −202.336 mas/yr
Parallax (π)	45.8541±0.0188 mas
Distance	71.13 ± 0.03 ly (21.808 ± 0.009 pc)

Details
Mass	0.525 M_{☉}
Radius	0.52 R_{☉}
Luminosity	0.00431 L_{☉}
Surface gravity (log g)	5.0 cgs
Temperature	3,485 K
Rotation	1.315 days
Rotational velocity (v sin i)	16.6 km/s
Age	38 Myr

Other designations
- TYC 3440-13-1, NLTT 23293

Database references
SIMBAD	data

G 196-3 is a young low-mass M dwarf type star which is about 100 million years old. The star is located within the constellation Ursa Major about 71.1 light years away from the Earth. During observations by Instituto de Astrofísica de Canarias in Tenerife, Spain in 1998, a substellar-mass object was discovered to orbit approximately 300 astronomical units (AU) from the star. It was detected using direct imaging.

== Substellar companion ==
Observations of the substellar object were performed on January 25, 1998 where a faint red companion was present 16.2 arc seconds southwest of the star. A comparison of images taken at different wavelengths was done using low-intermediate-resolution spectroscopy confirmed the presence of a substellar object which was named G 196-3B. The Further observations confirmed the discovery when the team of Rafael Rebolo obtained R & I broadband photometry on March 19, 1998. The TCS Telescope showed its very cool nature in near-infrared (K Band). The comparison of the optical and infrared magnitudes including dust condensation has allowed astronomers to conclude that the substellar object was 25–10+15 Jupiter masses or simply 25 masses that of the Jovian-planet Jupiter. This was the second discovery of a brown dwarf that was found around a low-mass star whose age was relatively young. The separation of the star and the substellar object has suggested that both were parts of a fragment from a collapsing cloud although another possible scenario suggests that it originated from a dissipated protoplanetary disk.

The G 196-3 planetary system
Companion (in order from star)	Mass	Semimajor axis (AU)	Orbital period (days)	Eccentricity	Inclination (°)	Radius
B	26±1 M_{J}	350±1	—	—	—	1.36±0.23 R_{J}

== See also ==
- HAT-P-12
- HAT-P-13
- OGLE-TR-111
