= Rho2 Cancri =

Star in the constellation Cancer

Rho^{2} Cancri
Observation data Epoch J2000.0 Equinox J2000.0 (ICRS)
- Constellation: Cancer
- Right ascension: 08^{h} 55^{m} 39.680^{s}
- Declination: +27° 55′ 38.94″
- Apparent magnitude (V): 5.22

Characteristics
- Evolutionary stage: horizontal branch
- Spectral type: G8 III or G8 II-III
- U−B color index: +0.78
- B−V color index: +1.00

Astrometry
Radial velocity (R_{v})	+16.3±0.3 km/s
Proper motion (μ)	RA: −13.014 mas/yr Dec.: −32.535 mas/yr
Parallax (π)	5.5719±0.0903 mas
Distance	585 ± 9 ly (179 ± 3 pc)
Absolute magnitude (M_{V})	−1.13

Details
Mass	3.59 M_{☉}
Radius	24.2 R_{☉}
Luminosity	310 L_{☉}
Surface gravity (log g)	2.46 cgs
Temperature	4,994 K
Metallicity [Fe/H]	0.11 dex
Rotational velocity (v sin i)	8.1 km/s
Age	234 Myr

Other designations
- ρ^{2} Cnc, 58 Cancri, BD+28°1666, FK5 2705, GC 12326, HD 76219, HIP 43834, HR 3540, SAO 80511

Database references
SIMBAD	data

Rho^{2} Cancri is a solitary, yellow-hued star in the constellation Cancer. Its name is a Bayer designation that is Latinized from ρ^{2} Cancri, and abbreviated or Rho^{2} Cnc or ρ^{2} Cnc. With an apparent visual magnitude of 5.22, it is visible to the naked eye on a dark night. Based upon an annual parallax shift of 6.70 mas as seen from Earth, this star is located approximately 585 light-years (179 pc) from the Sun. At that distance, the visual magnitude is diminished by an extinction factor of 0.06 due to interstellar dust. It is moving further away with a line of sight velocity of +16 km/s.

At the age of about 234 million years, is an evolved, G-type giant star with a stellar classification of G8 III. It has an estimated 3.6 times the mass of the Sun and has expanded to 24 times the Sun's radius. It is radiating 310 times the Sun's luminosity from its photosphere at an effective temperature of 4,994 K. The star is spinning with a projected rotational velocity of 8 km/s.
