= WISEPA J031325.96+780744.2 =

Planetary-mass object in the constellation Cepheus

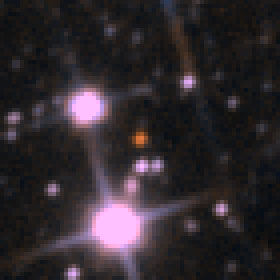
- WISE 0313+7807; Credit: unWISE

Observation data Epoch MJD 55448.07 Equinox J2000
- Constellation: Cepheus
- Right ascension: 03^{h} 13^{m} 26.02^{s}
- Declination: 78° 07′ 44.4″

Characteristics
- Spectral type: T8.5
- Apparent magnitude (J (2MASS filter system)): 17.65 ± 0.07
- Apparent magnitude (H (2MASS filter system)): 17.63 ± 0.06

Astrometry
Proper motion (μ)	RA: 71.1 ± 1.2 mas/yr Dec.: 54.8 ± 1.2 mas/yr
Parallax (π)	134.3±3.6 mas
Distance	24.3 ± 0.7 ly (7.4 ± 0.2 pc)

Details
Mass	32+6 −7 M_{Jup}
Radius	0.88±0.02 R_{Jup}
Surface gravity (log g)	5.01+0.09 −0.08 cgs
Temperature	591+6 −7 K
Metallicity	$\begin{smallmatrix}\left[\ce{M}/\ce{H}\right]\end{smallmatrix}$ = 0.16+0.04 −0.03
Age	6 Gyr

Other designations
- WISEPA J031325.96+780744.2; WISE J0313+7807; WISE 0313+7807

Database references
SIMBAD	data

WISEPA J031325.96+780744.2 (designation abbreviated to WISE 0313+7807, or WISE J0313+7807) is a brown dwarf of spectral class T8.5, located in constellation Cepheus at approximately 21 light-years from Earth.

== Discovery ==
WISE 0313+7807 was discovered in 2011 by J. Davy Kirkpatrick et al. from data, collected by Wide-field Infrared Survey Explorer (WISE) Earth-orbiting satellite—NASA infrared-wavelength 40 cm (16 in) space telescope, which mission lasted from December 2009 to February 2011. In 2011 Kirkpatrick et al. published a paper in The Astrophysical Journal Supplement, where they presented discovery of 98 new found by WISE brown dwarf systems with components of spectral types M, L, T and Y, among which also was WISE 0313+7807. (Note: This 98 brown dwarf systems are only among first, not all brown dwarf systems, discovered from data, collected by WISE: six discoveries was published earlier (however, also listed in Kirkpatrick et al. (2011)) in Mainzer et al. (2011) and Burgasser et al. (2011), and the other discoveries was published later.)

== Distance ==
Currently the most accurate distance estimate of WISEPA J031325.96+780744.2 is a trigonometric parallax, published in 2019 by Kirkpatrick et al.: 134.3 ± 3.6 mas, corresponding to 7.4+0.2
−0.2 pc, or 24.3+0.7
−0.6 ly.

WISE 0647-6232 distance estimates
Source	Parallax, mas	Distance, pc	Distance, ly	Ref.
Beichman et al. (2014)	153 ± 15	6.5^{+0.7}_{−0.6}	21.3^{+2.3}_{−1.9}	
Kirkpatrick et al. (2019)	**134.3 ± 3.6**	**7.4^{+0.2}_{−0.2}**	**24.3^{+0.7}_{−0.6}**	

The best estimate is marked in bold.
