= HN Pegasi =

Star in the constellation Pegasus

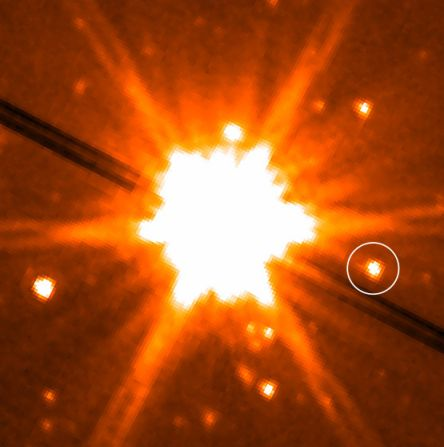
- HN Peg B (circled)

Observation data Epoch J2000.0 Equinox ICRS
- Constellation: Pegasus
- Right ascension: 21^{h} 44^{m} 31.330^{s}
- Declination: +14° 46′ 18.98″
- Apparent magnitude (V): 5.92–5.95

Characteristics
- Evolutionary stage: main sequence
- Spectral type: G0 V CH–0.5
- U−B color index: +0.031
- B−V color index: +0.588
- Variable type: BY Dra

Astrometry
Radial velocity (R_{v})	−16.68±0.09 km/s
Proper motion (μ)	RA: +231.108 mas/yr Dec.: −113.200 mas/yr
Parallax (π)	55.148±0.0348 mas
Distance	59.14 ± 0.04 ly (18.13 ± 0.01 pc)
Absolute magnitude (M_{V})	4.70

Details

HN Peg A
Mass	1.085±0.091 M_{☉}
Radius	1.002±0.018 R_{☉}
Luminosity (bolometric)	1.090 L_{☉}
Surface gravity (log g)	4.45 cgs
Temperature	5,961 K
Metallicity [Fe/H]	−0.06 dex
Rotation	4.84 d
Rotational velocity (v sin i)	12.81 km/s
Age	237±33 Myr

HN Peg B
Radius	0.101 R_{☉}
Surface gravity (log g)	4.81 cgs
Temperature	1,115 K

Other designations
- HN Peg, BD+14°4668, FK5 3737, GJ 836.7, HD 206860, HIP 107350, HR 8314, SAO 107364

Database references
SIMBAD	HN Peg A
- HN Peg B

HN Pegasi is the variable star designation for a young, Sun-like star in the northern constellation of Pegasus. It has an apparent visual magnitude of 5.9, which, according to the Bortle scale, indicates that it is visible to the naked eye from suburban skies. Parallax measurements put the star at a distance of around 59 light years from the Sun, but it is drifting closer with a radial velocity of −16.7 km/s.

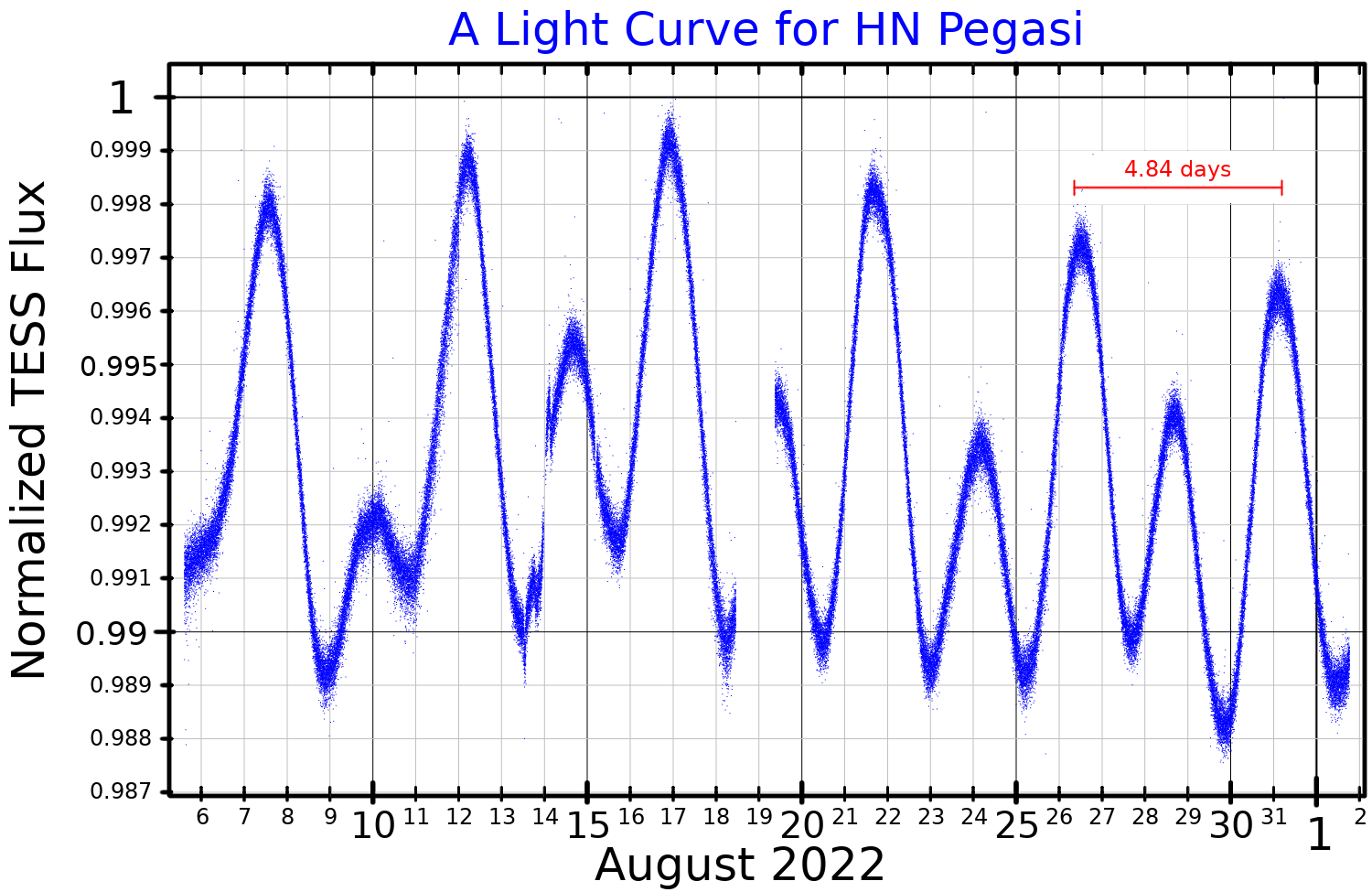
A light curve for HN Pegasi, plotted from TESS data. The 4.84 day rotation period is marked in red.

This is a G-type main sequence star with a stellar classification of G0 V CH–0.5 and an estimated age of just 237 million years. It has slightly more mass and a slightly larger radius than the Sun, but a somewhat lower metallicity. It is spinning relatively quickly, with an estimated rotation period of 4.84 days.

The surface magnetic field of the star has a complex and variable geometry. It is a BY Draconis variable star with an active chromosphere, which means there is a rotational modulation of its luminosity due to star spots. Much like the Sun, the star spot activity undergoes a periodic cycle of maxima and minima lasting roughly 5.5±0.3 yr. Its apparent magnitude varies between a maximum of 5.92 and a minimum of 5.95 over a period of 24.9 days. However, the rotation period is on average 4.84 days. The star shows an anti-solar pattern of rotation, with the rotation rate steadily increasing during each cycle before dropping back to the initial value upon the start of a new cycle.

In 2006, the discovery of a brown dwarf companion was announced. HN Peg B was spotted using the Spitzer Space Telescope at an angular separation of 43.2 arc sec, showing a methane absorption characteristic of T-type dwarfs. The separation corresponds to a projected physical distance of 795 AU, which is uncommonly wide for such brown dwarf companions. While NASA provides HN Peg b as an exoplanet with the mass of almost 22 M_{J} and having an orbit of 20692 years. other sources provide an estimated mass of HN Peg B as brown dwarf of 12 - 28 M_{J} with a most likely mass of 28 M_{J} at age ~500 Myr. Based upon its spectrum, HN Peg B has relatively thin cloud decks. HN Peg B was observed with Hubble WFC3 and found to be variable in the 1.1–1.7 μm range. It varied with an amplitude of 1.206 ±0.025% and a rotation period of 15.4 ±0.5 hours. The water absorption band at 1.4 μm had a reduced amplitude. The condensation particles causing the variation have a particle size larger than 1 μm. It also showed variability in a Spitzer light curve, with an amplitude of 1.1 ±0.5% at 4.5 μm and 0.77 ±0.15% at 3.6 μm.

This star displays an emission of infrared excess that suggests there is a circumstellar disk of debris in orbit. HN Pegasi is most likely a thin disk population star. It is a member of the nearby Hercules-Lyra association of stars that share a common motion through space. Newer investigations conclude that HN Peg B is likely older at >≈ 500 Myr, while a mass of 28 M_{J} is predicted for an age of 500 Myr.
