= V921 Scorpii b =

Candidate brown dwarf orbiting variable star

Discovery
- Discovery date: 2019
- Detection method: Imaging

Orbital characteristics
- Semi-major axis: 835 au
- Star: V921 Scorpii

Physical characteristics
- Mass: 60 M_{J}

V921 Scorpii b is a candidate 60-Jupiter-mass brown dwarf orbiting V921 Scorpii, a 20-solar-mass 30,000 K Herbig Haro B0IV-class subgiant. The object is 835 AU away from V921 Scorpii. Despite the large distance, V921 Scorpii b receives a comparable amount of irradiation as Mars, owing to the large mass and luminosity of V921 Scorpii.

While this candidate object is likely a brown dwarf, it is included in the Extrasolar Planets Encyclopaedia since it includes substellar objects with masses up to 60 Jupiter masses.

== Host star ==
With 20 solar masses in mass and 30,000 K in temperature, V921 Scorpii is a Herbig Haro B0IV-class subgiant and the most massive star to host a substellar object.
