= 2MASS J09393548−2448279 =

System of two stars in the constellation Antlia

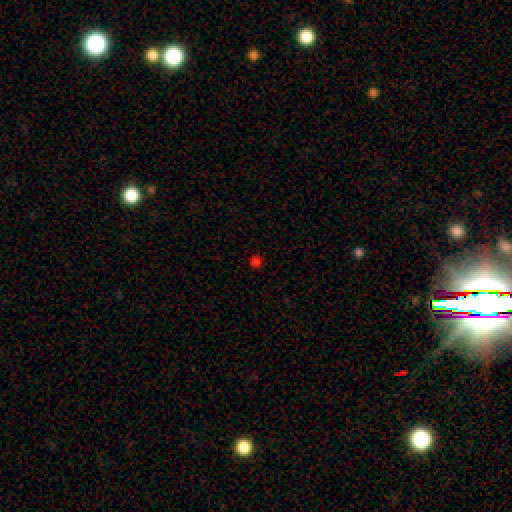
- 2MASS 0939-2448 (faint red dot) (legacy surveys)

Observation data Epoch J2000 Equinox ICRS
- Constellation: Antlia
- Right ascension: 09^{h} 39^{m} 35.48^{s}
- Declination: −24° 48′ 27.9″

Characteristics
- Spectral type: T8
- Apparent magnitude (J): 15.61 ± 0.09
- Apparent magnitude (H): 15.96 ± 0.09
- Apparent magnitude (K): 16.83 ± 0.09

Astrometry
Proper motion (μ)	RA: +573.4 ± 2.3 mas/yr Dec.: −1044.7 ± 2.5 mas/yr
Parallax (π)	187.3±4.6 mas
Distance	17.4 ± 0.4 ly (5.3 ± 0.1 pc)

Details

2MASS 0939-2448 A
Mass	20–50 M_{Jup}
Radius	1.22^{+0.1}_{−0.09} R_{Jup}
Luminosity	0.000002 L_{☉}
Surface gravity (log g)	4.88^{+0.2}_{−0.4} cgs
Temperature	611^{+17}_{−24} K
Metallicity	−0.3–0.0
Age	2–10 Gyr

2MASS 0939-2448 B
Mass	20–40 M_{Jup}
Radius	0.09 R_{☉}
Temperature	600–700 K
Metallicity	−0.3–0.0
Age	2–10 Gyr

Other designations
- 2MASS J09393548−2448279

Database references
SIMBAD	data
- Location of 2MASS 0939−2448 in the constellation Antlia

2MASS J09393548−2448279 (abbreviated 2MASS 0939−2448) is a probable system of two nearby T-type brown dwarfs, located in constellation Antlia at 17.4 light-years from Earth.

== Discovery ==
2MASS 0939−2448 was identified as a brown dwarf through analysis of data from the 2MASS survey by Tinney et al. The discovery was published in 2005.

== Properties ==
Model calculations suggest that 2MASS 0939−2448 is a system of two brown dwarfs with effective temperatures of about 500 and 700 K and masses of about 25 and 40 Jupiter masses; it is also possible that it is a pair of identical objects with temperatures of 600 K and 30 Jupiter masses.

In 2025 it was discovered that the brown dwarf is variable in the J-band with Gemini South. It showed an amplitude of 4.6±0.4 mmag and a rotation period of 1.733±0.040 h. This period could however be part of a larger rotation period. The variability at 1.2 μm is likely connected to high-altitude clouds, made of chemicals such as Na_{2}S or KCl, as well as a haze layer. Additionally the variability could be due to hot spots caused by aurorae. The fast rotating T-dwarfs were connected to radio emission, connected to aurorae, so the researchers suggest follow-up observations with radio telescopes. The same work detected variability for the T8-dwarf EQ J1959-3338. The work also suggests that the spin increases with age for brown dwarfs.

== Dimness ==
From publication of the discovery in 2005 till at least 2008, 2MASS 0939−2448, or its dimmer component, was the dimmest brown dwarf known. Later dimmer objects, including (sub)brown dwarfs and rogue planets of new spectral class Y, were discovered, using data from WISE and from other surveys. In 2011–2014, the dimmest known of these objects was WISE 1828+2650, and from 2014 the dimmest one is WISE 0855−0714.
