= 82 Cancri =

Star in the constellation Cancer

- Location of 82 Cancri (circled)

Observation data Epoch J2000.0 Equinox J2000.0 (ICRS)
- Constellation: Cancer
- Right ascension: 09^{h} 15^{m} 13.852^{s}
- Declination: +14° 56′ 29.43″
- Apparent magnitude (V): +5.33

Characteristics
- Evolutionary stage: red giant branch
- Spectral type: K1 III
- U−B color index: +1.31
- B−V color index: +1.32

Astrometry
Radial velocity (R_{v})	+27.49±0.19 km/s
Proper motion (μ)	RA: −41.018 mas/yr Dec.: −11.304 mas/yr
Parallax (π)	5.6869±0.0902 mas
Distance	574 ± 9 ly (176 ± 3 pc)
Absolute magnitude (M_{V})	−0.98

Details
Mass	2.56±0.13 M_{☉}
Radius	31.32+0.85 −0.64 R_{☉}
Luminosity	435+10 −12 L_{☉}
Surface gravity (log g)	2.04±0.02 cgs
Temperature	4,703+18 −27 K
Metallicity [Fe/H]	−0.195±0.099 dex
Rotational velocity (v sin i)	1.3±1.0 km/s

Other designations
- π^{2} Cnc, 82 Cancri, BD+15°2009, FK5 2733, HD 79554, HIP 45410, HR 3669, SAO 98456

Database references
SIMBAD	data

82 Cancri is a solitary, orange-hued star in the zodiac constellation of Cancer. It has the Bayer designation Pi^{2} Cancri, which is Latinized from π^{2} Cancri; 82 Cancri is the star's Flamsteed designation. The star lies just a degree to the south of the ecliptic. With an apparent visual magnitude of +5.33, it is dimly visible to the naked eye on a dark night. This star is located at a distance of approximately 574 light-years (176 pc) from the Sun based on parallax measurements. At that range, the visual magnitude is diminished by an extinction of 0.10 magnitudes due to interstellar dust. It is drifting further away with a radial velocity of +27.5 km/s.

This is an evolved K-type giant star with a stellar classification of K1 III, having exhausted the supply of hydrogen at its core then cooled and expanded off the main sequence. The star 2.6 times the Sun's mass and has expanded to 31 times the girth of the Sun. It is spinning slowly with a projected rotational velocity. This star is radiating 435 times the Sun's luminosity from its enlarged photosphere at an effective temperature of 4,703 K. Based on its abundance of iron, the star has a lower abundances of heavier elements than the Sun.
