= List of coolest stars =

This is a list of coolest stars and brown dwarfs discovered, arranged by decreasing temperature. The stars with temperatures lower than 2,000 K are included.

== Coolest main sequence stars ==
Include stars with temperatures lower than 2,500 Kelvin.

Star name	Temperature (K)	Spectral type	Distance (light years)	Notes
CWISE J1249+3621	1,715–2,320	sdL1	408	
2MASS J0523-1403	1,939	L2.5V	41.62	The coolest main sequence star known as of 2023.

== Coolest giant stars ==
Include giants with temperatures lower than 2,000 Kelvin.

Star name	Temperature (K)	Spectral type	Distance (light years)	Notes
S Cassiopeiae	1,800	S3,4–S5,8	3,100±300	
LL Pegasi	1,800	C	4,200	
RW Leonis Minoris	1,800	C4,3	1,053	
V Coronae Borealis	1,800	C6,2e_MS3	2,100	
V384 Persei	1,820	N		
T Draconis	1,850	C6,2e		
V346 Puppis	1,875	C		
Leo A 22	1,900	C	2,600,000	
S Aurigae	1,940	C-N5+		
V1426 Cygni	1,975	C7,2e		
Sextans A 20	2,000	C	4,310,000	
Leo A 226	2,000	C	2,600,000	
Sextans A 100	2,000	C	4,310,000	
IRC +30374	2,000	C	3,900	
IRC +60144	2,000	C	3,400	
CZ Hydrae	2,000	C	7,200	
SS Virginis	2,000	C-N4.5	2,100	

== Coolest brown dwarfs ==
Include brown dwarfs with temperatures lower than 500 Kelvin.

Star name	Temperature (K)	Spectral type	Distance (light years)	Notes
WISE 0855–0714	276	Y4	7.426±0.039	
JADES-GS-BD-5	301 - 306	>Y1	209	One of the most distant Y-type brown dwarfs. Discovered by JWST.
WISE 0336-0143B	295±10 - 308±20	Y1?	32.7	spectral type is not yet published, but should be around Y1 if we assume MIRI F480M is similar to W2 and by using Figure 13 from Kirkpatrick et al. 2012 Might be a later spectral type.
Bullet-BD1	296 - 324	Y	522 - 783	Discovered by JWST and originally identified as a candidate high-redshift galaxy.
WISE 1935-15 B	325+20 −34	>Y1	47.06	A binary system consisting of two Y-type dwarfs.
MEAD 62 B	299±20 - 343+7 −11	Y	66.8	A candidate secondary companion in a binary with a white dwarf.
JADES-GS-BD-21	340 - 347	Y	2413 - 2935	Discovered by JWST.
WISE J2354+0240	347+13 −11	Y1	24.97	
SMDET-1	~349	>Y0.8?	<24.14	A nearby Y-type dwarf candidate which went undetected due to being hidden in front of a background star.
WISE J0830+2837	300 - 350	>Y1	26.87	uncertain parallax and spectral type is an estimate
Capotauro	350 K	Y1 ± 0.5	2380±360	This object discovered by JWST was initially considered the possible most distant galaxy known with a redshift of 32, later determined to be a Y-type brown dwarf after the discovery of proper motion.
CWISEP J1446−2317	351+16 −13	>Y1	37.75	uncertain parallax and spectral type is an estimate
WISE 2209+2711	355+13 −11	Y0:	20.17	
WD 0806-661B	357±3	Y1	62.80	spectral type is an estimate
CWISEP 0238-1332	367±79	>Y1	58.66	uncertain parallax and spectral type is an estimate
CWISEP 0402-2651	367±79	>Y1	39.53	uncertain parallax and spectral type is an estimate
WISEU 0503-5648	367±79	>Y1	33.18	spectral type is an estimate
CWISEP 0940+5233	367±79	>Y1	43.49	uncertain parallax and spectral type is an estimate
WISEA 1257+7153	367±79	>Y1	54.18	spectral type is an estimate
WISEA 1930-2059	367±79	>Y1	30.67	spectral type is an estimate
CWISEP 1935-1546	367±79	>Y1	47.06	spectral type is an estimate
CWISEP 2230+2549	367±79	>Y1	52.44	uncertain parallax and spectral type is an estimate
CWISEP 2256+4002	367±79	>Y1	32.04	spectral type is an estimate
WISE 0825+2805	387±15	Y0.5	21.37	
WISE 1828+2650	387±22	Y2V	32.5	Temperature could be lower. If it is a binary, its components could be as cold as about 275–350 K.
WISE 0350-5658	388±88	Y1	18.49	
WISE 1405+5534	392+16 −15	Y0.5(pec?)	20.62	
WISE 0647-6232	393±88	Y1	32.78	
CWISEP J1047+5457	395+23 −21	Y0	43.37	spectral type is an estimate
WISE 1935-15 A	404±20	Y	47.06	A binary system of two Y-type brown dwarfs.
WISEPA 1541-2250	411+18 −17	Y1	19.54	
CWISEP 0321+6932	412±79	Y0.5	47.61	spectral type is an estimate
WISE 1639-6847	412±88	Y0pec	14.85	
CWISEP 2356-4814	412±79	Y0.5	56.62	spectral type is an estimate
WISE 0336-0143A	440±24	Y0	32.7	
JADES-GN-BD-5	398 - 448	Y	2707 - 2837	Discovered by JWST.
JADES-GN-BD-8	400 - 450	Y	1076 - 1990	Discovered by JWST.
JADES-GN-BD-9	441 - 450	Y	2740 - 3881	Discovered by JWST.
WISEPA 1738+2732	450±88	Y0	24.92	
WISEPA 0410+1502	451±88	Y0	21.56	
WISE 2220-3628	452±88	Y0	34.15	
WISE 1534-1043	453±77	sdY?	53	possibly halo brown dwarf
WISE 0146+4234B	460±79	Y0	63.09	
WISEA 0302-5817	460±79	Y0:	54.45	
CWISEP 0634+5049	460±79	Y0	52.61	spectral type is an estimate
CWISEP 0859+5349	460±79	Y0	60.62	spectral type is an estimate
CWISE 0925-4720	460±79	Y0	34.96	spectral type is an estimate
CWISEP 0938+0634	460±79	Y0	61.31	uncertain parallax and spectral type is an estimate
CWISE 1121-6232	460±79	Y0	33.69	spectral type is an estimate
WISEA J1141−3326	460±79	Y0	31.36	
WISE 1217+1626 B	460±79	Y0-0.5	33	
CWISE 1531-3306	460±79	Y0	55.37	spectral type is an estimate
WISENF 1936+0408	460±79	Y0	28.64	spectral type is an estimate
CWISEP 2011-4812	460±79	Y0	45.94	spectral type is an estimate
WISEA 2243-1458	460±79	Y0	47,75	spectral type is an estimate
WISE 1112-3857	461±88	T9	31.79	
WISE 0713-2917	464±88	Y0	29.84	
WISE J0304−2705	465±88	Y0~pec	44.62	
WISE 0734-7157	466+28 −23	Y0	43.78	
WISE 0359-5401	443+23 −19 - 467+16 −18	Y0	44.31	
WISE 0943+3607	468±88	T9.5	33.59	
WISE J1206+8401	472+26 −30	Y0	38.51	
WISE 0833+0052	472±88	(sd)T9	40.92	possible subdwarf
WISE 1542+2230	472±88	T9.5	38.69	
WISE 0811-8051	479±88	T9.5:	32.91	
WISEPA 2134-7137	481±88	T9~pec	29.73	possible subdwarf
WISEPC 2056+1459	481+26 −20	Y0	23.16	
JADES-GS-BD-8	404 - 486	Y	1500 - 3000	Discovered by JWST.
WISE 2212-6931	487±88	T9	40.47	Discovered by JWST.
WISEPA 0751-7634	492±88	T9	33.32	
WISE 0335+4310	492±88	T9	38.46	
WISE 0535-7500	495+28 −23	>=Y1:	47.48	
WISE 04305+4633	495+28 −23	T8	34.08	
JADES-GS-BD-4	483 - 498	Y	3500 - 4175	Discovered by JWST.
PANO-GS-BD-18	487 - 498	Y	1174 - 1435	Discovered by JWST.

== See also ==
- List of most massive stars
- List of hottest stars
- List of largest stars
