= WISE 0647−6232 =

Brown dwarf in the constellation Pictor

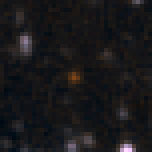
- WISE 0647-6232; Credit: unWISE

Observation data Epoch J2000 Equinox J2000
- Constellation: Pictor
- Right ascension: 06^{h} 47^{m} 23.2270^{s}
- Declination: −62° 32′ 39.744″

Characteristics
- Spectral type: Y1±0.5
- Apparent magnitude (J (LCO filter system)): >23.0±0.1
- Apparent magnitude (J (MKO filter system)): 22.65±0.27
- Apparent magnitude (H (LCO filter system)): >21.7±0.3
- Apparent magnitude (H (MKO filter system)): 23.40±0.29
- Apparent magnitude (W1): >19.09
- Apparent magnitude (W2): 15.32±0.08
- Apparent magnitude (W3): >13.49
- Apparent magnitude (W4): >9.66

Astrometry
Proper motion (μ)	RA: +1.19±1.18 mas/yr Dec.: +393.81±0.78 mas/yr
Parallax (π)	110.06±2.25 mas
Distance	29.6 ± 0.6 ly (9.1 ± 0.2 pc)

Details
Mass	5–30 M_{Jup}
Surface gravity (log g)	3.0–5.0 cgs
Temperature	350–400 K

Other designations
- WISE J064723.23−623235.5; WISE 0647−6232

Database references
SIMBAD	data

WISE J064723.23−623235.5 (abbreviated WISE 0647−6232) is a nearby brown dwarf of spectral type Y1±0.5, located in constellation Pictor at approximately 32.5 light-years from Earth. It is one of the two or three reddest and one of the four latest-type brown dwarfs known.

== History of observations ==
=== Discovery ===
WISE 0647−6232 was discovered by Kirkpatrick et al. from data, collected by Wide-field Infrared Survey Explorer (WISE) Earth-orbiting satellite—NASA infrared-wavelength 40-cm (16-in) space telescope, which mission lasted from December 2009 to February 2011. The discovery was announced in 2013. WISE 0647−6232 was first imaged by WISE on 9 May 2010. On 17 June 2010 after preliminary data processing it was uncovered as a very cold brown dwarf candidate.

Then were carried out follow-up observations:

- using the Infrared Array Camera (IRAC) on Spitzer Space Telescope, starting from MJD 55458.43 (possibly 16 September 2010);
- J- and H-band images using Persson's Auxiliary Nasmyth Infrared Camera (PANIC) at the 6.5-meter Magellan Baade telescope at the Las Campanas Observatory, Chile, on 25 November 2010;
- with the FourStar infrared camera also at Magellan Baade telescope on 15 January 2013 and 23 March 2013;
- with the Folded-port InfraRed Echellette (FIRE) spectrograph also at Magellan Baade telescope on 24 March 2013;
- using the Wide Field Camera 3 (WFC3) on Hubble Space Telescope on 13–14 May 2013, and pre-image was obtained on 11 February 2013.

On 25 August 2013 Kirkpatrick et al. submitted the discovery paper to The Astrophysical Journal. WISE 0647−6232 became the 17th Y-type dwarf discovered and confirmed spectroscopically (in addition, WD 0806-661B is also almost certainly a Y-type dwarf, which was found before discovery of WISE 0647−6232, but it still lacks a spectroscopical confirmation).

== Distance ==
Currently the most accurate distance estimate of WISE 0647−6232 is a trigonometric parallax, published in 2019 by Kirkpatrick et al.: 10.0±0.2 pc, or 32.5±0.8 ly.

WISE 0647-6232 distance estimates
Source	Parallax, mas	Distance, pc	Distance, ly	Ref.
Kirkpatrick et al. (2013)	115±12	8.7^{+1.0}_{−0.8}	28.4^{+3.3}_{−2.7}	
Kirkpatrick et al. (2019)	**100.3±2.4**	**10.0±0.2**	**32.5±0.8**	

The most reliable estimate is marked in bold.

== Properties ==
WISE 0647−6232 has effective temperature 350–400 K and mass ~5–30 M_{Jup}, but its kinematics suggests that it may belong to Columba moving group (probability of this is 92.9%, and corresponding radial velocity should be ~22 km/s), if it is so, it may be very young (~30 Myr) and have even lower mass (<2 M_{Jup}). Its blue J − H color may suggest that its surface gravity may be relatively low (log(g)=3.0–3.5, where g is in units of cm·s^{−2}). For ages from 0.1 to more than 10 Gyr log(g)=4.0–5.0. One team found a 93.2% probability of this object belonging to a group called OCEMG, which would result in a mass of 4.6+3.0
−2.2 M_{J}.

The only redder than WISE 0647−6232 confirmed Y dwarf is WISE 1828+2650. WD 0806-661B may also be redder than WISE 0647−6232.

The other three latest-type Y dwarfs are: WISE 0350−5658 (Y1), WISE 0535−7500 (≥Y1) and WISE 1828+2650 (≥Y2).

== See also ==
- List of star systems within 30–35 light-years
- List of Y-dwarfs
