= WISEPA J022623.98−021142.8 =

Brown dwarf binary in constellation Cetus

WISE 0226−0211
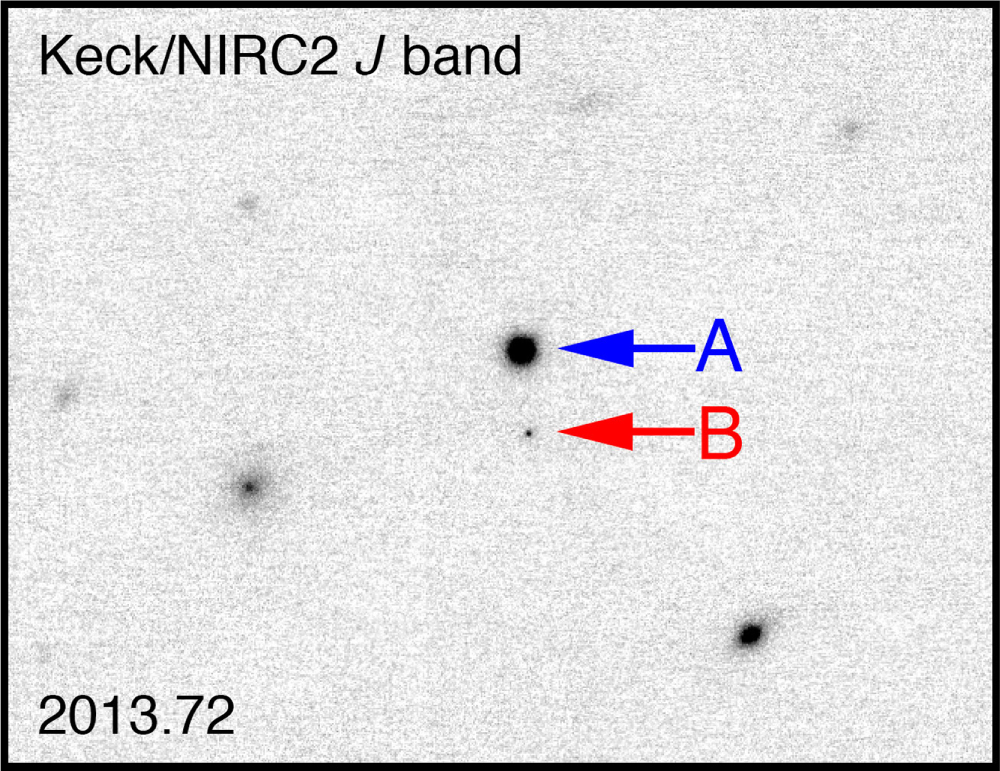
- Keck image of WISE 0226−0211AB; Credit: Keck Observatory; Brooks et al.

Observation data Epoch J2000 Equinox J2000
- Constellation: Cetus
- Right ascension: 02^{h} 26^{m} 24.20^{s}
- Declination: −02° 11′ 37.7″

Characteristics
- Evolutionary stage: brown dwarf
- Spectral type: T8+Y0

Astrometry
Proper motion (μ)	RA: -294.4 ±1.4 mas/yr Dec.: -432.3 ±1.2 mas/yr
Parallax (π)	56.3±2.5 mas
Distance	58 ± 3 ly (17.8 ± 0.8 pc)

Details

WISE 0226−0211A
Temperature	686 ± 79 K

WISE 0226−0211B
Temperature	511 ± 79 K

Position (relative to WISE 0226−0211A)
Component	WISE 0226−0211B
Angular distance	2.1″

Other designations
- CNS5 617, WISEA J022623.99−021142.7, WISEP J022623.98−021142.8, WISE J022623.98−021142.8, EQ J0226−0211

Database references
SIMBAD	data

WISE 0226−0211 (also known as WISEPA J022623.98−021142.8) is a brown dwarf binary with a combined spectral type of T7. Its individual components have a spectral type that is as of now somewhat uncertain at T8–T8.5 for the primary and T9.5-Y0 for the secondary.

The object was first discovered in 2011 with the Wide-field Infrared Survey Explorer and follow-up observations with Keck revealed a spectral type of T7. In 2019 the same team showed that the object is a common proper motion binary with a separation of 2.1 arcseconds from Spitzer images and one H-band Keck image (acquired by David Ciardi). The H-ch2 colors suggest a spectral type of about T8–T8.5 for the primary and about Y0 for the secondary. The absolute magnitudes on the other hand suggest spectral types of about T8–T8.5 for the primary and about T9.5–Y0 for the secondary. It is suspected that the combined spectral type of T7 is in error.

== See also ==
- List of Y-dwarfs

other late T to Y dwarf binaries:

- WISE 1217+1626 T9+Y0
- WISE J0336−0143 Y+Y
- CFBDSIR J1458+1013 T9+Y0
- WISE 0146+4234 T9+Y0
- WISE J1711+3500 T8+T9.5
