= WISEPA J171104.60+350036.8 =

WISE J1711+3500 is a binary brown dwarf

WISE J1711+3500
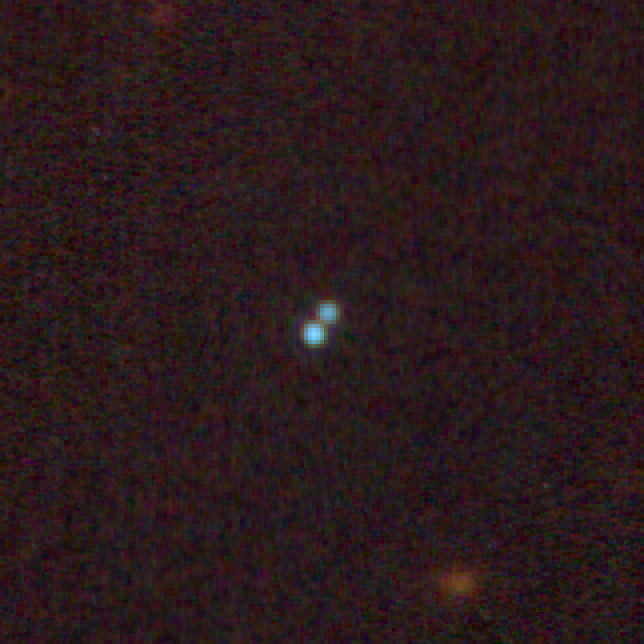
- WISE J1711+3500 with JWST MIRI. The primary is on the lower left.

Observation data Epoch J2000 Equinox J2000
- Constellation: Hercules
- Right ascension: 17^{h} 11^{m} 04.73^{s}
- Declination: +35° 00′ 37.63″

Characteristics
- Evolutionary stage: brown dwarf
- Spectral type: T8+T9.5

Astrometry
Proper motion (μ)	RA: −157.6 ±0.6 mas/yr Dec.: −76.3 ±0.6 mas/yr
Parallax (π)	43.3±1.9 mas
Distance	75 ± 3 ly (23 ± 1 pc)

Details

WISE J1711+3500A
Mass	19–23 M_{J} or 44–48 M_{Jup}
Temperature	675–870 K

WISE J1711+3500B
Mass	8.1–10.7 M_{J} or 20–26 M_{Jup}
Temperature	420–540 K

Position (relative to WISE J1711+3500A)
Component	WISE J1711+3500B
Angular distance	780.0 ±2.0 mas
Projected separation	15.0 ±2.0 AU

Other designations
- ** LIM 6, CNS5 4209, WDS J17111+3501AB, WISEA J171104.59+350036.7, WISEP J171104.60+350036.8, WISE J171104.60+350036.8, EQ J1711+3500

Database references
SIMBAD	data

WISE J1711+3500 (also known as WISEPA J171104.60+350036.8) is a binary consisting of a brown dwarf and a planetary-mass object or brown dwarf. Both objects are late T dwarfs.

WISE J1711+3500 was discovered in 2011 with the Wide-field Infrared Survey Explorer and with a spectrum from NASA IRTF as a T8 dwarf. In 2012 it was discovered that this object is a binary from imaging with the Keck telescope. The individual spectral types were estimated to be T8 for the primary and T9.5 for the secondary. The pair is separated by 15 ± 2 astronomical units (AU). For an age of 1 billion years the masses are around 19–23 M_{J} for the primary and around 8.1–10.7 M_{J} for the secondary. For an age of 5 billion years the masses are around 44–48 M_{J} for the primary and 20–26 M_{J} for the secondary. The orbital period was poorly constrained, but is larger than 200 years.

== See also ==
- List of directly imaged exoplanets

Other late T to Y dwarf binaries:

- WISE 1217+1626 T9+Y0
- WISE J0336−0143 Y+Y
- CFBDSIR J1458+1013 T9+Y0
- WISE 0146+4234 T9+Y0
- WISE 0226−0211 T8+Y0?
