= WISE 0359−5401 =

Star in the constellation Reticulum

WISE J035934.06−540154.6
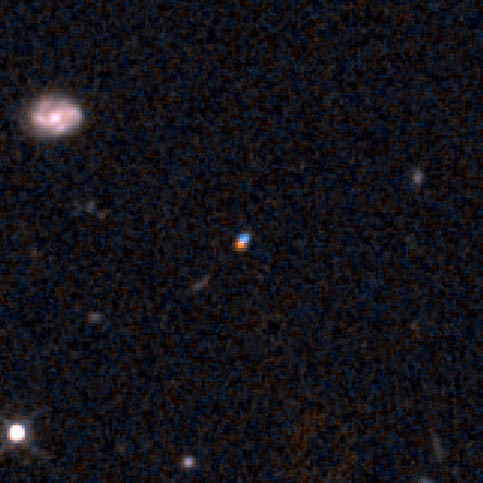
- WISE 0359−5401 as seen by Hubble; Credit: NASA/ESA Hubble Space Telescope

Observation data Epoch J2000 Equinox J2000
- Constellation: Reticulum
- Right ascension: 03^{h} 59^{m} 34.06^{s}
- Declination: −54° 01′ 54.6″

Characteristics
- Spectral type: Y0
- Apparent magnitude (J (MKO-NIR filter system)): 21.56±0.24
- Apparent magnitude (H (MKO-NIR filter system)): 22.20±0.43

Astrometry
| Proper motion (μ) | RA: −177±53 mas/yr Dec.: −930±62 mas/yr |
| Parallax (π) | 73.6±2.0 mas |
| Distance | 44 ± 1 ly (13.6 ± 0.4 pc) |

Details
| Mass | 10.4+1.5 −1.1 M_{Jup} |
| Radius | 0.94±0.02 R_{Jup} |
| Luminosity | 10^{−6.43+0.05 −0.06} L_{☉} |
| Surface gravity (log g) | 4.46+0.06 −0.04 cgs |
| Temperature | 458±15 K |
| Metallicity | $\begin{smallmatrix}\left[\ce{M}/\ce{H}\right]\end{smallmatrix}$ = −0.04±0.02 |
| Rotation | 2.44±0.01 h |
| Age | ~2 Gyr |

Other designations
- WISE J035934.06−540154.6, WISE 0359−5401

Database references
| SIMBAD | data |
- Location of WISE 0359−5401 in the constellation Reticulum

WISE J035934.06−540154.6 (designation abbreviated to WISE 0359−5401) is a brown dwarf, sub-brown dwarf or rogue planet of spectral class Y0, located in constellation Reticulum. It is estimated to be approximately 44 light-years from Earth.

A study with Spitzer found this Y-dwarf to be variable. In this sample of 14 Y-dwarfs it had the shortest period of 2.44 hours and showed strong variability in all 4 light curves. The researchers claim it is the perfect candidate for variability study with JWST.

== Discovery ==
WISE 0359−5401 was discovered in 2012 by J. Davy Kirkpatrick and colleagues from data collected by the Wide-field Infrared Survey Explorer (WISE) in the infrared at a wavelength of 4.6 μm (1.8 × 10^{−4} in), whose mission lasted from December 2009 to February 2011. In 2012 Kirkpatrick et al. published a paper in The Astrophysical Journal, where they presented discovery of seven new found by WISE brown dwarfs of spectral type Y, among which also was WISE 0359−5401.

== James Webb Space Telescope observation ==
In June 2023 WISE 0359−5401 became the first Y-dwarf with a spectral energy distribution measured by JWST. This includes a spectrum taken by NIRSpec and MIRI LRS at 1 to 12 μm, as well as MIRI photometry at 15, 18 and 21 μm. The molecules water (H_{2}O), methane (CH_{4}), carbon monoxide (CO), carbon dioxide (CO_{2}) and ammonia (NH_{3}) were detected in WISE 0359−5401. Methane is the main reservoir of carbon, but there is enough carbon for detectable carbon monoxide and carbon dioxide. The study also measured a temperature of 467 K (194 °C, 381 °F).

The mass and age remained uncertain. There was a disagreement between model fits and semi-empirical measurements. The semi-empirical measurements suggested a mass of about 9 to 31 M_{Jup} according to an age estimate of 1 to 10 Gyrs and the measured bolometric luminosity. The model fit on the other hand suggested a mass of 1 M_{Jup} and an age of 20 Myrs, due to a low surface gravity. The low age and mass from the model fit was not in agreement with simulations, which predict nearby Y-dwarfs to be old with a median age of 5 Gyrs.

Newer models resolved this discrepancy. These models included disequilibrium chemistry, which was included in older models, as well as a pressure-temperature (P-T) profile that is not in the standard adiabatic form. Usually brown dwarfs have an increasing pressure and temperature with increasing depth. Brown dwarfs however rotate rapidly, which disrupts the convection and influences the heat transfer. This leads to colder lower layers of the atmosphere. These newer ATMO2020++ models fit better to the spectrum of WISE 0359−5401 and produce more realistic surface gravity, age, mass and metallicity. WISE 0359−5401 according to the newer models has a solar metallicity, a surface gravity of log g = 4.5, an age of about 2.5 billion years and a mass of about 14 M_{Jup}.

Both old and new models produce a better fit with an atmosphere that does not contain the molecule phosphine (PH_{3}), which was previously suspected to exist in cold brown dwarfs. Phosphine exists in the atmosphere of the Solar System giant planets. It is suspected that a different composition and gravity could mean that phosphorus exists in a different form in the atmosphere.

Another work used atmospheric retrieval to analyse the JWST spectrum and obtained mixing ratios for the major absorbers H_{2}O, CH_{4}, CO, CO_{2}, NH_{3}, PH_{3} and hydrogen sulfide (H_{2}S). The mixing ratio of phosphine is low enough to be consistent with a lack of phosphine. Hydrogen sulfide is not detected by any spectral features, but it is known to improve atmospheric retrieval of brown dwarfs. This work found signs of vigorous vertical mixing and was able to constrain the carbon to oxygen ratio to (C/O)_{atm} = 0.548 ±0.002.

== Distance ==
The trigonometric parallax of WISE 0359−5401 is 0.145±0.039 arcsec, corresponding to a direct inversion distance of 6.9+2.5
−1.5 pc, or 22.5+8.3
−4.8 ly. A more accurate measurement in 2023 found a parallax of 73.6±2.0 mas, corresponding to a distance of 13.6±0.4 pc, or 44±1 ly.

== See also ==
- List of star systems within 40–45 light-years
- List of Y-dwarfs

The other six discoveries of brown dwarfs, published in Kirkpatrick et al. (2012):

- WISE 0146+4234 (Y0)
- WISE 0350−5658 (Y1)
- WISE 0535−7500 (≥Y1)
- WISE 0713−2917 (Y0)
- WISE 0734−7157 (Y0)
- WISE 2220−3628 (Y0)
