= WISE 2220−3628 =

Brown dwarf in the constellation Grus

WISE J222055.31−362817.4
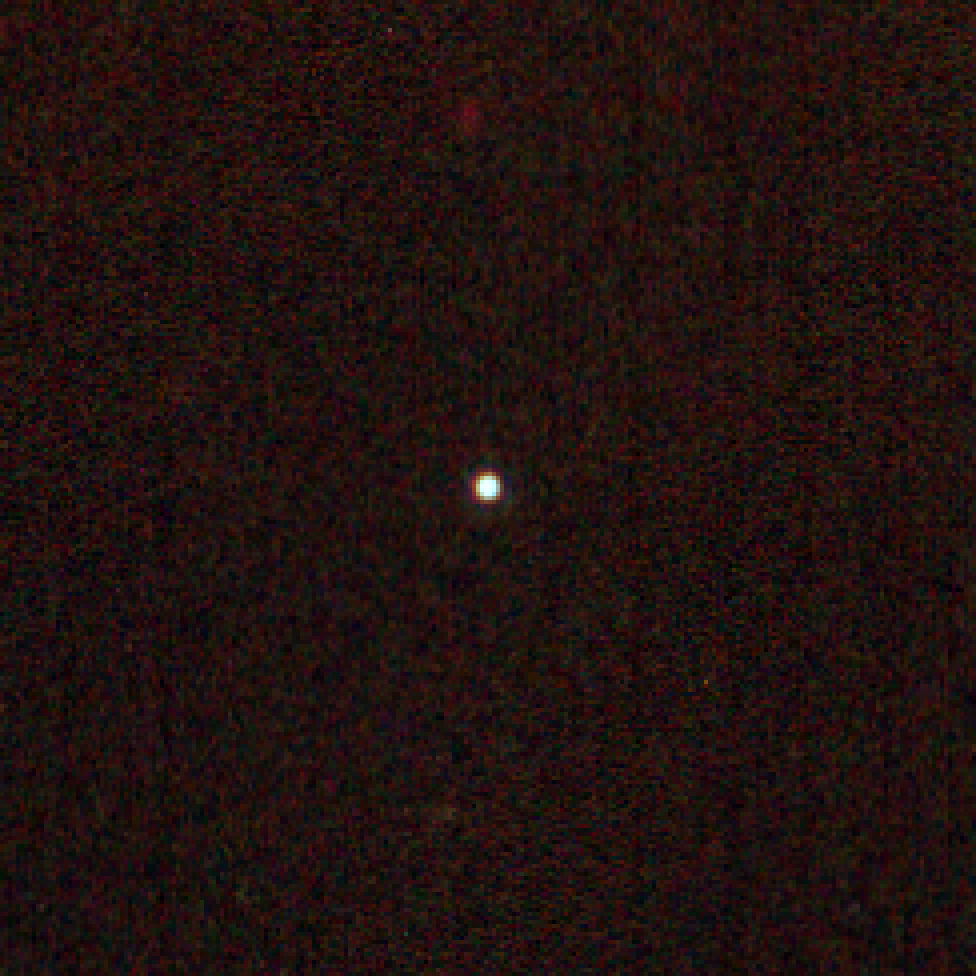
- WISE 2220-3628; Credit: NASA/ESA/CSA JWST MIRI

Observation data Epoch J2000 Equinox J2000
- Constellation: Grus
- Right ascension: 22^{h} 20^{m} 55.31^{s}
- Declination: −36° 28′ 17.4″

Characteristics
- Spectral type: Y0
- Apparent magnitude (J (MKO-NIR filter system)): 20.38 ± 0.17
- Apparent magnitude (H (MKO-NIR filter system)): 20.81 ± 0.30

Astrometry
Radial velocity (R_{v})	−53.2±2.8 km/s
Total velocity	55.33±2.82 km/s
Proper motion (μ)	RA: 288.92 ±0.15 mas/yr Dec.: −97.10 ±0.16 mas/yr
Parallax (π)	93.50±1.02 mas
Distance	34.9 ± 0.4 ly (10.7 ± 0.1 pc)

Details
Mass	6-35 M_{Jup}
Radius	0.94±0.14 R_{Jup}
Surface gravity (log g)	4.7±0.5 cgs
Temperature	480±41 K
Age	4.5±4.0 Gyr

Other designations
- WISE J222055.31−362817.4, WISE 2220−3628

Database references
SIMBAD	data

WISE J222055.31−362817.4 (designation abbreviated to WISE 2220−3628) is a brown dwarf of spectral class Y0, located in constellation Grus at approximately 34.2 light-years from Earth.

== Discovery ==
WISE 2220−3628 was discovered in 2012 by J. Davy Kirkpatrick et al. from data, collected by Wide-field Infrared Survey Explorer (WISE) Earth-orbiting satellite—NASA infrared-wavelength 40 cm (16 in) space telescope, which mission lasted from December 2009 to February 2011. In 2012 Kirkpatrick et al. published a paper in The Astrophysical Journal, where they presented discovery of seven new found by WISE brown dwarfs of spectral type Y, among which also was WISE 2220−3628.

== Properties ==
Y-class dwarfs are among the coldest of all brown dwarfs. WISE 2220-3628 was observed with JWST and found to be very similar to CWISEP J1935-1546, with the difference of having no signature of an aurora and no temperature inversion in its atmosphere.

== Distance ==
The most accurate distance estimate of WISE 2220−3628 was a trigonometric parallax, published in 2014 by Beichman et al.: 0.136 ± 0.017 arcsec, corresponding to a distance of 7.4 ± 0.9 pc (24.1 ± 2.9 ly). Later the parallax measurement was improved revealing a larger distance of about 34 light years.

== See also ==
- List of star systems within 30–35 light-years
- List of Y-dwarfs
- WISE 0146+4234 (Y0)
- WISE 0350−5658 (Y1)
- WISE 0359−5401 (Y0)
- WISE 0535−7500 (≥Y1)
- WISE 0713−2917 (Y0)
- WISE 0734−7157 (Y0)
