= WISE 0713−2917 =

Brown dwarf star in the constellation Canis Major

WISE J071322.55−291751.9
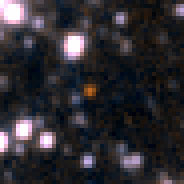
- WISE 0713-2917; Credit: unWISE

Observation data Epoch J2000 Equinox J2000
- Constellation: Canis Major
- Right ascension: 07^{h} 13^{m} 22.55^{s}
- Declination: −29° 17′ 51.9″

Characteristics
- Spectral type: Y0
- Apparent magnitude (J (MKO-NIR filter system)): 19.64 ± 0.15
- Apparent magnitude (J (SOAR/OSIRIS)): 20.06 ± 0.21
- Apparent magnitude (H (MKO-NIR filter system)): >19.3
- Apparent magnitude (H (SOAR/OSIRIS)): 21.16 ± 0.66

Astrometry
Proper motion (μ)	RA: 352.26 ±0.35 mas/yr Dec.: −408.52 ±0.32 mas/yr
Parallax (π)	110.11±0.61 mas
Distance	29.6 ± 0.2 ly (9.08 ± 0.05 pc)

Details
Temperature	464 ± 88 K

Other designations
- WISE J071322.55−291751.9, WISE 0713−2917

Database references
SIMBAD	data

WISE J071322.55−291751.9 (designation abbreviated to WISE 0713−2917) is a brown dwarf of spectral class Y0, located in constellation Canis Major at approximately 30 light-years from Earth.

== Discovery ==
WISE 0713−2917 was discovered in 2012 by J. Davy Kirkpatrick and colleagues from data collected by the Wide-field Infrared Survey Explorer (WISE) in the infrared at a wavelength of 40 cm (16 in), whose mission lasted from December 2009 to February 2011. In 2012 Kirkpatrick et al. published a paper in The Astrophysical Journal, where they presented discovery of seven new found by WISE brown dwarfs of spectral type Y, among which also was WISE 0713−2917.

== Distance ==
Currently the most accurate distance estimate of WISE 0713−2917 is a trigonometric parallax, published in 2014 by Beichman et al.: 0.106 ± 0.013 arcsec, corresponding to a distance of 9.4 ± 1.2 pc (30.7 ± 3.9 ly). An improved parallax was published in 2021, placing WISE 0713−2917 at around 30 light years.

== Physical properties ==
Mass estimates are 19−33 M_{J} and 13−19 M_{J} for WISE 0713−2917 depending on the study. No evidence for it being a binary was detected.

== See also ==
Lists:

- List of Y-dwarfs
- List of star systems within 25–30 light-years

The other six discoveries of brown dwarfs, published in Kirkpatrick et al. (2012):

- WISE 0146+4234 (Y0)
- WISE 0350−5658 (Y1)
- WISE 0359−5401 (Y0)
- WISE 0535−7500 (≥Y1)
- WISE 0734−7157 (Y0)
- WISE 2220−3628 (Y0)
