= WISE 0734−7157 =

Brown dwarf in the constellation Volans

WISE J073444.02−715744.0
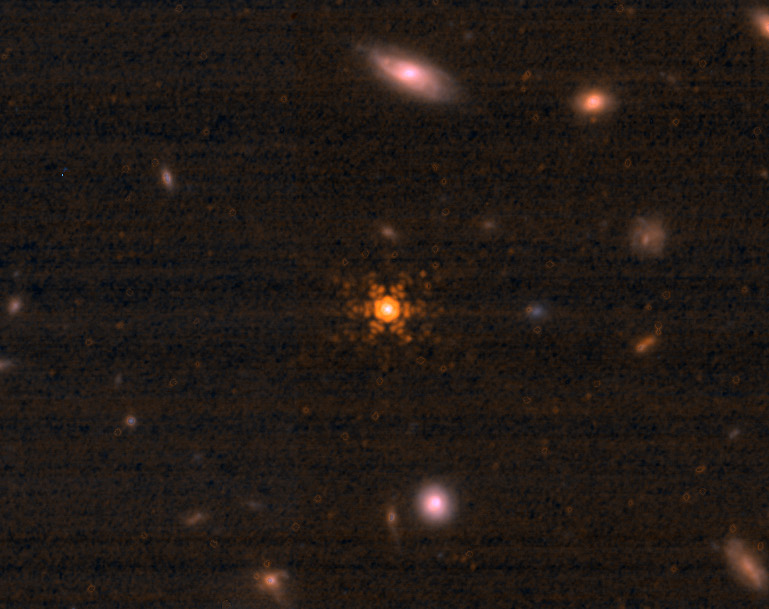
- WISE 0734-7157 is in the center of this image Credit: NASA/ESA/CSA JWST NIRCam; Loic Albert et al. & Melina Thévenot

Observation data Epoch J2000 Equinox J2000
- Constellation: Volans
- Right ascension: 07^{h} 34^{m} 44.02^{s}
- Declination: −71° 57′ 44″

Characteristics
- Spectral type: Y0
- Apparent magnitude (J (MKO-NIR filter system)): 20.41 ± 0.27

Astrometry
| Proper motion (μ) | RA: −565.67 ±0.16 mas/yr Dec.: −68.88 ±0.16 mas/yr |
| Parallax (π) | 73.35±0.71 mas |
| Distance | 44.5 ± 0.4 ly (13.6 ± 0.1 pc) |

Details
| Mass | 18+2 −3 M_{Jup} |
| Radius | 0.93±0.02 R_{Jup} |
| Surface gravity (log g) | 4.56+0.04 −0.05 cgs |
| Temperature | 481+5 −6 K |
| Metallicity | $\begin{smallmatrix}\left[\ce{M}/\ce{H}\right]\end{smallmatrix}$ = 0.16±0.02 |

Other designations
- WISE J073444.02−715744.0, WISE 0734−7157

Database references
| SIMBAD | data |

WISE J073444.02−715744.0 (designation abbreviated to WISE 0734−7157) is a brown dwarf of spectral class Y0, located in constellation Volans at approximately 43 light-years from Earth. It is one of the furthest Y0 brown dwarfs known.

== Discovery ==
WISE 0734−7157 was discovered in 2012 by J. Davy Kirkpatrick et al. from data, collected by Wide-field Infrared Survey Explorer (WISE) Earth-orbiting satellite—NASA infrared-wavelength 40 cm (16 in) space telescope, which mission lasted from December 2009 to February 2011. In 2012 Kirkpatrick et al. published a paper in The Astrophysical Journal, where they presented discovery of seven new found by WISE brown dwarfs of spectral type Y, among which also was WISE 0734−7157.

== Distance ==
Currently the most accurate distance estimate of WISE 0734−7157 is a trigonometric parallax, published in 2019 by Kirkpatrick et al.: 13.3+0.4
−0.4 pc, or 43.5+1.4
−1.3 ly.

== See also ==
The other six discoveries of brown dwarfs, published in Kirkpatrick et al. (2012):

- WISE 0146+4234 (Y0)
- WISE 0350−5658 (Y1)
- WISE 0359−5401 (Y0)
- WISE 0535−7500 (≥Y1)
- WISE 0713−2917 (Y0)
- WISE 2220−3628 (Y0)

Lists:

- List of star systems within 40–45 light-years
- List of Y-dwarfs
