= WD 0806−661 =

DQ white dwarf star in the constellation Volans

WD 0806−661 / Maru
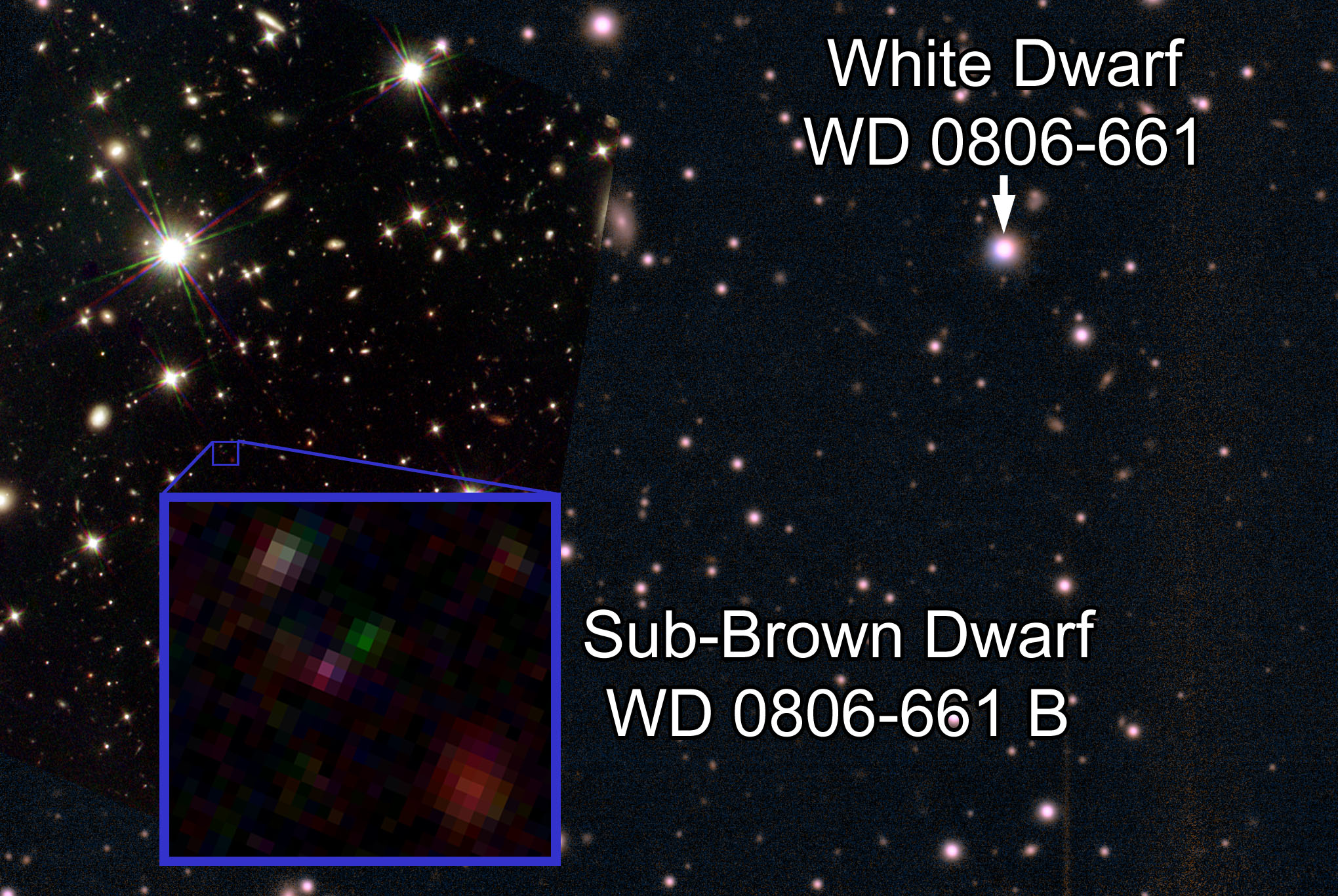
- The right side shows an image taken by ESO's VLT HAWK-I in near-infrared. The white dwarf is marked with an arrow. The left side shows an image taken by the NASA/ESA HST WFC3 also in near-infrared wavelengths. The sub-brown dwarf appears as green pixels (2014) and purple pixels (2015) in an inset.

Observation data Epoch J2000 Equinox J2000
- Constellation: Volans
- Right ascension: 08^{h} 06^{m} 53.75366^{s}
- Declination: −66° 18′ 16.7011″
- Apparent magnitude (V): 13.62

Characteristics
- Spectral type: DQ4.2 + Y1
- Apparent magnitude (B): 13.74
- Apparent magnitude (V): 13.71
- Apparent magnitude (R): 13.64
- Apparent magnitude (I): 13.60
- Apparent magnitude (J): 13.704 ± 0.023 / ~25.42
- Apparent magnitude (H): 13.739 ± 0.025 / ~25.29
- Apparent magnitude (K): 13.781 ± 0.043

Astrometry
Proper motion (μ)	RA: 335.519(16) mas/yr Dec.: −288.994(17) mas/yr
Parallax (π)	51.9970±0.0141 mas
Distance	62.73 ± 0.02 ly (19.232 ± 0.005 pc)
Absolute magnitude (M_{V})	12.30

Details

Component A
Mass	0.562±0.005 M_{☉}
Radius	0.0129 (Note: Calculated, using the Stefan-Boltzmann law and the star's effective temperature and luminosity, with respect to the solar nominal effective temperature of 5,772 K: $$\sqrt{\biggl(\frac{5,772}{10,029}\biggr)^4 \cdot 10^{-2.8207}} = 0.0129\ R_\odot.$$) R_{☉}
Luminosity	0.015 L_{☉}
Surface gravity (log g)	7.969±0.006 cgs
Temperature	10029±41 K
Age	1.6+0.6 −0.4 Gyr

Component B
Mass	7±1 M_{Jup}
Radius	1.08±0.02 R_{Jup}
Luminosity	10^{−6.75±0.02} L_{☉}
Surface gravity (log g)	4.2±0.1 cgs
Temperature	357±3 K
Metallicity	$\begin{smallmatrix}\left[\ce{M}/\ce{H}\right]\end{smallmatrix}$ = −0.25±0.15
Age	1.6+0.6 −0.4 Gyr

Position (relative to A)
Component	B
Angular distance	130.2 ± 0.2″
Position angle	104.2 ± 0.2°
Projected separation	2500 AU

Other designations
- Maru, GJ 3483, BPM 4834, L 97-3, LAWD 27, LTT 3059, NLTT 19008, WD 0806-661, WD 0806−66, GSC 08936−01284, 2MASS J08065373−6618167, GEN# +6.00204834, uvby98 986097003, WG 12

Database references
SIMBAD	data

WD 0806−661 (L 97-3, GJ 3483), formally named Maru, is a DQ white dwarf with an extremely cold Y-type substellar companion (designated "B"), located in the constellation Volans at 62.7 light-years (19.2 parsecs) from Earth. The companion was discovered in 2011, and is the only known Y-type companion to a star or stellar remnant. At the time of its discovery WD 0806-661 B had the largest actual (2500 AU) and apparent separation (more than 2 arcminutes) of any known planetary-mass object, as well as being the coldest directly imaged substellar object then known.

== WD 0806-661 B ==
Component WD 0806-661 B was discovered in 2011 with the Spitzer Space Telescope. Its discovery was announced in the paper Luhman et al., 2011. The secondary has a mass between 7 and 9 M_{J} and a temperature between 325 and 350 kelvins (52 and 77 °C; 125 and 170 °F). At the time of its discovery, WD 0806−661 B was the coldest "brown dwarf" that has ever been found. The object is too faint to acquire a spectrum even with the Hubble Space Telescope, however the spectral type of this object was estimated to be Y1 based on its detection in Hubble images at near-infrared wavelengths. The photometric colors of this object suggest that it is metal-poor. The metal-poor composition of the companion could explain the DQ spectral type of the primary white dwarf. Hydrogen-deficient AGB stars might evolve into DB white dwarfs and then into DQ white dwarfs as they cool down.

In August 2022, WD 0806-661 and its planetary-mass companion were included among 20 systems to be named by the third NameExoWorlds project. The approved names, proposed by a team from South Korea, were announced in June 2023. WD 0806-661 and its companion are named after the Korean words Maru (마루) and Ahra (아라).

== See also ==
- List of exoplanets and planetary debris around white dwarfs
- WISE 0146+4234 – a Y0 companion to a T9 brown dwarf
- WISE 1217+1626 B – another Y0 companion to a T9 brown dwarf
- DT Virginis
- HD 106906 b
- GU Piscium b
