= WISE 0350−5658 =

Brown dwarf in the constellation Reticulum

WISE J035000.32−565830.2
- Location of WISE 0350−5658 in the constellation Reticulum

Observation data Epoch J2000 Equinox ICRS
- Constellation: Reticulum
- Right ascension: 03^{h} 50^{m} 00.32^{s}
- Declination: −56° 58′ 30.2″

Characteristics
- Spectral type: Y1
- Apparent magnitude (J (MKO-NIR filter system)): >22.8
- Apparent magnitude (H (MKO-NIR filter system)): >21.5

Astrometry
Proper motion (μ)	RA: −208.7±1.0 mas/yr Dec.: −575.4±1.1 mas/yr
Parallax (π)	176.4±2.3 mas
Distance	18.5 ± 0.2 ly (5.67 ± 0.07 pc)

Details
Temperature	388±88 K

Other designations
- WISE J035000.32−565830.2, WISE 0350−5658

Database references
SIMBAD	data

WISE J035000.32−565830.2 (designation abbreviated to WISE 0350−5658) is a (sub-)brown dwarf of spectral class Y1, located in constellation Reticulum, the nearest known star/brown dwarf in this constellation. Being approximately 18.5 light-years from Earth, it is one of the Sun's nearest neighbors.

== Discovery ==
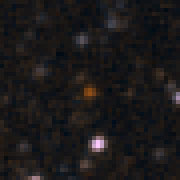
WISE 0350-5658 with unWISE

WISE 0350−5658 was discovered in 2012 by J. Davy Kirkpatrick and colleagues from data collected by the Wide-field Infrared Survey Explorer (WISE) in the infrared at a wavelength of 40 cm (16 in), whose mission lasted from December 2009 to February 2011. In 2012, Kirkpatrick et al. published a paper in The Astrophysical Journal, where they presented the discovery of seven new brown dwarfs of spectral type Y that had been found by WISE, among which was WISE 0350−5658.

== Distance ==
WISE 0350−5658 is one of the nearest known brown dwarfs: its trigonometric parallax is 0.184 ± 0.010 arcsecond, corresponding to a direct distance of 5.4 pc (17.7 ly).

== Physical properties ==
WISE 0350−5658 was observed together with WISEP J1738+2732 with the Gemini Observatory. The researchers found that non-equilibrium chemistry models reproduce the spectra of these two brown dwarfs better than equilibrium models. The researchers also found an effective temperature of 350±25 K and surface gravity of log g=4.0±0.25 for WISE 0350−5658. A mass of 7−9 M_{J} was estimated in this work. Later work using the Spitzer Space Telescope and J-band photometry found that WISE 0350−5658 has a low tangential velocity, could be metal-rich and also found a similar mass of 3−8 M_{J}. These properties could be an indicator that it is a young Y-dwarf, and might be a rogue planet. Another work using Hubble found a slightly higher mass of 7−13 M_{J}.

== See also ==
- List of nearest stars and brown dwarfs
- List of Y-dwarfs

The other six discoveries of brown dwarfs, published in Kirkpatrick et al. (2012):

- WISE 0146+4234 (Y0)
- WISE 0359−5401 (Y0)
- WISE 0535−7500 (≥Y1)
- WISE 0713−2917 (Y0)
- WISE 0734−7157 (Y0)
- WISE 2220−3628 (Y0)
