= WISE J1206+8401 =

Brown dwarf in the constellation Camelopardalis

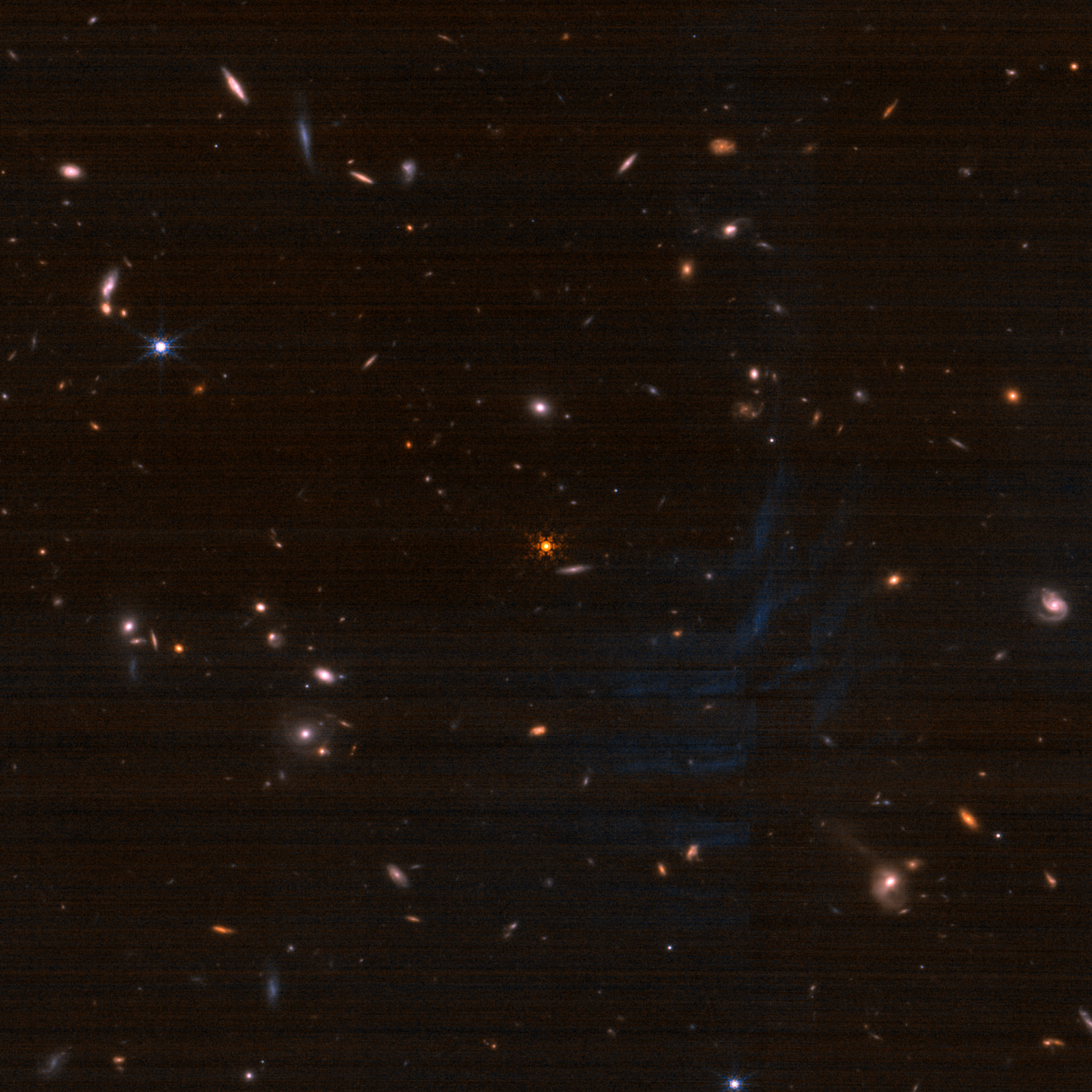
- WISE J1206+8401 with NIRCam (faint orange "star" in the center), the blue extended region on the lower-right is detector noise

Observation data Epoch J2000 Equinox J2000
- Constellation: Camelopardalis
- Right ascension: 12^{h} 06^{m} 08.19^{s}
- Declination: +84° 01′ 13.10″

Characteristics
- Evolutionary stage: brown dwarf
- Spectral type: Y0

Astrometry
Proper motion (μ)	RA: −577.5±1.0 mas/yr Dec.: −263.1±0.8 mas/yr
Parallax (π)	84.7±2.1 mas
Distance	38.5 ± 1.0 ly (11.8 ± 0.3 pc)

Details
Mass	18+2 −3 M_{Jup}
Radius	1.07±0.02 R_{Jup}
Luminosity (bolometric)	10^{−6.298 ± 0.023} L_{☉}
Surface gravity (log g)	4.60±0.06 cgs
Temperature	456±6 K
Metallicity	$\begin{smallmatrix}\left[\ce{M}/\ce{H}\right]\end{smallmatrix}$ = 0.32±0.02
Age	0.08 or 1.19 Gyr

Other designations
- CNS5 2967, WISEA J120604.25+840110.5, WISE J120604.38+840110.6

Database references
SIMBAD	data

WISE J1206+8401 (WISE J120604.38+840110.6, WISE 1206+8401) is a brown dwarf, discovered in 2015 with WISE and the Hubble Space Telescope. It has the spectral type Y0.

The object was found to be metal-rich in a work from 2017 and the research team found a mass of 6−14 M_{J}. A later work from 2023 found a mass of 17±5 jupiter mass. A 2024 study observed it with JWST, using NIRSpec and MIRI spectroscopy, which concluded a mass of either 1.9 or 11.2 M_{J} and corresponding ages of either 80 Myr or 1.19 Gyr, using two different models.

In Beiler et al. (2024), the object is not discussed in detail, but the researchers report the detection of molecular absorption features in their sample, including water vapor, methane, ammonia, carbon monoxide and carbon dioxide. None of their objects have any detection of phosphine. One paper mentions that WISE J1206+8401 does have deeper carbon dioxide and carbon monoxide features, when compared to other Y-dwarfs. This makes this Y-dwarf similar to CWISEP J1047+5457.

A 2026 study found a mass of 18+2
−3 M_{J} based on atmospherical retrievals of the brown dwarf's spectral energy distribution. The retrieved temperature and surface gravity are consistent with an age somewhat over two Gyr.

== See also ==
- List of Y-dwarfs
