= CFBDSIR J145829+101343 =

Binary star system

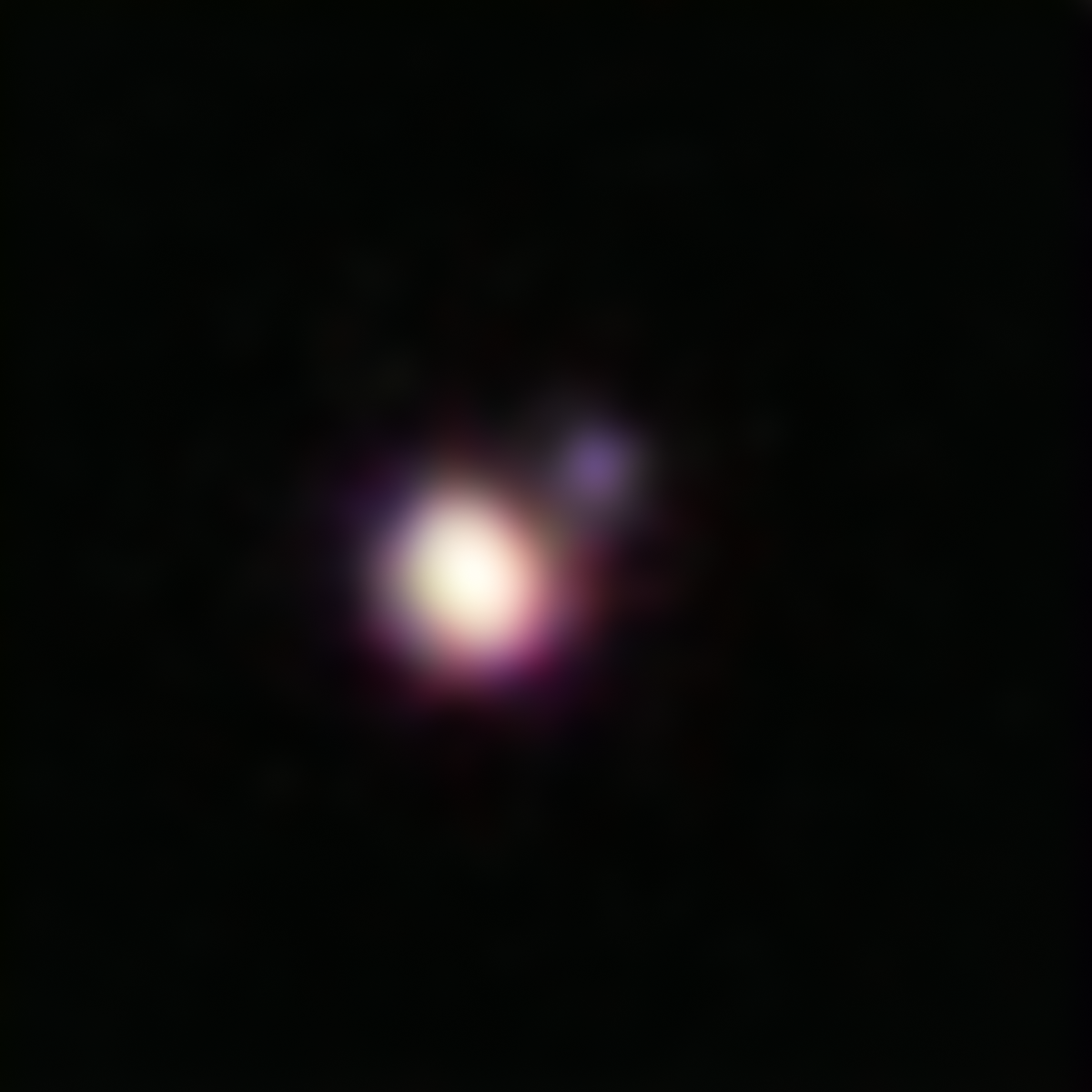
- CFBDSIR 1458+10

Observation data Epoch J2000 Equinox J2000
- Constellation: Boötes
- Right ascension: 14^{h} 58^{m} 29.0^{s}
- Declination: +10° 13′ 43″

Characteristics

Whole system (MKO filter system)
- Apparent magnitude (Y): 20.58 ± 0.21
- Apparent magnitude (J): 19.67 ± 0.02
- Apparent magnitude (H): 20.06 ± 0.10
- Apparent magnitude (K): 20.50 ± 0.24

Component A (MKO filter system)
- Spectral type: T9
- Apparent magnitude (Y): 20.81 ± 0.21
- Apparent magnitude (J): 19.83 ± 0.02
- Apparent magnitude (H): 20.18 ± 0.10
- Apparent magnitude (K): 20.63 ± 0.24

Component B (MKO filter system)
- Spectral type: Y0V
- Apparent magnitude (Y): 22.36 ± 0.24
- Apparent magnitude (J): 21.85 ± 0.06
- Apparent magnitude (H): 22.51 ± 0.16
- Apparent magnitude (K): 22.83 ± 0.30

Astrometry
Proper motion (μ)	RA: 174.0 ± 2.0 mas/yr Dec.: −381.8 ± 2.7 mas/yr
Parallax (π)	31.3±2.5 mas
Distance	104 ± 8 ly (32 ± 3 pc)

Orbit
Primary	A
Name	B
Period (P)	20^{+17}_{−6}—35^{+28}_{−10} yr

Details

Component A
Mass	(11.1 ± 0.7)—(36 ± 4) M_{Jup}
Radius	0.15 R_{☉}
Luminosity (bolometric)	10^{−5.72 ± 0.13} L_{☉}
Surface gravity (log g)	(4.37 ± 0.03)—(5.06 ± 0.07) cgs
Temperature	(479 ± 20)—(605 ± 55) K

Component B
Mass	6–15 M_{Jup}
Radius	0.13 R_{☉}
Luminosity (bolometric)	10^{−6.53 ± 0.13} L_{☉}
Surface gravity (log g)	(4.10 ± 0.10)—(4.69 ± 0.03) cgs
Temperature	370 ± 40 K

Position (relative to A)
Component	B
Epoch of observation	UT 2012 April 13
Angular distance	127.2 ± 1.4 mas
Position angle	318.1 ± 1.1°
Projected separation	4.06 AU

Other designations
- CFBDSIR J1458+1013; CFBDS 1458; CFBDS J145829+101343; WISEPA J145829.35+101341.8; WISE J145829.40+101341.7

Database references
SIMBAD	data

CFBDSIR J145829+101343 (designation abbreviated to CFBDSIR 1458+10, or CFBDSIR J1458+1013) is a binary system of two brown dwarfs of spectral classes T9 + Y0 orbiting each other, located in constellation Boötes about 104 light-years away from Earth.

The smaller companion, CFBDSIR 1458+10B, has a surface temperature of approx 370 K (≈100 °C). It used to be known as the coolest known brown dwarf until the discovery of WISE 1828+2650 in August 2011.

== Discovery ==
CFBDSIR 1458+10 A was discovered in 2010 by Delorme et al. from the Canada-France Brown Dwarf Survey using the facilities MegaCam and WIRCam mounted on the 3.6 m Canada-France-Hawaii Telescope, located on Mauna Kea Observatory, Hawaii. Image in z` band was taken on 2004 July 15 with MegaCam, and image in J band was taken on 2007 April 1 with WIRCam. In 2009 they made follow-up photometry, using the SOFI near infrared camera at the ESO 3.5 m New Technology Telescope (NTT) at the La Silla Observatory, Chile. In 2010 Delorme et al. published a paper in Astronomy and Astrophysics where they reported the identification of 55 T-dwarfs candidates, six of which were photometrically confirmed as T-dwarfs, including 3 ultracool brown dwarfs (later than T7 dwarfs and possible Y dwarfs), including CFBDSIR 1458+10. (Note: The other two ultracool brown dwarfs are CFBDSIR221903.07+002417.92 and CFBDSIR221505.06+003053.11. Three earlier type confirmed T dwarfs, as well as 49 unconfirmed candidates, are not listed in the article. (However, it is mentioned that two of three earlier type confirmed T dwarfs are re-identifications of already spectroscopically confirmed CFBDS brown dwarfs).)

=== Discovery of B ===
CFBDSIR 1458+10 B was discovered in 2011 by Liu et al. with laser guide star (LGS) adaptive optics (AO) system of the 10 m Keck II Telescope on Mauna Kea, Hawaii, using infra-red camera NIRC2 (the observations were made on 2010 May 22 and 2010 July 8 (UT)). In 2011 Liu et al. published a paper in The Astrophysical Journal where they presented discovery of CFBDSIR 1458+10 system component B (the only discovery presented in the article). Also they presented a near-infrared (J-band) trigonometric parallax of the system, measured using WIRCam on the Canada-France-Hawaii Telescope (CFHT), Mauna Kea, in seven epochs during the 2009–2010; and spectroscopy with the X-Shooter spectrograph at the European Southern Observatory's Very Large Telescope (VLT) Unit Telescope 2 (UT2) in Chile (the observations have been performed from May 5 to July 9, 2010), that allowed to calculate the temperature (and other physical parameters) of the two brown dwarfs.

== 2012 Keck LGS-AO imaging ==
In 2012 CFBDSIR 1458+10 system was observed by Liu et al. with laser guide star (LGS) adaptive optics (AO) system of the 10 m Keck II Telescope on Mauna Kea, Hawaii, using infra-red camera NIRC2 (the observations were made on 2012 April 13 (UT)). In 2012 Liu et al. published a paper in The Astrophysical Journal where they presented results of observations with Keck II LGS-AO of three brown dwarf binary systems, binarity of the two of which was first presented in this paper, and binarity of the other one, CFBDSIR 1458+10, was known before.

== Distance ==
Trigonometric parallax of CFBDSIR 1458+10, measured under The Hawaii Infrared Parallax Program by Dupuy & Liu in 2012, is 31.3 ± 2.5 mas, corresponding to a distance 31.9^{+2.8}_{−2.4} pc, or 104.2^{+9.0}_{−7.7} ly.

CFBDSIR 1458+10 distance estimates

Source	Parallax, mas	Distance, pc	Distance, ly	Ref.
Delorme et al. (2010)		~23	~75	
Liu et al. (2011)	43.3 ± 4.5	23.1 ± 2.4	75.3 ± 7.8	
Dupuy & Liu (2012) (preprint version 1)	34.0 ± 2.6	29.4^{+2.4}_{−2.1}	95.9^{+7.9}_{−6.7}	
Dupuy & Liu (2012)	**31.3 ± 2.5**	**31.9^{+2.8}_{−2.4}**	**104.2^{+9.0}_{−7.7}**	

Non-trigonometric distance estimates are marked in italic. The best estimate is marked in bold.

== Space motion ==
CFBDSIR 1458+10 has proper motion of about 420 milliarcseconds per year.

CFBDSIR 1458+10 proper motion estimates

Source	μ, mas/yr	P. A., °	μ_{RA}, mas/yr	μ_{DEC}, mas/yr	Ref.
Delorme et al. (2010)	444 ± 16	157.5 ± 2.1	170 ± 16	−410 ± 16	
Liu et al. (2011)	432 ± 6	154.2 ± 0.7	188	−389	
Dupuy & Liu (2012) (preprint version 1)	418.1 ± 3.2	155.4 ± 0.4	174.3 ± 3.0	−380.0 ± 3.2	
Dupuy & Liu (2012)	**419.6 ± 2.6**	**155.50 ± 0.28**	**174.0 ± 2.0**	**−381.8 ± 2.7**	

The most accurate estimates are marked in bold.

== Physical properties ==
Using three models, Liu et al. calculated physical properties of CFBDSIR 1458+10 components.

From Lyon/COND models and L_{bol}:

Component and assumed age	Mass, M_{Jup}	T_{eff}, K	log g, cm/s^{2}	P, yr
**A** (for 1 Gyr)	12.1 ± 1.9	556 ± 48	4.45 ± 0.07	
**B** (for 1 Gyr)	5.8 ± 1.3	360 ± 40	4.10 ± 0.10	35^{+28}_{−10}
**A** (for 5 Gyr)	31 ± 4	605 ± 55	5.00 ± 0.08	
**B** (for 5 Gyr)	14 ± 3	380 ± 50	4.58 ± 0.11	22^{+18}_{−6}

From Burrows et al. (1997) models and L_{bol}):

Component and assumed age	Mass, M_{Jup}	T_{eff}, K	log g, cm/s^{2}	P, yr
**A** (for 1 Gyr)	13 ± 2	550 ± 50	4.47 ± 0.07	
**B** (for 1 Gyr)	6.8 ± 1.5	350 ± 40	4.14 ± 0.10	33^{+27}_{−7}
**A** (for 5 Gyr)	36 ± 4	600 ± 60	5.06 ± 0.07	
**B** (for 5 Gyr)	17 ± 4	380 ± 50	4.65 ± 0.12	20^{+17}_{−6}

From Burrows et al. (2003) models and M(J):

Component and assumed age	Mass, M_{Jup}	T_{eff}, K	log g, cm/s^{2}	P, yr
**A** (for 1 Gyr)	11.1 ± 0.7	479 ± 20	4.37 ± 0.03	
**B** (for 1 Gyr)	7.6 ± 0.6	386 ± 15	4.19 ± 0.04	34^{+28}_{−10}
**A** (for 5 Gyr)	>25	>483	>4.85	
**B** (for 5 Gyr)	18.8 ± 1.3	407 ± 15	4.69 ± 0.03	<22

The adopted surface temperature of B is 370 ± 40 K, and adopted mass is 6-15 M_{Jup}.

=== Luminosity ===
At the time of its discovery, CFBDSIR 1458+10 B was the least luminous brown dwarf known.

CFBDSIR 1458+10 bolometric luminosity estimates

Source	L_{bol}/link-y L_{☉} (A)	L_{bol}/L_{☉} (B)	Ref.
Liu et al. (2011)	10^{−6.02 ± 0.14} ((1.1 ± 0.4) × 10^{−6})	10^{−6.74 ± 0.19} ((2.0 ± 0.9) × 10^{−7})	
Liu et al. (2012)	10^{−5.72 ± 0.13}	10^{−6.53 ± 0.13}	

== B's spectral class ==
In Liu et al. (2011) CFBDSIR 1458+10 B was assigned to the spectral class >T10, it was proposed that CFBDSIR 1458+10 B may be a member of the Y spectral class of brown dwarfs. In 2012 Liu et al. assigned it a spectral class Y0.

== Water clouds ==
Due to the low surface temperature for a brown dwarf, CFBDSIR 1458+10 B may be able to form water clouds in its upper atmosphere.

== See also ==
- WISE J0336−0143 – first Y + Y binary brown dwarf system discovered

The other two brown dwarf binary systems, observed by Liu et al. with Keck II LGS-AO in 2012:

- WISE 1217+1626 (T9 + Y0, binarity was newly discovered)
- WISE 1711+3500 (T8 + T9.5, binarity was newly discovered)
