= WISE J0336−0143 =

Binary brown dwarf system in the constellation Eridanus

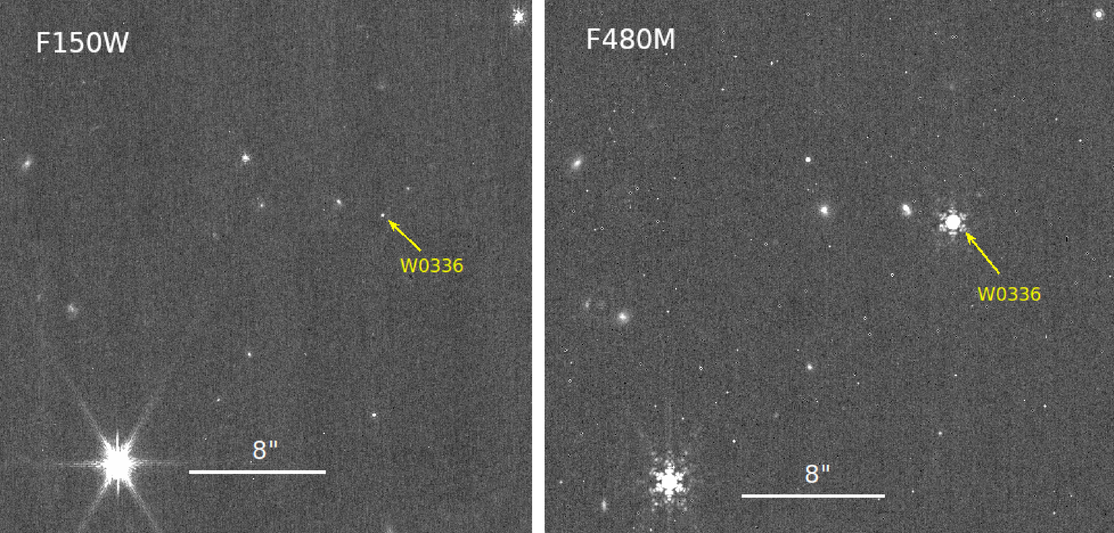
- WISE J0336−0143 imaged by the James Webb Space Telescope's NIRCam in two different filters

Observation data Epoch J2000 Equinox ICRS
- Constellation: Eridanus
- Right ascension: 03^{h} 36^{m} 05.052^{s}
- Declination: −01° 43′ 50.48″

Characteristics
- Spectral type: Y + Y Y0 (effective)
- Apparent magnitude (J): 21.26±0.14
- Apparent magnitude (H): 21.59±0.31
- Apparent magnitude (K): 21.8±0.5 (est.)
- Apparent magnitude (W1): 18.164±0.153
- Apparent magnitude (W2): 14.664±0.023

Astrometry
Proper motion (μ)	RA: −251.5±0.9 mas/yr Dec.: −1,216.1±0.93 mas/yr
Parallax (π)	99.8±2.1 mas
Distance	32.7 ± 0.7 ly (10.0 ± 0.2 pc)

Details

A
Mass	8.5–18 M_{Jup}
Temperature	415±20 K

B
Mass	5–11.5 M_{Jup}
Temperature	325+15 −10 K

Orbit
Primary	A
Secondary	B
Period (P)	7±2 yr
Semi-major axis (a)	0.97+0.05 −0.09 AU (mean separation)

Other designations
- WISEA J033605.04−014351.0, CWISE J033604.94−014358.5

Database references
SIMBAD	data

WISE J033605.05−014350.4, abbreviated to WISE J0336−0143 or W0336, is a binary system comprising two planetary-mass Y-type brown dwarfs tightly orbiting around their common center of mass. The system is located in the constellation Eridanus, about 33 light-years (10 parsecs) away from the Sun. It was discovered in images taken by the Wide-field Infrared Survey Explorer (WISE) and formally published by Gregory N. Mace and collaborators in March 2013. Astronomers suspected the brown dwarf was a binary system upon follow-up observations showing it had an unusual infrared spectrum, but its binarity was not confirmed until the James Webb Space Telescope resolved the system's components in high-resolution NIRCam imaging in September 2022, with its results published in March 2023.

The two components orbit their system barycenter approximately every 7 years and are separated 0.97 astronomical units from each other, which is slightly less than the distance between the Sun and Earth. The brighter primary component has a temperature of 415 K and a mass within the range of 8.5–18 Jupiter masses, while the fainter secondary component has a temperature of 325 K and a mass range of 5–11.5 Jupiter masses. Because the binary system's age and evolutionary stage have not been determined yet, the individual components' masses are uncertain. Nevertheless, both components appear to have masses near the deuterium fusion threshold of 13 Jupiter masses, which marks the boundary between gas giant planets and brown dwarfs. The study of such low-mass binary systems will provide valuable insight into the formation and evolution of planetary-mass objects.

The secondary component WISE J0336−0143 B (305–340 K) might be one of the coldest objects in interstellar space discovered so far (as of September 2023). Newer models of Y dwarfs produce an even colder temperature of 285–305 K for WISE J0336−0143 B. WISE 0855−0714 remains the coldest object found so far with 225–260 K and WISE J0830+2837 has a similar temperature with 300–350 K. Models suggest that WISE J0336−0143 B might have water clouds, but it is possible that changes in the pressure–temperature profile might instead explain the color of cold Y dwarfs. JWST photometry shows that WISE J0336−0143 B is significantly bluer than WISE 0855−0714. This blue color is seen as a likely indicator of water ice clouds.

== Image gallery ==
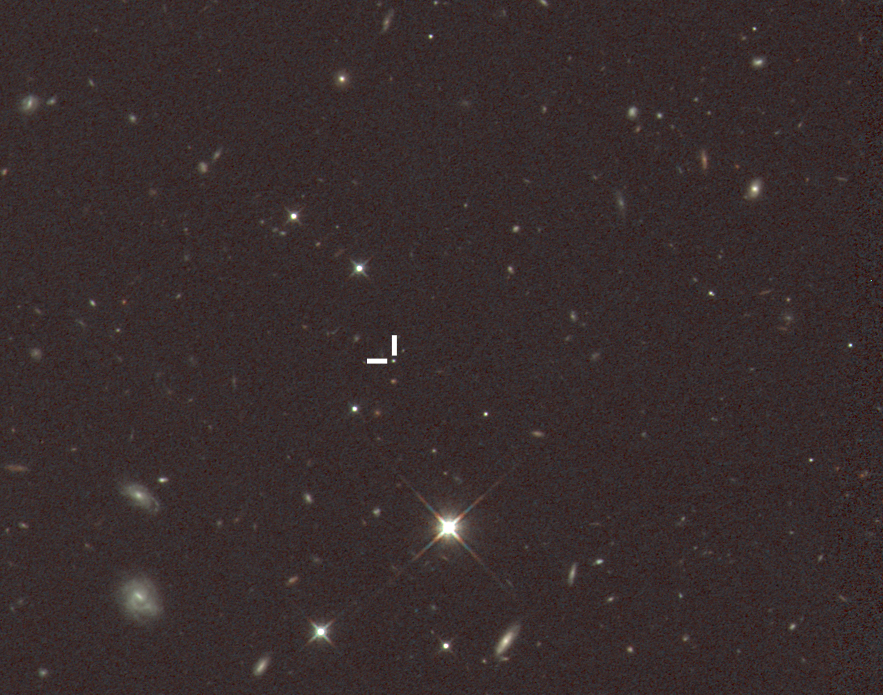
Hubble Space Telescope WFC3/near-infrared image of W0336 and the stars and galaxies in the field of view.

Movement of W0336 in the Hubble images between January 2021 and October 2021.

== See also ==
- CWISEP J1935−1546 – second Y+Y binary discovered
- CFBDSIR J145829+101343 – binary system of T9 + Y0 brown dwarfs
- WISE 1217+1626 – binary system of T9 + Y0 brown dwarfs
- WISE 1711+3500 – binary system of T8 + T9.5 brown dwarfs
- List of coolest stars
- List of star systems within 30–35 light-years
- List of Y-dwarfs
