= CWISEP J1446−2317 =

Brown dwarf in the constellation Libra

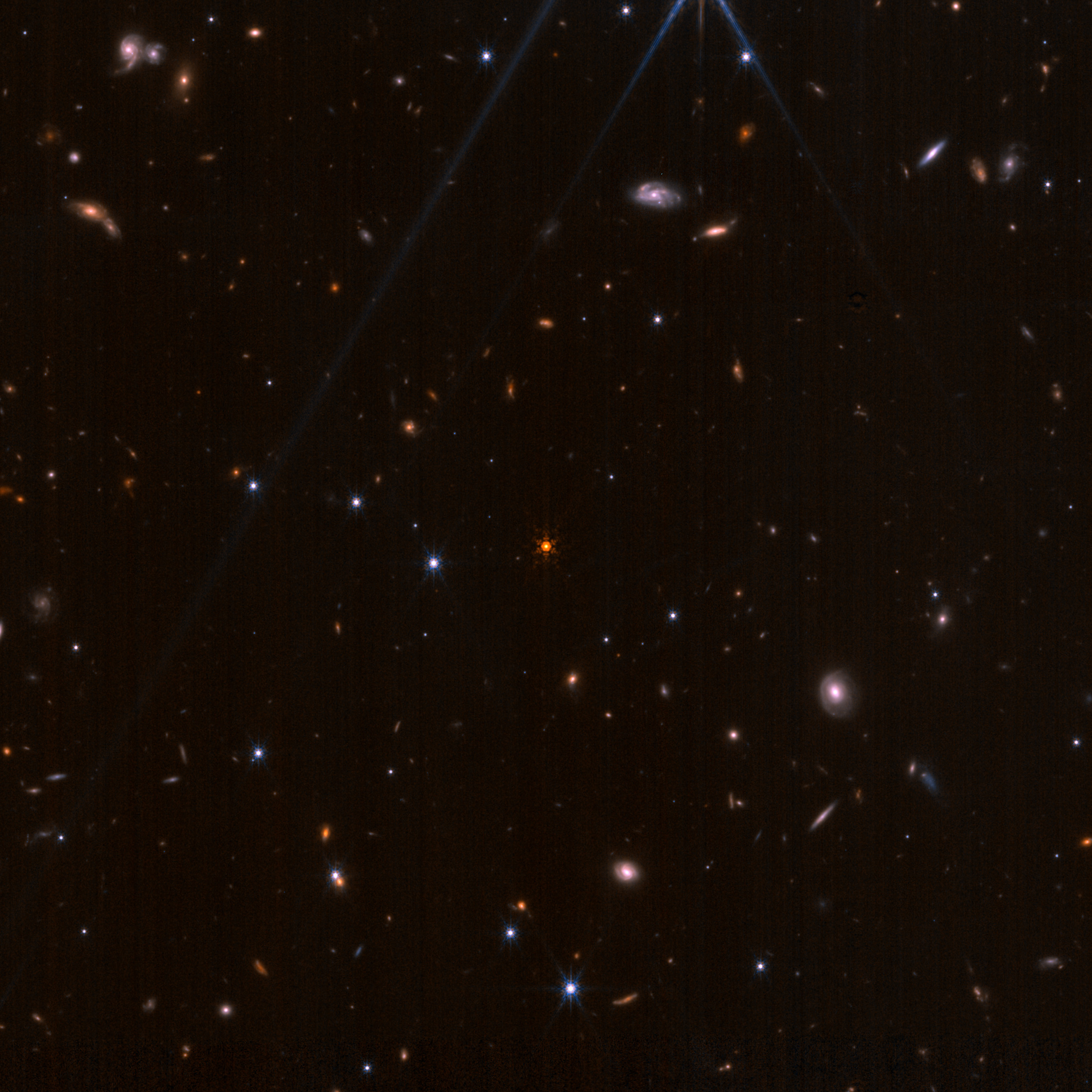
- JWST NIRCam image of CWISEP J1446−2317 (faint orange "star" at the center)

Observation data Epoch J2000 Equinox J2000
- Constellation: Libra
- Right ascension: 14^{h} 46^{m} 07.43^{s}
- Declination: −23° 17′ 04.33″

Characteristics
- Evolutionary stage: brown dwarf
- Spectral type: Y1

Astrometry
Proper motion (μ)	RA: -796.1 ±48.8 mas/yr Dec.: -913.0 ±24.3 mas/yr
Parallax (π)	103.8±5.0 mas
Distance	31 ± 2 ly (9.6 ± 0.5 pc)

Details
Mass	18±1 M_{Jup}
Radius	0.82±0.02 R_{Jup}
Luminosity (bolometric)	10^{−6.779 ± 0.043} L_{☉}
Surface gravity (log g)	4.81+0.03 −0.02 cgs
Temperature	375+4 −5 K
Age	10 Gyr

Other designations
- CWISE J144606.58-231719.0, CWISEP J144606.62-231717.8

Database references
SIMBAD	data

CWISEP J1446−2317 (CWISEP J144606.62−231717.8, CWISEP 1446−2317) is a brown dwarf. It is a Y-dwarf with a spectral type of Y1.

CWISEP J1446−2317 was discovered as an unusual red object (Spitzer ch1-ch2 = 3.71 ±0.44 mag) in the new combined WISE/NEOWISE catalog, called CatWISE. The object was found using supervised machine-learning, by using XGBoost. The temperature was estimated to be lower than 381 Kelvin for this object. Follow-up observations however revised the color to ch1-ch2 = 2.986 ±0.048 mag, making it the fifth reddest object at the time, with an estimated temperature of 310−360 K. The mass was estimated between 2 and 20 M_{J} for an age range of ~500 Myr–13 Gyr. The object is however unlikely to be young because of its high tangential velocity of around 60 km/s. If this object is similar to other ultracool dwarfs in the solar neighbourhood, it would have an age of about 1.5–6.5 Gyrs and therefore a mass of 4–14 M_{J} according to the authors.

In 2024 observations of CWISEP J1446−2317 with JWST were published. These observations were carried out with NIRSpec and MIRI spectroscopy. These observations established this object to have a spectral type of Y1, due to the narrow J-band peaks. There were however difficulties to precisely determine the spectral type. CWISEP J1446−2317 is not discussed in detail in this work. The authors however mention that they detect absorption features in their sample. These include water vapor, methane, ammonia, carbon monoxide and carbon dioxide. None of the objects in their sample show absorption due to phosphine, which is predicted to be present in the atmosphere of these cold objects.

== See also ==
- List of Y-dwarfs
