= WD 0806−661 B =

Sub-brown dwarf or exoplanet

WD 0806−661 b / Ahra
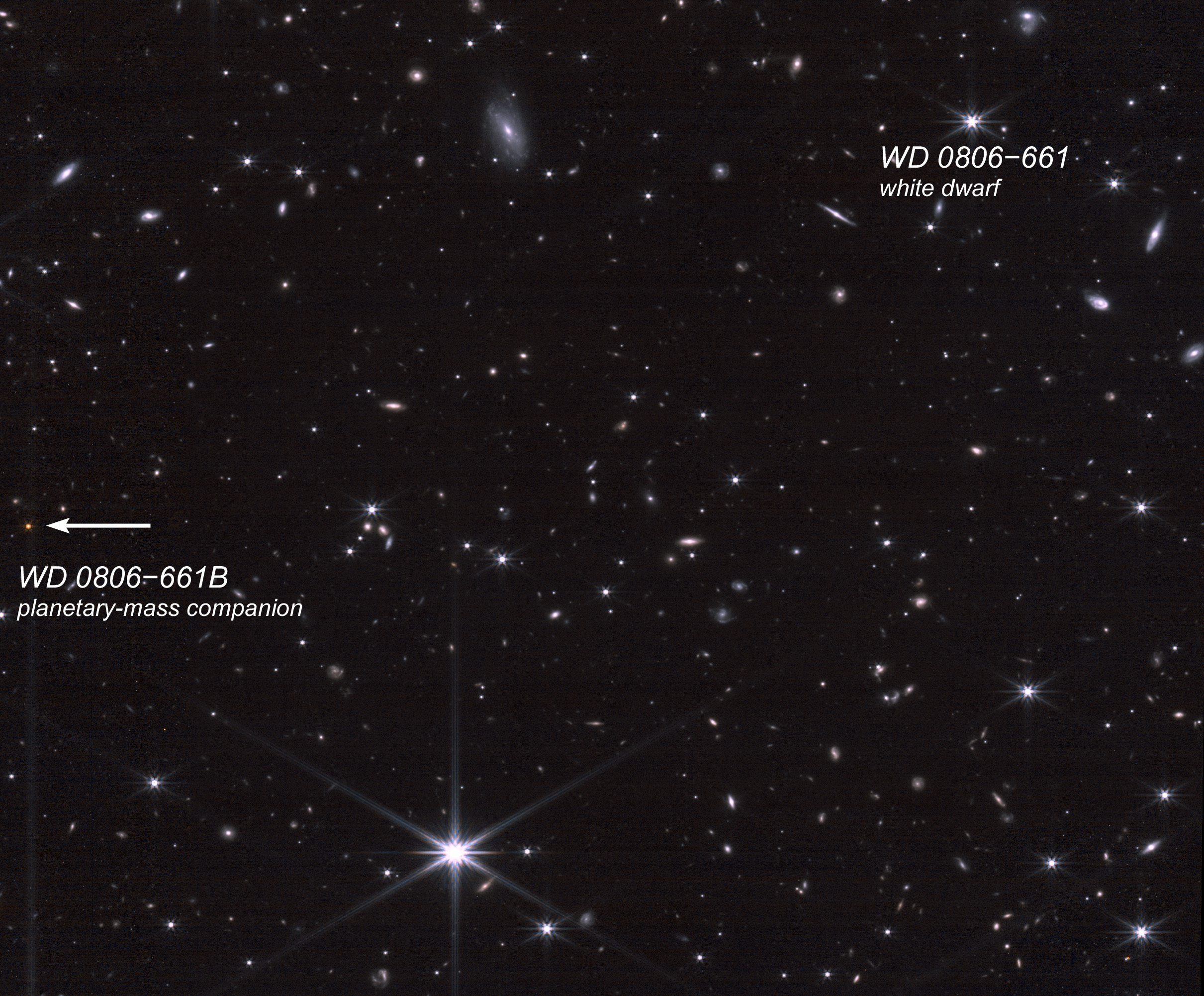
- JWST image of WD 0806−661 B and its white dwarf star

Discovery
- Discovered by: Luhman et al.
- Discovery date: 2011
- Detection method: Direct imaging

Designations
- Alternative names: Ahra, GJ 3483 B

Orbital characteristics
- Semi-major axis: 2,500 AU
- Star: WD 0806−661

Physical characteristics
- Mean radius: 1.08±0.02 R_{J}
- Mass: 7±1 M_{J}
- Surface gravity: 4.2±0.1 cgs
- Temperature: 357 ± 3 K (83.85 ± 3.00 °C; 182.93 ± 5.40 °F)

Atmosphere
- Composition by volume: H_{2}, He dominated, detected: H_{2}O, NH_{3}, CH_{4} CO, CO_{2}, H_{2}S

WD 0806−661 B or b, formally named Ahra, is a planetary-mass companion of the white dwarf star WD 0806−661, or Maru.

This object was discovered in 2011 by the Spitzer Space Telescope. It has a mass of between 7–9 M_{J}, putting it as a gas giant planet. At the time of its discovery, WD 0806−661 b was the coldest brown dwarf ever discovered, with a temperature in the range 325–350 Kelvin (52–77 °C or 125–170 °F) and also had the largest separation from its star at about 2,500 AU at the time of its discovery. The photometric colors of the object suggest it is metal-poor.

== Host star ==
WD 0806−661, or Maru, is a white dwarf star of the spectral type DQ. The metal-poor composition of its planetary-mass companion could explain its spectral type, as it is theorized that hydrogen-deficient stars of the asymptotic giant branch could evolve into white dwarfs of spectral type DB and then DQ as they cool down. WD 0806-661 is estimated to be 1.5−2.7 billion years old, and likely used to be an A-type main sequence star of 2.1 ± 0.3 solar masses before reaching the end of its life and becoming a white dwarf. WD 0806-661 B may have formed closer to the star, but migrated further away as it reached the end of its life.

== Characteristics ==
Because it orbits very far away from its star, WD 0806−661 B is likely very dark, receiving almost no light from its star. However, due to the object's high mass, internal heat keeps the temperature hotter than that of Earth. The object's radius is estimated to be 12% larger than that of Jupiter, and is likely the same age as the star. Despite having temperatures comparable to that of Earth, WD 0806−661 B is a poor candidate for extraterrestrial life due to high surface gravity and lack of starlight. Because of its large mass and distance from its star, WD 0806−661 B could host many large exomoons.

WD 0806−661 B was observed by the Mid-Infrared Instrument (MIRI) aboard the James Webb Space Telescope, which probed its atmosphere with medium-resolution data. The results were published in 2025. The MIRI spectrum is dominated by absorption of water vapor, ammonia and methane. Carbon monoxide and carbon dioxide were not detected, and only upper limits of their abundance can be determined. The atmosphere of WD 0806−661 B is mostly consistent with theoretical models, but some results are at odds with the model predictions, such as the non-detection of water clouds and the mixing ratio of ammonia. The retrieved mass is smaller than expected, possibly hinting at a younger age or an incorrect retrieved mass. Additional data was taken with the NIRCam and NIRSpec instruments of JWST, and published in 2026. The study found that vertical mixing decreased with higher altitude. This is based on the measured abundance of carbon monoxide and ammonia, which are present at 47 bars and carbon dioxide, which is present at lower pressures of 22 bars (or higher altitudes). The study also measured the abundance of water, hydrogen sulfide and methane. Based on the retrieval, the researchers found an elevated carbon/oxygen ratio, sub-solar metallicity and nearly solar carbon/sulfur ratio in the atmosphere.

=== Type of object ===
There is no consensus as to whether WD 0806-661 b should be considered an exoplanet or a sub-brown dwarf. Based on its large distance from the white dwarf, this object likely formed like a star rather than in a protoplanetary disk, and it is generally described as a brown dwarf in the scientific literature. However, the IAU considers objects below the ~13 M_{J} limiting mass for deuterium fusion that orbit stars (or stellar remnants), with M_{2}/M_{1} (Note: Mass ratio between planet (M_{2}) and host star (M_{1})) < 1/25 to be planets, no matter how they formed. Additionally, WD 0806-661 b has been named Ahra through the IAU's NameExoWorlds exoplanet naming campaign, and is included in databases such as the NASA Exoplanet Archive.

== See also ==
- WD 0806−661
- COCONUTS-2b − Another planetary-mass companion with a large separation from its star
- List of Y-dwarfs
- 2MASS J2126−8140
