= CWISEP J1047+5457 =

Brown dwarf in the constellation Ursa Major

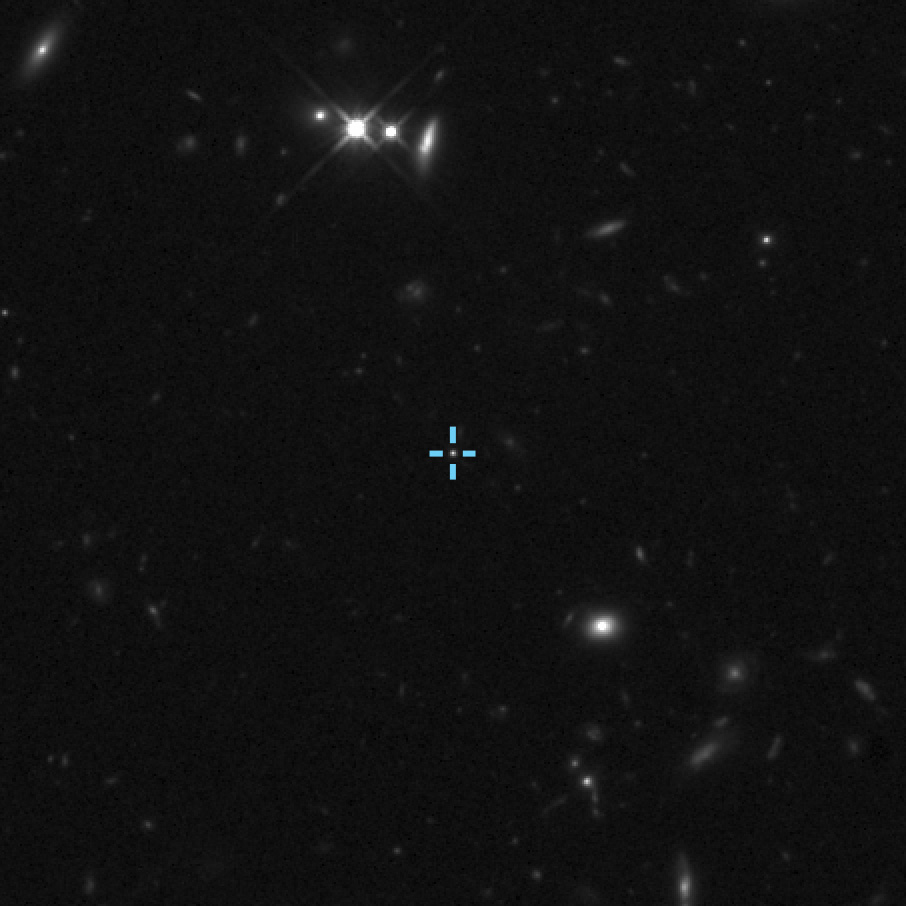
- Hubble WFC3 image of CWISEP J1047+5457 (blue cross-hair)

Observation data Epoch J2000 Equinox J2000
- Constellation: Ursa Major
- Right ascension: 10^{h} 47^{m} 57.50^{s}
- Declination: +54° 57′ 42.17″

Characteristics
- Evolutionary stage: brown dwarf
- Spectral type: Y1

Astrometry
Proper motion (μ)	RA: –447.9 ±41.7 mas/yr Dec.: –65.5 ±35.2 mas/yr
Parallax (π)	68.1±4.9 mas
Distance	48 ± 3 ly (15 ± 1 pc)

Details
Mass	41±1 M_{Jup}
Radius	0.88±0.01 R_{Jup}
Luminosity (bolometric)	10^{−6.582 ± 0.063} L_{☉}
Temperature	415±3 K
Metallicity	$\begin{smallmatrix}\left[\ce{M}/\ce{H}\right]\end{smallmatrix}$ = 0.68±0.01
Age	>10 Gyr

Other designations
- CWISEP J104756.81+545741.6

Database references
SIMBAD	data

CWISEP J1047+5457 (CWISEP J104756.81+545741.6, CWISEP J1047+54) is a Y-dwarf discovered in 2020.

CWISEP J1047+5457 was discovered in 2020 from a preliminary CatWISE catalog, initially determined to have a spectral type of Y0. Follow-up observations with JWST spectroscopy (NIRSpec and MIRI) showed that it had a spectral type of Y1. The observations showed that it had unusually strong carbon monoxide and carbon dioxide absorption. This causes the Spitzer ch1-ch2 color to be extremely blue (2.47 ±0.19 mag) for its spectral type and explains the misidentification as a Y0 in the discovery paper. The strong absorption might be explained with extreme disequilibrium chemistry, low surface gravity, or a low carbon to oxygen ratio. Other molecules, such as water vapor, methane and ammonia are also detected in the spectra. Phosphine is not detected.

Another study suspects this object to be young and low mass. The researchers found that increased amount of CO and CO_{2} can be explained with a low gravity. A low gravity is commonly associated with a young age for brown dwarfs. The researchers estimated a mass of less than 3 M_{J} for an age of 200 Myr. The researchers also found a 52% likelihood that it belongs to the 40 Myr old Argus association, which would lower the mass to around 1 M_{J}. However, atmospherical retrievals derive a mass of 41±1 M_{J} and radius of 0.88±0.01 R_{J} which, when compared to predictions of evolutionary models, imply an age of over 10 billion years.

== See also ==
- List of Y-dwarfs
- CWISE J1055+5443 is another Y-dwarf with blue ch1-ch2 color, here this is explained with a young age
- List of star systems within 45–50 light-years
