= WISE 1217+1626 =

Star in the constellation Coma Berenices

WISEPC J121756.91+162640.2
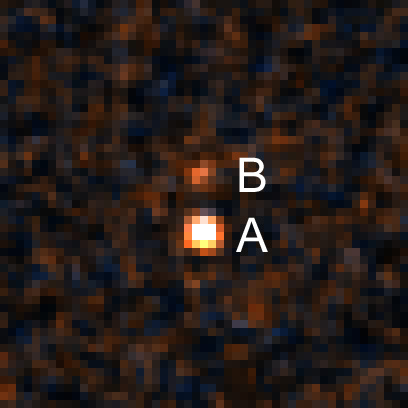
- WISE 1217+1626 with the T9 labelled as A and the Y0 labelled as B Credit: NASA/ESA Hubble; Jenny Patience et al. (Processing: Meli_thev)

Observation data Epoch MJD 55549.01 Equinox J2000
- Constellation: Coma Berenices
- Right ascension: 12^{h} 17^{m} 56.96^{s}
- Declination: +16° 26′ 40.0″

Characteristics

Whole system
- Apparent magnitude (Y (MKO): 18.38±0.04
- Apparent magnitude (J (2MASS): >18.52
- Apparent magnitude (J (MKO): 17.83±0.02
- Apparent magnitude (H (2MASS): >17.50
- Apparent magnitude (H (MKO): 18.18±0.05
- Apparent magnitude (K_{S} (2MASS): >16.64
- Apparent magnitude (K (MKO): 18.80±0.04

Component A
- Spectral type: T8.5
- Apparent magnitude (Y (MKO): 18.59±0.04
- Apparent magnitude (J (MKO): 17.98±0.02
- Apparent magnitude (H (MKO): 18.31±0.05
- Apparent magnitude (K (MKO): 18.94±0.04

Component B
- Spectral type: Y0-0.5
- Apparent magnitude (Y (MKO): 20.26±0.04
- Apparent magnitude (J (MKO): 20.08±0.03
- Apparent magnitude (H (MKO): 20.51±0.06
- Apparent magnitude (K (MKO): 21.10±0.12

Astrometry
Proper motion (μ)	RA: 754.9±1.2 mas/yr Dec.: −1249.8±1.8 mas/yr
Parallax (π)	107.4±3.5 mas
Distance	30.4 ± 1.0 ly (9.3 ± 0.3 pc)

Orbit
Primary	A
Name	B
Period (P)	130^{+230}_{−30} yr

Details

Component A
Mass	30 M_{Jup}
Luminosity (bolometric)	10^{−5.95 ± 0.18} L_{☉}
Surface gravity (log g)	5.07±0.05 cgs
Temperature	575±25 K
Age	6±2 Gyr

Component B
Mass	22 M_{Jup}
Luminosity (bolometric)	10^{−6.79 ± 0.18} L_{☉}
Surface gravity (log g)	4.77±0.05 cgs
Temperature	450±50 K

Position (relative to A)
Component	B
Epoch of observation	UT 2012 January 29
Angular distance	758.2±1.4 mas
Position angle	14.50±0.13°
Projected separation	~ 8 AU

Other designations
- WISEPC J121756.91+162640.2; WISE J1217+1626; WISE 1217+1626; WISE J1217+1626AB, WISE J121756.90+162640.8

Database references
SIMBAD	data
Exoplanet Archive	data

WISEPC J121756.91+162640.2 (designation abbreviated to WISE 1217+1626, or WISE J1217+1626) is a binary brown dwarf system of spectral classes T9 + Y0, located in constellation Coma Berenices at approximately 30.4 light-years from Earth.

== History of observations ==
=== Discovery ===
WISE 1217+1626 A was discovered in 2011 by J. Davy Kirkpatrick et al. from data, collected by Wide-field Infrared Survey Explorer (WISE) Earth-orbiting satellite—NASA infrared-wavelength 40 cm (16 in) space telescope, which mission lasted from December 2009 to February 2011. In 2011 Kirkpatrick et al. published a paper in The Astrophysical Journal Supplement, where they presented discovery of 98 new found by WISE brown dwarf systems with components of spectral types M, L, T and Y, among which also was WISE 1217+1626. (Note: These 98 brown dwarf systems are only among first, not all brown dwarf systems, discovered from data, collected by WISE: six discoveries were published earlier (however, also listed in Kirkpatrick et al. (2011)) in Mainzer et al. (2011) and Burgasser et al. (2011), and the other discoveries were published later.)

=== Initial estimate of spectral type ===
Initial estimate of WISE 1217+1626' spectral type (before discovery of its binarity) was T9 (the same as the component's A type estimate made after this discovery).

=== Discovery of component B ===
WISE 1217+1626 B was discovered in 2012 by Liu et al. with laser guide star (LGS) adaptive optics (AO) system of the 10-m Keck II Telescope on Mauna Kea, Hawaii, using infrared camera NIRC2 (the observations were made on 2012 January 29 (UT)). On 2012 April 1 (UT) Liu et al. observed WISE J1217+1626AB using the near-IR camera NIRI on the Gemini-North 8.1-m telescope on Mauna Kea, Hawaii and the binary was marginally resolved. On 12 April 2012 (UT) they obtained resolved spectroscopy of WISE J1217+1626AB with the near-IR spectrograph NIRSPEC again on the Keck II Telescope. In 2012 Liu et al. published a paper in The Astrophysical Journal where they presented results of observations with Keck II LGS-AO of three brown dwarf binary systems, binarity of one of which was known before, and binarity of the other two, including WISE 1217+1626, was first presented in this paper.

== Physical properties ==
Using three models, Liu et al. calculated physical properties of WISE 1217+1626 components for ages of 1 and 5 billion years. Later, models corresponding to age of the system equal to 1 billion years, were found to be poorly fitting and were discarded.

From Burrows et al. (2003) models and M(J):

Component and assumed age	Mass, M_{Jup}	T_{eff}, K	log g, cm/s^{2}	P, yr
A (for 5 Gyr)	29±3	530±30	4.95±0.05	
B (for 5 Gyr)	18.4±1.0	402±11	4.68±0.03	130+230 −30

From Lyon/COND models and M(J):

Component and assumed age	Mass, M_{Jup}	T_{eff}, K	log g, cm/s^{2}	P, yr
A (for 5 Gyr)	8.3±0.9	660±40	5.07±0.05	
B (for 5 Gyr)	20±2	470±30	4.77±0.05	120+220 −30

From Lyon/COND models and L_{bol}:

Component and assumed age	Mass, M_{Jup}	T_{eff}, K	log g, cm/s^{2}	P, yr
A (for 5 Gyr)	33±5	630±70	5.04±0.09	
B (for 5 Gyr)	13±3	370±50	4.54±0.11	130+240 −30

Both components have a thin cloud layers in atmosphere. Despite being cold enough to have a chloride and sulfide clouds in atmosphere, component B atmosphere is not as cloudy as expected, possibly because of the system been metal-poor.

== See also ==
- WISE J0336−0143 – first Y + Y binary brown dwarf system discovered

The other two brown dwarf binary systems, observed by Liu et al. with Keck II LGS-AO in 2012:

- WISE 1711+3500 (T8 + T9.5, binarity was newly discovered)
- CFBDSIR 1458+10 (T9 + Y0, binarity was known before)

Lists:

- List of star systems within 30–35 light-years
- List of Y-dwarfs
