= WISE 0146+4234 =

Binary brown dwarf star in the constellation Andromeda

WISE J014656.66+423410.0
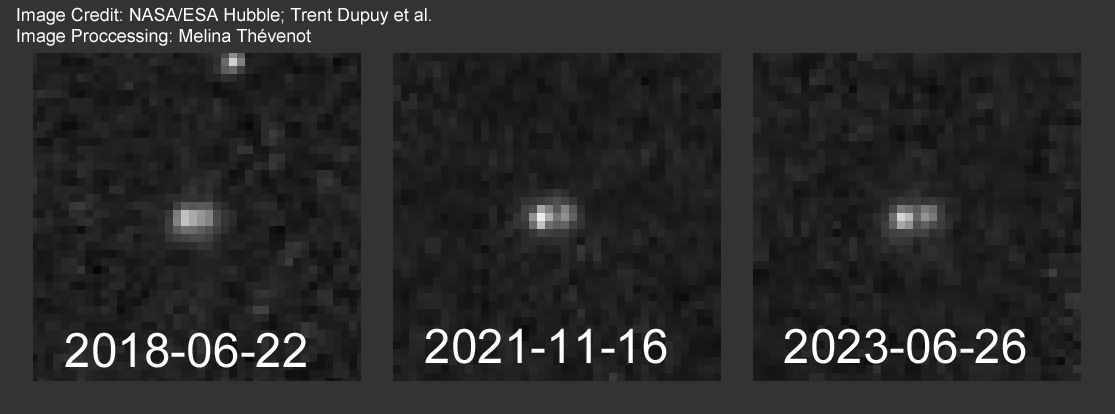
- Hubble images of WISE 0146+4234 AB over three epochs, showing the increasing separation of the pair

Observation data Epoch J2000 Equinox ICRS
- Constellation: Andromeda
- Right ascension: 01^{h} 46^{m} 57.111^{s}
- Declination: +42° 34′ 10.34″

Characteristics
- Spectral type: T9/Y0
- Apparent magnitude (H): 18.71±0.24

Astrometry
Proper motion (μ)	RA: −451.6±0.9 mas/yr Dec.: −33.1±0.9 mas/yr
Parallax (π)	51.7±2.0 mas
Distance	63 ± 2 ly (19.3 ± 0.7 pc)

Position (relative to WISE 0146+4234A)
Component	WISE 0146+4234B
Angular distance	0.0875±0.0021″
Position angle	259.7±1.3°
Projected separation	1.69±0.106 AU

Details

WISE 0146+4234A
Mass	11±4 M_{Jup}
Radius	0.913+0.023 −0.025 R_{Jup}
Surface gravity (log g)	4.69+0.13 −0.11 cgs
Temperature	345±45 K
Age	5±3 Gyr

WISE 0146+4234B
Mass	10±4 M_{Jup}
Radius	0.919+0.034 −0.015 R_{Jup}
Surface gravity (log g)	4.65+0.14 −0.12 cgs
Temperature	330±45 K

Other designations
- WISE J014656.66+423410.0, WISE 0146+4234

Database references
SIMBAD	data

WISE J014656.66+423410.0 (designation abbreviated to WISE 0146+4234) is a binary brown dwarf of spectral classes T9 and Y0 located in the constellation Andromeda. It is approximately 60 light-years from Earth.

Analysis of the spectrum shows that the binary is probably old and has a total mass of 32+5
−6 M_{J} for an age of 10 billion years. If it is however young (about 1 billion years), it would be a pair of planetary-mass objects with a total mass of 8.7+1.3
−1.6 M_{J}. For an old system an orbital period of ≤10 years was predicted. Another work estimated an age of 5±3 billion years, which was then used to estimate masses of 7–15 M_{J} and 6–14 M_{J}. The binary was observed with JWST NIRSpec and MIRI. The unresolved spectrum shows strong absorption due to ammonia and methane, as well as weak carbon monoxide and carbon dioxide absorption. The researchers find that the spectrum resembles a combination of W0751 (484 K) and W1405 (392 K), but comparisons with models yields different temperatures (550 K and 325 K). The components have a large difference in Spitzer color, while having a small difference in temperature (92±23 K). This could hint at atmospheric changes at the T/Y transition.

== Discovery ==
WISE 0146+4234 was discovered in 2012 by J. Davy Kirkpatrick et al. from data, collected by Wide-field Infrared Survey Explorer (WISE) Earth-orbiting satellite—NASA infrared-wavelength 40 cm (16 in) space telescope, which mission lasted from December 2009 to February 2011. In 2012 Kirkpatrick et al. published a paper in The Astrophysical Journal, where they presented discovery of seven new found by WISE brown dwarfs of spectral type Y, among which also was WISE 0146+4234.

== Distance ==
The distance of WISE 0146+4234 was initially estimated to be 20 light-years from earth. Later measurements of its stellar parallax showed that it was actually 60 light-years away.

== See also ==
The other six discoveries of brown dwarfs, published in Kirkpatrick et al. (2012):

- WISE 0350-5658 (Y1)
- WISE 0359-5401 (Y0)
- WISE 0535-7500 (≥Y1)
- WISE 0713-2917 (Y0)
- WISE 0734-7157 (Y0)
- WISE 2220-3628 (Y0)
