= WISE 0535−7500 =

Astronomical object

WISE J053516.80−750024.9
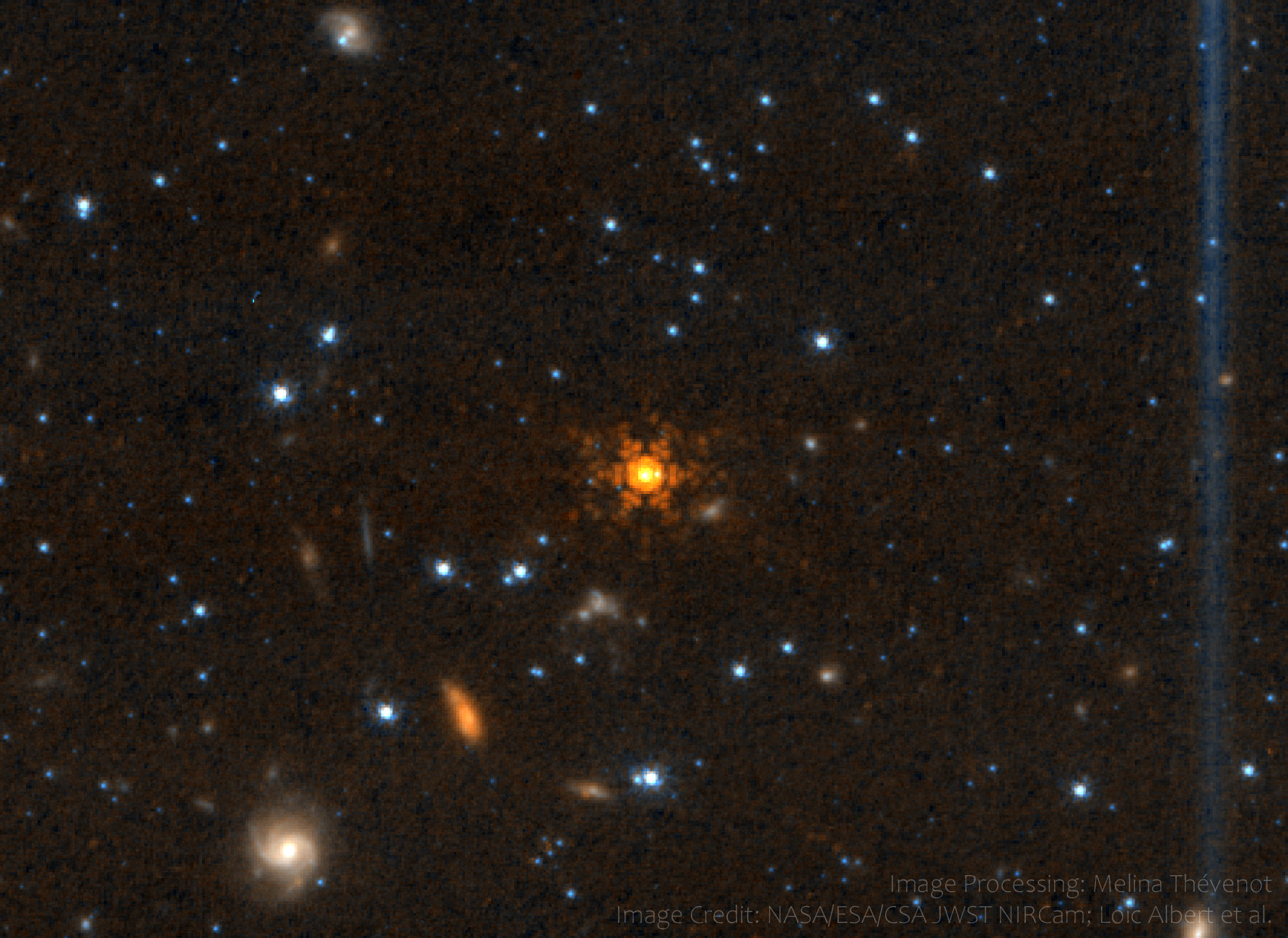
- WISE 0535-7500 (middle) in a crowded field. The Y-dwarf is located in front of the Rho Ophiuchi cloud complex, but is much closer than the cloud. Credit: NASA/ESA/CSA JWST NIRCam; Loic Albert et al. & Melina Thévenot

Observation data Epoch J2000 Equinox ICRS
- Constellation: Mensa
- Right ascension: 05^{h} 35^{m} 16.8^{s}
- Declination: −75° 00′ 24.9″

Characteristics
- Spectral type: Y1
- Apparent magnitude (J (MKO-NIR filter system)): >21.1
- Apparent magnitude (H (MKO-NIR filter system)): >21.6

Astrometry
Proper motion (μ)	RA: −127±4 mas/yr Dec.: 13±4 mas/yr
Parallax (π)	68.7±2.0 mas
Distance	47 ± 1 ly (14.6 ± 0.4 pc)

Details

Single object case
Mass	22+3 −4 M_{Jup}
Radius	1.53±0.04 R_{Jup}
Luminosity	10^{−6.216±0.026} L_{☉}
Surface gravity (log g)	4.37+0.06 −0.07 cgs
Temperature	395±6 K
Metallicity	$\begin{smallmatrix}\left[\ce{M}/\ce{H}\right]\end{smallmatrix}$ = +0.23±0.05
Age	2 Gyr

A (binary case)
Mass	18 M_{Jup}
Surface gravity (log g)	4.5 cgs
Temperature	480 K
Age	5 Gyr

B (binary case)
Mass	12 M_{Jup}
Surface gravity (log g)	4.5 cgs
Temperature	340 K
Age	5 Gyr

Other designations
- WISE J053516.80−750024.9, WISE 0535−7500

Database references
SIMBAD	data

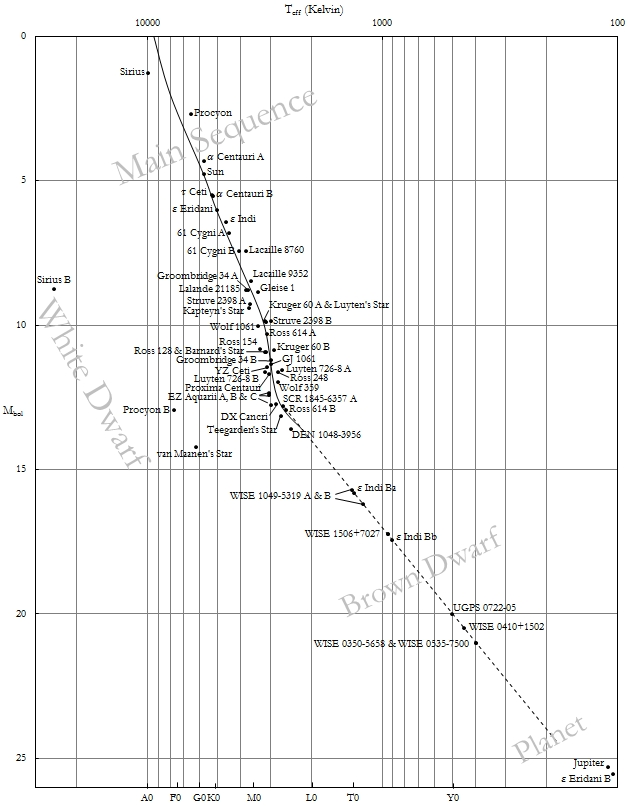
Hertzsprung-Russell diagram of all the nearest stars out to Gliese 1, as well as most brown dwarfs and some planets. WISE 0535−7500 is at bottom right

WISE J053516.80−750024.9 (designation abbreviated to WISE 0535−7500) is a possible binary system of two Y1-class brown dwarfs, in the constellation Mensa. Based on its parallax, its distance is roughly 48 light-years (14.6 parsecs).

== History of observations ==
WISE 0535−7500 was discovered in 2012 by J. Davy Kirkpatrick et al. from data, collected by Wide-field Infrared Survey Explorer (WISE) Earth-orbiting satellite—NASA infrared-wavelength 40-centimetre (16 in) space telescope, which mission lasted from December 2009 to February 2011. In 2012 Kirkpatrick et al. published a paper in The Astrophysical Journal, where they presented the discovery of seven new found by WISE brown dwarfs of spectral type Y, among which also was WISE 0535−7500.

In 2014, it was found that WISE 0535 is more luminous than predicted by atmospheric models. In 2016, it was suggested that such an over-luminosity could be explained if it is, in fact, a binary system of similar components. Close imaging has not revealed any companions within the detection capacities, implying that the separation between the components is less than 1.9 astronomical units. One 2024 study found that while the overluminosity could be reasonably explained by a metal-poor atmosphere, an unresolved binary system is a better possibility. The primary was estimated to have a mass of 18 M_{J} and an effective temperature of 450 K (177 °C; 350 °F), while the secondary has an estimated mass of 12 M_{J} and an effective temperature of 350 K (77 °C; 170 °F), with a system age of 5 Gyr. Similarly, a 2026 study found that the overluminosity can be explained by either binarity or a high surface gravity with or without a metal-poor atmosphere. The components would have temperatures of 480 K (207 °C; 404 °F) and 340 K (67 °C; 152 °F) with a near-solar metallicity. For the case that WISE 0535 is single star, a mass of 22+3
−4 M_{J}, a radius of 1.53±0.04 R_{J} and an effective temperature of 395 ± 6 K (121.85 ± 6.00 °C; 251.33 ± 10.80 °F) have been measured.

WISE 0535−7500 was studied with JWST by Beiler et al. in 2024 together with 22 other late-T and Y-dwarfs. WISE 0535−7500 stands out due to it having no discernable CO_{2} band and an almost undetectable CO band. This could be due a low metallicity or high surface gravity. These features make this object extremely red in Spitzer colors. This object also showed stronger NH_{3} absorption when compared to objects of the same temperature. Other common prominent features like H_{2}O and CH_{4} are present in its spectrum. But like other late-T and Y-dwarfs it is missing PH_{3}, which is predicted to occur for these objects.

== See also ==
- List of star systems within 45–50 light-years
- List of Y-dwarfs
