= J. Davy Kirkpatrick =

American astronomer

- Born: July 28, 1964 (age 62)
- Known for: Brown dwarfs, Low-mass stars, Stellar spectral classification
- Scientific career
- Fields: Astronomy
- Workplaces: California Institute of Technology

J. Davy Kirkpatrick is an American astronomer at the Infrared Processing and Analysis Center at the California Institute of Technology in Pasadena, California. Kirkpatrick's research was named one of the top ten science accomplishments of the first ten years (1992–2002) of the W. M. Keck Observatory and one of the Top 100 Stories of 2011 by Discover Magazine.

== Career ==
=== Education ===
Kirkpatrick received a BS in mathematics and physics/astronomy from Vanderbilt University in 1986 and a PhD in astronomy from the University of Arizona in 1992. He was a W. J. McDonald Fellow at the University of Texas at Austin from 1992-1994, a National Research Council Fellow at JPL from 1994-1996, and a NICMOS Fellow at UCLA from 1996-1997 before being hired at Caltech, where he works today.

=== Brown Dwarfs and Low-mass Stars ===
Much of Kirkpatrick's research has concentrated on the discovery and characterization of the lowest mass stars and brown dwarfs. After refining the far optical and near-infrared classifications of M dwarfs in the early 1990s and publishing the first spectrum of the brown dwarf candidate GD 165B, which would later be referred to as the first L dwarf discovery, Kirkpatrick joined the Two Micron All-Sky Survey (2MASS) team to search for even colder objects. Along with Neill Reid, he uncovered many objects similar to and colder than GD 165B, leading to the definition of the L dwarf spectral class. Also using 2MASS data, he and graduate student Adam Burgasser discovered brown dwarfs even colder than spectral class L, leading to the establishment of the T dwarf spectral class. More recently, as a member of the Wide-field Infrared Survey Explorer (WISE) team, Kirkpatrick and his research group have uncovered even colder brown dwarfs, leading to the establishment, with postdoc Michael Cushing, of the Y dwarf spectral class.

Along with Adam Burgasser and Chris Gelino, Kirkpatrick maintains a listing of all known L, T, and Y dwarf discoveries at the DwarfArchives website.

=== Tyche ===
Kirkpatrick is credited with first using the name "Tyche" to refer to a heretofore unseen, low-mass Solar companion in the Oort Cloud. He chose this term to be in direct contrast to "Nemesis", an unseen Solar companion hypothesized to lie in a highly elliptical orbit and to be responsible for periodic mass extinctions on the Earth. Kirkpatrick's own search using the 2MASS data set rules out any Solar companion more massive than 30 Jupiter masses, although analysis of the WISE data set should set much more stringent limits.

== Selected publications ==
- "New Spectral Types L and T" from Annual Review of Astronomy and Astrophysics, 2005
- "M Dwarfs and L Dwarfs", Chapter 9 of Stellar Spectral Classification

== Awards and honors ==
- 2011 Wendell G. Holladay Lectureship
- 2010 Marc Aaronson Memorial Lectureship
- 2003 Watkins Visiting Professorship, Wichita State University
- 1986 Underwood Award, Vanderbilt University Department of Physics and Astronomy
