= Laurance Doyle =

American astronomer

- Education: M.S. San Diego State University (1982); Ph.D. University of Heidelberg (1986)
- Occupations: Astrophysicist; SETI Institute; NASA Ames Research Center

Laurance R. Doyle (born 1953) is an American scientist who received his Ph.D. from the Ruprecht Karl University of Heidelberg.

Doyle has worked at the SETI Institute since 1987 where he is a principal investigator and astrophysicist. His main area of study has been the formation and detection of extrasolar planets, but he has also worked on communications theory. In particular he has written on how patterns in animal communication relate to humans with an emphasis on cetaceans.

== Early life ==
Doyle grew up on a dairy farm in Cambria, California and therefore, didn't have much access to information about stars. But by reading books at the local library, Doyle was able to develop his knowledge in astronomy, and eventually obtain his Bachelor's and Master's of Science degrees in astronomy from San Diego State University.

== Career ==
His first job was at the Jet Propulsion Laboratory as an imaging engineer, where he was in charge of analyzing pictures of Jupiter and Saturn sent from the spacecraft Voyager. He moved to Heidelberg, Germany, to help analyze images of Halley's Comet. He got his doctorate in Astrophysics at the University of Heidelberg.

In 2011, Doyle led the team which discovered Kepler-16b, the first confirmed circumbinary planet, nicknamed "Tatooine" after the fictional planet from Star Wars.

Doyle is currently seeking to compare dolphin whistles, whale sounds, and baby babble in an attempt to make predictions about extraterrestrial communications. He believes that by measuring the complexity of communications for different species on Earth, we could get a good indication of how advanced an extraterrestrial signal is using an application of Zipf's law. His study determined that babies babble over 800 different sounds with the same amount of frequency as dolphins. As they grow older, those sounds decrease to around 50 and become more repetitious. The study found that baby dolphins develop similarly in regards to their whistling.

Doyle is faculty at Principia College and the founding Director of Principia College's Institute for the Metaphysics of Physics, founded in 2014.

== In popular culture ==
In May 2005, he appeared on a National Geographic Channel special titled Extraterrestrial. In 2012, he appeared in the episode "Will We Survive First Contact," of The Science Channel series Through the Wormhole narrated by Morgan Freeman.

== Selected works ==
- Reflections of a SETI Scientist (2022)
