= Circumbinary planet =

Planet that orbits two stars instead of one

Typical configuration of circumbinary planetary systems (not to scale), in which A and B are the primary and secondary star, while ABb denotes the circumbinary planet

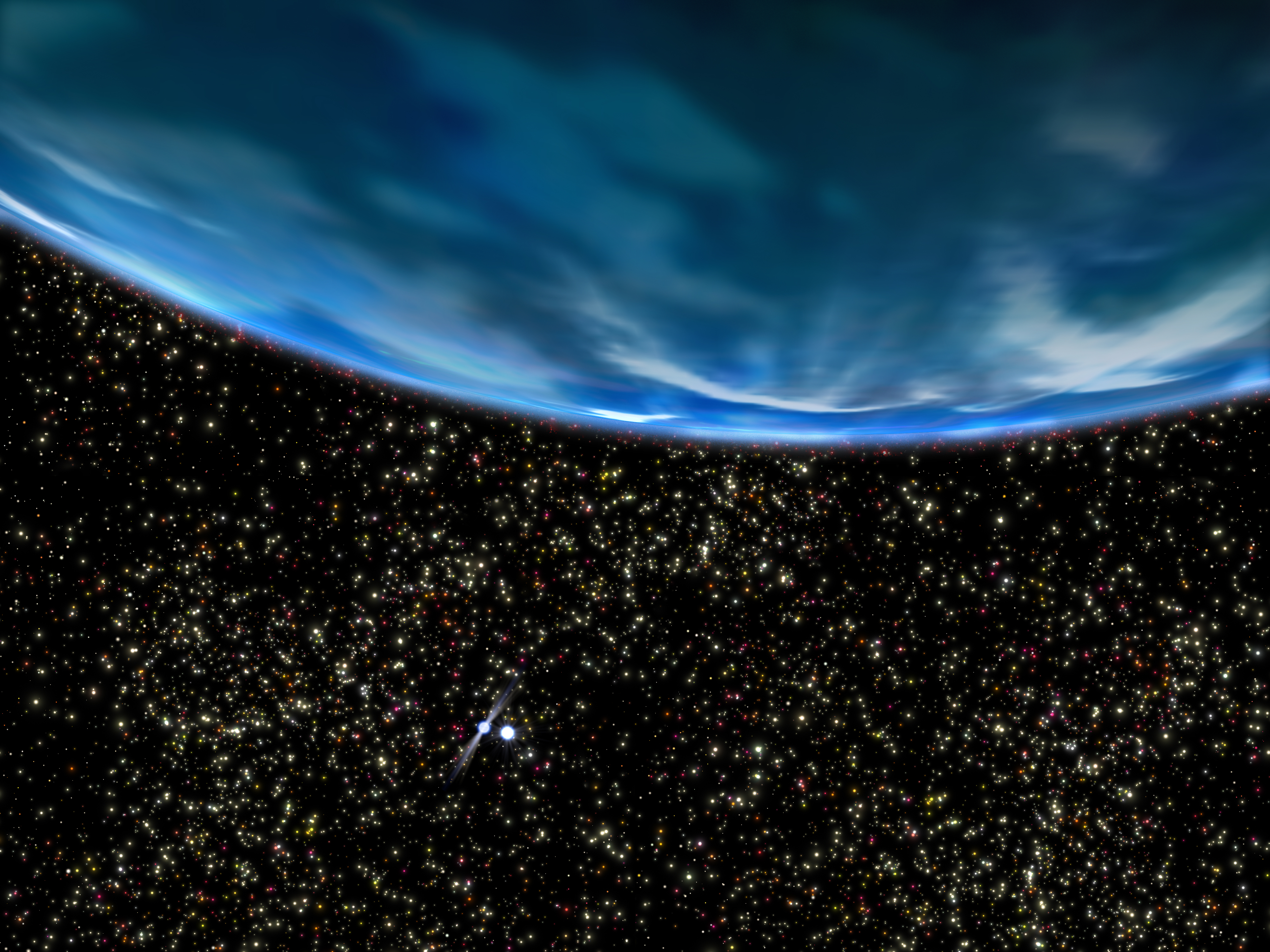
An artist's impression of the giant planet orbiting the binary system PSR B1620-26, which contains a pulsar and a white dwarf star and is located in the globular cluster M4

A circumbinary planet is a planet that orbits two stars instead of one. The two stars orbit each other in a binary system, while the planet orbits farther from the center of the system than either of the two stars. In contrast, circumstellar planets in a binary system have stable orbits around one of the two stars, closer in than the orbital distance of the other star (see Habitability of binary star systems). Studies in 2013 showed that there is a strong hint that a circumbinary planet and its stars originate from a single disk.

== Observations and discoveries ==
=== Confirmed planets ===
==== PSR B1620-26 ====
The first confirmed circumbinary planet was found orbiting the system PSR B1620-26, which contains a millisecond pulsar and a white dwarf and is located in the globular cluster M4. The existence of the third body was first reported in 1993, and was suggested to be a planet based on 5 years of observational data. In 2003 the planet was characterised as being 2.5 times the mass of Jupiter in a low eccentricity orbit with a semimajor axis of 23 AU.

==== Kepler-16 ====
On 15 September 2011, astronomers, using data from NASA's Kepler space telescope, announced the first partial-eclipse-based discovery of a circumbinary planet. The planet, called Kepler-16b, is about 200 light years from Earth, in the constellation Cygnus, and is believed to be a frozen world of rock and gas, about the mass of Saturn. It orbits two stars that are also circling each other, one about two-thirds the size of the Sun, the other about a fifth the size of the Sun. Each orbit of the stars by the planet takes 229 days, while the planet orbits the system's center of mass every 225 days; the stars eclipse each other every three weeks or so.

==== PH1 (Kepler-64) ====
In 2012, volunteers of the Planet Hunters project discovered PH1b (Planet Hunters 1 b), a circumbinary planet in a quadruple star system.

==== Kepler-453 ====
In 2015, astronomers confirmed the existence of Kepler-453b, a circumbinary planet with orbital period of 240.5 days.

==== Kepler-1647 ====
A new planet, called Kepler-1647b, was announced on June 13, 2016, discovered using the Kepler telescope. The planet is a gas giant, similar in size to Jupiter which makes it the second largest circumbinary planet ever discovered, next to PSR B1620-26. It is located in the stars' habitable zone, and it orbits the star system in 1107 days, which gives it the longest period of any confirmed transiting exoplanet so far.

==== TOI-1338 b ====
A large planet called TOI-1338 b, around 6.9 times as large as Earth and 1,300 light years away, was announced on January 6, 2020.

=== Other observations ===
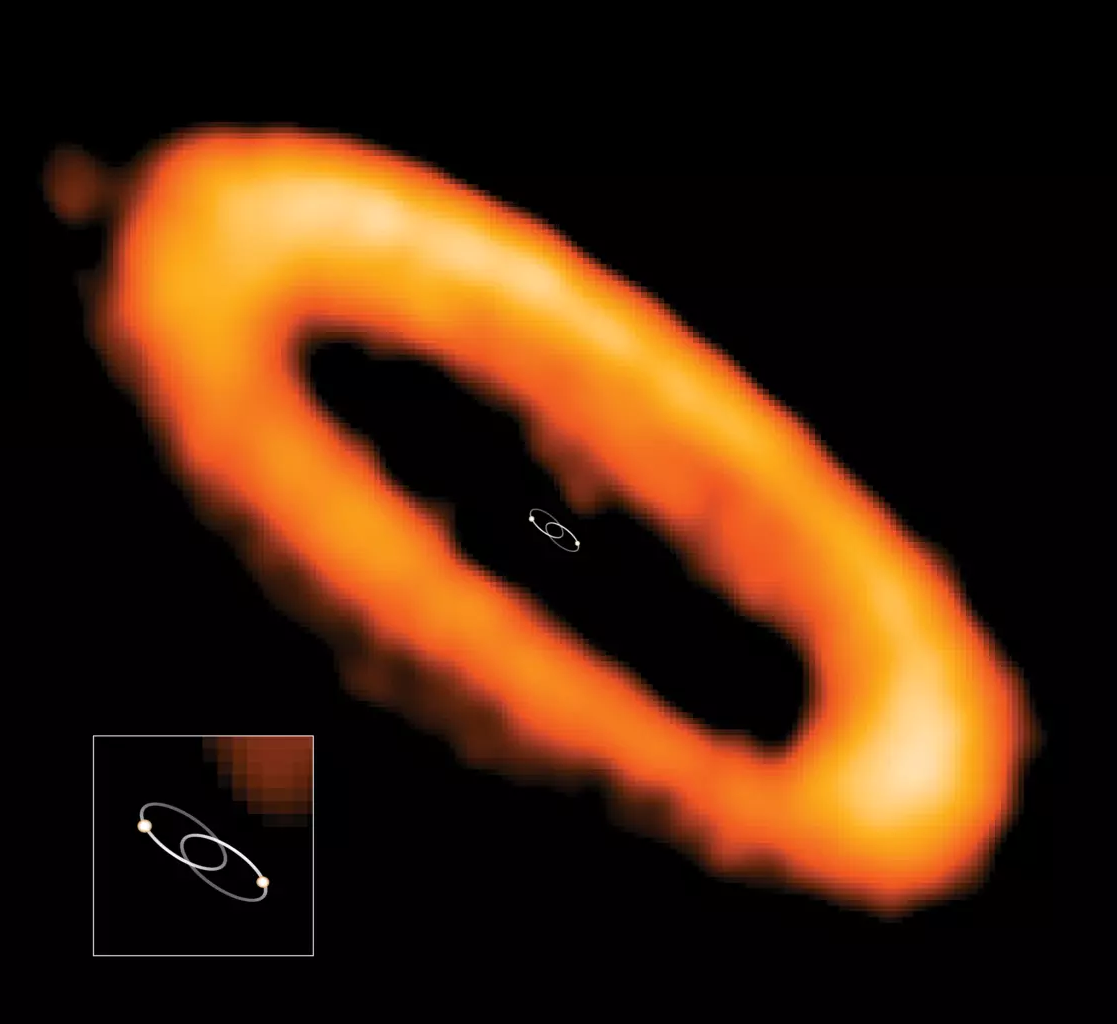
The circumbinary disk around AK Scorpii, a young system in the constellation Scorpius. The image of the disk was taken with ALMA.

Claims of a planet discovered via microlensing, orbiting the close binary pair MACHO-1997-BLG-41, were announced in 1999. The planet was said to be in a wide orbit around the two red dwarf companions, but the claims were later retracted, as it turned out the detection could be better explained by the orbital motion of the binary stars themselves.

Several attempts have been made to detect planets around the eclipsing binary system CM Draconis, itself part of the triple system GJ 630.1. The eclipsing binary has been surveyed for transiting planets, but no conclusive detections were made and eventually the existence of all the candidate planets was ruled out. More recently, efforts have been made to detect variations in the timing of the eclipses of the stars caused by the reflex motion associated with an orbiting planet, but at present no discovery has been confirmed. The orbit of the binary stars is eccentric, which is unexpected for such a close binary as tidal forces ought to have circularised the orbit. This may indicate the presence of a massive planet or brown dwarf in orbit around the pair whose gravitational effects maintain the eccentricity of the binary.

Circumbinary discs that may indicate processes of planet formation have been found around several stars, and are in fact common around binaries with separations less than 3 AU. One notable example is in the HD 98800 system, which comprises two pairs of binary stars separated by around 34 AU. The binary subsystem HD 98800 B, which consists of two stars of 0.70 and 0.58 solar masses in a highly eccentric orbit with semimajor axis 0.983 AU, is surrounded by a complex dust disc that is being warped by the gravitational effects of the mutually-inclined and eccentric stellar orbits. The other binary subsystem, HD 98800 A, is not associated with significant amounts of dust.

==== HW Virginis ====
Announced in 2008, the eclipsing binary system HW Virginis, comprising a subdwarf B star and a red dwarf, was claimed to also host a planetary system. The claimed planets have masses at least 8.47 and 19.23 times that of Jupiter respectively, and were proposed to have orbital periods of 9 and 16 years. The proposed outer planet is sufficiently massive that it may be considered to be a brown dwarf under some definitions of the term, but the discoverers claimed that the orbital configuration implies it would have formed like a planet from a circumbinary disc. Both planets may have accreted additional mass when the primary star lost material during its red giant phase.

Further work on the system showed that the orbits proposed for the candidate planets were catastrophically unstable on timescales far shorter than the age of the system. Indeed, the authors found that the system was so unstable that it simply cannot exist, with mean lifetimes of less than a thousand years across the whole range of plausible orbital solutions. Like other planetary systems proposed around similar evolved binary star systems, it seems likely that some mechanism other than claimed planets is responsible for the observed behaviour of the binary stars – and that the claimed planets simply do not exist.

== Rarity of circumbinary planets ==
Binary stars are as common as single stars yet thousands of planets around single stars have been discovered and very few circumbinary planets have been found. A 2025 study says this is because of general relativity. The planet's orbit precesses and the orbit of the binary stars also precesses. Over time, tidal interactions bring the stars closer together, which causes the precession rate of the stars to increase, but the precession rate of the planet to slow. When the two precession rates coincide, the planet's orbit becomes more eccentric, taking it farther from the stars but also nearer at its closest approach. The planet either gets engulfed by one of the stars or ejected from the system. The planets that survive this process are mostly too far from the stars to be detected by the transit method.

== System characteristics ==
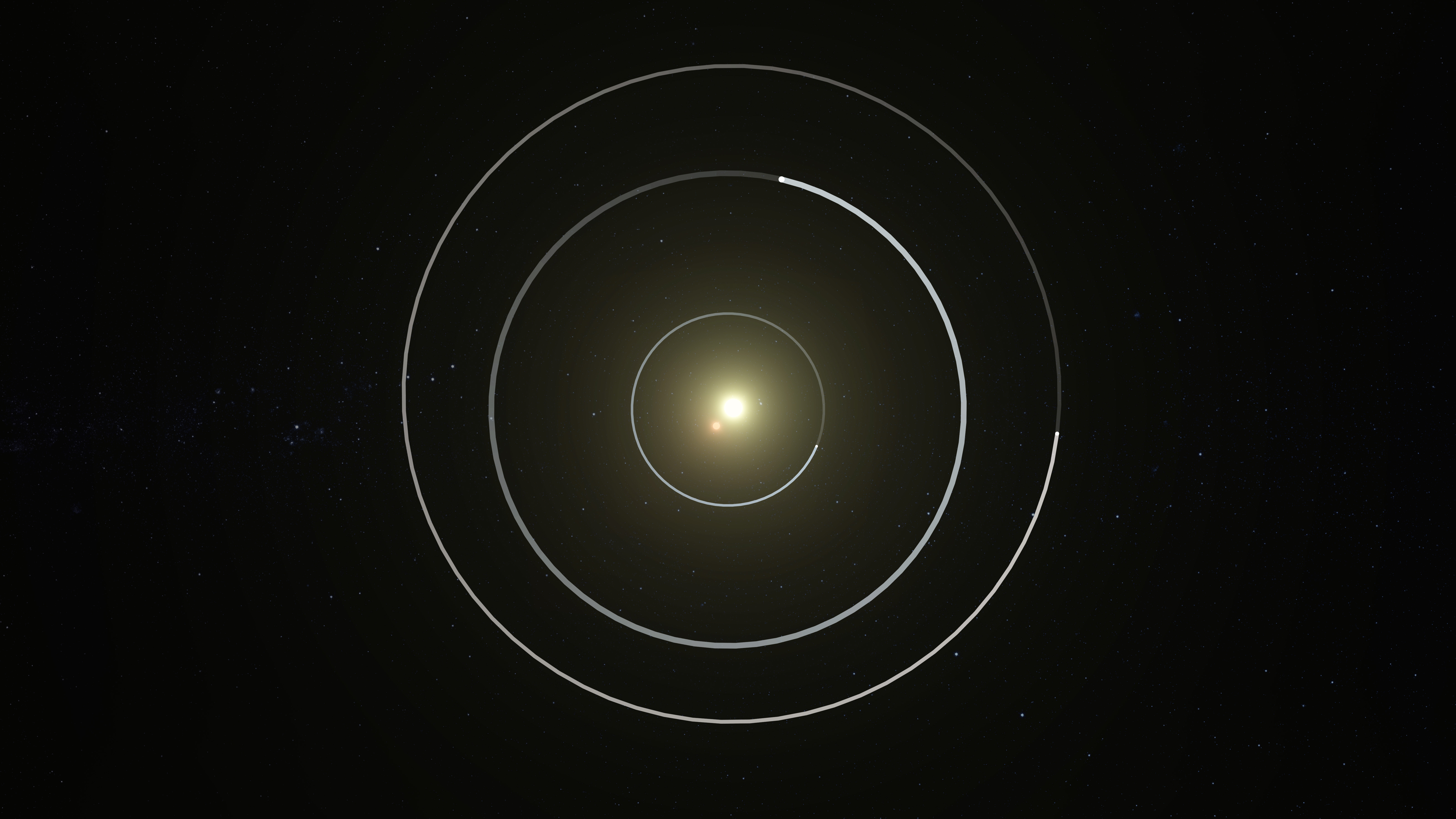
Kepler-47 has a compact system with three circumbinary planets.

The Kepler space telescope results indicate circumbinary planetary systems are relatively common (as of October 2013 the spacecraft had found seven planets out of roughly 1000 eclipsing binaries searched).

=== Stellar configuration ===
There is a wide range of stellar configurations for which circumbinary planets can exist. Primary star masses range from 0.69 to 1.53 solar masses (Kepler-16 A and PH1 Aa), star mass ratios from 1.03 to 3.76 (Kepler-34 and PH1), and binary eccentricity from 0.023 to 0.521 (Kepler-47 and Kepler-34). The distribution of planet eccentricities, range from nearly circular e=0.007 to a significant e=0.182 (Kepler-16 and Kepler-34). No orbital resonances with the binary have been found.

=== Orbital dynamics ===
The binary stars Kepler-34 A and B have a highly eccentric orbit (e = 0.521) around each other and their interaction with the planet is strong enough that a deviation from Kepler's laws is noticeable after just one orbit.

=== Co-planarity ===
All Kepler circumbinary planets that were known as of August 2013 orbit their stars very close to the plane of the binary (in a prograde direction) which suggests a single-disk formation. However, not all circumbinary planets are co-planar with the binary: Kepler-413b is tilted 2.5 degrees which may be due to the gravitational influence of other planets or a third star. Taking into account the selection biases, the average mutual inclination between the planetary orbits and the stellar binaries is within ~3 degrees, consistent with the mutual inclinations of planets in multi-planetary systems.

=== Axial tilt precession ===
The axial tilt of Kepler-413b's spin axis might vary by as much as 30 degrees over 11 years, leading to rapid and erratic changes in seasons.

=== Migration ===
Simulations show that it is likely that all of the circumbinary planets known prior to a 2014 study migrated significantly from their formation location with the possible exception of Kepler-47 (AB)c.

=== Semi-major axes close to critical radius ===
The minimum stable star to circumbinary planet separation is about 2–4 times the binary star separation, or orbital period about 3–8 times the binary period. The innermost planets in all the Kepler circumbinary systems have been found orbiting close to this radius. The planets have semi-major axes that lie between 1.09 and 1.46 times this critical radius. The reason could be that migration might become inefficient near the critical radius, leaving planets just outside this radius.

Recently, it has been found that the distribution of the innermost planetary semi-major axes is consistent with a log-uniform distribution, taking into account the selection biases, where closer-in planets can be detected more easily. This questions the pile-up of planets near the stability limit as well as the dominance of planet migration.

=== Absence of planets around shorter period binaries ===
Most Kepler eclipsing binaries have periods less than 1 day but the shortest period of a Kepler eclipsing binary hosting a planet is 7.4 days (Kepler-47). The short-period binaries are unlikely to have formed in such a tight orbit and their lack of planets may be related to the mechanism that removed angular momentum allowing the stars to orbit so closely. One exception is the planet around an X-ray binary MXB 1658-298, which has an orbital period of 7.1 hours.

=== Planet size limit ===
As of June 2016, all but one of the confirmed Kepler circumbinary planets are smaller than Jupiter. This cannot be a selection effect because larger planets are easier to detect. Simulations had predicted this would be the case.

=== Habitability ===
All the Kepler circumbinary planets are either close to or actually in the habitable zone. None of them are terrestrial planets, but large moons of such planets could be habitable. Because of the stellar binarity, the insolation received by the planet will likely be time-varying in a way quite unlike the regular sunlight Earth receives.

=== Transit probability ===
Circumbinary planets are generally more likely to transit than planets around a single star. The probability when the planetary orbit overlaps with the stellar binary orbit has been obtained. For planets orbiting eclipsing stellar binaries (such as the detected systems), the analytical expression of the transit probability in a finite observation time has been obtained.

=== Composition ===
Circumbinary planets should preferentially be icy, not rocky.

=== Metallicity ===
Close binary systems hosting exoplanets are more metal-poor than single exoplanet-hosting stars. Wide binary systems are more metal-rich compared to single stars.

== List of circumbinary planets ==
=== Confirmed circumbinary planets ===
Star system	Star types	Planet	Mass (M_{J})	Semimajor axis (AU)	Orbital period (days)	Parameter Ref.	Discovered	Discovery method
PSR B1620−26	NS + WD	b	2.5±1	23	~ 24820		1993, 2003 (confirmed)	Pulsar timing
DP Leonis	WD + M	b	6.05±0.47	8.19±0.39	10220±730		2010	Eclipse Timing Variations
Ross 458	M + M	C	5–14	1168	?		2010	Direct imaging
SR 12	M + M	c	11±3	980	?		2011	Direct imaging
UZ Fornacis	WD + M	b	6.3±1.5	5.9±1.4	5840±1095		2011	Eclipse Timing Variations
UZ Fornacis	WD + M	c	7.7±1.2	2.8±0.5	1916.25±91.25		2011	Eclipse Timing Variations
Kepler-16	K + M	b	0.333±0.016	0.7048±0.0011	228.776+0.020 −0.037		2011	Transit
Kepler-34	G + G	b	0.220±0.0011	1.0896±0.0009	288.822+0.063 −0.081		2011	Transit
Kepler-35	G + G	b	0.127±0.02	0.603±0.001	131.458+0.077 −0.105		2011	Transit
Kepler-38	G + M	b	< 0.384	0.4644±0.0082	105.595+0.053 −0.038		2012	Transit
Kepler-47	G + M	b	0.0065+0.0746 −0.0065	0.2877+0.0014 −0.0011	49.4643+0.0081 −0.0074		2012	Transit
Kepler-47	G + M	c	0.0100+0.0069 −0.0039	0.9638+0.0041 −0.0044	303.227+0.062 −0.027		2012	Transit
Kepler-47	G + M	d	0.0598+0.0750 −0.0367	0.6992+0.0031 −0.0033	187.366+0.069 −0.051		2019	Transit
PH1	F + M	b	< 0.532	0.634±0.011	138.506+0.107 −0.092		2012	Transit
Delorme 1	M + M	b	13±1	102+47 −27	614300+477700 −229400		2013	Direct imaging
ROXs 42B	M + M	b	9±3	140±10	?		2013	Direct imaging
Kepler-413	K + M	b	0.21+0.07 −0.07	0.3553+0.0020 −0.0018	66.262+0.024 −0.021		2014	Transit
Kepler-451	sdB + M	b	1.9±0.1	0.92±0.02	416±2		2015	Eclipse Timing Variations
Kepler-451	sdB + M	c	?	?	1460±90		2022	Eclipse Timing Variations
Kepler-451	sdB + M	d	?	?	43±0.1		2022	Eclipse Timing Variations
Kepler-453	? + ?	b	< 0.05	0.7903±0.0028	240.503±0.053		2014	Transit
VHS J1256−1257	M + M	b	12.0±0.1 or 16±1	350+110 −150	~6×10^{6}		2015	Direct imaging
Kepler-1647	F + F	b	1.52±0.65	2.7205±0.0070	1107.5923±0.0227		2016	Transit
HD 106906	F + F	b	11±2	650	?		2014 (Note: Planet was discovered in 2014, but the binarity of the host star was discovered in 2016.)	Direct imaging
OGLE-2007-BLG-349	M + M	b	0.25±0.041	2.59	?		2016	Microlensing
OGLE-2016-BLG-0613L	? + ?	b	4.18+3.19 −2.43	6.40+2.51 −2.63	?		2017	Microlensing
2MASS J0249-0557	M + M	c	11.6+1.3 −1.0	1950	?		2018	Direct imaging
Kepler-1661	K + M	b	0.053±0.038	0.633±0.005	175.06±0.06		2020	Transit
OGLE-2018-BLG-1700L	M + M	b	4.40+3.04 −2.00	2.8+3.2 −2.5	?		2020	Microlensing
TOI-1338	F + M	b	0.0355+0.0066 −0.0067	0.4607+0.0084 −0.0088	95.4001+0.0062 −0.0056		2020	Transit
TOI-1338	F + M	c	0.237+0.013 −0.011	0.794±0.016	215.79+0.46 −0.51		2023	Radial velocity
TIC 172900988	F + F	b	2.964±0.018	0.9028±0.0002	200.452±0.011	(Note: Multiple orbital solutions.)	2021	Transit
b Centauri	B + B	b	10.9±1.6	556±17	2650±7170		2021	Direct imaging
OGLE-2019-BLG-1470L	? + ?	c	2.2-5.4	2.9-3.5	?		2022	Microlensing
Kepler-1660	F + F	b	4.992±0.230	0.80±0.005	239.5044±0.0686		2017 (Note: Also known as KIC 5095269. Planet confirmed in 2023.)	Eclipsing binary timing
OGLE-2023-BLG-0836L	? + ?	b	4.36+0.013 −0.011	6.40+4.36 −2.18	?		2024	Microlensing
Gliese 900 (Note: Circumtriple planet)	K+M+M	b	10.47	12,000	5×10^{8}		2024	Direct imaging
BEBOP-3	F + M	b	0.56	1.444 ±0.017	547+6.2 −7.6		2025	Radial velocity
WISPIT 1	K + M	b	10.4+1.1 −0.8	338			2025	Direct imaging
WISPIT 1	K + M	c	5.3+1.1 −0.6	840			2025	Direct imaging
HD 143811	F + F	b	6.1+0.7 −0.9	63+30 −12	117000+90600 −31400		2025	Direct imaging

=== Unconfirmed or doubtful ===
The claimed circumbinary planet in the microlensing event MACHO-1997-BLG-41 has been disproven. The circumbinary companion to FW Tauri was once thought to be planetary-mass, but has been shown to be a low-mass star of about 0.1 M_{☉}, forming a triple star system.

A strong candidate for a circumbinary planet in a polar orbit around 2M1510, a binary brown dwarf, was announced in 2025. The discovery was made with the Very Large Telescope. In a search for circumbinary planets with non-coplanar orbits, 27 new candidate planets were found through the detection of apsidal precession in eclipsing binary-stars.

A co-moving object was discovered around the resolved binary or triple star system 2M1006 (CPD-63 1286). The candidate co-moves with the triple with a separation of around 730 AU. It was not possible to determine if the candidate orbit the star system, because the barycenter was not known at the time of discovery. If it has the same age as the primary star, the candidate should have a mass of 3-5 M_{J}, and therefore could be a low-mass planet like AF Lep b or 51 Eri b.

Many circumbinary planets have been claimed based on eclipse timing variations in post-common envelope binaries, but most of these claims have been challenged as planetary models often fail to predict future changes in eclipse timing. Other proposed causes, such as the Applegate mechanism, often cannot fully explain the observations either, so the true cause of these variations remains unclear. Some of these proposed planets are listed in the table below.

Star system	Planet	Mass (M_{J})	Semimajor axis (AU)	Orbital period	Parameter Ref.	Discovered	Discovery method
NN Serpentis (Note: Challenged by e.g. Pulley et al. 2022)	c	7.33±0.31	5.35±0.06	5573.55±102.2		2010	Eclipse Timing Variations
NN Serpentis	d	2.3±0.5	3.43±0.14	2883.5±182.5		2010	Eclipse Timing Variations
HU Aquarii (Note: Challenged by e.g. Schwope & Thinius 2018)	c	?	3.6±0.8	2390±4		2011	Eclipse Timing Variations
HU Aquarii	b	?	5.4±0.9	4368±515		2011	Eclipse Timing Variations
NY Virginis	b	2.85	3.457	3073.3		2012	Eclipse Timing Variations
NY Virginis	c	?	?	8799±240		2019	Eclipse Timing Variations
RR Caeli	b	4.2±0.4	5.3±0.6	4343.5±36.5		2012	Eclipse Timing Variations
DE Canum Venaticorum	b	?	5.75±2.02	4098.1±131.5		2017	Eclipsing timing Variable
NSVS 14256825	b	?	3.12±0.07	3225±22		2019	Eclipse Timing Variations

== Fiction ==
Circumbinary planets are depicted in science fiction stories:

- In David Lindsay's A Voyage to Arcturus, Lindsay imagines that Arcturus is a binary system made up of the stars Branchspell and Alppain, and orbited by the planet Tormance.
- In the Trigun series, the planet orbits a binary star system.
- In the Star Wars series, the planet Tatooine orbits in a close binary system.
- In the series Doctor Who, a binary system with such a planet is featured in The Chase. "Gridlock" also depicts the planet Gallifrey as in a binary system, but possibly in a non-circumbinary orbit.
- In the Star Fox series, the planets orbit Lylat and Solar (an M-class red dwarf).
- In the Hitchhiker's Guide to the Galaxy series, the circumbinary planet Magrathea is described as the "most improbable planet that ever existed".
- In Stanisław Lem's Solaris, the titular planet orbits a binary system of a red and a blue star.

== See also ==
- List of planet types
- Circumtriple planet
- Extrasolar planets in fiction § In multiple star systems
- Second generation planet
