= Tatooine =

Fictional planet in the Star Wars universe

- Star Wars location
- The planet Tatooine, as seen in Star Wars (1997 special edition)
- First appearance: Star Wars: From the Adventures of Luke Skywalker (1976 novelization); Star Wars (1977, first theatrical appearance)
- Last appearance: Star Wars: Young Jedi Adventures (2023)
- Created by: George Lucas
- Genre: Science fiction

In-universe information
- Type: Desert planet
- Races: Human; Hutt; Jawa; Tusken Raiders
- Locations: Mos Eisley; Bestine; Mos Espa; Mos Pelgo; Anchorhead
- Characters: C-3PO; Chewbacca; Bib Fortuna; Jabba the Hutt; Obi-Wan Kenobi; Beru Lars; Owen Lars; Anakin Skywalker; Luke Skywalker; Han Solo; Watto several others
- Terrain: Desert
- Oceans: 0
- Moons: 3
- Star(s): 2
- Grid Coordinates: R-17

Tatooine (/ˌtætuˈiːn/ tat-oo-EEN) is a fictional desert planet that appears in the Star Wars franchise. It is a beige-colored, desolate world orbiting a pair of binary stars, and inhabited by human settlers and a variety of other life-forms. The planet was first seen in the original 1977 film Star Wars and has been seen or mentioned in a substantial number of Star Wars theatrical films and television series since.

Despite being a relative backwater planet in the Star Wars canon, Tatooine plays a significant role in the franchise's Skywalker Saga and other attached storylines, being the birthplace of Anakin Skywalker (later known as Darth Vader) as well as the planet on which the protagonist of the original trilogy, Anakin's son Luke Skywalker, was raised. Following the events of Order 66 and Anakin's fall to the dark side of the Force, the newborn Luke is secretly exiled to Tatooine with the help of Obi-Wan Kenobi, who takes up residence on the planet under the name "Ben Kenobi" in order to watch over Luke. Shots of the binary sunset over the Tatooine desert are considered to be an iconic image of the film series, along with the greatest sunset scenes in cinematic history.

== Development ==
In his early drafts of the Star Wars story, author George Lucas changed the names of planets and characters several times. In his early treatment, Lucas opened the story on the fourth moon of the planet Utapau, the home of a young warrior called Annikin Starkiller. In Lucas's rough draft, The Star Wars (1974), the escaping droids land in a desert on the planet Aquilae; in later drafts the planet again takes the name of Utapau. Prior to production, early artwork commissioned by Lucas from conceptual illustrator Ralph McQuarrie show robots lost on a desert world, scorched by twin suns and mysterious, masked Tusken Raiders riding large horned Banthas.

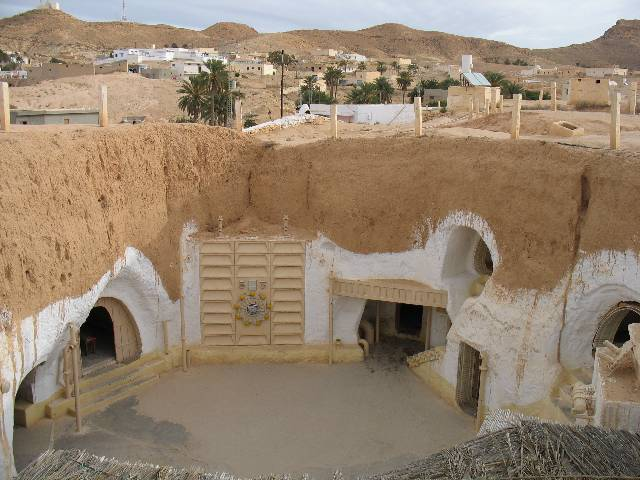
Hotel Sidi Driss, used for the Lars homestead scenes

George Lucas originally envisaged filming the Utapau/Tatooine scenes in Algeria (inspired by Michelangelo Antonioni's 1975 film The Passenger), Libya or Iran, but these locations were rejected by 20th Century Fox. When production began on Star Wars, production designers John Barry and Robert Watts scouted for filming locations in Morocco and Tunisia. Lucas, accompanied by producer Gary Kurtz visited the Tunisian island of Djerba with them and were impressed by the desert landscape and the unusual architecture, and selected Tunisia to provide the desert planet setting. Lucas was also keen to shoot at the Hotel Sidi Driss in Matmata, a decision which extended the shoot, and consequently the budget, by a day. Filming in Tunisia began on March 22, 1976, and immediately ran into difficulty: the region was experiencing its first heavy rainfall in seven years, which disrupted the setting of an arid desert planet. The Matmata hotel consisted of a troglodyte dwelling in a large hole in the ground. Combined with shots at Chott el Djerid, near Nefta, this formed the setting for the Lars homestead and moisture farm. The landing site for C-3PO and R2-D2's escape pod was filmed in sand dunes at La Grande Dune, near Nefta, and exterior shots of Mos Eisley spaceport were shot on Djerba. The name Tatooine is not actually mentioned in the final screenplay of Star Wars—Lucas was still working on his fourth draft while scouting locations, and adapted the name from a town in southern Tunisia called Tataouine (French spelling, or Tataween spelling in Tunisian Arabic).

Certain scenes filmed on Djerba were subsequently deleted from the final cut of the film in order to improve the narrative pace. The most significant material cut was a series of scenes set in the township of Anchorhead which served to introduce the characters of Luke Skywalker and Biggs Darklighter. Lucas asked film editor Richard Chew to cut these scenes as they had been likened to "American Graffiti in outer space" by Fox executives (in reference to Lucas's 1973 film).

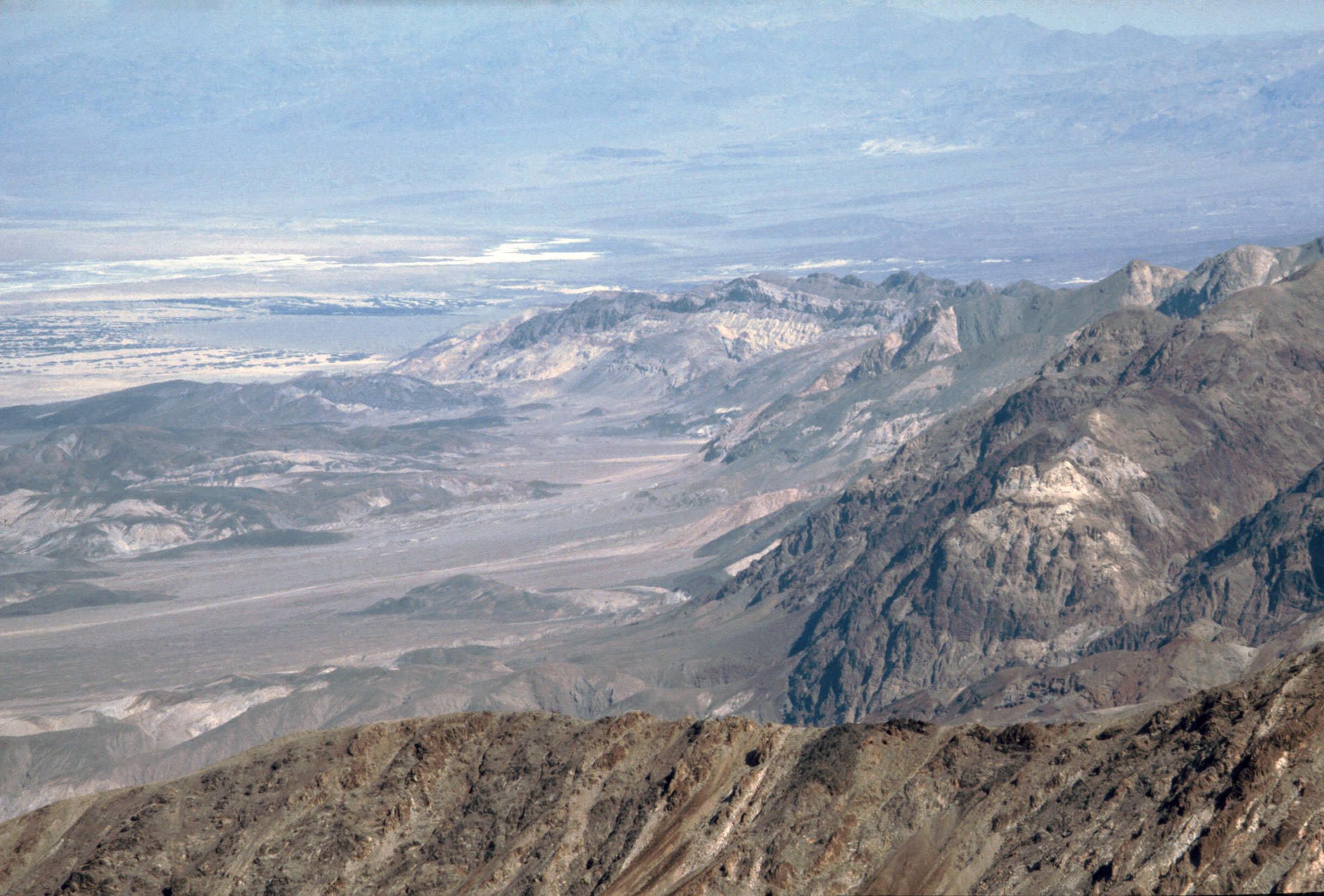
Dante's View, Death Valley, California

Footage filmed at Sidi Bouhlel in Tunisia was combined with 1977 second unit filming at Death Valley National Park in California to create the rocky canyon scenes featuring Jawas and Tusken Raiders.

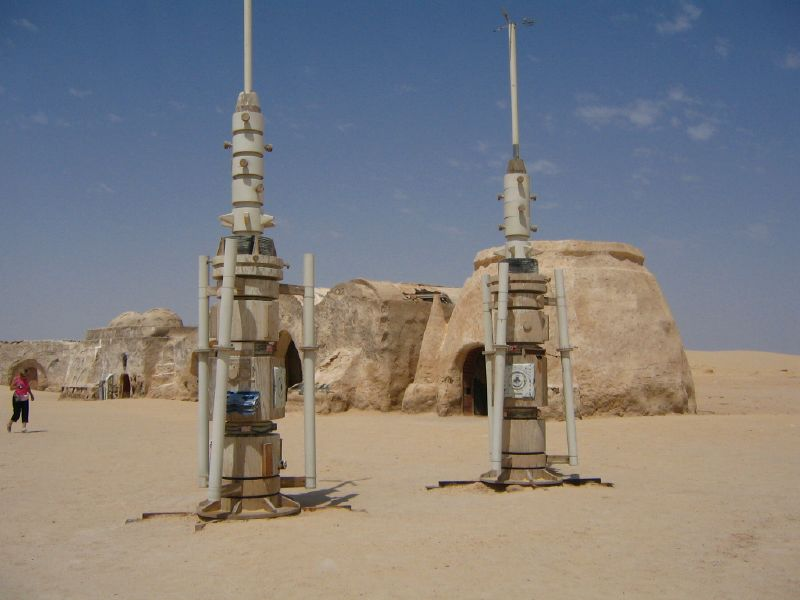
Moisture vaporator sets from the prequel films left at Tozeur

When crews returned to Tunisia to film for the Star Wars prequel films in 1998, locations at Onk Jemal (Ong Jmal) in Tozeur, Ksar Ouled Soltane and Ksar Hadada, Ghomrassen were used for Tatooine scenes. Abandoned sets for the filming have been left in the desert but can be visited.

== Film appearances ==
Tatooine originally featured in the 1977 film Star Wars, and was the first planet to be seen in the film franchise. In the opening scene, the planet and two of its moons are seen in space against a sea of stars, forming the backdrop of a space battle which sets in motion the events of the film. Two robots, C-3PO and R2-D2, jettison in an escape pod from a captured spaceship, the Tantive IV, and land on the surface of Tatooine. The droids lose their way in a sparse desert and are captured by small scavenger creatures called Jawas. When the robots are sold on to human settlers, protagonist Luke Skywalker is introduced as a young man living with his aunt and uncle on a farm. The hostility of the arid desert environment is emphasised by the depiction of sandstorms and the heat of the binary stars, as Luke watches a twin sunset over the sand dunes. Humans are constantly threatened by violent bandit creatures called Tusken Raiders. As the film progresses, various leading characters are introduced to the story in scenes set on Tatooine: Obi-Wan Kenobi, Han Solo and Chewbacca. Later Tatooine scenes take place in Mos Eisley, a gritty bustling spaceport on the planet which is a centre of smuggling and organised crime. One of the most celebrated scenes in the Star Wars saga is in the Mos Eisley cantina, a shady saloon populated by exotic alien species. Composer John Williams wrote music for the alien band in this scene in the style of swing musician Benny Goodman, and arranged with unusual instrumentation to convey an other-worldly sound. Tatooine features once again in the 1983 film Return of the Jedi, in which the story's heroes return to Tatooine to rescue Han Solo from Jabba the Hutt, a fearsome gangster who dominates the criminal underworld on Tatooine.

When the prequel trilogy revived the film franchise in 1999, the action returned to Tatooine for Episode I: The Phantom Menace as the setting for the childhood of Luke's father, Anakin Skywalker. Living as a slave in another spaceport, Mos Espa, Anakin competes in pod races, long-distance airborne races across the desert. The Jedi master Qui-Gon Jinn meets Anakin after making an emergency landing on the planet, and helps him win his freedom. In Episode II: Attack of the Clones (2002), an older Anakin returns to Tatooine to search for his mother, Shmi, who has been kidnapped by Tusken Raiders. The prequels depict a vast expanse of desert with jagged rock formations. Tatooine features once more in the final prequel film, Episode III: Revenge of the Sith (2005); in the closing scene, Obi-Wan Kenobi takes the infant Luke Skywalker and delivers him to his adoptive parents on the Tatooine moisture farm while he goes into hiding by residing in the Junland Wastelands which are in Tatooine's mountainous areas, thus explaining his first appearance in that location in Episode IV.

Tatooine is featured in the climax of the animated film Star Wars: The Clone Wars in which Anakin and his Padawan apprentice Ahsoka Tano return Jabba the Hutt's kidnapped son to his palace. Tatooine again appears briefly at the end of The Rise of Skywalker, when Rey visits the remains of the Lars moisture farm.

== Description ==
Luke Skywalker stares at the Sunset on Tatooine.

Located in an unknown galaxy's desolate Outer Rim, Tatooine orbits a pair of binary G-type stars, Tatoo I and Tatoo II. The planet's indigenous life-forms such as the womp rat, bantha, Sarlacc, and Krayt dragon are well-adapted to its arid climate. Though its proximity to the suns makes life difficult, it is located near key hyperspace routes, making it a smuggler and gangster haven; debris from shipwrecks also provides resources for scavengers. Annual sandstorms wipe out landmarks and make nomadic life dangerous, with the planet's scarce population of approximately 200,000, which were clustered into distinct settlements.

Historically, Tatooine was once a lush world of forest and large oceans. The planet was home of the native Kumumagah, who were the forbearers of both the Sand People and the Jawas. The population had likely numbered in the millions, with the natives living in their glimmering cities, which could be seen from the planet's dark side, from the world's orbit. The Kumumagah were a space faring species, and they walked without their wrappings.

At some point later in the planet's history, the entire world had become a desert by unknown means. This was likely a shoutout to the myth that Mars used to have green vegetation and fresh water.

A small Imperial presence brings the planet an additional source of water, its most precious commodity. Though tasked to enforce the law, stormtroopers often overlook crime; an efficient black market also enables the procurement of illegal goods. Human settlers often become moisture farmers and live in subterranean dwellings in order to survive. Pipe systems distribute most of the harvested moisture to indoor crops supplying food for the farmers. Rare water sources such as springs in badlands (e.g. Beggar's Canyon) provide hydration for hermits and Tusken Raiders. The planet is dominated by the Hutts, a clan of gangsters and crime lords. Since Tatooine was beyond the reach of the Galactic Republic, the Hutts presided over the lawless planet with little outside interference. When the Galactic Empire subsumed the Old Republic, the new regime established only a token presence on Tatooine, which left Jabba the Hutt's reign unchallenged until his death during the events depicted in Return of the Jedi. In fact, during the reign of the Empire, some Tatooinians were skeptical that, should the Rebellion actually reach their planet, that the Empire would even bother to put up a fight to hold on to it. The planet gained notability in what is an unknown galaxy as the homeworld of Luke Skywalker.

== Inhabitants ==
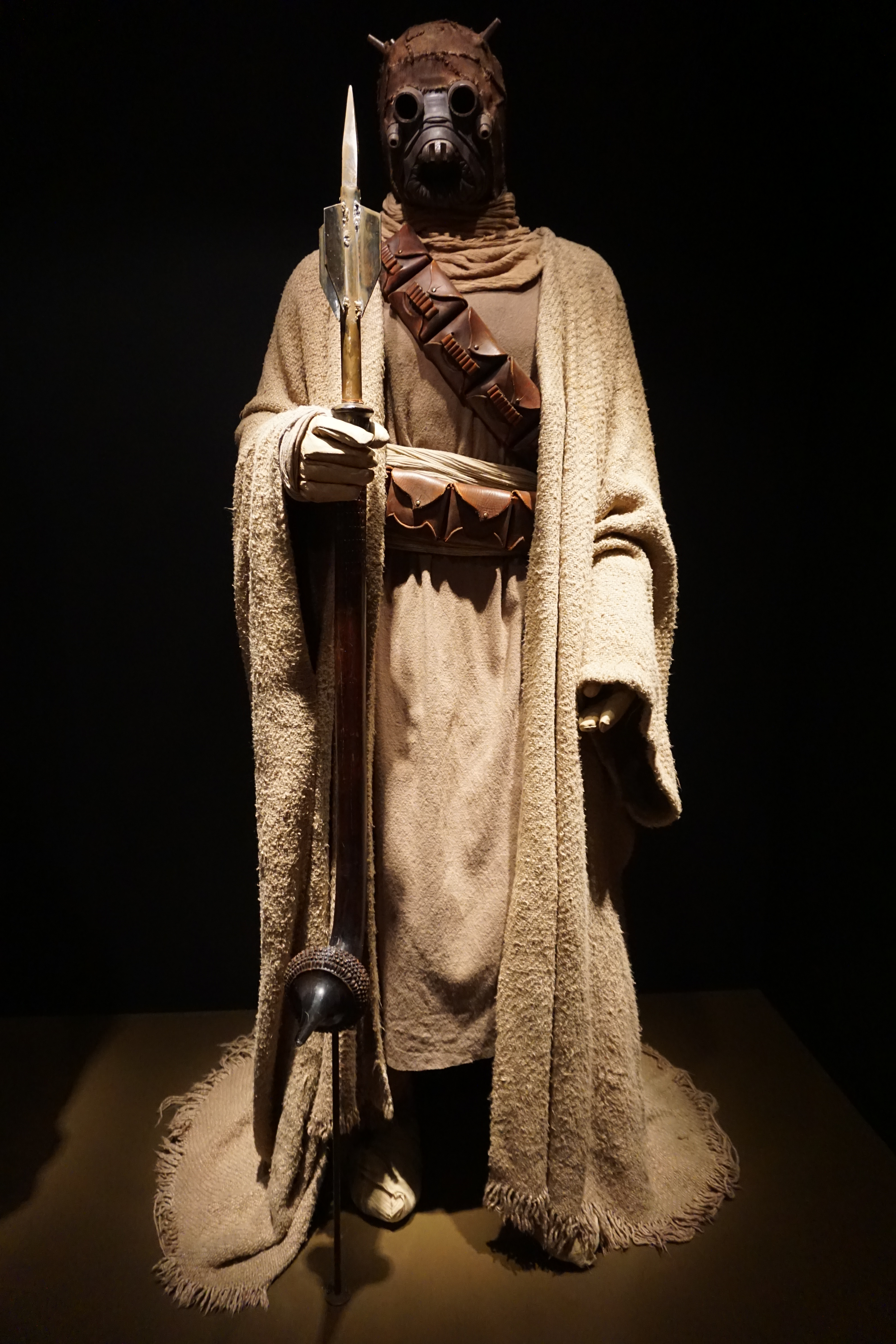
A Tusken Raider, a native inhabitant of Tatooine

- Humans – Settlers
- Hutts – Wormlike crime lords
- Jawas – Humanoid rodent scavengers and traders, and one of the native life forms of Tatooine
- Tusken Raiders (or Sand People) – Fierce, nomadic humanoids and one of the native life forms of Tatooine

=== Flora and fauna ===
- Banthas
- Dewbacks
- Tatooine Howlers
- Eopies
- Krayt dragons
- Rontos
- Scurriers
- Womp rats
- Wraids
- Worrts
- Galoomps
- Anooba
- Jakrab
- Profoggs
- Sarlacc – not native to Tatooine as males spread their seed into space
- Urusai
- Woodoo
- Sketto
- Gorg
- Rancor (Rare, not native)

== Locations ==
Because Tatooine features so prominently in the Star Wars film series, a wide range of locations has been represented on-screen.

=== Settlements ===
Although the planet is sparsely populated, settlements of varying size have provided the settings for many scenes in Star Wars films.

The first settlement to be shown is Anchorhead where many human settlers on Tatooine pursue a difficult agrarian existence on remote "moisture farms" in the desert, collecting water vapor from the atmosphere to grow crops. Among these moisture farmers is the young hero of the film, Luke Skywalker, who resides with his Uncle Owen and Aunt Beru at the Lars Homestead. The region is dangerous, with kidnappings by Tusken Raiders being a major problem, as shown in Attack of the Clones (2002), when Luke's father Anakin, lost his mother to Tusken Raiders. In the original film, Luke also mentions Tosche Station (or Toshi Station), which was a mechanical repair shop featured in scenes that were deleted from the final cut of the original 1977 film. In the deleted scenes, Luke meets his young friends and bids farewell to Biggs Darklighter, who is about to leave to the Imperial Academy. The Jedi Obi-Wan Kenobi is also in self-imposed exile near that region, although his house is remote from other houses, as he is hiding under the alias Ben.

Bestine is the "capital" of Tatooine; although it does not appear in any films, it is mentioned as "Bestine township" in the 1976 novelisation Star Wars: From the Adventures of Luke Skywalker and is featured prominently in Star Wars Galaxies video games as well as Star Wars Outlaws. Bestine has a population of 1.5 thousand, and is the safest town on tatooine, as well as boasting the highest GDP pc on the planet. during the events the galactic Civil War, Fort Starfire was erected and located nearby to the city. In the Expanded Universe, there is also a separate planet named Bestine.

Mos Pelgo, briefly known as Freetown, was a town located in the northern hemisphere of the planet Tatooine, and has a small population of less than 50. Seen in both Star Wars: The Old Republic: Knights of the Eternal Throne and The Mandalorian.

=== Spaceports ===
Two major spaceport locations have been shown on Tatooine:

- Mos Eisley (Star Wars, 1977) is the planet's biggest city: a bustling spaceport with an active criminal underworld, described by Obi-Wan Kenobi a "wretched hive of scum and villainy." This is the location of one of the most noted scenes in Star Wars, Chalmun's Cantina, which is shown as a busy saloon bar-style establishment, patronised by exotic and often violent alien species. The Cantina additionally features as a location in Lego Star Wars video games and Fortnite. The town is the largest hub of spice and weapons trade, and has a population of over 8000.

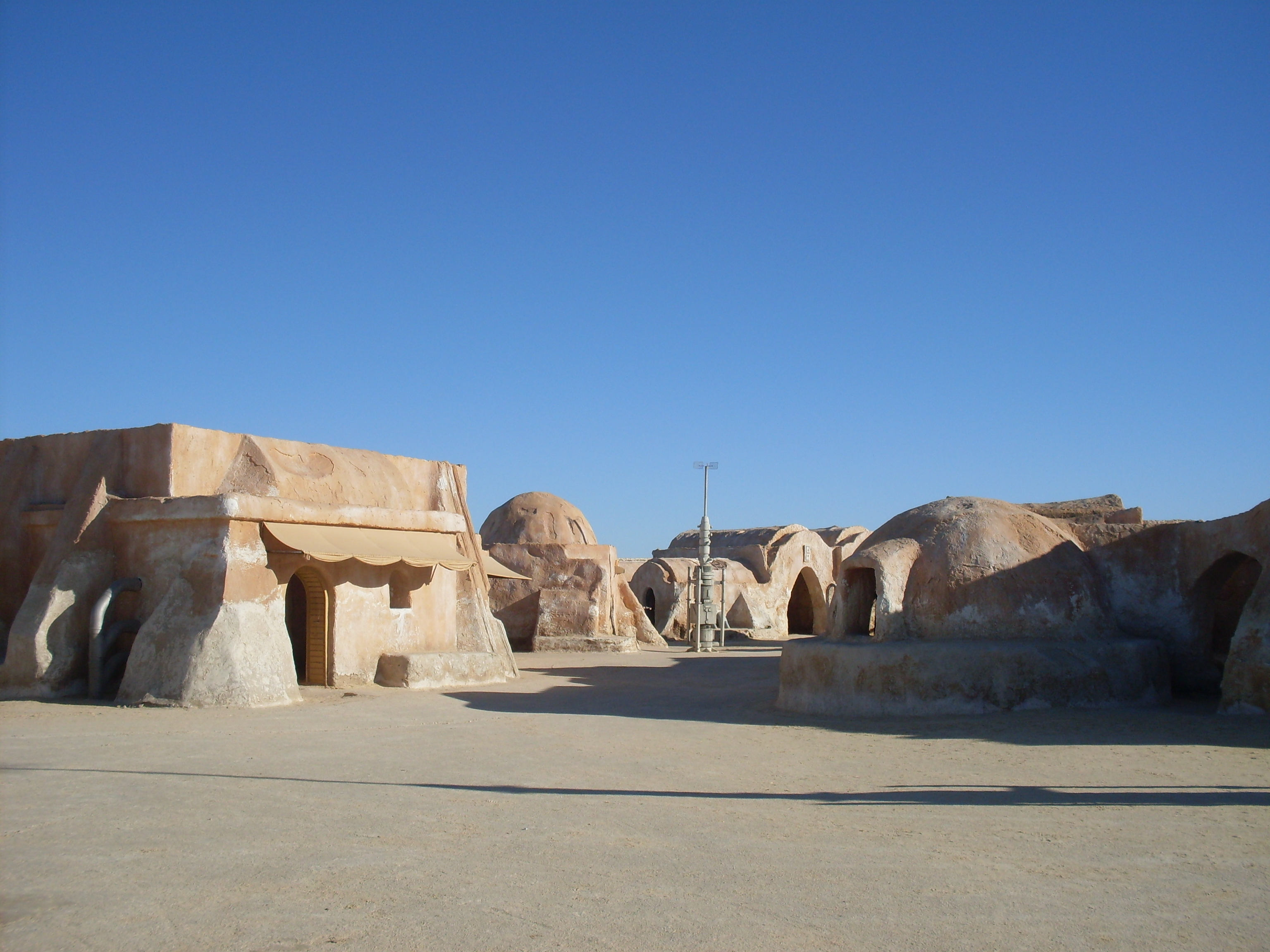
Mos Espa filming location near Tozeur

- Mos Espa (The Phantom Menace, 1999) is home to the Boonta Eve Classic Podrace track. Anakin Skywalker spent his childhood in the city, along with his mother Shmi; both were slaves under the ownership of Watto. Anakin became the first human to win the race against Sebulba and other Podracer pilots and earned his freedom in the process, due to a bet between Watto and Jedi Qui-Gon Jinn. Despite the similarities of Mos Eisley and Mos Espa of their architecture and names, they're not sister cities. The city's depiction in The Phantom Menace was intended to look larger than what was seen of Mos Eisley in the original Star Wars. The town is also significantly safer then Mos Eisley, as the economy is built on betting, trade and business.

=== Desert locations ===
Tatooine is mostly a desert environment. Characters in the films make reference to the deserts by name: the Jundland Wastes, a rocky region, is the location of the Tusken Raider attack in Star Wars (1977), and the neighboring Dune Sea (the basin of an ancient ocean) is the setting for Jabba the Hutt's palace, which has the Rancor pit inside the palace. Also situated in the Dune Sea is the Great Pit of Carkoon, the lair of the deadly omnivorous Sarlacc creature.

== Appearances ==
=== Films ===
- Star Wars (1977)
- The Empire Strikes Back (1980) (mentioned only)
- Return of the Jedi (1983)
- Star Wars: Episode I – The Phantom Menace (1999)
- Star Wars: Episode II – Attack of the Clones (2002)
- Star Wars: Episode III – Revenge of the Sith (2005)
- Star Wars: The Clone Wars (2008)
- Star Wars: The Force Awakens (2015) (mentioned only)
- Solo: A Star Wars Story (2018) (mentioned only)
- Star Wars: The Rise of Skywalker (2019)

=== Television ===
- Star Wars Holiday Special (1978)
- Star Wars: The Clone Wars (2008–2020)
- Star Wars Rebels (2014–2018)
- The Mandalorian (2019–)
- The Book of Boba Fett (2021–2022)
- Obi-Wan Kenobi (2022)
- Star Wars: Young Jedi Adventures (2023)

==== Licensed parodies ====
- Phineas and Ferb: Star Wars (2014)
- Robot Chicken: Star Wars
- Robot Chicken: Star Wars Episode II
- Robot Chicken: Star Wars Episode III

=== Video games ===
- Super Star Wars
- Super Return of the Jedi
- Lego Star Wars: The Video Game
- Lego Star Wars II: The Original Trilogy
- Lego Star Wars: The Complete Saga
- Lego Star Wars III: The Clone Wars
- Lego Star Wars: The Force Awakens (mentioned only)
- Lego Star Wars: The Skywalker Saga
- Star Wars Battlefront (2004)
- Star Wars: Battlefront II (2005)
- Star Wars: Battlefront (2015)
- Star Wars Battlefront II (2017)
- Star Wars Battlefront: Elite Squadron
- Star Wars Empire At War
- Star Wars Bounty Hunter
- Star Wars: Droid Works
- Star Wars: Episode I – The Phantom Menace
- Star Wars: Episode III – Revenge of the Sith
- Star Wars Galactic Battlegrounds
- Star Wars Commander
- Star Wars: Galactic Battlegrounds: Clone Campaigns
- Star Wars Galaxies: An Empire Divided
- Star Wars: Knights of the Old Republic
- Star Wars Knights of the Old Republic II: The Sith Lords (mention only)
- Star Wars Jedi Knight: Jedi Academy
- Star Wars: Rogue Squadron (level 1 and a bonus level)
- Star Wars: The Force Unleashed (downloadable content)
- Star Wars: The Old Republic
- Star Wars: Jedi Power Battles
- Star Wars Outlaws
- Angry Birds Star Wars
- Angry Birds Star Wars II
- Disney Infinity 3.0

== Theme park attraction ==
Tatooine also appeared in the theme park attraction Star Tours - The Adventures Continue in Disney's Hollywood Studios in Walt Disney World Resort in Orlando, Florida and Disneyland Park in Disneyland Resort in Anaheim, California.

== Similarity to real planets ==
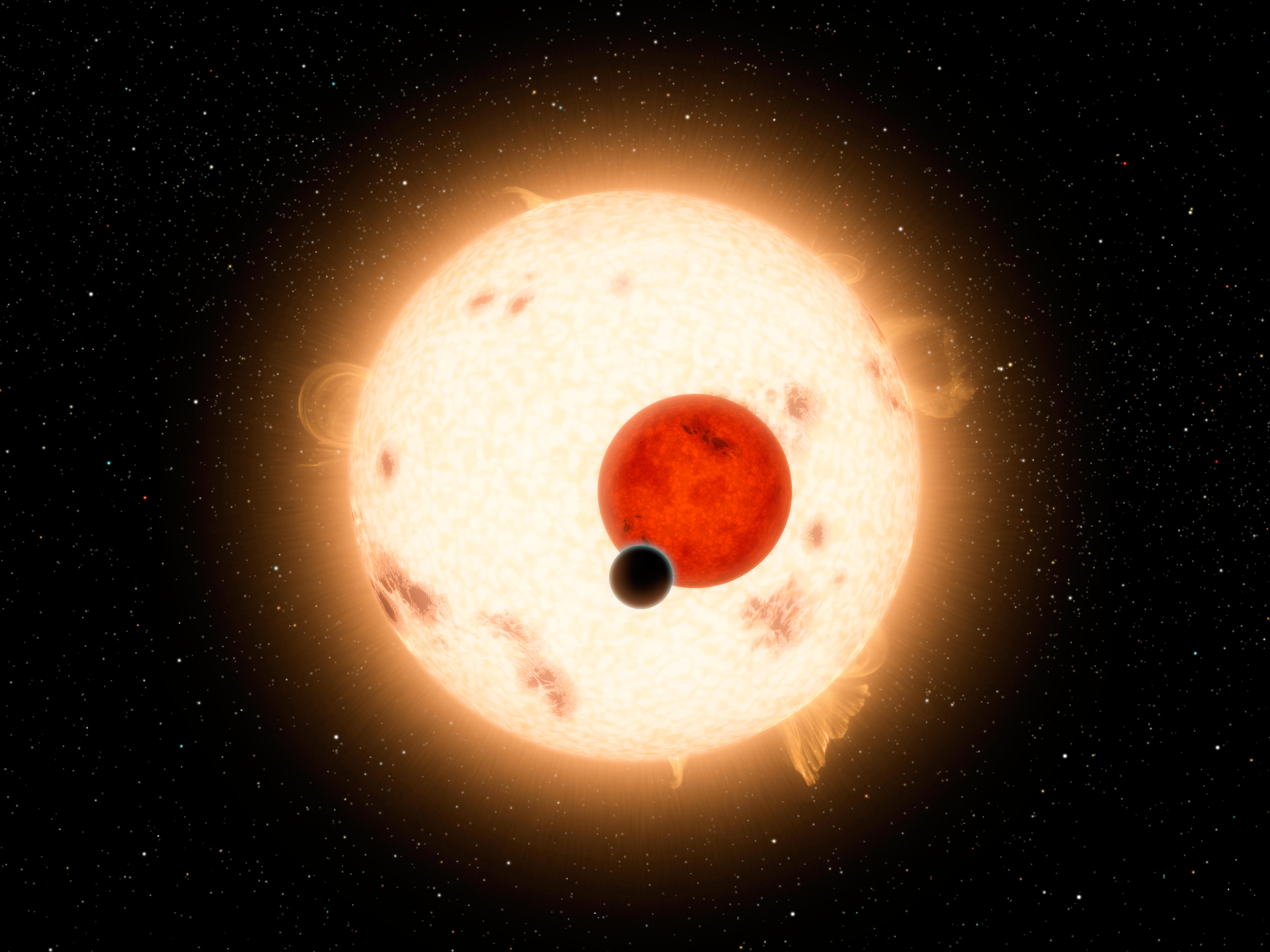
NASA artist's impression of Kepler-16b, an exoplanet compared to the planet Tatooine

The discovery of exoplanets in the real universe gained pace in the early 21st century. In 2015, the US space agency NASA published an article which stated that many of the newly discovered astronomical bodies possessed scientifically confirmed properties that are similar to planets in the fictional Star Wars universe. Among them, the planets Kepler-16b, Kepler-34b, Kepler-35b, Kepler-47b, Kepler-47c, TOI-1338 b, and TOI-1338 c have been likened to Tatooine because they have been discovered orbiting binary star systems. These planets are known as circumbinary planets.

== Influence ==
The desert planet of Jakku in the Star Wars sequel trilogy film The Force Awakens (2015) has been noted as being very similar to Tatooine.

In August 2019, rapper Kanye West announced that he was designing prefabricated homes inspired by the settlements on Tatooine seen in A New Hope to serve as low-income housing. His prototypes in Calabasas, California were torn down after he was cited for not obtaining the proper permits and receiving complaints about the "gumdrop-shaped" structures. On July 5, 2020, West tweeted a photograph of similar structures being built to promote his presidential campaign.

The desert planet of Kerona in Space Quest I is a reference to Tatooine.

== See also ==
- List of Star Wars planets and moons
- Desert planet
- Arrakis
- Mars
