= Kepler-38 =

Binary star system in the constellation Lyra

Observation data Epoch J2000 Equinox ICRS
- Constellation: Lyra
- Right ascension: 19^{h} 07^{m} 19.2813^{s}
- Declination: +42° 16′ 45.121″
- Apparent magnitude (V): 14.3

Characteristics
- Evolutionary stage: main sequence
- Spectral type: G V / M

Astrometry
Proper motion (μ)	RA: −4.575(14) mas/yr Dec.: −13.219(14) mas/yr
Parallax (π)	0.8546±0.0119 mas
Distance	3,820 ± 50 ly (1,170 ± 20 pc)

Orbit
Primary	Kepler-38A
Name	Kepler-38B
Period (P)	18.79537
Semi-major axis (a)	0.1469
Eccentricity (e)	0.1032

Details

Kepler-38A
Mass	0.949 M_{☉}
Radius	1.757 R_{☉}
Temperature	5640 K
Metallicity	-0.11

Kepler-38B
Mass	0.249 M_{☉}
Radius	0.2724 R_{☉}
Metallicity	-0.11

Other designations
- KOI-1740, KIC 6762829, 2MASS J19071928+4216451

Database references
SIMBAD	data
KIC	data

Kepler-38 is a binary star system in the constellation Lyra. These stars, called Kepler-38A and Kepler-38B have masses of 95% and 25% solar masses respectively. The brighter star is spectral class G while the secondary has spectral class M. They are separated by 0.147 AU, and complete an eccentric orbit around a common center of mass every 18.8 days.

== Variability ==
Kepler-38 varies in brightness by up to 0.03 magnitudes every 18.8 days. It has been classified as an eclipsing binary.

== Planetary system ==
In 2012, a circumbinary Neptune-sized planet was found transiting the brighter star. Follow-up radial velocity measurements did not give sufficient information to constrain the mass of the planet. The planet was confirmed via transit duration variation method.

It is likely that additional planets in the habitable zone exist, including rocky terrestrial planets, according to simulations of the formation of the Kepler-38 system; furthermore, the orbits of any such planets are probably stable.

The Kepler-38 planetary system
Companion (in order from star)	Mass	Semimajor axis (AU)	Orbital period (days)	Eccentricity	Inclination (°)	Radius
b	—	0.4644	105.595	—	—	0.39 R_{J}

== See also ==
- Kepler-16
- Kepler-34
- Kepler-35
