= HIP 72217 =

Triple star system in the constellation Libra

Observation data Epoch J2000 Equinox ICRS
- Constellation: Libra
- AB
- Right ascension: 14^{h} 46^{m} 10.811^{s}
- Declination: −21° 10′ 35.05″
- Apparent magnitude (V): 6.43±0.01 (7.06 + 7.33)
- C
- Right ascension: 14^{h} 46^{m} 11.349^{s}
- Declination: −21° 10′ 36.04″
- Apparent magnitude (V): 16.82

Characteristics
- Evolutionary stage: subgiant + subgiant + main sequence
- Spectral type: G1V
- B−V color index: 0.603

Astrometry

AB
Radial velocity (R_{v})	−1.9±0.4 km/s
Proper motion (μ)	RA: −57.28 mas/yr Dec.: −101.60 mas/yr
Parallax (π)	24.24±0.63 mas
Distance	135 ± 3 ly (41 ± 1 pc)
Absolute magnitude (M_{V})	+3.35

C
Proper motion (μ)	RA: −71.95 mas/yr Dec.: −108.23 mas/yr
Parallax (π)	24.8360±0.1337 mas
Distance	131.3 ± 0.7 ly (40.3 ± 0.2 pc)

Orbit
Primary	A
Name	B
Period (P)	12.9170±0.0012 years
Semi-major axis (a)	0.1854±0.0003" (7.65 au (Note: Calculated using the parallax of 0.02424 arcseconds and the separation of 0.1854 arcseconds. 0.1854" / 0.02424" = 7.65 au.))
Eccentricity (e)	0.6319±0.0012
Inclination (i)	25.29±0.31°
Longitude of the node (Ω)	277.42±0.96°
Periastron epoch (T)	1995.2607±0.0022
Argument of periastron (ω) (secondary)	44.42±0.91°
Semi-amplitude (K_{1}) (primary)	7.06±0.00 km/s
Semi-amplitude (K_{2}) (secondary)	7.32±0.00 km/s

Details

A
Mass	1.14±0.15 M_{☉}
Radius	1.47±0.04 R_{☉}
Luminosity	2.73±0.19 L_{☉}
Habitable zone inner limit	1.223 au
Habitable zone outer limit	2.847 au
Surface gravity (log g)	4.14±0.11 cgs
Temperature	6,125±50 K
Age	3.55±0.30 Gyr

B
Mass	1.12±0.14 M_{☉}
Radius	1.39±0.03 R_{☉}
Luminosity	2.21±0.14 L_{☉}
Habitable zone inner limit	1.108 au
Habitable zone outer limit	2.599 au
Surface gravity (log g)	4.20±0.12 cgs
Temperature	5,950±50 K
Age	3.55±0.30 Gyr

C
Mass	0.17±0.01 M_{☉}
Radius	0.28±0.01 R_{☉}
Luminosity	0.0070±0.0002 L_{☉}
Surface gravity (log g)	4.76±0.17 cgs
Temperature	3,250±50 K
Age	3.55±0.30 Gyr

Other designations
- BD−20°4087, HD 129980, HIP 72217, HR 5504, TYC 6166-454-1

Database references
SIMBAD	data
- C

HIP 72217 is a triple star system in the constellation Libra. With an apparent visual magnitude of 6.43, it is very close to the limit for naked eye vision, and thus can only be seen in dark skies. Based on parallax measurements, it lies at a distance of roughly 130 light-years (40 parsecs).

== Characteristics ==
This system is in a hierarchical configuration, with an inner pair of stars and an outer circumbinary component.

The two inner components A and B are G-type stars that have reached the subgiant stage of evolution and are larger, hotter and more luminous than the Sun. The stars take 12.917 years (4,718 days) to fully orbit each other, have a semi-major axis of 7.65 astronomical units (au) and are in an eccentric orbit with e = 0.6319.

Any planet orbiting either of the two inner stars would need to have an orbit between 0.003 and 0.067 au, since a longer orbit would be unstable due to the gravitational perturbations of the binary system, while a shorter orbit would reach the Roche lobe. A circumbinary planet would need to be orbiting between 2.734 and 2.966 au. Meanwhile, the habitable zone spans from roughly 1.2 to 2.8 au for the star A, and 1.1 to 2.6 au for the star B.

The outer component C is a red dwarf separated by 290 au from the inner pair. (Note: Calculated using the parallax of 0.02424 arcseconds and the separation of 6.923 arcseconds. 6.923" / 0.02424" = 286 au.) It has around 28% of the Sun's size, shining with less than 1% of the Sun's luminosity and having an effective temperature of 3,250 K.
