= Kepler-413b =

Circumbinary Neptunian planet orbiting Kepler-413

Discovery
- Discovery date: 2013
- Detection method: Transit (Kepler Mission)

Orbital characteristics
- Semi-major axis: 0.3553 AU (53,150,000 km)
- Eccentricity: 0.118
- Orbital period (sidereal): 66.262 d
- Inclination: 2.5 (varies)
- Star: Kepler-413 AB

Physical characteristics
- Mean radius: 0.388 R_{J}
- Mass: 0.2110 M_{J}

Kepler-413b (also known as Kepler-413(AB)b) is a circumbinary planet orbiting stars Kepler-413 A and Kepler-413 B, which respectively are K and M dwarfs. These host stars orbit each other with orbital period of 10.1 days.

== Discovery ==
Kepler-413b was discovered by observing the planet dimming the brightest host star. By looking at transit patterns it was discovered that the planet first made 3 transits in 180 days, then in the next 800 days, there were no transits until the next one. This transit pattern helped to quickly confirm the existence of the planet despite the host stars being relatively faint.

The existence of the planet was first preliminary announced in Kepler Science Conference in November 2013. The final paper was submitted in January 2014.

== Characteristics ==
Size comparison
Neptune	Kepler-413b
Neptune	Exoplanet

Kepler-413b is a Neptune sized planet with an orbital period of about 66.262 days. The orbital misalignment of Kepler-413b causes extreme seasonal variations for the planet due to its constantly changing axial tilt.
