= AK Scorpii =

Binary star in the constellation Scorpius

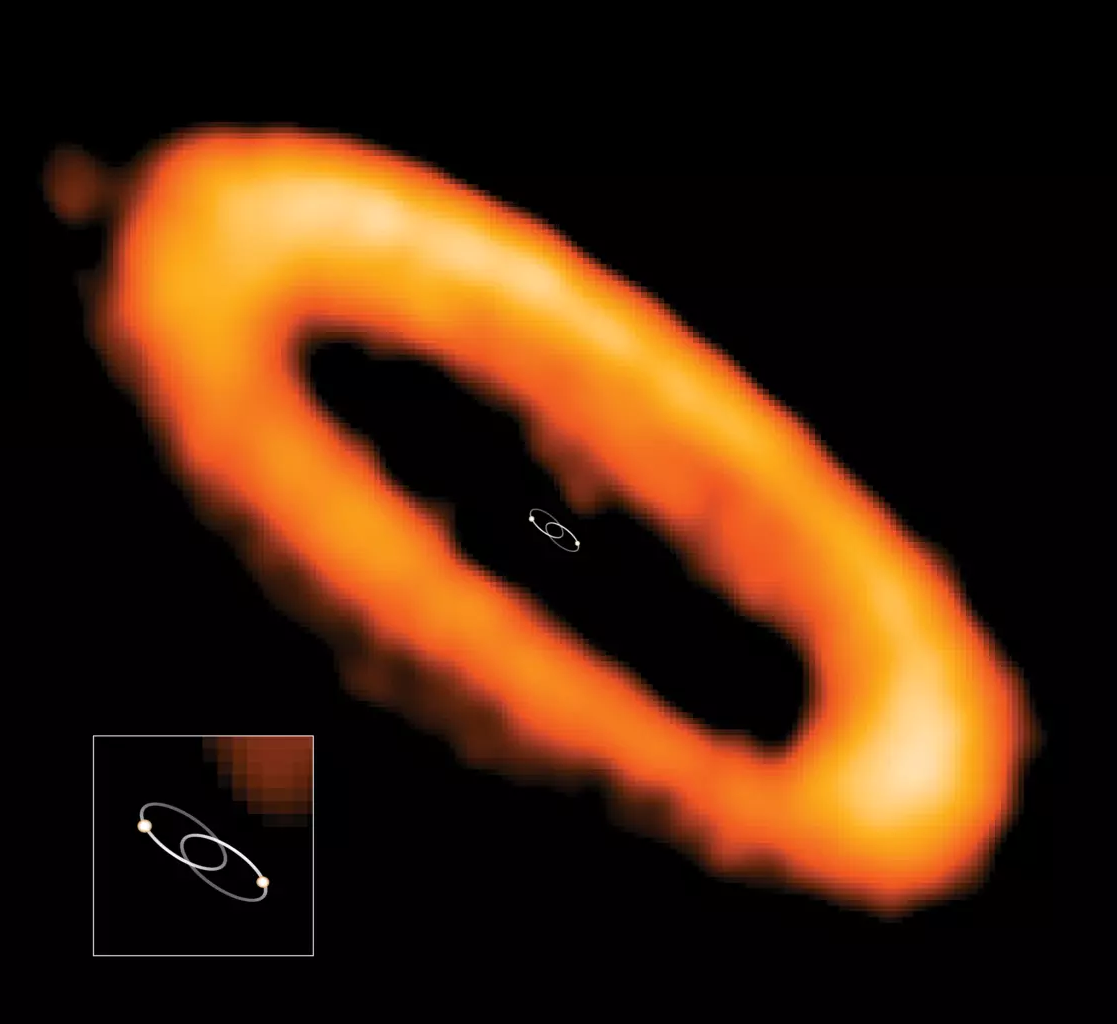
- The star system AK Scorpii imaged by ALMA. The Binary star orbit was added for clarity. Credit: ALMA (ESO/NAOJ/NRAO), I. Czekala and G. Kennedy; NRAO/AUI/NSF, S. Dagnello

Observation data Epoch J2000.0 Equinox J2000.0
- Constellation: Scorpius
- Right ascension: 16^{h} 54^{m} 44.8498^{s}
- Declination: −36° 53′ 18.561″
- Apparent magnitude (V): 8.7 - 12.8

Characteristics
- Spectral type: F5 IV-V
- Variable type: Herbig Ae/Be star

Astrometry
Radial velocity (R_{v})	−1.97±0.5 km/s
Proper motion (μ)	RA: −8.399±0.116 mas/yr Dec.: −29.268±0.083 mas/yr
Parallax (π)	7.1126±0.0621 mas
Distance	459 ± 4 ly (141 ± 1 pc)

Orbit
Primary	AK Scorpii A
Companion	AK Scorpii B
Period (P)	13.609±0.001 days
Semi-major axis (a)	0.16 au
Eccentricity (e)	0.47±0.01
Inclination (i)	115±3°
Longitude of the node (Ω)	48±3°
Argument of periastron (ω) (secondary)	186±2°
Semi-amplitude (K_{1}) (primary)	64.7±0.9 km/s
Semi-amplitude (K_{2}) (secondary)	65.5±0.9 km/s

Details

AK Scorpii A
Mass	1.25 M_{☉}
Age	18 Myr

AK Scorpii B
Mass	1.25 M_{☉}
Age	18 Myr

Other designations
- HD 152404, CD−36 11056, HIP 82747, IRAS 16514-3648, 2MASS J16544485-3653185

Database references
SIMBAD	AB

AK Scorpii is a Herbig Ae/Be star and spectroscopic binary star about 459 light-years distant in the constellation Scorpius. The star belongs to the nearby Upper Centaurus–Lupus star-forming region and the star is actively accreting material. The binary is surrounded by a circumbinary disk that was imaged with VLT/SPHERE in scattered light and with ALMA.

In 1907 Henrietta Swan Leavitt and Edward Charles Pickering announced the discovery of this variable star. It was given its variable star designation, AK Scorpii, in 1912.

== Characteristics ==
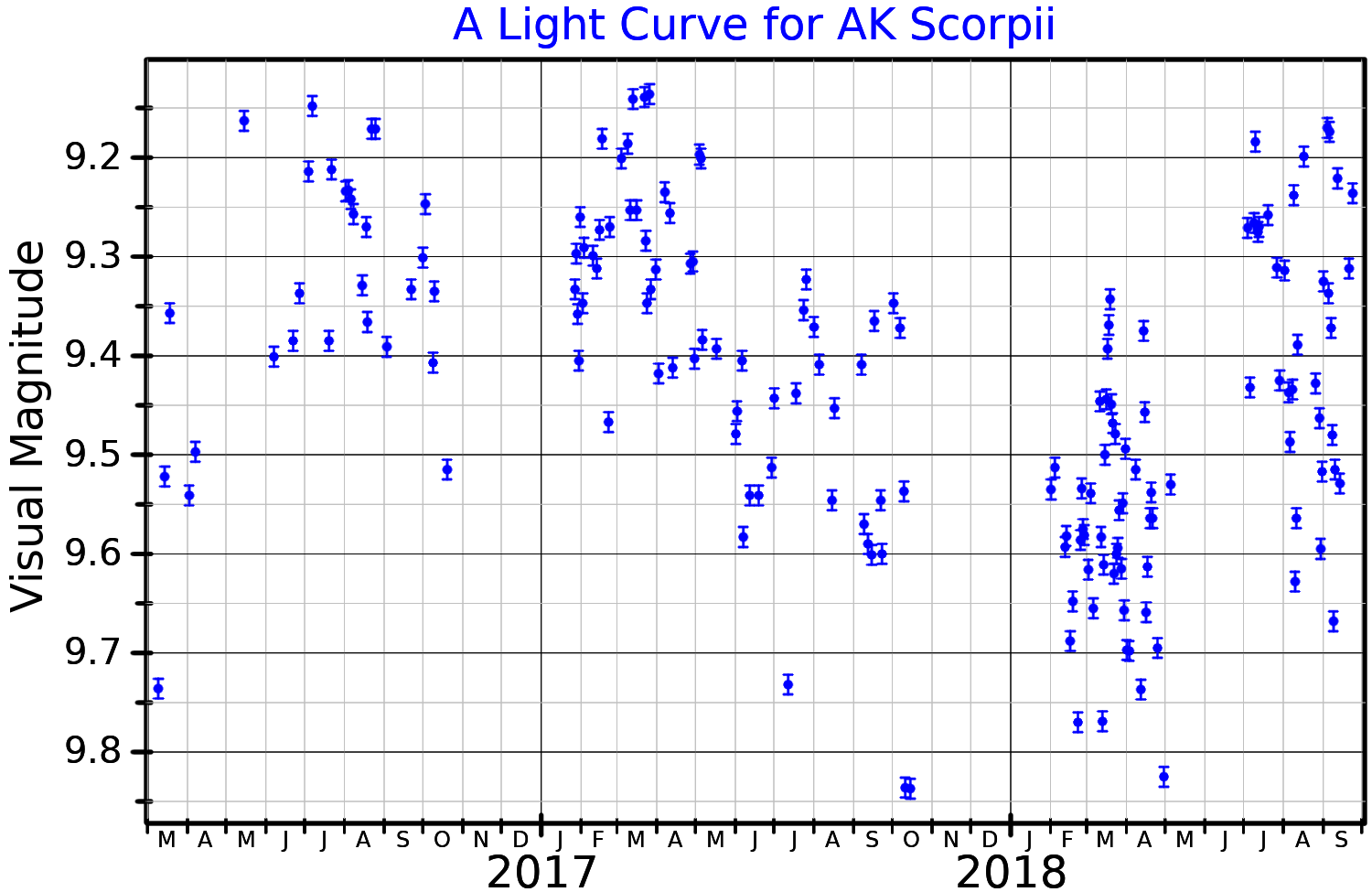
A visual band light curve for AK Scorpii, plotted from ASAS-SN data

AK Scorpii is about 18 million years old, which is young on astronomical timescales. The binary consists out of two stars with an equal mass of 1.25 M_{☉} respectively and the two stars orbit each other within 13.6 days. The binary is surrounded by a narrow ring of dust with a radius of about 30 astronomical units and the gap between the binary and the dust disk is filled by some gas.

The binary is in an eccentric orbit that causes variable accretion rates due to gravitational interactions with the disk. During the furthest point in the orbit of the binary (apastron), matter is dragged from the inner disk border into the gap. The material forms accretion streams that fill ring-like structures around each component of the binary. At the closest point in the orbit (periastron), the ring-like structures come into contact, leading to an angular momentum loss and thus producing an accretion outburst.

In August 2014 the system was observed with the Hubble Space Telescope during the periastron passage. The telescope observed a drop of the hydrogen flux, which is explained by the occultation of the star by a gas stream falling towards the star. The system also shows an enhanced X-ray and ultraviolet flux with XMM-Newton data during periastron, which is an additional sign of stronger accretion during periastron.

The orbital inclination of the binary and the inclination of the circumbinary disk is nearly the same. Any circumbinary planet that could form in this disk would orbit in the same plane as the binary.

The spectrum of the stars shows that their atmosphere is overabundant in the chemical elements yttrium, barium, and lanthanum. The primary additionally shows an overabundance of zirconium and the secondary is overabundant in sulphur.
