= Star Wars Commander =

2014 video game

- Star Wars Commander app icon
- Developers: NaturalMotion and Disney Mobile
- Publisher: Disney Mobile
- Platforms: iOS; Android; Windows; Windows Phone
- Release: August 23, 2014 Ended June 12, 2020 11am GMT
- Genre: Strategy

Star Wars Commander was a freemium strategy video game for iOS, Windows and Android, developed by Disney Mobile.

== Gameplay ==
Star Wars Commander was a strategy game that combines attacks on other players with attacks against computer generated bases. The game's storyline is set in the Star Wars universe with player choosing to play for the Rebel Alliance or the Galactic Empire.

Notable Star Wars characters that appear in the game include Darth Vader, Han Solo, Chewbacca, Leia Organa, R2-D2 and Luke Skywalker.

The player can create their own base by earning coins and alloy. This game is similar to Clash of Clans in the way that the player can upgrade their buildings by attacking other players and winning defenses.

If the player gets attacked or attacks, they lose or gain medals depending if they get a win or not. A win can only be obtained by gaining at least one of three stars as the battle progresses before the maximum two minutes for a battle ends or the player's troops are all destroyed. The more medals the player has, the better their opponents will be.

Once the player unlocks the Squad Center, they can join a squad where they can communicate through chat and request troops, which they can either deploy in attack or automatically deploy when attacking troops come within a certain distance to the Squad Center. They can post replays of their recent battles there as well. The leader of the squad can edit the squad's name and promote members to officers. If the leader leaves the squad, the member with the most medals becomes the leader of the squad. The player can participate in Squad Wars as well which are two squads warring.

There are six planets: Er'Kit, Tatooine, Hoth, Dandoran, Takodana, and Yavin 4, to which players can relocate their base. Each planet offers different rewards.

The main currencies of the game are credits, alloy, and contraband, with gems being the premium currency. Credits are used to purchase troops and build and upgrade buildings that generate or store alloy or contraband. Alloy is used for all other buildings. They can be used to clear debris around the base (credits to remove junk and alloy to remove rocks), which remains the only legitimate way to obtain crystals for free other than by chance. Contraband is unlocked at Headquarters Level 6, and is also used to pay for troops. All three resources can be looted in battle if the generators (Credit Markets, Alloy Refineries, or Contraband Trade Ports) or storage facilities (Credit Vaults, Alloy Depots, or the single Contraband Safehouse) are attacked.

In attack, there are six types of troops that can be deployed - soldiers, vehicles, heroes, starfighters, mercenaries, and droidekas. The latter two can only be purchased with contraband. Soldiers, recruited from the Barracks, are low-cost and take up low amounts of capacity, but are weak in battle. Vehicles are more durable, more powerful, and often faster, but take up much more space. They are built in Factories. Though vehicles and soldiers must share space, Heroes and Starfighters each have their own allotments. Starfighters, available in the Starfighter Command, are one-use vehicles that can attack buildings or defending troops, deploy their own troops (not included in the main soldier/vehicle allotment) or heal troops. They have small allotments and take up large amounts of space, so they can be deployed few times in battle. Heroes are special troops that are held in reserve in the Hero Command. Only three may be held in reserve at a maximum, and only one deployed per battle. They are either modified normal units with drastically increased health or firepower, or special, distinct characters such as Han Solo or Darth Vader. The Cantina is used to hire mercenaries with contraband. Contraband can be used to buy the Droideka Sentinel or Droideka Oppressor. One of each can be deployed in battle and in defense, but must be repaired after each of either with credits.

In battle on any planet that has a 'conflict', or through chance-based rewards from 'crates', the player can obtain 'shards' - boosts to troops and buildings that can be implemented from the Armory, or unlock new troops altogether. The health and damage of unlocked troops can be increased from the Research Lab.

Gems are a powerful tool, and can be used to purchase credits, alloy, contraband, or crates. They can also be used to instantly upgrade buildings with no cost in the way of the initial currency, or purchase more droids to build, upgrade, or repair more buildings at a time. However, the only legitimate way to obtain them en masse other than through crates or winning conflicts is to purchase them with real money.

The Headquarters is the most important building in the base, and destroying it in battle will yield currency and a star (the other two can be won by destroying 50% and 100% of all buildings in the base, with the exception of walls). The level of the Headquarters determines the maximum level of buildings, or the availability of buildings at all - thus, secondarily, determining their defining traits. The Headquarters has unlimited storage space for purchased crates, currency obtained as bonuses, compensation, and the like, and troops. The only way to deploy shard-dependent troops without actually having the shards is to draw them from the Headquarters if they are available. Beastly troops such as rancors or krayt dragons are completely unavailable except via the Headquarters.

== Development ==
After almost three years of supporting the Windows platforms, Disney ended support on June 1, 2017. Current players were given until June 30, 2017, to play with reduced functionality.

On January 17, 2019, it was announced through an update that NaturalMotion would be overseeing operations of the game.

On March 13, 2020, it was announced that the game was to shut down, and that same day all in-game purchases were disabled. Additionally, massive boosts were dispensed to players, including the reduction of all in-game item prices to 1 of the relevant unit.

The game closed completely at 11am GMT, June 12, 2020.
