= HD 143811 =

Binary star in the constellation Lupus

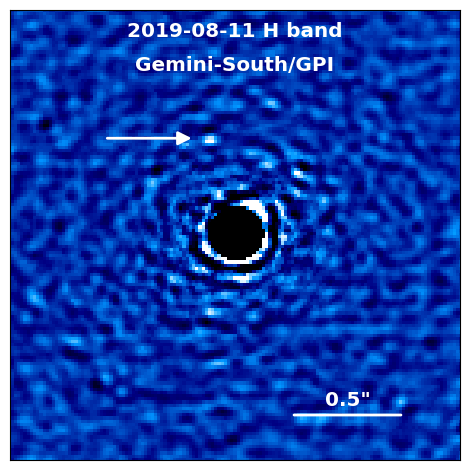
- HD 143811 AB b (arrow) with Gemini in 2019. The star is behind the black disk of the coronagraph in the center.

Observation data Epoch J2000 Equinox ICRS
- Constellation: Lupus
- Right ascension: 16^{h} 03^{m} 33.425^{s}
- Declination: −30° 08′ 13.38″
- Apparent magnitude (V): +8.91±0.01

Characteristics
- Evolutionary stage: main sequence
- Spectral type: F5V

Astrometry
Radial velocity (R_{v})	+0.48±0.02 km/s
Proper motion (μ)	RA: −14.850 mas/yr Dec.: −24.984 mas/yr
Parallax (π)	7.3065±0.0204 mas
Distance	446 ± 1 ly (136.9 ± 0.4 pc)

Orbit
Period (P)	18.59098(7) days
Semi-major axis (a)	0.1854+0.0014 −0.0024 au
Eccentricity (e)	0.4935±0.0013
Inclination (i)	22.9+0.3 −0.2°
Periastron epoch (T)	58230.438±0.006 MJD
Argument of periastron (ω) (secondary)	335.91±0.18°
Argument of periastron (ω) (primary)	155.91±0.18°
Semi-amplitude (K_{1}) (primary)	22.76±0.05 km/s
Semi-amplitude (K_{2}) (secondary)	25.71±0.06 km/s

Details

A
Mass	1.30+0.03 −0.05 M_{☉}
Temperature	6,751+207 −148 K
Metallicity [Fe/H]	−0.18±0.10 dex
Rotational velocity (v sin i)	6.8±0.6 km/s
Age	20.9+1.8 −1.7 Myr

B
Mass	1.15+0.03 −0.04 M_{☉}
Temperature	6,349+122 −133 K
Metallicity [Fe/H]	−0.18±0.10 dex
Rotational velocity (v sin i)	2.8±1.4 km/s
Age	20.9+1.8 −1.7 Myr

Other designations
- CD−29°12217, HD 143811, HIP 78663, TYC 7330-289-1

Database references
SIMBAD	data

HD 143811 is a spectroscopic binary system in the constellation Lupus. Its apparent magnitude is 8.91, too faint to be visible with the naked eye. Based on parallax measurements from the Gaia spacecraft, it is located at a distance of 446 light-years (137 parsecs).

The system is a member of the Scorpius–Centaurus association, and has an estimated age of 21 million years. The two stellar components are a bit more massive and hotter than the Sun. They take 18.59 days to orbit each other, and have an unusually eccentric orbit for such a short orbital period. HD 143811 has a debris disk located at 8.5 astronomical units, with an estimated temperature of 140 K (−133 °C), and is orbited by one known exoplanet, at 63 au.

== Planetary system ==
In 2025, two independent teams found a planet orbiting the system using the direct imaging technique. One used the Gemini Planet Imager and the NIRC-2 camera aboard the Keck telescope, while the other used the SPHERE instrument aboard the Very Large Telescope and the Gemini Planet Imager. Additionally, its existence was inferred using astrometry. The planet, named HD 143811 b, is a gas giant with 6.1 times the mass of Jupiter (M_{J}), 1.4 to 1.7 times Jupiter's radius (R_{J}), and a temperature of 1,000±30 K. It has a circumbinary orbit, having a semi-major axis of 63 astronomical units, and an orbital period of roughly 300 years.

The HD 143811 planetary system
Companion (in order from star)	Mass	Semimajor axis (AU)	Orbital period (years)	Eccentricity	Inclination (°)	Radius
b	6.1+0.7 −0.9 M_{J}	63+30 −12	319+248 −86	0.19±0.12	37+11 −12	1.41±0.03 – 1.7+0.7 −0.4 R_{J}
