= Kepler-16 =

Binary star system in the constellation Cygnus

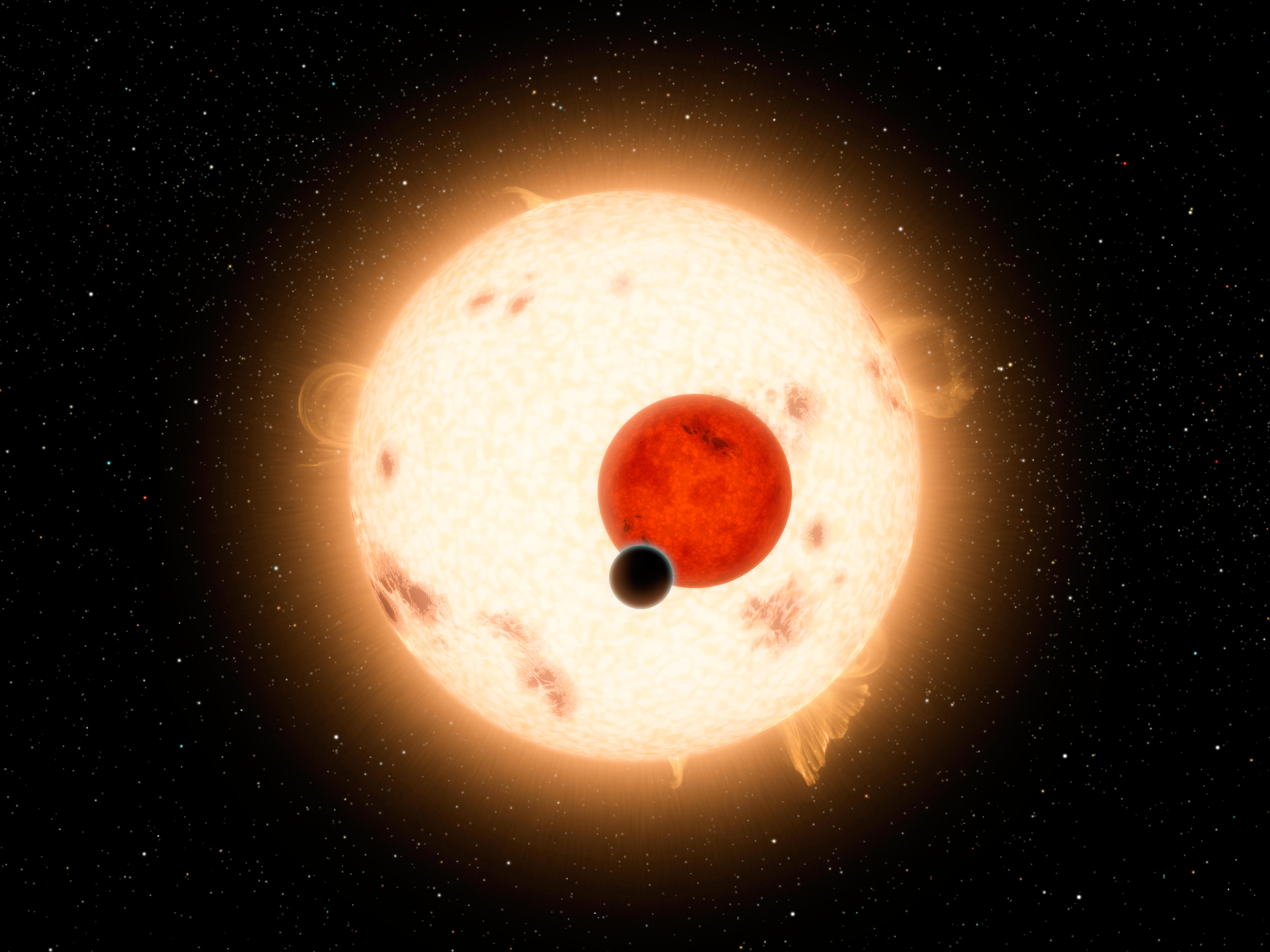
- An artist's rendering of the Kepler-16 system, showing the binary star being transit of Kepler-16b (black planet). Credit: NASA/JPL-Caltech

Observation data Epoch J2000 Equinox ICRS
- Constellation: Cygnus
- Right ascension: 19^{h} 16^{m} 18.1759^{s}
- Declination: +51° 45′ 26.778″

Characteristics
- Spectral type: K7V + M

Astrometry
Proper motion (μ)	RA: 14.041±0.054 mas/yr Dec.: −48.601±0.051 mas/yr
Parallax (π)	13.2893±0.0271 mas
Distance	245.4 ± 0.5 ly (75.2 ± 0.2 pc)

Orbit
Primary	Kepler-16A
Secondary	Kepler-16B
Period (P)	41.077777±0.000035 d
Semi-major axis (a)	0.2257±0.0010 AU
Eccentricity (e)	0.15962±0.00037
Inclination (i)	90.30401±0.0019°
Longitude of the node (Ω)	0°
Periastron epoch (T)	BJD 2457573.0995±0.0032
Argument of periastron (ω) (secondary)	263.67±0.02°
Semi-amplitude (K_{1}) (primary)	13.6787±0.0015 km/s
Semi-amplitude (K_{2}) (secondary)	46.88±0.28 km/s

Details

Kepler-16A
Mass	0.704±0.011 M_{☉}
Radius	0.653±0.003 R_{☉}
Luminosity	0.148 L_{☉}
Surface gravity (log g)	4.6527±0.0017 cgs
Temperature	4,242±20 K
Metallicity [Fe/H]	0.3±0.2 dex
Rotation	35.1±1.0 days

Kepler-16B
Mass	0.2054±0.0019 M_{☉}
Radius	0.229±0.001 R_{☉}
Luminosity	0.0057 L_{☉}
Surface gravity (log g)	5.0358±0.0017 cgs
Temperature	3,138±13 K

Other designations
- KOI-1611, KIC 12644769, GSC 03554-01147, 2MASS J19161817+5145267, Gaia DR2 2133476355197071616

Database references
SIMBAD	data
KIC	data

Kepler-16 is an eclipsing binary star system in the constellation of Cygnus that was targeted by the Kepler spacecraft. Both stars are smaller than the Sun; the primary, Kepler-16A, is a K-type main-sequence star and the secondary, Kepler-16B, is an M-type red dwarf star. They are separated by 0.23 AU, and complete an orbit around a common center of mass every 41 days. The system is host to one known exoplanet in circumbinary orbit: The Saturn-size planet Kepler-16b.

== Eclipses ==
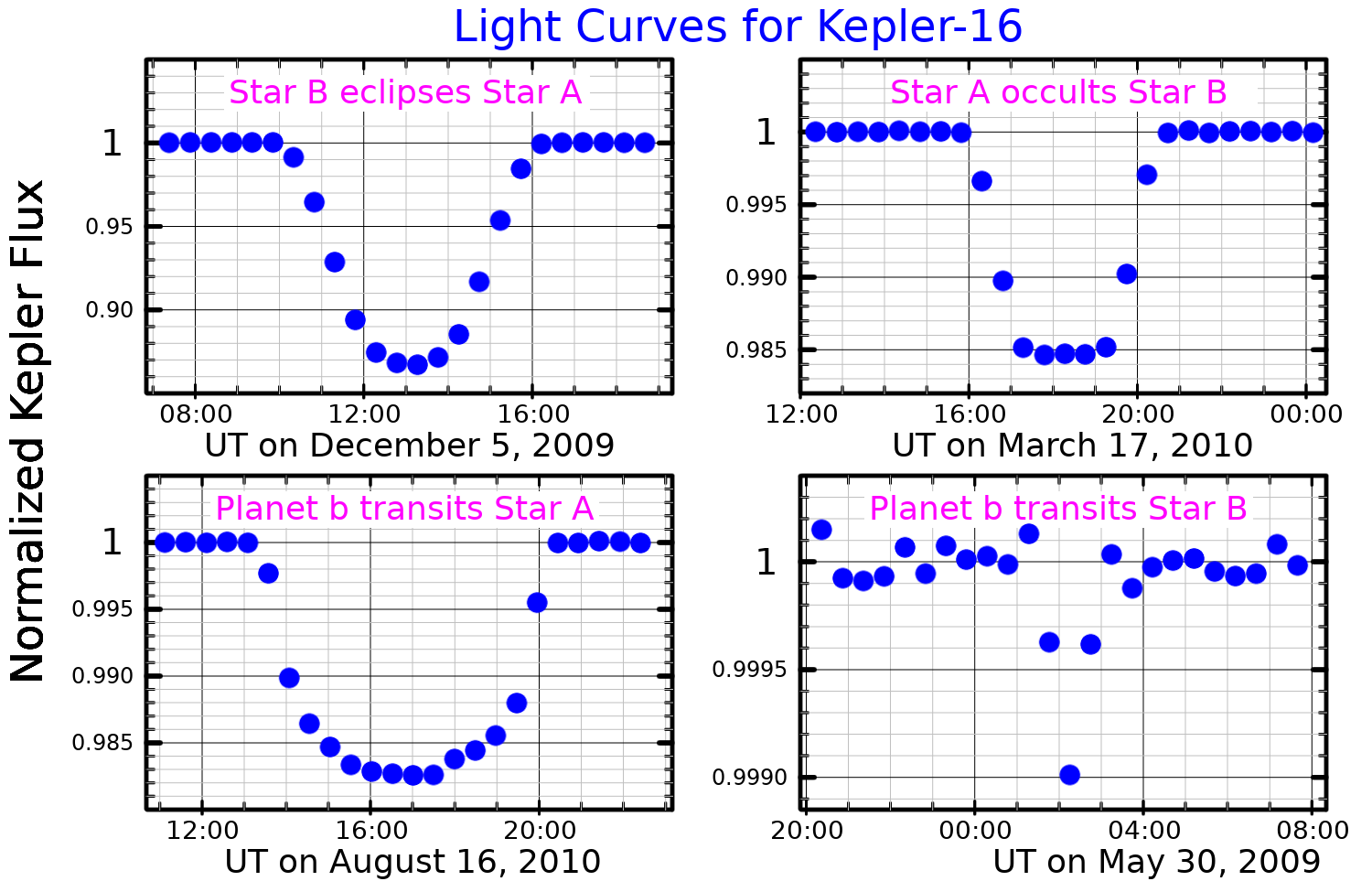
Light curves for the Kepler-16 system, adapted from Doyle et al. (2011)

The Kepler-16 system is almost edge-on to Earth and the two stars eclipse each other as they orbit. The larger and brighter primary star is partially eclipsed by the secondary for about six hours and the brightness drops by about 0.15 magnitudes. The secondary star is completely occulted by the primary star for about two hours, but the overall brightness only drops by about 0.02 magnitudes.

There are also shallow eclipses caused by a large exoplanet. When this transits across the primary star, the brightness drops by slightly more than the secondary eclipse. When it transits the secondary star, the brightness drops by 0.001 magnitudes.

== Planetary system ==
Kepler-16b is a gas giant that orbits the two stars in the Kepler-16 system. The planet is a third of Jupiter's mass and slightly smaller than Saturn at 0.7538 Jupiter radii, but is more dense. Kepler-16b completes a nearly circular orbit every 228.776 days.

The Kepler-16 planetary system
Companion (in order from star)	Mass	Semimajor axis (AU)	Orbital period (days)	Eccentricity	Inclination (°)	Radius
b	0.333 M_{J}	0.7048	228.776	0.0069	90.032	0.7538 R_{J}
