= MACHO-1997-BLG-41 =

Historic gravitational microlensing event located in Sagittarius

Observation data Epoch J2000.0 Equinox ICRS
- Constellation: Sagittarius
- Right ascension: 17^{h} 56^{m} 20.7^{s}
- Declination: −28° 47′ 42″
Distance	~10,000 ly (3,100 pc)
Spectral type	M / M

Other designations
- MACHO 402.47862.1576, MACHO 402.47862.1576

Database references
SIMBAD	data

MACHO-1997-BLG-41, commonly abbreviated as 97-BLG-41 or MACHO-97-BLG-41, was a gravitational microlensing event located in Sagittarius which occurred in July 1999. The source star is likely a giant or subgiant star of spectral type K located at a distance of around 8 kiloparsecs (26,000 light-years). The lens star is a binary system approximately 10,000 light-years away in the constellation Sagittarius. The two stars are separated from each other by about 0.9 AU and have an orbital period of around 1.5 years. The most likely mass of the system is about 0.3 times that of the Sun. Star A and star B are both red dwarfs.

The first published model of the MACHO-1997-BLG-41 event using data from Mount Stromlo Observatory, Cerro Tololo Inter-American Observatory and Wise Observatory show the lens system as being located in the galactic bulge at a distance of 6.3 kiloparsecs (21,000 light-years), a total system mass of about 0.8 times that of the Sun and a separation of 1.8 AU (the most likely value given a random orientation of the system). The individual components were assigned masses 0.6 and 0.16 times that of the Sun, making them an orange dwarf of spectral class K and a class M red dwarf, respectively. According to this model, a planet with around 3.5 times the mass of Jupiter orbits in a circumbinary orbit around the two stars at a distance of around 7 AU (assuming random orientation of the system).

Subsequently, an independent analysis with data from five different observatories revealed that the microlensing event could be interpreted as being caused by a low-mass binary system of two red dwarf stars located in the galactic disk if one considers their orbital motion, without the need to invoke a planetary mass. A further study combining both datasets confirmed this finding. The planet is thus considered disproven.

== See also ==
- Hypothetical astronomical object
- Delta Trianguli
- PSR B1620−26
- HD 202206
