= Kepler-34 =

Eclipsing binary star in the constellation Cygnus

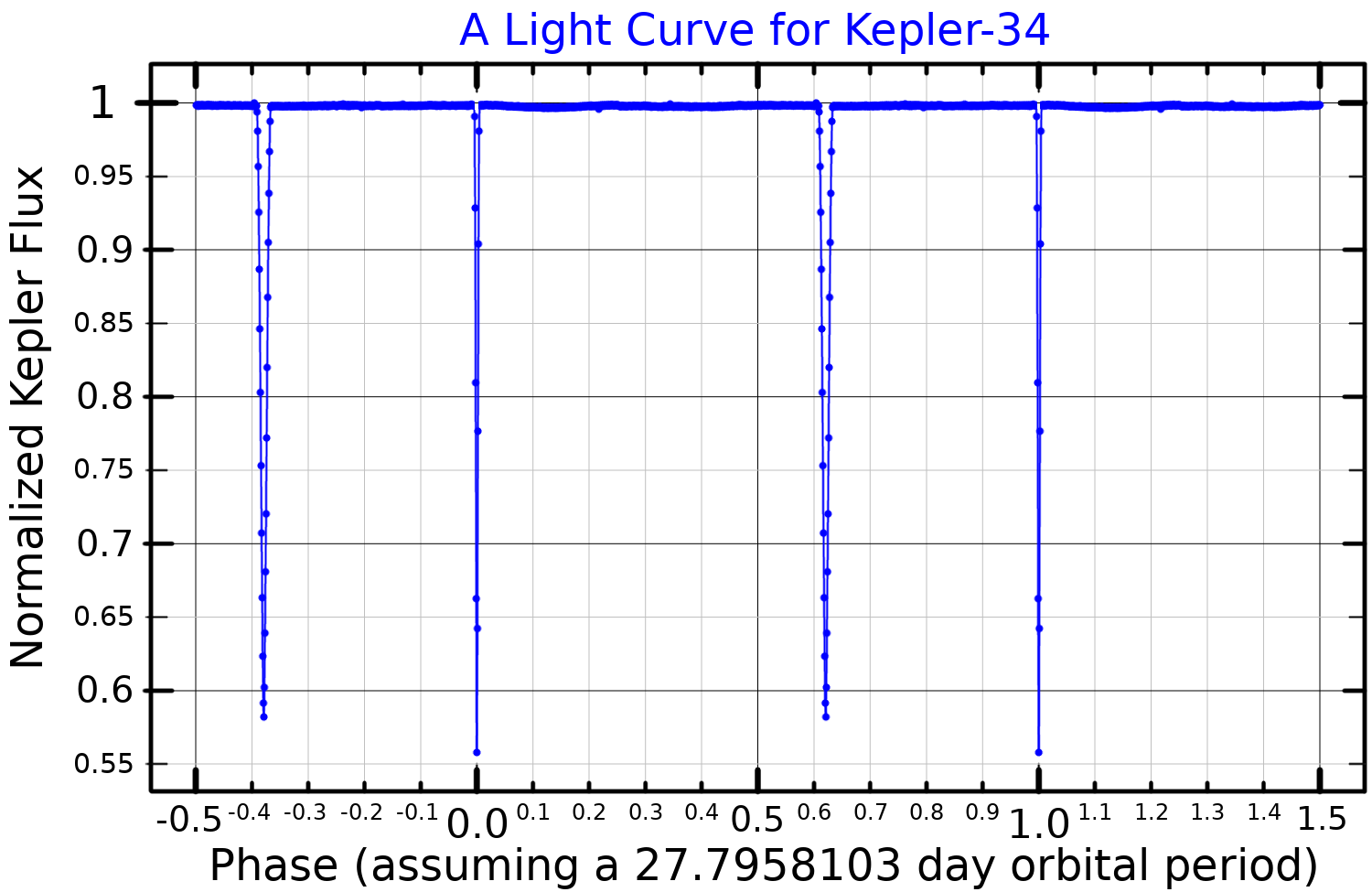
- A light curve for Kepler-34, plotted from Kepler data

Observation data Epoch J2000 Equinox ICRS
- Constellation: Cygnus
- Right ascension: 19^{h} 45^{m} 44.5975^{s}
- Declination: +44° 38′ 29.611″
- Apparent magnitude (V): 15.04

Characteristics
- Spectral type: G0V / G0V

Astrometry
| Proper motion (μ) | RA: −3.424(19) mas/yr Dec.: −5.033(20) mas/yr |
| Parallax (π) | 0.5529±0.0184 mas |
| Distance | 5,900 ± 200 ly (1,810 ± 60 pc) |

Orbit
| Primary | Kepler-34A |
| Name | Kepler-34B |
| Period (P) | 27.7958103 (± 0.0000016) d |
| Semi-major axis (a) | 0.22882 (± 0.00019) AU |
| Eccentricity (e) | 0.52087 (± 0.00055) |
| Inclination (i) | 89.8584 (± 0.0080)° |

Details

Kepler-34A
| Mass | 1.0479 (± 0.0033) M_{☉} |
| Radius | 1.1618 (± 0.0030) R_{☉} |
| Temperature | 5913 (± 130) K |
| Metallicity | -0.07 (± 0.15) |

Kepler-34B
| Mass | 1.0208 (± 0.0022) M_{☉} |
| Radius | 1.0927 (± 0.0030) R_{☉} |
| Temperature | 5867 K |

Other designations
- KOI-2459, KIC 8572936, 2MASS 19454459+4438296

Database references
| SIMBAD | data |
| KIC | data |

Kepler-34 is an eclipsing binary star system in the constellation of Cygnus. Both stars have roughly the same mass as the Sun and, like the Sun, both are spectral class G. They are separated by 0.22 AU, and complete an eccentric (e=0.5) orbit around a common center of mass every 27 days.

== Planetary system ==
Kepler-34b is a gas giant that orbits the two stars in the Kepler-34 system. The planet is just over a fifth of Jupiter's mass and has a radius of 0.764 Jupiter radii. The planet completes a somewhat eccentric orbit every 288.822 days from a semimajor axis of just over 1 AU, the largest of any transiting planets at the time of its discovery. Such detection was possible as the planet transits both the stars, thus requiring fewer orbits to confirm the planet.

The majority of circumbinary planets were formed much further away from binary stars. In case of Kepler-34, Kepler-34b has likely the migrated to their current locations due interaction with the massive debris disk. From the physical growth rate of planets and account data on collisions, it is found that Kelper-34b would have grown where we find it now.

Numerical simulation of formation of planetary system Kepler-34 has shown the formation of additional rocky planets in and near the habitable zone is unlikely.

The Kepler-34 planetary system
| Companion (in order from star) | Mass | Semimajor axis (AU) | Orbital period (days) | Eccentricity | Inclination (°) | Radius |
|---|---|---|---|---|---|---|
| b | 0.220 M_{J} | 1.0896 | 288.822 | 0.182 | 90.355 | 0.764 R_{J} |
