= Schilt (surname) =

- Alexander F. Schilt, American academic and higher education administrator
- Jan Schilt, Dutch-American astronomer
- Christian F. Schilt, American general in the U.S. Marine Corps
- Semmy Schilt, Dutch actor

== See also ==
- Schildt
- Schild
- 2308 Schilt, asteroid
