= 5655 Barney =

Minor planet

Discovery
- Discovered by: C. J. van Houten; I. van Houten-G. T. Gehrels
- Discovery site: Palomar Obs.
- Discovery date: 29 September 1973

Designations
- Named after: Ida Barney (American astronomer)
- Alternative designations: 1159 T-2 · 1988 EN_{1}
- Minor planet category: main-belt · (middle); Maria

Orbital characteristics
- Epoch 23 March 2018 (JD 2458200.5)
- Uncertainty parameter 0
- Observation arc: 44.56 yr (16,277 d)
- Aphelion: 2.6804 AU
- Perihelion: 2.4765 AU
- Semi-major axis: 2.5784 AU
- Eccentricity: 0.0395
- Orbital period (sidereal): 4.14 yr (1,512 d)
- Mean anomaly: 52.666°
- Mean motion: 0° 14^{m} 17.16^{s} / day
- Inclination: 14.497°
- Longitude of ascending node: 193.49°
- Argument of perihelion: 21.237°

Physical characteristics
- Mean diameter: 6.11 km (calculated); 6.599±0.055 km
- Synodic rotation period: 2.661±0.0003 h
- Geometric albedo: 0.20 (assumed); 0.256±0.028
- Spectral type: S
- Absolute magnitude (H): 12.985±0.002 (R); 13.0; 13.1; 13.26±0.28; 13.43

5655 Barney, provisional designation 1159 T-2, is a Maria asteroid from the central regions of the asteroid belt, approximately 6.5 kilometers (4 miles) in diameter. It was discovered during the second Palomar–Leiden Trojan survey in 1973, and named for American astronomer Ida Barney in 1994. The stony S-type asteroid has a rotation period of 2.66 hours.

== Orbit and classification ==
Barney is a core member of the Maria family (506), a large intermediate belt family of stony asteroids. It orbits the Sun in the central main-belt at a distance of 2.5–2.7 AU once every 4 years and 2 months (1,512 days; semi-major axis of 2.58 AU). Its orbit has an eccentricity of 0.04 and an inclination of 14° with respect to the ecliptic.

== Discovery ==
Barney was discovered on 29 September 1973, by Dutch astronomer couple Ingrid and Cornelis van Houten at Leiden, on photographic plates taken by Dutch–American astronomer Tom Gehrels at the U.S. Palomar Observatory, California. No precoveries were taken prior to its discovery. The body's observation arc begins with its official discovery observation.

=== Palomar–Leiden survey ===
The survey designation "T-2" stands for the second Palomar–Leiden Trojan survey, named after the fruitful collaboration of the Palomar and Leiden Observatory in the 1960s and 1970s. Gehrels used Palomar's Samuel Oschin telescope (also known as the 48-inch Schmidt Telescope), and shipped the photographic plates to Ingrid and Cornelis van Houten at Leiden Observatory where astrometry was carried out. The trio are credited with the discovery of several thousand asteroid discoveries.

== Physical characteristics ==
Barney has been characterized as a stony S-type asteroid in the SDSS taxonomy of the Moving Object Catalog (MOC) and by the survey conducted by Pan-STARRS.

=== Rotation period ===
In August 2010, a rotational lightcurve of Barney was obtained from photometric observations in the R-band by astronomers at the Palomar Transient Factory in California. Lightcurve analysis gave a rotation period of 2.661 hours with a brightness amplitude of 0.20 magnitude (U=2).

=== Diameter and albedo ===
According to the survey carried out by the NEOWISE mission of NASA's Wide-field Infrared Survey Explorer, Barney measures 6.599 kilometers in diameter and its surface has an albedo of 0.256. The Collaborative Asteroid Lightcurve Link assumes a standard albedo for a stony asteroid of 0.20 and calculates a diameter of 6.11 kilometers based on an absolute magnitude of 13.43.

== Naming ==
This minor planet was named in memory of American astronomer Ida Barney (1886–1982), who worked at the Yale University Observatory during 1924–1959. She supervised and significantly contributed to the Yale Observatory Zone Catalog for which the positions and proper motions of a large number stars were measured. The official naming citation was published by the Minor Planet Center on 25 May 1994 (M.P.C. 23541).
