= Yale Observatory Zone Catalog =

The Yale Observatory Zone Catalog a series of star catalogs published by the Yale University Observatory for 1939 to 1983, containing around 400,000 records.

A total of 25 catalogs were published, so all references to stars include both the catalog number and the star number.

== See also ==
- Bright Star Catalogue
- Ida Barney
- Ellen Dorrit Hoffleit
- Frank Schlesinger
