= Planet Hunters =

Citizen science project to find exoplanets

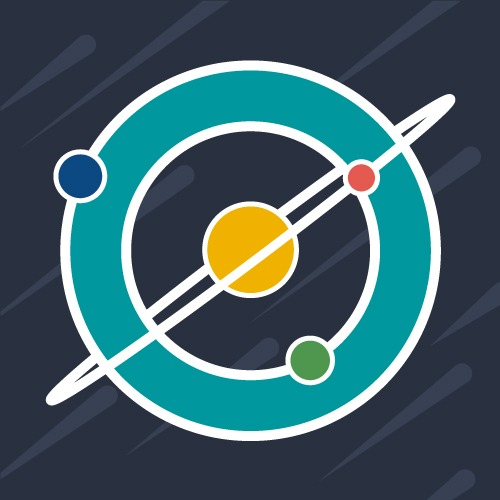
- Website type: Volunteer Scientific Project
- Available in: English
- Owner: Planet Hunters Team
- Creator: Planet Hunters Team
- Website: www.planethunters.org
- Commercial: No
- Registration: Optional
- Launched: 16 December 2010; 15 years ago
- Current status: Ongoing

Planet Hunters is a citizen science project to find exoplanets using human eyes. It does this by having users analyze data from the NASA Kepler space telescope and the NASA Transiting Exoplanet Survey Satellite. It was launched by a team led by Debra Fischer at Yale University, as part of the Zooniverse project.

== History ==
=== Planet Hunters and Planet Hunters 2.0 ===
The project was launched on 16 December 2010, after the first Data Release of Kepler data as the Planet Hunters Project. 300,000 volunteers participated in the project and the project team published 8 scientific papers. On December 14, 2014, the project was re-launched as Planet Hunters 2.0, with an improved website and considering that the volunteers will look at K2 data. As of November 2018, Planet Hunters had identified 50% of the known planets with an orbital period larger than two years.

=== Non-Planet Hunters project: Exoplanet Explorers ===
In 2017, the project Exoplanet Explorers was launched. It was another planet hunting project at Zooniverse and discovered the system K2-138 and the exoplanet K2-288Bb. This project was launched during the television program Stargazing Live and the discovery of the K2-138 system was announced during the program.

=== Planet Hunters TESS (PHT) ===
On 6 December 2018, the project Planet Hunters TESS (PHT) was launched and is led by astronomer Nora Eisner. This project uses data from the Transiting Exoplanet Survey Satellite (TESS) and is currently active (as of March 2023). This project discovered the Saturn-sized exoplanet TOI-813 b and many more.

Until March 2023, PHT discovered 284 exoplanet candidates (e.g. TIC 35021200.01), 15 confirmed exoplanets (e.g. TOI-5174 b) and countless eclipsing binaries. All discovered exoplanet candidates are uploaded to ExoFOP by Nora Eisner or sometimes by another project member (see TOI and CTOI list provided by ExoFOP).

All exoplanet candidates are manually checked by multiple project members (volunteers and moderators) and need to pass different tests before they are accepted by Nora Eisner and uploaded to ExoFOP. But it is possible that not all PHT planet candidates become real (confirmed) exoplanets. Some of them may be grazing eclipsing binaries.

=== Planet Hunters: NGTS ===
On 19 October 2021, the project Planet Hunters: NGTS was launched. It uses a dataset from the Next Generation Transit Survey to find transiting planets. It is the first Planet Hunters project that uses data from a ground-based telescope. The project looks at candidates that were already automatically filtered, similar to the Exoplanet Explorers project. The project found four candidate planets so far. In the pre-print five candidates are presented. This includes a giant planet candidate around TIC 165227846, a mid-M dwarf. This candidate was independently detected by Byrant et al. 2023 and if confirmed could represent the lowest-mass star to host a close-in giant.

== Planet hunting ==
The Planet Hunters project exploits the fact that humans are better at recognising visual patterns than computers. The website displays an image of data collected by the NASA Kepler Space Mission and asks human users (referred to as "Citizen Scientists") to look at the data and see how the brightness of a star changes over time. This brightness data is represented as a graph and referred to as a star's light curve. Such curves are helpful in discovering extrasolar planets due to the brightness of a star decreasing when a planet passes in front of it, as seen from Earth. Periods of reduced brightness can thus provide evidence of planetary transits, but may also be caused by errors in recording, projection, or other phenomena.

== Special occurrence ==
=== Eclipsing binary stars ===
From time to time, the project will observe eclipsing binary stars. Essentially these are stars that orbit each other. Much as a planet can interrupt the brightness of a star, another star can too. There is a noticeable difference on the light curves. It will appear as a large transit (a large dip) and a smaller transit (a smaller dip).

=== Multiplanet systems ===
As of December 2017, there are a total of 621 multiplanet systems, or stars that contains at least two confirmed planets. In a multiplanet system plot, there are many different patterns of transit. Due to the different sizes of planets, the transits dip down to different points.

=== Stellar flares ===
Stellar flares are observed when there is an explosion on the surface of a star. This will cause the star's brightness to shoot up considerably, with a steep drop off.

== Discoveries ==
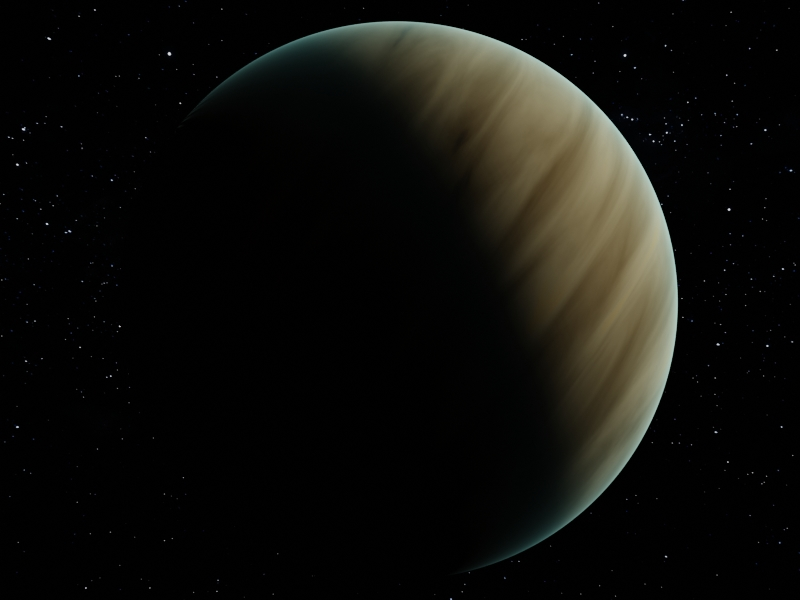
Artist's impression of TOI-813 b, an exoplanet discovered by Planet Hunters

So far, over 12 million observations have been analyzed. Out of those, 34 candidate planets had been found as of July 2012. In October 2012 it was announced that two volunteers from the Planet Hunters initiative had discovered a novel Neptune-like planet which is part of a four star double binary system, orbiting one of the pairs of stars while the other pair of stars orbits at a distance of around 1000 AU. This is the first planet discovered to have a stable orbit in such a complex stellar environment. The system is located 7200 light years away, and the new planet has been designated PH1b, short for Planet Hunters 1 b.

Key
#	circumbinary planet
§	Planet orbiting around one star in a multiple star system (S-class or Satellite-class planet)
‡	Host star with a Planetary system (two or more planets)

Yellow indicates a circumbinary planet. Light green indicates planet orbiting around one star in a multiple star system. Light blue indicates host stars with a planetary system consisting of two or more planets. Values for the host stars are acquired via SIMBAD and otherwise are cited. The apparent magnitude represents the V magnitude.

Planet	Mass (M_{J})	Radius (R_{J})	Orbital period (d)	Semimajor axis (AU)	Orbital ecc.	Inclin. (°)	Star	Constell.	App. mag.	Distance (ly)	Spectral type	Year of confirmation	Ref
PH1b# (Kepler-64b)	<0.531	0.55	138.3	0.65	0.07	90.1	Kepler-64	Cygnus	13.718	7200	F/M	2012	
PH2b (Kepler-86b)	<80.0	0.9	282.5255	0.828	0.12 - 0.49	89.8	Kepler-86	Cygnus	12.699	1200	~G4	2013	
PH3b (Kepler-289b)	0.002 - 0.04	0.19	34.545	0.2		89.6	Kepler-289‡	Cygnus	14.144	2300		2014	
PH3c (Kepler-289c)	0.4	1.03	125.85	0.5		89.8	Kepler-289‡	Cygnus	14.144	2300		2014	
PH3d (Kepler-289d)	0.01	0.24	66.1	0.3		89.7	Kepler-289‡	Cygnus	14.144	2300		2014	
WASP-47d	0.04	0.32	9.031	0.07 - 0.1	<0.014	89.3	WASP-47‡	Aquarius	11.9	870	G9V	2015	
WASP-47e	0.02	0.16	0.7896	0.02	0.01 - 0.07	86.0	WASP-47‡	Aquarius	11.9	870	G9V	2015	
Kepler-455b		0.6	1311.1 - 1708.4			90.0	Kepler-455	Cygnus	14.355	4100		2015	
Kepler-456b		0.2 - 2.9	1167.6 - 13,721.9			89.8	Kepler-456	Lyra	12.819	2500	F5V	2015	
Kepler-457b		0.2 - 0.6	31.81			89.3	Kepler-457‡	Lyra	14.331	3600		2015	
Kepler-457c		0.1 - 0.4	74.1 - 114.1			89.7	Kepler-457‡	Lyra	14.331	3600		2015	
Kepler-458b		0.4	572.38			89.8	Kepler-458‡	Cygnus	14.083	5500	F6IV	2015	
Kepler-459b		0.5	854.08			89.9	Kepler-459	Lyra	15.487	5000		2015	
Kepler-460b§		0.6	440.78			89.9	Kepler-460‡	Lyra	13.827	4300	F6IV	2015	
TOI-813 b		0.60	83.89	0.42		89.6	TOI-813	Dorado	10.286	870	G0 IV	2020	
TOI-1338 b#	0.104	0.611	95.174	0.4607	0.0880	89.37	TOI-1338	Pictor	11.722	1300	M+G	2020(?)	
HD 152843 b	0.017-0.057	0.304	11.6264	0.1053	0.14	88.85	HD 152843‡	Hercules	8.85	351.9	G0	2021	
HD 152843 c	<0.086	0.520	19.26-35		0.115	88.89	HD 152843‡	Hercules	8.85	351.9	G0	2021	
TOI-5174 b		0.48 (5.351 Earth radii)	12.214286				TOI-5174	Leo	11.583	643.33	G6.0V (derived)	2022	

=== Community TESS Object of Interest ===
Planet Hunters TESS (PHT) publishes Community TESS Object of Interest (CTOI) at ExoFOP, which can be promoted into a TESS Object of Interest (TOI). Of the 151 CTOIs submitted by Planet Hunters researchers, 81 were promoted to TOIs (as of September 2022). The following exoplanets first submitted as PHT CTOIs were later researched by other teams (some examples): TOI-1759 b, TOI-1899 b, TOI-2180 b, TOI-4562 b and HD 148193 b (TOI-1836).

=== Variable stars and unusual systems ===
In September 2013, the project discovered the unusual cataclysmic variable KIC 9406652. In April 2014 the unusually active SU Ursae Majoris-type dwarf nova GALEX J194419.33+491257.0 was discovered. This cataclysmic variable was discovered as a background dwarf nova of KIC 11412044.

In January 2016, unusual dips in KIC 8462852 were announced. The unusual light curve of KIC 8462852 (also known as Boyajian's Star) has engendered speculation that an alien civilization's Dyson sphere is responsible.

In June 2016, the project found 32 likely eclipsing binaries. The work also announced likely exoplanets.

In February 2018, the first transiting exocomets were discovered. The dips were found by one of the authors, a Planet Hunters participant, in a visual search over five months of the complete Q1-Q17 Kepler light curve archive spanning 201250 target stars.

In February 2022, Planet Hunters:TESS announced the discovery of BD+61 2536 (TIC 470710327), a massive hierarchical triple star system. The system is predicted to undergo multiple phases of mass transfer in the future, and likely end up as a double neutron star gravitational wave progenitor or an exotic Thorne-Zytkow object.

== See also ==
Zooniverse projects:

- Amateur exoplanet discoveries
- The Daily Minor Planet
- Asteroid Zoo
- Backyard Worlds
- Disk Detective
- Galaxy Zoo
- Old Weather
- SETILive
- The Milky Way Project
