= Gerald Maurice Clemence =

American astronomer (1908–1974)

- Born: August 16, 1908; Greenville, Rhode Island, U.S.
- Died: November 22, 1974 (aged 66); Providence, Rhode Island, U.S.
- Education: Brown University (PhB)
- Awards: Gold Medal of the Royal Astronomical Society (1965); James Craig Watson Medal (1975)
- Scientific career
- Fields: Astronomy, Celestial mechanics
- Workplaces: United States Naval Observatory; Yale University

Gerald Maurice Clemence (16 August 1908 – 22 November 1974) was an American astronomer. Inspired by the life and work of Simon Newcomb, his career paralleled the huge advances in astronomy brought about by the advent of the electronic computer. Clemence did much to revive the prestige of the U.S. Nautical Almanac Office.

== Early life ==
Born on a farm near Greenville, Rhode Island, Gerald's parents were Richard R. Clemence and his wife, Lora, née Oatley. Much of his elementary education was at home with his mother, herself a schoolteacher, and he learned about astronomy from his own enthusiastic reading. Clemence attended Brown University and read mathematics, achieving a PhB degree in 1930. In his own words, "as a recreation", he took the civil service examination for the job description "astronomer" and finished first out of fifty candidates, winning appointment at the United States Naval Observatory. Taking up the post, he married Edith Melvina Vail, a nurse, in 1929.

== Mercury and Mars ==
After initial work in the Time Service Department, alongside William Markowitz, Clemence was assigned to work under H. R. Morgan. George William Hill had computed the orbits of Jupiter and Saturn in the nineteenth century and Newcomb had completed the work for the other planets of the Solar System. However, there was now almost fifty years of new observational data and Clemence set to recalculate the orbital elements of Mercury to provide more accurate predictions. His results, published in 1943, clearly showed the perihelion precession of Mercury predicted by the general theory of relativity.

Clemence identified systematic errors in the predictions of Mars' path. The residuals showed a marked periodicity and Clemence concluded that the Fourier series on which the predictions were based was wrong. Clemence set out to derive a new series from scratch using the methods detailed by Hill and Peter Andreas Hansen in the nineteenth century. The calculations were carried out with "a lead pencil, large sheets of computing paper, [and] a hand-operated Millionaire desk calculator". Though electronic calculators were available towards the end of the project, the calculations took twelve years.

== Nautical Almanac Office ==
Wallace John Eckert was appointed as director of the Nautical Almanac Office in 1940 and immediately imported his enthusiasm for using punched card machines for scientific calculation. Clemence was an early senior appointment to the new regime and soon saw the potential of electronic computation, using it initially on his Mars work but increasingly on the military work whose priority escalated following the entry of the U.S. into World War II.

Clemence was appointed assistant director in 1942 and was joined on the staff by Paul Herget. The pair worked on calculating mathematical tables and developed the optimum-interval technique to construct tables calculated at non-constant intervals and for which linear interpolation was everywhere legitimate.

In 1945, Eckert left for the IBM-sponsored computing laboratory at Columbia University and Herget became director of the Cincinnati Observatory. Clemence was promoted to director of the Nautical Almanac Office, the post once held by his role-model Newcomb, and proved an able and energetic administrator.

== Research collaboration ==
In 1947, there began an intense period of cooperative research on celestial mechanics between Clemence's office, Eckert's group at Columbia and Yale University Observatory, under the direction of Dirk Brouwer, a former collaborator of Eckert's on punched cards.

== Later career ==
In 1958, Clemence was appointed first scientific director of the U.S. Naval Observatory, a post he again addressed with enthusiasm and vigour. His own original research necessarily took a lower profile but he continued to publish on relativity, astronomical constants and time measurement, as well as collaborating on two text books.

However, Clemence's passion for research ultimately led him to relinquish his managerial roles in 1962, and, in 1963 Brouwer found him a post at Yale. Here, Clemence continued his work on the perturbation theory of the Earth's orbit but it was interrupted, never to be completed, in 1966 when Brouwer's death demanded that Clemence take over the administration of the department.

He died in Providence, Rhode Island on November 22, 1974, after an illness of several months.

== Personality ==
He was a family man, father of two sons, and always maintained contact with his three brothers and his sister. He was a keen, and self-taught, musician, accomplished at violin, piano and organ. He was also a keen railfan.

== Offices, awards and honors ==
- Fellow of the Royal Astronomical Society (UK), (1946);
- Honorary member of the Royal Astronomical Society of Canada, (1946);
- Member of the National Academy of Sciences, (1952);
- Fellow of the American Academy of Arts and Sciences, (1955);
- President American Astronomical Society, (1958–1960);
- Gold Medal of the Royal Astronomical Society, (1965);
- Editor of the Astronomical Journal, (1969–1974);
- James Craig Watson Medal of the National Academy of Sciences, (1975);
- The main-belt asteroid 1919 Clemence was named in his memory.

== Bibliography ==
- Brouwer, D.; Clemence, G. M. (1961). Methods of Celestial Mechanics. Academic Press. ISBN 978-0-12-135650-7.
- Duncombe, R. L. (2001). "Gerald Maurice Clemence". Biographical Memoirs of the National Academy of Sciences. 79.
- Sawyer Hogg, H. (1975). "Gerald Maurice Clemence, 1908-1974". Journal of the Royal Astronomical Society of Canada. 69: 136. Bibcode:1975JRASC..69..136S.
- Woolard, E. W.; Clemence, G. M. (1966). Spherical Astronomy. Academic Press. ISBN 978-0-12-762750-2.
