= PH3 (disambiguation) =

PH_{3} is the chemical formula for phosphine. PH3 may refer to:

- Kepler-289, the star
- PH3, the type of the medical condition primary hyperoxaluria
