= William Lewis Elkin =

American astronomer (1855–1933)

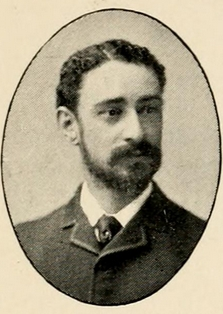
- Born: April 29, 1855; New Orleans, Louisiana, US
- Died: May 30, 1933 (aged 78)
- Education: University of Strasbourg
- Awards: Lalande Prize (1908)
- Scientific career
- Fields: Astronomy
- Workplaces: Yale Observatory

William Lewis Elkin (April 29, 1855 – May 30, 1933) was an American astronomer known for his detailed work measuring parallaxes and for pioneering work in meteor photography. He served as director of the Yale University Observatory from 1896 to 1910.

== Early life and education ==
He was born on April 29, 1855, in New Orleans, go Jane and Lewis Elkin, one of five children but the only one to survive to adulthood. Following the death of her husband in 1867, Jane travelled abroad for the following seventeen years, taking along William. As a result of a broad education, he learned to speak fluently in German and French, and acquired a basic understanding of Italian and Spanish. He also received a broad knowledge of music from many nations, and would retain a deep love of music for the remainder of his life.

He became seriously ill in 1870, possibly from dysentery, and thereafter he would suffer health problems for the remainder of his life. In 1872, he joined the Royal Polytechnic School in Stuttgart, Germany, where he studied civil engineering, graduating in 1876. While at school, however, he gained an interest in astronomy and decided to make that his life's work. After graduation, he spent four years working at the Observatory of Strasbourg. In 1880 he was awarded a Ph.D. from the University of Strasbourg, with a dissertation on the parallax of Alpha Centauri.

== Career ==
=== Heliometric observations ===
A year before Elkin left Strassburg, he had a meeting with the directory of the Cape Observatory, David Gill. The two men became fast friends and Gill extended Elkin an invitation to Cape Town. Dr. Elkin sailed for South Africa in December, 1880, arriving in 1881. While at the observatory, Gill and Elkin collaborated to measure stellar parallaxes of first magnitude stars using a heliometer.

In 1884, H. A. Newton invited Elkin to become "Astronomer in Charge of the Heliometer" at the Yale University Observatory. Elkin succeeded Newton as the observatory director in 1896. Elkin first used the Yale Heliometer to make measurements of the Pleiades and later a survey of northern stars. Working with Frederick L. Chase and Mason Smith, the heliometer was used to undertake a survey which identified 238 parallaxes. These efforts were noted for their particular accuracy, at least for that time period, and elimination of systematic errors by Frank Schlesinger.

=== Meteor photography ===
Elkin is also recognized as a pioneer of meteor photography and between 1894 and 1910 he captured photographs of around 130 meteor trails. Using two groups of cameras with rotating shutters, an idea first suggested by Jonathan Homer Lane, he was the first to accurately determine meteor velocities.

== Personal life ==
In 1896, he married Catharine Adams in New Haven. Due to ill health, he retired at age 55, and died on May 30, 1933, aged 78. During his retirement, he pursued music, photography, reading and car mechanics.

== Awards and honors ==
- Foreign Associate of the Royal Astronomical Society of London, 1892.
- Honorary M.A., Yale University, 1893.
- Elected to the National Academy of Sciences, 1895.
- Lalande Prize of the French Academy of Sciences, 1908.
- Honorary Doctorate, University of Christiana, 1911.
