= 1919 Clemence =

Hungaria asteroid and suspected tumbler

Discovery
- Discovered by: J. Gibson; C. U. Cesco
- Discovery site: El Leoncito
- Discovery date: 16 September 1971

Designations
- Named after: Gerald Clemence (astronomer)
- Alternative designations: 1971 SA · 1970 EA_{1} 1971 QZ
- Minor planet category: main-belt · (inner); Hungaria

Orbital characteristics
- Epoch 4 September 2017 (JD 2458000.5)
- Uncertainty parameter 0
- Observation arc: 46.23 yr (16,884 days)
- Aphelion: 2.1200 AU
- Perihelion: 1.7522 AU
- Semi-major axis: 1.9361 AU
- Eccentricity: 0.0950
- Orbital period (sidereal): 2.69 yr (984 days)
- Mean anomaly: 286.44°
- Mean motion: 0° 21^{m} 57.24^{s} / day
- Inclination: 19.337°
- Longitude of ascending node: 357.00°
- Argument of perihelion: 99.880°

Physical characteristics
- Dimensions: 3.238±0.015 km 3.276±0.010; 4.95 km (calculated)
- Synodic rotation period: 67.4±0.1 h (revised); 68.5±0.1 h (original)
- Geometric albedo: 0.3 (assumed); 0.686±0.108; 0.7103±0.0672
- Spectral type: Tholen = X X · E B–V = 0.750; U–B = 0.254
- Absolute magnitude (H): 13.45

1919 Clemence, provisional designation 1971 SA, is a bright Hungaria asteroid and suspected tumbler from the inner regions of the asteroid belt, approximately 4 kilometers in diameter. It was discovered on 16 September 1971, by American astronomer James Gibson together with Argentine astronomer Carlos Cesco at the Yale-Columbia Southern Station at Leoncito Astronomical Complex in Argentina. It is named after astronomer Gerald Clemence.

== Orbit and classification ==
Clemence is a member of the Hungaria family, which form the innermost dense concentration of asteroids in the Solar System. It orbits the Sun at a distance of 1.8–2.1 AU once every 2 years and 8 months (984 days). Its orbit has an eccentricity of 0.10 and an inclination of 19° with respect to the ecliptic.

== Physical characteristics ==
In the Tholen taxonomic scheme, Clemence is classified as an X-type asteroid. It has also been characterized as an E-type asteroid by the NEOWISE mission.

=== Rotation period ===
In March 2005, a rotational lightcurve was obtained by American astronomer Brian Warner at his Palmer Divide Observatory (716) in Colorado. Lightcurve analysis gave a rotation period of 67.4±0.1 hours and a brightness variation of 0.15 magnitude (U=2, revised analysis). While not being a slow rotator, Clemence has a significantly longer period than most other asteroids, which typically have a spin rate between 2 and 20 hours.

Czech astronomer Petr Pravec from the Ondřejov Observatory believes this may be a tumbling asteroid, yet observations are not sufficient to determine a non-principal axis rotation.

=== Diameter and albedo ===
According to the surveys carried out by the NEOWISE mission of NASA's Wide-field Infrared Survey Explorer, the asteroid measures 3.2 kilometers in diameter and its surface has an outstandingly high albedo of 0.71, while the Collaborative Asteroid Lightcurve Link assumes an albedo of 0.30 and calculates a somewhat larger diameter of 4.95 kilometers with an absolute magnitude of 13.45.

== Naming ==
This minor planet was named after American astronomer Gerald Maurice Clemence (1908–1974), first scientific director of the United States Naval Observatory and professor of astronomy at the Yale Observatory, known for his work on the theory of the motion of Mars and Mercury, on the system of astronomical constants, and other research in celestial mechanics. He served as president of the American Astronomical Society and of IAU. The official naming citation was published by the Minor Planet Center on 20 February 1976 (M.P.C. 3937).
