= The TESS-Keck Survey =

Exoplanet search project

The TESS-Keck Survey or TKS is an exoplanet search project that uses the Keck I and the Automated Planet Finder (APF) to conduct ground-based follow-up of planet candidates discovered by the Transiting Exoplanet Survey Satellite. The TKS aims to measure the mass for about 100 exoplanets and has been awarded some of the largest time allocations in the histories of Keck I and APF. The program has four main science themes:

1. the bulk compositions of small planets
2. dynamical temperatures and system architectures
3. a larger, more refined sample for future atmospheric studies
4. planets orbiting evolved stars

== List of discoveries ==
Name	Class	Radius (R_{🜨})	Mass (M_{🜨})	Bulk density (g/cm^{3})	Orbital period (days)	Discovery year	Note	Reference
HD 332231 b	warm sub-Saturn	9.744	76.32	0.464	18.71	2020		
TOI-561 b	super-earth	1.45	3.2	5.5	0.44	2021	old metal-poor host star	
TOI-561 c	sub-Neptune	2.90	6.5	1.6	10.8	2021	old metal-poor host star	
TOI-561 d	sub-Neptune	2.32	2.4	1.3	16.4	2021	metal-poor host star	
HD 63935 b	sub-Neptune	2.99	10.8	2.2	9.06	2021		
HD 63935 c	sub-Neptune	2.90	11.1	2.5	21.40	2021		
HIP-97166 b	sub-Neptune	2.7	20	5.3	10.3	2021	eccentric orbit	
HIP-97166 c	sub-Neptune		10		16.8	2021	eccentric orbit	
TOI-2180 b	giant planet	11.3	890.4	3.32	260.8	2022	originally found by citizen scientists of Planet Hunters, planet with eccentric orbit	
HD 191939 e	warm Saturn		108		101.5	2022	study also announced the mass of the other planets	
HD 191939 f	giant planet		≥630		1700-7200	2022	candidate	
TOI-1444 b	super-earth	1.4	3.87		0.47	2021		
TOI-1444 c			11.8		16	2021	candidate	
TOI-1246 e			>25.6		93.8	2022	candidate, study also announced the mass of the other planets	
TOI-1272 b	hot Neptune	4.1	25	1.9	3.3	2022	eccentric orbit	
TOI-1272 c			27		8.7	2022		
TOI-1669 c	giant planet		191		501	2022	planet b is a close-in small planet (about 4 M_{🜨})	
TOI-1694 c	giant planet		295		393	2022	planet b is a close-in small planet (31 M_{🜨})	
HIP 8152 b (TOI-266)	sub-Neptune	2.6	7.8	2.5	10.75	2023		
HIP 8152 c	sub-Neptune	2.5	9.4	3.4	19.61	2023		
HD 42813 b (TOI-469)	sub-Neptune	3.4	5.8	0.8	13.63	2023	star is metal-rich, planet has relative low density	
HD 25463 b (TOI-554)	sub-Neptune	2.6	8.5	2.6	7.05	2023		
HD 25463 c	super-Earth	1.5	<4.1	<7.1	3.04	2023		
TOI-669 b	hot sub-Neptune	2.6	9.8	3.0	3.95	2023		
HD 135694 b (TOI-1247)	warm sub-Neptune	2.51	5.7	2.0	15.92	2023		
HD 6061 b (TOI-1473)	hot sub-Neptune	2.45	10.8	4.0	5.25	2023		
TOI-1736 b	sub-Neptune	3.1	11.9	2.3	7.07	2023	star is a subgiant	
TOI-1736 c	temperature super-Jovian		>2477		571.3	2023	not transiting, in a moderately eccentric orbit	
TOI-1386 b	warm sub-Saturn	6.05	47	1.16	25.84	2024	orbits a solar analogue	
TOI-1386 c			>98		227.6	2024	not transiting	
TOI-1347 b	ultra-short period planet	1.8	11.1	9.9	0.85	2024	possible high molecular weight atmosphere	
TOI-1347 c		1.6	<6.4	<4.1	4.84	2024		
TOI-329 b	Neptune size	4.72	40.8	2.13	5.70	2024	old subgiant host star; moderate eccentric orbit e=0.39	
HD 39688 b (TOI-480)	Earth-density	2.69	15.7	4.42	6.86	2024		
TOI-603 b		7.93	47.5	0.52	16.17	2024	subgiant host star	
TOI-1199 b	giant planet	10.60	69.4	0.32	3.67	2024		
TOI-1294 b	Saturn-sized	9.19	62.2	0.44	3.91	2024	massive metal-rich host star	
TOI-1294 c			148.3		160.1	2024	not transiting	
TOI-1439 b	Neptune-sized	4.15	38.4	2.94	27.64	2024	metal-rich subgiant host star	
TOI-1605 b	Jupiter-sized	10.34	221.3		8.70	2024	solar-like metallicity host star; eccentric orbit e=0.28	
TOI-1828 b	hot Jupiter	8.62	58.5	0.50	9.09	2024	subgiant host star; eccentric orbit e=0.31	
HD 148193 b (TOI-1836)		8.38	28.4	0.27	20.38	2024	young and hot subgiant host star	
TOI-1885 b	giant planet	13.66	516.4	1.12	6.54	2024	young and hot host star	
HD 83342 b (TOI-1898)	warm Jupiter	9.74	127.5	0.76	45.52	2024	CTOI of Planet Hunters: TESS; highly eccentric orbit e=0.48	
TOI-2019 b		5.66	34.6	1.05	15.34	2024	cool metal-rich subgiant host star	
TOI-1736 c			2477		571.3	2024	eccentric orbit e=0.37	
TOI-1751 b	sub-Neptune	2.77	14.5	3.6	37.47	2024	slightly evolved solar-type metal-poor star	
TOI-1824 b	sub-Neptune	2.63	18.5	5.6	22.81	2024	a superdense sub-Neptune	
HD 154840 b (TOI-1437)	sub-Neptune	2.24	9.6		18.84	2024		

Follow-up works by TKS studied the already discovered planets TOI-1726 c and WASP-107b. An additional 15 newly confirmed planets are presented in a work from 2024.
