= Ph2 =

ph2, ph-2, ph.2 or variant, may refer to:

- AMD Phenom II CPU chip
- PH2 (Planet Hunters 2), star system with a planet
  - PH2 b, a planet around that star
- 1991 PH2 or 9341 Gracekelly
- 1992 PH2 or (13089) 1992 PH2
- Hall PH-2, biplane flying boat
- Pander PH.2 Mayer, see List of aircraft (P)
- biphenyl, Ph_{2} or Ph-Ph
- Phenolphthalein, ph2 or phph
- PH2, a postcode in Perth, Scotland, see PH postcode area
- PH_{2}^{−} the phosphanide ion in inorganic chemistry
- -PH_{2} the phosphanyl group in organic chemistry
