= TOI-2180 b =

Jovian-sized exoplanet orbiting TOI-2180

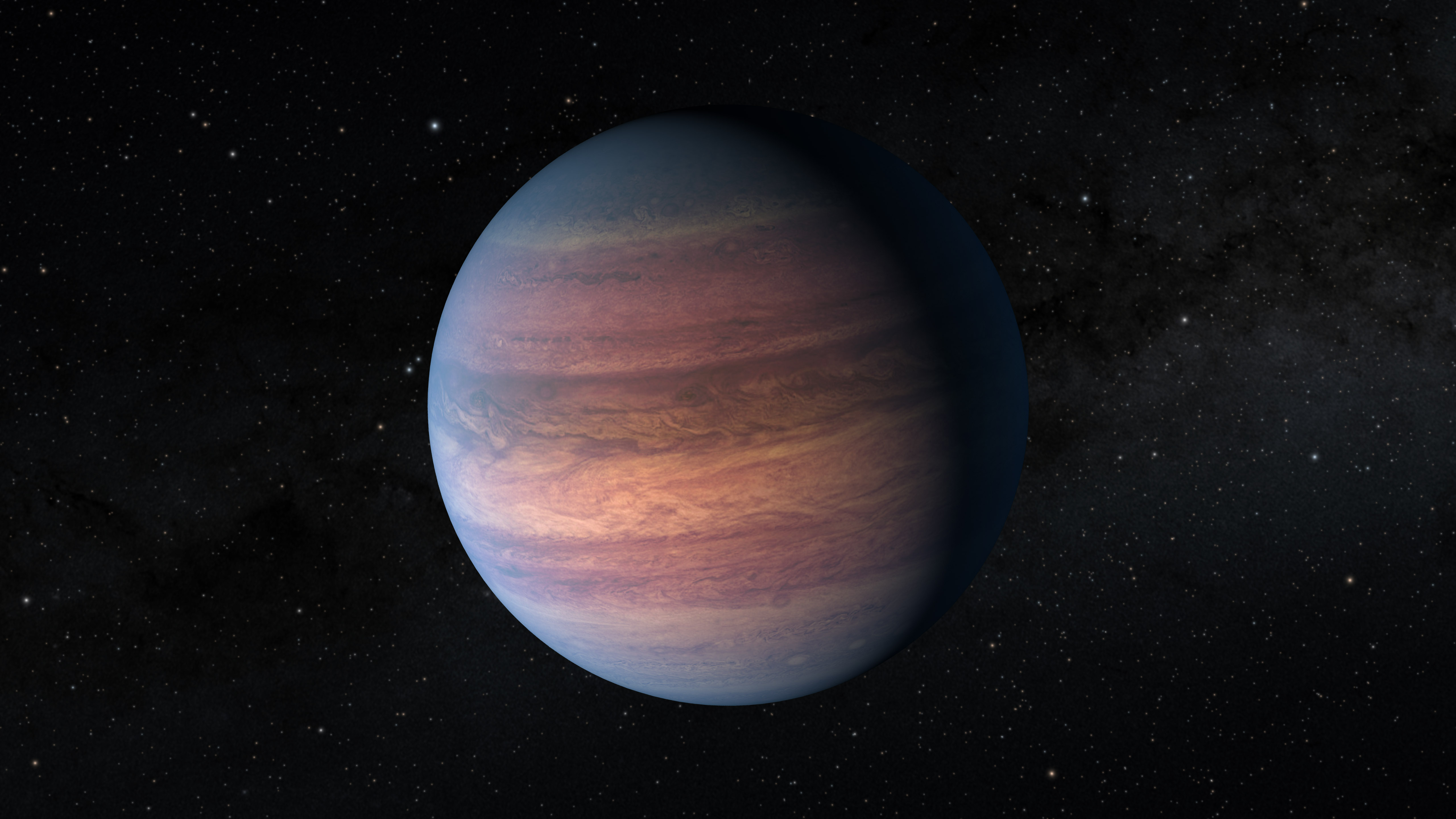
- illustration of TOI-2180 b

Discovery
- Discovered by: The TESS-Keck Survey
- Discovery date: February 2022
- Detection method: Transit Method

Designations
- Alternative names: HD 238894 b

Orbital characteristics
- Semi-major axis: 0.828±0.012 au
- Eccentricity: 0.3683 ± 0.0073
- Orbital period (sidereal): 260.15764 ± 0.00045 days
- Inclination: 89.955+0.032 −0.044
- Star: HD 238894

Physical characteristics
- Mean radius: 1.010+0.022 −0.019 R_{J}
- Mass: 2.755+0.087 −0.081 M_{J}
- Surface gravity: 3.827+0.012 −0.015 dex
- Temperature: 348.0+3.3 −3.6 K

TOI-2180 b is a giant exoplanet orbiting the G-type star TOI-2180, also known as HD 238894. It was discovered with the help of the Transiting Exoplanet Survey Satellite and is currently the exoplanet with the longest orbital period TESS was able to uncover (as of September 2022). TOI-2180 b orbits its host star every 260.16 days.

== Discovery ==
TOI-2180 b was first identified as an exoplanet candidate due to a single transit with TESS at 12./13. December 2019 by a group of citizen scientists called the Visual Survey Group, which includes Thomas Lee Jacobs, a former U.S. naval officer. The group was using the light curve processing tool lcTools. In May 2020 the Planet Hunters: TESS collaboration announced this object as a Community TESS Object of Interest (CTOI) and it was soon promoted into a regular TOI.

The TESS-Keck Survey collaboration performed radial velocity follow-up observations for nearly 2 years with the Automated Planet Finder and Keck I. The follow-up observations uncovered that the single transit was caused by a long-period planet.

== Orbital properties ==
TOI-2180 b has a long orbital period of 260.16 days, which also leads to a long transit duration of 24 hours. The distance to the host star is 82.8% the sun-earth distance. The planet does not orbit inside the habitable zone, despite this close resemblance in semi-major axis. TOI-2180 b has a high eccentricity of the orbit at 0.37.

The second transit was not detected from the ground and the third transit was not observed. The fourth transit was observed at 31. January/01. February 2022, refining the orbital period. The next transit will occur on 2022 October 18 at 21:28 UTC.

== Physical properties ==
The planet has the same size as Jupiter, but is 2.8 times heavier than Jupiter. TOI-2180 b stand out because of its cold estimated temperature of about 348 Kelvin (74.9 °C, 166.7 °F). This is closer to Jupiters 165 K than most discovered giant exoplanets. TOI-2180 b belongs to a small sample of temperate Jupiters with a temperature <400 K that transit, such as Kepler-167 e, WD 1856+534 b, Kepler-1704 b, KOI-3680 b, Kepler-1514 b and Kepler-539 b. TOI-2180 b has by far the brightest host star with a visual magnitude of 9.16, which is about 3 magnitudes brighter than the next brightest system in this sample.

The planet is likely enriched in metals compared to its host star. The discovery team inferred that TOI-2180 b is enriched in metals by a factor of about 5 compared to its host star. This means it has about 100 M_{🜨} of heavy elements in its envelope and interior.

=== Future observations ===
The exoplanet is a poor target for transmission spectroscopy because of its high surface gravity and the large radius of the host star. The large radius of the star causes a relative shallow transit depth of about 0.5%. The system is still an excellent target to find rings and exomoons around TOI-2180 b. It is also a good target to study the migration of exoplanets. It could be one of the best targets for exomoon searches.

== Host star ==
The host star is a 9.16 magnitude bright and slightly evolved star with a spectral type of G5. It has a mass of 1.1 M_{☉} and a radius of 1.6 R_{☉}. The radius is increased due to the evolved nature of the star. The star is 116 parsec (379 light-years) distant from earth and has an age of about 8.1 billion years.

=== Habitable Zone ===
Currently the habitable zone around TOI-2180 is between 1.5 and 2.2 astronomical units. (Note: Using a luminosity of 2.544 by Dalba et al. and using step 2 by Morris) Because TOI-2180 is slightly evolved, it had a habitable zone closer to the star in the past. At an age of about 3 billion years the habitable zone was located between 1.1 and 1.6 astronomical units. (Note: Using MIST evolutionary track with initial mass=1.115 Msun (best match from isochromes), initial metallicity [Fe/H]=0.269 (Delba et al for TOI-2180) and using synthetic photometry output UBV etc. Then the approach by Morris was used, assuming the star was an F-type back then.)

== Outer planet candidate ==
The radial velocity monitoring also showed acceleration of TOI-2180 b due to an outer planet or low-mass star in the system. A later analysis of RV data has shown that an outer companion has an orbital period of 1558+68
−19 days, an eccentricity of about 0.31 and a minimum mass of 3.94+0.27
−0.22 M_{J}, making it likely a giant planet. The acceleration (TTV) and the outer companion detected in the RV could be the same object.
