= Jan Schilt =

Dutch-American astronomer

Jan Schilt (3 February 1894, Gouda – 9 January 1982, Englewood, New Jersey) was a Dutch-American astronomer, inventor of the Schilt photometer.

== Biography ==
Schilt was born in 1894 in the Netherlands, and educated there under Jacobus Kapteyn. After the death of Kapteyn in 1922 he finished his PhD thesis in 1924 with Pieter Johannes van Rhijn 'On a Thermo-Electric Method of Measuring Photographic Magnitudes'. This work was mainly done at Leiden Observatory where he stayed from 1922 to 1925.

He emigrated to the United States in 1925, first to Mount Wilson Observatory, in 1926 to Yale University Observatory and in 1931 he was appointed associated professor at Rutherford Observatory.

In 1933 he became the Chair of Columbia University's astronomy department, a position which he filled until his retirement in 1962, when he was granted the title of Rutherford Professor of Astronomy Emeritus.

Schilt's astronomical work included the invention of the Schilt photometer, a device which measures the light output (apparent magnitude) of stars on photographic plates, and, indirectly, their distances. He worked on the motions of star streams in the Milky Way Galaxy, and was director of the Yale-Columbia Southern Station in Johannesburg and Canberra, as well as Director of the Rutherford Observatory at Columbia.

Schilt was noted at Columbia for walking into his classes the first day after the launch of Sputnik 1 and commenting "Well, gentlemen, it is not every day we have something new in the sky to talk about", following which he devoted the entire class to proving that Sputnik had been deliberately launched into an orbit designed to make it invisible from the United States for as long as possible (six weeks).

13,500 items of his papers are contained in the Rare Book and Manuscript Library of Columbia University.

== Honor ==
Asteroid 2308 Schilt (1967 JM) was named in his honor.

== Published works ==
- Barney, Ida; Schilt, Jan (1927). "Discussion of the proper motions in the equatorial Zone". Astronomical Journal. 37: 181. Bibcode:1927AJ.....37..181B. doi:10.1086/104785.
- Barney, Ida; Schilt, Jan (1930). "Analysis of the Yale proper motions in the zones between +50 degrees and +55 degrees and between +55 degrees and +60". Astronomical Journal. 40: 168. Bibcode:1930AJ.....40..168B. doi:10.1086/105000.

== See also ==
- Ida Barney
