= 1917 Cuyo =

Stony near-Earth asteroid

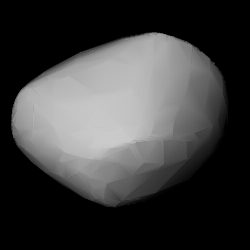
- Modelled shape of Cuyo from its lightcurve

Discovery
- Discovered by: C. U. Cesco; A. G. Samuel
- Discovery site: El Leoncito Complex
- Discovery date: 1 January 1968

Designations
- Named after: Universidad Nacional de Cuyo
- Alternative designations: 1968 AA
- Minor planet category: NEO · Amor

Orbital characteristics
- Epoch 27 April 2019 (JD 2458600.5)
- Uncertainty parameter 0
- Observation arc: 65.08 yr (23,769 d)
- Earliest precovery date: 6 May 1954
- Aphelion: 3.2353 AU
- Perihelion: 1.0624 AU
- Semi-major axis: 2.1488 AU
- Eccentricity: 0.5056
- Orbital period (sidereal): 3.15 yr (1,151 d)
- Mean anomaly: 129.40°
- Mean motion: 0° 18^{m} 46.44^{s} / day
- Inclination: 23.962°
- Longitude of ascending node: 188.31°
- Argument of perihelion: 194.53°
- Earth MOID: 0.0716 AU (27.8938 LD)

Physical characteristics
- Mean diameter: 5.7 km
- Synodic rotation period: 2.6890 h
- Geometric albedo: 0.195±0.032
- Spectral type: SMASS = Sl
- Absolute magnitude (H): 13.9; 14.3

1917 Cuyo (prov. designation: 1968 AA) is an stony asteroid and near-Earth object of the Amor group, approximately 5.7 kilometers (3.5 miles) in diameter. It was discovered on 1 January 1968, by astronomer Carlos Cesco and A. G. Samuel at El Leoncito Observatory, Argentina.

== Orbit and classification ==
Cuyo orbits the Sun at a distance of 1.1–3.2 AU once every 3 years and 2 months (1,151 days; semi-major axis of 2.15 AU). Its orbit has an eccentricity of 0.51 and an inclination of 24° with respect to the ecliptic.

== Physical characteristics ==
Cuyo is a stony Sl-type asteroid in the SMASS classification. In 1989, Cuyo was detected with radar from the Arecibo Observatory at a distance of 0.17 AU. The measured radar cross-section was 2.5 km^{2}. According to the survey carried out by NASA's Wide-field Infrared Survey Explorer with its subsequent NEOWISE mission, Cuyo measures 5.7 kilometers in diameter and its surface has an albedo of 0.195.

== Naming ==
This minor planet is named in honor of the Universidad Nacional de Cuyo, which operated the observatory at El Leoncito in collaboration with Columbia and Yale University. Cuyo is also the name of a region in central-west Argentina. The official naming citation was published by the Minor Planet Center on 1 June 1975 (M.P.C. 3828).
