= TOI-813 b =

Gas giant exoplanet orbiting TOI-813

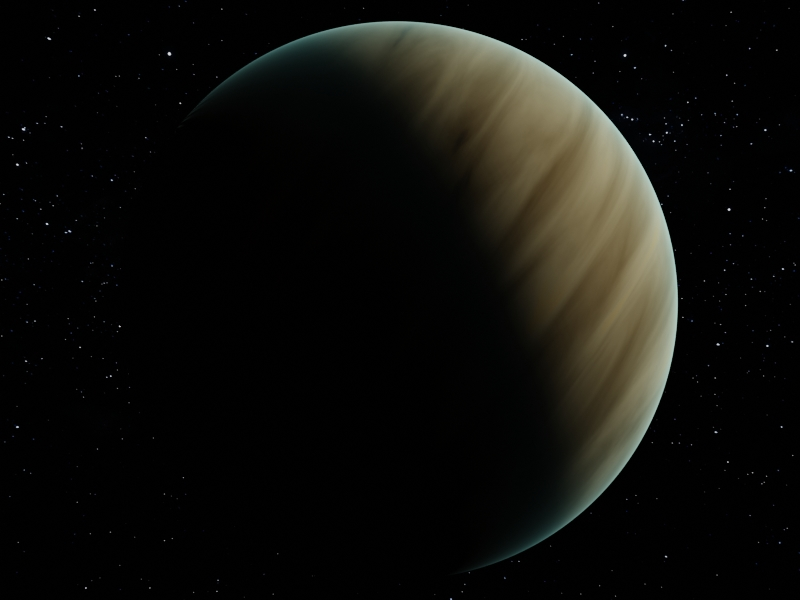
- An artistic impression of TOI-813 b

Discovery
- Discovery date: 2019
- Detection method: Transit

Designations
- Alternative names: TIC 55525572 b, 2MASS J04504658-6054196 b, CD-61 970 b

Orbital characteristics
- Semi-major axis: 0.423 AU
- Eccentricity: 0.05
- Inclination: 89.64
- Star: TOI-813

Physical characteristics
- Mass: 42 M_{🜨}

TOI-813 b is a Saturn sized exoplanet orbiting the star TOI-813, a evolved and bright subgiant G-type star located 858 light years away from Earth. The exoplanet is a Neptune like gas giant type planet with 42 M_{🜨} and 6.7 R_{🜨}. In approximately 780 million years, the planet will be engulfed and destroyed by its parent star.

TOI-813 b was discovered as part of the Planet Hunters project.

== Orbit ==
The planet orbits the star TOI-813 at 0.423 AU and an orbital eccentricity of 0.05. TOI-813 b has an orbital inclination of 89.64.
