= 1991 Darwin =

Stony main-belt asteroid

Discovery
- Discovered by: C. U. Cesco; A. R. Klemola
- Discovery site: El Leoncito (Yale–Columbia Southern Station) Félix Aguilar Obs.
- Discovery date: 6 May 1967

Designations
- Named after: Charles Darwin; George Darwin
- Alternative designations: 1967 JL · 1954 UG; 1971 SU_{2}
- Minor planet category: main-belt · Flora

Orbital characteristics
- Epoch 4 September 2017 (JD 2458000.5)
- Uncertainty parameter 0
- Observation arc: 62.44 yr (22,807 days)
- Aphelion: 2.7157 AU
- Perihelion: 1.7829 AU
- Semi-major axis: 2.2493 AU
- Eccentricity: 0.2073
- Orbital period (sidereal): 3.37 yr (1,232 days)
- Mean anomaly: 278.54°
- Mean motion: 0° 17^{m} 31.92^{s} / day
- Inclination: 5.9148°
- Longitude of ascending node: 328.45°
- Argument of perihelion: 345.52°

Physical characteristics
- Dimensions: 4.989±0.371 km 5.02 km (taken); 5.024 km 5.84±1.26 km 6.32±1.28 km
- Synodic rotation period: 4.7±0.2 h
- Geometric albedo: 0.16±0.06; 0.2541; 0.258±0.078; 0.28±0.15
- Spectral type: S
- Absolute magnitude (H): 13.20±0.32 · 13.4 · 13.6 · 13.60±0.07 · 13.86

1991 Darwin, provisional designation 1967 JL, is a stony Florian asteroid from the inner regions of the asteroid belt, approximately 5 kilometres in diameter.

It was discovered on 6 May 1967, by Argentine astronomers Carlos Cesco and Arnold Klemola at the El Leoncito's Yale–Columbia Southern Station of the Félix Aguilar Observatory in Argentina. It was named after both George and Charles Darwin.

== Classification and orbit ==
Darwin is a member of the Flora family, one of the largest groups of stony asteroids in the main-belt. It orbits the Sun in the inner main-belt at a distance of 1.8–2.7 AU once every 3 years and 4 months (1,232 days). Its orbit has an eccentricity of 0.21 and an inclination of 6° with respect to the ecliptic.

It was first observed as 1954 UG at Goethe Link Observatory in 1954, extending the body's observation arc by 13 years prior to its official discovery observation at El Lenoncito.

== Physical characteristics ==
Darwin has been characterized as a common stony S-type asteroid based on its classification to the Flora family.

=== Rotation period ===
In September 1991, a rotational lightcurve of Darwin was obtained from photometric observations by Polish astronomer Wiesław Wiśniewski. Lightcurve analysis gave a rotation period of 4.7 hours with a brightness amplitude of 0.08 magnitude (U=2).

=== Diameter and albedo ===
According to the surveys carried out by the Japanese Akari satellite and NASA's Wide-field Infrared Survey Explorer with its subsequent NEOWISE mission, Darwin measures between 4.989 and 6.32 kilometres in diameter and its surface has an albedo between 0.16 and 0.28.

The Collaborative Asteroid Lightcurve Link adopts Pravec's revised WISE data, that is, an albedo of 0.2541 and a diameter of 5.02 kilometres with an absolute magnitude of 13.6.

== Naming ==
This minor planet was named in memory of English naturalist Charles Darwin (1809–1882), the first to establish the theory of evolution by natural selection. While on research in Argentina, he crossed the Andes relatively near to the Leoncito Astronomical Complex where the minor planet was discovered.

The asteroid also honours George Darwin (1845–1912), his second son who was a noted astronomer for his pioneering application of detailed dynamical analyses to problems of cosmogony and geology. The Darwins are also honoured by the lunar and Martian craters Darwin. The official naming citation was published by the Minor Planet Center on 1 April 1980 (M.P.C. 5282).
