= PH1b =

Circumbinary Neptunian planet orbiting the Kepler-64 star system

PH1b / Kepler-64b
Discovery
- Discovered by: Planet Hunters
- Discovery site: Kepler space telescope
- Discovery date: 15 October 2012
- Detection method: Transit

Orbital characteristics
- Semi-major axis: 0.634 ± 0.011 AU
- Orbital period (sidereal): 138.506+0.107 −0.092 d
- Semi-amplitude: (20.69±0.31)×10^{3}
- Star: Kepler-64 / PH1

Physical characteristics
- Mean radius: 6.18±0.17 R_{🜨}
- Mass: 0.08–0.14 M_{J} (20–50 M_{🜨})
- Temperature: 481 K (208 °C; 406 °F)

PH1b (standing for "Planet Hunters 1"), or by its NASA designation Kepler-64b, is an extrasolar planet found in a circumbinary orbit in the quadruple star system Kepler-64. The planet was discovered by two amateur astronomers from the Planet Hunters project of amateur astronomers using data from the Kepler space telescope with assistance of a Yale University team of international astronomers. The discovery was announced on 15 October 2012. It is the first known transiting planet in a quadruple star system, first known circumbinary planet in a quadruple star system, and the first planet in a quadruple star system found. It was the first confirmed planet discovered by PlanetHunters.org. An independent and nearly simultaneous detection was also reported from a revision of Kepler space telescope data using a transit detection algorithm.

== Star system ==
The giant planet is Neptune-sized, about 20-55 Earth-masses (M_{🜨}). It has a radius 6.2 times that of Earth. The star system is 7200 light years from Earth. The planet orbits a close binary, with a more distant binary orbiting at a distance, forming the quadruple star system. The star system has the Kepler Input Catalogue name KIC 4862625 as well as the designation Kepler-64. The close binary (Aa+Ab) that the planet circles has an orbital period of 20 days. They form an eclipsing binary pair. The two stars are (Aa) 1.384 solar mass (M_{☉}) F-type main-sequence star and (Ab) 0.336 M_{☉} red dwarf. The planet orbits this binary pair in a 138.3-day orbit. The binary pairs have a separation of 1000 AU. A photometric-dynamical model was used to model the planetary system of the close binary pair. The distant binary (Ba+Bb) have a pair separation of 60 AU. The two stars are (Ba) 0.99 M_{☉} G-type main-sequence star and (Bb) 0.51 M_{☉} red dwarf. The quadruple star system has an estimated age of two billion years (2 gigayears). The system is located at right ascension 19^{h} 52^{m} 51.624^{s} declination +39° 57′ 18.36″, so also has a 2MASS catalogue entry of 2MASS 19525162+3957183

== Discovery ==
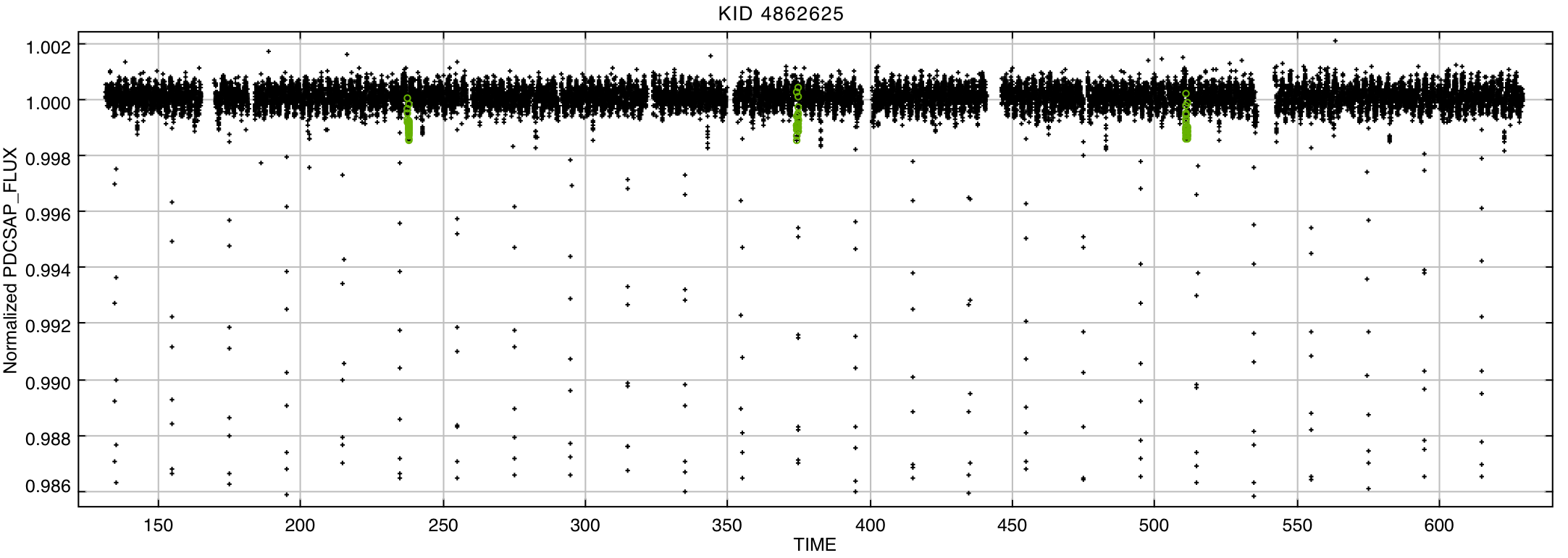
Light curve signaling the discovery of PH1, showing the first three transits of Kepler-64 (KIC 4862625)

Kian Jin Jek (Chinese: 易建仁, son of Jek Yeun Thong), from San Francisco, and Robert Gagliano, from Cottonwood, Arizona, spotted the signature of the planet in the Kepler data, and it was reported through the PlanetHunters.org program run by Dr. Chris Lintott, from Oxford University. Kian Jek first spotted a light dip indicative of a transit in May 2011. JKD reported a second. Robert Gagliano performed a systematic search, and confirmed the second dip, and found a third, in February 2012. Using this, Kian predicted another transit, and found it. The planet was subsequently detected by eclipsing binary timing variation method. At the time of discovery, it was the sixth known circumbinary planet.

== Role as a benchmark system ==
The planet PH1b and Kepler-35b were used as a benchmark system for automated detection algorithms. As a benchmark system PH1 is used to improve the algorithm and to demonstrate improvement in the detection of circumbinary planets.

== See also ==
- List of extrasolar planet firsts
- PH2 b
