= Schild =

Schild is a German surname meaning "shield". People with the surname include:

- Alfred Schild (1921–1977), American physicist
- André Schild (1910–1981), Swiss linguist
- Bernadette Schild (born 1990), Austrian alpine skier
- Christina Schild, Austrian-Canadian actress
- Edi Schild (1919–2008), Swiss cross-country skier
- Erwin Schild (1920–2024), German-Canadian Conservative rabbi and author
- Heinrich Schild (1895–1978), German politician
- Horst Schild (1942–2024), German politician
- Irving Schild (born 1931), American commercial photographer
- Jerry Schild (1954–2012), NASCAR Cup Series driver
- Marlies Schild (born 1981), Austrian alpine skier
- Martina Schild (born 1981), Swiss alpine skier
- Ozer Schild (1930–2006), Danish-born Israeli academic, President of the University of Haifa and President of the College of Judea and Samaria ("Ariel College").
- Rolf Schild (1924–2003), German-born British businessman
- Romuald Schild (1936–2021), Polish archaeologist
- Rudolph Schild (born 1940), American astrophysicist
- Thekla Schild (1890–1991), German architect

== See also ==
- Schild's ladder, in the theory of general relativity, and differential geometry more generally
- Schild regression
- Schild's Ladder, 2002 science fiction novel
- Schildt
