= HD 152843 =

Star in the constellation Hercules

Observation data Epoch J2000 Equinox J2000
- Constellation: Hercules
- Right ascension: 16^{h} 55^{m} 08.35611^{s}
- Declination: +20° 29′ 28.7945″
- Apparent magnitude (V): 8.85±0.01

Characteristics
- Evolutionary stage: Main sequence
- Spectral type: G0
- Apparent magnitude (B): 9.38±0.02
- Apparent magnitude (J): 7.896±0.018
- Apparent magnitude (H): 7.655±0.016
- Apparent magnitude (K): 7.629±0.020
- Variable type: planetary transit

Astrometry
| Radial velocity (R_{v}) | 10.06±0.15 km/s |
| Proper motion (μ) | RA: 14.838±0.010 mas/yr Dec.: 44.635±0.012 mas/yr |
| Parallax (π) | 9.1607±0.0152 mas |
| Distance | 356.0 ± 0.6 ly (109.2 ± 0.2 pc) |

Details
| Mass | 1.15±0.04 M_{☉} |
| Radius | 1.43±0.02 R_{☉} |
| Surface gravity (log g) | 4.19±0.03 cgs |
| Temperature | 6310±100 K |
| Metallicity [Fe/H] | −0.16±0.05 dex |
| Rotation | 5.0±0.9 d |
| Rotational velocity (v sin i) | 8.38±0.50 km/s |
| Age | 3.97±0.75 Gyr |

Other designations
- AG+20 1698, BD+20 3347, Gaia DR1 4564566550698800000, Gaia DR2 4564566554995619072, Gaia DR3 4564566554995619072, HD 152843, SAO 84691, PPM 105343, TOI-2319, TIC 349488688, TYC 1529-224-1, GSC 01529-00224, 2MASS J16550834+2029287, YZ 20 5767

Database references
| SIMBAD | data |
| Exoplanet Archive | data |

HD 152843 (also designated as TOI-2319) is a single star with a pair of close-orbiting exoplanets, located in the northern constellation of Hercules. It is positioned at a distance of 356 light years from the Sun based on parallax measurements, and at that range is too faint to be viewed with the naked eye, having an apparent visual magnitude of 8.85. The system is receding further away with a radial velocity of 10 km/s.

This is a G-type main-sequence star with a stellar classification of G0. It has 1.15 times the mass and 1.43 times the girth of the Sun. Around four billion years of age, HD 152843 is a quiet star, showing very little magnetic activity in its chromosphere. The abundance of iron, a measure of the star's metallicity, is somewhat lower than in the Sun. It is spinning with a projected rotational velocity of 8.4 km/s.

== Planetary system ==
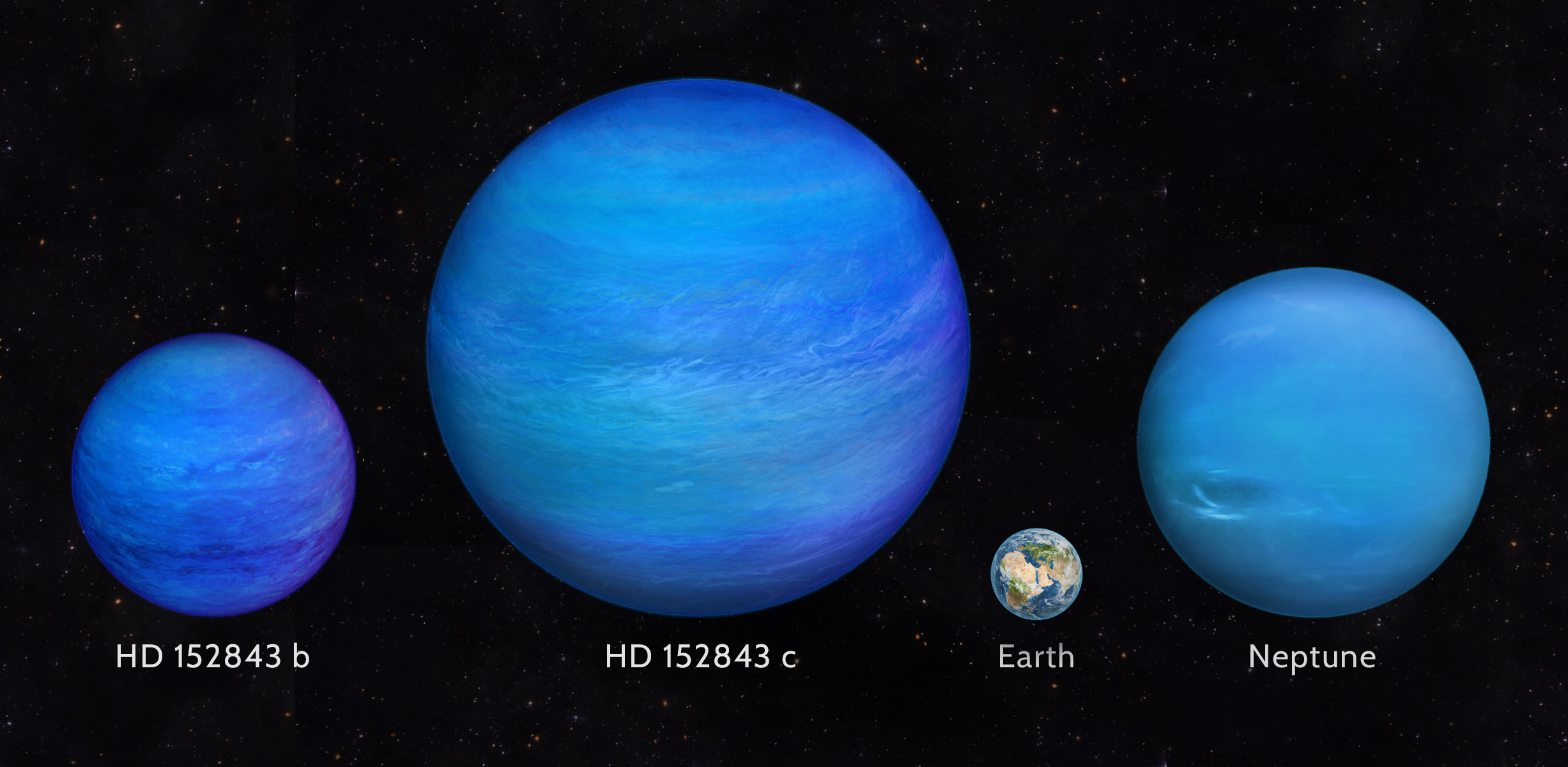
This artist's conception shows a potential appearance of the planets around HD 152843, comparing their size and radius to that of Earth and Neptune.

This star has two confirmed exoplanets orbiting it, being designated HD 152843 b and HD 152843 c. Both were discovered using NASA’s Transiting Exoplanet Survey Satellite (TESS) when they were observed transiting their host star.

HD 152843 b is the closest planet to HD 152843, orbiting its host star in just 11.62 days. The planet has 9.8 Earth masses and 3.1 Earth radii. The planet orbits the star at a distance of 0.105 astronomical units (au), has an orbital eccentricity of 0.05, and has an orbital inclination of 89.3°.

HD 152843 c is the second planet in the star system and farthest planet from its star. It has 9.7 Earth masses and 5.9 Earth radii. It orbits its host star at a speed of 7.1 kilometers a second, with its orbital eccentricity being 0.07 and an orbital inclination of 89.2°. Its low density of 0.253+0.059
−0.057 g⋅cm^{−3} makes it a super-puff planet.

The HD 152843 planetary system
| Companion (in order from star) | Mass | Semimajor axis (AU) | Orbital period (days) | Eccentricity | Inclination | Radius |
|---|---|---|---|---|---|---|
| b | 9.82+1.71 −1.61 M_{🜨} | 0.1049+0.0029 −0.003 | 11.62071+0.000096 −0.000106 | 0.046+0.058 −0.033 | 89.26+0.51 −0.58° | 3.05±0.11 R_{🜨} |
| c | 9.67+1.97 −1.92 M_{🜨} | 0.1482+0.0041 −0.0042 | 19.502104+0.000074 −0.000085 | 0.074+0.072 −0.05 | 89.21+0.53 −0.4° | 5.94+0.18 −0.16 R_{🜨} |
