= Ida Barney =

American astronomer (1886–1982)

- Born: November 6, 1886; New Haven, Connecticut, U.S.
- Died: March 7, 1982 (aged 95); New Haven, Connecticut, U.S.
- Education: Smith College (B.A.); Yale University (Ph.D.)
- Known for: Astrometric measurements of 150,000 stars
- Awards: Annie J. Cannon Award in Astronomy (1952)
- Scientific career
- Fields: Astronomy
- Workplaces: Rollins College; Smith College; Lake Erie College; Yale University Observatory
- Thesis: Line and surface integrals (1911)

Ida Barney (November 6, 1886 – March 7, 1982) was an American astronomer, best known for her 22 volumes of astrometric measurements on 150,000 stars. She was educated at Smith College and Yale University and spent most of her career at the Yale University Observatory. She was the 1952 recipient of the Annie J. Cannon Award in Astronomy.

== Personal life ==
Barney was born on November 6, 1886, in New Haven, Connecticut. Her mother was Ida Bushnell Barney and her father was Samuel Eben Barney. She was an avid birder and the New Haven Bird Club President. After her retirement from Yale, she continued to live in New Haven, where she died on March 7, 1982, aged 95 years old.

== Education ==
In 1908, Barney was graduated from Smith College with a Bachelor of Arts degree. There, she was a member of Phi Beta Kappa and Sigma Xi, national honor societies for students. Three years later, she received her Ph.D. in mathematics from Yale University.

== Scientific career ==
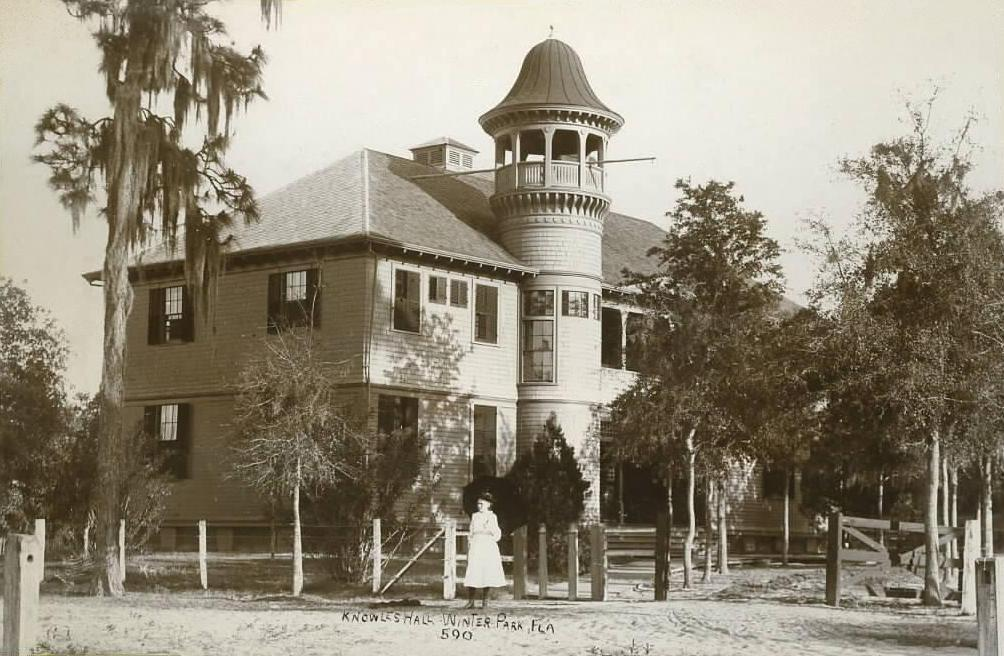
Rollins College, ca.1909

From 1911–1912, just after receiving her Ph.D., Barney was a mathematics professor at Rollins College. At the conclusion of that year, she moved to her alma mater to Smith College, where she was an instructor of mathematics. In 1917, she was hired as a professor at Lake Erie College, where she stayed until 1919. In 1920, she returned to Smith College as an assistant professor. In 1922, the Yale University Observatory appointed Barney as a research assistant, a title she held until 1949, when she was promoted to research associate. The Observatory, like many other university observatories, was allocating significant resources to astronomy, thanks to the development of telescope-mounted cameras. At the beginning of her career in astronomy, Barney worked under Frank Schlesinger; she plotted the position of stars from photographic plates and worked on the calculations of their celestial coordinates from their positions on the plates. The work was tedious, which Schlesinger thought to be suitable for women incapable of theoretical research. Despite this influence, she developed several methods that increased both the accuracy and speed of astronomic measurements, including the use of a machine that automatically centered the photographic plates.

In 1941, when Schlesinger retired, Barney took over full supervision of the cataloguing. Under her direction, the measurements of the photographic plates were completed at the IBM Watson Scientific Laboratory using a new electronic device that advanced the reduction of eye strain and increased accuracy. Her life's work, completed over 23 years, contributed to the Yale Observatory Zone Catalog, a series of star catalogs published by the Yale Observatory for 1939 to 1983, containing approximately 400,000 stars, and influenced the Bright Star Catalogue. Her individual contribution to these star catalogues recorded the position, magnitude, and proper motion of approximately 150,000 stars. Due to its high accuracy, the catalogue is still used today in proper motion studies. She retired from academic life in 1955. She was succeeded by Ellen Dorrit Hoffleit.

== Woman of achievement ==
The Women's Centennial Congress was organized by Carrie Chapman Catt, November 25–27, 1940, to celebrate a century of female progress. To demonstrate those advances, 100 "successful women" were invited to represent the respective fields of study in which they were working in 1940, but that would have been impossible for them in 1840. Barney was listed under "Science" with Margaret Mead and Annie Jump Cannon, among others. The 100 women chosen were "all American, alive and doing jobs that would have been impossible for a woman to undertake in 1840."

== Honors ==
Barney (center) receiving the Annie. J. Cannon Award in Astronomy from Robert R. McMath

While a research associate at the Yale University Observatory, in 1952, Barney was awarded the triennial Annie J. Cannon Award in Astronomy, a prestigious award for women astronomers given by the American Astronomical Society.

Asteroid 5655 Barney, discovered by Ingrid van Houten-Groeneveld, Cornelis Johannes van Houten and Tom Gehrels at Palomar Observatory in 1973, was named in her honor.

== Published works ==
- Barney, Ida; Schilt, Jan (1927). "Discussion of the proper motions in the equatorial Zone". Astronomical Journal. 37: 181. Bibcode:1927AJ.....37..181B. doi:10.1086/104785.
- Barney, Ida; Schilt, Jan (1930). "Analysis of the Yale proper motions in the zones between +50 degrees and +55 degrees and between +55 degrees and +60". Astronomical Journal. 40: 168. Bibcode:1930AJ.....40..168B. doi:10.1086/105000.
- Barney, Ida; Schlesinger, Frank (1938). "An effect of a star's color upon its apparent photographic position". Astronomical Journal. 47: 86. Bibcode:1938AJ.....47...86B. doi:10.1086/105478.
- Barney, Ida; Schlesinger, Frank (1939). "On the accuracy of the proper motions in the General Catalogue Albany". Astronomical Journal. 48: 51. Bibcode:1939AJ.....48...51B. doi:10.1086/105546.
- Barney, Ida; Schlesinger, Frank (1940). "New reductions of astrographic plates with the help of the Yale photographic Catalogues". Astronomical Journal. 49: 39. Bibcode:1940AJ.....49...39B. doi:10.1086/105625. (Note: Scanned issues (1849–1997) from ADS)

== See also ==
- List of minor planets 5001–6000, #5655
- List of minor planets named after people
- Meanings of minor-planet names: 5001–6000
