= Carlos Ulrrico Cesco =

Argentine astronomer

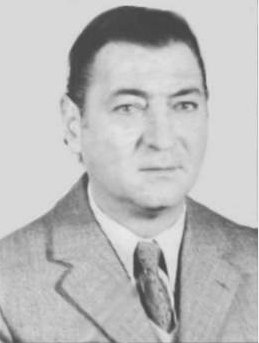
Carlos Ulrrico Cesco

Carlos Ulrrico Cesco (died 1987) was an Argentine astronomer. He lived most of his life in San Juan, Argentina. He was a well-known discoverer of minor planets credited by the Minor Planet Center (MPC) with the discovery of 19 numbered minor planets.

His older brother, Ronaldo P. Cesco, was a mathematician and celestial mechanician and director of the La Plata Observatory. They both studied at the Universidad de la Plata.

== Legacy ==
Asteroids discovered: 19
1770 Schlesinger ^{[A]}	May 10, 1967
1829 Dawson ^{[A]}	May 6, 1967
1867 Deiphobus	March 3, 1971
1917 Cuyo ^{[B]}	January 1, 1968
1919 Clemence ^{[C]}	September 16, 1971
1920 Sarmiento ^{[C]}	November 11, 1971
1958 Chandra	September 24, 1970
1991 Darwin ^{[A]}	May 6, 1967
2308 Schilt ^{[A]}	May 6, 1967
2399 Terradas	June 17, 1971
2504 Gaviola ^{[A]}	May 6, 1967
3833 Calingasta ^{[C]}	September 27, 1971
5299 Bittesini	June 8, 1969
5757 Tichá ^{[A]}	May 6, 1967
8127 Beuf	April 27, 1967
8128 Nicomachus ^{[A]}	May 6, 1967
10450 Girard ^{[A]}	May 6, 1967
11437 Cardalda ^{[C]}	September 16, 1971
(30720) 1969 GB	April 9, 1969
^{A} with A. R. Klemola, ^{B} with A. G. Samuel, ^{C} with J. Gibson

The Carlos Ulrico Cesco Observatory is named after him (formerly known as the Félix Aguilar Observatory).

The outer main-belt asteroid 1571 Cesco, discovered by Miguel Itzigsohn at La Plata Observatory in 1950, was named after Carlos and Ronaldo Cesco. The official naming citation was published by the MPC on 6 June 1982 (M.P.C. 6954).
