= 2308 Schilt =

Minor planet

Discovery
- Discovered by: C. U. Cesco; A. R. Klemola
- Discovery site: El Leoncito (Yale–Columbia Southern Station)
- Discovery date: 6 May 1967

Designations
- Named after: Jan Schilt (astronomer)
- Alternative designations: 1967 JM · 1926 GP; 1930 DR · 1972 TX_{7} 1976 UH_{12} · 1980 VF; 1981 YM
- Minor planet category: main-belt · Eunomia

Orbital characteristics
- Epoch 4 September 2017 (JD 2458000.5)
- Uncertainty parameter 0
- Observation arc: 82.71 yr (30,210 days)
- Aphelion: 2.9873 AU
- Perihelion: 2.1114 AU
- Semi-major axis: 2.5494 AU
- Eccentricity: 0.1718
- Orbital period (sidereal): 4.07 yr (1,487 days)
- Mean anomaly: 117.70°
- Mean motion: 0° 14^{m} 31.56^{s} / day
- Inclination: 14.176°
- Longitude of ascending node: 34.265°
- Argument of perihelion: 233.60°

Physical characteristics
- Dimensions: 13.79±0.57 km 17.51 km (derived); 17.54±0.8 km (IRAS:18); 17.626±0.220 km 17.719±0.098 km
- Synodic rotation period: 9.759±0.002 h 9.767±0.005 h (Note: Mazzone (2012) web: rotation period 9.767±0.005 hours with a brightness amplitude of 0.42 mag and an LCDB quality code of U=3-. See at astrosurf. Summary figures for (2308) Schilt at Collaborative Asteroid Lightcurve Link (CALL))
- Geometric albedo: 0.1001 (derived); 0.1088±0.0335; 0.1094±0.011 (IRAS:18); 0.177±0.024
- Spectral type: SMASS = S · S
- Absolute magnitude (H): 11.8 · 11.9

2308 Schilt, provisional designation 1967 JM, is a stony Eunomia asteroid from the asteroid belt, approximately 17 kilometers in diameter. It was discovered on 6 May 1967, by Argentine astronomer Carlos Cesco together with American astronomer Arnold Klemola at the Yale–Columbia Southern Station at Leoncito Astronomical Complex in Argentina.

== Orbit and classification ==
Schilt is a member of the Eunomia family, a large group of stony asteroids and the most prominent family in the intermediate main-belt. It orbits the Sun in the central main-belt at a distance of 2.1–3.0 AU once every 4 years and 1 month (1,487 days). Its orbit has an eccentricity of 0.17 and an inclination of 14° with respect to the ecliptic. The asteroids observation arc begins with its discovery in 1967. However, the first (unused) precovery was already taken at Heidelberg Observatory in 1921.

== Physical characteristics ==
In the SMASS taxonomy, Schilt has been characterized as a common S-type asteroid.

=== Rotation period ===
A rotational lightcurve was obtained based on photometric observations at the Australian Oakley Southern Sky Observatory in August 2012. The lightcurve showed a period of 9.759±0.002 hours with a brightness amplitude of 0.44 in magnitude (U=3). A previous observation by Argentine astronomer Salvador Mazzone at the Observatorio Astronómico Salvador gave a similar period of 9.767±0.005 with an amplitude of 0.42 in magnitude (U=3-).

=== Diameter and albedo ===
According to the surveys carried out by the Infrared Astronomical Satellite (IRAS) and NASA's Wide-field Infrared Survey Explorer with its subsequent NEOWISE mission, the asteroid measures between 13.8 and 17.7 kilometers in diameter and its surface has an albedo in the range of 0.10–0.17. The Collaborative Asteroid Lightcurve Link derives an albedo of 0.10 and a diameter of 17.5 kilometers.

== Naming ==
This minor planet was named after Dutch–American astronomer Jan Schilt (1894–1982), one of the founders of the discovering Columbia–Yale Southern Station in the early 1960s, for which he collaborated with local astronomer and with Yale's Dirk Brouwer, after whom the minor planet 1746 Brouwer is named. At Columbia University, Schilt's research included the dynamics and structure of galaxies, and improvements in measuring the brightness of stars. The official naming citation was published by the Minor Planet Center on 11 December 1981 (M.P.C. 6531).
