= PH2 =

Star in the constellation Cygnus

PH2 / Kepler-86
Observation data Epoch J2000 Equinox ICRS
- Constellation: Cygnus
- Right ascension: 19^{h} 19^{m} 03.26334^{s}
- Declination: +51° 57′ 45.4099″
- Apparent magnitude (V): 12.699±0.010

Characteristics
- Evolutionary stage: Main sequence
- Spectral type: F9
- Apparent magnitude (J): 11.501±0.023
- Apparent magnitude (H): 11.182±0.03
- Apparent magnitude (K): 11.116±0.022
- Apparent magnitude (B1): 12.34
- Apparent magnitude (R1): 12.62
- B−V color index: 0.072

Astrometry
Radial velocity (R_{v})	−17.79±1.88 km/s
Proper motion (μ)	RA: 3.427 mas/yr Dec.: 16.047 mas/yr
Parallax (π)	2.9134±0.0105 mas
Distance	1,120 ± 4 ly (343 ± 1 pc)
Absolute bolometric magnitude (M_{bol})	5.01+0.12 −0.12 (Note: Calculated based on -2.5 log_{10} of luminosity differences.)

Details
Mass	0.958±0.034 M_{☉}
Radius	0.961+0.016 −0.015 R_{☉}
Luminosity (bolometric)	0.79+0.09 −0.08 L_{☉}
Surface gravity (log g)	4.45±0.02 cgs
Temperature	5711+60 −59 K
Metallicity [Fe/H]	−0.03±0.04 dex
Rotation	22.6 days
Rotational velocity (v sin i)	1.43±0.78 km/s

Other designations
- PH2, Kepler-86, KOI-3663, KIC 12735740, TIC 416279912, 2MASS J19190326+5157453

Database references
SIMBAD	data
KIC	data

PH2, also known as Kepler-86, or KIC 12735740 (2MASS J19190326+5157453), is an F-type main-sequence star 1,120 light-years (340 parsecs) distant within the constellation Cygnus. Roughly the size and temperature of the Sun, PH2 gained prominence when it was known to be the host of one of 42 planet candidates detected by the Planet Hunters citizen science project in its second data release. The candidate orbiting around PH2, known as PH2b, had been determined to have a spurious detection probability of only 0.08%, thus effectively confirming its existence as a planet.

Located in its parent star's habitable zone, PH2b (or Kepler-86b) is a Jupiter-size gas giant which could in theory host a natural satellite suitable for hosting life. The report of the confirmed detection of PH2b was submitted on January 3, 2013. It was discovered by amateur Pole Rafał Herszkowicz using his laptop and access to the Internet project with data from the Kepler space observatory.

== History of detection ==
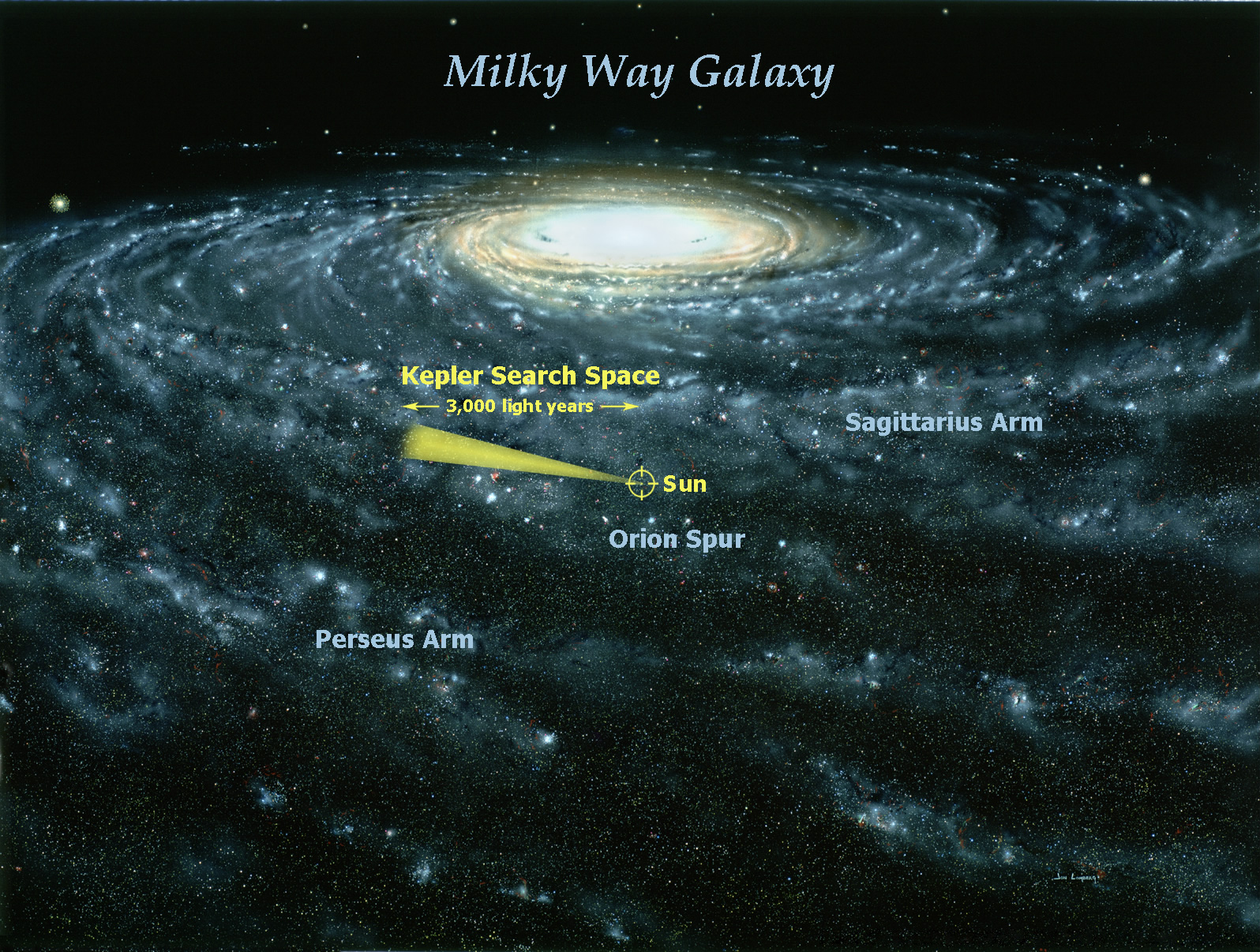
The Kepler search volume, in the context of the Milky Way Galaxy.

PH2 b was detected, along with 42 other planet candidates, in archival data from Kepler by the Planet Hunters project, in which human volunteers analyze the light curves of Kepler target stars, searching for planetary transit signals which may be missed by computer programs. Previous work by Planet Hunters helped to confirm the existence of PH1b, a Neptune-mass planet within a four-star system.

All of the candidates in the study, including PH2b, were identified by citizen scientists Abe J. Hoekstra, Thomas Lee Jacobs, Daryll LaCourse, Hans Martin Schwengler, Rafał Herszkowicz and Mike Chopin among others, with the help of Yale University astronomers. In addition to PH2b itself, twenty other planet candidates were found which are located in the habitable zones of their host stars; however, these have a relatively high probability of spurious detection and may well come from non-planetary sources.

Although the planet's initial detection was made using Kepler data, PH2's stellar spectra, required to rule out background stars or faint companions with planets as sources for the observed transits, were collected using the HIRES instrument at the W. M. Keck Observatory. Results of observations confirmed the existence of PH2b with "99.9 percent confidence."

== Planetary system ==
PH2 is host to one confirmed planet, PH2b, orbiting with a period of about 282 days, placing it and any possible moons in the habitable zone. The temperature in the upper atmosphere of the planet could range from 185 K (−88 °C; −127 °F) to 303 K (30 °C; 86 °F). A moon of PH2b would likely have "a rocky core, plus a greenhouse atmosphere of some sort that could have liquid water on its surface" in the words of the researchers, thus further improving its prospects for habitability.

In 2019, the mass of the planet was measured by radial velocity, showing it to be close in mass to Saturn.

The PH2 planetary system
Companion (in order from star)	Mass	Semimajor axis (AU)	Orbital period (days)	Eccentricity	Inclination (°)	Radius
b	108.81+29.79 −32.29 M_{🜨}	0.824+0.019 −0.017	282.52540+0.00010 −0.00011	0.280+0.121 −0.133	89.915+0.020 −0.022	9.49±0.16 R_{🜨}

== See also ==
- Amateur exoplanet discoveries
- Exomoon
- Habitability of natural satellites
- HIP 41378 f
- Kepler 1625 b I
- Kepler 1708 b I
