= Bright Star Catalogue =

Yale Catalogue of Bright Stars

The Bright Star Catalogue, also known as the Yale Catalogue of Bright Stars, Yale Bright Star Catalogue, or just YBS, is a star catalogue that lists all stars of stellar magnitude 6.5 or brighter, which is roughly every star visible to the naked eye from Earth. The catalog lists 9,110 objects, of which 9,095 are stars, 11 are novae or supernovae (which were "bright stars" only at the time when they were at their peak), and four are non-stellar objects which are the globular clusters 47 Tucanae (designated HR 95) and NGC 2808 (HR 3671), and the open clusters NGC 2281 (HR 2496) and Messier 67 (HR 3515).

The catalogue is fixed in number of entries, but its data is maintained, and it is appended with a comments section about the objects that has been steadily enhanced. The abbreviation for the catalog as a whole is BS or YBS but all citations of stars it indexes use HR before the catalog number, a homage to the catalog's direct predecessor, published in 1908, named the Harvard Revised Photometry Catalogue.

== History ==
The earliest predecessor of the YBSC, titled Harvard Photometry, was published in 1884 by the Harvard College Observatory under the supervision of Edward Charles Pickering, and contained about 4,000 stars. Following its release, Pickering promoted a broader stellar survey for the southern celestial hemisphere, equally as thorough as the Harvard Photometry of 1884. This photometry work was carried out by Solon I. Bailey between 1889 and 1891, leading to the publication of the Revised Harvard Photometry in 1908. The new catalogue contained stars down to magnitude 6.5 in both hemispheres, for which John A. Parkhurst continued work through the 1920s.

The Yale Bright Star Catalogue has been steadily enhanced since the Yale astronomer Frank Schlesinger published the first version in 1930; even though the YBS is limited to the 9110 objects already in the catalog, the data for the objects already listed is corrected and extended, and it is appended with a comments section about the objects. The edition of 1991 was the fifth in order, a version that introduced a considerable enhancement of the comments section, to a little more than the size of the catalogue itself. This most recent edition, in addition to several previous editions, was compiled and edited by Ellen Dorrit Hoffleit of Yale University.

The Harvard Revised Photometry, based on visual observations, has been superseded by photo-electric measurements using band pass filters, most prominently the UBV photometric system. This can differ substantially (up to 1.8 magnitudes) from the older system. Hence many stars brighter than V=6.50 are not in the YBSC (and hundreds of stars in the YBSC are fainter than V=6.50). Dorrit Hoffleit with Michael Saladyga and Peter Wlasuk published in 1983 a Supplement with an additional 2603 stars for which a V magnitude of brighter than 7.10 had been measured at that time.

=== Editions ===
There have been one predecessor, and five editions of the YBS Catalog:

- predecessor – Revised Harvard Photometry (1908)
- 1st edition – Catalogue of Bright Stars (1930)
- 2nd edition – Catalogue of Bright Stars (1940)
- 3rd edition – Catalogue of Bright Stars (1964)
- 4th edition – The Bright Star Catalogue (1982)
  - Supplement – A Supplement to the Bright Star Catalogue (1983)
- 5th edition – The Bright Star Catalogue (1991), which exists only in electronic form, not in book form.

== See also ==
=== Astronomical topics ===
- Photometry
- Star catalog

=== Astronomers ===
- Solon I. Bailey
- Ida Barney
- Ellen Dorrit Hoffleit
- Carlos Jaschek
- Louise Freeland Jenkins
- Edward Charles Pickering
- Frank Schlesinger
