= Schildt =

Schildt is a surname. Notable people with the surname include:

- Göran Schildt (born 1917), Finnish-Swedish author and art historian
- Herbert Schildt (1951–2009), American musician and computing author
- Melchior Schildt (1592/93–1667), German composer and organist
- Peter Schildt (born 1951), Swedish actor
- Runar Schildt (1888–1925), Swedish-speaking Finnish writer
- Wolmar Onni Schildt (1851–1913), Finnish politician
- Wolmar Styrbjörn Schildt, Finish doctor and translator, and linguist, developer of Finnish vocabulary

== See also ==
- Mike Shildt (born 1968), American baseball manager
- Schild
- Schilt
