= Kepler-289 =

Star in Cygnus hosting four planets

Observation data Epoch J2000.0 Equinox J2000.0
- Constellation: Cygnus
- Right ascension: 19^{h} 49^{m} 51.6736^{s}
- Declination: +42° 52′ 58.269″
- Apparent magnitude (V): 14.14

Characteristics
- Evolutionary stage: main sequence
- Spectral type: G2
- Variable type: planetary transit

Astrometry
| Radial velocity (R_{v}) | −18.21±5.60 km/s |
| Proper motion (μ) | RA: 4.815(14) mas/yr Dec.: −0.190(17) mas/yr |
| Parallax (π) | 1.3763±0.0129 mas |
| Distance | 2,370 ± 20 ly (727 ± 7 pc) |

Details
| Mass | 1.08±0.02 M_{☉} |
| Radius | 1.00±0.02 R_{☉} |
| Luminosity | 1.15±0.06 L_{☉} |
| Surface gravity (log g) | 4.47±0.01 cgs |
| Temperature | 5990±38 K |
| Metallicity [Fe/H] | 0.05±0.04 dex |
| Age | 0.65±0.44 Gyr |

Other designations
- PH3, KOI-1353, KIC 7303287, TIC 273234825, 2MASS J19495168+4252582, WISE J194951.68+425258.2

Database references
| SIMBAD | data |
| Exoplanet Archive | data |

Kepler-289 (PH3) is a rotating variable star slightly more massive than the Sun, with a spectral type of G2, 2370 light-years away from Earth in the constellation of Cygnus. It hosts a system of multiple exoplanets.

== Planetary system ==
Kepler-289 hosts three transiting planets, discovered using the Kepler space telescope. Two planets, Kepler-289b and Kepler-289c, were confirmed in 2014 as part of a study using statistical validation to confirm hundreds of Kepler candidates. A third planet, Kepler-289d, was found by the Planet Hunters citizen science project, hence the other designation for the system, PH3.

Different sources present conflicting models of Kepler-289's planetary system. The discovery paper for planet d says that it has an orbital period of 66 days, and that a 330-day candidate is an alias of the true period of planet d. A 2023 follow-up study also reports a 66-day period for planet d. However, a 2025 study reports a 330-day planet, and says that the 66-day signal "is no longer believed to exist in the data". The NASA Exoplanet Archive lists both a 66-day and a 330-day planet, the latter called Kepler-289e, but no literature source claims the existence of more than three planets in the system.

The Kepler-289 planetary system
| Companion (in order from star) | Mass | Semimajor axis (AU) | Orbital period (days) | Eccentricity | Inclination | Radius |
|---|---|---|---|---|---|---|
| b | 3.70+3.79 −1.96 M_{🜨} | 0.21±0.01 | 34.5383±0.0006 | — | 88.98+0.06 −0.07° | 2.49±0.07 R_{🜨} |
| d | 5.33+0.43 −0.42 M_{🜨} | 0.33±0.02 | 66.0282+0.0044 −0.0039 | — | 89.31±0.04° | 3.03±0.08 R_{🜨} |
| c | 0.49±0.02 M_{J} | 0.51±0.03 | 125.8723+0.0035 −0.0021 | — | 89.78±0.04° | 1.002±0.019 R_{J} |
