= TOI-813 =

G-type star

Observation data Epoch J2000 Equinox ICRS
- Constellation: Dorado
- Right ascension: 04^{h} 50^{m} 46.57013^{s}
- Declination: −60° 54′ 19.6171″
- Apparent magnitude (V): 10.322

Characteristics
- Evolutionary stage: subgiant
- Spectral type: G0IV

Astrometry
Radial velocity (R_{v})	1.24±0.30 km/s
Proper motion (μ)	RA: -3.605 mas/yr Dec.: -2.699 mas/yr
Parallax (π)	3.8031±0.0141 mas
Distance	858 ± 3 ly (262.9 ± 1.0 pc)

Details
Mass	1.32±0.06 M_{☉}
Radius	1.94±0.10 R_{☉}
Surface gravity (log g)	3.86±0.14 cgs
Temperature	5907±150 K
Metallicity [Fe/H]	0.10±0.10 dex
Rotational velocity (v sin i)	8.2±0.9 km/s
Age	3.73±0.62 Gyr

Other designations
- CD−61 970, CPD−61 371, PPM 354364, TOI-813, TIC 55525572, TYC 8876-1059-1, 2MASS J04504658-6054196

Database references
SIMBAD	data

TOI-813 (also known as TIC 55525572 and 2MASS J04504658-6054196) is a bright subgiant G-type star located 858 light-years (263 parsecs) away from planet Earth. It is too faint to be seen with the naked eye. TOI-813 has a mass of 1.32 solar masses, a radius of 1.95 solar radii and a luminosity of 4.3 times the solar luminosity.

== Planetary system ==
The star has one known exoplanet orbiting it named TOI-813 b, a Neptune-like gas giant.

The TOI-813 planetary system
Companion (in order from star)	Mass	Semimajor axis (AU)	Orbital period (days)	Eccentricity	Inclination (°)	Radius
b	—	0.423+0.031 −0.037	83.8911+0.0027 −0.0031	0	89.64+0.24 −0.27	6.71±0.38 R_{🜨}
