= Thekla Schild =

German architect (1890–1991)

Schild in 1911

Thekla Schild (1890–1991) was a German architect. In 1913 she became the second woman in Germany to earn a degree in architecture.

== Early life and education ==
Schild was born in Karlsruhe and spent much of her youth in the Black Forest, where her father worked as a civil servant surveyor.

At the age of 12 she became a student at the Girls Grammar School in Karlsruhe, which was founded in 1893 and was among the first institutions of its kind in Germany. Her favourite subjects were mathematics and Greek. She also took music lessons at a conservatory. Her parents had a progressive attitude towards the education of girls. Her mother, herself trained as a teacher and artist, encouraged Thekla's artistic inclinations. She graduated from high school in the spring of 1908.

With only one exception, all of the girls in Schild's final year went on to higher education. She was undecided as to what course of studies to pursue and was leaning towards medicine. As her artistic inclinations and sense of beauty were considered incompatible with the training of doctors and tasks such as the dissection of corpses, her mother suggested she study architecture. Schild found the idea of architecture very attractive, but had doubts as to whether a woman would be awarded a corresponding degree. She also received encouragement from Hermann Billing, professor of architecture at the University of Karlsruhe. Billing expected his students to not only have artistic skills but also be physically fit, a requirement that students would fulfil through their sporting activities.

Encouraged by Billings, Schild applied to the University of Karlsruhe and was accepted. She was the only woman in her study program. After some initial obstacles, she gained the acceptance of her teachers and fellow students. Schild earned the friendship of some of her fellow students and took part in social activities that were sometimes perceived as inappropriate for women in the society of the time. Occasionally her role as the only woman in a male-dominated environment brought complications, such as during an excursion in Switzerland, when one of her professors took a relative so that Schild was not the only female participant.

After her undergraduate studies, Schild went with some classmates for a year to Munich, attracted by the large urban student population and the desire to be independent from their parents. This then-unusual step for a student found the reluctant approval of her parents. In the Bavarian metropolis, Schild took active interest in the social bustle of students, but was occasionally confronted there with narrowing gender role models, such as when neighbors took offence when she received a male visitor in her room. In her spare time she would ski or climb in the Alps.

After her return to Karlsruhe, Schild prepared for graduation. She graduated in December 1913 and was one of the best in her class. She became the first woman in the Grand Duchy of Baden and only the second woman in Germany who was allowed to wear the title of graduate engineer.

Schild recorded her experiences as a student of architecture in memoirs, which are unpublished.

== In popular culture ==
In a 2016 article titled "Unforgetting Women Architects: From the Pritzker to Wikipedia," architectural historian Despina Stratigakos examines the exclusion of female architects, including Schild, from public memory.

== See also ==
- Architecture of Germany
- Women in architecture
