= Frank Schlesinger =

American astronomer

- Born: May 11, 1871; New York City
- Died: July 10, 1943 (aged 72); Old Lyme, Connecticut
- Education: Columbia University
- Known for: Yale Bright Star Catalogue
- Awards: Valz Prize (1926); Gold Medal of the Royal Astronomical Society (1927); Bruce Medal (1929)
- Scientific career
- Fields: astronomy
- Workplaces: Yerkes Observatory

Frank Schlesinger (May 11, 1871 – July 10, 1943) was an American astronomer. His work concentrated on using photographic plates rather than direct visual studies for astronomical research.

== Biography ==
Schlesinger was born in New York City and attended public schools there. He graduated from the College of the City of New York in 1890. He then worked as a surveyor, becoming a special student in astronomy at Columbia in 1894. In 1896, he received a fellowship which enabled him to study full-time, and he received a PhD in 1898. After his graduation, he spent the summer at Yerkes Observatory as a volunteer assisting director George Ellery Hale.

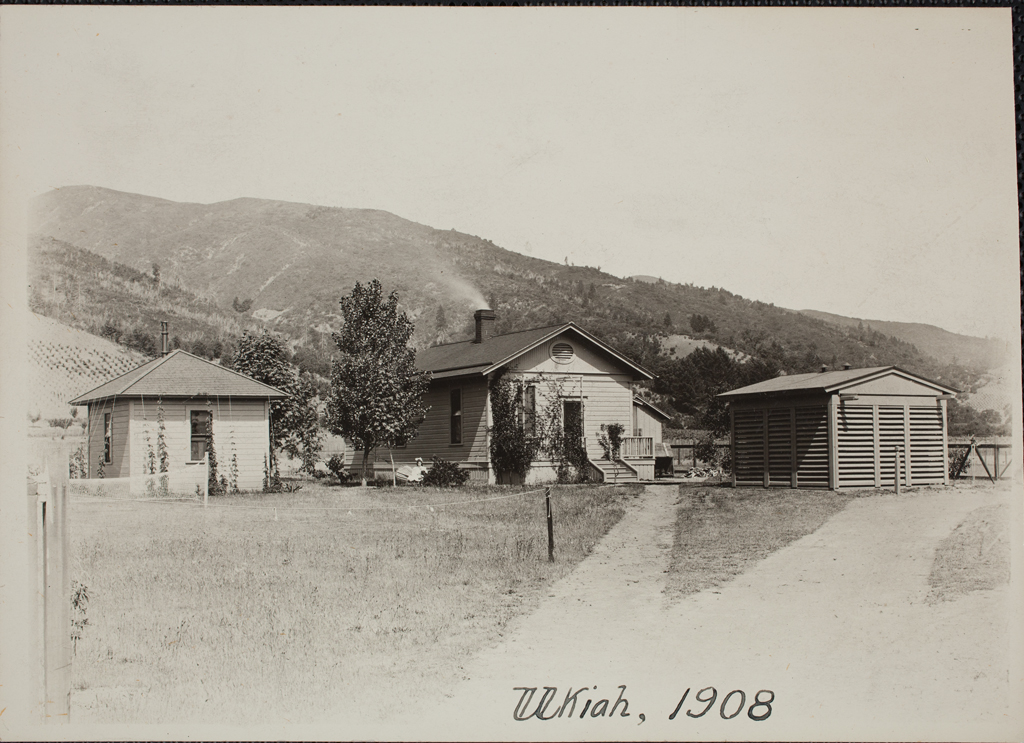
Ukiah Latitude Observatory and house where Schlesinger worked and lived

He was an observer in charge of the International Latitude Observatory, Ukiah, California, in 1898. From 1899 to 1903, he was an astronomer at Yerkes, where he pioneered the use of photographic methods to determine stellar parallaxes. He was director of Allegheny Observatory from 1903 to 1920 and Yale University Observatory from 1920 to 1941.

At Yale he worked extensively with Ida Barney. He compiled and published the Yale Bright Star Catalogue. The first publication of the results of this work started in 1925 (Transactions of the Yale University Observatory, v. 4) and the work concluded in the 1980s. He made major contributions to astrometry. He was elected to the American Philosophical Society (1912), the National Academy of Sciences (1916) and the American Academy of Arts and Sciences and served as president of the American Astronomical Society (1919–1922), and the International Astronomical Union (1932–1935).

Asked how to say his name, he told The Literary Digest "The name is so difficult for those who do not speak German that I am usually called sles'in-jer, to rhyme with messenger. It is, of course, of German origin and means 'a native of Schlesien' or Silesia. In that language the pronunciation is shlayzinger, to rhyme with singer."

== Awards and honors ==
- Valz Prize of the French Academy of Sciences (1926)
- Gold Medal of the Royal Astronomical Society (1927)
- Bruce Medal (1929)
- The crater Schlesinger on the Moon is named after him, as is the asteroid 1770 Schlesinger.

== Family ==
He married Eva Hirsch in 1900 while in Ukiah. They had one child, Frank Wagner Schlesinger, who later directed planetariums in Philadelphia and Chicago. His wife died in 1928, and in 1929 he married Mrs. Katherine Bell (Rawling) Wilcox.

== Published works ==
- Schlesinger at the Fourth Conference International Union for Cooperation in Solar Research at Mount Wilson Observatory, 1910
  Barney, Ida; Schlesinger, Frank (1938). "An effect of a star's color upon its apparent photographic position". Astronomical Journal. 47: 86. Bibcode:1938AJ.....47...86B. doi:10.1086/105478.
- Barney, Ida; Schlesinger, Frank (1939). "On the accuracy of the proper motions in the General Catalogue Albany". Astronomical Journal. 48: 51. Bibcode:1939AJ.....48...51B. doi:10.1086/105546.
- Barney, Ida; Schlesinger, Frank (1940). "New reductions of astrographic plates with the help of the Yale photographic Catalogues". Astronomical Journal. 49: 39. Bibcode:1940AJ.....49...39B. doi:10.1086/105625.
