= Dorrit Hoffleit =

American astronomer (1907–2007)

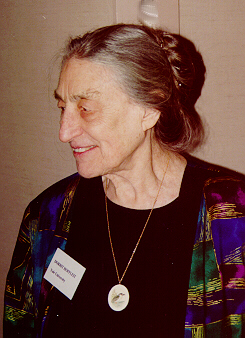
- Born: March 12, 1907; Florence, Alabama
- Died: April 9, 2007 (aged 100); New Haven, Connecticut
- Other name: Ellen Dorrit Hoffleit
- Education: Radcliffe College
- Known for: Bright Star Catalog
- Awards: Caroline Wilby Prize; George Van Biesbroeck Prize (1988)
- Scientific career
- Fields: Astronomy
- Workplaces: Harvard College Observatory, Ballistic Research Laboratory, Harvard University, Yale University, Maria Mitchell Observatory
- Thesis: On the Spectroscopic Determination of Absolute Magnitudes, With Application to the Southern Stars of Types Later than A. (1938)
- Doctoral advisor: Bart Bok

Ellen Dorrit Hoffleit (March 12, 1907 – April 9, 2007) was an American senior research astronomer at Yale University. She is best known for her work in variable stars, astrometry, spectroscopy, meteors, and the Bright Star Catalog. She is also known for her mentorship of many young women and generations of astronomers.

== Life ==
Hoffleit's interest in astronomy began with the 1919 Perseid meteor shower that she saw with her mother. In 1928, she graduated cum laude with a B.A. in mathematics. She then went on to work for the Harvard College Observatory, searching for variable stars. In 1938, she was awarded a Ph.D. in astronomy from Radcliffe College and was subsequently hired, in 1948, as an astronomer at Harvard University. She remained at Harvard until 1956 when she moved to Yale University. She remained at Yale until retirement in 1975.

At Yale she followed in the footsteps of Ida Barney, taking over her astrometric work, and of whom she later wrote "To know [her] was a pleasure, inspiration, and privilege, both at work and socially." Hoffleit also served as director of the Maria Mitchell Observatory on Nantucket Island from 1957 to 1978, where she ran summer programs (May–October) for more than 100 students, many of whom went on to successful careers in astronomy. In her final years at Yale, Hoffleit taught basic courses in astronomy to undergraduates. Her passionate lectures in Davies Hall, usually with over 100 students, inspired and awed them. She engendered a lifelong interest in astronomy for young people, many of whom were just satisfying a prerequisite to their undergraduate degrees.

During the mid 1950s, Hoffleit consulted for the U.S. Army's Ballistic Research Laboratories in "Doppler reductions".

She was the main editor of the Yale Bright Star Catalogue. The Catalogue is a compendium of information on the 9,110 brightest stars in the sky. She also co-authored The General Catalogue of Trigonometric Stellar Parallaxes, containing precise distance measurements to 8,112 stars, information critical to understanding the kinematics of the Milky Way galaxy and the evolution of the solar neighborhood. With Harlan J. Smith, Hoffleit discovered the optical variability of the first-discovered quasar 3C 273.

In 1988, Hoffleit was awarded the George Van Biesbroeck Prize by the American Astronomical Society for a lifetime of service to astronomy. On March 7-8, 1997, Yale University hosted a symposium in honor of Hoffleit's 90th birthday, dedicated to her nearly 70-year career.

Hoffleit turned 100 on March 12, 2007, and died a month later from complications of cancer.

== See also ==
- Ida Barney
- Cora G. Burwell
