= Yale University Observatory =

Observatory in Connecticut, US

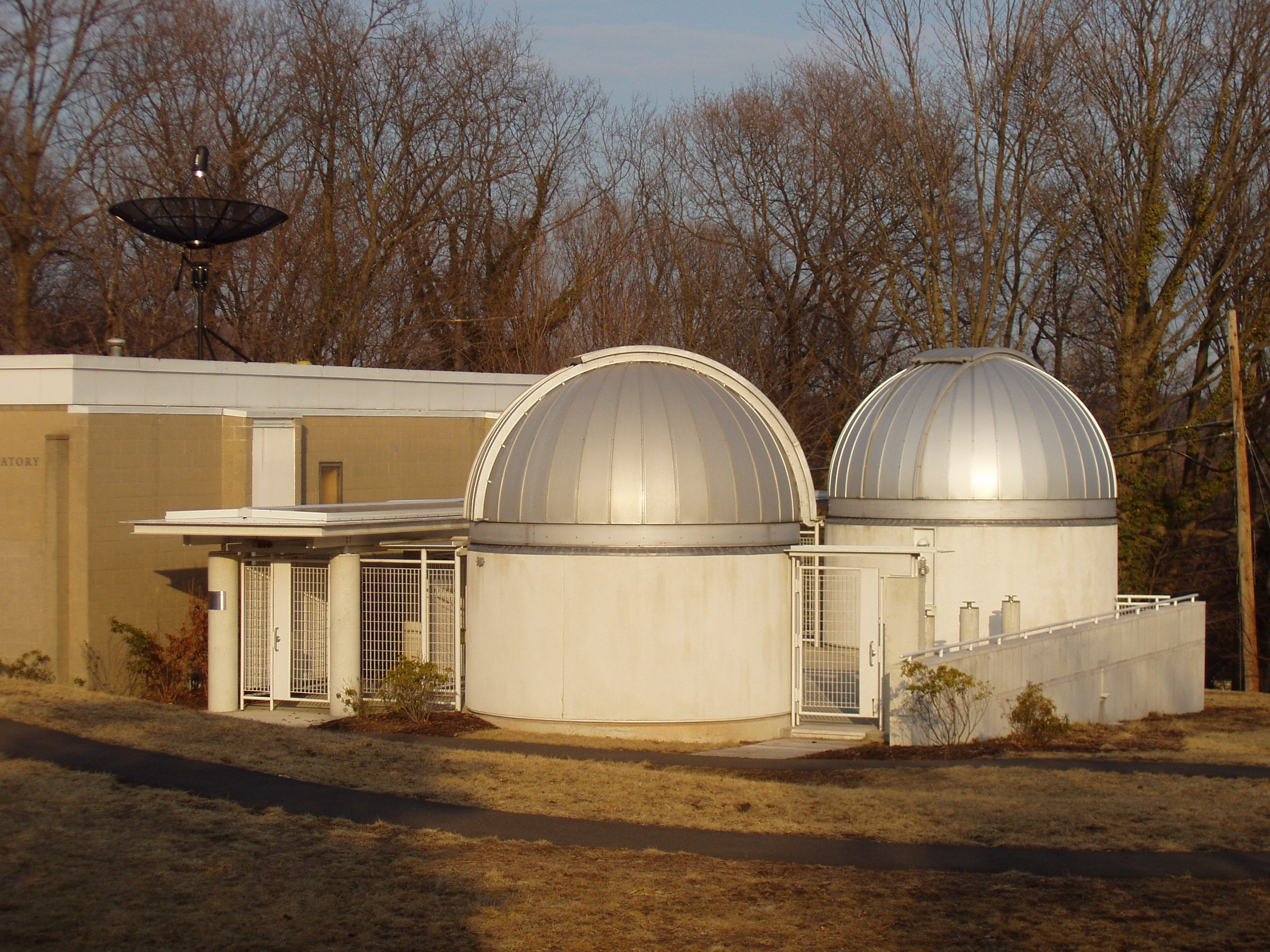
- Leitner Family Observatory.
- Alternative names: Leitner Family Observatory and Planetarium
- Organization: Yale University
- Location: New Haven, Connecticut, USA
- Coordinates: 41.3210°N 72.9220°W
- Altitude: 38 m (125 ft)
- Established: 1830
- Website: leitnerobservatory.yale.edu

Telescopes
- Meade Telescope: LX200 12" reflector
- Grubb Telescope: Refractor

The Yale University Observatory, also known as the Leitner Family Observatory and Planetarium, is an astronomical observatory owned and operated by Yale University, and maintained for student use. It is located in Farnham Memorial Gardens near the corner of Edwards and Prospect Streets, New Haven, Connecticut.

In the 21st century, the Yale Student Observatory, the Leitner observatory also has public outreaches and supports astronomy for students of the college. However, the Yale Observatory traces its history back to being one of the first formal institutions for astronomical observation in the United States, dating to the 1830s.

== History ==
In 1828 Sheldon Clark donated 1200 US dollars to Yale to procure a Dollond refracting telescope.

Yale's first observatory, the Atheneum, was founded in 1830, situated in a tower. From 1830 it housed Yale's first refractor, a 5-inch (130 mm) Dollond donated by Sheldon Clark. It was the largest in the United States at the time. With this telescope Olmsted and Elias Loomis made the first American sighting of the return of Halley's Comet on 31 August 1835. (It had been seen in Europe on 6 August, but no news of this had reached the United States.) The telescope was mounted on casters and moved from window to window, but it could not reach altitudes much over 30 deg above the horizon.

In 1870, a cylindrical turret was added above the tower, so that all altitudes could be reached. In the same year a 9-inch Alvan Clark refractor was mounted in the observatory. The building was demolished in 1893 and the telescope is now at the Smithsonian Institution in Washington, D.C.

The observatory, in the turret (modelled after the gun turret of the ironclad ship USS Monitor), housed a 9-inch (230 mm) Alvan Clark refractor donated by Joseph E. Sheffield. The telescope was later housed in the dome on Bingham Hall (the dome later converted to a small planetarium, and now used as an experimental aquarium).

An 8-inch (200 mm) telescope financed by E.M. Reed of New Haven was first used for photographing the Sun during the Transit of Venus on December 6, 1882.

The observatory also possessed a heliometer, ordered from Repsold and Sons by H. A. Newton in 1880, delivered in time for measurements of the Transit of Venus on December 6, 1882 for determination of solar parallax. This is the same type of instrument that Friedrich Bessel used in 1838 for the first significant determination of a stellar parallax (of the star 61 Cygni). Under the direction of W. L. Elkin from 1883 to 1910 the heliometer yielded (according to Frank Schlesinger) the most (238) and the best parallaxes obtained before the advent of photographic astrometry.

In the late 1890s, W. L. Elkin built two batteries of cameras equipped with rotating shutters for obtaining the velocities as well as the heights of meteors, pioneering work in the study of meteors.

The Loomis Tower on Canner Street, erected in 1923 in memory of Elias Loomis (1811–1889), was at the time the largest polar telescope in America. The installation was originally designed for the comfort of the observer who sat at the eyepiece in a warm room at the top of the tower. The tube (beneath the stairs) was parallel to the polar axis of the Earth. The building at the base of the tower had a sliding roof and housed a 30-inch (760 mm) optical flat coelostat mirror driven equatorially and reflecting light from any unobscured part of the sky through both a 15-inch (380 mm) photographic and a 10-inch (250 mm) visual guide telescope, both of the same focal length, 600 inches.

In 1945, the telescope was reversed, with the 15-inch (380 mm) objective at the top, the plate holder at the foot of the tube. The telescope was thus rigidly mounted for photographing the polar region only, for the purpose of investigating the wobbling of the axis of rotation of the Earth and redetermining the constants of precession and nutation.

The Loomis Telescope was moved to Bethany, Connecticut in 1957, to continue monitoring the apparent motion of the axis of the Earth. Carol Williams analyzed plates for her Ph.D. thesis, 1967. She found apparent motions largely correlated with tidal disturbances of the Earth's crust.

The observatory was renamed as the Leitner Family Observatory and Planetarium in 2008. The observatory now uses a refurbished 8-inch Reed refractor for visual observations of planets and stars. It also includes two Ash domes housing a 16" RCOS telescope and a refurbished refractor from the Grubb Telescope Company (originally purchased to observe the 1882 transit of Venus). Detectors include an SBIG ST-9E CCD camera and a DSS-7 spectrograph. There is an observing deck between the domes. The observatory also houses a digital planetarium theater, which uses a Spitz SciDomeHD projection system.

== See also ==
- List of astronomical observatories
- List of planetariums
- Ida Barney
- Ellen Dorrit Hoffleit
- List of the largest optical telescopes in North America
