= TOI-1338 =

Binary star system in the constellation Pictor

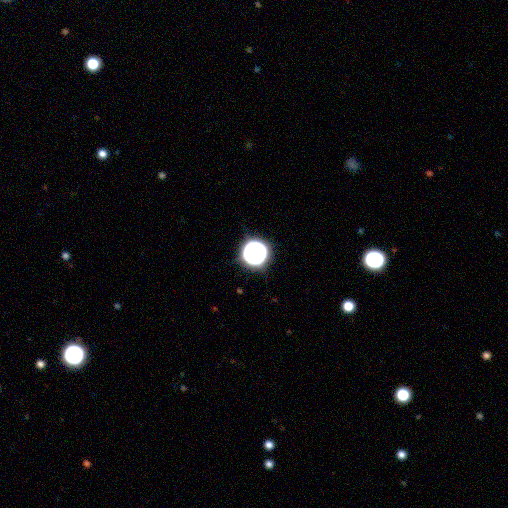
- TOI-1338 (center) photographed by SkyMapper in November 2014; Credit: SkyMapper

Observation data Epoch J2000 Equinox ICRS
- Constellation: Pictor
- Right ascension: 06^{h} 08^{m} 31.968^{s}
- Declination: −59° 32′ 28.08″
- Apparent magnitude (V): 11.72

Characteristics
- Evolutionary stage: Main sequence
- Spectral type: F8V + M
- Variable type: Eclipsing

Astrometry
Radial velocity (R_{v})	23.56±5.34 km/s
Proper motion (μ)	RA: −12.057 mas/yr Dec.: +34.513 mas/yr
Parallax (π)	2.4752±0.0099 mas
Distance	1,318 ± 5 ly (404 ± 2 pc)

Orbit
Period (P)	14.6085659+0.0000062 −0.0000057 d
Semi-major axis (a)	0.1321+0.0024 −0.0025 AU
Eccentricity (e)	0.155489+0.000011 −0.000010
Inclination (i)	90.403+0.045 −0.047°
Argument of periastron (ω) (secondary)	117.7638+0.0042 −0.0041°
Semi-amplitude (K_{1}) (primary)	21.619±0.007 km/s

Details

TOI-1338 A
Mass	1.0936±0.0072 M_{☉}
Radius	1.313±0.0038 R_{☉}
Luminosity	2.089±0.098 L_{☉}
Surface gravity (log g)	4.0±0.08 cgs
Temperature	6,031±46 K
Metallicity [Fe/H]	+0.01±0.05 dex
Rotation	19±3 d
Rotational velocity (v sin i)	3.6±0.6 km/s
Age	6.0±0.3 Gyr

TOI-1338 B
Mass	0.3069±0.0012 M_{☉}
Radius	0.30582±0.00094 R_{☉}
Luminosity	0.0091±0.0016 L_{☉}
Temperature	3,220±135 K

Other designations
- TOI-1338, TIC 260128333, TYC 8533-950-1, 2MASS J06083197-5932280, BEBOP-1, EBLM J0608-59, RAVE J060832.0-593228

Database references
SIMBAD	data
Exoplanet Archive	data

TOI-1338 (also known as BEBOP-1 or EBLM J0608-59) is an eclipsing binary star system located in the constellation Pictor, about 1,300 light-years (400 pc) from Earth. The binary system consists of a large, F-type main-sequence star, and a small, red dwarf star. Viewed from Earth, TOI-1338 appears at an apparent magnitude of 11.7, which is too faint to be seen with the naked eye. It is known for hosting two circumbinary exoplanets: TOI-1338 b as a Saturn-sized super-puff planet, and TOI-1338 c as a Saturn-mass gas giant planet.

== Location and brightness ==
TOI-1338 is located in the constellation Pictor, about 59 and a half degrees south of the celestial equator. When viewed from Earth in visible light, it appears as a single star (Note: The two stars orbit too close to each other to be resolved individually in images. See Figure 6 in Kostov et al. (2020).) with an apparent magnitude of 11.7—too faint to be seen with the naked eye or a small telescope. According to the latest parallax measurements by the Gaia satellite (as of 2020), the distance of TOI-1338 from Earth 1,318 ± 5 light-years (404 ± 2 parsecs). (Note: Gaia's Early Data Release 3 (EDR3) gives a parallax of 2.4752±0.0099 milliarcseconds for TOI-1338. Parallax can be converted into distance via the formula: $d_{pc} {{=}} \frac{1}{p_{arcsec}}$, where $d_{pc}$ is the star's distance in parsecs and $p_{arcsec}$ is the star's parallax in arcseconds.) The NASA Exoplanet Archive gives a slightly smaller distance of 1,302 ± 10 ly (399 ± 3 pc). The star system does not appear reddened (very low extinction of E(B–V)=0.0036±0.0018), which implies there is very little interstellar dust between it and Earth.

As of 2026, TOI-1338 is the brightest star system known to have at least two transiting circumbinary planets. For this reason, astronomers consider TOI-1338 a favorable target for observing its planet's transits via transmission spectroscopy, which would enable the determination of the planet's atmospheric composition.

== Observational history ==
TOI-1338 was first catalogued by the Hipparcos satellite during the 1990s, and published in the Tycho-2 (TYC) Catalogue in 2000. The star was found to be periodically eclipsing when it was observed by the Wide Angle Search for Planets (WASP) during the 2000s. However, the star's eclipses were initially mistaken for transits by a hot Jupiter exoplanet. Upon further examination by the Eclipsing Binary, Low Mass (EBLM) project in 2009, the star became recognized as an eclipsing binary system and was given the designation EBLM J0608-59.

Under the EBLM project, the star system received extensive observations from telescopes in Chile during 2009–2022, with the goal of characterizing the physical properties of its two stars. During that time, two other independent projects had begun observing the star system: the Binaries Escorted By Orbiting Planets (BEBOP) project in 2014, and the Transiting Exoplanet Survey Satellite (TESS) in 2018. (Note: TOI-1338 was observed by TESS while it was observing its first twelve sectors (areas) of the sky. TESS began observing its first sector in July 2018.) The star system became known as TOI-1338 ("TOI" standing for "TESS Object of Interest") in 2020, when astronomers announced the discovery of the first exoplanet orbiting it. The other designation, BEBOP-1, was given to the star system in 2023, when astronomers of the BEBOP project announced the discovery of a second planet orbiting it.

The James Webb Space Telescope (JWST) is scheduled to observe TOI-1338 on 24 and 25 September 2026, when the inner planet of TOI-1338 is predicted to transit both stars. (Note: The description for JWST's TOI-1338 observing program mentions that TOI-1338 b will transit its larger parent star between the dates BJD 2461307.704 and 2461308.577 (2026 September 24 04:54 UT to 25 01:50 UT). TOI-1338 b will also transit its smaller parent star between BJD 2461308.583 and 2461308.856 (2026 September 25 02:00 UT to 08:33 UT).) JWST will observe the transit using transmission spectroscopy, which could determine the composition of the planet's atmosphere. If successful, these observations will provide the first characterization of a circumbinary exoplanet's atmosphere.

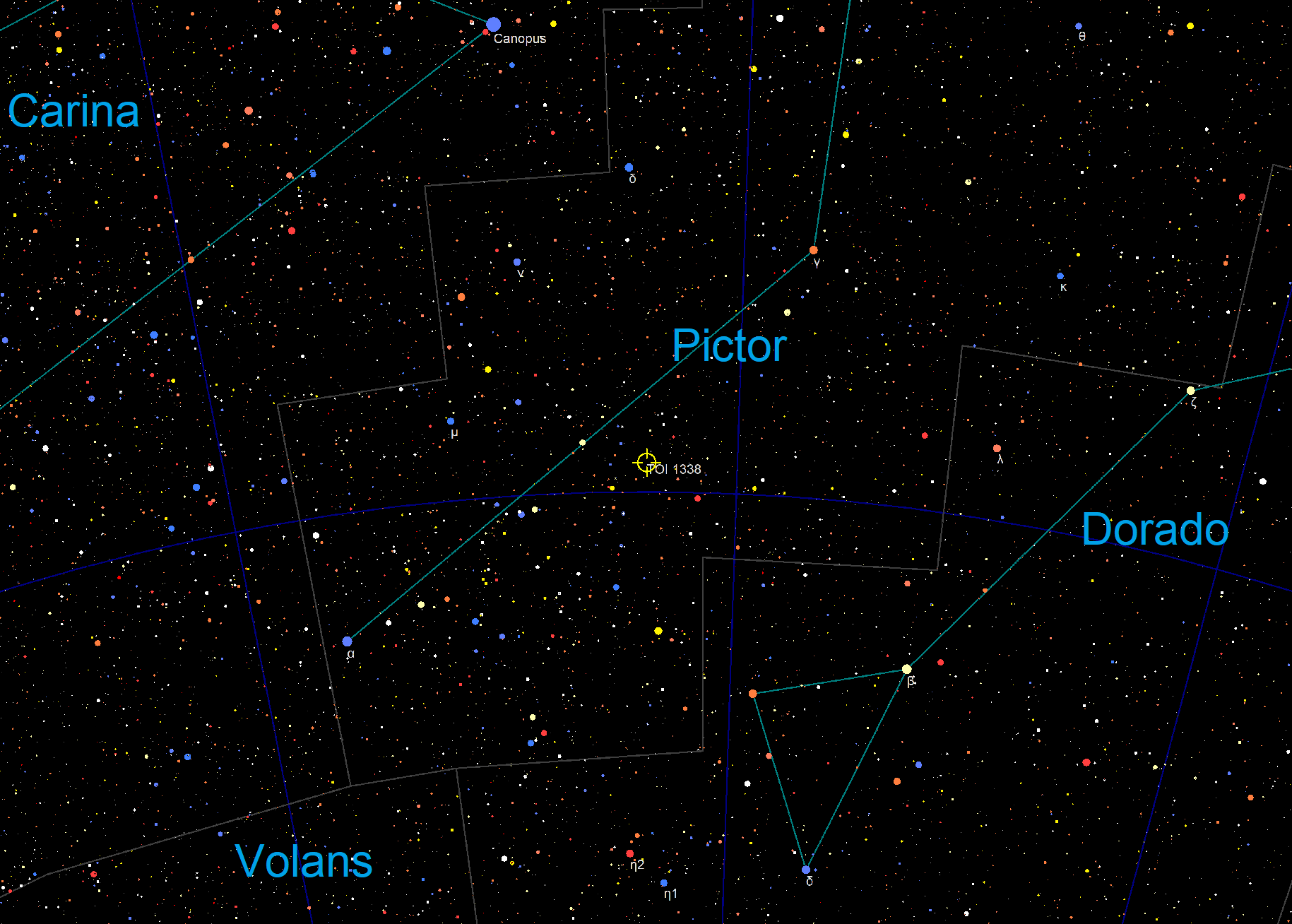
Location of TOI-1338 (yellow circle) in the constellation Pictor

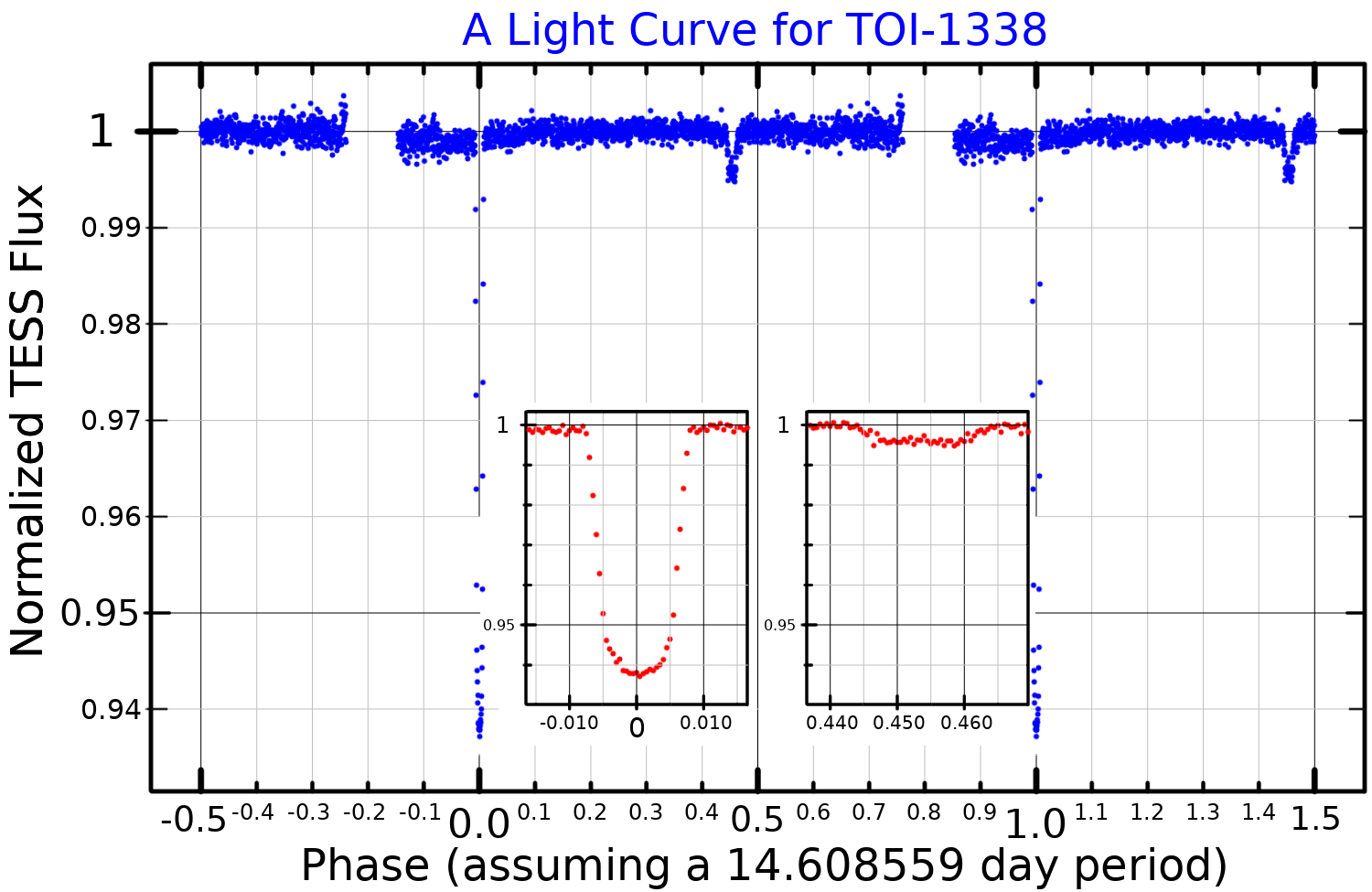
A light curve for TOI-1338, plotted from TESS satellite data. The inset plots show the primary and secondary eclipses on an expanded scale.

== Binary system ==
=== Physical characteristics ===
TOI-1338 is a single-lined spectroscopic binary system, consisting of an F-type star and a red dwarf of spectral type M. The red dwarf is about nine magnitudes fainter than the primary star and cannot be detected in the spectrum.

The primary star of the binary system, A, is hotter (temperature 6031 K), brighter (luminosity 2.1 L_{☉}), larger (radius 1.32 R_{☉}, and more massive (1.1 M_{☉}) than the Sun. The secondary, B, is cooler (temperature 3300 K), dimmer (luminosity 0.009 L_{☉}), smaller (radius 0.31 R_{☉}, and less massive (0.31 M_{☉}) than the Sun. The system has an age of six billion years.

=== Orbit ===
The two stars orbit each other every 14.6 days and are mutually separated by an average distance of about 0.13 astronomical units (20 million km or 12 million mi). The orbit of the two stars is inclined at 89.7° to the plane of the sky (so edge-on) and both primary and secondary eclipses can be observed, although the brightness changes are very small. The primary eclipse occurs when the hotter primary star is partially occulted by the cooler secondary. It lasts about five hours and the brightness decreases by about 4%. The secondary eclipses occur when the cooler star is occulted by the hotter star. They also last about five hours but the brightness drops by less than half a percent.

== Planetary system ==
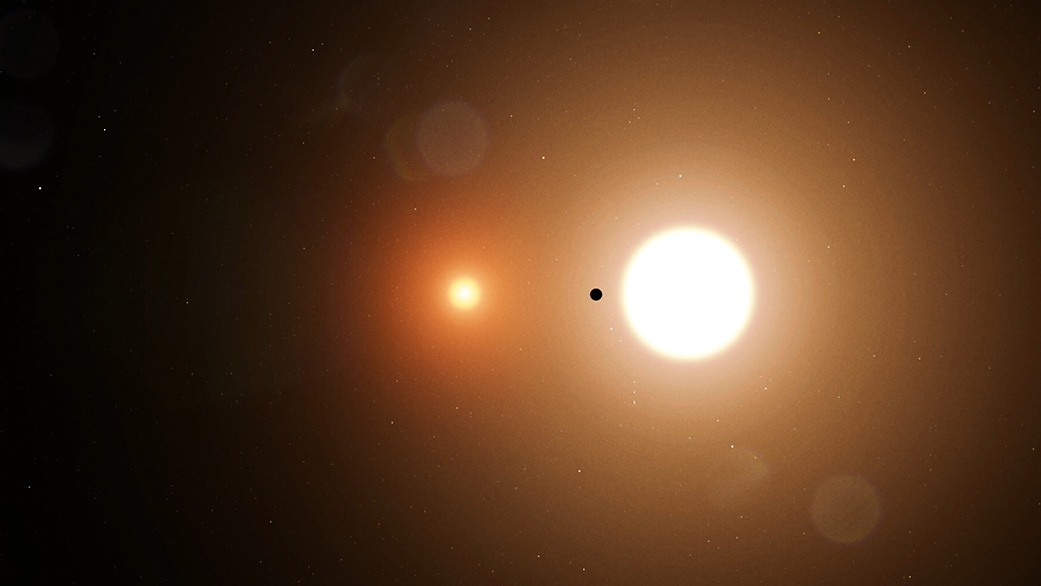
Artistic representation of TOI-1338 system

The planet TOI-1338 b is between Neptune and Saturn in size, and has an orbit that is within ~1° coplanar with the binary. Its mass is estimated to be roughly 11 times that of Earth, indicating a low density similar to that of circumbinary planet Kepler-47c.

The spin of the primary star aligns with the orbits of the binary and the planet (spin-orbit angle β = 2.8°±17.1°). This is the second time the Rossiter–McLaughlin effect was measured for a star hosting a circumbinary planet. Kepler-16 was the first system with such a measurement. The measurement of the alignment for TOI-1338 suggests that the planet formed from a single circumbinary disk.

TOI-1338 c, or BEBOP-1c, is a gas giant about 75 times the mass of Earth. It is also coplanar (or nearly so) with the binary stars and planet b.

Two views of the TOI-1338 system. Left: Edge-on view as seen from Earth, with TOI-1338 b depicted transiting the larger star. Right: Top view, with planets, instability zone, and habitable zone (HZ) labeled.

The TOI-1338 planetary system
Companion (in order from star)	Mass	Semimajor axis (AU)	Orbital period (days)	Eccentricity	Inclination (°)	Radius
b	11.3±2.1 M_{🜨}	0.4607+0.0084 −0.0088	95.4001+0.0062 −0.0056	0.0331+0.0022 −0.0021	90.494+0.013 −0.014	7.661±0.053 R_{🜨}
c	75.4+4.0 −3.6 M_{🜨}	0.794±0.016	215.79+0.46 −0.51	0.037+0.032 −0.026	97.0+6.7 −6.8	—

== See also ==
- Circumbinary planet
- Kepler-16 – eclipsing binary star with the first discovered circumbinary exoplanet
- Kepler-47 – an eclipsing binary star system with multiple circumbinary gas giant planets
- Kepler-64 – a quadruple star system with a circumbinary gas giant
