= TOI-1338 b =

Circumbinary exoplanet orbiting TOI-1338

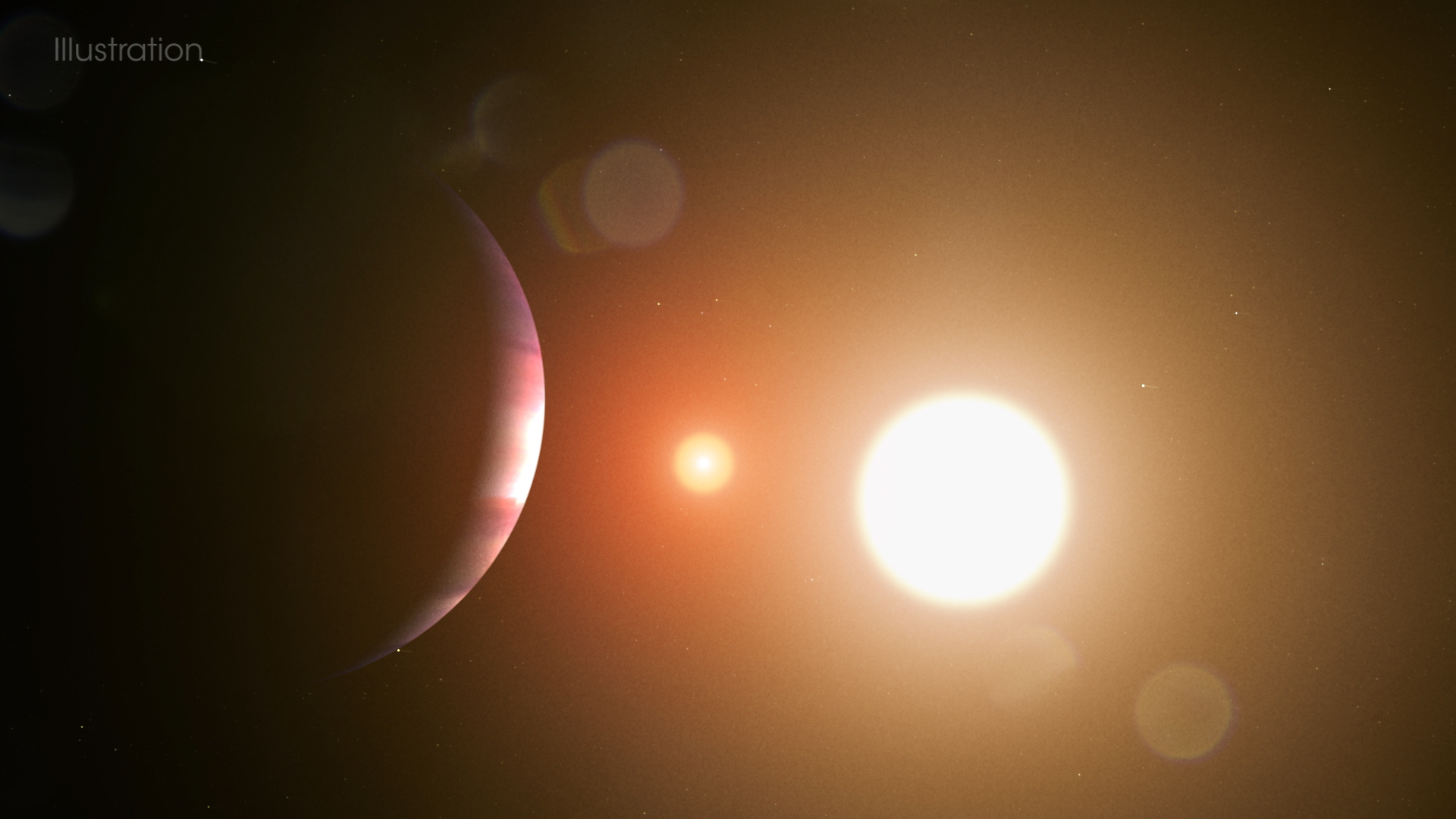
- Artist's rendition of TOI-1338 b as a gas giant planet illuminated by its two parent stars

Discovery
- Discovered by: Wolf Cukier (TESS)
- Discovery date: Summer 2019 (discovered); January 2020 (announced)
- Detection method: Transit

Designations
- Alternative names: BEBOP-1 b; EBLM J0608-59 b

Orbital characteristics
- Epoch BJD 2458300.0 (30 June 2018 12:00 UT) (Note: The reference epoch of BJD 2458300.0 corresponds to the Universal Time (UT) date of 30 June 2018 12:00 UT, which is approximately 90 days before the first observed transit by TOI-1338 b in TESS Sector 3.)
- Semi-major axis: 0.4607+0.0084 −0.0088 AU
- Eccentricity: 0.0331+0.0022 −0.0021
- Orbital period (sidereal): 95.4001+0.0062 −0.0056 d
- Inclination: 90.494°+0.013° −0.014° (wrt sky); 0.127°+0.025° −0.024° (wrt binary orbit)
- Argument of perihelion: 71.9°+1.9° −1.8°
- Semi-amplitude: 1.0–1.5 m/s
- Star: TOI-1338

Physical characteristics
- Mean radius: 7.661±0.053 R_{🜨} (0.6835±0.0047 R_{J})
- Mass: 11.3±2.1 M_{🜨} (0.0355+0.0066 −0.0067 M_{J})
- Mean density: 0.137±0.026 g/cm^{3}
Surface temp.	min	mean	max
Kelvin	603	630	659

TOI-1338 b (also known as BEBOP-1 b or EBLM J0608-59 b) is a Saturn-sized exoplanet orbiting the binary star system TOI-1338. It is a circumbinary planet, meaning it orbits both stars. The planet and its two stars are located in the constellation Pictor, about 1,300 light-years (400 parsecs) from Earth. It is the innermost planet of the TOI-1338 planetary system, orbiting the stars' center of mass every 95 days at an average distance of 0.46 astronomical units (AU; 69 million km or 43 million mi). The planet has an average temperature of 630 K (357 °C; 674 °F). When viewed from Earth, the planet transits or passes in front of its parent stars and blocks out some of their light, allowing it to be detected by telescopes.

TOI-1338 b was first detected by the Transiting Exoplanet Survey Satellite (TESS) in 2018 and recognized in 2019 by teenage NASA intern Wolf Cukier. It was the first circumbinary exoplanet discovered in TESS observations. Observations have shown that the planet has a radius close to Saturn's and a mass smaller than Uranus's, which gives it a very low density of around 0.14 g/cm^{3}. This low density makes TOI-1338 b as a super-puff, a type of exoplanet thought to have a small core surrounded by a substantial amount of gas. Although the composition of TOI-1338 b is currently unknown, the James Webb Space Telescope is expected to determine the composition of its atmosphere with observations to be made in September 2026. (Note: The description for JWST's TOI-1338 observing program mentions that TOI-1338 b will transit its larger parent star between the dates BJD 2461307.704 and 2461308.577 (2026 September 24 04:54 UT to 25 01:50 UT). TOI-1338 b will also transit its smaller parent star between BJD 2461308.583 and 2461308.856 (2026 September 25 02:00 UT to 08:33 UT).)

== Discovery ==
TOI-1338 b was first observed by the Transiting Exoplanet Survey Satellite (TESS) during routine observations of the sky beginning in 2018. (Note: The TOI-1338 star system was observed by TESS while it was observing its first twelve sectors (areas) of the sky. TESS began observing its first sector in July 2018.) TESS detected the planet when it transited a star and temporarily dimmed its brightness, repeating every time it orbits the star. The star system where the planet was found, TOI-1338, is an eclipsing binary system containing two stars that revolve around each other and periodically eclipse from Earth's point of view. Due to the eclipsing binary nature of the star system, their eclipses often obscure the planet's transits and their orbital motion causes the planet's transits to occur and last irregularly. Finding these hidden planet transits posed a challenge for computer algorithms at the time, so astronomers resorted to visually inspecting the TESS data by eye.

Wolf Cukier, a 17-year-old attending Scarsdale High School in New York at the time, joined the NASA Goddard Space Flight Center in 2019 to work as a summer intern for his mentors Ravi Kopparapu and Veselin Kostov. Cukier was tasked with finding circumbinary planet transits in TESS data flagged by volunteers of the online Planet Hunters TESS citizen science project. On his third day of interning, while visually inspecting TESS observations of TOI-1338, Cukier found an unknown transit that did not line up with the star's eclipses. Cukier suspected that the transit was caused by a planet and alerted Kostov of his finding, who then confirmed it with the help of astronomers Jeremy Orosz, Adina Feinstein and Bill Welsh. Additional transits by the planet were found in TESS data, and the planet's gravitational influence on its parent stars was detected in archival radial velocity measurements by the La Silla Observatory.

The discovery of the planet, now known as TOI-1338 b, was announced on 6 January 2020 at the 235th American Astronomical Society meeting in Honolulu, Hawaii, becoming the first circumbinary planet discovered in TESS data. Cukier, his mentors, and various collaborators co-authored a paper describing the discovery, which was published in The Astronomical Journal in May 2020.

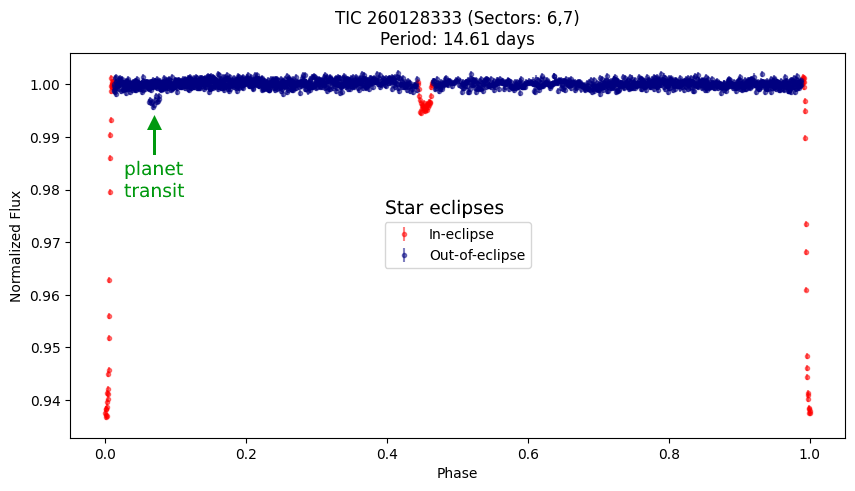
TESS light curve plotting the overall brightness of the TOI-1338 system over time (in terms of phase, or fraction of the stars' orbital period). Star eclipses are highlighted in red and TOI-1338 b's transit is indicated by the green arrow.

Animation showing how TOI-1338 b dims its parent stars as it passes, or transits, in front of them. The overall brightness of the two stars is plotted over time below.

== Name ==
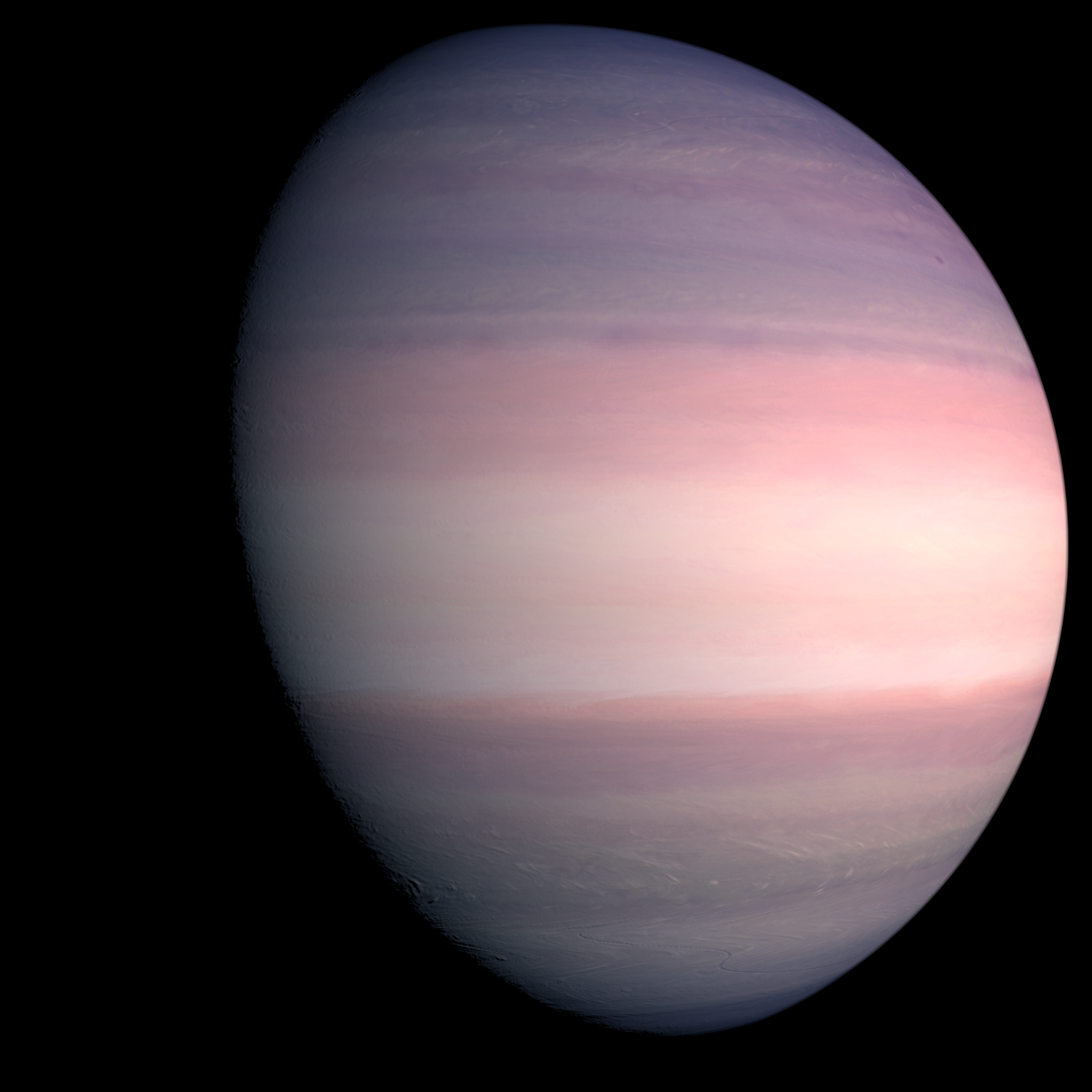
NASA illustration of TOI-1338 b, depicting it as a pastel-hued gas giant. Fans of Sophie have likened this illustration to the cover art of Oil of Every Pearl's Un-Insides.

The planet's name follows the exoplanet naming convention of taking the parent star's name and adding a lowercase letter after it. As it is the first exoplanet discovered orbiting the TOI-1338 star system, it is named TOI-1338 b. The initialism "TOI" stands for "TESS Object of Interest", which is systematically given to the star system when TESS confirms a planet transiting it. Astronomers have also called the planet BEBOP-1 b and EBLM J0608-59 b, after the Binaries Escorted By Orbiting Planets (BEBOP) and Eclipsing Binary, Low Mass (EBLM) surveys that observed the star system, respectively. Wolf Cukier had mentioned in interviews that his brother and family suggested naming the planet Wolftopia, though Cukier admitted that he was content with keeping the planet's original designation.

=== SOPHIE renaming petition ===
In February 2021, Christian Arroyo launched a petition on Change.org calling for NASA to rename TOI-1338 b to SOPHIE, in honor of the late British musician Sophie. The planet was chosen because fans of Sophie pointed out that NASA's depiction of TOI-1338 b resembled the cover art of Sophie's Oil of Every Pearl's Un-Insides album. The petition amassed over 95,000 signatures and was supported by Charli XCX and Caroline Polachek. Although it was unsuccessful in officially renaming the planet, the International Astronomical Union announced in June 2021 that the name Sophiexeon was officially given to the asteroid (10026) 1980 RE_{1}.

== Parent stars and location ==
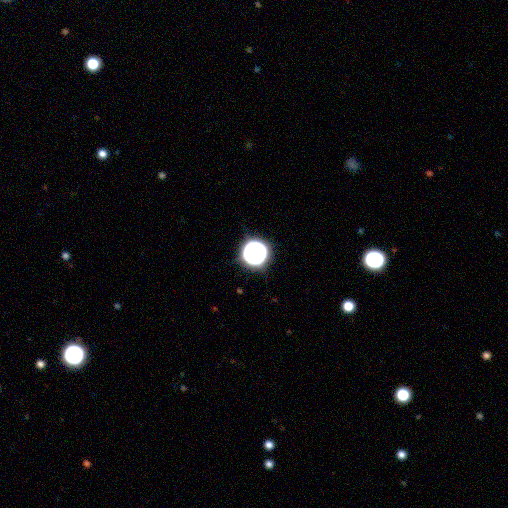
The TOI-1338 star system (center) photographed by SkyMapper in 2014

The parent stars of TOI-1338 b are a binary system consisting of a large, F-type main-sequence star, and a small, red dwarf star. The larger star of the binary system, named A or the primary star, is hotter (temperature 6030 K), brighter (luminosity 2.1 L_{☉}), and larger (radius 1.32 R_{☉}, mass 1.13 M_{☉}) than the Sun. The smaller star of the binary system, named B or the secondary star, is cooler (temperature 3300 K), dimmer (luminosity 0.009 L_{☉}), and smaller (radius 0.31 R_{☉}, mass 0.31 M_{☉}) than the Sun. The two stars, collectively known as TOI-1338 (or BEBOP-1 or EBLM J0608-59), orbit each other every 14.6 days and are mutually separated by an average distance of about 0.13 astronomical units (20 million km or 12 million mi).

The TOI-1338 system is known to host two circumbinary planets, which are named TOI-1338 b and TOI-1338 c. Together, TOI-1338 and its planetary system are located in the southern constellation of Pictor, at a distance of about 1,300 light-years (400 parsecs) from Earth. Viewed from Earth, TOI-1338 appears at an apparent magnitude of 11.7, which is too faint to be seen with the naked eye or a small telescope.

== Planetary properties ==
=== Orbit ===
TOI-1338 b is a circumbinary planet, meaning it orbits around two stars. For this reason, it is popularly compared to the fictional circumbinary planet Tatooine from Star Wars. TOI-1338 b is the innermost planet of the TOI-1338 system, orbiting 0.46 astronomical units (AU; 69 million km or 43 million mi) from the stars' center of mass with an orbital period of about 95 days. It follows a nearly circular orbit that is nearly coplanar to its parent stars. Specifically, it has an orbital eccentricity of about 0.03 and an inclination of about 0.1° with respect to the plane of its parent stars' binary orbit. In its nearly coplanar orbit, TOI-1338 b experiences regular eclipses by its parent stars as they revolve around each other.

Due to the orbital motion of the two stars, they periodically tug on TOI-1338 b and perturb its circumbinary orbit, causing it to precess over a few decades. Calculations from 2020 show that TOI-1338 b's orbit exhibits apsidal precession with a period of roughly 23 years and nodal precession with a period of 21.4 years. The planet also exerts a gravitational influence on its parent stars, causing their binary orbit to apsidally precess at a rate of 14.56 arcseconds per year (corresponding to a period of 89,000 years). (Note: The precession rate of 14.56 arcseconds per year can be converted into precession period by dividing 14.56 by 3600 (the number of arcseconds in 1 degree) and then dividing 360 degrees (1 revolution) by that result: Convert arcseconds to degrees: $14.56 \frac{\text{arcsec}}{\text{year}} \cdot \frac{1 \text{ deg}}{3600 \text{ arcsec}} \approx 4.044\times10^{-3} \frac{\text{deg}}{\text{year}}$ Convert rate to period: $\frac{360 \text{ deg}}{1 \text{ rev}} \cdot \frac{\text{year}}{4.044\times10^{-3} \text{ deg}} \approx 89,010 \frac{\text{year}}{\text{rev}}$) Despite being perturbed by its parent stars, simulations have shown that the orbit of TOI-1338 b is stable for at least 10 million years, thanks to the fact that TOI-1338 b and its neighboring planet TOI-1338 c have nearly circular and coplanar orbits, and that TOI-1338 b orbits far enough from its parent stars (beyond the dynamical instability zone within 0.36 AU from their center of mass).

==== Transits ====
In the sky, the orbits of both TOI-1338 b and its parent stars are aligned to Earth's line of sight (inclination nearly 90°) such that they appear to eclipse and transit. The nearly coplanar orbit of TOI-1338 b ensures that it always transits its larger parent star from Earth's point of view, despite precessing. (Note: Initial predictions from 2020 suggested that TOI-1338 b's orbital precession would cause the planet to stop transiting its parent stars after November 2023, but this has since been refuted in a 2024 study.) On the other hand, the planet's orbital inclination is large enough that it rarely transits the smaller parent star over the course of its precession period. Due to the orbital motion of the parent stars, the planet's transits are irregular, occurring between every 93 and 95 days and lasting between 6 and 13 hours. When TOI-1338 b transits its larger parent star, it can block out up to 0.3% of the system's overall brightness. (Note: Transits of the larger star by TOI-1338 b reduce the star system's normalized flux (brightness) from 1 to 0.997, as shown in Figure 2 of Wang et al. (2024). The difference between these fluxes is the amount of the star system's original brightness blocked by the planet: 1 – 0.997 = 0.003, or 0.3%. Kostov et al. (2020) also mention that TOI-1338 b's transit of the larger star blocks out roughly 0.2% of the star system's overall brightness.) On the other hand, TOI-1338 b's transits of the smaller parent star are too faint to be detected by TESS.

Two views of the TOI-1338 system. Left: Edge-on view as seen from Earth, with TOI-1338 b depicted transiting the larger star. Right: Top view, with planets, instability zone, and habitable zone (HZ) labeled.

Simulated timelapse of the TOI-1338 system as seen from Earth's perspective, showing how the orbit angle of TOI-1338 b slowly changes over time due to nodal orbital precession.

=== Physical properties ===
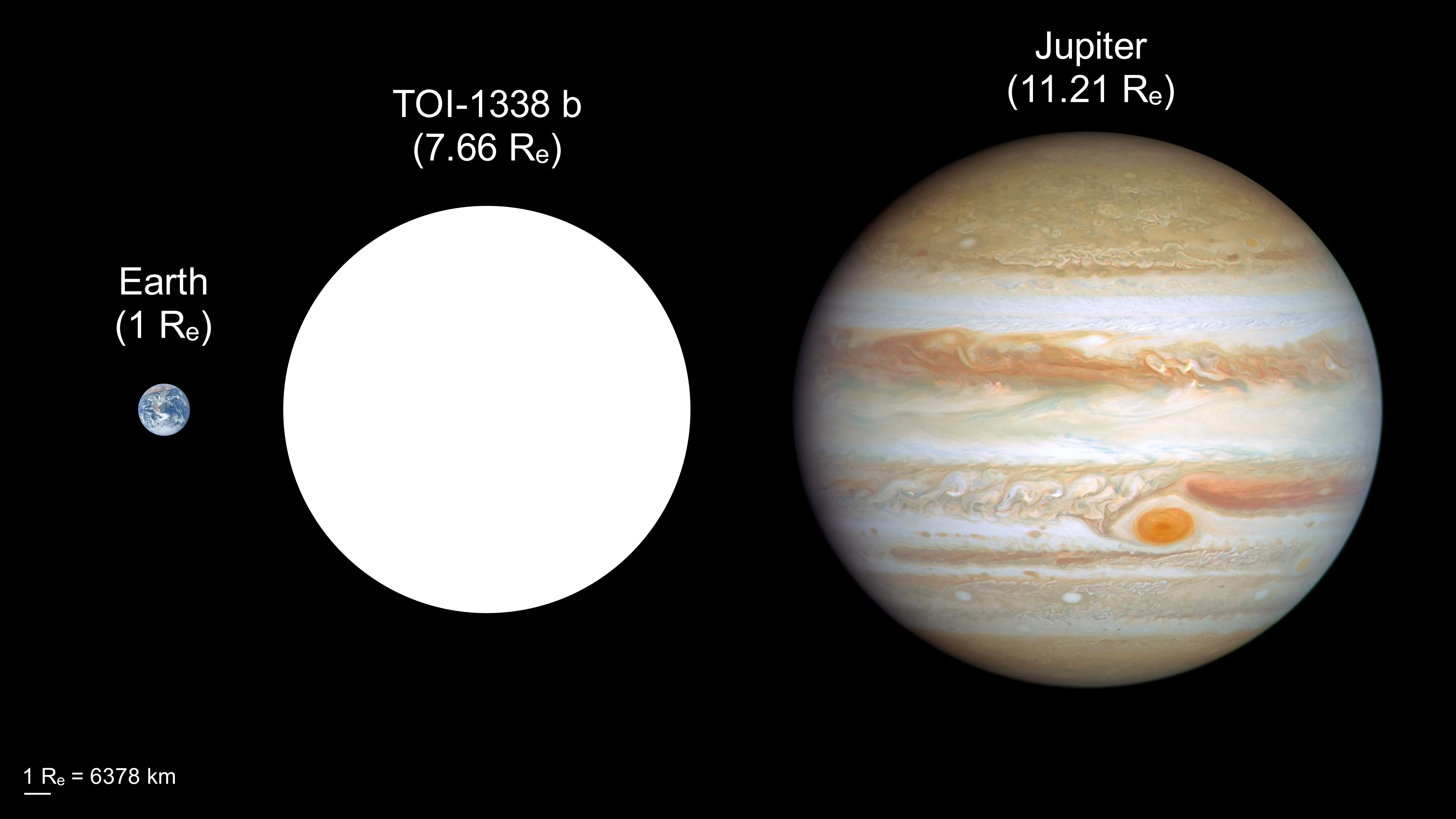
Size comparison of TOI-1338 b (center) with Earth and Jupiter

The physical appearance of TOI-1338 b is unknown, as it is too far away from Earth to be visited or imaged in detail. In spite of this, the planet's physical properties can be inferred from its transits and gravitational influence on its parent stars. As of 2024, the radius of TOI-1338 b is estimated to be 7.661±0.053 times that of Earth's, which makes it most likely a gas giant similar to Saturn in size (81% Saturn's equatorial radius (Note: Saturn has an equatorial radius of 60268 km, or 9.449 times Earth's equatorial radius.)). Radial velocity measurements from 2024 show that TOI-1338 b is 11.3±2.1 times as massive as Earth, or about 78%±14% the mass of Uranus, the Solar System's least massive giant planet. (Note: Uranus has a mass of 8.681×10^{25} kg, or 14.54 Earth masses.)

The large radius but small mass of TOI-1338 b indicates it has an extremely low bulk density of 0.137±0.026 g/cm^{3}, which is far less dense than Saturn (0.69 g/cm^{3}), the least dense planet in the Solar System. The low density of TOI-1338 b makes it a super-puff, a type of exoplanet thought to have a small core surrounded by a substantial envelope of gas. Super-puffs have been previously observed in circumbinary planetary systems, such as Kepler-47. Like other super-puffs, the gas envelope of TOI-1338 b is estimated to constitute more than 50% of the planet's entire mass.

As the nearest planet to its parent stars, TOI-1338 b is heated to an average equilibrium temperature of 630 K (357 °C; 674 °F). The orbital motion of the two stars causes the planet's equilibrium temperature to vary between 603 and 659 K (330 and 386 °C; 626 and 727 °F). According to Wolf Cukier, TOI-1338 b is too hot to likely support extraterrestrial life.

The composition of TOI-1338 b is unknown, as it has not yet been studied via transmission spectroscopy. Astronomers have speculated that super-puffs like TOI-1338 b might have either a hazy atmosphere or a ring system. The James Webb Space Telescope, which is capable of determining the atmospheric composition of TOI-1338 b, is scheduled to make its first spectroscopic observations of TOI-1338 b's transits on 24 and 25 September 2026 (Universal Time). If successful, these observations will provide the first characterization of a circumbinary exoplanet's atmosphere.

== Origin ==
Studies as of 2024 estimate that the TOI-1338 system is 6.0±0.3 billion years old, which is older than the Solar System. The coplanar orbits of planets and stars in the TOI-1338 system suggests that it formed from a single, flat protoplanetary disk. Simulations by Gavin Coleman and collaborators in 2023 showed that circumbinary systems resembling TOI-1338 can form within 10 million years if the protoplanetary disk had low levels of turbulence (or viscosity) and ultraviolet irradiation. These conditions limit the loss of protoplanetary material over time, which would allow the circumbinary planets to have more time and material to grow into gas giants.

TOI-1338 b likely did not form at its current location, as simulations have shown that circumbinary planets migrate closer to their parent stars via interactions with protoplanetary disk. Simulations have also shown that circumbinary planets stop migrating inward when they reach close to the dynamical instability zone around their parent stars, where a central cavity in the protoplanetary disk is carved out by the stars and planets trapped in that region. Indeed, various circumbinary exoplanets including TOI-1338 b have been observed to orbit close to their stars' dynamical instability zone, which supports these simulations. The low density and presumably gas-dominated composition of TOI-1338 b further support the hypothesis that it originally formed farther away from its parent stars, where the protoplanetary disk temperature and opacity was low enough for gases to begin accreting.

== See also ==
- TOI-1338 c – second and outermost known planet in the TOI-1338 system
- Kepler-16b – the first circumbinary exoplanet discovered
- Kepler-47 – eclipsing binary star system with three low-density circumbinary planets like TOI-1338 b
- List of exoplanets discovered in 2020
