= TOI-1338 c =

Circumbinary exoplanet orbiting TOI-1338

Discovery
- Discovered by: Matthew Standing et al. (BEBOP)
- Discovery date: 2023
- Detection method: Radial velocity

Designations
- Alternative names: BEBOP-1 c (Note: In the NASA Exoplanet Archive and the 2023 discovery paper by Matthew Standing et al., the names "TOI-1338 b" and "BEBOP-1 c" are written with a space between their prefixes and lowercase letter "c". While some news articles and scientific papers write the name as "BEBOP-1c" without the space, this Wikipedia article follows the format used by the NASA Exoplanet Archive.)

Orbital characteristics
- Epoch BJD 2458300.0 (30 June 2018 12:00 UT) (Note: The reference epoch of BJD 2458300.0 corresponds to the Universal Time (UT) date of 30 June 2018 12:00 UT, which is approximately 90 days before the first observed transit by TOI-1338 b in TESS Sector 3.)
- Semi-major axis: 0.794±0.016 AU
- Eccentricity: 0.037+0.032 −0.026
- Orbital period (sidereal): 215.79±0.46 d
- Inclination: 97.00°+6.70° −6.80° (wrt sky); 9.1°+4.8° −6.0° (wrt binary orbit)
- Argument of perihelion: 344.64°+25.87° −31.25°
- Semi-amplitude: 5.6±1.0 m/s
- Star: TOI-1338

Physical characteristics
- Mass: 75.4+4.0 −3.6 M_{🜨} (0.237+0.013 −0.011 M_{J})

TOI-1338 c (also known as BEBOP-1 c) is a gas giant exoplanet orbiting the binary star system TOI-1338. The planet and its two stars are located in the constellation Pictor, about 1,300 light-years (400 parsecs) from Earth. It is the outermost known planet of the TOI-1338 planetary system, orbiting the stars' center of mass every 216 days at an average distance of 0.79 astronomical units (AU; 119 million km or 74 million mi). The discovery of TOI-1338 c was announced in 2023, after it was detected in radial velocity measurements of its parent stars by the Binaries Escorted By Orbiting Planets (BEBOP) project during 2009–2022.

The planet is estimated to be 75.4+4.0
−3.6 times more massive than Earth, although it has an unknown radius.

== Discovery ==
TOI-1338 c was discovered in spectroscopic observations of the binary star system TOI-1338, taken by the La Silla and Paranal observatories in Chile for the Binaries Escorted By Orbiting Planets (BEBOP) project during 2009 to 2022. The BEBOP project was an astronomical survey intended to detect circumbinary exoplanets orbiting eclipsing binary stars using the radial velocity method, which involves detecting the exoplanet's gravitational influence on its parent stars via Doppler spectroscopy. The exoplanet's gravitational pull causes the parent stars to wobble with respect to Earth's line of sight, resulting in the stars appearing redshifted or blueshifted as they move away and toward Earth, respectively.

The first sign of TOI-1338 c was reported in 2021 by a team led by Matthew Standing, who noticed a periodic 200-day radial velocity variation in the TOI-1338 star system. The detection of this planet was confirmed after further observations took place in 2021 to 2022. The discovery of TOI-1338 c was announced by Standing's team and published in the journal Nature Astronomy on 12 June 2023. TOI-1338 c was the first circumbinary exoplanet discovered using the radial velocity method, and the TOI-1338 system was the second binary star discovered to host multiple circumbinary planets.

== Name ==
The planet's name follows the exoplanet naming convention of taking the parent star's name and adding a lowercase letter after it. As it is the second exoplanet discovered orbiting the TOI-1338 star system, it is named TOI-1338 c. The initialism "TOI" stands for "TESS Object of Interest", which is systematically given to the star system when TESS confirms a planet transiting it. The TOI-1338 system is also known as BEBOP-1 because it was observed by the BEBOP project, so TOI-1338 c borrows the name BEBOP-1 c. Since TOI-1338 c was discovered by the BEBOP project and was not observed by the Transiting Exoplanet Survey Satellite (TESS), Matthew Standing's team prefer the name BEBOP-1 c for the planet.

== Parent stars and location ==
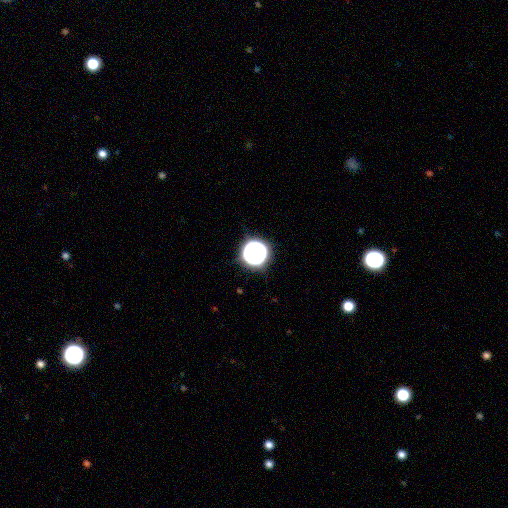
The TOI-1338 star system (center) photographed by SkyMapper in 2014

The parent stars of TOI-1338 b are a binary system consisting of a large, F-type main-sequence star, and a small, red dwarf star. The larger star of the binary system, named A or the primary star, is hotter (temperature 6030 K), brighter (luminosity 2.1 L_{☉}), and larger (radius 1.32 R_{☉}, mass 1.13 M_{☉}) than the Sun. The smaller star of the binary system, named B or the secondary star, is cooler (temperature 3300 K), dimmer (luminosity 0.009 L_{☉}), and smaller (radius 0.31 R_{☉}, mass 0.31 M_{☉}) than the Sun. The two stars, collectively known as TOI-1338 (or BEBOP-1 or EBLM J0608-59), orbit each other every 14.6 days and are mutually separated by an average distance of about 0.13 astronomical units (20 million km or 12 million mi).

The TOI-1338 system is known to host two circumbinary planets, which are named TOI-1338 b and TOI-1338 c. Together, TOI-1338 and its planetary system are located in the southern constellation of Pictor, at a distance of about 1,300 light-years (400 parsecs) from Earth. Viewed from Earth, TOI-1338 appears at an apparent magnitude of 11.7, which is too faint to be seen with the naked eye or a small telescope.

== Planetary properties ==
=== Orbit ===
TOI-1338 c is a circumbinary planet, meaning it orbits around two stars. For this reason, it is popularly compared to the fictional circumbinary planet Tatooine from Star Wars. TOI-1338 c is the outermost known planet of the TOI-1338 system, orbiting 0.79 astronomical units (AU; 119 million km or 74 million mi) from the stars' center of mass with an orbital period of about 216 days. It follows a nearly circular orbit that is somewhat coplanar to its parent stars. Specifically, it has an estimated orbital eccentricity of 0.037+0.032
−0.026 and a low inclination of 9.1°+4.8°
−6.0° with respect to the plane of its parent stars' binary orbit. Unlike its inner neighbor TOI-1338 b, the orbital inclination of TOI-1338 c is large enough that it does not transit its parent stars.

Due to the orbital motion of the two stars, TOI-1338 c experiences periodic perturbations that cause its orbit to precess. A 2023 study by Standing et al. estimated that TOI-1338 c's orbit exhibits nodal precession with a period of roughly 119 years. As it precesses, TOI-1338 c's orbit may eventually align with Earth's line of sight, allowing the planet to begin transiting its parent stars. However, it is uncertain when TOI-1338 c will begin transiting.

Two views of the TOI-1338 system. Left: Edge-on view as seen from Earth, with TOI-1338 b depicted transiting the larger star. Right: Top view, with planets, instability zone, and habitable zone (HZ) labeled

=== Physical properties ===
Radial velocity measurements as of 2024 indicate TOI-1338 c has a mass 75.4+4.0
−3.6 times that of Earth's, or about 79%±4% of Saturn's mass. (Note: Saturn has a mass of 5.683×10^{26} kg, or 95.16 Earth masses.) Based on its mass, TOI-1338 c is presumed to be a gas giant planet. However, the planet's radius is unknown, because it has not been observed to transit its parent stars.

== Origin ==
Studies as of 2024 estimate that the TOI-1338 system is 6.0±0.3 billion years old, which is older than the Solar System. The coplanar orbits of planets and stars in the TOI-1338 system suggests that it formed from a single, flat protoplanetary disk. Simulations by Gavin Coleman and collaborators in 2023 showed that circumbinary systems resembling TOI-1338 can form within 10 million years if the protoplanetary disk had low levels of turbulence (or viscosity) and ultraviolet irradiation. These conditions limit the loss of protoplanetary material over time, which would allow the circumbinary planets to have more time and material to grow into gas giants. According to simulations, the planets of the TOI-1338 system likely originally formed farther away from their parent stars, but migrated inward to their present-day locations.

== See also ==
- Kepler-16b – the first circumbinary exoplanet discovered
- Kepler-47 – eclipsing binary star system with three low-density circumbinary planets
- List of exoplanets discovered in 2023
