= Kepler-47 =

Binary star in the constellation Cygnus

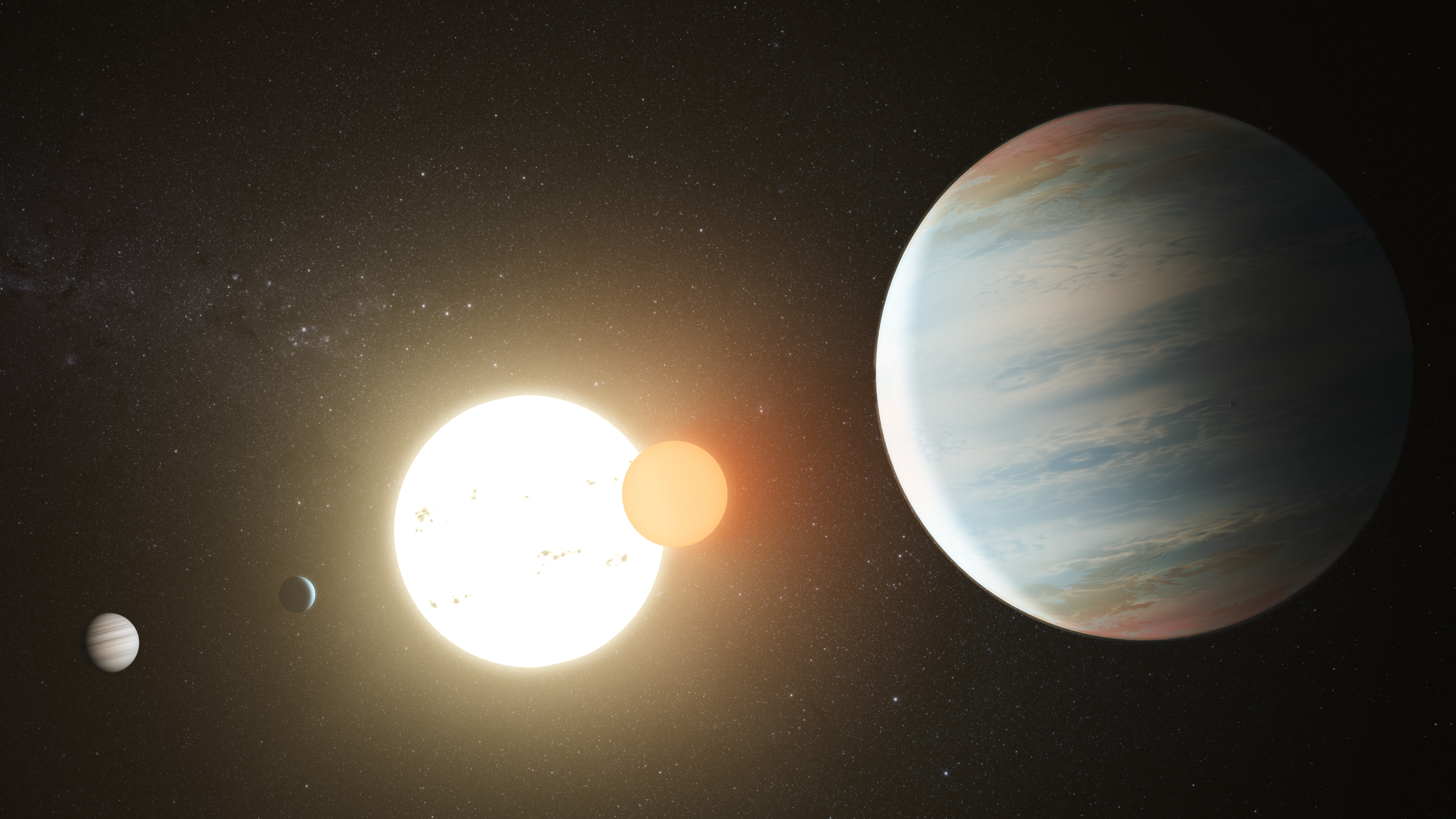
- Artistic representation of Kepler-47 System

Observation data Epoch J2000 Equinox ICRS
- Constellation: Cygnus
- Right ascension: 19^{h} 41^{m} 11.49832^{s}
- Declination: +46° 55′ 13.7073″
- Apparent magnitude (V): 15.4

Characteristics
- Evolutionary stage: Main sequence
- Spectral type: G6V + M4V

Astrometry
Proper motion (μ)	RA: −3.383 mas/yr Dec.: −10.212 mas/yr
Parallax (π)	0.9540±0.0208 mas
Distance	3,420 ± 70 ly (1,050 ± 20 pc)

Orbit
Primary	Kepler-47A
Name	Kepler-47B
Period (P)	7.4483648+0.0000038 −0.0000270 d
Semi-major axis (a)	0.08145+0.00036 −0.00037 AU
Eccentricity (e)	0.0288+0.0015 −0.0013
Inclination (i)	89.613+0.045 −0.040°
Argument of periastron (ω) (secondary)	226.3+2.8 −2.6°

Details

Kepler-47A
Mass	0.957+0.013 −0.015 M_{☉}
Radius	0.936±0.005 R_{☉}
Luminosity	0.840 ± 0.067 L_{☉}
Surface gravity (log g)	4.488 ± 0.01 cgs
Temperature	5636 ± 100 K
Metallicity [Fe/H]	−0.25 ± 0.08 dex
Rotational velocity (v sin i)	4.1+0.5 −0.35 km/s
Age	4–5 Gyr

Kepler-47B
Mass	0.342±0.003 M_{☉}
Radius	0.338±0.002 R_{☉}
Luminosity	0.014 ± 0.002 L_{☉}
Surface gravity (log g)	4.9073 ± 0.0067 cgs
Temperature	3357 ± 100 K
Age	4–5 Gyr

Other designations
- 2MASS J19411149+4655136, KOI-3154, KIC 10020423

Database references
SIMBAD	data
Exoplanet Archive	data
KIC	data

Kepler-47 is a binary star system in the constellation Cygnus located about 3,420 light-years (1,050 parsecs) away from Earth. The stars have three exoplanets, all of which orbit both stars at the same time, making this a circumbinary system. The first two planets announced are designated Kepler-47b and Kepler-47c, and the third, later discovery is Kepler-47d. Kepler-47 is the first circumbinary multi-planet system discovered by the Kepler mission. The outermost of the planets is a gas giant orbiting within the habitable zone of the stars. Because most larger stars (the size of the sun or greater) are binary, the discovery that multi-planet systems can form in such a system has impacted previous theories of planetary formation.

A group of astronomers led by Jerome Orosz at San Diego State University, including astronomers from Tel-Aviv University in Israel, discovered the planetary system via NASA's Kepler space telescope in 2012. In November 2013, evidence of a third planet orbiting between the planets b and c, Kepler-47d, was announced. Later analyses of transit data from the Kepler space telescope confirmed the existence of Kepler-47d.

== Nomenclature and history ==
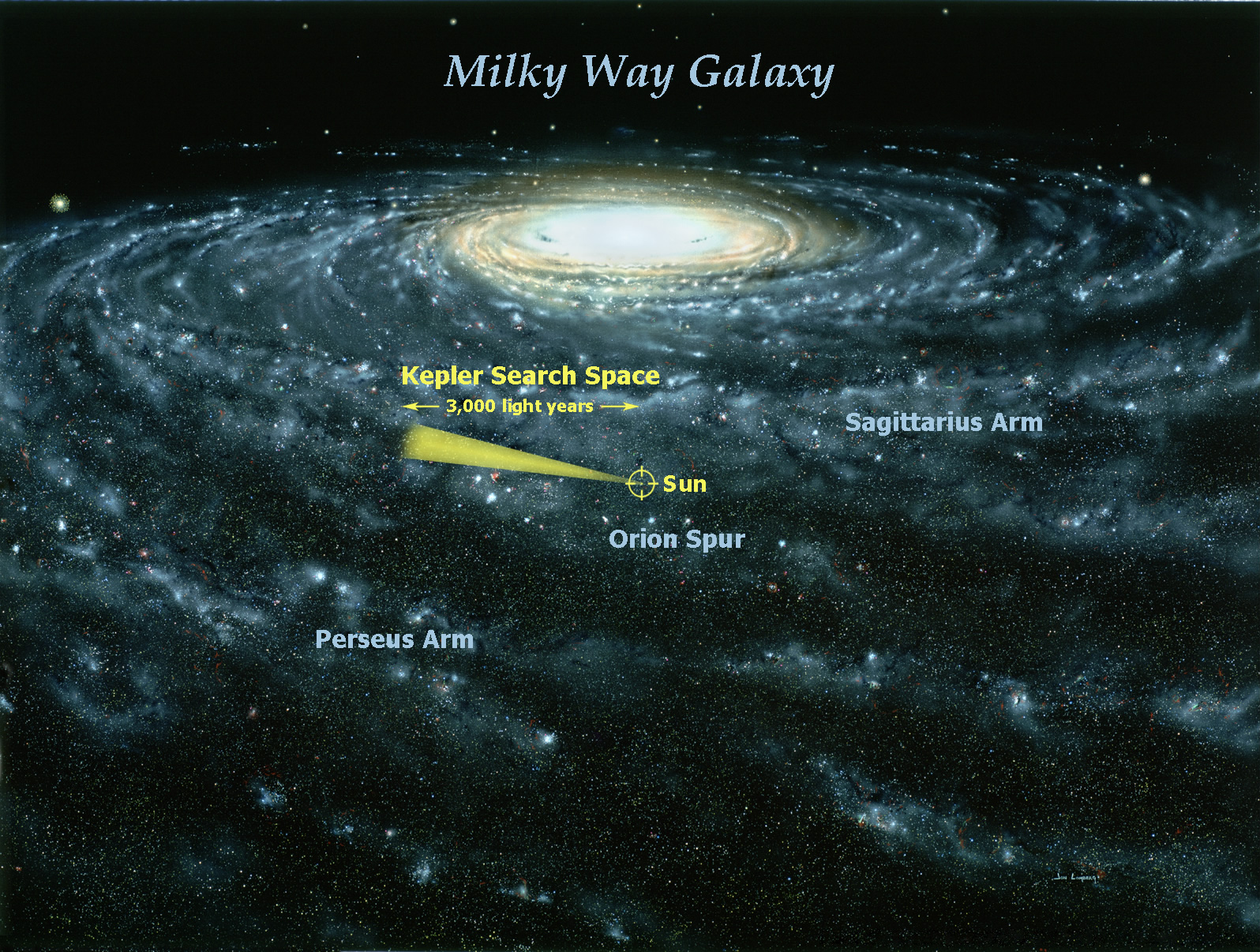
The Kepler Space Telescope search volume, in the context of the Milky Way Galaxy.

Prior to Kepler observation, Kepler-47 had the 2MASS catalogue number 2MASS J19411149+4655136. In the Kepler Input Catalog it has the designation of KIC 10020423, and when it was found to have transiting planet candidates it was given the Kepler object of interest number of KOI-3154.

Planetary candidates were detected around the pair of stars by NASA's Kepler Mission, a mission tasked with discovering planets in transit around their stars. The discoverers referred the pair of stars as Kepler-47, which is the normal procedure for naming stars with exoplanets discovered by the spacecraft. Hence, this is the name used by the public to refer to the pair of stars and its planets. Candidate planets that are associated with stars studied by the Kepler Mission are known as Kepler objects of interest (KOI) and are assigned the designations ".01", ".02", ".03" etc. after the star's name, in the order of discovery. If planet candidates are detected simultaneously, then the ordering follows the order of orbital periods from shortest to longest. Following these rules, two candidate planets were detected, with orbital periods of 49.51 and 303.158 days. Upon confirmation, the planets of Kepler-47 are designated by letters, with the first planet being designated b and so on. The ordering of designations are identical to the latter designations for candidate planets.

== Stellar characteristics ==
Kepler-47 is a binary star system located about 1,055 parsecs (3,440 light-years) away from Earth. The binary system is composed of a G-type main sequence star (Kepler-47A) and a red dwarf star (Kepler-47B). The stars orbit each other around their barycenter, or center of mass between them, completing one full orbit every 7.45 days. The stars orbit their barycenter from a distance of about 0.084 AU. The stars have 104% and 35% of the Sun's mass, and 96% and 35% of the Sun's radius, respectively. They have surface temperatures of 5636 K and 3357 K. Based on the stellar characteristics and orbital dynamics, an estimated age of 4–5 billion years for the system is possible. In comparison, the Sun is about 4.6 billion years old, and has a temperature of 5772 K.

The primary star is somewhat metal-poor, with a metallicity ([Fe/H]) of about −0.25, or about 56% of the amount of iron and other heavier metals found in the Sun. Both of the stars' luminosities are typical for their kind, with a luminosities of around 84% and 1% of that of the solar luminosity, respectively.

The apparent magnitude of the star system, or how bright it appears from Earth's perspective, is about 15.4. It is too dim to be seen with the naked eye, which can typically detect objects with a magnitude less than 6.5.

== Planetary system ==
Prior to the discovery of the Kepler-47 planetary system by Jerome Orosz, his colleagues, as well as astronomers from Tel-Aviv University in 2012, most scientists thought that binary stars with multiple planets could not exist. It was believed that gravitational perturbations caused by the orbiting parent stars would cause any circumbinary planets to collide with each other or be ejected out of orbit, either into one of the parent stars or away from the system. However, this discovery demonstrates that multiple planets can form around binary stars, even in their habitable zones; and while the planets in the Kepler-47 system are unlikely to harbor life, other planets orbiting around binary star systems may be habitable and could support life. Because most stars are binary, the discovery that multi-planet systems can form in such a system has impacted previous theories of planetary formation, and could provide more opportunities for finding potentially habitable exoplanets.

The binary system is known to host three planets, all orbiting close to each other and larger than Earth, with no solid surface. All three of the planets in the Kepler-47 system have a very low density, less than that of Saturn. The densities of the planets are estimated to be around 0.26 g/cm^{3} to 0.68 g/cm^{3}. The low densities of the planets are unusual for their relatively mild temperatures; planets with such low densities are typically hot jupiters that orbit close to their host stars, being known as so-called puffy planets. Temperate low-density planets like these are thought to be uncommon.

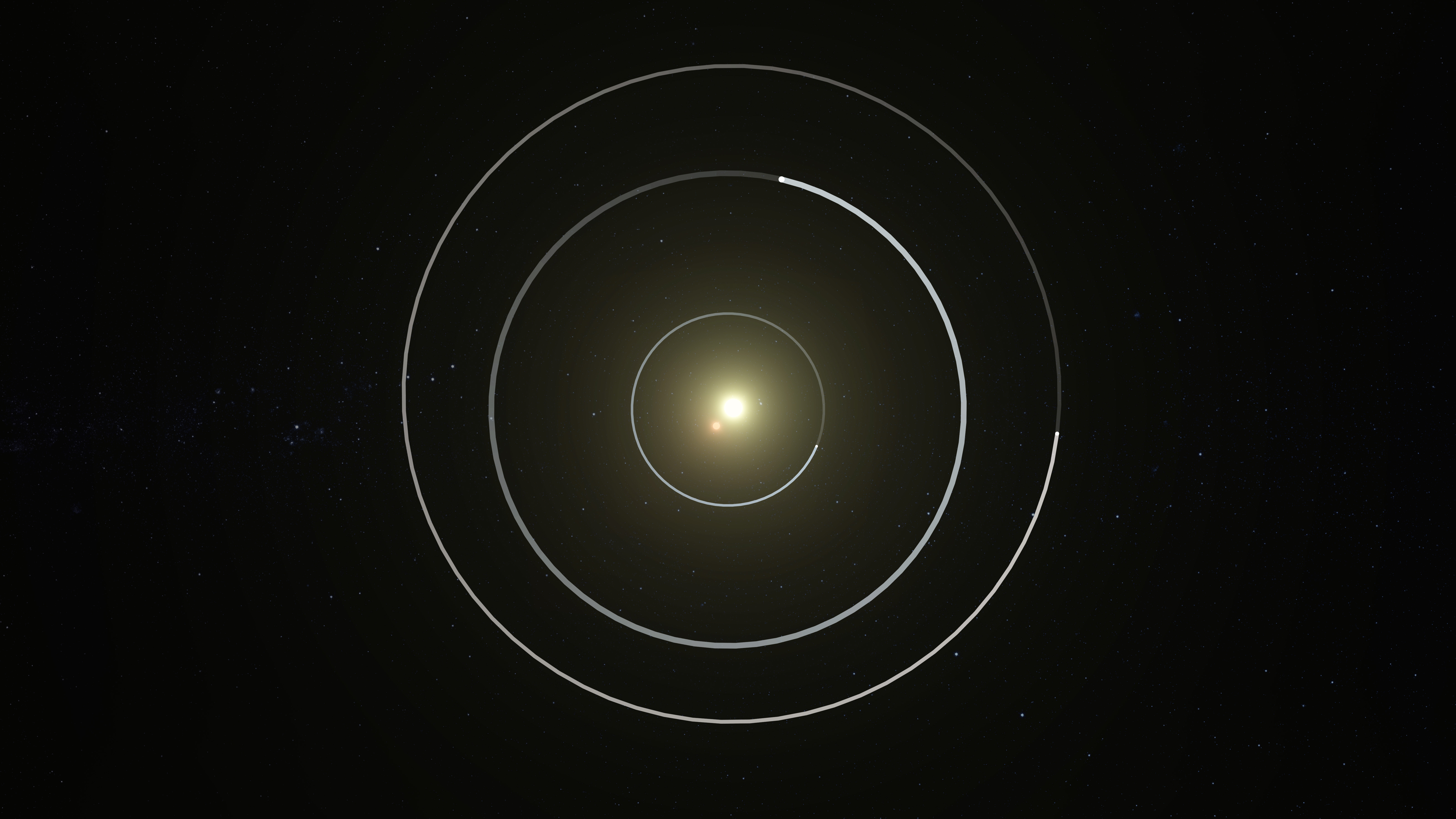
Orbital diagram of the Kepler-47 system. The outermost planet is Kepler-47c while the innermost planet is Kepler-47b. The largest planet, Kepler-47d, orbits between Kepler-47 b and c.

The Kepler-47 planetary system
Companion (in order from star)	Mass	Semimajor axis (AU)	Orbital period (days)	Eccentricity	Inclination (°)	Radius
b	2.07+23.70 −2.07 M_{🜨}	0.2877+0.0014 −0.0011	49.4643+0.0081 −0.0074	0.0210+0.0025 −0.0022	89.752+0.063 −0.045	3.05±0.04 R_{🜨}
d	19.02+23.84 −11.67 M_{🜨}	0.6992+0.0031 −0.0033	187.366+0.069 −0.051	0.024+0.025 −0.017	90.395+0.009 −0.012	7.04+0.66 −0.49 R_{🜨}
c	3.17+2.18 −1.25 M_{🜨}	0.9638+0.0041 −0.0044	303.227+0.062 −0.027	0.044+0.029 −0.019	90.1925+0.0055 −0.0042	4.65+0.09 −0.07 R_{🜨}

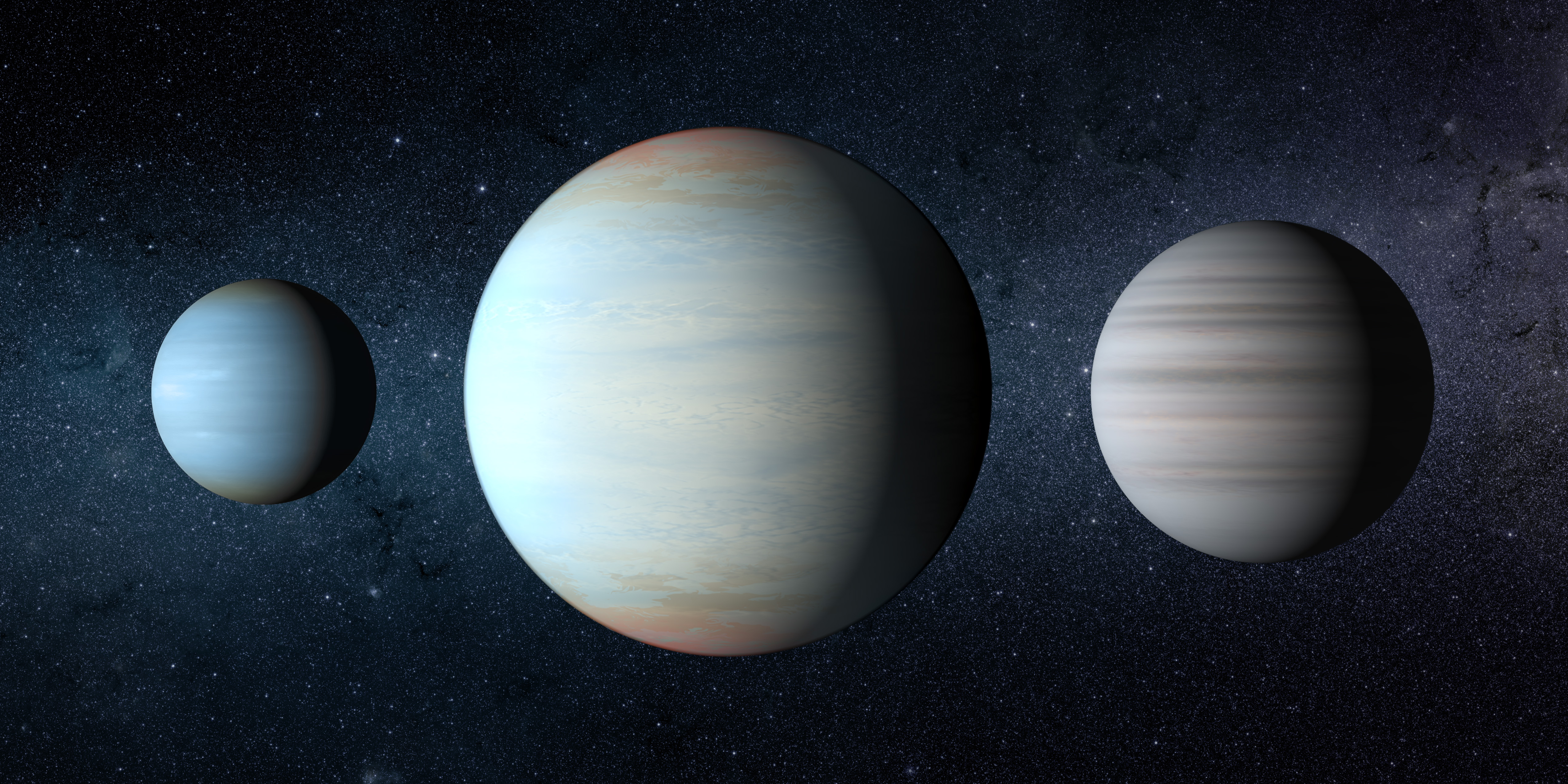
Artist's depiction of the relative sizes of the three planets in the Kepler-47 system. From the left: Kepler-47b; Kepler-47d; and Kepler-47c.

=== Kepler-47b ===
Kepler-47b is a Neptune class planet and the innermost planet of the Kepler-47 system. It resides close to its parent stars, at a distance of 0.2956 AU. It completes one full orbit around its parent stars in less than 50 days. The equilibrium temperature of Kepler-47b is 442 K, therefore being inhospitable to life. Due to the high equilibrium temperature of Kepler-47b, methane gas in its atmosphere would be broken into other compounds, leading to a thick haze that would cover the planet's atmosphere. It is the smallest planet of the Kepler-47 system, being 3.1 times the size of Earth.

=== Kepler-47c ===
The second planet discovered, Kepler-47c, is a Neptune class planet and the outermost planet, orbiting its parent stars from a distance of 0.989 AU, nearly the distance from Earth to the Sun. It completes one full orbit around its parent stars in about 300 days. Kepler-47c is situated within the habitable zone, with an equilibrium temperature of 241 K. The radius of Kepler-47c is 4.7 times that of Earth, comparable in size to Neptune. Although it is assumed Kepler-47c is not capable of harboring life, it could possibly have a dense atmosphere of water vapor and large moons may be habitable.

=== Kepler-47d ===
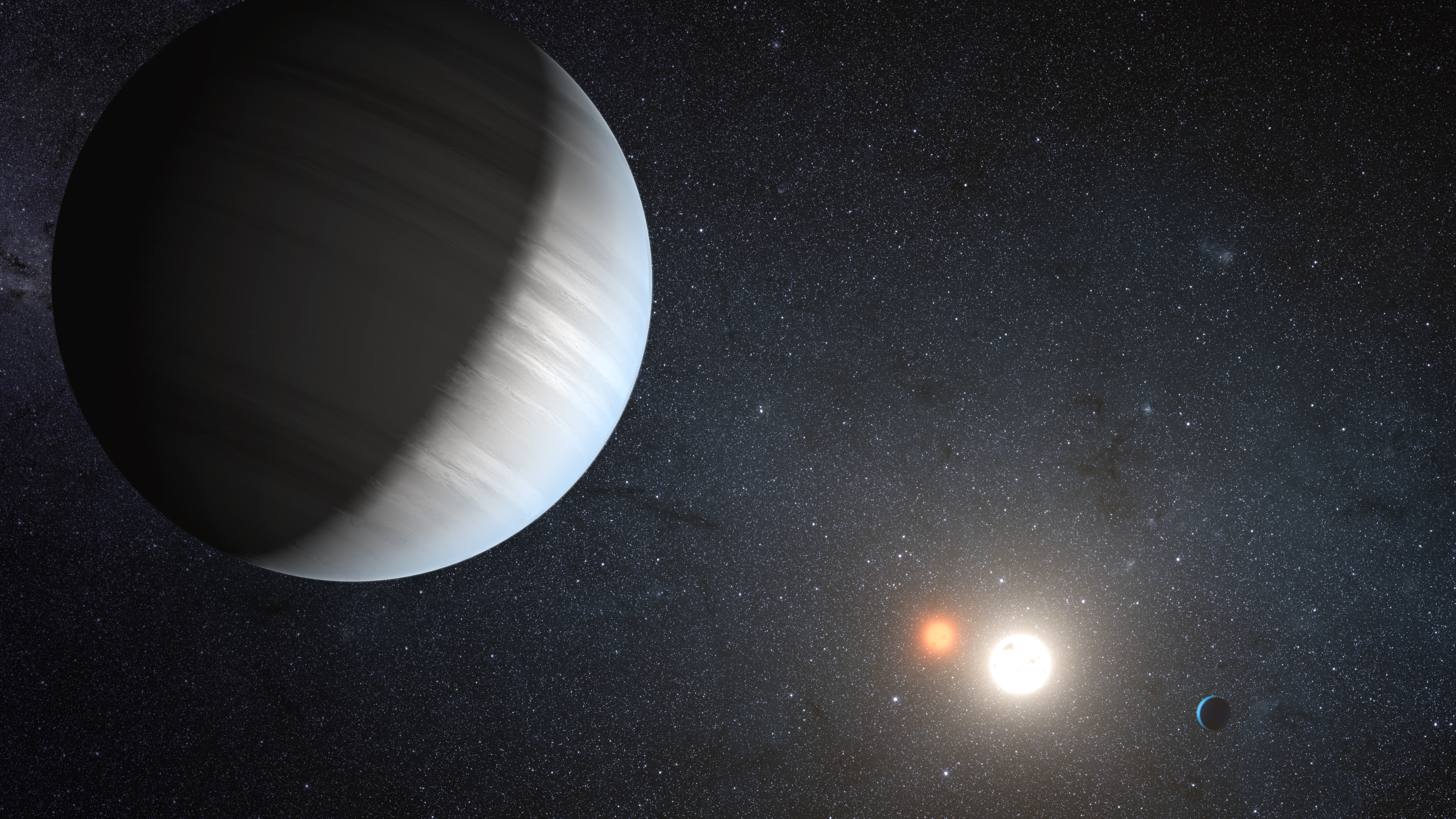
An artist's rendition of Kepler-47d.

The most recently discovered planet in the system, Kepler-47d, was announced as being discovered by astronomer Jerome Orosz and his colleagues at San Diego State University in November 2013. From transit data of the Kepler-47 system from the Kepler space telescope, Orosz's team had noticed one orphan transit signal that lasted for 4.15 hours, and was not attributed to the two previously known planets. Due to the weak transit signals of Kepler-47d, it was not detected earlier in 2012. Only one noticeable transit of Kepler-47d has been detected, thus an additional transit of the planet was needed to confirm its existence. From dynamical simulations, the orbit of Kepler-47d was shown to precess over time, resulting in a four-year period without transits from Kepler-47d. Later studies of the Kepler-47 system led to the confirmation of Kepler-47d, which was announced in April 2019. The discovery of Kepler-47d was unexpected for Orosz's team, as they had expected to find additional planets with more distant orbits. Kepler-47d is the largest planet of the Kepler-47 system, with a radius at least 7 times the radius of Earth (almost the size of Saturn, though its mass is comparable to that of Neptune). It orbits between the planets Kepler-47b and c at a distance of about 0.7 AU, completing an orbit every 187.35 days. Its equilibrium temperature is around 283 K.

== See also ==
- TOI-1338, the second binary star system with multiple discovered circumbinary exoplanets
- NN Serpentis, an eclipsing binary system hosting two disputed exoplanets
- Lists of exoplanets
- List of extrasolar planet firsts, including Kepler-47 with the most circumbinary planets
