= Kepler-47c =

Temperate gas giant in Kepler-47 system

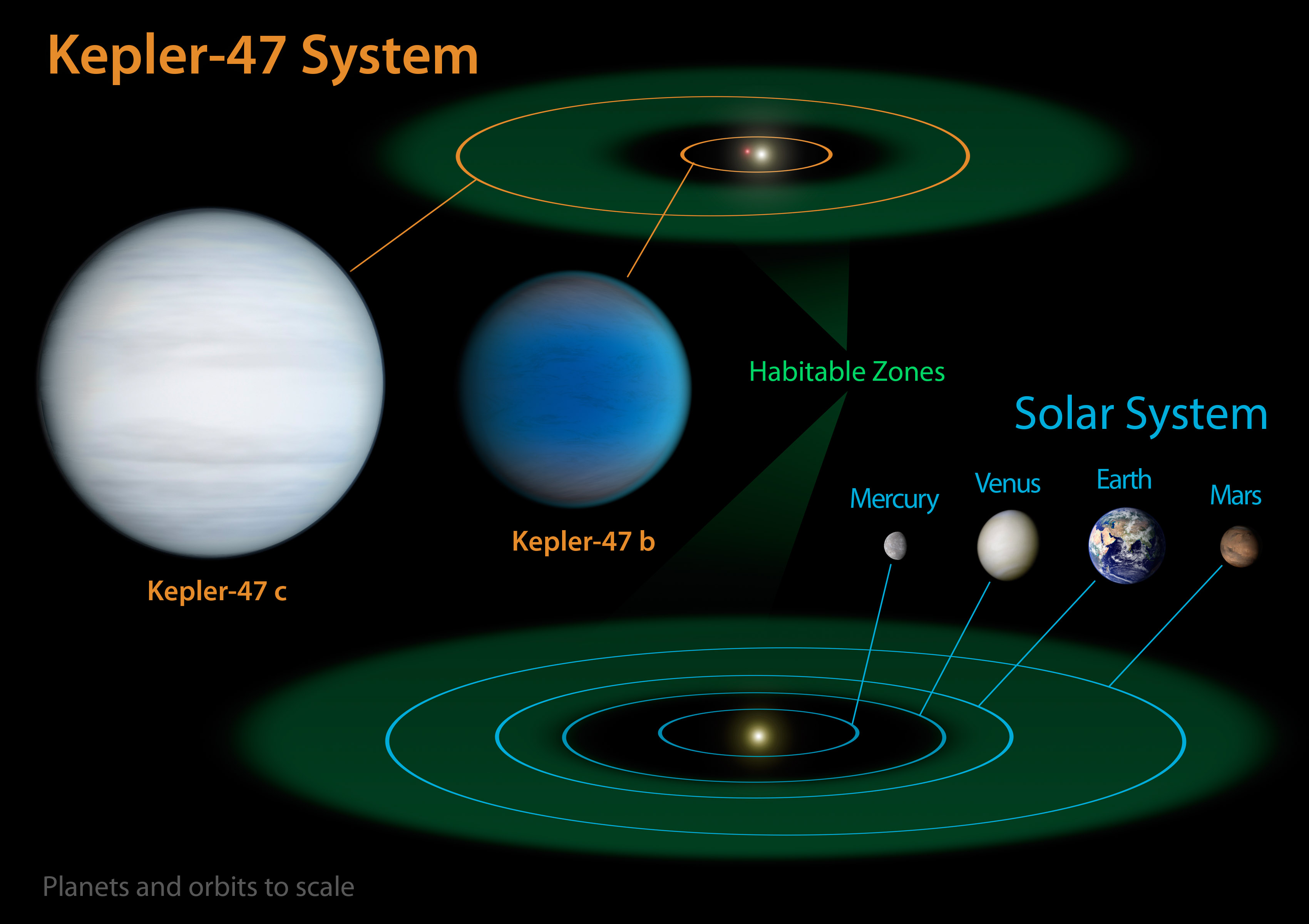
- Artist's impression of the Kepler-47 system (sizes to scale) compared to the planets of the inner Solar System with their respective habitable zones.

Discovery
- Discovered by: Kepler spacecraft
- Discovery date: August 3, 2012
- Detection method: Transit (Kepler Mission)

Orbital characteristics
- Semi-major axis: 0.9638+0.0041 −0.0044 AU
- Eccentricity: 0.044+0.029 −0.019
- Orbital period (sidereal): 303.227+0.062 −0.027 d
- Inclination: 90.1925°+0.0055° −0.0042°
- Argument of periastron: 306°+40° −67°
- Star: Kepler-47 (KOI-3154)

Physical characteristics
- Mean radius: 4.65+0.09 −0.07 R_{🜨}
- Mass: 3.17+2.18 −1.25 M_{🜨}
- Mean density: 0.17+0.09 −0.07 g/cm^{3}
- Surface gravity: 1.4 m/s^{2} (0.15 g)
- Temperature: 245 K (−28 °C; −19 °F)

Kepler-47c (also known as Kepler-47(AB)-c and by its Kepler Object of Interest designation KOI-3154.02) is an exoplanet orbiting the binary star system Kepler-47, the outermost of three such planets discovered by NASA's Kepler spacecraft. The system, also involving two other exoplanets, is located about 3,400 light-years (1,060 parsecs) away.

== Characteristics ==
=== Mass, radius and temperature ===
Kepler-47c is a gas giant, an exoplanet that is near the same mass and radius as the planets Uranus and Neptune. It has a temperature of 245 K (−28 °C; −19 °F). The planet has a radius of 4.62 R_{🜨} and has no solid surface. It has a mass of around 3.2 M_{🜨}. It orbits within the habitable zone of its system, and could have a dense atmosphere of water vapor.

=== Host stars ===
The planet orbits in a circumbinary orbit around a (G-type) and (M-type) binary star system. The stars orbit each other about every 7.45 days. The stars have masses of 1.04 M_{☉} and 0.35 M_{☉} and radii of 0.96 R_{☉} and 0.35 R_{☉}, respectively. They have temperatures of 5636 K and 3357 K. Based on the stellar characteristics, an estimated age of 4–5 billion years for the system is possible. In comparison, the Sun is about 4.6 billion years old and has a temperature of 5778 K. The primary star is somewhat metal-poor, with a metallicity ([Fe/H]) of −0.25, or 56% of the solar amount. The stars' luminosities (L_{☉}) are 84% and 1% that of the Sun.

The apparent magnitude of the system, or how bright it appears from Earth's perspective, is about 15.8. Therefore, it is too dim to be seen with the naked eye.

=== Orbit ===
Kepler-47c orbits around its parent stars every 303 days at a distance of 0.99 AU from its stars (nearly the same distance that Earth orbits from the Sun, which is about 1 AU). The planet receives about 87.3% of the amount of sunlight that Earth does. Unlike majority of circumbinary planets, Kepler-47c does not seem to have undergone a significant migration since its formation.

== Habitability ==
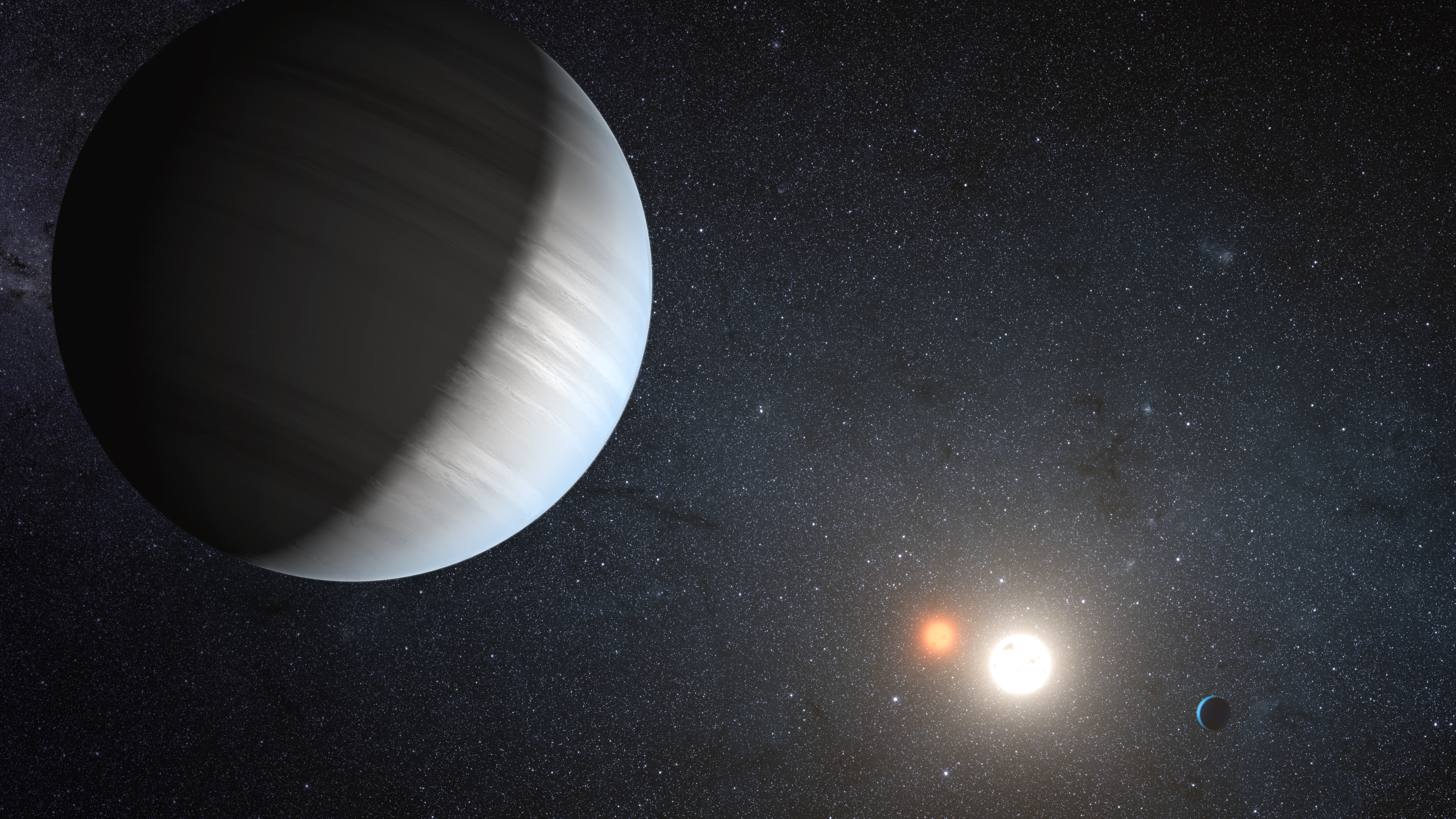
Artist's impression of the Kepler-47 system.

Kepler-47c resides in the circumbinary habitable zone of the parent stars. The exoplanet, with a radius of 4.63 R_{🜨}, is too large to likely be rocky, and because of this the planet itself may not be habitable. Hypothetically, large enough moons, with a sufficient atmosphere and pressure, may be able to support liquid water and potentially life.

For a stable orbit the ratio between the moon's orbital period P_{s} around its primary and that of the primary around its star P_{p} must be < 1/9, e.g. if a planet takes 90 days to orbit its star, the maximum stable orbit for a moon of that planet is less than 10 days. Simulations suggest that a moon with an orbital period less than about 45 to 60 days will remain safely bound to a massive giant planet or brown dwarf that orbits 1 AU from a Sun-like star. In the case of Kepler-47c, this would be practically the same to have a stable orbit.

Tidal effects could also allow the moon to sustain plate tectonics, which would cause volcanic activity to regulate the moon's temperature and create a geodynamo effect which would give the satellite a strong magnetic field.

To support an Earth-like atmosphere for about 4.6 billion years (the age of the Earth), the moon would have to have a Mars-like density and at least a mass of 0.07 M_{🜨}. One way to decrease loss from sputtering is for the moon to have a strong magnetic field that can deflect stellar wind and radiation belts. NASA's Galileo's measurements hints large moons can have magnetic fields; it found that Jupiter's moon Ganymede has its own magnetosphere, even though its mass is only 0.025 M_{🜨}.

The minimum stable star to circumbinary planet separation is about 2-4 times the binary star separation, or orbital period about 3-8 times the binary period. The innermost planets in all the Kepler circumbinary systems (e.g. Kepler-16b, Kepler-451b and such) have been found orbiting close to this radius. The planets have semi-major axes that lie between 1.09 and 1.46 times this critical radius. The reason could be that migration might become inefficient near the critical radius, leaving planets just outside this radius. Kepler-47c lies well outside this critical limit, so its orbit is extremely likely to remain stable for billions of years.

== Discovery ==
Kepler-47c, as well as Kepler-47b, was first discovered by scientists, from both NASA and the Tel-Aviv University in Israel, using the Kepler space telescope. Additionally, the planetary characteristics of both objects were identified by a team of astronomers at the University of Texas at Austin's McDonald observatory. Both planets were discovered after transiting their parent stars, and they both seem to be orbiting along the same plane.

== Significance ==
Before the discovery of Kepler-47c, it was thought that binary stars with multiple planets could not exist. Gravitational issues caused by the parent stars would, it was believed, cause any circumbinary planets to either collide with each other, collide with one of the parent stars, or be flung out of orbit. However, this discovery shows that multiple planets can form around binary stars, even in their habitable zones; and while Kepler-47c is most likely unable to harbor life, it may have habitable moons, and other planets that could support life may orbit binary systems such as Kepler-47.

== See also ==
- List of extrasolar planet firsts
- List of planets discovered by the Kepler spacecraft
