= Backyard Worlds =

NASA-funded citizen science project

Backyard Worlds: Planet 9
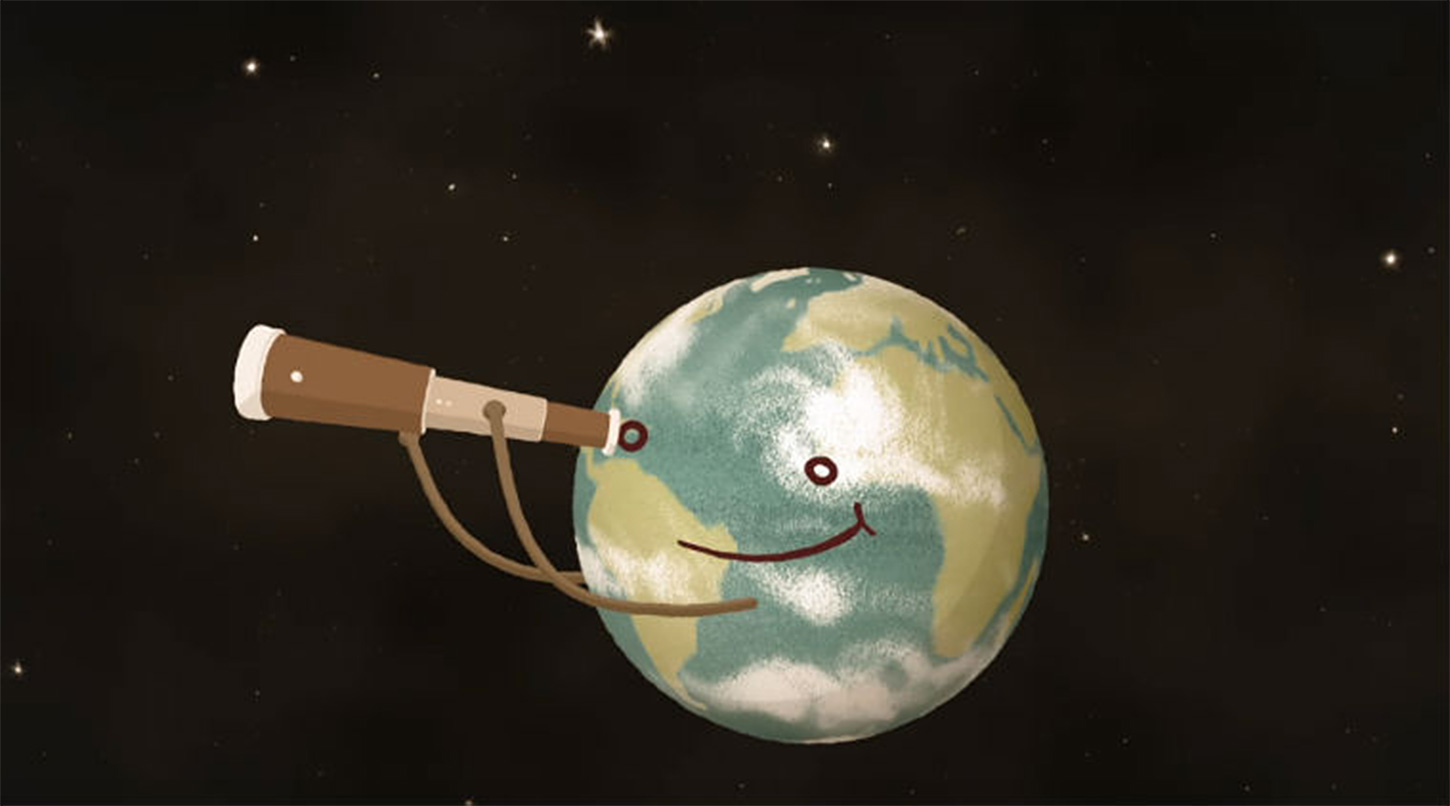
- Logo of Backyard Worlds: Planet 9
- Website type: Citizen science project
- Available in: English
- Website: www.backyardworlds.org
- Commercial: No
- Registration: Optional
- Launched: 15 February 2017; 9 years ago
- Current status: Online

Backyard Worlds: Planet 9 is a NASA-funded citizen science project which is part of the Zooniverse web portal. It aims to discover new brown dwarfs, faint objects that are less massive than stars, some of which might be among the nearest neighbors of the Solar System, and might conceivably detect the hypothesized Planet Nine. The project's principal investigator is Marc Kuchner, an astrophysicist at NASA's Goddard Space Flight Center.

== Origins ==
A typical set of flip book images served up on the Backyard Worlds: Planet 9 website, here displaying the coldest known brown dwarf WISE 0855−0714 as an orange moving spot in the top left-hand corner

Backyard Worlds was launched in February 2017, shortly before the 87th anniversary of the discovery of Pluto, which until its reclassification as a dwarf planet in 2006 was considered the Solar System's ninth major planet. Since that reclassification, evidence has come to light that there may be another planet located in the outer region of the Solar System far beyond the Kuiper belt, most commonly referred to as Planet Nine. This hypothetical new planet would be located so far from the Sun that it would reflect only a very small amount of visible light, rendering it too faint to be detected in most astronomical surveys conducted to date. However, models of the conjectured planet's atmosphere suggest that methane condensation could in some cases make it detectable in infrared images captured by the Wide-field Infrared Survey Explorer (WISE) space telescope. Due to the effects of proper motion and parallax, Planet Nine would appear to move in a distinctive way between images taken of the same patch of sky at different times. In addition to Planet Nine, other objects of interest – such as undiscovered nearby brown dwarfs – would also be seen to move in the project's images.

== Project description ==
Citizen scientists accessing the website search through a flip book-style animation of specially-processed mid-infrared images captured by WISE known as unWISE coadds, taken with filters at the wavelengths of 3.4 and 4.6 micrometers. The coadded unWISE images permits fainter objects to be detected than previous processing of WISE imagery allowed. In the flip books these coadds are differenced, a process designed to remove most of signal from stationary objects, leaving moving objects intact. The aim is to identify points of light that move between the flip book frames, including slower-moving "dipoles". Citizen scientists who spot a moving object are encouraged to fill out a "Think You've Got One" form which the project scientists review to confirm if there is motion. The images contain instrumental artifacts and are noisy, which hampers the use of automated image processing software and makes the task ideal for exploiting human visual recognition capabilities. Additionally, to improve the ability to detect objects some participants have created their own tools such as Wiseview, a web-based animation visualization tool.

Once candidates have been identified the science team follow-up the most scientifically interesting objects using ground-based telescopes (at sites such as Mont Mégantic Observatory, Apache Point Observatory, W. M. Keck Observatory, Las Campanas Observatory, Gemini Observatory and the NASA Infrared Telescope Facility) and space telescopes (principally the Spitzer Space Telescope and the Hubble Space Telescope), in order to clarify their nature and assign a spectral type if possible.

The project has been awarded a grant from NASA's Astrophysics Data Analysis Program which will fund it until 2020.

In November 2018, the project was "rebooted", with new images and reduced noise. By August 2020, more than 100,000 citizen scientists worldwide had taken part in the project.

=== Cool Neighbors project ===
In June 2023 the project "Backyard Worlds: Cool Neighbors" was launched. The "Planet 9" predecessor was focused on finding a hypothesised outer planet, which is not ideal in finding faint brown dwarfs. The new project has switched to focus on searching for faint and cool Y-dwarfs. The new "Cool Neighbors" project pre-selects its images with the help of machine learning.

== Project status ==
In December 2017, seven new brown dwarfs were confirmed, as well as two cool subdwarfs. The spectral types of the new brown dwarfs were T0, T2.8, T5, T6, T6.5, and two of type T8. In addition, there were 337 brown dwarf candidates awaiting spectra for confirmation.

As of the first anniversary of the project in February 2018, the project had discovered 17 brown dwarfs and two cool subdwarfs. The coldest object discovered is of spectral type T9, which raises hopes of discovering type Y dwarfs in the future. In addition, a spectrum was also taken of one possibly variable object of unknown type that does not actually exhibit proper motion. There are 432 objects of interest awaiting verification, of which 38 are Y dwarf candidates.

In July 2018 an update on the project's blog stated that in total 42 brown dwarfs had been spectroscopically confirmed from a list of 879 candidates. Fourteen of those confirmed are closer to the solar system than 20 parsecs (65 light-years).

As of July 2019, there are 1305 candidate objects to be followed up, of which there are 131 confirmed objects: 70 dwarfs of type T and 61 dwarfs of type L. Of the candidate and confirmed brown dwarfs, 55 of them are closer to the solar system than 20 parsecs. There are also roughly 100 Y dwarf candidates.

At the 235th meeting of the American Astronomical Society in January 2020 a summary of the current status of the project was presented and this included 1503 L, T and Y dwarf candidates. In total 221 spectra have been taken of candidate objects.

== Published discoveries ==
=== WISEA 1101+5400 ===
In June 2017, it was announced that Backyard Worlds had made its first official discovery: a brown dwarf designated WISEA 1101+5400, of spectral type T5.5 and located 34 parsecs (111 light years) from Earth. A paper announcing the discovery was accepted for publication in Astrophysical Journal Letters, and Backyard Worlds now holds the record among all Zooniverse projects as having the shortest time from project launch to first publication.

=== LSPM J0207+3331 ===
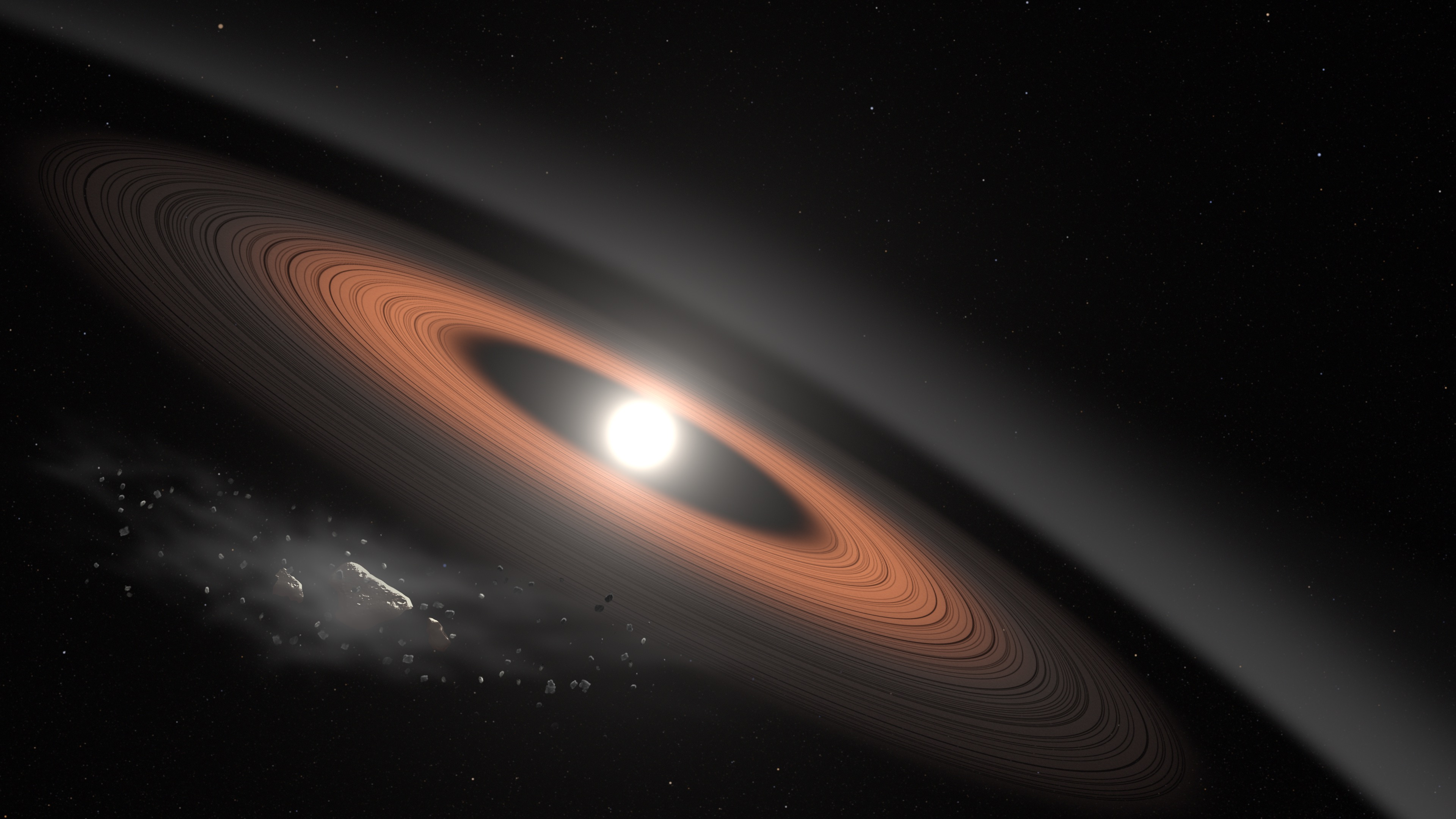
Artist's impression of the white dwarf LSPM J0207+3331 surrounded by a long-lived system of dust rings

In October 2018, a participant in the project discovered LSPM J0207+3331 – the oldest and coldest white dwarf known to host a circumstellar disk, despite being 3 billion years old. The time since this star became a white dwarf is far longer than the expected timescale for such disks to be cleared from a system. The disk consists of two rings at different temperatures. This star has been studied with the Keck telescope and is the subject of ongoing research.

=== W2150AB ===
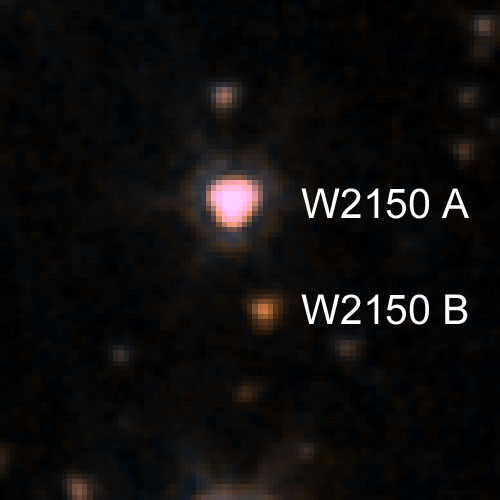
Image of W2150AB taken with the Spitzer Space Telescope. This binary brown dwarf system was discovered by volunteers of the project

At the 235th meeting of the American Astronomical Society in January 2020 the discovery of the wide brown dwarf binary W2150AB was presented by Jacqueline Faherty. The L1+T8 co-moving system is separated by 341 au, being one of three brown dwarf binary systems where both objects are easily resolved by ground-based telescopes. The system has the lowest gravitational binding energy for a brown dwarf binary that is not young and with the primary being a L-dwarf or later.

=== WISE J0830+2837 ===
The discovery of WISE J0830+2837, the first Y-dwarf discovered by volunteers was also presented at the 235th meeting by project scientist Daniella Bardalez Gagliuffi. The Y-dwarf was not detected by the Hubble Space Telescope, but the Spitzer Space Telescope did detect this object due to it observing at longer wavelengths of light. It is about 11.2 parsec (36.5 light years) distant and has a temperature of about 350 K (77 °C or 170 °F). This estimated temperature would place it between the majority of the Y-dwarf population so far identified and WISE 0855−0714, the coldest object of this type known.

=== T subdwarfs ===
A paper was published in the Astrophysical Journal in July 2020 reporting the discovery of two unusual brown dwarfs; WISEA J041451.67-585456.7 was discovered by Backyard Worlds volunteers and WISEA J181006.18-101000.5 by the NEOWISE Proper Motion Survey, also with the aid of a Backyard Worlds citizen scientist. These high-proper motion objects display unique colors and near-infrared spectra that do not fully match current models. The models producing the best matches to the spectra imply the brown dwarfs have [Fe/H] ≤ -1, meaning they have extremely sub-solar metallicity, containing far lower amounts of elements heavier than hydrogen or helium compared to the Sun. The estimates from the model spectra suggest that these objects have up to 30 times less iron than typical for known brown dwarfs. The authors argue that the spectral properties combined with the estimated low temperatures of approximately 1200-1400 K make these brown dwarfs likely the first extreme subdwarfs of the T spectral class (esdTs) to be identified. The extremely low metallicity implies these brown dwarfs are very old, approximately 10 billion years, as the galaxy at this time would have featured lower quantities of heavy elements. This provides evidence that substellar objects were able to form in the low metallicity environment of the Milky Way's past.

A study by Lodieu et al. observed WISE1810 with a range of ground-based telescopes, using imaging and spectroscopy. They find a closer distance of 8.9+0.7
−0.6 parsec, a radius of 0.67+0.32
−0.20 R_{J} and a mass of 17+56
−12 M_{J}. This makes WISE1810 the closest extreme ultra-cool subdwarf and the closest extreme metal-poor brown dwarf known to science, as of June 2022. The optical and infrared spectrum does not show any methane or carbon monoxide absorption, which is expected at these temperatures of about 800 K, and the WISE photometry suggest a depleted methane atmosphere. Only H_{2} CIA and water vapor absorption is detected, suggesting a carbon-deficient and metal-poor atmosphere, or alternatively an oxygen-enhanced atmosphere.

A study in 2024 discovered three additional T-type subdwarfs and introduced a new classification system for T subdwarfs. This system classified WISE 1810 as a esdT3: and WISE 0414 as a esdT6:. The study also found L and T dwarfs with unusual galactic orbits. 2MASS J053253.46+824646.5 (previous known L subdwarf) and CWISE J113010.07+313944.7 (mild T-subdwarf) were identified as possible members of the Thamnos stellar streams. These two brown dwarfs are on a retrograde Galactic orbit. 2MASS J0532+8246 was later observed with JWST and found to be a likely member of Thamnos. CWISE J155349.96+693355.2 was found to be a possible member of the Helmi stream (prograde galactic orbit). Follow-up spectroscopy with JWST did however result in WISE J1553+3139 to be classified as part of the Gaia-Enceladus structure. Three T dwarfs (SDSS J014016.89+015054.1, CWISEP J111055.12-174738.2, and CWISEP J145837.91+173450.1) are found to have high metallicity and might be part of the high velocity thick disk. This population originates from the inner Milky Way and was scattered outwards.

=== 95 cold brown dwarfs observed with Spitzer ===
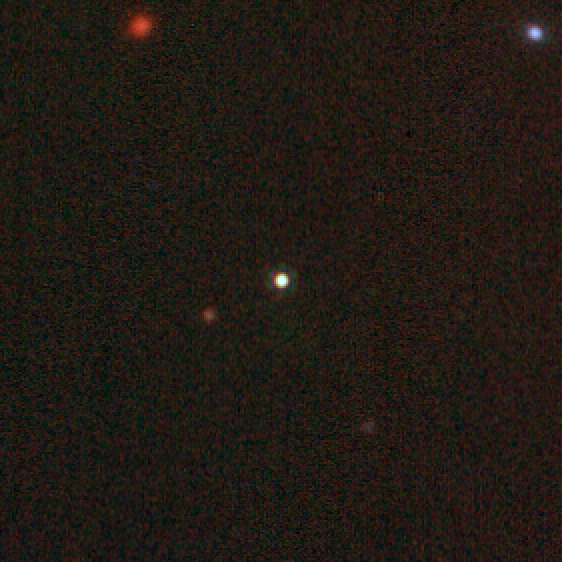
WISEU 0503−5648, as seen by JWST MIRI. This object (likely a Y-dwarf) was first published in 2020

In August 2020, the Backyard Worlds team published a paper in the Astrophysical Journal detailing follow-up conducted using the Spitzer Space Telescope on a sample of the coldest discoveries that had been made before the telescope was decommissioned. 95 had Spitzer mid-infrared colors consistent with being a cold brown dwarf, with 75 of these having their proper motion confirmed by comparison to their position in WISE images. Among the discoveries highlighted as most significant were; 3 possible T subdwarfs based on high tangential velocity estimates, a rare widely separated T8 companion to the white dwarf LSPM J0055+5948, and 5 new Y dwarfs, four of which (including the previously published WISE J0830+2837) where Spitzer colors indicate they have spectral types Y1 or later, with only at most 6 of these coldest set of brown dwarfs previously being known. The T8 companion to the white dwarf LSPM J0055+5948 could be the oldest (7-13 billion years old) brown dwarf known to science, together with Wolf 1130C (>10 billion years old).

=== 3006 motion-confirmed ultracool dwarf candidates ===
In May 2026 the project published 3006 motion-confirmed ultracool dwarf candidates, discovered by 65 citizen scientists. These include 2357 L-type and 649 T-type dwarfs. The list also includes 28 new co-moving companions and 9 candidate binaries. This sample would double the number of known L- and T-dwarfs, if these candidates are confirmed to be real dwarfs. 1937 of these objects were observed with SPHEREx and therefore have spectroscopy that can be accessed via the MOCA database.

=== Co-moving benchmark systems ===
The Backyard Worlds project found additional co-moving systems. 34 low-mass co-moving companions were discovered in 2022 with the NOIRLab Source Catalog DR2. Later in March 2024 an additional 89 ultracool dwarf companions were identified. This study increased the number of ultracool companions to FGK stars by about 42%. These benchmark system represent a wide variety of systems, including six systems with white dwarf hosts, systems with binary hosts or companions that are binaries, systems with old or young ages, systems with red or blue spectral types and systems with a wide separation of >1000 astronomical units (AU). One young co-moving system consists of GJ 900, a K7+M4+M6 triple star system and the T9-dwarf CW2335+0142, which is a planetary-mass object (~10.5 M_{J}). Another notable system is CW0627−0028AB, which is a wide T0blue+T3 dwarf system or a possible triple (L5+T2.5)+T3 system. If the distance is confirmed, it would be the widest substellar binary discovered at a separation of about 860 AU. The brown dwarf companion CWISE J060202.17-462447.8 (~52 M_{J}) to the white dwarf WD J060159.98-462534.40 is an additional contender for the oldest brown dwarf with an age of 10.9+2.6
−2.0 billion years. Additional M+T co-moving systems were discovered in April 2024 in a collaborative work together with the CatWISE team. 13 new systems were discovered, representing a 60% increase of the number of M+T systems. The sample includes young and old objects, including the candidate planetary-mass companion 2MASS J05581644–4501559 B and the brown dwarf UCAC3 52–1038 B, which is on a wide 7100 AU orbit. UCAC3 52–1038 B was later found to be a mildly metal-poor old brown dwarf. In December 2024 a team published a list of 51 ultracool dwarfs that are co-moving with white dwarfs. Some of these were also discovered by backyard worlds citizen scientists. In February 2025 follow-up observations of 10 candidate brown dwarfs orbiting white dwarfs were published. 7 turned out to be brown dwarf companions, one turned out to be a brown dwarf binary, one turned out to be the companion to a star and one was not confirmed due to blending in the spectrum.

==== JWST observation of CW2106 ====
CWISE J210640.16+250729.0 (also called CW2106) was found to be a T dwarf near the L/T transition and it co-moves with the star BD+24 4329. The brown dwarf was discovered by Backyard Worlds volunteers. CW2106 was observed with Magellan/FIRE, JWST NIRSpec and JWST MIRI. The star BD+24 4329 was observed with a telescope at the McDonald Observatory. The Backyard Worlds research team found that the near-infrared spectrum of CW2106 can be reproduced by a cloudy atmosphere, but the mid-infrared spectrum is missing the cloudy silicate feature. The researchers interpret this as clouds located in the deepest observable part of the atmosphere. The clouds are made up mostly of enstatite, removing 23% of oxygen from the atmosphere.

=== Additional discoveries ===
This list contains additional notable discoveries by the Backyard Worlds: Planet 9 project.

Name	Distance (ly)	Spectral type	Mass (M_{J})	Temperature K (°C)	note	Ref
WISEA 1930−2059	30.7+1.5 −1.4	>Y1		367±79 (94)	Cold and nearby Y-dwarf candidate	
WISEU 0503−5648	33.2+1.4 −1.3	>Y1		367±79 (94)	Target for JWST follow-up observations	
CWISE J2035–4936	265.8±4.9	M8pec			Companion to a red dwarf, underluminous and peculiar spectrum	
2MASS J13173072+4833343	127.2±0.3	M8.5	80.2+0.5 −1.8		Orbits a white dwarf at 79 au. The white dwarf has an estimated age of about 5.5 Billion years.	
CWISE 0738−6643	142.2+33.9 −27.4	esd(?)T5±1.2			candidate extreme subdwarf of spectral type T	
CW2335+0142 (Gliese 900 b)	67.97±0.03	T9	10.5		Very long orbital separation from its host star (actually a three-star system), 12,000 astronomical units	
WISEA 1553+6933	125.9+15.0 −13.7	sdT4±0.5		1076±89 (803)	confirmed subdwarf of spectral type T, might be kinematically extreme	
CWISE 2217−1454	128.5+31.0 −24.8	esd(?)T5.5±1.2			candidate extreme subdwarf of spectral type T, potentially most metal-poor T-dwarf from faint H- and K_{s}-band (strong collision induced absorption)	
WISE 1534−1043	53.2+4.6 −3.9	sdY?		<500 (<227)	Likely first subdwarf of spectral type Y, extreme blue color with Spitzer ch1-ch2, while very red in J-ch2	
HP Draconis C	260.9±1.6		471.3±31.4	7087±205 (6814)	White dwarf, separated by 1140 au from the eclipsing binary HP Draconis	
Ross 19 B	56.9	T9.5±1.5	15 - 40	500+115 −100 (227)	Orbits the metal-poor and old (~7.2 Billion years) red dwarf Ross 19 A with a projected distance of 9900 au. The pair has a very low gravitational binding energy, between $4.8\times 10^{39}$ and $3.0\times 10^{40}$ ergs, near the theoretical minimum of 10^{40} ergs for substellar binaries.	
CWISE 0617+1945 AB	28.2±5.7	L2+L4		1853+40 −52 (1580)	nearby brown dwarf binary co-discovered by Backyard Worlds volunteers	
2MASS J22410186-4500298	189.2±6.5	L2			Forms with LEHPM 5005 a co-moving system. LEHPM is reported in the discovery as a possible M-dwarf binary.	
BD+60 1417b	144±13	L8γ	10-20	1303±74	Confirmed exoplanet orbiting around a young K0 star, with a projected separation of 1662 astronomical units.	
CWISE J052306.42-015355.4	≤222	esdT(?)			extreme T subdwarf candidate	
CWISE J0146-0508AB	~130	L4+L8(blue)	72±6; 66±10	1720±150; 1340±140	The widest known (as of Feb 2022) brown dwarf binary not in a star cluster or stellar association. The pair has a projected separation of 129 astronomical units.	
CWISE J0506+0738	104	L8γ-T0γ	7 ± 2	1140 ± 80	Candidate of the Beta Pictoris Moving Group. Very red near-infrared colors.	
W0727−3607	111	L7+T4			Candidate spectroscopic binary, or a single highly variable object	
W1036−5144	88	L7+T4			Candidate spectroscopic binary	
W1344−7320	65	L7+T7			Candidate spectroscopic binary	
W1055+5443	19.5-26	Y0pec	4–6	500±150	Bluest Spitzer colors among spectroscopically confirmed Y-dwarfs. Discovered by Caselden (BYW, CatWISE), Goodman (BYW) and Kirkpatrick (CatWISE)	
J1249+36		sdL	83–88		hypervelocity star with a low mass, moving at a high speed (initially estimated to be 600 km/s)	
CWISE J1848−8757	29	young L?			CatWISE team discovery, but also independently discovered by two BYW citizen scientists. Red J-W2 color, possibly young L-dwarf	
UPM J1040-3551 A+Ba+Bb	82	M4+T7+T8	246 + (11.5–34.6) + (9.4–28.3)	3200 ±50 (UPM J1040-3551A)	Young T-dwarfs, likely unresolved spectroscopic binary orbiting an M dwarf, with the less massive object having possibly planetary-mass	

== See also ==
- Amateur astronomy
- Citizen science

Zooniverse projects:

- The Daily Minor Planet
- Asteroid Zoo
- Disk Detective
- Galaxy Zoo
- Old Weather
- Planet Hunters
- SETILive
- The Milky Way Project
- Radio Galaxy Zoo
