= CWISE J0506+0738 =

Young substellar object

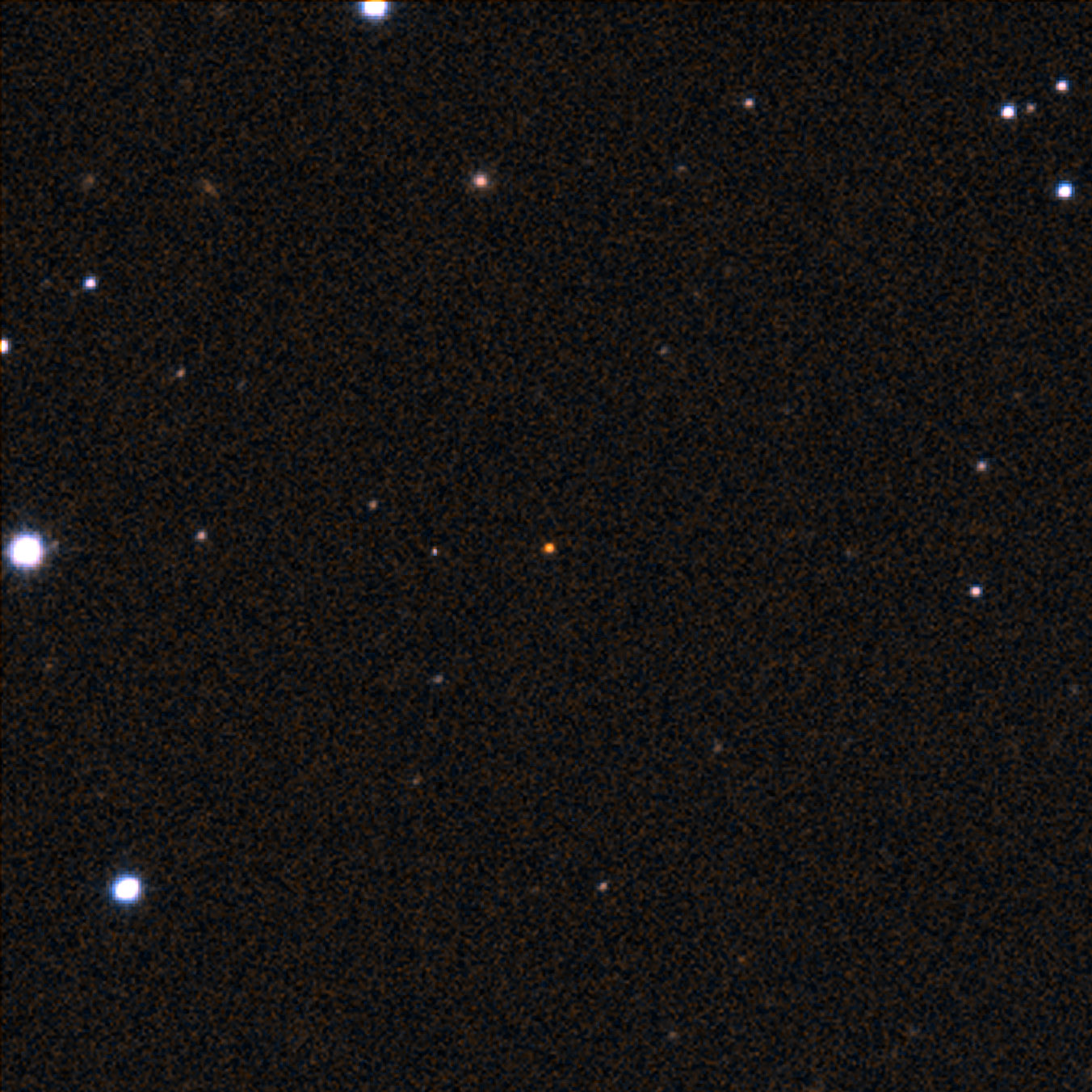
- CWISE J0506+0738 (orange "star" in the center); Credit: UKIDSS Hemisphere Survey; Processing: Melina Thévenot

Observation data Epoch J2000 Equinox J2000
- Constellation: Orion
- Right ascension: 05^{h} 06^{m} 26.94^{s}
- Declination: +07° 38′ 43.6″

Characteristics
- Evolutionary stage: Substellar object
- Spectral type: L8γ-T0γ
- Apparent magnitude (J_{MKO}): 18.487 ±0.017
- Apparent magnitude (K_{MKO}): 15.513 ±0.022

Astrometry
Radial velocity (R_{v})	+16.3+8.8 −7.7 km/s
Proper motion (μ)	RA: 31.5 ±2.6 mas/yr Dec.: -82.7 ±2.7 mas/yr
Distance	104+13 −9 ly (32+4 −3 pc)

Details
Mass	7 ±2 M_{Jup}
Radius	1.32 ±0.03 R_{Jup}
Luminosity (bolometric)	10^{−4.55 ± 0.12} L_{☉}
Temperature	1140 ±80 K
Age	22 ±6 Myr

Other designations
- CWISE J050626.96+073842.4

Database references
SIMBAD	data

CWISE J0506+0738 (also known as CWISE J050626.96+073842.4) is an exceptionally red substellar object, likely located in the Beta Pictoris moving group.

== Discovery ==
CWISE J0506+0738 was first noticed as a high proper motion object in WISE data by volunteers of the citizen science project Backyard Worlds. These volunteers are Austin Rothermich, Arttu Sainio, Sam Goodman, Dan Caselden, and Martin Kabatnik. Near- and mid-infrared photometry were collected by the project team of astronomers, led by Adam C. Schneider (USNO). This showed that this object was likely a L7.5 dwarf with unusual red near-infrared colors, redder than the planetary-mass object PSO J318.5−22. Refined UKIDSS photometry showed a color redder than any free-floating brown dwarf, with (J − K)_{MKO} = 2.97 ± 0.03 mag and J_{MKO} − W2 = 4.94 ± 0.02 mag. This makes CWISE J0506+0738 similar to planetary-mass companions near the L/T transition that also show exceptional red colors, with only 2M1207b and HD 206893B being redder than CWISE J0506+0738. The same team also discovered VHS J1831‑5513, which is similar to CWISE J0506+0738 in its red color and potential low mass.

== Observations ==
Spectroscopy was obtained with Keck/NIRES. CWISE J0506+0738 does not fit with any field L-dwarf and has stronger water vapor absorption when compared to the L7-standard, which is a sign of low surface gravity. The best match provides the L7 VL-G object PSO J318.5−22 (VL-G means very low gravity), which is a planetary-mass object. But even here the red color of the H- and K-band is noticeable. Additionally CWISE J0506+0738 shows absorption features likely due to the presence of methane, potentially making this object a T-dwarf. The astrometry is consistent with a membership of the Beta Pictoris group, but a measurement of the parallax is needed to confirm this. The mass was estimated using the age of this group and preliminary luminosity of CWISE J0506+0738, which resulted in a mass of 7±2 M_{J}. This would make the object a planetary-mass object. The red color and the spectral type near the L/T transition is often connected to variability, an edge-on inclination and patchy clouds. CWISE J0506+0738 is therefore a good target for future variability studies. First evidence of J-band variability comes from follow-up observation with UKIDSS, which showed an increase in brightness by 0.27 mag.
