= PSO J318.5−22 =

Extrasolar free-floating planet

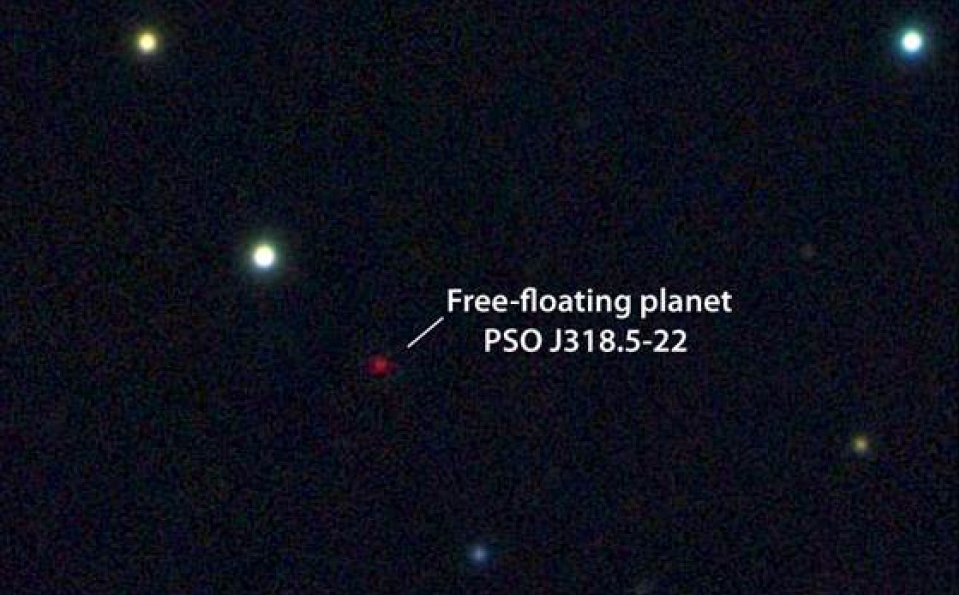
- Pan-STARRS image of PSO J318.5−22

Observation data Epoch J2000 Equinox ICRS
- Constellation: Capricornus
- Right ascension: 21^{h} 14^{m} 08.0256^{s}
- Declination: −22° 51′ 35.838″

Characteristics
- Evolutionary stage: Free-floating planetary-mass object
- Spectral type: L7.5
- Variable type: rotational variable

Astrometry
Radial velocity (R_{v})	6.0+0.8 −1.1 km/s
Proper motion (μ)	RA: −136.3 ± 1 mas/yr Dec.: 144.3 ± 1.3 mas/yr
Parallax (π)	45.1±1.7 mas
Distance	72 ± 3 ly (22.2 ± 0.8 pc)

Details
Mass	8.3 ± 0.5 M_{Jup}
Radius	1.464 ± 0.010 R_{Jup}
Luminosity (bolometric)	10^{−4.52 ± 0.04} L_{☉}
Surface gravity (log g)	4.01 ±0.03 cgs
Temperature	1127+24 −26 K
Rotation	8.45 ± 0.05 hours
Rotational velocity (v sin i)	17.5+2.3 −2.8 km/s
Age	23 ±3 Myr

Other designations
- 2MASS J21140802-2251358, CNS5 5236, TIC 24266526, WISE J211408.13-225137.3

Database references
SIMBAD	data

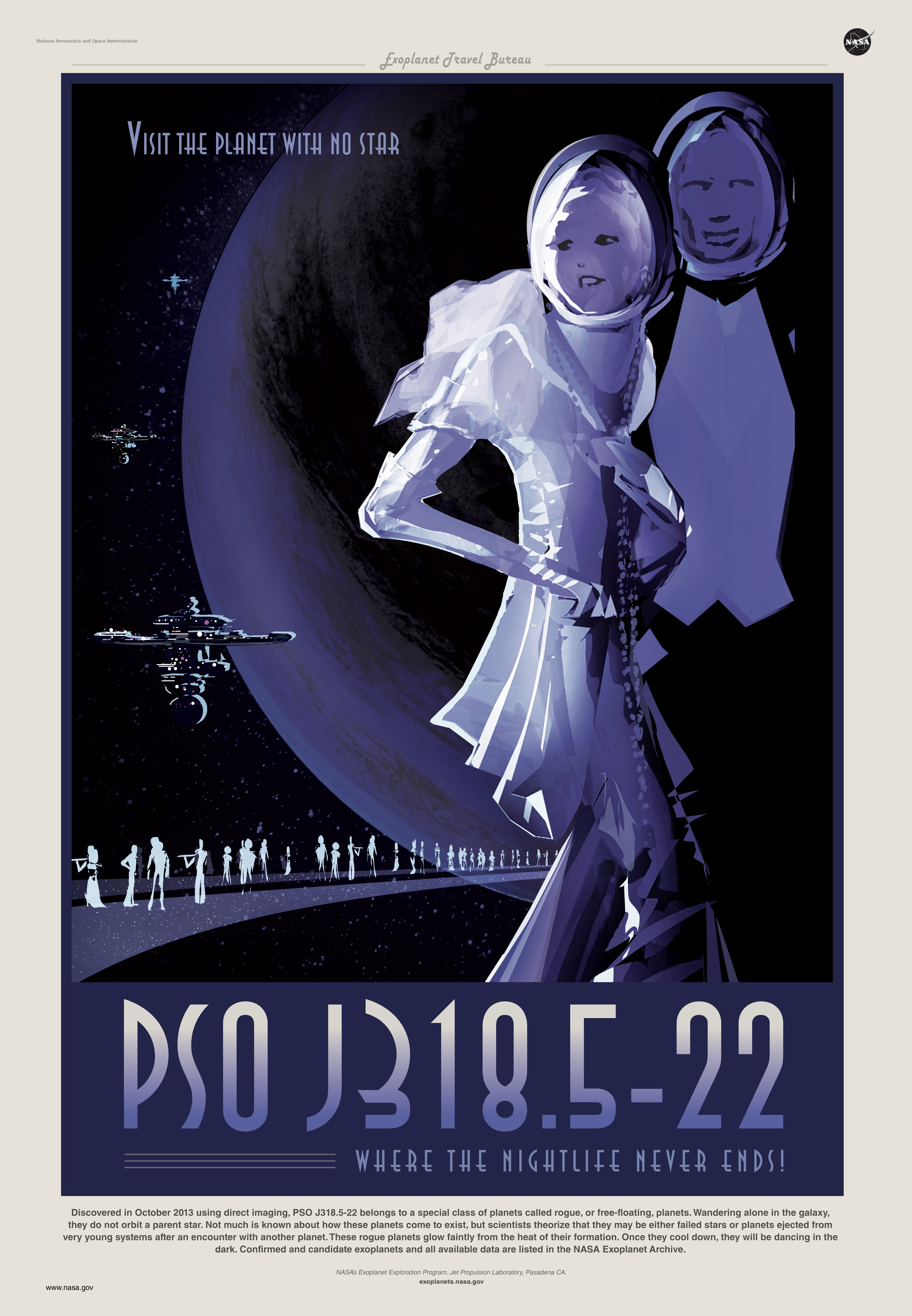
NASA Exoplanet Exploration Program "travel poster" for PSO J318.5−22

PSO J318.5−22 is an extrasolar planetary-mass object that does not orbit any star, an analog to directly imaged young gas giants. There is no consensus yet among astronomers whether the object should be referred to as a rogue planet, as a young brown dwarf, or as a sub-brown dwarf. It is approximately 80 light-years away and belongs to the Beta Pictoris moving group. The object was discovered in 2013 in images taken by the Pan-STARRS PS1 wide-field telescope. PSO J318.5-22's age is inferred to be 23 million years, the same age as the Beta Pictoris moving group. Based on its calculated temperature and age, it is classified under the brown dwarf spectral type L7.

== Discovery ==
PSO J318.5−22 was discovered in data of Pan-STARRS and 2MASS in 2013. Follow-up observations were carried out with URKIRT (photometry), NASA IRTF and Gemini North (both spectroscopy). The team leader, Michael Liu of the Institute for Astronomy at the University of Hawaii, stated, "We have never before seen an object free-floating in space that looks like this. It has all the characteristics of young planets found around other stars, but it is drifting out there all alone."

== Characteristics ==
The spectrum of PSO J318.5−22 is in its redness in between low-gravity brown dwarfs and the planetary-mass companion 2M1207b, which is redder than PSO J318.5−22. The Gemini spectrum also shows several absorption features, such as weak iron hydride, sodium and potassium. Their weakness and a triangular H-band spectrum indicate a low gravity. Molecular absorption from water vapor and carbon monoxide are also detected. Low abundance of methane was detected in the L-band Keck/NIRSPEC spectrum of PSO J318.5−22. The team found that strong vertical mixing and photospheric clouds can explain the spectrum of PSO J318.5−22.

PSO J318.5−22 was initially suspected to be a member of the Beta Pictoris Moving group, but radial velocity was not available at this time. Later radial velocity measurement with the help of high-resolution spectroscopy from Gemini North confirmed it as a Beta Pictoris member. This group also revised the physical properties due to Beta Pictoris being older than previously thought. It has a mass of 8.3 ± 0.5 M_{J}.

== Variability and Clouds ==
Variability was first detected with the New Technology Telescope, showing a rotation period larger than 5 hours and an amplitude of 7% to 10% in the Js band. The team found that the variability is likely driven by an inhomogeneous cloud cover. Later the rotational velocity helped to constrain the inclination to >29° and the rotation period to 5–10.2 hours. Later PSO J318.5−22 was observed simultaneously with Hubble WFC3 and Spitzer IRAC. This helped to narrow down the rotation period to 8.6 ± 0.1 hours and the inclination to 56.2 ± 8.1°. The amplitude is 3.4 ± 0.1% for Spitzer channel 2 (4.5 μm) and 4.4–5.8% for WFC3 (1.07–1.67 μm). The near-infrared and mid-infrared light curves have a phase offset between 200° and 210°, likely due to a depth-dependent longitudinal atmospheric structure. Another group did observe PSO J318.5−22 with the NTT Js and Ks-band and found a rotation period of 8.45 ± 0.05 hours and an amplitude of 2.4 ± 0.2 % in Js and 0.48 ± 0.08 % in Ks.

=== Cloud composition ===
Estimated temperatures inside its clouds exceed 1,100 K (800 °C). The clouds, made of hot dust and molten iron, show how widespread clouds are in planets and planet-like objects. However, by 2020, modeling showed that the brightness variability could not be unambiguously attributed to clouds. The clouds are suspected to be a patchy haze layer over thick iron clouds. This patchy haze layer could be made of sodium sulfide, chromium or manganese sulfide. Observations with the James Webb Space Telescope found a pronounced absorption features at 10 Micron. This was reproduced with high-altitude cloud layer with small amorphous SiO grains. The researchers hypothesize that their observations probe homogeneous cloud nucleation of SiO cloud seeds from the gas phase. At lower latitudes these cloud seeds could then form into clouds. This is consistent with a "top-down" cloud formation approach. The clouds are likely made of a thick iron cloud deck and a silicate cloud layers at top. The observations do however challenge the models used to describe the atmosphere.

== Formation ==
Current theories about such objects include the possibility that gravitational perturbations may have kicked them out of their planetary systems soon after they formed through planetary accretion, or they may have been formed by some other means.

== See also ==
- CFBDSIR 2149−0403
- 2MASS J1119–1137
- OTS 44
- Cha 110913−773444
- CWISE J0506+0738
- Jupiter
