= ZTF J1239+8347 =

Mass transferring brown dwarf binary

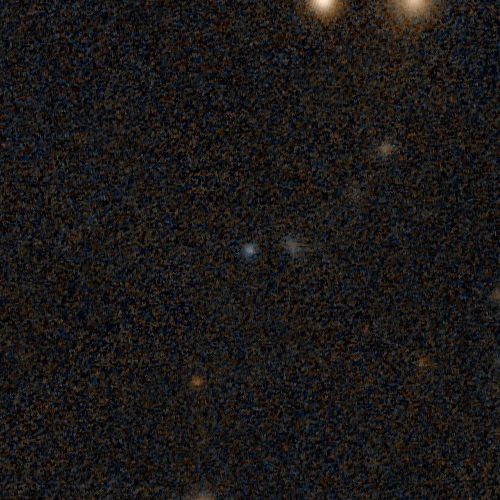
- Pan-STARRS image of ZTF J1239+8347 (faint blue dot at center)

Observation data Epoch J2000.0 Equinox ICRS
- Constellation: Cepheus
- Right ascension: 12^{h} 39^{m} 55.382^{s}
- Declination: +83° 47′ 07.52″

Characteristics
- Spectral type: L + L
- Apparent magnitude (g): 20.3±0.7
- Apparent magnitude (i): 21.0±0.5
- Apparent magnitude (J): 20.3±0.8
- Apparent magnitude (K): 21.2±1.2 (average ± semi-amplitude)

Astrometry
| Proper motion (μ) | RA: −22.7±0.5 mas/yr Dec.: −19.8±0.4 mas/yr |
| Distance | 1106+137 −101 ly (339+42 −31 pc) |

Orbit
| Primary | A (accretor) |
| Name | B (donor) |
| Period (P) | 57.41 min |

Details

A (accretor)
| Mass | 60–80 M_{Jup} |
| Radius | 1.20+0.15 −0.11 R_{Jup} |
| Temperature | ~1500 K |
| Age | 0.1–2.0 Gyr |

B (donor)
| Mass | 60–80 M_{Jup} |
| Radius | 0.9–1.4 R_{Jup} |
| Temperature | ≲1200 K |
| Age | 0.1–2.0 Gyr |

Other designations
- WD J123955.40+834707.51, Gaia DR3 1726297924930902400, Gaia DR2 1726297924930902400

Database references
| SIMBAD | data |

ZTF J1239+8347 is a binary system of brown dwarfs orbiting extremely close to each other with an orbital period of 57.41 minutes. It is located in the constellation Cepheus, about 1,110 light-years (339 pc) away from Earth. The system was first identified in various studies of the Gaia catalogues from 2018 to 2024, but it was not recognized as a binary brown dwarf until 2026.

The ZTF J1239+8347 system consists of two L-type brown dwarfs, each with masses between 60 and 80 Jupiter masses, similar radii as Jupiter, and effective temperatures of just over 1,000 K (730 °C; 1,340 °F). The brown dwarfs orbit so closely that they are undergoing mass transfer, where the more massive component (the accretor) is pulling material directly from the less massive component (the donor). The accreted material is concentrated into a narrow stream that directly impacts the accretor's atmosphere and heats it up, creating an 8,900 K (8,630 °C; 15,560 °F) hotspot that glows in blue and ultraviolet light. As the brown dwarfs orbit each other, the accretor's hotspot rotates in and out of view from Earth, which leads to periodic changes in the system's observed brightness.

ZTF J1239+8347 is the first mass-transferring binary brown dwarf discovered as of 2026 April. It is expected that these brown dwarfs will eventually merge to form a new star, although it is uncertain how long this will take.

== Discovery ==
This system was first catalogued by the Gaia satellite in its second data release (Gaia DR2) from 2018. A late 2018 study by Nicola Pietro Gentile Fusillo and colleagues first suggested that this system could be a white dwarf candidate, because Gaia DR2 measurements suggested it had a very dim absolute magnitude and blue color. The same team conducted another study of the Gaia Early DR3 (EDR3) catalogue in 2021 and found similar properties for the system, so it remained classified as a white dwarf candidate. During this time, the system had only been catalogued by Gaia, so it was known by its Gaia catalogue designation 1726297924930902400.

The variable brightness of the system was first reported in a 2023 analysis of Zwicky Transient Facility (ZTF) data by Liangliang Ren and colleagues, who had flagged it as an ellipsoidal variable-type binary white dwarf candidate. A 2024 study of Gaia DR3 data by Maya Steen and colleagues similarly flagged the system as a binary white dwarf candidate, classifying it as a cataclysmic variable. Both studies began calling the system by its J2000 equatorial coordinates, J1239+8347.

In March 2026, a team of astronomers led by Samuel Whitebook announced that ZTF J1239+8347 was actually a binary system of mass-transferring brown dwarfs, instead of white dwarfs. Their discovery was based on visible and near-infrared spectroscopy taken during 2024–2025, alongside photometric light curve measurements from other telescopes. This discovery makes ZTF J1239+8347 the first mass-transferring binary brown dwarf system known. The initial misclassification of ZTF J1239+8347 as a binary white dwarf suggests that there may be more misclassified binary brown dwarfs hidden in binary white dwarf catalogues.

== Location, distance, and proper motion ==
As its name suggests, ZTF J1239+8347 is located in the northern constellation Cepheus, at the equatorial coordinates of right ascension (RA) 12^{h} 39^{m} 55.382^{s} and declination (Dec) +83° 47′ 07.52″. Parallax measurements by the Gaia satellite has determined that the system's distance from Earth is 1,110 light-years (339 pc). The Gaia satellite has additionally measured ZTF J1239+8347's proper motion to be −22.7±0.5 milliarcseconds/year in RA and −19.8±0.4 milliarcseconds/year in Dec. This proper motion is relatively mild, which indicates that ZTF J1239+8347 was not kicked by a supernova.

== Binary system ==
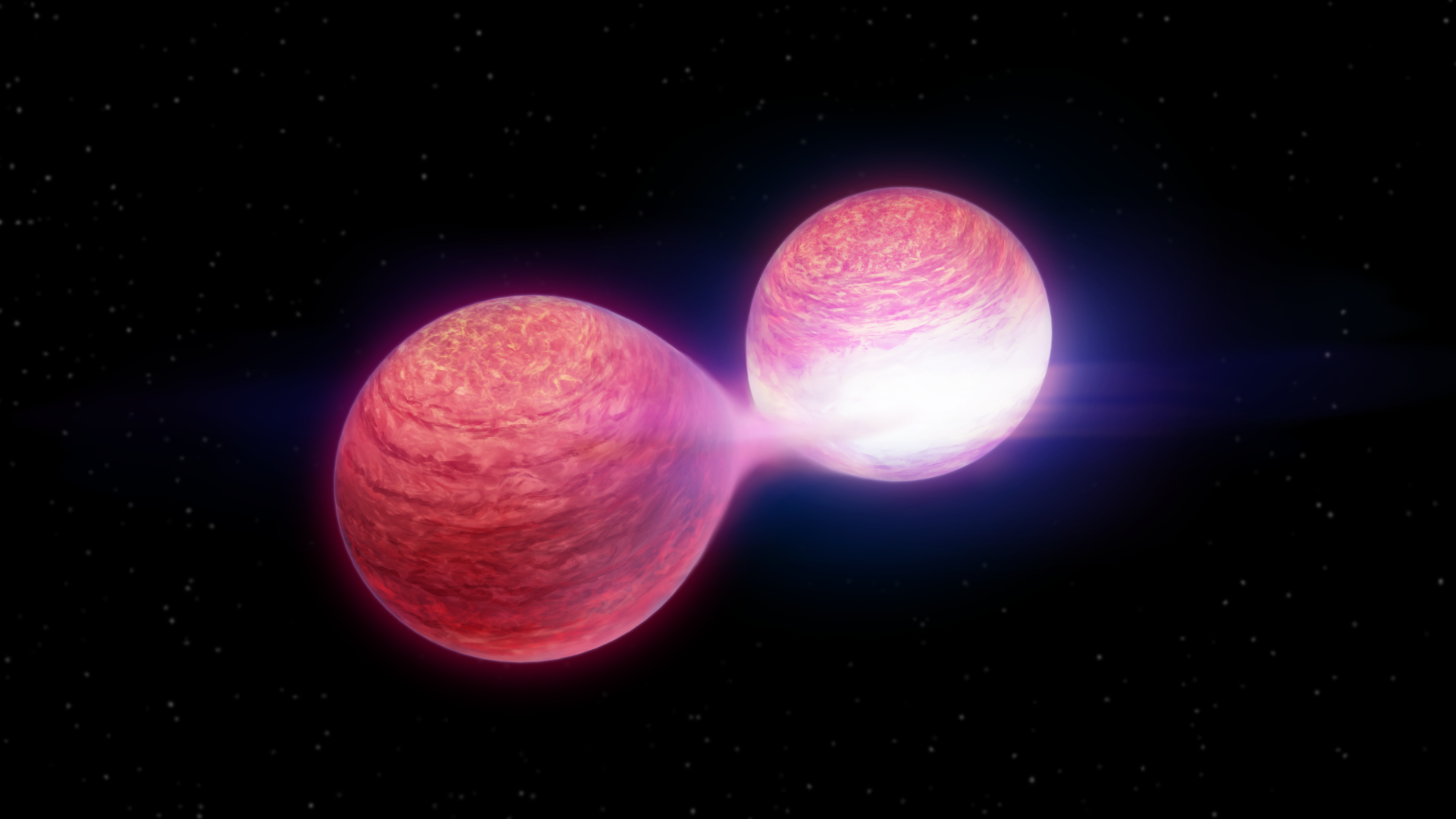
Artist's impression of the ZTF J1239+8347 system, depicting its mass transfer and hotspot on the accretor

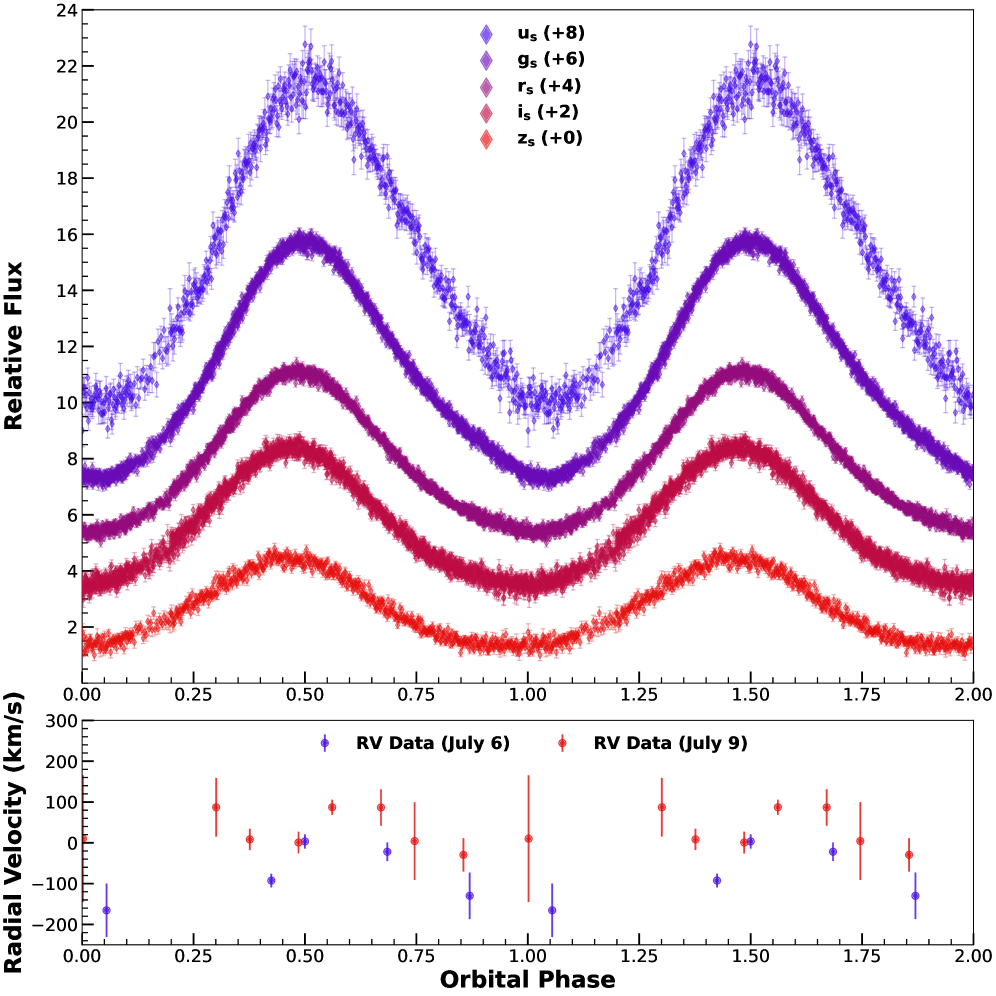
Optical and near-infrared light curves in five different photometric filters (top) and radial velocity measurements (bottom) of ZTF J1239+8347 over two orbital periods (or orbital phases).

The ZTF J1239+8347 system consists of two brown dwarfs orbiting extremely tightly around each other, revolving once every 57.41 minutes. The distance between the two brown dwarfs is smaller than the distance between Earth and its moon. Near-infrared spectroscopy suggests that the more massive brown dwarf has an effective temperature of about 1,500 K (1,230 °C; 2,240 °F), whereas the less massive brown dwarf has an effective temperature of up to 1,200 K (930 °C; 1,700 °F). Based on their near-infrared spectra, both brown dwarfs in the ZTF J1239+8347 system are inferred to be L-type brown dwarfs, each with masses between 60 and 80 Jupiter masses and ages between 0.1 and 2 billion years. Both brown dwarfs are inferred to have slightly inflated radii due to their high temperatures; the hotter and more massive component is estimated to have a radius of 1.20+0.15
−0.11 Jupiter radii, while the cooler and less massive component is estimated to have a radius of 0.9–1.4 Jupiter radii. Hydrogen and trace amounts of sodium and potassium in the brown dwarfs' atmospheres have been spectroscopically detected in the ZTF J1239+8347 system, in the form of absorption lines.

In the visible and ultraviolet spectrum, the ZTF J1239+8347 system exhibits a high luminosity that could be explained if it also had a high temperature of 8,904 ± 54 K (8,630.9 ± 54.0 °C; 15,567.5 ± 97.2 °F). This high temperature indicates that one of the brown dwarfs in the system is being heated, most likely as a result of mass transfer. The extremely short orbital period of the ZTF J1239+8347 system supports the conclusion that its brown dwarfs are undergoing mass transfer.

In the process of mass transfer (also known as Roche lobe overflow), the more massive component (the accretor) actively pulls material directly from the less massive component (the donor). The accreted material is concentrated into a narrow stream that directly impacts the accretor's atmosphere and heats it up, creating an 8,900 K (8,630 °C; 15,560 °F) hotspot that glows in blue and ultraviolet light. Due to the Coriolis effect and possibly strong magnetic fields of the brown dwarfs, the stream of material may be deflected above or below the accretor's equator. As the brown dwarfs orbit each other, the accretor's hotspot rotates in and out of view from Earth, which leads to periodic changes in the system's observed brightness. Light curve analysis shows that the system's peak-to-trough brightness amplitude is very large (>2 magnitudes) in ultraviolet, but decreases over longer wavelengths.

Based on the light curve of ZTF J1239+8347, the hotspot of the accretor is estimated to span a radius of 0.60+0.07
−0.06 Jupiter radii over its atmosphere. Slight asymmetries in the system's light curve suggest that the hotspot is extended longitudinally over the accretor's atmosphere, possibly as a result strong winds in the accretor. At maximum brightness, the visible spectrum of ZTF J1239+8347 shows prominent hydrogen absorption features, which implies that the accretor's hotspot glow is originating from inside the accretor's hydrogen-rich atmosphere or envelope. However, the ZTF J1239+8347 system also shows visible hydrogen emission lines during minimum brightness, when the accretor's hotspot is out of view; this may be caused by either reprocessing in the accretor's atmosphere, or the donor reflecting light from the accretor's hotspot.

The origin of the ZTF J1239+8347 binary system is unclear. Whitebook and colleagues suggested in 2026 that a third star might have gravitationally pushed the brown dwarfs closer together, leading to their currently tight orbit. The brown dwarfs' orbits are expected to decay over time due to gravitational radiation and magnetic braking, but the timescale for this process is uncertain. The brown dwarfs will eventually merge to form a new star, with their combined mass large enough to initiate nuclear fusion.
