= WISEA 1101+5400 =

Brown dwarf

WISEA J110125.95+540052.8
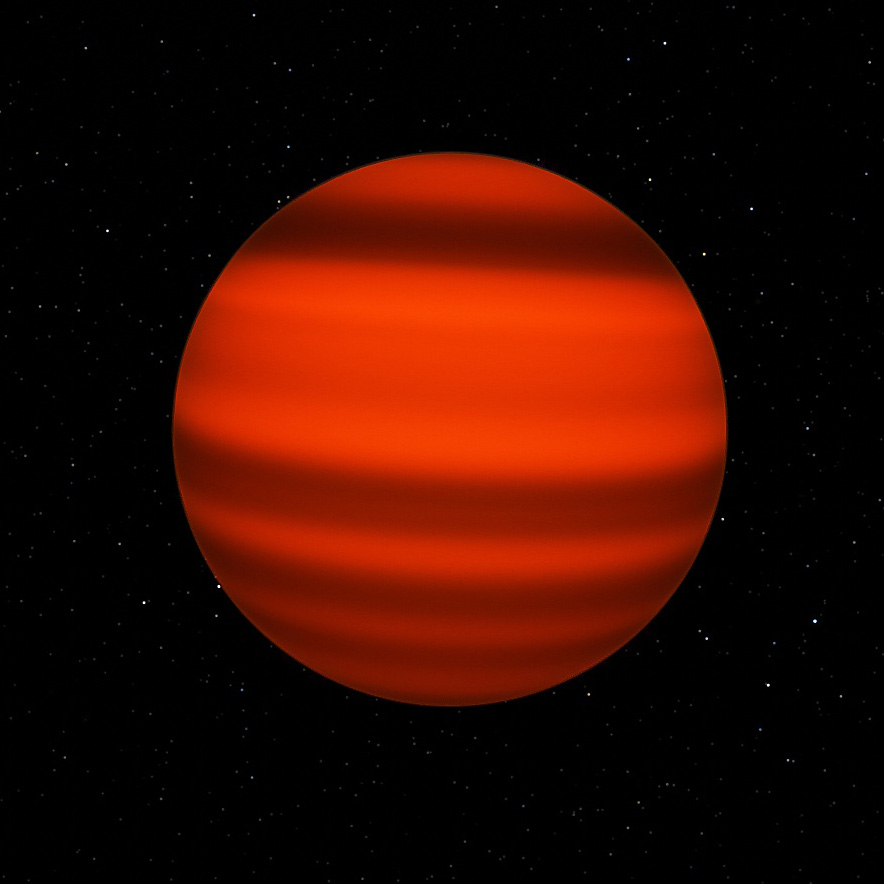
- Artist's impression of WISEA 1101+5400; Credit: SpaceEngine PRO, Kvasyrr

Observation data Epoch J2014.87 Equinox J2000
- Constellation: Ursa Major
- Right ascension: 11^{h} 01^{m} 25.95^{s}
- Declination: +54° 00′ 52.8″

Characteristics
- Evolutionary stage: Brown dwarf
- Spectral type: T5.5 ± 0.5
- Apparent magnitude (K): 17.112 ± 0.257
- Apparent magnitude (W1): 17.124 ± 0.118
- Apparent magnitude (W2): 15.371 ± 0.087

Astrometry
Proper motion (μ)	RA: -719 ± 10 mas/yr Dec.: +56 ± 23 mas/yr
Distance	34 ± 5 pc

Other designations
- WISE J110125.95+540052.8, ALLWISE J110125.95+540052.8, WISE J110125.99+540052.8

Database references
SIMBAD	data

WISEA 1101+5400 (full name WISEA J110125.95+540052.8) is a T-type brown dwarf (specifically T5.5) approximately 100 light-years away in the constellation Ursa Major. It was discovered in March 2017 by members of the citizen science project Backyard Worlds. Initial photometric analysis suggested it was a T5.5 dwarf, which was later confirmed by a spectrum of the object obtained with the NASA Infrared Telescope Facility. It is the first confirmed brown dwarf found by the project.

The brown dwarf was identified by several volunteers, including the therapist Rosa Castro, Bob Fletcher, Khasan Mokaev and Tamara Stajic. WISEA 1101+5400 was discovered six days after the launch of the project and the discovery was the fastest publication for any Zooniverse project at the time of the publication.

The discovery of this brown dwarf allowed the backyard worlds collaboration to estimate the amount of new brown dwarfs the project could discover. This was allowed due to the fact that the brown dwarf is one magnitude fainter than any brown dwarf previously discovered with proper motion surveys. The team estimated that the project would discover 37+39
−21 new L-dwarfs, 77+41
−31 T-dwarfs and 6+7
−4 Y-dwarfs. As of July 2019 the project did meet this estimate with spectroscopically confirmed T- and L-dwarfs (70 T-dwarfs and 61 L-dwarfs), but exceeded this estimate by brown dwarf candidates (1305).
