= NGC 1493 =

Galaxy in the constellation Horologium

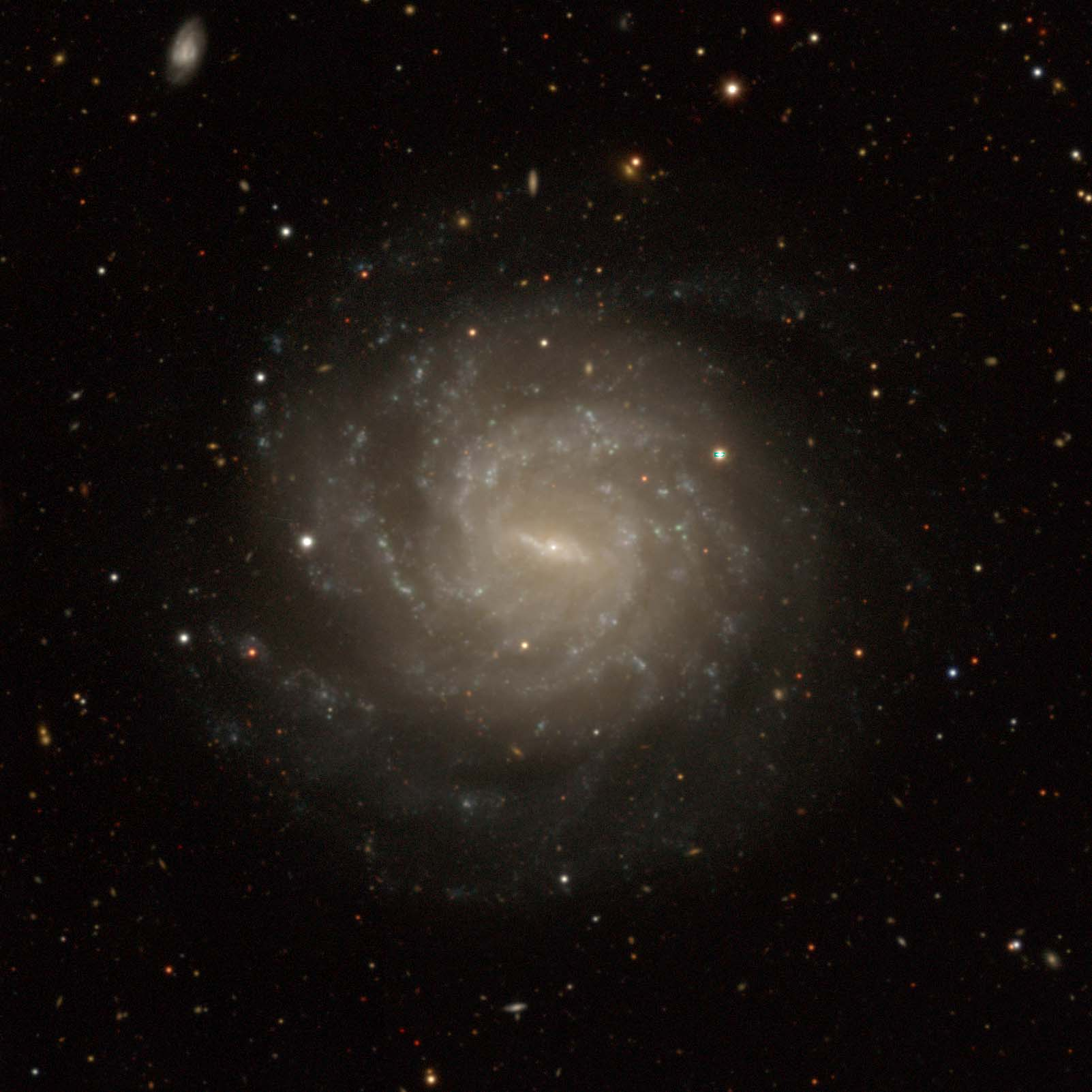
- NGC 1493 imaged by Legacy Surveys

Observation data (J2000 epoch)
- Constellation: Horologium
- Right ascension: 03^{h} 57^{m} 27.4555^{s}
- Declination: −46° 12′ 38.554″
- Redshift: 0.003512
- Heliocentric radial velocity: 1053 ± 1 km/s
- Distance: 48.3 ± 3.4 Mly (14.81 ± 1.04 Mpc)
- Group or cluster: NGC 1493 Group (LGG 106)
- Apparent magnitude (V): 11.3

Characteristics
- Type: SB(r)cd
- Size: ~58,300 ly (17.89 kpc) (estimated)
- Apparent size (V): 2.8′ × 2.8′

Other designations
- ESO 249- G 033, IRAS 03558-4621, 2MASX J03572738-4612386, PGC 14163

NGC 1493 is a barred spiral galaxy in the constellation of Horologium. Its velocity with respect to the cosmic microwave background is 1004 ± 4 km/s, which corresponds to a Hubble distance of 48.3 ± 3.4 Mly (14.81 ± 1.04 Mpc). In addition, six non redshift measurements give a closer distance of 35.38 ± 1.71 Mly (10.848 ± 0.525 Mpc). The galaxy was discovered by Scottish astronomer James Dunlop on 2 September 1826.

The SIMBAD database lists NGC 1493 as a Seyfert II Galaxy, i.e. it has a quasar-like nucleus with very high surface brightnesses whose spectra reveal strong, high-ionisation emission lines, but unlike quasars, the host galaxy is clearly detectable.

== Morphology ==
Eskridge, Frogel, and Pogge published a paper in 2002 describing the morphology of 205 closely spaced spiral or lenticular galaxies. The observations were made in the H-band of the infrared and in the B-band (blue). Eskridge and colleagues described NGC 1493 as a:

Nuclear point source embedded in elliptical bulge with a small, high-contrast bar. Flocculent spiral pattern emerges, with structure apparent starting at the ends of the bar. The arms are moderately tightly wound. Arms have many bright knots, and at low light levels there is evidence for up to four arms, each with multiple segments.

== NGC 1493 group ==
According to A.M. Garcia, NGC 1493 is the namesake of the NGC 1493 galaxy group (also known as LGG 106). This group contains six galaxies, including IC 2000 (galaxy), NGC 1483, NGC 1494, PGC 13979, and PGC 14125.

== Supernova ==
One supernova has been observed in NGC 1493. SN 2024abfo (Type II, mag. 16.793) was discovered by ATLAS on 15 November 2024.

== See also ==
- List of NGC objects (1001–2000)
