= BD+60 1417b =

Exoplanet

BD+60 1417 b
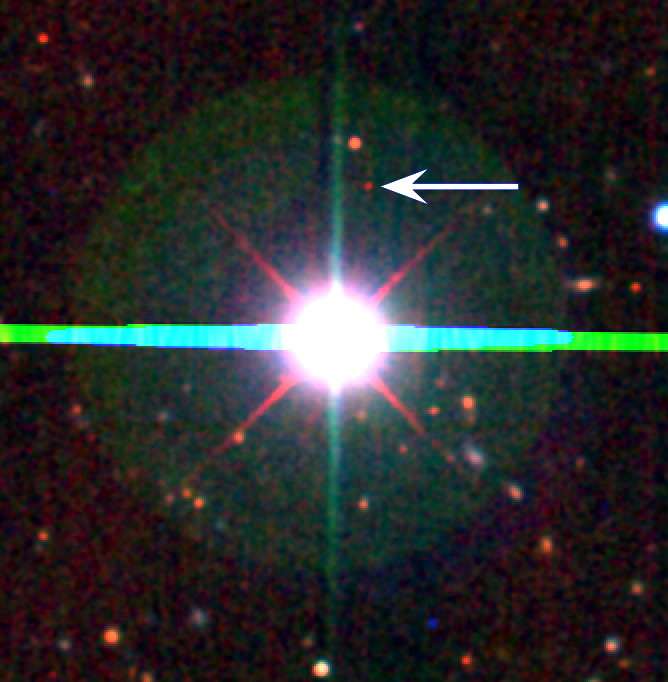
- 90Prime and DECam image of BD+60 1417 and the planet (red dot marked with a white arrow)

Discovery
- Discovery date: 2021
- Detection method: imaging method

Designations
- Alternative names: W1243, CWISER J124332.12+600126.2

Orbital characteristics
- Semi-major axis: 2094 AU (inclination correction of 1.26)

Physical characteristics
- Mean radius: 1.29±0.06 R_{J}
- Mass: 13.47±5.67 M_{J}
- Surface gravity: 4.26±0.20
- Temperature: 1240±81 K
- Spectral type: L8γ
- Apparent magnitude: PanSTARRS y 20.481±0.178

BD+60 1417b is a confirmed exoplanet discovered in 2021 using the imaging method. It is the only known exoplanet in the system BD+60 1417, around 45 parsecs from Earth. BD+60 1417 is a young K0 star, while BD+60 1417 b has a late-L spectral type. The planet might be the first discovery of a directly imaged exoplanet found by a citizen scientist. Discovery of exoplanets involving amateurs are usually transiting exoplanets and are rarely discovered with other methods. Another example of a non-transiting exoplanet discovery by an amateur is the microlensing exoplanet Kojima-1Lb.

== Discovery ==
Previous direct imaging planet-searching surveys with Gemini, Keck and Palomar failed to detect an exoplanet around BD+60 1417. A co-moving source around the star was first spotted with the WiseView Tool by the Backyard Worlds citizen scientist Jörg Schümann. WiseView uses data from the Wide-Field Infrared Survey Explorer (WISE). Additional observations with optical spectroscopy of the star at the Lick Observatory and infrared spectroscopy at NASA IRTF confirmed the presence of a young star with a planetary-mass companion around BD+60 1417.

BD+60 1417b is the second directly imaged exoplanet the WISE-telescope was able to discover, after COCONUTS-2b.

== Host star ==
The host star BD+60 1417 is a young K0 star with a mass of 1 M_{☉} and a radius of 0.797 ±0.051 R_{☉}. It has a brightness of 9.37 magnitude. The star shows typical signs of youth, such as x-ray detection with ROSAT and lithium absorption lines. Its age is estimated at 50-150 million years. The star rotates with a period of 7.50 ± 0.86 days, which is seen due to evolving starspots in the TESS light curve. The host star was observed with the Large Binocular Telescope PEPSI instrument in 2023. This constrained several chemical abundances of the star, such as [Fe/H] = 0.27 ± 0.03 dex, C/O = 0.23 ± 0.12 and Mg/Si = 1.41 ± 0.19.

BD+60 1417 is the only main sequence star with about one solar mass that is orbited by a planetary-mass object at a separation larger than 1,000 astronomical units. All other systems with a separation >1,000 au have a primary with <0.5 solar masses or are the stellar remnant WD0806.

== Physical properties ==
The infrared spectrum of the planet shows a red L8γ-type object with water vapor, carbon monoxide, iron(I) hydride and potassium iodide in its atmosphere. In the near-infrared it is one of the reddest substellar objects discovered to date with $J-Ks = 2.72$ mag. The spectrum of the exoplanet closely resembles objects with a suspected low surface gravity. A low surface gravity is a sign of youth for substellar objects. The researchers also found similarities with an archived SINFONI spectrum of the exoplanet 2M1207b and spectra of the HR 8799 exoplanets. The object was studied in 2024 and the team concluded that the model strongly favours a cloudy model over a cloudless model. Clouds of forsterite and enstatite should form on BD+60 1417b, if it has similar chemical abundances when compared to the host star. Quartz clouds should not form on this object. The researchers find that BD+60 1417b is spectroscopically very similar to WISEP J004701.06+680352.1, to the point that they call them spectroscopic twins.

== Orbit ==
The planet has an orbital period of about 95,000 years. BD+60 1417b has a large separation of 1662 astronomical units from its host star. If this exoplanet has formed in this wide orbit, it is likely to have formed similar to isolated brown dwarfs. It could also have formed in a closer orbit around the star via core accretion or disk instability and was later dynamically disturbed into a higher orbit, for example by a planet-planet fly-by.

== Status as an exoplanet ==
According to the NASA Exoplanet Archive, BD+60 1417b is an exoplanet, and it falls within their definition: An object with a minimum mass lower than 30 Jupiter masses and a not free-floating object with sufficient follow-up. The official working definition by the International Astronomical Union allows only exoplanets with a maximum mass of 13 Jupiter masses, and according to current knowledge, BD+60 1417b could be more massive than this limit.

== See also ==
- Backyard Worlds
- Planet Hunters
- HD 106906 b, another directly imaged planet that might have been scattered by a fly-by
