= SN 2024abfo =

Type-IIb supernova in the Horologium constellation

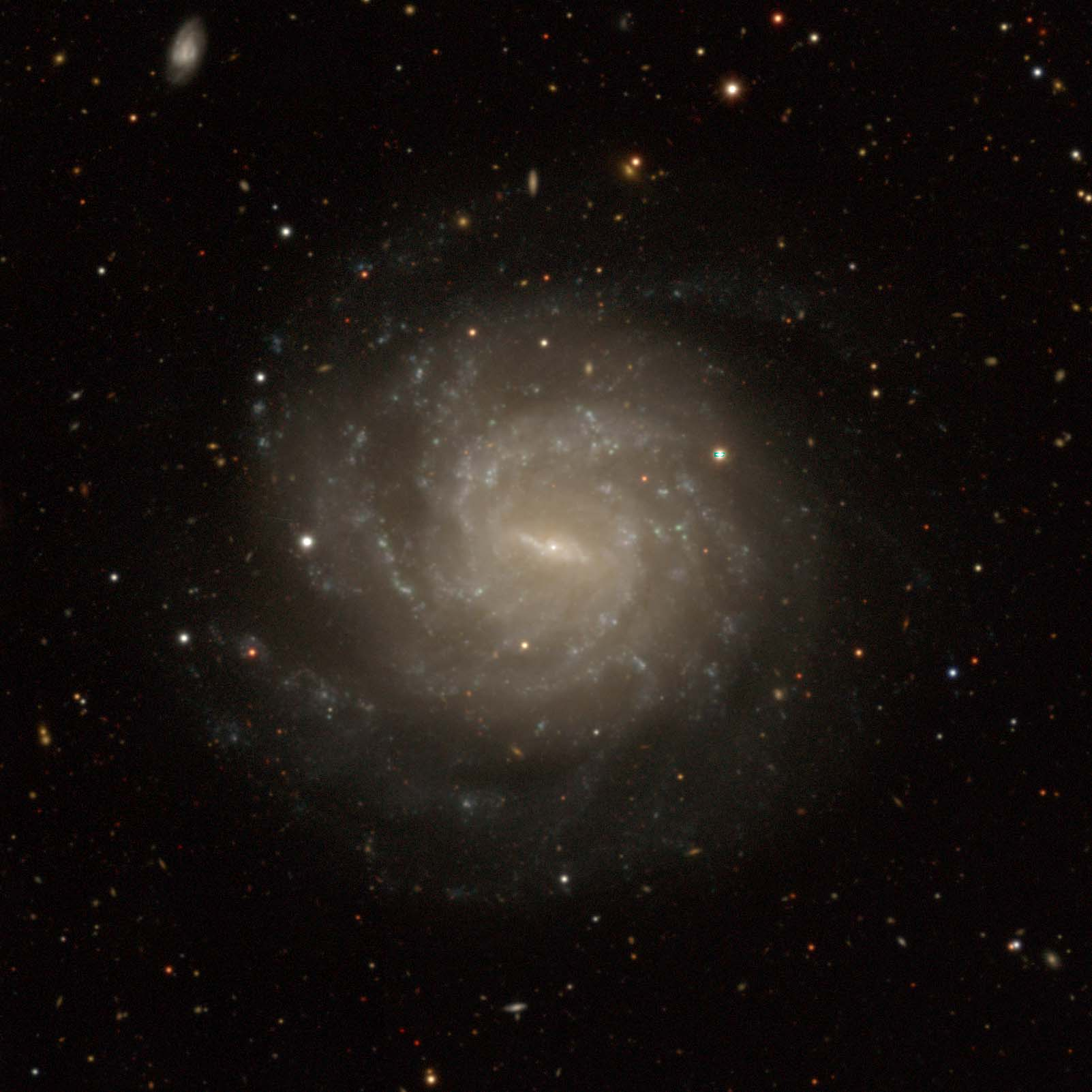
- Host galaxy NGC 1493 imaged by Legacy Surveys
- Event type: Supernova
- Type II supernova
- Date: 15, November 2024 (22:54:00.288)
- Instrument: Asteroid Terrestrial-impact Last Alert System (ATLAS)
- Constellation: Horologium
- Right ascension: 03^{h} 57^{m} 25.622^{s}
- Declination: −46° 11′ 07.67″
- Epoch: J2000
- Distance: 11 Mpc
- Host: NGC 1493
- Progenitor type: Yellow supergiant (probably binary system)
- Notable features: Relatively faint, Hydrogen-dominated
- Peak apparent magnitude: −16.5 ±0.1

SN 2024abfo was a Type-IIb supernova event that occurred in NGC 1493 around 11 Mpc from Earth in the Constellation of Horologium. The object was detected on the 15th of November, 2024 just a few hours after the explosion using the Asteroid Terrestrial-impact Last Alert System (ATLAS). The progenitor of the supernova was able to be identified through archival images taken by numerous telescopes and surveys such as the Hubble Space Telescope (HST), XMM-Newton space telescope and the Dark Energy Survey.

== Properties ==
The explosion was fairly faint for a Type-IIb supernova with its peak absolute magnitude being −16.5 ± 0.1 mag. It was also a relatively hydrogen rich supernova for its type. Currently, SN 2024abfo is the least luminous SN IIb with direct progenitor detections.

=== Spectra ===
The early spectra of SN 2024abfo was dominated by Balmer lines that have broad P Cygni profiles. This shows that the ejecta produced was traveling at a velocity of 22,500 km/s. Around a month after the explosion, spectra show that it was going through a transition towards being helium-dominated with the hydrogen lines not completely disappearing. Its fading was slow and linear, lasting for around 2 months. Similar to SN 2008ax, it does not show a prominent double-peaked light curve.

=== Progenitor ===
Single star models of the progenitor of SN 2024abfo show that the progenitor likely would have been a hot yellow supergiant star with a mass of around 11-15 solar masses. The most probable model for the progenitor of the supernova is the binary model. This model predicts that the progenitor was a 12 solar mass star in a binary system with a 1.2 solar mass companion. They would have had an orbital period of around 1.73 years.
