= CWISE J1249+3621 =

Low-mass hypervelocity star

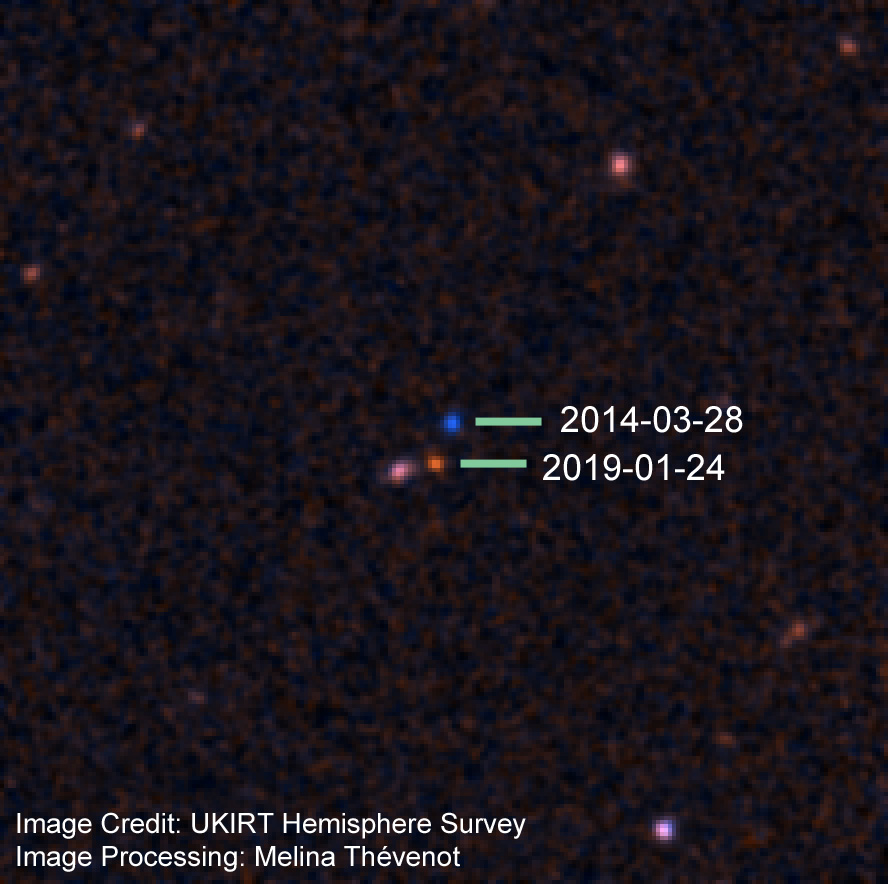
- UKIRT Hemisphere Survey image, showing the motion of CWISE J1249+362

Observation data Epoch J2000 Equinox J2000
- Constellation: Canes Venatici
- Right ascension: 12^{h} 49^{m} 09.04^{s}
- Declination: +36° 21′ 19.8″

Characteristics
- Evolutionary stage: subdwarf
- Spectral type: sdL1
- Apparent magnitude (i): 21.48±0.15
- Apparent magnitude (z): 20.01±0.06
- Apparent magnitude (y): 19.13±0.05

Astrometry
Radial velocity (R_{v})	−103±10 km/s
Total velocity	456±27 km/s
Proper motion (μ)	RA: 344±5 mas/yr Dec.: −814±5 mas/yr
Distance	408±26 ly (125±8 pc)

Details
Mass	0.082+0.002 −0.003 M_{☉}
Surface gravity (log g)	4.4 to 5.1 cgs
Temperature	1715 to 2320 K
Metallicity	−1.4 to −0.5
Age	≥5 Gyr

Other designations
- WISEA J124908.94+362121.8, CWISE J124909.08+362116.0

Database references
SIMBAD	data

CWISE J1249+362 (CWISE J124909.08+362116.0) is a low-mass hypervelocity star about 408 light-years distant from earth in the constellation Canes Venatici. It has an L spectral type and is either a low-mass red dwarf or a high-mass brown dwarf. It has a speed of approximately 450 kilometres per second (280 miles per second) in the galactic rest frame. That speed is near the local escape velocity of the Milky Way.

== Background and discovery ==
CWISE is an abbreviation of Citizen science Wide-field Infrared Survey Explorer.

CWISE J1249+362 was first identified in the Backyard Worlds project by the citizen scientists Tom Bickle, Martin Kabatnik, and Austin Rothermich (now astronomer). The scientists noticed the object because its motion and distance suggested a high velocity. They used the Near-Infrared Echellette Spectrometer (NIRES) at the Keck Observatory to take a spectrum of the object. They also identified the esdL1 dwarf ULAS J231949.36+044559.5 as an additional candidate hypervelocity star (v_{tan}≈513 km/s) with a low mass.

== Physical properties and origin ==
The object has a distance of 125±8 parsecs from the sun and its spectrum is sdL1, with sd noting that it is a cool subdwarf. The star has a high tangential velocity of 524±33 km/s and a high radial velocity of −103±10 km/s. In the galactic rest frame this translates into a speed of 456±27 km/s. It has an estimated mass between 83 and 88 M_{J}, which would make it a low-mass star near the hydrogen-burning limit. The researchers say that the object does have a 10% probability to be a high-mass brown dwarf because the evolutionary model does not account for potential systematic biases for old low-temperature sources.

The researchers explored different scenarios which could have caused the high velocity of CWISE J1249+362. One possibility is that it originates from the Galactic Center. The object is currently moving towards the Galactic Center, so it could be on its return pass. This is however only possible if it is bound to the Milky Way. Another possibility is that it was ejected during a type Ia supernova. In this scenario CWISE J1249+362 would have been in a tight binary with a massive white dwarf, which would have involved mass transfer in a cataclysmic variable star. The predicted ejection speed for this scenario agrees with the speed of CWISE J1249+362. Two other possibilities are that it originates from a dynamical ejection from a globular cluster or ejection from a nearby dwarf galaxy. There are however no globular clusters in the past position of this object. It is unlikely that CWISE J1249+362 is an extragalactic star, because its motion is confined within the galactic plane, which makes an origin within the Milky Way more likely.

More research that involves a direct measurement of its parallax and additional optical and infrared spectra are needed to narrow down its origin. If it originated in a type Ia supernova, its atmosphere could for example be enriched in heavy elements, particularly in nickel.
