= NGC 1483 =

Galaxy in the constellation Horologium

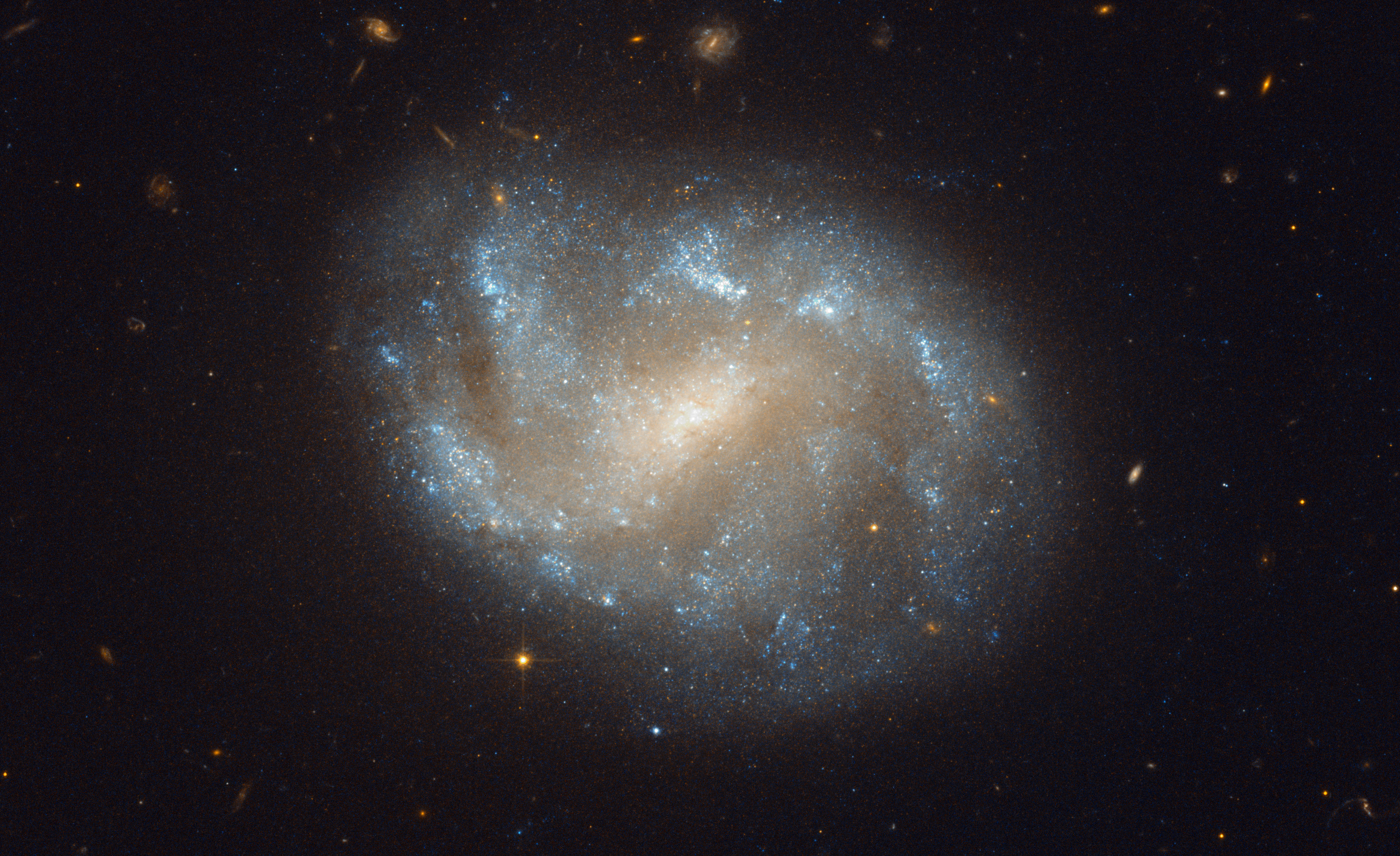
- Hubble Space Telescope image of the galaxy NGC 1483

Observation data (J2000 epoch)
- Constellation: Horologium
- Right ascension: 03^{h} 52^{m} 47.608^{s}
- Declination: −47° 28′ 39.06″
- Redshift: 0.004
- Heliocentric radial velocity: 1197 km/s
- Distance: 40 million light years
- Magnitude (J): 11.261
- Magnitude (H): 10.598
- Magnitude (K): 10.585

Characteristics
- Type: Sbc D

Other designations
- ESO 201-7, 2MASX J03524760-4728390, SINGG HIPASS J0352-47, APMBGC 201+078-132, HIPASS J0352-47, PSCz Q03512-4737, [CHM2007] HDC 257 J035247.60-4728390, 6dFGS gJ035247.6-472839, IRAS 03512-4737, QDOT B0351155-473726, [CHM2007] LDC 266 J035247.60-4728390, ESO-LV 201-0070, LEDA 14022, SGC 035116-4737.5
- References: 2006AJ....131.1163S, 2004ApJ...616..707H

NGC 1483 is a barred spiral galaxy located in the southern constellation of Horologium and member of the Dorado Group. The nebulous galaxy features a bright central bulge and diffuse arms with distinct star-forming regions.

NGC 1483 is part of a galaxy group known as NGC 1493 group (also known as LGG 106). This group contains 6 galaxies, including IC 2000 (galaxy), NGC 1493, NGC 1494, PGC 13979, and PGC 14125.
