= HD 165189 and HD 165190 =

Star in the constellation Corona Australis

Observation data Epoch J2000 Equinox ICRS
- Constellation: Corona Australis
- HD 165189
- Right ascension: 18^{h} 06^{m} 49.89293^{s}
- Declination: −43° 25′ 30.8009″
- Apparent magnitude (V): 5.62±0.01
- HD 165190
- Right ascension: 18^{h} 06^{m} 49.91494^{s}
- Declination: −43° 25′ 29.0976″
- Apparent magnitude (V): 5.68±0.01

Characteristics

HD 165189
- Evolutionary stage: main sequence
- Spectral type: A6 V
- B−V color index: +0.230

HD 165190
- Evolutionary stage: main sequence
- Spectral type: A7 V
- B−V color index: +0.262

Astrometry
Radial velocity (R_{v})	−7.8±0.4 km/s
Absolute magnitude (M_{V})	+1.81

HD 165189
Proper motion (μ)	RA: +10.915 mas/yr Dec.: −105.835 mas/yr
Parallax (π)	22.7417±0.1025 mas
Distance	143.4 ± 0.6 ly (44.0 ± 0.2 pc)

HD 165190
Proper motion (μ)	RA: −1.187 mas/yr Dec.: −101.243 mas/yr
Parallax (π)	22.6753±0.071 mas
Distance	143.8 ± 0.5 ly (44.1 ± 0.1 pc)

Orbit
Period (P)	607±245 yr
Semi-major axis (a)	4.63±1.83″
Eccentricity (e)	0.896±0.068
Inclination (i)	104±6°
Longitude of the node (Ω)	84.2±5.5°
Periastron epoch (T)	1854.7
Argument of periastron (ω) (secondary)	282±9°

Details

HD 165189
Mass	1.59 M_{☉}
Radius	1.7 R_{☉}
Luminosity	8.6 L_{☉}
Surface gravity (log g)	4.25 cgs
Temperature	7,600 K
Metallicity [Fe/H]	−0.25 dex
Rotational velocity (v sin i)	130±1 km/s

HD 165190
Mass	1.58 M_{☉}
Radius	1.7 R_{☉}
Luminosity	8.2 L_{☉}
Surface gravity (log g)	4.15 cgs
Temperature	7,566 K
Metallicity [Fe/H]	−0.24 dex
Rotational velocity (v sin i)	129±1 km/s
Age	813 Myr

Other designations
- 1 G. Coroane Australis, CD−43°12272, GC 24649, HIP 88726, CCDM J18068-4325, WDS J18068-4325
- HD 165189: HR 6749
- HD 165190: HR 6750

Database references
SIMBAD	data
- HD 165189
- HD 165190

HD 165189 and HD 165190 are components of a visual binary star system located 143 light years away in the southern constellation of Corona Australis. It is visible to the naked eye with the primary having an apparent visual magnitude of 4.929±0.025. The system is a member of the Beta Pictoris Moving Group.

The pair orbit each other with a period of 450 years and a large eccentricity of 0.650. They have a projected separation of 70.1 AU. Both components are A-type main-sequence stars; the primary has a stellar classification of A6 V while the secondary is A7 V. They have similar masses of 1.59 and 1.58 times the mass of the Sun, respectively.
