= HD 146624 =

Star in the southern zodiac constellation of Scorpius

- Location of HD 146624 (circled in red)

Observation data Epoch J2000 Equinox ICRS
- Constellation: Scorpius
- Right ascension: 16^{h} 18^{m} 17.89900^{s}
- Declination: −28° 36′ 50.4721″
- Apparent magnitude (V): 4.80

Characteristics
- Evolutionary stage: main sequence
- Spectral type: A0 V
- B−V color index: +0.008±0.018

Astrometry
Radial velocity (R_{v})	−13.0±0.8 km/s
Proper motion (μ)	RA: −31.971 mas/yr Dec.: −101.295 mas/yr
Parallax (π)	23.0018±0.3267 mas
Distance	142 ± 2 ly (43.5 ± 0.6 pc)
Absolute magnitude (M_{V})	1.14

Details
Mass	1.49 or 2.13±0.02 M_{☉}
Radius	1.60 R_{☉}
Luminosity	21.46+0.53 −0.51 L_{☉}
Surface gravity (log g)	3.99±0.13 cgs
Temperature	9,441+109 −108 K
Metallicity [Fe/H]	−0.27±0.12 dex
Rotational velocity (v sin i)	39 km/s
Age	10 Myr

Other designations
- d Sco, CD−28°12037, FK5 3288, HD 146624, HIP 79881, HR 6070, SAO 184301

Database references
SIMBAD	data

HD 146624 (d Scorpii) is a single, white-hued star in the southern zodiac constellation of Scorpius. It is faintly visible to the naked eye, having an apparent visual magnitude of 4.80. The distance to HD 146624 can be estimated from its annual parallax shift of 23.0 mas, yielding a separation of 142 light years. At that distance, the visual magnitude is reduced by an extinction of 0.17 due to interstellar dust. It is a member of the Beta Pictoris moving group, a set of ~12 million year old stars that share a common motion through space.

This is an A-type main-sequence star with a stellar classification of A0 V, and is suspected to be chemically peculiar. It is a young star, just 10 million years old, with a projected rotational velocity of 39 km/s. The mass of the star is greater than the Sun's, with De Rosa et al. (2014) estimating 1.49 times the mass of the Sun, while Zorec and Royer (2012) gives a multiplier of 2.13±0.02. It has 1.60 times the Sun's radius and shines with 21 times the Sun's luminosity from its photosphere at an effective temperature of 9,441 K.

The star displays an infrared excess, suggesting a circumstellar disk of orbiting material. This has a mean temperature of 280 K, matching a disk radius of 4.20 AU.
