= Kojima-1Lb =

Neptune-like exoplanet

Discovery
- Discovered by: Tadashi Kojima
- Discovery date: 2018
- Detection method: microlensing method

Designations
- Alternative names: TCP J050742+244755 b

Orbital characteristics
- Semi-major axis: 1.08+0.62 −0.18 AU

Physical characteristics
- Mass: 20±2 M_{🜨}

Kojima-1Lb (TCP J050742+244755 b) is an exoplanet discovered through the microlensing method. The host star lens was discovered by the amateur astronomer Tadashi Kojima (小嶋正). At the time of its discovery it was the planet around the brightest microlensing host star and consequently around a nearby star, as opposed to most of the microlensing planets, which are usually found around distant and inaccessible host stars. Kojima-1Lb is a mildly cold Neptune around a red dwarf located 429±21 pc from the Solar System.

== Naming ==
The microlensing event was first reported on CBAT as TCP J05074264+2447555 by Kojima. Conventionally microlensing planets are named after the discoverer of the microlensing event and not after the discoverer of the planetary feature. The discovery group of the planetary feature nicknamed the microlensing event Feynman-01 in honour of the Osservatorio Astroficico R.P. Feynman that discovered the planetary feature. The star now appears as Kojima-1 in SIMBAD.

== Discovery ==
The microlensing event caused by the star Kojima-1L moving in front of a background star was first observed by Tadashi Kojima from Gunma prefecture in Japan with a Canon EOS 6D + 135 mm f3.2 lens on 2 and 25 October 2017. ASASSN confirmed it as a microlensing event, but described it as a single-lens event. Nucita et al. 2017 used the photometry by AAVSO and the R.P. Feynman Observatory to first establish that TCP J05074264+2447555 was a binary lens with a hint to a new planetary system. Nucita et al. 2018 finally announced the discovery of the planet.

== Lensed background star ==
The lensed background star is a single late F-type main-sequence star with a temperature of about 6,400 K and a radius of 1.49±0.25 R_{☉}. The lensed background star is about 800 parsecs distant from earth.

== Lensing system ==
=== The star ===
The star has a mass of about 0.5 M_{☉} and it has a proper motion of 25.55±0.36 mas/yr. It is the second-brightest microlensing host star with K_{s}=13.7 mag. The brightest microlensing host star is Gaia22dkvL with V≈14 as of September 2023. Together with Gaia22dkvL, Kojima-1L is located outside the bulge of the Milky Way, representing a small growing sample of microlensing planets discovered in less-crowded regions.

=== The planet ===
The planet has a mass of about 20 Earth masses and has a projected separation of 0.8 or 0.9 astronomical units from its host star. This translates into a semi-major axis of about 1.1 astronomical units, which was inside and near the ice line at the younger age of the system.

The planet might have first formed while the snow line was at a distance larger than the orbit of the planet. As the snow line decreased, it might have crossed the orbit of the planet at around 2.2 Myrs after the Kojima-1L system has formed. Circumstellar disks around low-mass stars have lifetime of a few tens of Myrs. During planet formation, the planet might have experienced a period of a gas-rich, but ice-poor environment, before it got more ice-rich in a following period. It is difficult to form planets as massive such as Kojima-1Lb if the ice-rich period was during a gas-poor period. It is more likely that some gas remained in the ice-rich period. This way Kojima-1Lb could have grown fast during the ice-rich period, by accreting solid material and then accreting the remaining gas.

=== Future observations ===
In the future it might be possible to observe the star causing the lens. With current adaptive optics instruments it is predicted that the background star and the star causing the lens can be resolved in 2021. This will enable an independent characterization of the host star by taking a spectrum. VLT/Espresso might even be able to detect the 1.3-year orbital period planet Kojima-1Lb with the radial velocity method. A follow-up with for example Subaru/IRD might even be able to detect additional inner and/or massive planets around Kojima-1L
