= HP Draconis =

Binary star in the constellation Draco

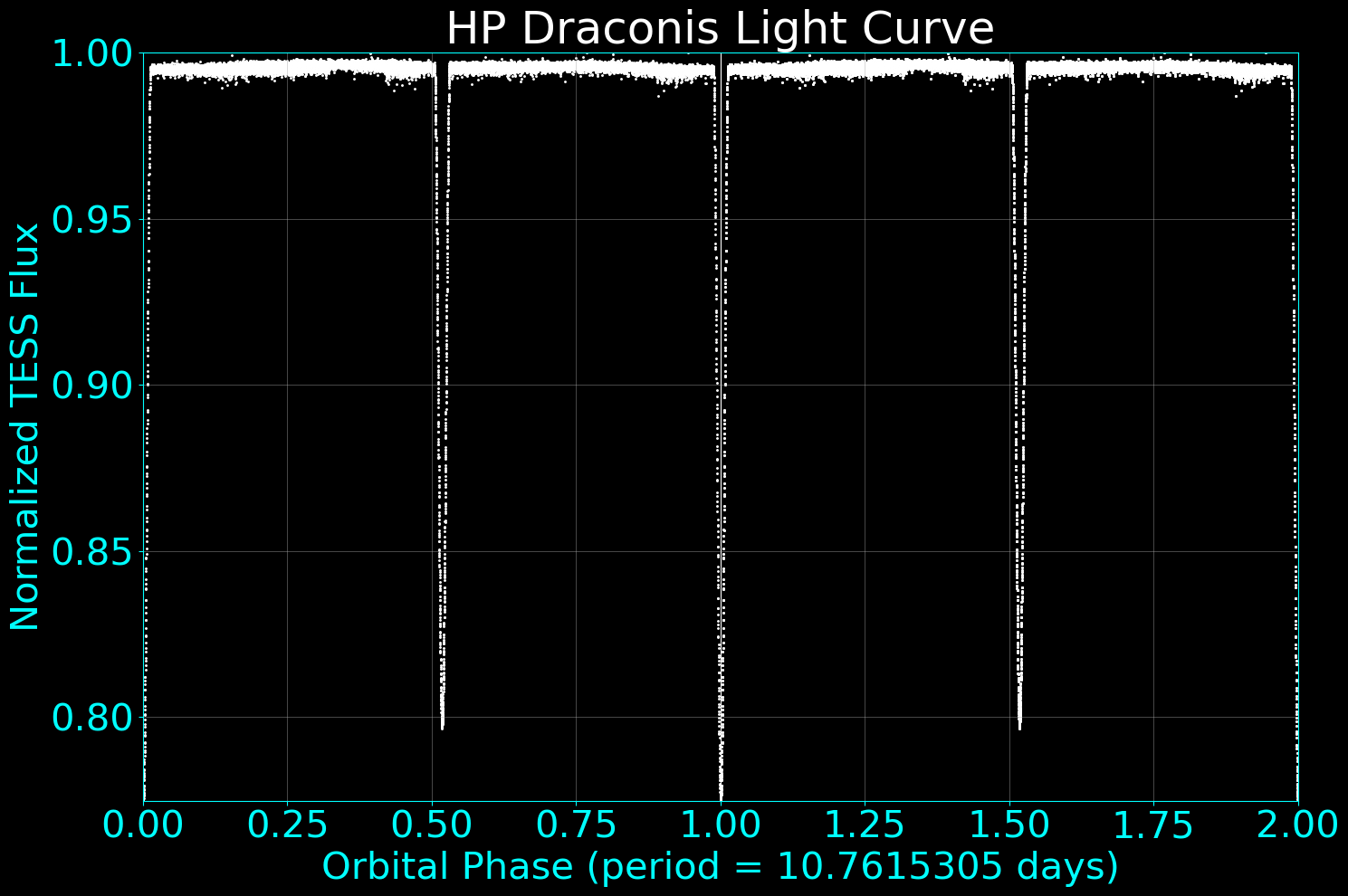
- Light curve for HP Draconis, plotted from TESS data.

Observation data Epoch J2000 Equinox J2000
- Constellation: Draco
- Right ascension: 18^{h} 54^{m} 53.4810^{s}
- Declination: +51° 18′ 29.792″
- Apparent magnitude (V): 7.974 (8.234 (primary eclipse), 8.204 (secondary eclipse))

Characteristics
- Evolutionary stage: Main sequence + main sequence
- Spectral type: F9V + F9V
- Variable type: Eclipsing binary

Astrometry
Radial velocity (R_{v})	−16.07±0.63 km/s
Proper motion (μ)	RA: +23.234 mas/yr Dec.: +83.306 mas/yr
Parallax (π)	12.6153±0.0516 mas
Distance	259 ± 1 ly (79.3 ± 0.3 pc)
Absolute magnitude (M_{V})	3.46±0.08

Orbit
Period (P)	10.76154±0.00009 days
Semi-major axis (a)	26.814±0.017 R_{☉}
Eccentricity (e)	0.03647±0.00011
Inclination (i)	87.5554±0.0060°
Argument of periastron (ω) (primary)	41.38±0.19°
Semi-amplitude (K_{1}) (primary)	61.971±0.056 km/s
Semi-amplitude (K_{2}) (secondary)	64.067±0.060 km/s

Details

HP Draconis A
Mass	1.1354±0.0023 M_{☉}
Radius	1.2474±0.0046 R_{☉}
Luminosity	1.82+0.19 −0.17 L_{☉}
Surface gravity (log g)	4.3012±0.0032 cgs
Temperature	6,000±150 K
Rotational velocity (v sin i)	5.864±0.021 km/s
Age	3.5 Gyr

HP Draconis B
Mass	1.0984±0.0022 M_{☉}
Radius	1.1498±0.0049 R_{☉}
Luminosity	1.48+0.12 −0.11 L_{☉}
Surface gravity (log g)	4.3376±0.0037 cgs
Temperature	5,935±150 K
Rotational velocity (v sin i)	5.406±0.023 km/s
Age	3.5 Gyr

Other designations
- BD+51°2459, HD 175900, HIP 92835, TYC 3552-394-1

Database references
SIMBAD	data

HP Draconis is a binary star system in the constellation of Draco. At an apparent magnitude of +7.974, it is not visible to the naked eye. Parallax measurements give a distance of 259 light-years (79 parsecs).

== Characteristics ==
This is an eclipsing binary system whose components are detached. Each 10.76 days (the orbital period of the system), the apparent magnitude of the system drops to 0.26 in the primary (deeper) eclipse and to 0.23 in the secondary eclipse. The variability of this system was discovered in 1997 by the Hipparcos satellite, and it was given its variable-star designation HP Draconis in 1999.

The components of this binary system are separated by 26.814 solar radii (18,654,000 km; 0.12470 au) with an eccentricity of 0.036. Both are F-type main-sequence stars with identical stellar classifications of F9V. Star A has 1.135 times the mass, 1.247 times the radius, and 1.8 times the luminosity of the Sun, while star B has 1.098 times the mass, 1.15 times the radius, and 1.48 times the Sun's luminosity. The effective temperatures are 6,000 and 5,935 K, giving them the yellow-white hue typical of late-type F-type stars. The estimated age of the system is 3.5 billion years. There is evidence of a third component in the system from eclipse timing variations.

HP Draconis makes a wide triple system with a white dwarf that has a projected separation of 1,140 astronomical units, giving an estimated orbital period of 23,000 years. This companion has 0.45 times the Sun's mass, a temperature of 7,087±205 K and has been a white dwarf for an estimated 1.15 billion years.
