= Planetary-mass object =

Size-based definition of celestial objects

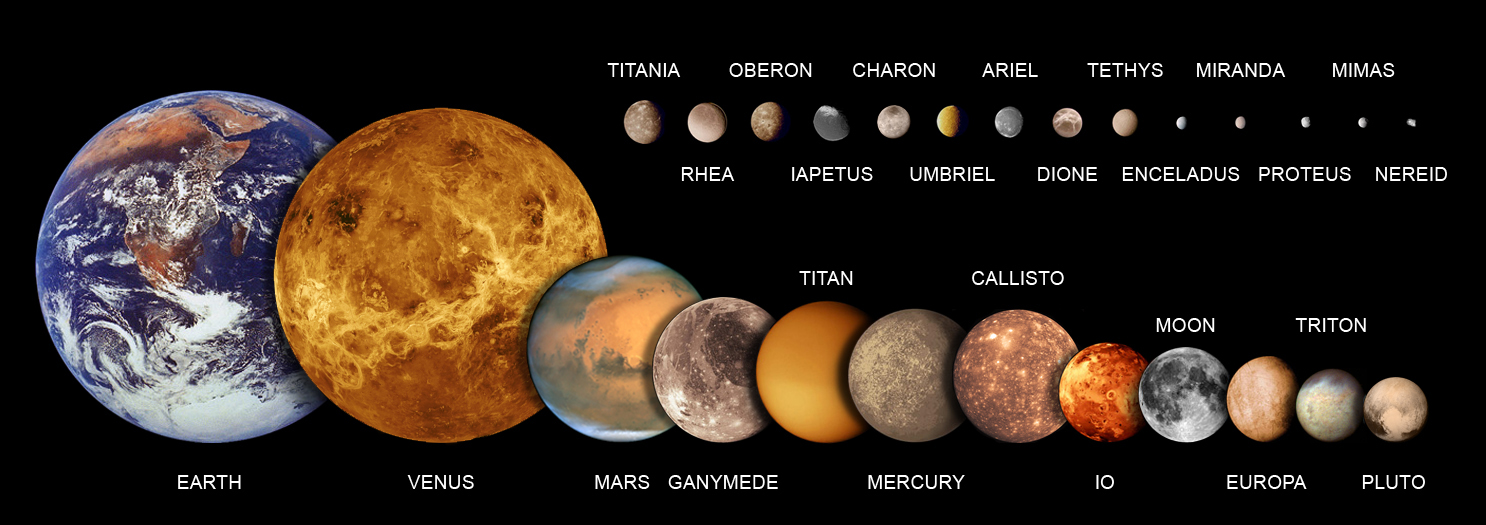
The planetary-mass moons to scale, compared with Mercury, Venus, Earth, Mars, and Pluto (the other planetary-mass objects beyond Neptune have never been imaged up close). Borderline Proteus and Nereid (about the same size as round Mimas) have been included. Unimaged Dysnomia (intermediate in size between Tethys and Enceladus) is not shown; it is in any case probably not a solid body.

A planetary-mass object (PMO), planemo, or planetary body (sometimes referred to as a world) is, by geophysical definition of celestial objects, any celestial object massive enough to achieve hydrostatic equilibrium and assume an ellipsoid shape, but not enough to sustain core fusion like a star.

The purpose of this term is to classify together a broader range of celestial objects than just "planet", since many objects similar in geophysical terms do not conform to conventional astrodynamic expectations for a planet. Planetary-mass objects can be quite diverse in origin and location, and include planets, dwarf planets, planetary-mass moons and free-floating planets, which may have been ejected from a system (rogue planets) or formed through cloud-collapse rather than accretion (sub-brown dwarfs).

== Usage in astronomy ==
While the term technically includes exoplanets and other objects, it is often used for objects with an uncertain nature or objects that do not fit in one specific class. Cases in which the term is often used:

- isolated planetary-mass objects (iPMO; IPMO) are objects that are free-floating and have a low mass below deuterium burning and their nature as either an ejected free-floating planets or sub-brown dwarfs is not fully resolved (e.g. 2MASS J13243553+6358281, PSO J060.3200+25.9644 objects in NGC 1333)
- Objects with a mass range at the border of deuterium burning (VHS 1256-1257 b, BD+60 1417b)
- Objects that orbit a star or brown dwarf, but their formation as exoplanets is challenging or impossible (VHS 1256-1257 b, CFHTWIR-Oph 98B)

== Types ==
=== Planetary-mass satellite ===
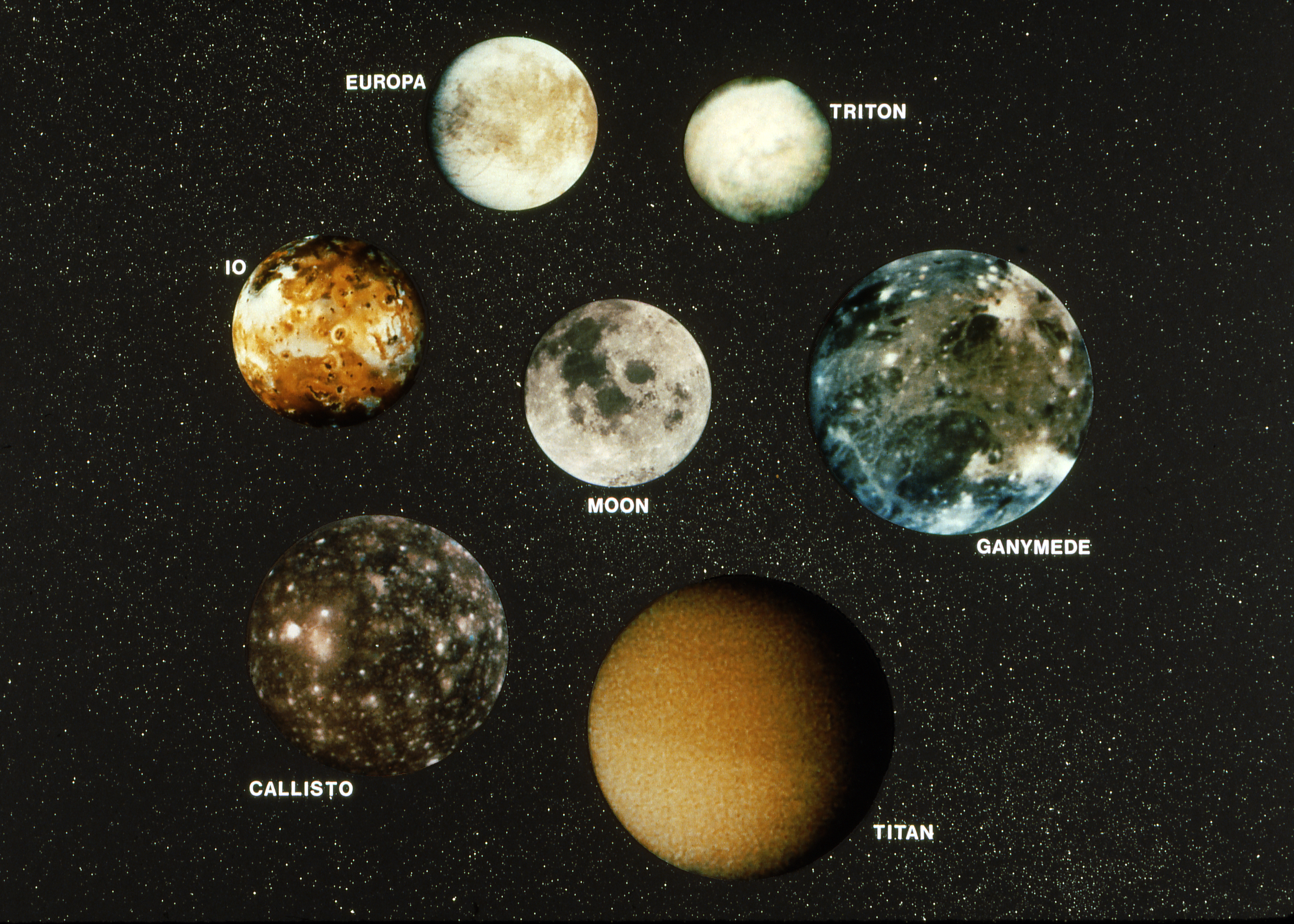
Planetary-mass satellites larger than Pluto, the largest Solar dwarf planet.

The three largest satellites Ganymede, Titan, and Callisto are of similar size or larger than the planet Mercury; these and four more – Io, the Moon, Europa, and Triton – are larger and more massive than the largest and most massive dwarf planets, Pluto and Eris. Another dozen smaller satellites are large enough to have become round at some point in their history through their own gravity, tidal heating from their parent planets, or both. In particular, Titan has a thick atmosphere and stable bodies of liquid on its surface, like Earth (though for Titan the liquid is methane rather than water). Proponents of the geophysical definition of planets argue that location should not matter and that only geophysical attributes should be taken into account in the definition of a planet. The term satellite planet is sometimes used for planet-sized satellites.

=== Dwarf planets ===
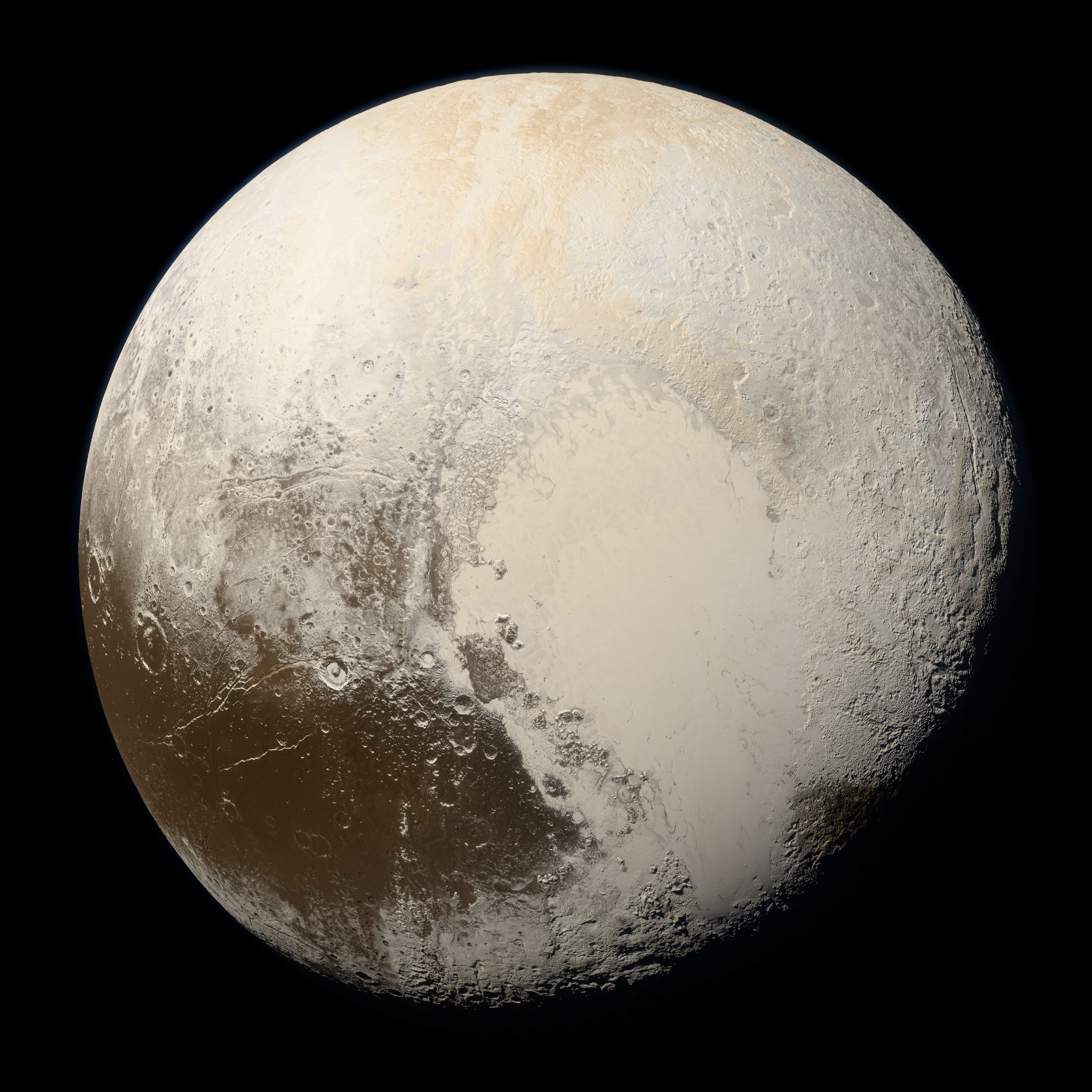
The dwarf planet Pluto

A dwarf planet is a planetary-mass object that is neither a true planet nor a natural satellite; it is in direct orbit of a star, and is massive enough for its gravity to compress it into a hydrostatically equilibrious shape (usually a spheroid), but has not cleared the neighborhood of other material around its orbit. Planetary scientist and New Horizons principal investigator Alan Stern, who proposed the term 'dwarf planet', has argued that location should not matter and that only geophysical attributes should be taken into account, and that dwarf planets are thus a subtype of planet. The International Astronomical Union (IAU) accepted the term (rather than the more neutral 'planetoid') but decided to classify dwarf planets as a separate category of object.

=== Planets and exoplanets ===
A planet is a large, rounded astronomical body that is generally required to be in orbit around a star, stellar remnant, or brown dwarf, and is not one itself. The Solar System has eight planets by the most restrictive definition of the term: the terrestrial planets Mercury, Venus, Earth, and Mars, and the giant planets Jupiter, Saturn, Uranus, and Neptune. The best available theory of planet formation is the nebular hypothesis, which posits that an interstellar cloud collapses out of a nebula to create a young protostar orbited by a protoplanetary disk. Planets grow in this disk by the gradual accumulation of material driven by gravity, a process called accretion.

=== Former stars ===
In close binary star systems, one of the stars can lose mass to a heavier companion. Accretion-powered pulsars may drive mass loss. The shrinking star can then become a planetary-mass object. An example is a Jupiter-mass object orbiting the pulsar PSR J1719−1438. These shrunken white dwarfs may become helium planets or carbon planets.

=== Sub-brown dwarfs ===
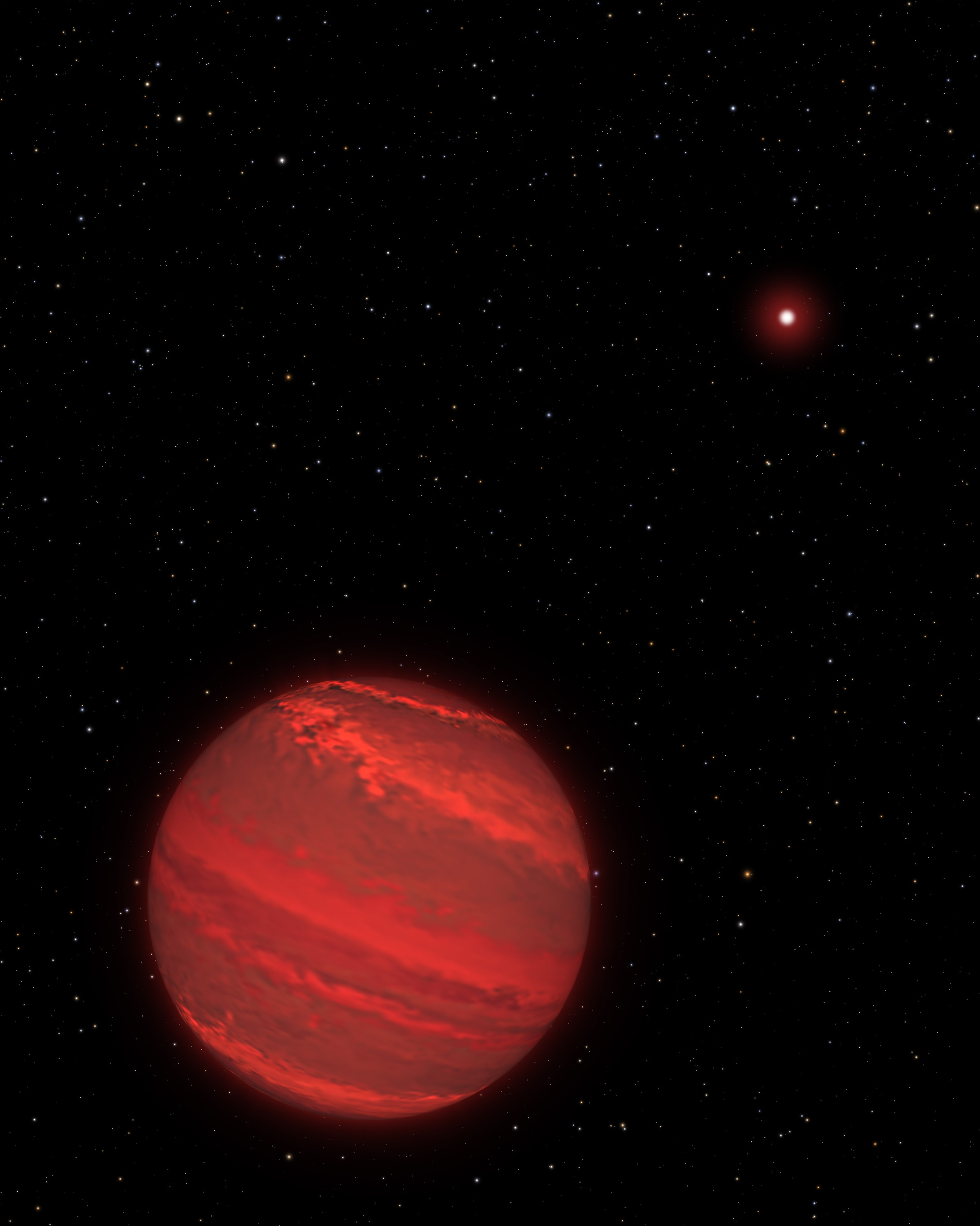
Artist's impression of a super-Jupiter around the brown dwarf 2M1207.

Stars form via the gravitational collapse of gas clouds, but smaller objects can also form via cloud collapse. Planetary-mass objects formed this way are sometimes called sub-brown dwarfs. Sub-brown dwarfs may be free-floating such as Cha 110913−773444 and OTS 44, or orbiting a larger object such as 2MASS J04414489+2301513.

Binary systems of sub-brown dwarfs are theoretically possible; Oph 162225-240515 was initially thought to be a binary system of a brown dwarf of 14 Jupiter masses and a sub-brown dwarf of 7 Jupiter masses, but further observations revised the estimated masses upwards to greater than 13 Jupiter masses, making them brown dwarfs according to the IAU working definitions.

=== Captured planets ===
Rogue planets in stellar clusters have similar velocities to the stars and so can be recaptured. They are typically captured into wide orbits between 100 and 10^{5} AU. The capture efficiency decreases with increasing cluster volume, and for a given cluster size it increases with the host/primary mass. It is almost independent of the planetary mass. Single and multiple planets could be captured into arbitrary unaligned orbits, non-coplanar with each other or with the stellar host spin, or pre-existing planetary system.

=== Rogue planets ===
Several computer simulations of stellar and planetary system formation have suggested that some objects of planetary mass would be ejected into interstellar space. Such objects are typically called rogue planets.

== See also ==
- Planetary mass
- List of gravitationally rounded objects of the Solar System
- List of Solar System objects by size
