= Beta Pictoris moving group =

Moving group of stars

β Pic moving group
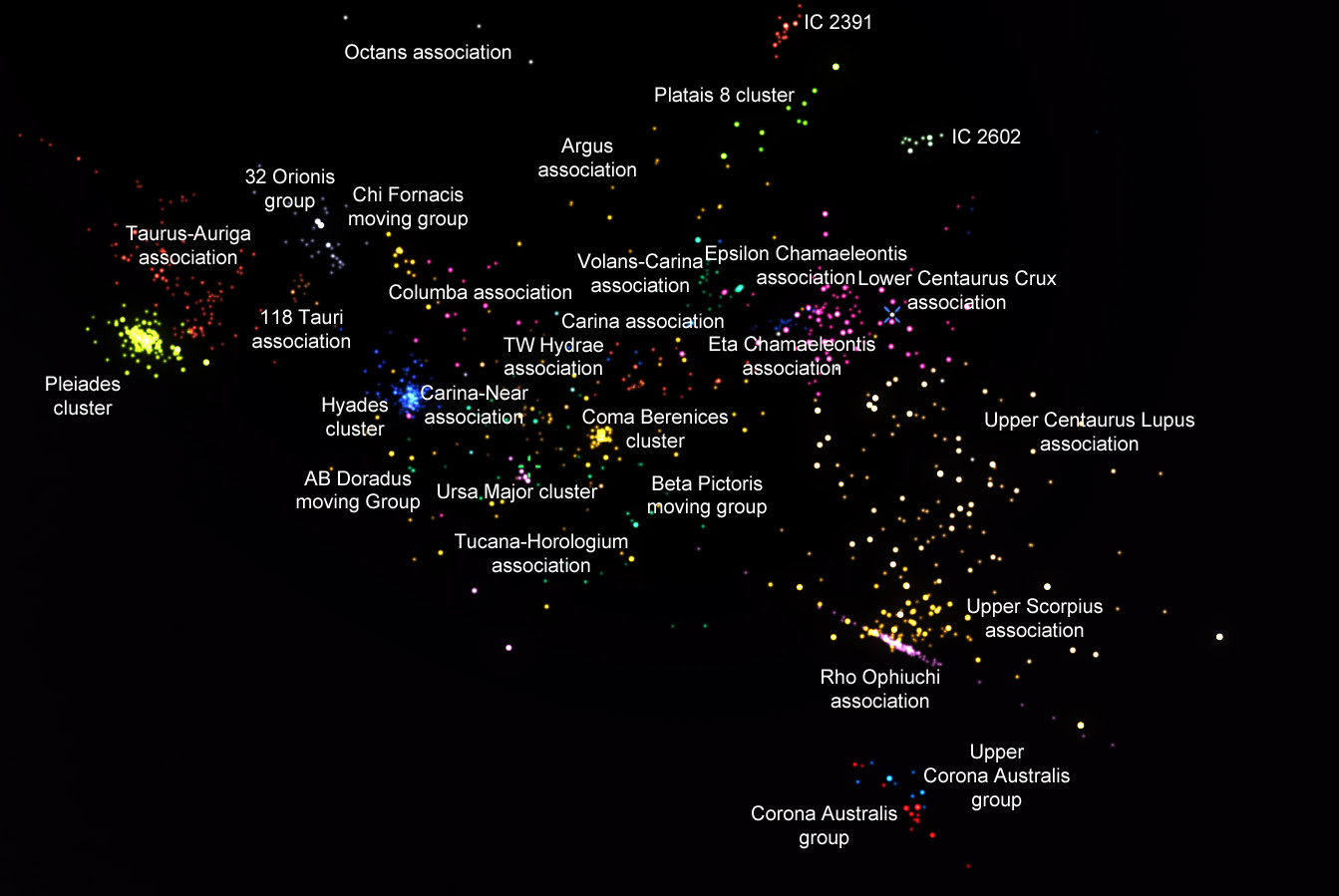
- Map of stellar associations and moving groups located close to Earth. The Beta Pic moving group is located towards the center of the image

Observation data
- Distance: 115 ly (35 pc)

Physical characteristics
- Estimated age: 20–26 Ma

Associations

The Beta Pictoris moving group is a young moving group of stars located relatively near Earth. A moving group, in astronomy, is a group of stars that share a common motion through space as well as a common origin. This moving group is named for Beta Pictoris, an A-type main sequence star with a debris disk.

The Beta Pictoris moving group is an important object for astronomical study as it is the closest youthful group of stars to the Earth. The star Beta Pictoris is known to have a large disk of gas and dust, possibly a protoplanetary disk. There is also evidence of a young gas giant planet around the star. A free-floating planet has also been found in the moving group, PSO J318.5-22. It has recently been estimated, as of 17 October 2023, that more than a third of the single Sun-like stars in the group have planets with more than four times the mass of Jupiter, and virtually all of the single Sun-like stars, 99%, possess at least one gas giant in orbit around them. The age and distance of the group makes it a candidate for directly imaging extrasolar planets.

== Constituents ==
The Beta Pictoris moving group consists of 17 stellar systems, comprising a total of 28 individual component stars, including identified brown dwarfs. The core of the group is located some 115 light-years from Earth, and has an average estimated age of between 20 and 26 million years.

The majority of the group is made up of cool, dim K and M class stars. Most are not visible to the naked eye. The members that are visible to the naked eye are:

- Beta Pictoris
- Eta Telescopii
- 51 Eridani
- HD 203
- HD 146624
- HD 165189
- HD 172555
- Beta Trianguli Australis (potential member)

The group covers a region of space for the most part visible only in the Southern Hemisphere, as shown in the map below.

Locations of group members from Zuckerman et al.

== Discovery ==
An early estimated age for the star Beta Pictoris at about 10 million years proved problematic due to the star's apparent isolation in space. According to current theory regarding stellar evolution, extremely young stars of this age should be located near other young stars that formed from the same region in space. It is not until significantly later that gravitational interactions with other stars causes stellar 'siblings' to disperse.

In 1999 the situation was resolved by the discovery of a pair of dim red dwarf stars that were found to have a similar velocity and age to β Pictoris, lending credence to the estimated age of the star.

Further work published in 2001 identified a total of 17 stellar systems with a similar motion and age as the Beta Pictoris moving group, named for the primary member of the association.

== Origin ==
The movements of the group were tracked to the positions they occupied 11.5 Myr ago, where they occupied a space 3 times smaller than their current distribution (24 pc, versus 72 pc today) situated in between two regions of the Scorpius-Centaurus OB star group , and it was suggested that they originated there when a supernova from either OB region of Scorpius-Centaurus OB would have been close enough to trigger stellar formation.

== See also ==
- List of nearby stellar associations and moving groups
- AB Doradus moving group
- TW Hydrae association
