= L dwarf =

Astronomical objects colder than red dwarfs

An object with the spectral type L (also called L-dwarf) can be either a low-mass star, a brown dwarf or a young free-floating planetary-mass object. If a young exoplanet or planetary-mass companion is detected via direct imaging, it can also have an L spectral type, such as Kappa Andromedae b.

== Spectral characteristics ==
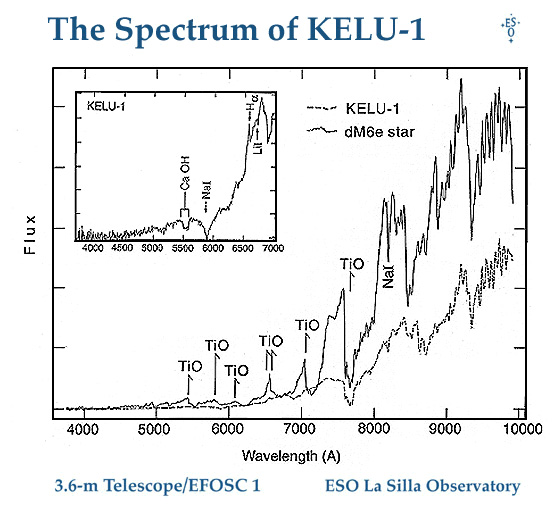
Spectrum of Kelu-1 (L-type binary, bottom line) in comparison to an M6-dwarf, which shows much stronger TiO and sodium absorption.

Properties of typical L-dwarfs
Spectral type	Radius (R_{☉})	Luminosity (L_{☉})	Effective temperature (K)
L0	0.102	2.5×10^{−4}	2,270
L1	0.0995	1.9×10^{−4}	2,160
L2	0.0970	1.5×10^{−4}	2,060
L3	0.0942	1.1×10^{−4}	1,920
L4	0.0940	9.8×10^{−5}	1,870
L5	0.0909	6.3×10^{−5}	1,710
L6	0.0891	4.2×10^{−5}	1,550
L7	0.0886	3.9×10^{−5}	1,530
L8	0.0875	2.8×10^{−5}	1,420
L9	0.0877	2.5×10^{−5}	1,370

Before 2MASS there were only six known objects with a spectral type later than M9.5V. With the discovery of 20 new late-type objects it was necessary to define the L-type and T-type spectral types, and this was done in 1999. In these L-dwarfs the metallic oxides (TiO, VO), which are present in late M-dwarfs, are replaced with metallic hydrides (e.g. CrH, FeH) and neutral alkali metals (e.g. K, Rb, Cs). The transition between L- and T-dwarfs is defined with the appearance of methane (CH_{4}) in the spectrum. M-dwarfs show absorption due to water vapor (H_{2}O) in their near-infrared spectrum. This absorption feature gets stronger with later L spectral type. The absorption due to carbon monoxide (CO) does show little variation over spectral type. CO is replaced by CH_{4} in T-dwarfs. Initially it was estimated that the hottest L0-dwarfs have a temperature of around 2000 K and the coldest L8-dwarfs have a temperature of about 1500 K. Modern estimates range from 1100 K for L9, to a maximum of 2500 K for L0.

L-dwarfs have a red, violet, or purple color due to absorption from the sodium D-line, which is centered at 5890 Å, overlapping with the color green. Later work described L-dwarfs as having a violet color.

=== Subdwarfs ===
Subdwarfs are objects with a low metallicity. These objects are usually old and their metallicity influences different absorption features. In particular, the collision induced absorption of hydrogen molecules leads to a suppression of the H- and K-band, which causes L-type subdwarfs to have blue near-infrared colors. 2MASS J0532+8246 was the first L-type subdwarf discovered. The prefix sd, esd and usd indicate subdwarfs, extreme subdwarfs and ultra subdwarfs. Objects with an usd-prefix have the lowest metallicity.

== Main-sequence stars ==
The hydrogen burning minimum mass lies at 0.075 M_{☉} (78.5 M_{J}) for objects with a solar metallicity. The table of ultracool fundamental parameters lists several objects with an infrared spectral type of L0 to L4 and a mass above 78.5 M_{J}. One of the highest mass L-dwarfs in this list is G 239-25B (L0) for which they find a mass of 88.9 ±0.59 M_{J}. The hydrogen burning-limit is dependent on metallicity and objects with a low metallicity can have a higher hydrogen burning limit. Another factor is that a lower metallicity causes the atmosphere to be more transparent. Therefore older objects have temperatures that are higher. Old L-subdwarfs with an early L spectral type can be main-sequence stars. The brown dwarf SDSS J0104+1535 (usdL1.5, 0.086 ± 0.0015 M_{☉}) for example is just below the hydrogen burning limit of around 0.088 M_{☉}, for its metallicity of [Fe/H] = -2.4 ± 0.2. The same team found that a third of known L-subdwarfs are substellar objects and two-thirds are low-mass stars. CWISE J1249+3621 (sdL1, 0.082+0.002
−0.003 M_{☉}) is for example a star, because the hydrogen burning limit is at around 0.080 for [M/H]=-1. This star is also a hypervelocity star.

== Brown dwarfs ==
Most L-dwarfs are brown dwarfs. Brown dwarfs are objects with a mass below 78.5 M_{J}. Objects with a mass below 14 M_{J} are often referred to as planetary-mass objects, but depending on their formation mechanism they are also called planetary-mass brown dwarfs.

In the table of ultracool fundamental parameters there are currently 422 objects with an infrared spectral type of L and a mass range of 14-78.5 M_{J}. Additionally there are dozens of L-type brown dwarfs known that co-move with a star, white dwarf or brown dwarf. The first L-type brown dwarf discovered was GD 165B, which orbits a white dwarf. Its mass was later determined to be 62.58 ± 15.57 M_{J}.

== Planetary-mass objects and exoplanets ==
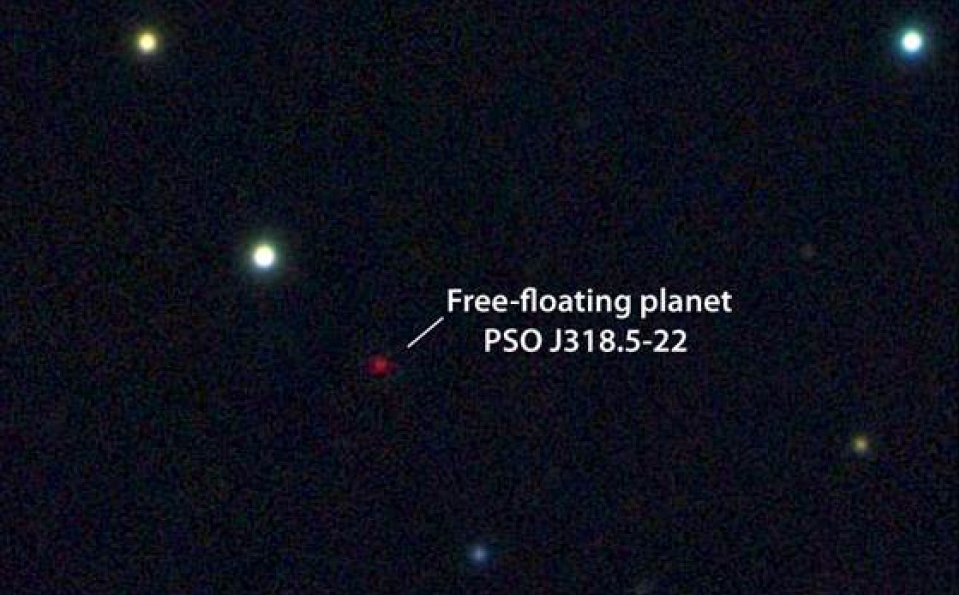
Free-floating planetary-mass object PSO J318.5−22, which is an L-dwarf

A planetary-mass object is commonly defined as an object with a mass below 14 M_{J}. These objects can be free-floating or co-move with a star or brown dwarf (e.g. HD 106906 b). If such an object orbits a star within about 100 AU, it is referred to as an exoplanet. Beyond 100 AU, it is referred to as a planetary-mass companion since theories predict that these objects form on their own and not from material of a protoplanetary disk. One exoplanet near this 100 AU boundary is Delorme 1 (AB)b, which could have formed via fragmentation of the circumstellar disk and is therefore considered an exoplanet. More close-in planets, such as the planets around HR 8799 and Kappa Andromedae b also resemble L-dwarfs or have an L spectral type.

These objects are usually identified by their young age. An object can for example be present in a young star cluster (e.g. NGC 1333) or a young association (see List of nearby associations). Researchers can use the temperature-age or luminosity-age relation to determine if its mass is below 13 M_{J}. For very young star clusters (<1 Myr) even an L0 spectral type corresponds to a planetary-mass and therefore all L-dwarfs in such a star cluster have a planetary-mass.

Another method is to determine other indicators of a young age. A lower-mass object has for example a lower surface gravity, which leads to a more extended atmosphere and more vertical mixing. This will affect the depth of certain spectral features and can lead to red near-infrared colors. A low-gravity L-dwarf is often denoted with the suffix β, γ and δ, indicating intermediate (β), low (γ) and very low (δ) gravity. Low-gravity L3-L5 dwarfs can also show lithium absorption. The so-called "lithium test" is less reliable to determine a low mass for young L-dwarfs. An example for a low gravity object is CWISE J0506+0738, which has a spectral type between L8γ and T0γ and probably a mass of 7±2 M_{J}.

== Variability and clouds ==
Iron clouds with silicate clouds on top of it were theorized since the early 2000s for L-dwarfs. The presence of silicates in L-dwarfs is well established with Spitzer observations. Especially L4-L6 dwarfs often show silicate absorption. But silicate absorption can also be absent for any L-dwarf. Variability is often connected to the presence of clouds in L- and T-dwarfs. There are however other possible explanations, such as hot spots, temperature variations and aurorae. Especially young objects show variability. One of the most variable L-dwarf is the planetary-mass companion VHS J1256–1257b (L7), with an amplitude of 33-38%.

== Magnetic field and aurorae ==
Radio emission can be detected in L-dwarfs and this radio emission sometimes shows rotational periodic radio pulses. Additionally the H-alpha emission seen commonly in L-dwarf is interpreted as chromospheric and coronal in early L-dwarfs, but with later spectral type it will become more and more an auroral feature. Therefore L4–T8 objects with H-alpha emission are often also radio sources. Radio pulses from brown dwarfs are highly circular polarized and likely come from electron cyclotron maser instability (ECMI), which is connected to aurorae. It is currently not known what powers auroral radio emission in brown dwarfs. One suggestion is the breakdown of the co-rotation with a plasma disk, which also powers the main aurora on Jupiter. The other suggested energy source is the interaction with a rocky planet around the brown dwarf, similar to the interaction between Io and Jupiter. Impacts of electrons with hydrogen molecules can create a trihydrogen cation (H^{+}_{3}). This could be detected in the infrared at 2 and 4 μm with JWST. Destruction of H^{+}_{3} by gases, such as H_{2}O and CH_{4}, could mean that it is not built up significantly in brown dwarfs. No H^{+}_{3} was detected in any M, L or T dwarf with the Keck Observatory, likely due to auroral electrons penetrating deeper into the brown dwarf atmospheres and being destroyed by gases. The first L-dwarf with radio emission was 2MASS J00361617+1821104 (L3.5).

== Binaries ==
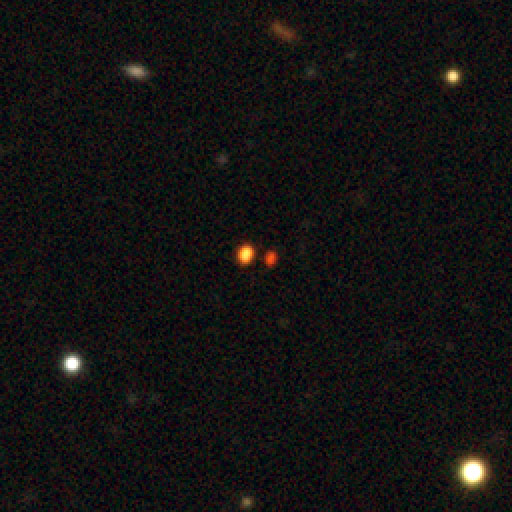
The L-type binary CWISE J0146-0508AB (L4+L8 blue)

L-dwarfs are less often binaries than M-dwarfs. Systems with an L-dwarf as a primary have a binary fraction of 24+6
−2% with a typical separation of 5–8 astronomical units (AU). There are also L-dwarfs with a wider separation, such as WISE 2150−7520 (L1+T8), which has a separation of 341 AU. The closest L-dwarf to the Solar System is the primary in the Luhman 16 AB binary. It has a spectral type of L8.

== See also ==
- List of brown dwarfs
