= H band (infrared) =

Atmospheric window

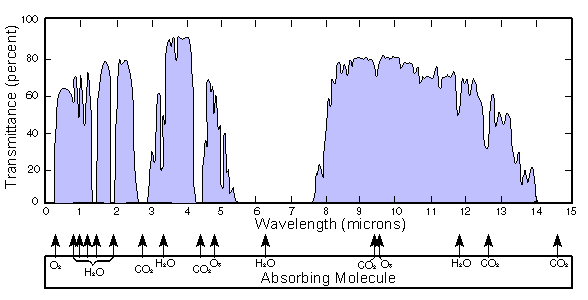
Atmospheric windows in the infrared. The H band is the transmission window centred on 1.65 micrometres

In infrared astronomy, the H band refers to an atmospheric transmission window centred on 1.65 micrometres with a Full width at half maximum of 0.35 micrometres (in the near-infrared).

Save for a limited amount of absorption by water vapor, Earth's atmosphere is highly translucent at the wavelengths covered by the H band. The window is also notably less likely to be contaminated by infrared excess than other bands.

The band is useful for a range of infrared observations including the imaging of sunspots, spectroscopic investigation of late-type stars, and imaging planetary phenomena such as extraterrestrial vortices or volcanic activity in the Solar System. In addition stellar atmospheres are highly transparent in the H band and stellar light in the window originates from deeper in the stellar atmosphere than any other band. It also includes within it access to several sets of spectral lines including for carbon monoxide and cyanide.
