= List of star systems within 80–85 light-years =

This is a list of star systems within 80–85 light years of Earth.

Most data from this list come from the SIMBAD database.

== List ==
Key
#	Visible to the unaided eye
$	Bright star (absolute magnitude of +8.5 or brighter)
‡	White dwarf
§	Brown dwarf or sub-brown dwarf
*	Nearest in constellation

System	Star or (sub-) brown dwarf	Distance (ly)	Constellation	Coordinates: RA, Dec (Ep J2000, Eq J2000)	Stellar class	Apparent magnitude (V)	Parallax (mas)	Notes and additional references
2MASS J03264225-2102057		80			L7			
PSO J318.5-22		80	Capricornus	21^{h} 14^{m} 08.0256^{s} −22° 51′ 35.838″	L7 VL-G			Rogue planet
Ross 686	A	80			M4V			
Ross 686	B	80			M4.5V			
HR 5566		80			G3-5V	6.347		
Gamma Ceti (Kaffaljidhma)	A$	80 ± 1	Cetus	02^{h} 43^{m} 18.03910^{s} +03° 14′ 08.9390″	A3 V	3.47#		
Gamma Ceti (Kaffaljidhma)	B	80 ± 1	Cetus	02^{h} 43^{m} 18.03910^{s} +03° 14′ 08.9390″	F3V			
Gamma Ceti (Kaffaljidhma)	C	80 ± 1	Cetus	02^{h} 43^{m} 18.03910^{s} +03° 14′ 08.9390″	K5			
LHS 1499		80.1			M4V			
LHS 231		80.1			M4.5V			
HD 12051		80.1			G5-7V	7.144		
HD 19394		80 ± 0.1			MV			has planet
HR 2290		80 ± 0.1	Puppis	06^{h} 20^{m} 06.13481^{s} −48° 44′ 27.9261″	G5-7V			
HD 54371		80.2			G8 V	7.062		
GJ 1150		80.3			M0Vp	9.534		
HD 96064		80.4			G5 V	7.64		
HD 20619		80.5			G0-1.5 V	7.039		
HD 113283		80.5			G5 V-III	7.143		
Megrez (Delta Ursae Majoris)$		80.5 ± 0.3	Ursa Major	12^{h} 15^{m} 25.56063^{s} +57° 01′ 57.4156″	A3 V	3.312#		
Delta Velorum (Alsephina)	A$	80.6 ± 0.8	Vela	08^{h} 44^{m} 42.226^{s} −54° 42′ 31.76″	A1Va(n)	1.95–2.43 + 5.5#		
Delta Velorum (Alsephina)	B	80.6 ± 0.8	Vela	08^{h} 44^{m} 42.226^{s} −54° 42′ 31.76″	F7.5V			
WD 1856+534		80.64 ± 0.14	Draco	18^{h} 57^{m} 39.344^{s} +53° 30′ 33.30″	DC	17.244		Has one known exoplanet and makes a triple system together with G 229-20 (see below)
GJ 4138		80.7 ± 13			G8-K1 V	7.96		
G 229-20	A	80.8	Draco	A: 18^{h} 57^{m} 37.960^{s} +53° 31′ 15.25″ B: 18^{h} 57^{m} 37.911^{s} +53° 31′ 12.92″	M	13.15 + 13.23		Makes a triple system with WD 1856+534 (see above)
G 229-20	B	80.8	Draco	A: 18^{h} 57^{m} 37.960^{s} +53° 31′ 15.25″ B: 18^{h} 57^{m} 37.911^{s} +53° 31′ 12.92″	M			Makes a triple system with WD 1856+534 (see above)
7 Andromedae (Honores)		80.9 ± 0.2		23^{h} 12^{m} 33.004^{s} +49° 24′ 22.35″	F1V	4.52		
HD 1562		81			G0 V	7.024		
Beta Aurigae (Menkalinan)	A$	81.1 ± 0.5	Auriga	05^{h} 59^{m} 31.72293^{s} +44° 56′ 50.7573″	A1m IV	1.89 - 1.98#		
Beta Aurigae (Menkalinan)	B	81.1 ± 0.5	Auriga	05^{h} 59^{m} 31.72293^{s} +44° 56′ 50.7573″	A1m IV			
HR 7294		81.2			G4-6 V	6.47		
HR 7293		81.2			G4-6 V	6.59		
HR 1747		81.3			G0 V	5.96		
HR 672		81.5		02^{h} 18^{m} 01.44332^{s} +01° 45′ 28.1235″	G0.5 IVb	5.598		
GJ 2057		81.7			G5-K2 V	8.169		
Alcor (80 Ursae Majoris)	A$	81.7 ± 0.3	Ursa Major	13^{h} 25^{m} 13.53783^{s} +54° 59′ 16.6548″	A5Vn	+3.99#		
Alcor (80 Ursae Majoris)	B	81.7 ± 0.3	Ursa Major	13^{h} 25^{m} 13.53783^{s} +54° 59′ 16.6548″	M3-4			
Beta Ophiuchi (Cebalrai)$		81.8 ± 0.3	Ophiuchus	17^{h} 43^{m} 28.35191^{s} +04° 34′ 02.2932″	K2IIICN0.5	2.749#		
HD 215500		81.9			G8 V	7.496		
Alpha Phoenicis (Ankaa)$		82 ± 1	Phoenix	00^{h} 26^{m} 17.06309^{s} −42° 18′ 21.7712″	K0.5IIIb	2.377#		
UPM J1040−3551	Aa	82.46 ± 0.07		10^{h} 40^{m} 55.495^{s} −35° 51′ 31.15″	M4			
UPM J1040−3551	Ab	82.46 ± 0.07		10^{h} 40^{m} 55.495^{s} −35° 51′ 31.15″	M4			
UPM J1040−3551	Ba	82.46 ± 0.07		10^{h} 40^{m} 55.495^{s} −35° 51′ 31.15″	T7			
UPM J1040−3551	Bb	82.46 ± 0.07		10^{h} 40^{m} 55.495^{s} −35° 51′ 31.15″	T8			
Mizar (Zeta Ursae Majoris)	A$	82.9 ± 0.6	Ursa Major	13^{h} 23^{m} 55.54048^{s} +54° 55′ 31.2671″	A2Vp/A2Vp	2.04 + 2.23 + 3.88#		
Mizar (Zeta Ursae Majoris)	B	82.9 ± 0.6	Ursa Major	13^{h} 23^{m} 55.54048^{s} +54° 55′ 31.2671″	kA1h(eA)mA7IV-V			
GJ 1229		82.1			G8 V	7.205		
L 168-9 (Danfeng)		82.13 ± 0.05		23^{h} 20^{m} 07.52452^{s} −60° 03′ 54.6447″	M1V	11.02		Has one known exoplanet
HR 7345		82.3			G8 V	6.291		
HD 166435		82.3			G0 V	6.829		
HD 37706		82.4			G5 V	9.25		
HD 92786		82.4			G5 V	8.006		
Alioth (Epsilon Ursae Majoris)$		82.6 ± 0.4	Ursa Major	12^{h} 54^{m} 01.74959^{s} +55° 57′ 35.3627″	A1III-IVp kB9	1.77#		33rd brightest star in the night sky.
HD 96700		82.79 ± 0.04		11^{h} 07^{m} 54.427^{s} −30° 10′ 28.45″	G0V	6.51		Has three known exoplanets and one possible stellar companion
Lambda² Fornacis		82.9 ± 0.1	Fornax	02^{h} 36^{m} 58.60775^{s} −34° 34′ 40.7113″	G1V	5.78		
Zeta Aquilae (Okab)$		83.0 ± 0.3	Aquila	19^{h} 05^{m} 24.60802^{s} +13° 51′ 48.5182″	A0 Vn	2.983#		
HR 176		83.1			G1V			
44 Ophiuchi		83.2 ± 0.5	Ophiuchus	17^{h} 26^{m} 22.21749^{s} −24° 10′ 31.1190″	kA5hA9mF1III	4.16		
Phecda (Gamma Ursae Majoris)	A$	83.2 ± 0.8	Ursa Major	11^{h} 53^{m} 49.84732^{s} +53° 41′ 41.1350″	A0 Ve	2.438#		
Phecda (Gamma Ursae Majoris)	B	83.2 ± 0.8	Ursa Major	11^{h} 53^{m} 49.84732^{s} +53° 41′ 41.1350″	K2V			
HD 205905		83.4			G2-4 IV-V			
Zeta Cancri (Tegmine)	A$	83.4	Cancer	08^{h} 12^{m} 12.726^{s} +17° 38′ 51.96″	F7V	+4.67#		
Zeta Cancri (Tegmine)	B	83.4	Cancer	08^{h} 12^{m} 12.726^{s} +17° 38′ 51.96″	F9V			
Zeta Cancri (Tegmine)	C	83.4	Cancer	08^{h} 12^{m} 12.726^{s} +17° 38′ 51.96″	G0V			
Zeta Cancri (Tegmine)	D	83.4	Cancer	08^{h} 12^{m} 12.726^{s} +17° 38′ 51.96″	G0V			
HD 13531		83.4			G0V			
HD 67458		83.5			G2-4 IV-V			
HD 8262		83.5			G3 V			
HD 225261		83.5			G9 V			
HD 9986		83.05 ± 0.09	Pisces	01^{h} 37^{m} 40.87904^{s} +12° 04′ 42.1703″	G5 V	6.77		
HD 107692		83.6			G3 IV-V			
HD 72946		83.67 ± 0.09	Cancer	08^{h} 35^{m} 51.267^{s} +06° 37′ 21.95″	G5V	7.25		
HD 45391		83.7			G0 V			
HD 115043		83.8			G1 Va			
HR 2290		83.8			G3-4V			
HD 42250		83.9			G5-7 V			
HD 25874		83.9			G5 IV-V			
Mu Ceti		84.1 ± 0.7	Cetus	02^{h} 44^{m} 56.53735^{s} +10° 06′ 50.9217″	A9IIIp	+4.27		
HR 2576		84.1			G3-5 IV			
HD 224619		84.2			G8 V			
HD 23052		84.2			G0 V			
HD 5996		84.2			G5 V			
HD 218687		84.3			G0 V			
HD 223913		84.4			G0 V			
HD 3821		84.4			G0 V			
HIP 57274		84.4 ± 0.1	Ursa Major	11^{h} 44^{m} 40.9643^{s} +30° 57′ 33.451″	K5V	8.96		Has 3 exoplanets.
Lambda Andromedae (Udkadua)	A$	84.6±0.3	Andromeda	23^{h} 37^{m} 33.84278^{s} +46° 27′ 29.3447″	G8IV	3.65 - 4.05#	38.5736±0.1179	
Lambda Andromedae (Udkadua)	B	84.6±0.3	Andromeda	23^{h} 37^{m} 33.84278^{s} +46° 27′ 29.3447″	L	3.65 - 4.05#	38.5736±0.1179	
HD 187237		84.8			G2 III			
HD 103949		84.8			K3 V			
LHS 480		84.9			M3V			
HD 72945		84.9 ± 0.3		08^{h} 35^{m} 50.978^{s} +06° 37′ 12.77″	F8 V	5.91		
HD 194012		84.93 ± 0.05	Delphinus	20^{h} 22^{m} 52.3692^{s} +14° 33′ 03.9513″	F7 V	6.15±0.01		
System	Star or (sub-) brown dwarf	Distance (ly)	Constellation	Coordinates: RA, Dec (Ep J2000, Eq J2000)	Stellar class	Apparent magnitude (V)	Parallax (mas)	Notes and additional references

== See also ==
- List of Stars
- List of nearest stars
- List of star systems within 75–80 light-years
- List of star systems within 85–90 light-years
