= List of star systems within 90–95 light-years =

This is a list of star systems within 90–95 light years of Earth.

== List ==
Key
#	Visible to the unaided eye
$	Bright star (absolute magnitude of +8.5 or brighter)
‡	White dwarf
§	Brown dwarf or sub-brown dwarf
*	Nearest in constellation

System	Star or (sub-) brown dwarf	Distance (ly)	Constellation	Coordinates: RA, Dec (Ep J2000, Eq J2000)	Stellar class	Apparent magnitude (V)	Parallax (mas)	Notes and additional references
Beta Eridani (Cursa)$		90.0 ± 0.9	Eridanus	05^{h} 07^{m} 50.98549^{s} −05° 05′ 11.2055″	A3 III var	2.796#	36.2456±0.3575	
HD 40650		90	Auriga		F5			
G 111-52		90			M			
G 264-20	A	90			M			
G 264-20	B	90			M			
WT 2473		90			M			
L 96-2		90			M			
2MASS J23392527+3507165§		90			L4pec			
G 240-44		90			M3V			
EGGR 251‡		90			DQ6			
LP 368-73		90			M			
L 95-2		90			M1V			
2MASS J13373116+4938367		90			M9V			
SCR J1609-3431		90			M			
2MASS J14450958-4954540		90.1			M			
L 149-51	A	90.1			K3V			
L 149-51	B	90.1			M4V			
HD 314741		90.1			K5Ve			
BD+23 3035		90.1			K3V			
LSPM J0747+1107‡		90.1			DA			
HD 55720		90.1			G8V			
PM J19117+0500		90.1			M1Ve			
SCR J0907-3533		90.1			M			
L 15-86		90.1			M2			
UCAC4 698-055819		90.1			M			
BD+49 2743	A	90.1			K6V			
BD+49 2743	B	90.1			?			
HD 155918	A	90.1			G2VFe-1.0CH-0.6			
HD 155918	B	90.1			M			
StKM 2-1217		90.1			K5V			
RX J0506.2+0439		90.1			M4.5V			
G 135-35		90.1			M			
KPP 3922	A	90.1			M			
KPP 3922	B	90.1			M			
LP 938-144		90.1			M4.5Ve			
LP 645-49		90.1			M			
G 238-54		90.1			M1.5Ve			
LP 786-22		90.1			K9Vk			
G 79-46		90.1			M			
LP 182-4		90.1			M5.5Ve			
L 66-47		90.2			M1			
SIPS J0719-5051§		90.2			L0			
LP 868-19		90.2			M3V			
G 189-11		90.2			M			
LP 833-49		90.2			M3.5Ve			
L 66-46		90.2			M			
2MASS J04235322-0006587		90.2			M8.5			
CD-22 13916		90.2			K8Vk			
LSPM J1909+3910		90.2			M2.0Ve			
UCAC4 642-125473		90.2			M			
2MASS J10305544-1424005‡		90.2			DA			
LP 585-55	A	90.2			M5			
LP 585-55	B	90.2			M6			
HD 28946		90.2			G9V			
HD 329879		90.2			M1			
LP 566-6		90.2			M3.6			
LP 427-38		90.2			M7e			
L 122-81		90.3			M			
PM J10581+5057		90.3			M3.52			
LSPM J1305+1934		90.3			M6.5			
LP 275-37		90.3			M			
L 254-34		90.3			M			
WT 2132		90.3			M			
HD 146946		90.3			F9V			
HD 82943 (164 G. Hydrae)		90.31 ± 0.07	Hydra	09^{h} 34^{m} 50.735^{s} −12° 07′ 46.37″	F9 V Fe+0.5	6.54	36.1158±0.0264	Has 2 confirmed (HD 82943 b and c) and 1 unconfirmed exoplanets.
TOI-4559		90.704 ±0.0978			M			Has one confirmed exoplanet (TOI-4559b)
Xi Scorpii (Graffias)	A	90.88 ± 0.05	Scorpius	16^{h} 04^{m} 22.191^{s} -11° 22′ 22.60″	F4(V)	4.17		
Xi Scorpii (Graffias)	B	90.88 ± 0.05	Scorpius	16^{h} 04^{m} 22.191^{s} -11° 22′ 22.60″	F6(V)			
Xi Scorpii (Graffias)	C	90.88 ± 0.05	Scorpius	16^{h} 04^{m} 22.191^{s} -11° 22′ 22.60″	G1V			
Xi Scorpii (Graffias)	D	90.88 ± 0.05	Scorpius	16^{h} 04^{m} 22.191^{s} -11° 22′ 22.60″	K1(V)	7.43		
Xi Scorpii (Graffias)	E	90.92 ± 0.06	Scorpius	16^{h} 04^{m} 22.191^{s} -11° 22′ 22.60″	K1(V)	7.81		
Kappa Ophiuchi$		91.5±0.5	Ophiuchus	16^{h} 57^{m} 40.09785^{s} +09° 22′ 30.1126″	K2III	3.20#	35.66±0.20	
13 Orionis		92	Orion	05^{h} 07^{m} 38.32^{s} +09° 28′ 21.8″	G1IV			
Theta Pegasi (Biham/26 Pegasi)	A$	92 ± 2	Pegasus	22^{h} 10^{m} 11.98528^{s} +06° 11′ 52.3078″	A2V	+3.52#		
Theta Pegasi (Biham/26 Pegasi)	B	92 ± 2	Pegasus	22^{h} 10^{m} 11.98528^{s} +06° 11′ 52.3078″	M4-5.5			
Zeta Aquarii	A$	92 ± 3	Aquarius	22^{h} 28^{m} 49.888^{s} -00° 01′ 11.87″	F3 V	3.65#		
Zeta Aquarii	B	92 ± 3	Aquarius	22^{h} 28^{m} 49.888^{s} -00° 01′ 11.87″	F6 IV			
Eta Draconis (Athebyne)$		92.1±0.2	Draco	16^{h} 23^{m} 59.48594^{s} +61° 30′ 51.1699″	G8 III	2.73#		
21 Leonis Minoris$		92.1 ± 0.5	Leo Minor	10^{h} 07^{m} 25.76296^{s} +35° 14′ 40.8965″	A7V	4.47–4.52#		
Pi Piscis Austrini	A	92.2 ± 0.6	Piscis Austrinus	23^{h} 03^{m} 29.81653^{s} -34° 44′ 57.8827″	F1 V Fe-0.8	5.12		
Pi Piscis Austrini	B	92.2 ± 0.6	Piscis Austrinus	23^{h} 03^{m} 29.81653^{s} -34° 44′ 57.8827″	F3 V			
111 Herculis$		92.3 ± 0.7	Hercules	18^{h} 47^{m} 01.23246^{s} +21° 46′ 53.4381″	A5III	4.34#		
HD 93083 (Macondo)		92.91 ± 0.06		10^{h} 44^{m} 20.91501^{s} -33° 34′ 37.2880″	K2IV-V or K3V	8.30		
Gliese 3138		92.9			G			Has 3 exoplanets.
Beta Circini$		93 ± 1	Circinus	15^{h} 17^{m} 30.84945^{s} -58° 48′ 04.3453″	A0 Vn	2.983#		
HD 70060 (q Puppis)		93.4 ± 0.5	Puppis	08^{h} 18^{m} 33.31299^{s} -36° 39′ 33.4391″	A8V	4.45		
Omega Andromedae	A	93.9±0.4	Andromeda	01^{h} 27^{m} 39.38072^{s} +45° 24′ 24.0651″	F5IVe or F3V	4.83	34.7332±0.1341	
Omega Andromedae	B	93.9±0.4	Andromeda	01^{h} 27^{m} 39.38072^{s} +45° 24′ 24.0651″	F5V	4.83	34.7332±0.1341	
HR 7012		93.9 ± 0.4	Pavo	18^{h} 45^{m} 26.9^{s} −64° 52′ 16.53″	A5-7 IV-V	4.77	34.7355 ± 0.1575	planetary collision
Algol (Beta Persei/Demon Star)	A$	94 ± 2	Perseus	03^{h} 08^{m} 10.13245^{s} +40° 57′ 20.3280″	B8 V	2.12#		
Algol (Beta Persei/Demon Star)	B	94 ± 2	Perseus	03^{h} 08^{m} 10.13245^{s} +40° 57′ 20.3280″	K0 IV			
Algol (Beta Persei/Demon Star)	C	94 ± 2	Perseus	03^{h} 08^{m} 10.13245^{s} +40° 57′ 20.3280″	F1 V			
Omega² Tauri		94 ± 1	Taurus	04^{h} 17^{m} 15.66155^{s} +20° 34′ 42.9340″	A3m	+4.914		
15 Ursae Majoris		94.0 ± 0.7	Ursa Major	09^{h} 08^{m} 52.25763^{s} +51° 36′ 16.7330″	kA3VmF5IIISr	4.46		
HD 218566 (Ebla)		94.1 ± 0.1		23^{h} 09^{m} 10.72701^{s} -02° 15′ 38.6854″	K3 V	8.628		
Nu Indi		94.3	Indus	22^{h} 24^{m} 36.88539^{s} −72° 15′ 19.4882″	G0IV			
Chi Leonis		94.6±0.5	Leo	11^{h} 05^{m} 01.02754^{s} +07° 20′ 09.6235″	F2III	4.63		
Zeta Aquarii	B	94.7 ± 0.9	Aquarius	22^{h} 28^{m} 49.888^{s} -00° 01′ 11.87″	F6 IV	4.51		
46 Leonis Minoris (Praecipua)$		94.9±0.6	Leo Minor	10^{h} 53^{m} 18.70487^{s} +34° 12′ 53.5375″	K0+III-IV	3.83#		
System	Star or (sub-) brown dwarf	Distance (ly)	Constellation	Coordinates: RA, Dec (Ep J2000, Eq J2000)	Stellar class	Apparent magnitude (V)	Parallax (mas)	Notes and additional references

== See also ==
- List of nearest stars
- List of star systems within 85–90 light-years
- List of star systems within 95–100 light-years
