= Königstuhl 1 =

Binary star in the constellation Phoenix

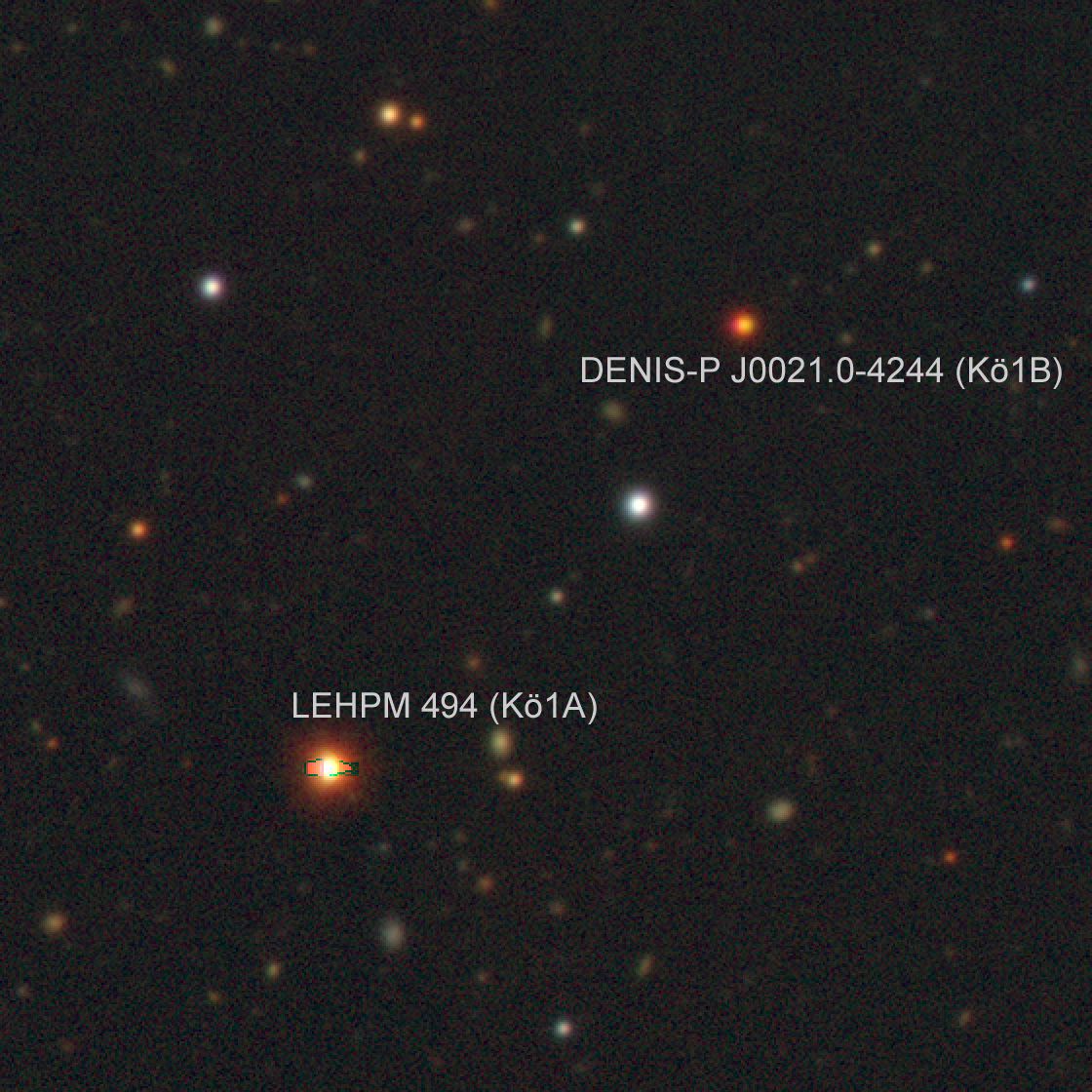
- The red stars are the components of the Königstuhl 1 binary

Observation data Epoch J2000 Equinox J2000
- Constellation: Phoenix
- LEHPM 494
- Right ascension: 00^{h} 21^{m} 10.74^{s}
- Declination: −42° 45′ 40.2″
- DENIS-P J0021.0-4244
- Right ascension: 00^{h} 21^{m} 05.92^{s}
- Declination: −42° 44′ 43.5″

Characteristics
- Evolutionary stage: red dwarf
- Spectral type: M6+M9.5

Astrometry

LEHPM 494
Proper motion (μ)	RA: +255.184±0.031 mas/yr Dec.: −12.475±0.039 mas/yr
Parallax (π)	37.3319±0.0378 mas
Distance	87.37 ± 0.09 ly (26.79 ± 0.03 pc)

DENIS-P J0021.0-4244
Proper motion (μ)	RA: +257.820±0.374 mas/yr Dec.: −0.028±0.391 mas/yr
Parallax (π)	37.9335±0.4038 mas
Distance	86.0 ± 0.9 ly (26.4 ± 0.3 pc)

Details

LEHPM 494
Mass	0.103±0.006 M_{☉}
Temperature	2,850±100 K

DENIS-P J0021.0-4244
Mass	0.079±0.004 M_{☉}
Temperature	2,250±100 K
Rotational velocity (v sin i)	17.5±2.5 km/s

Position (relative to LEHPM 494)
Component	DENIS-P J0021.0-4244
Angular distance	77.78″
Position angle	317.0°
Projected separation	2083.4 AU

Other designations
- WDS J00212-4246
- LEHPM 494: 2MASS J00211072-4245401, WISEA J002110.98-424540.3, TIC 7150628
- DENIS-P J0021.0-4244: 2MASS J00210589-4244433, 2MUCD 20018, USNO-B1.0 0472-00004560, WISEA J002106.15-424443.4

Database references
SIMBAD	data

Königstuhl 1 (KO-1, Kö 1, Koenigstuhl 1) is a binary consisting of the red dwarf LEHPM 494 and the M- or L-type star or brown dwarf DENIS-P J0021.0-4244. While similar low-mass wide binary were known in young star-forming regions, Königstuhl1 was the first wide binary detected in the field and was not associated with a star-forming region.

== Name and discovery ==
The individual components were known since 1998 (DENIS survey) and 2003 (LEHPM survey), but the binary status was not noticed until José A. Caballero studied them in 2007 and discovered that they move in the same direction. This similar motion was first revealed in the USNO-B1/NOMAD1 proper motion surveys. Caballero also collected 22 years of data to show that the proper motion is consistent. He named the pair Königstuhl 1 because he worked at the Max Planck Institute for Astronomy, which is located on top of the Königstuhl. Other low-mass binaries were discovered by Caballero in the Koenigstuhl survey and called Koenigstuhl 1, Koenigstuhl 2 (Kö 2, Kö 3). The last addition was Koenigstuhl 7 in 2014.

== The binary ==
In the discovery paper Caballero reports a spectral type of M6V for the primary Kö 1A and a mass of around 10% of the sun.

The spectral type of the secondary Kö 1B was first estimated to be >M9V and later the optical spectral type was determined to be M9.5V. Caballero determined a mass of 79 to 87 M_{J} for the secondary. The binary components are separated by around 1800 astronomical units. This wide orbit also meant that the gravitational binding energy is very low for the binary. At this time one theory existed that explained the presence of low-mass stars and brown dwarfs with the fragmentation and ejection of stellar embryos from molecular clouds. The presence of wide binaries in the field are hard to explain by such a scenario.

The infrared spectral type of Kö 1B was determined to be L0.6: in 2014. The gravity on this object is consistent with other old field dwarfs. Later it was determined that Kö 1 could be part of the 200 Myr old Carina Near Association. If this is true, Kö 1B would be less massive and it would have a mass of 51.88±3.6 M_{J}. A more precise separation of 2083.4 AU was reported in 2021 and Kö 1B might have two components.

== See also ==
Other low-mass wide binaries:

- 2MASS J11011926−7732383
- WISE 2150−7520
- SDSS J141624.08+134826.7
- UScoCTIO 108
- Oph 162225-240515
