= List of star systems within 85–90 light-years =

This is a list of star systems within 85–90 light years of Earth.

The closest M-type red giant star, Gacrux, is in this list.

Most data from this list come from the SIMBAD database.

== List ==
Key
#	Visible to the unaided eye
$	Bright star (absolute magnitude of +8.5 or brighter)
‡	White dwarf
§	Brown dwarf or sub-brown dwarf
*	Nearest in constellation

System	Star or (sub-) brown dwarf	Distance (ly)	Constellation	Coordinates: RA, Dec (Ep J2000, Eq J2000)	Stellar class	Apparent magnitude (V)	Parallax (mas)	Notes and additional references
HD 142 B		85.31 ± 0.08	Phoenix	00^{h} 06^{m} 19.1480^{s} −49° 04′ 34.9177″	K8.5-M1.5	11.5		
HD 142 A		85.39 ± 0.08	Phoenix	00^{h} 06^{m} 19.1754^{s} −49° 04′ 30.6741″	F7V	5.711±0.003		Has three confirmed exoplanets
23 Librae		85.39 ± 0.08	Libra	15^{h} 13^{m} 28.6669^{s} −25° 18′ 33.6534″	G5 V	6.45		Has two confirmed exoplanets
HD 60532		85.5 ± 0.2	Puppis	07^{h} 34^{m} 03.181^{s} −22° 17′ 45.84″	F6 IV-V	4.450		Has two confirmed exoplanets
18 Boötis		85.5 ± 0.3	Boötes	14^{h} 19^{m} 16.27966^{s} +13° 00′ 15.4859″	F3V	5.41		
DO Canum Venaticorum		85.38 ± 0.05	Canis Venatici		K0	8.54		
Gamma Crateris	A$	85.6 ± 0.8	Crater	11^{h} 24^{m} 52.92362^{s} −17° 41′ 02.4300″	A9V	4.06#		
Gamma Crateris	B	85.6 ± 0.8	Crater	11^{h} 24^{m} 52.92362^{s} −17° 41′ 02.4300″	K2V			
FN Ceti		86	Cetus		K0V			
Königstuhl 1A (LEHPM 494)		86.0 ± 0.9	Phoenix	00^{h} 21^{m} 10.74^{s} −42° 45′ 40.2″	M6			
V450 Andromedae (HD 13507)		86.07 ± 0.14	Andromeda		G5V	7.21		Has a brown dwarf companion
HD 39194		86.23 ± 0.05	Mensa	05^{h} 44^{m} 31.9180^{s} −70° 08′ 36.858″	K0V	8.07		Has three known exoplanets
FN Ceti		86.27 ± 0.07	Cetus		K0V	7.77		
HD 117635		86.29 ± 1.39			G8V	7.36		
HD 204521		85.97 ± 0.04	Cepheus	21^{h} 25^{m} 16.79696^{s} +70° 28′ 39.1434″	G0V	7.26		
Delta Corvi (Algorab)$		86.9 ± 0.4	Corvus	12^{h} 29^{m} 51.85517^{s} −16° 30′ 55.5525″	A0 IV(n) kB9	2.962#		
Gamma Boötis (Seginus)	A$	86.8 ± 0.3	Boötes	14^{h} 32^{m} 04.672^{s} +38° 18′ 29.69″	A7IV(n)	3.03#		
Gamma Boötis (Seginus)	B	86.8 ± 0.3	Boötes	14^{h} 32^{m} 04.672^{s} +38° 18′ 29.69″	A7III			
72 Ophiuchi		86.9 ± 0.5	Ophiuchus	18^{h} 07^{m} 20.98393^{s} +09° 33′ 49.8501″	A5 V	3.73 + 14.0		
LP 791-18 (TOI-736)		86.92 ± 0.09		11^{h} 02^{m} 45.95462^{s} −16° 24′ 22.2882″	M6.1±0.7V	16.9±0.2		Has three confirmed exoplanets
Rho Indi		87.06 ± 0.06	Indus	22^{h} 54^{m} 39.482^{s} −70° 04′ 25.35″	G1 V Fe+0.3	6.05		Has one confirmed exoplanet
Beta Columbae (Wazn)$		87.2 ± 0.3	Columba	05^{h} 50^{m} 57.5929^{s} −35° 46′ 05.915″	K1III_CN+1	3.105#		
37 Ursae Majoris		87.34 ± 0.14	Ursa Major	10^{h} 35^{m} 09.62^{s} +57° 04′ 57.2″	F2V	5.148		
HD 4838		87.35 ± 0.27			K4.5Vk:	9.51		
Königstuhl 1B (DENIS-P J0021.0-4244)		87.37 ± 0.09	Phoenix	00^{h} 21^{m} 05.92^{s} −42° 44′ 43.5″	M9.5			
HD 134606		87.44 ± 0.04		15^{h} 15^{m} 15.04464^{s} −70° 31′ 10.6449″	G6 IV	6.86		Has five confirmed exoplanets
Iota Crateris		87.5 ± 0.2	Crater	11^{h} 38^{m} 40.01668^{s} −13° 12′ 06.9963″	F6.5V	5.48		
p Velorum	A	87.5 ± 0.8	Vela	10^{h} 37^{m} 18.13995^{s} −48° 13′ 32.2349″	F3IV	3.83#		
p Velorum	B	87.5 ± 0.8	Vela	10^{h} 37^{m} 18.13995^{s} −48° 13′ 32.2349″	F0V			
p Velorum	C$	87.5 ± 0.8	Vela	10^{h} 37^{m} 18.13995^{s} −48° 13′ 32.2349″	A6V			
AF Leporis		87.55 ± 0.05	Lepus	05^{h} 27^{m} 04.76333^{s} −11° 54′ 03.4660″	F8V(n)k:	6.26–6.35		Has one confirmed exoplanet (AF Lep b)
9 Aurigae C (V398 Aurigae)		87.65 ± 0.04	Auriga	05^{h} 06^{m} 40.62967^{s} +51° 35′ 51.8025″	K5Ve	4.93 - 5.03		
15 Pegasi		87.8 ± 0.12			F2V	5.53		
9 Aurigae (V398 Aurigae)	B	88.0 ± 0.1	Auriga	05^{h} 06^{m} 40.62967^{s} +51° 35′ 51.8025″	M	4.93 - 5.03		
9 Aurigae (V398 Aurigae)	A	88.0 ± 0.3	Auriga	05^{h} 06^{m} 40.62967^{s} +51° 35′ 51.8025″	F2V			
Eta Ophiuchi (Sabik)	A$	88 ± 2	Ophiuchus	17^{h} 10^{m} 22.68689^{s} −15° 43′ 29.6639″	A1IV	2.43		
Eta Ophiuchi (Sabik)	B	88 ± 2	Ophiuchus	17^{h} 10^{m} 22.68689^{s} −15° 43′ 29.6639″	A1IV			
Zeta Sagittarii (Ascella)	A$	88 ± 2	Sagittarius	19^{h} 02^{m} 36.73024^{s} −29° 52′ 48.2279″	A2.5Va	2.59#		
Zeta Sagittarii (Ascella)	B	88 ± 2	Sagittarius	19^{h} 02^{m} 36.73024^{s} −29° 52′ 48.2279″	A3V			
54 Cassiopeiae		88.12 ± 0.04	Cassiopeia	02^{h} 09^{m} 80.26080^{s} +71° 33′ 07.2268″	F8V	6.587		
HD 181433		88.03 ± 0.05	Pavo	19^{h} 25^{m} 09.567^{s} −66° 28′ 07.68″	K3III-IV	8.40		Has three confirmed exoplanets
1 Hydrae		88.23 ± 0.15	Hydra	08^{h} 24^{m} 35.14^{s} −03° 45′ 04.2″	F6V	5.61		
HD 144585		88.42	Scorpius		G5V			
Tau³ Eridani$		88.6 ± 0.4	Eridanus	03^{h} 02^{m} 23.49939^{s} −23° 37′ 28.0936″	A3 IV-V	4.10#		
Gacrux (Gamma Crucis)$		88.6±0.4	Crux	12^{h} 31^{m} 09.960^{s} −57° 06′ 47.57″	M3.5III	1.64#		The nearest M-type red giant, and the 25th brightest star in the night sky.
HD 158259		88.11 ± 0.05		17^{h} 25^{m} 24.055^{s} +52° 47′ 26.47″	G0	6.46		Has six confirmed exoplanets and one unconfirmed.
MS Draconis		88.92 ± 0.04	Draco		K0V	8.40		
59 Draconis		89	Draco	19^{h} 09^{m} 09.88146^{s} +76° 33′ 37.8138″	A9-F2 V			
Mu Draconis (Alrakis)		89 ± 1	Draco	17^{h} 05^{m} 20.12403^{s} +54° 28′ 12.0994″	F7V	4.92		
36 G. Doradus		89.1 ± 0.2	Dorado	05^{h} 54^{m} 06.05459^{s} −63° 05′ 23.2090″	K2III	4.66		
HR 3499		89.26 ± 0.06	Leo Minor	08^{h} 50^{m} 32.22282^{s} +33° 17′ 06.1959″	F7Vs	6.21		
HD 77825		89.28 ± 0.05			K2V	8.758		
HD 73524		89.60	Vela		G0Vp			
21 Leonis Minoris		89.75 ± 0.35	Leo Minor	10^{h} 07^{m} 25.76296^{s} +35° 14′ 40.8965″	A7V(n)	4.47–4.52		
HD 179949 (Gumala)		89.82 ± 0.09		19^{h} 15^{m} 33.2301^{s} −24° 10′ 45.671″	F8 V	6.25		
PM J15545-1310		89.9	Libra		M			
LP 644-40		89.959			M			
G 203-71		89.959			M2.5			
2MASS J22273598+1614559		89.974			M			
LP 870-54		89.989			M2.5			
2MASS J17503293+1759042		89.999			T3.5			
System	Star or (sub-) brown dwarf	Distance (ly)	Constellation	Coordinates: RA, Dec (Ep J2000, Eq J2000)	Stellar class	Apparent magnitude (V)	Parallax (mas)	Notes and additional references

== See also ==
- List of star systems within 80–85 light-years
- List of star systems within 90–95 light-years
