= 5 Leonis Minoris =

Star in the constellation Lynx

- Location of 5 Leonis Minoris (circled)

Observation data Epoch J2000.0 Equinox ICRS
- Constellation: Lynx
- Right ascension: 08^{h} 50^{m} 32.22282^{s}
- Declination: +33° 17′ 06.1959″
- Apparent magnitude (V): 6.210

Characteristics
- Evolutionary stage: Main sequence
- Spectral type: F7V
- B−V color index: 0.528
- J−H color index: 0.151
- J−K color index: 0.227

Astrometry
| Radial velocity (R_{v}) | 4.212±0.0015 km/s |
| Proper motion (μ) | RA: −63.320 mas/yr Dec.: −83.552 mas/yr |
| Parallax (π) | 36.5201±0.0252 mas |
| Distance | 89.31 ± 0.06 ly (27.38 ± 0.02 pc) |
| Absolute magnitude (M_{V}) | 3.93±0.05 |

Details
| Mass | 1.211+0.026 −0.020 M_{☉} |
| Radius | 1.24+0.05 −0.03 R_{☉} |
| Luminosity | 2.11±0.10 (Note: Calculated from absolute magnitude.) L_{☉} |
| Surface gravity (log g) | 4.34±0.03 cgs |
| Temperature | 6258±44 K |
| Metallicity [Fe/H] | 0.24±0.03 dex |
| Rotation | 3.56+0.11 −0.14 d |
| Rotational velocity (v sin i) | 9±0.5 km/s |
| Age | 1.88+0.72 −0.92 Gyr |

Other designations
- AG+33° 897, BD+33°1765, GC 12187, HD 75332, HIP 43410, HR 3499, SAO 61074, PPM 74024, TIC 284898141, TYC 2488-849-1, GSC 02488-00849, 2MASS J08503222+3317061, Gaia DR2 1491593733326694912, Gaia DR3 716109930305855360

Database references
| SIMBAD | data |

5 Leonis Minoris (5 LMi), commonly referred to as HD 75332, is a yellow-white star in the northern constellation of Lynx, close to the border with Cancer. With an apparent magnitude of 6.210, it is near the limit for naked eye observation, and can be seen faintly under very dark skies. As such, the Bright Star Catalogue lists it as HR 3499. It is located at a distance of 89.31 light-years (27.38 parsecs) according to Gaia DR3 parallax measurements, and is moving farther away at a heliocentric radial velocity of 4.212 km/s.

== Properties ==
This is an ordinary F-type main-sequence star with the stellar classification F7V, meaning it is fusing hydrogen into helium at its core to generate energy. It is 24% larger than the Sun and 21% more massive, emitting 2.11 times the luminosity of the Sun from its photosphere at an effective temperature of 6,258 K (5,985 °C; 10,805 °F). It is roughly 40% the age of the Solar System at 1.88 billion years old. Its physical properties are similar to that of some of the hotter exoplanet-hosting stars, such as Iota Horologii, HD 52265, and HD 209458.

Compared to the Sun, the star is overall slightly more enriched in elements heavier than hydrogen and helium, with a metallicity measured at [M/H] = 0.05±0.03 dex (i.e., 12±8 % richer). It is about 120 times richer in lithium ([Li/H]=2.08±0.05 dex), and also substantially enhanced in calcium, scandium, titanium, iron, and nickel, but somewhat poor in nitrogen (10^{−0.11} ≈ 78% the solar abundance). Due to its high metal content, it was predicted in 2001 that a giant planet will almost certainly be found around 5 LMi. Likewise, a 2019 paper gave a 65% chance that the star is orbited by a planet with a mass greater than 0.0945 M_{J}. However, no exoplanets have been discovered in orbit as of January 2021.

== Stellar activity ==
In 2019, the star was discovered to exhibit cyclical chromospheric activity, measured by the Mount Wilson S-index, with a period of approximately 180 days. This is much shorter than the 11-year activity cycle of the Sun and bears resemblance to that displayed by other F-type stars including Tau Boötis, HD 16673, HD 49933, and 89 Leonis. A follow-up study in 2021 confirmed the short-term periodicity (~193.5 days), together with two longer cycles each lasting ~3.9 years and ~31.5 years. Additionally, their observations of the stellar magnetic field showed a rapid cycle with a period of approximately 1.06 years, also much shorter than the Sun's. In this regard it is again akin to τ Boo, which harbors a hot Jupiter (b), whereas 5 LMi does not. Such cycles are probably innate to late F-type stars and caused by their thin convection zones.

== See also ==
- List of star systems within 85–90 light-years
