= 110 Herculis =

Star in the constellation Hercules

- Location of 110 Herculis (circled in red)

Observation data Epoch J2000 Equinox ICRS
- Constellation: Hercules
- Right ascension: 18^{h} 45^{m} 39.72570^{s}
- Declination: +20° 32′ 46.7171″
- Apparent magnitude (V): 4.19

Characteristics
- Evolutionary stage: main sequence
- Spectral type: F6V
- U−B color index: +0.005
- B−V color index: +0.45

Astrometry
Radial velocity (R_{v})	23.37±0.1 km/s
Proper motion (μ)	RA: −8.87 mas/yr Dec.: −334.56 mas/yr
Parallax (π)	52.06±0.25 mas
Distance	62.7 ± 0.3 ly (19.21 ± 0.09 pc)
Absolute magnitude (M_{V})	2.77

Details
Mass	1.4–1.7 M_{☉}
Radius	2.005±0.042 R_{☉}
Luminosity	5.68±0.25 L_{☉}
Surface gravity (log g)	3.93±0.02 cgs
Temperature	6,303±21 K
Metallicity [Fe/H]	+0.04 dex
Rotation	<7.2 days
Rotational velocity (v sin i)	14.08 km/s
Age	1.6–4.7 Gyr

Other designations
- BD+20°3926, FK5 703, GJ 725.2, GJ 9635, HD 173667, HIP 92043, HR 7061, SAO 86406

Database references
SIMBAD	data
ARICNS	data

110 Herculis (abbreviated to 110 Her) is a star in the northern constellation of Hercules. Its apparent magnitude is 4.19, and it can be faintly seen with the naked eye, according to the Bortle scale. Based on parallax estimates made by the Hipparcos spacecraft, the star is located fairly close, about 62.7 light-years (19.21 parsecs) away.

110 Herculis has a spectrum matching that of an F-type main-sequence star. It is about 1.4 to 1.7 times more massive than the Sun, and about two times wider than the Sun. Its effective temperature is about 6400 K. An infrared excess has been detected, indicating the presence of a circumstellar disk.

110 Herculis is the 17th-brightest star in the constellation. It is located in the sky about halfway between Rasalhague in Ophiuchus and Albireo in Cygnus, offset a trifle west. 110 Herculis, along with its apparent neighbors 111 Herculis, 112 Herculis, and 113 Herculis lie close to the eastern edge of the constellation of Hercules.
