= WISE 2150−7520 =

Star in the constellation Octans

WISE 2150−7520 AB
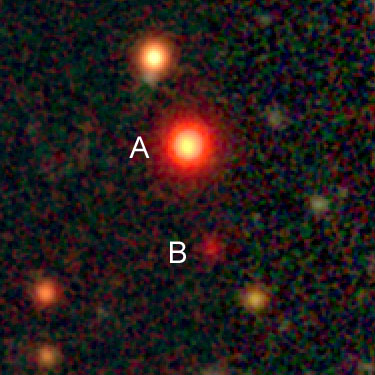
- WISE 2150−7520AB with the legacy surveys

Observation data Epoch J2000.0 Equinox ICRS
- Constellation: Octans
- W2150 A
- Right ascension: 21^{h} 50^{m} 15.77173^{s}
- Declination: −75° 20′ 36.7277″
- W2150 B
- Right ascension: 21^{h} 50^{m} 18.99792^{s}
- Declination: −75° 20′ 54.5964″

Characteristics
- Spectral type: L1+T8

Astrometry
Proper motion (μ)	RA: 888.627 ± 0.502 mas/yr Dec.: -298.234 ± 0.518 mas/yr
Parallax (π)	41.3593±0.2799 mas
Distance	78.9 ± 0.5 ly (24.2 ± 0.2 pc)

Details

W2150 A
Mass	72 ± 12 M_{Jup}
Radius	1.03 ± 0.06 R_{Jup}
Luminosity	0.000204 L_{☉}
Surface gravity (log g)	5.2 ± 0.2 cgs
Temperature	2118 ± 62 K
Age	0.5 - 10 Gyr

W2150 B
Mass	34 ± 22 M_{Jup}
Radius	0.95 ± 0.16 R_{Jup}
Luminosity	0.00000229 L_{☉}
Surface gravity (log g)	4.9 ± 0.5 cgs
Temperature	719 ± 61 K
Age	0.5 - 10 Gyr

Position (relative to A)
Component	B
Angular distance	14.1″
Projected separation	341 AU

Other designations
- 2MASS J21501592−7520367, WISE 2150−7520 AB, SIPS J2150−7520

Database references

A
SIMBAD	data

B
SIMBAD	data

WISE 2150−7520 AB (abbreviated W2150AB) is a binary brown dwarf 78.9 light-years distant from Earth in the southern constellation Octans. The system is a wide binary with a separation of 341 astronomical units. The primary of the system was discovered in 2005 as an infrared object with high proper motion and in 2008 was found to be an ultracool dwarf with a spectral type of L. The secondary, a much cooler T dwarf, was discovered by volunteers of the citizen science project Backyard Worlds: Planet 9, using data from the Wide-field Infrared Survey Explorer (WISE). The system was followed up by the project scientists with Magellan and Spitzer and a scientific paper describing the binary was published in the Astrophysical Journal in 2020.

The system belongs to only a few brown dwarf binaries that can be easily resolved by ground-based telescopes. Another example is SDSS J1416+1348.

== Brown dwarf system ==
The system consists out of a L1 primary with a mass of 72±12 M_{J} and a T8 secondary with a mass of 34±22 M_{J}. The brown dwarfs are separated by 341 astronomical units. Other brown dwarfs show a similar wide binary configuration, like Oph 162225-240515, but most of them are young or have a higher total mass. W2150AB is unusual as it does not show signs of youth. The age of the system was estimated between 0.5 and 10 billion years. The combination of low total mass and large separation results in a low gravitational binding energy for the system. The researchers compared the binding energy and the mass ratio of the system with other brown dwarf binaries and found 2M1101AB as a younger sibling. W2150AB must have formed like other brown dwarf binaries in a more crowded region and left this natal region surviving any interactions with nearby stars or giant molecular clouds that could easily perturb this pair, leaving only two single brown dwarfs.

== Gallery ==
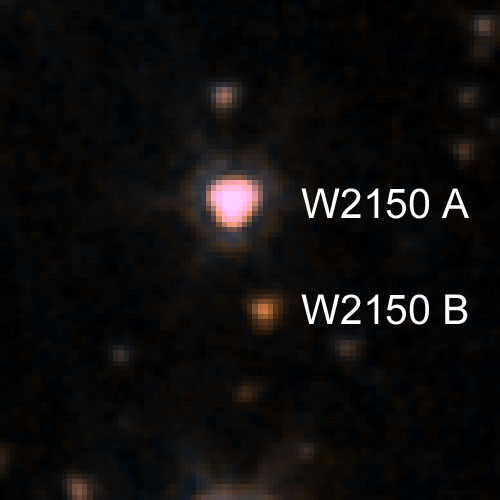
Image of the system taken with the Spitzer Space Telescope

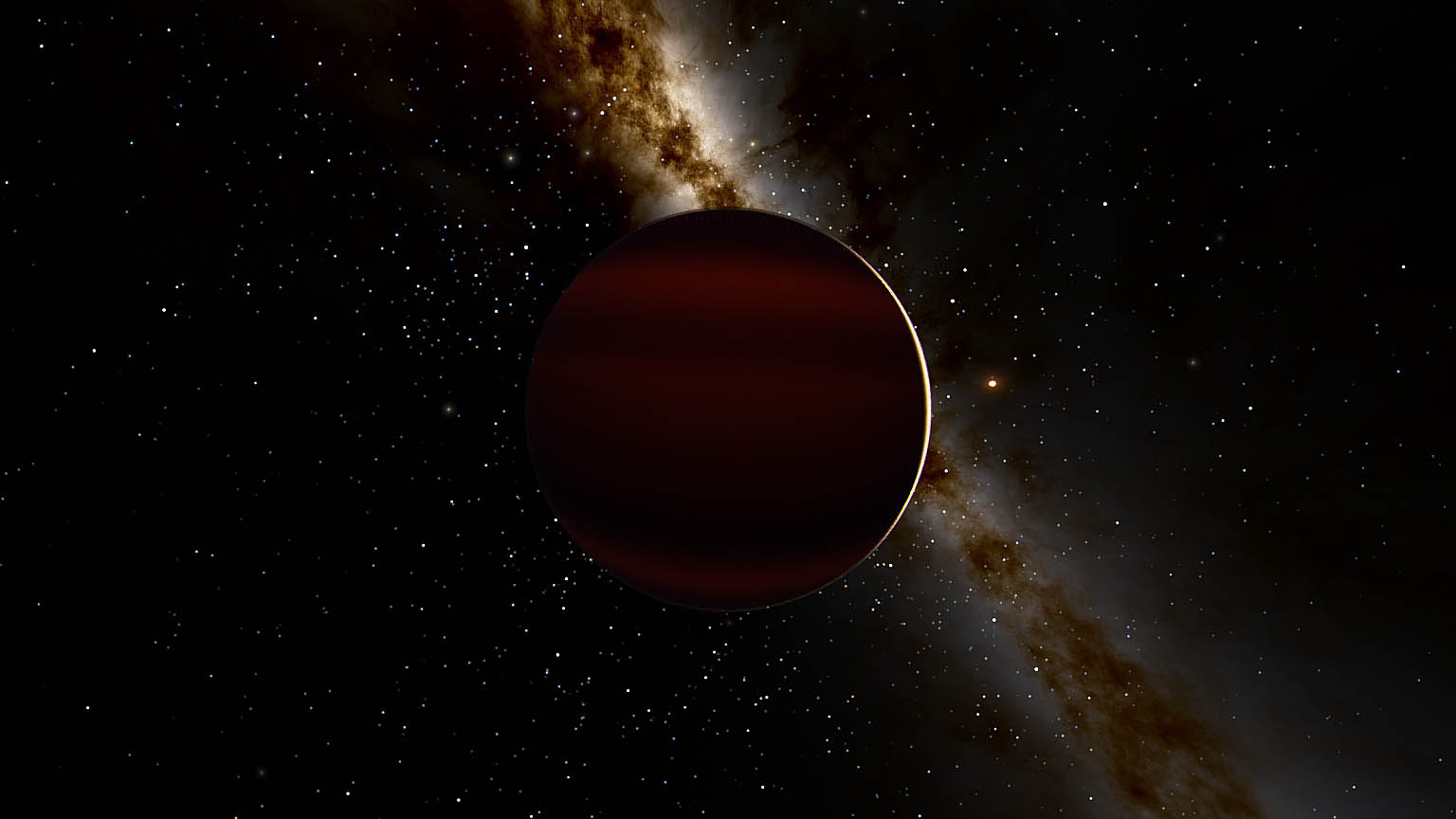
Artist's impression of the WISE 2150−7520 (W2150AB) system. The colder secondary W2150B is seen in front of the image over the Milky Way. The primary W2150A is seen as a bright star to the right of W2150B. Credit: SpaceEngine PRO, Kvasyrr

== See also ==
- LSPM J0207+3331 another object discovered by a Backyard Worlds volunteer
- UScoCTIO 108
- Luhman 16
