= HD 52265 b =

Gas giant exoplanet in the constellation Monoceros

HD 52265 b / Cayahuanca
Discovery
- Discovered by: Butler et al. and Naef et al.
- Discovery site: Keck Observatory and La Silla Observatory
- Discovery date: 2000
- Detection method: Doppler spectroscopy

Orbital characteristics
- Semi-major axis: 0.520±0.009 AU
- Eccentricity: 0.27±0.02
- Orbital period (sidereal): 119.27±0.02 d
- Argument of perihelion: 242±3 º
- Semi-amplitude: 42.97±0.70 m/s
- Star: HD 52265

Physical characteristics
- Mass: ≥1.21±0.05 M_{J}

HD 52265 b, formally named Cayahuanca, is a gas giant exoplanet located approximately 98 light-years away in the constellation of Monoceros, orbiting the star HD 52265. The planet has a minimum mass slightly more than that of Jupiter. Mean distance between the planet and the star is half that of Earth from the Sun. It was discovered by both the California and Carnegie Planet Search team and the Geneva Extrasolar Planet Search team independently of each other. By studying the fluctuations of the brightness of a host star, the inclination of the star's equator was determined. This allowed to calculate its true mass, assuming that the planet orbits in the plane of the star's equator.

== Naming ==
The planet HD 52265 b is named Cayahuanca. The name was selected in the NameExoWorlds campaign by El Salvador, during the 100th anniversary of the IAU. Cayahuanca means 'the rock looking at the stars' in the native Nahuat language.
