= Valentin Ivanov (astronomer) =

Bulgarian astronomer

Valentin D. Ivanov (Bulgarian: Валентин Д. Иванов) is a Bulgarian astronomer working in the European Southern Observatory, mainly at the Paranal site. Among his primary research areas are the dynamics of star clusters, formation of stars, brown dwarfs, and exoplanets around such objects.

Valentin Ivanov and Ray Jayawardhana are two of the pioneers of the investigation of the planemos. They discovered the extremely low low mass binary Oph 162225-240515 whose components were thought for a while to be planetary mass objects (a.k.a. planemos). This discovery came just before the debate about the 2006 planet definition, and posed the problem about the distinction between planets and brown dwarfs.

== Background ==
Valentin D. Ivanov was born in the town of Bourgas, Bulgaria in 1967. He obtained his master's degree in physics and astronomy at the University of Sofia in 1992. He earned a PhD degree at the University of Arizona, Tucson, Arizona, U.S. in 2001. He became a fellow at the European Southern Observatory, on La Silla and Cerro Paranal. In 2003-2014 he was a staff astronomer at the European Southern Observatory (ESO), Paranal where he was an instrument scientist for a number of near-infrared instruments, including SofI at the NTT, ISAAC and VISIR at the VLT, and the wide-field camera VIRCAM mounted at the VISTA (telescope). He moved to the ESO headquarters in 2015 where he is working at the science-grade data products group.

Science fiction is Valentin's hobby. He has about thirty stories appearing in Bulgaria and a few in various English language venues. His stories has been translated in German and Russian as well. In 2006, together with Kiril Dobrev, he has published a science fiction story collection in Bulgarian. His stories in English can be found in Letters to Tiptree and Life Beyond Us.
