= UPM J1040−3551 =

Quadruple star system in the constellation Antlia

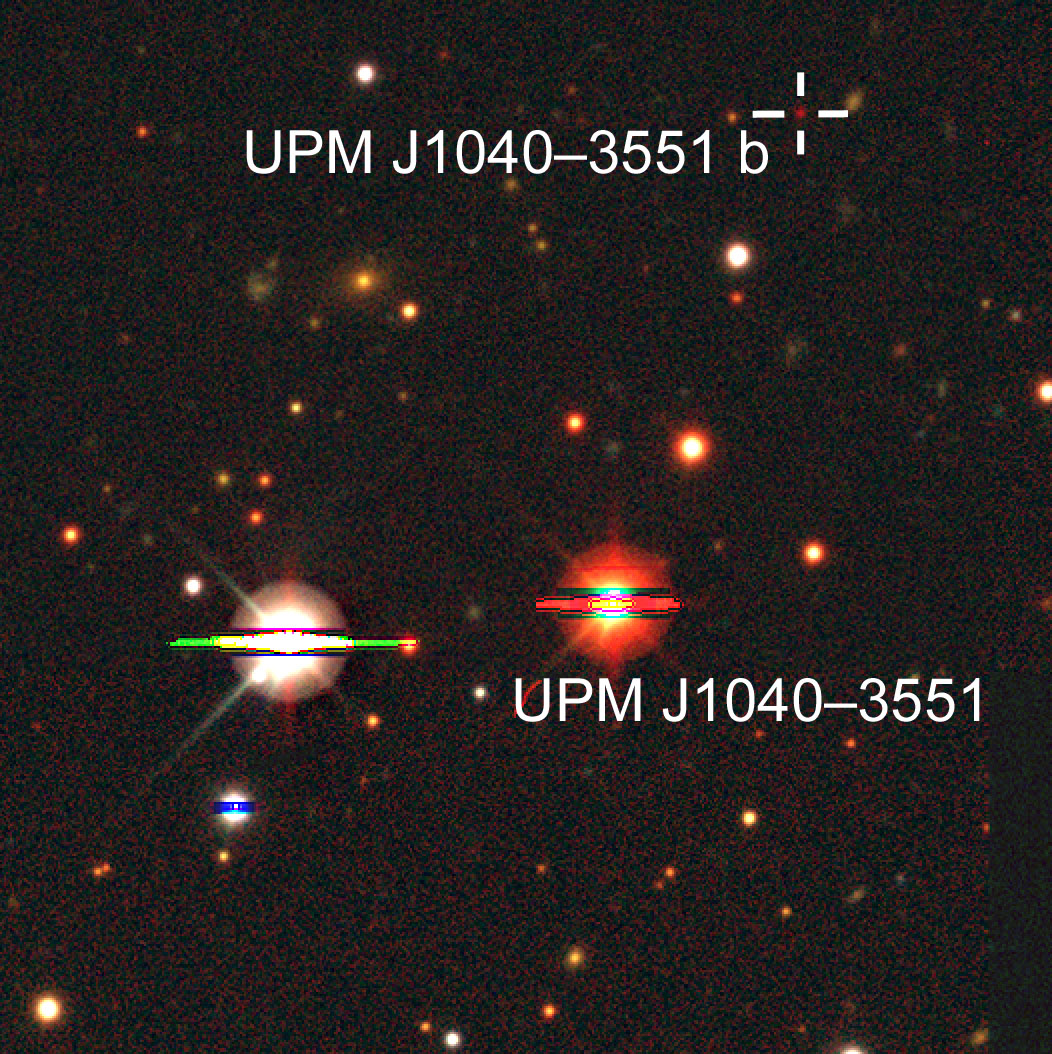
- Image of UPM J1040–3551

Observation data Epoch J2000.0 Equinox ICRS
- Constellation: Antlia
- Right ascension: 10^{h} 40^{m} 55.495^{s}
- Declination: −35° 51′ 31.15″
- Apparent magnitude (V): 14.60±0.05

Characteristics
- Evolutionary stage: Red dwarf (Aa + Ab) + Brown dwarf (Ba + Bb)
- Spectral type: M4 + M4 + T7 + T8

Astrometry
Proper motion (μ)	RA: −128.580 mas/yr Dec.: +10.646 mas/yr
Parallax (π)	39.5518±0.0197 mas
Distance	82.46 ± 0.04 ly (25.28 ± 0.01 pc)

Details

Aa
Mass	0.174±0.022 M_{☉}
Radius	0.195 R_{☉}
Temperature	3,200 K
Metallicity [Fe/H]	−0.2±0.1 dex
Age	0.2–2.0 Gyr

Ab
Mass	0.165±0.020 M_{☉}
Temperature	3,175 K
Metallicity [Fe/H]	−0.2±0.1 dex
Age	0.2–2.0 Gyr

Ba
Mass	0.012–0.040 M_{☉}
Age	0.2–2.0 Gyr

Bb
Mass	0.007–0.020 M_{☉}
Age	0.2–2.0 Gyr

Other designations
- UPM J1040-3551, WISE J104055.39-355130.9, TIC 54082379, 2MASS J10405549-3551311, UCAC4 271-055289, Gaia DR3 5443160355149610368

Database references
SIMBAD	data

UPM J1040-3551 is an exceptionally rare hierarchical quadruple stellar system discovered in 2025. It consists of a brighter pair of young red dwarf stars and a fainter pair of cold T-Type brown dwarfs. This configuration, a pair of brown dwarfs orbiting a pair of red dwarfs has never been observed before and serves as a benchmark for studying brown dwarfs, which are "failed stars" too massive to be planets but too small to sustain hydrogen fusion like normal stars. The system provides crucial insights into the formation and evolution of low-mass stellar and sub-stellar objects, as well as the mass distribution in the universe.

== Discovery ==
It was discovered using ESA's Gaia Telescope and NASA's WISE Telescope. The lead researcher are Zhenghua Zhang of Nanjing University and collaborator including Hughes Jones from University of Hertfordshire and MariCruz Gálvez-Ortiz from Center for Astrobiology.
