= HD 44594 =

Star in the constellation Puppis

Observation data Epoch J2000 Equinox ICRS
- Constellation: Puppis
- Right ascension: 06^{h} 20^{m} 06.13481^{s}
- Declination: −48° 44′ 27.9261″
- Apparent magnitude (V): 6.64

Characteristics
- Spectral type: G1.5V
- U−B color index: +0.20
- B−V color index: +0.66

Astrometry
Radial velocity (R_{v})	+59.1 km/s
Proper motion (μ)	RA: +234.059 mas/yr Dec.: −266.258 mas/yr
Parallax (π)	38.3524±0.0150 mas
Distance	85.04 ± 0.03 ly (26.07 ± 0.01 pc)
Absolute magnitude (M_{V})	4.56

Details
Mass	1.08 M_{☉}
Radius	1.2 R_{☉}
Luminosity	1.3 L_{☉}
Surface gravity (log g)	4.38 cgs
Temperature	5,840 K
Metallicity [Fe/H]	+0.15 dex
Rotational velocity (v sin i)	4.4 km/s
Age	4.1 Gyr

Other designations
- HR 2290, CD−48 2259, HD 44594, LTT 2525, SAO 217861, FK5 2486, HIP 30104

Database references
SIMBAD	data

HD 44594 is a star in the southern constellation Puppis. It has an apparent visual magnitude of 6.64, so it can be seen with the naked eye from the southern hemisphere under good viewing conditions. Based upon parallax measurements, it is located at a distance of 85 light-years (26 parsecs) from the Earth, giving it an absolute magnitude of 4.56.

Measurement of the star's spectrum show it to match a stellar classification of G1.5V, which is close to the Sun's spectral class of G2V. In the wavelength range 3,250–8,750 Â, the energy emission of this star is very similar to the Sun, and thus it is considered a solar analog. The luminosity class 'V' means this is a main sequence star that is generating energy through the thermonuclear fusion of hydrogen at its core. The effective temperature of the outer envelope of HD 44594 is 5,840 K, which is giving it the characteristic yellow hue of a G-type star.

This star has about 108% of the Sun's mass and is about the same radius as the Sun. It may be slightly younger than the Sun with an estimated age of 4.1 billion years. the abundance of elements other than hydrogen or helium, what astronomers term the star's metallicity, is 41% higher than in the Sun. The projected rotational velocity of the star is 4.4 km/s, which gives the minimum azimuthal velocity along the star's equator.

This star has been examined in the infrared using the Spitzer Space Telescope. However, no excess emission was discovered, which might otherwise have indicated the presence of a circumstellar debris disk of orbiting dust. Gaia Data Release 3 shows a faint companion about 7″ away. The companion is 9 magnitudes fainter than the G-type star with an almost-identical parallax and common proper motion.
