= HD 82943 b =

Exoplanet

Discovery
- Discovered by: Mayor, Udry et al.
- Discovery site: France
- Discovery date: April 15, 2000
- Detection method: Doppler spectroscopy

Orbital characteristics
- Semi-major axis: 1.19 AU (178,000,000 km)
- Eccentricity: 0.219
- Orbital period (sidereal): 441.2 d
- Time of periastron: 1373.1
- Argument of periastron: 284
- Semi-amplitude: 59.3 ± 5.2
- Star: HD 82943

HD 82943 b is an extrasolar planet approximately 89 light-years away in the constellation of Hydra. The planet was announced in 2000 by the Geneva Extrasolar Planet Search Team. The planet is the outermost planet of two.

== See also ==
- HD 82943 c
