= HD 82943 c =

Extrasolar planet

Discovery
- Discovered by: Mayor, Udry et al.
- Discovery site: France
- Discovery date: 2001
- Detection method: Doppler spectroscopy

Orbital characteristics
- Semi-major axis: 0.746 AU (111,600,000 km)
- Eccentricity: 0.359
- Orbital period (sidereal): 219 d
- Time of periastron: 1189.3
- Argument of periastron: 127
- Semi-amplitude: 41.7 ± 0.91
- Star: HD 82943

HD 82943 c is an extrasolar planet approximately 89 light-years away in the constellation of Hydra. The planet was announced in 2001 to be orbiting the yellow dwarf star HD 82943. The planet is the innermost planet of two.

== See also ==
- HD 82943 b
