= HD 9986 =

Star in the constellation Pisces

Observation data Epoch J2000 Equinox J2000
- Constellation: Pisces
- Right ascension: 01^{h} 37^{m} 40.87904^{s}
- Declination: +12° 04′ 42.1703″
- Apparent magnitude (V): 6.77

Characteristics
- Evolutionary stage: main sequence
- Spectral type: G2 V
- B−V color index: 0.648±0.008

Astrometry
Radial velocity (R_{v})	−20.97±0.13 km/s
Proper motion (μ)	RA: +120.372 mas/yr Dec.: +6.15 mas/yr
Parallax (π)	39.3118±0.0303 mas
Distance	82.97 ± 0.06 ly (25.44 ± 0.02 pc)
Absolute magnitude (M_{V})	4.73

Details
Mass	0.95 M_{☉}
Radius	1.1 R_{☉}
Luminosity	1.1 L_{☉}
Surface gravity (log g)	4.43±0.01 cgs
Temperature	5,831±5 K
Metallicity [Fe/H]	+0.095±0.005 dex
Rotation	23 days
Rotational velocity (v sin i)	1.90±0.15 km/s
Age	3.29±0.51 Gyr

Other designations
- BD+11°207, HD 9986, HIP 7585, SAO 92543

Database references
SIMBAD	data

HD 9986 is a Sun-like star in the equatorial constellation of Pisces. With an apparent visual magnitude of 6.77, it lies below the normal limit for visibility with the naked eye. The star is located at a distance of 83 light years from the Sun as determined from parallax measurements, but it is drifting closer with a radial velocity of −21 km/s.

This object is a G-type main-sequence star with a stellar classification of G2 V, and is a near solar twin with physical properties very similar to the Sun's. It is around 3.3 billion years old and is spinning slowly with a rotation period of about 23 days. A speckle survey of G-dwarfs by Elliott P. Horch in 2002 noted that HD 9986 may be a non-single star.
