= P Velorum =

Triple star system in the constellation Vela

p Velorum
- Location of p Velorum (circled in red)

Observation data Epoch J2000 Equinox ICRS
- Constellation: Vela
- Right ascension: 10^{h} 37^{m} 18.13995^{s}
- Declination: −48° 13′ 32.2349″
- Apparent magnitude (V): 3.83 (4.13 / 5.76)

Characteristics
- Spectral type: F3IV + F0V + A6V
- U−B color index: +0.04
- B−V color index: +0.31

Astrometry
| Radial velocity (R_{v}) | 21.20 ± 0.7 km/s |
| Proper motion (μ) | RA: -133.41 mas/yr Dec.: -1.82 mas/yr |
| Parallax (π) | 37.26±0.36 mas |
| Distance | 87.5 ± 0.8 ly (26.8 ± 0.3 pc) |
| Absolute magnitude (M_{V}) | 2.15 / 2.70 / 2.14 |

Orbit
| Primary | p Vel A |
| Name | p Vel B |
| Period (P) | 16.651 yr |
| Semi-major axis (a) | 0.361″ |
| Eccentricity (e) | 0.726 |
| Inclination (i) | 128.5° |
| Longitude of the node (Ω) | 37.2° |
| Periastron epoch (T) | 2019.562 |
| Argument of periastron (ω) (secondary) | 288.9° |

Details

p Vel Aa
| Mass | 1.88 M_{☉} |
| Radius | 2.56 (Note: Calculated, using the Stefan-Boltzmann law and the star's effective temperature and luminosity, with respect to the solar nominal effective temperature of 5,772 K: $$\sqrt{\biggl(\frac{5,772}{6,710}\biggr)^4 \cdot 12.535} = 2.56\ R_\odot.$$ $$\sqrt{\biggl(\frac{5,772}{6,740}\biggr)^4 \cdot 2.79} = 1.22\ R_\odot.$$) R_{☉} |
| Luminosity | 12.5 L_{☉} |
| Temperature | 6,710 K |

p Vel Ab
| Mass | 1.29 M_{☉} |
| Radius | 1.22 R_{☉} |
| Luminosity | 2.79 L_{☉} |
| Temperature | 6,740 K |

p Vel B
| Mass | 2.41 M_{☉} |

Other designations
- CD−47°6042, HIP 51986, HR 4167, SAO 222199
- p Vel A: HD 92139
- p Vel B: HD 92140

Database references
| SIMBAD | data |

p Velorum (abbreviated to p Vel) is a triple star system in the constellation Vela. Parallax measurements by the Hipparcos spacecraft put it at a distance of 87.5 light-years, or 26.8 parsecs from Earth. It is visible to the naked eye with a combined apparent magnitude of 3.83.

The primary component is a spectroscopic binary whose components have an orbital period of 10.21 days. The inner spectroscopic binary consists of two F-type stars, a subgiant and a main-sequence star. There is a companion star which is a white A-type main-sequence star, with an apparent magnitude of 5.76. It is separated 0.361 arcseconds from the primary and has an orbital period of 16.651 years.
