= HD 204521 =

G-type metal poor star in the constellation Cepheus

- Location of HD 204521; not visible on this chart, but just to the west of β Cephei (circled)

Observation data Epoch J2000 Equinox ICRS
- Constellation: Cepheus
- Right ascension: 21^{h} 25^{m} 16.79696^{s}
- Declination: +70° 28′ 39.1434″
- Apparent magnitude (V): 7.26

Characteristics
- Evolutionary stage: main sequence
- Spectral type: G0V
- B−V color index: 0.619±0.015

Astrometry
Radial velocity (R_{v})	−76.78±0.12 km/s
Proper motion (μ)	RA: +40.632 mas/yr Dec.: +39.411 mas/yr
Parallax (π)	37.9375±0.0155 mas
Distance	85.97 ± 0.04 ly (26.36 ± 0.01 pc)
Absolute magnitude (M_{V})	5.15

Details
Mass	0.77±0.03 or 0.997 M_{☉}
Radius	0.92 R_{☉}
Luminosity	0.76 L_{☉}
Surface gravity (log g)	4.43±0.02 cgs
Temperature	5,699±50 K
Metallicity [Fe/H]	−0.75±0.05 dex
Rotational velocity (v sin i)	3.6 km/s
Age	8.43±4.24 Gyr

Other designations
- BD+69°1169, GJ 4194, HD 204521, HIP 105766, SAO 10045, TYC 4465-1133-1

Database references
SIMBAD	data

HD 204521 is a star in the northern constellation of Cepheus. In the sky it positioned just to the west of the magnitude 3.2 star Beta Cephei (β Cep). This object has a yellow hue similar to the Sun but is too faint to be visible to the naked eye with an apparent visual magnitude of 7.26. It is located at a distance of 86 light years from the Sun based on parallax, and has an absolute magnitude of 5.15. The star is drifting closer with a radial velocity of −77 km/s, and is predicted to come to within 7.96 light-years in 334,000 years. At that distance the star can have a relatively small perturbing effect on comets in the Oort cloud.

This is an ordinary G-type main-sequence star with a stellar classification of G0V, indicating that it is generating energy through core hydrogen fusion. It is roughly 8 billion years old and appears metal-deficient. The mass of this star appears to be at or below that of the Sun, and it is radiating 76% of the Sun's luminosity from its photosphere at an effective temperature of 5,699 K.
