= HD 82943 =

Star in the constellation Hydra

Observation data Epoch J2000 Equinox ICRS
- Constellation: Hydra
- Right ascension: 09^{h} 34^{m} 50.735^{s}
- Declination: −12° 07′ 46.37″
- Apparent magnitude (V): 6.54

Characteristics
- Evolutionary stage: main sequence
- Spectral type: F9 V Fe+0.5
- B−V color index: 0.623±0.001

Astrometry
| Radial velocity (R_{v}) | 8.102±0.0003 km/s |
| Proper motion (μ) | RA: +1.440 mas/yr Dec.: −174.330 mas/yr |
| Parallax (π) | 36.1158±0.0264 mas |
| Distance | 90.31 ± 0.07 ly (27.69 ± 0.02 pc) |
| Absolute magnitude (M_{V}) | 4.35 |

Details
| Mass | 1.14±0.01 M_{☉} |
| Radius | 1.17±0.02 R_{☉} |
| Luminosity | 1.54±0.02 L_{☉} |
| Surface gravity (log g) | 4.35±0.01 cgs |
| Temperature | 5,944±18 K |
| Metallicity [Fe/H] | 0.265±0.008 dex |
| Rotation | 18.0 d |
| Rotational velocity (v sin i) | 1.35±0.5 km/s |
| Age | 3.1±0.4 Gyr |

Other designations
- 164 G. Hya, BD−11 2670, HD 82943, HIP 47007, SAO 155312

Database references
| SIMBAD | data |
| Exoplanet Archive | data |

HD 82943 (164 G. Hydrae) is a star with a pair of orbiting exoplanets in the equatorial constellation of Hydra. It has an apparent visual magnitude of 6.54, which is near the lower limit of visibility to the naked eye. Based on parallax measurements, the distance to this system is 90.3 light-years. It is drifting further away with a heliocentric radial velocity of 8.1 km/s. The star shows a high proper motion, traversing the celestial sphere at an angular rate of 0.194 arcsec yr^{−1}.

The spectrum of HD 82943 presents as an F-type main-sequence star with a stellar classification of F9 V Fe+0.5. The suffix notation indicates a mild strengthening of iron lines relative to a typical star of its type. Nonetheless, it is considered a metal-rich star, having a higher abundance of many elements with masses greater than helium as compared to the Sun. This star is around 3 billion years old and is spinning with a rotation period of 18 days. It is 14% more massive and has a 17% larger radius than the Sun. The star is radiating 154% of the luminosity of the Sun from its photosphere at an effective temperature of 5,944 K.

== Planetary system ==
The first exoplanet discovered (designated HD 82943 b) was announced in 2000 by a team of French astronomers led by Michel Mayor. The exoplanet orbits its parent star at a mean distance of 1.19 astronomical units (AU) and taking approximately 441 days to complete the orbit. Nearly a year later, a second exoplanet (designated HD 82943 c) was announced by the same discoverers of the previous planet. This exoplanet orbits closer than the other, at a mean distance of 0.746 AU and taking 219 days to complete its orbit. The two known exoplanet appear to have a 2:1 resonance with one another. Further radial velocity analysis hinted at either long-period stellar activity or presence of a third Jovian exoplanet with an orbital period of 1,075 days.

Announced in 2001, HD 82943 was found to contain an unusually high abundance of lithium-6. Upon reaching a sufficient core temperature, young stars quickly burn through their initial allotment of lithium-6, whereas planets should retain their lithium-6. Thus the simplest and most convincing answer to explain this observation is that one or more planets, or at least planetary material, have fallen into the star sometime after it passed through its early evolutionary stage.

A circumstellar debris disk was discovered in 2003, based on an infrared excess detected in the system. The inner edge of this disk orbits at a distance of 67 AU from the host star. The distance to the outer edge is poorly constrained.

The HD 82943 planetary system
| Companion (in order from star) | Mass | Semimajor axis (AU) | Orbital period (days) | Eccentricity | Inclination (°) | Radius |
|---|---|---|---|---|---|---|
| c | 14.39 M_{J} | 0.746 | 219.3 | 0.359 | — | — |
| b | 14.5 M_{J} | 1.19 | 441.2 | 0.219 | — | — |
| d (unconfirmed) | 0.29 M_{J} | 2.145 | 1078 | – | — | — |

== See also ==
- Gliese 876
- HD 169830
- Mu Arae
