= 89 Leonis =

Star in the constellation Leo

Observation data Epoch J2000.0 Equinox J2000.0 (ICRS)
- Constellation: Leo
- Right ascension: 11^{h} 34^{m} 21.94862^{s}
- Declination: +03° 03′ 36.5931″
- Apparent magnitude (V): 5.70

Characteristics
- Spectral type: F5.5V
- B−V color index: 0.480±0.005

Astrometry
Radial velocity (R_{v})	+4.775±0.0006 km/s
Proper motion (μ)	RA: −183.582 mas/yr Dec.: −102.903 mas/yr
Parallax (π)	36.9527±0.0817 mas
Distance	88.3 ± 0.2 ly (27.06 ± 0.06 pc)
Absolute magnitude (M_{V})	3.53

Details
Mass	1.29 M_{☉}
Radius	1.38±0.04 R_{☉}
Luminosity	2.990+0.009 −0.010 L_{☉}
Surface gravity (log g)	4.22 cgs
Temperature	6,461+93 −90 K
Metallicity [Fe/H]	−0.04 dex
Rotational velocity (v sin i)	15.1 km/s
Age	1.13 Gyr

Other designations
- 89 Leonis, BD+03°2521, FK5 2924, GJ 9367, HD 100563, HIP 56445, HR 4455, SAO 118929

Database references
SIMBAD	data

89 Leonis is a single star in the equatorial constellation of Leo, the lion. It has a yellow-white hue and is faintly visible to the naked eye with an apparent visual magnitude of 5.70. Based upon parallax measurements, it is located at a distance of 88 light years from the Sun. The star has a high proper motion and is moving further away with a radial velocity of +4.8 km/s. It is a candidate member of the TW Hydrae stellar kinematic group.

This is an F-type main-sequence star with a stellar classification of F5.5V. It is an estimated 1.13 billion years old and is spinning with a rotation period of 7.73 days. It shows evidence of a short-term activity cycle lasting 222.5±3.3 days. The star has 1.3 times the mass of the Sun and 1.4 times the Sun's radius. It is radiating three times the luminosity of the Sun from its photosphere at an effective temperature of 6,461 K.
