= Omega2 Tauri =

Star in the constellation Taurus

Omega^{2} Tauri
- Location of ω^{2} Tauri (circled in red)

Observation data Epoch J2000.0 Equinox J2000.0 (ICRS)
- Constellation: Taurus
- Right ascension: 04^{h} 17^{m} 15.66155^{s}
- Declination: +20° 34′ 42.9340″
- Apparent magnitude (V): +4.914

Characteristics
- Spectral type: A3m
- B−V color index: +0.259

Astrometry
Radial velocity (R_{v})	+15.0±0.6 km/s
Proper motion (μ)	RA: −39.41 mas/yr Dec.: −60.79 mas/yr
Parallax (π)	34.55±0.38 mas
Distance	94 ± 1 ly (28.9 ± 0.3 pc)
Absolute magnitude (M_{V})	+2.62

Details
Mass	1.9±0.1 M_{☉}
Radius	1.514±0.044 R_{☉}
Luminosity	6.6 L_{☉}
Temperature	7,541±137 K
Rotational velocity (v sin i)	70.1 km/s
Age	100 Myr

Other designations
- ω^{2} Tau, 50 Tau, BD+20°724, HD 27045, HIP 19990, HR 1329, SAO 76532

Database references
SIMBAD	data

Omega^{2} Tauri is a solitary, white hued star in the zodiac constellation of Taurus. It has an apparent visual magnitude of +4.9, which is bright enough to be seen with the naked eye at night. The distance to this system, as determined using an annual parallax shift of 34.55 mas as seen from the Earth, is about 94 light years. The position of this star near the ecliptic means it is subject to lunar occultation.

This is a young Am star with an age of around 100 million years and a stellar classification of A3m. It displays an infrared excess emission, indicating the presence of an orbiting debris disk with a mean temperature of 99 K. This star is a probable member of the Octans Near association, a nearby moving group of stars that share a common motion through space.
