= HD 72945 and HD 72946 =

Binary star system in the constellation of Cancer

HD 72945 & HD 72946
Observation data Epoch J2000.0 Equinox ICRS
- Constellation: Cancer
- HD 72945
- Right ascension: 08^{h} 35^{m} 50.978^{s}
- Declination: +06° 37′ 12.77″
- Apparent magnitude (V): 5.91
- HD 72946
- Right ascension: 08^{h} 35^{m} 51.267^{s}
- Declination: +06° 37′ 21.95″
- Apparent magnitude (V): 7.25

Characteristics

HD 72945
- Evolutionary stage: Main sequence
- Spectral type: F8 V
- B−V color index: 0.530±0.007

HD 72946
- Evolutionary stage: main sequence
- Spectral type: G5V
- B−V color index: 0.710±0.015

Astrometry

HD 72945
Radial velocity (R_{v})	26.61±0.15 km/s
Proper motion (μ)	RA: −130.308 mas/yr Dec.: −133.119 mas/yr
Parallax (π)	38.4212±0.1515 mas
Distance	84.9 ± 0.3 ly (26.0 ± 0.1 pc)
Absolute magnitude (M_{V})	3.91

HD 72946
Radial velocity (R_{v})	28.70±0.12 km/s
Proper motion (μ)	RA: −136.593 mas/yr Dec.: −137.148 mas/yr
Parallax (π)	38.9809±0.0412 mas
Distance	83.67 ± 0.09 ly (25.65 ± 0.03 pc)
Absolute magnitude (M_{V})	5.16

Orbit
Primary	HD 72945 A
Period (P)	14.2995±0.0001 d
Semi-major axis (a)	≥4.07 ± 0.05 Gm (5.850 ± 0.072 R_{☉})
Eccentricity (e)	0.332±0.008
Periastron epoch (T)	2,446,781.30±0.12 JD
Argument of periastron (ω) (secondary)	227.1±3.0°
Semi-amplitude (K_{1}) (primary)	21.95±0.15 km/s

Details

HD 72945
Mass	1.245±0.030 M_{☉}
Radius	1.358 R_{☉}
Luminosity	2.372 L_{☉}
Surface gravity (log g)	4.32 cgs
Temperature	6,222 K
Metallicity [Fe/H]	0.05 dex
Rotational velocity (v sin i)	7.1 km/s
Age	1.584±0.952 Gyr

HD 72946
Mass	1.02±0.04 M_{☉}
Radius	0.97±0.02 R_{☉}
Luminosity	0.84 L_{☉}
Surface gravity (log g)	4.69 cgs
Temperature	5,670 K
Metallicity [Fe/H]	0.16 dex
Rotational velocity (v sin i)	4.14 km/s
Age	1.9^{+0.6}_{−0.5} Gyr

Other designations
- BD+07 1997, GJ 310.1, GJ 9271, ADS 6886, WDS J08358+0637, STF 1245
- HD 72945: Boss 2285, GC 11781, HIP 42172, HR 3395, SAO 116929, PPM 154707, NLTT 19856
- HD 72946: Boss 2286, GC 16412, HIP 42173, HR 3396, SAO 116931, PPM 154708, NLTT 19851

Database references
SIMBAD	HD 72945
- HD 72946

HD 72945 and HD 72946 form a co-moving star system in the northern constellation of Cancer. HD 72945 is a binary star that is dimly visible to the naked eye as a point of light with an apparent visual magnitude of 5.91. At an angular separation of 10.10″ (as of 2020) is the fainter companion star HD 72946 at magnitude 7.25. It is being orbited by a brown dwarf. The system as a whole is located at a distance of approximately 84 light years from the Sun based on parallax measurements.

The discovery of this double star was announced by F. G. W. Struve in 1782, and later given the discovery code STF 1245. Their common proper motion was confirmed by A. van Maanen in 1916, and this suggested they are physically associated. The projected separation of the two systems is 258.9 AU. Based on astrometric measurements from the Gaia spacecraft, the semimajor axis of this system is 200+52
−41 AU. Assuming they are gravitationally bound, they would have an orbital period of around 2,500 years.

There is an additional candidate stellar companion at an angular separation of ~130″, which would make this a four star system. (This object has the 2MASS designation J08354678+0635294.) Three additional faint companions detected by Struve are most likely background stars.

== HD 72945 ==
The binary nature of HD 72945 was announced in 1919 by A. H. Joy and G. Abetti at the Mount Wilson Observatory. Observed variations in the radial velocity of the primary component inferred an orbiting stellar companion. This is a single-lined spectroscopic binary system with a period of 14.3 days and an orbital eccentricity of 0.33. The minimum value for the semimajor axis is only 5.9 times the radius of the Sun, although the actual value is uncertain because the orbital inclination is unknown.

The visible component of this system has a stellar classification of F8 V, matching an ordinary F-type main-sequence star. It has 1.25 times the mass of the Sun and 1.4 times the Sun's radius. The star is radiating 2.4 times the luminosity of the Sun from its photosphere at an effective temperature of 6,222 K. It has an estimated age of approximately 1.6 billion years. The derived minimum mass for the secondary component is 0.34 M_{☉}.

== HD 72946 ==
This is a G-type main-sequence star with a class of G5V. It has about the same size and mass as the Sun. However, the star is slightly more active than the Sun, and thus probably younger. It is metal-rich, showing a higher abundance of elements other than hydrogen and helium compared to the Sun.

In 2016, a candidate brown dwarf companion in orbit around HD 72946 was announced. It was discovered based on radial velocity monitoring over a twenty-year period. The companion was confirmed in 2020. It has a classification of L5.0±1.5, a derived temperature of 1,700±90 K, and a mass near the hydrogen-burning limit. The orbit lies just outside the ice line of the host star, with a semimajor axis of about 6.5 AU. It is orbiting with a period of 16 years and an eccentricity of 0.498.

The HD 72945 and HD 72946 planetary system
Companion (in order from star)	Mass	Semimajor axis (AU)	Orbital period (days)	Eccentricity	Inclination (°)	Radius
B	69.5±0.5 M_{J}	6.492	5,815 ± 37	0.498	1.102	—
