= HD 194012 =

Star in the constellation Delphinus

Observation data Epoch J2000.0 Equinox ICRS
- Constellation: Delphinus
- Right ascension: 20^{h} 22^{m} 52.3692^{s}
- Declination: +14° 33′ 03.951″
- Apparent magnitude (V): 6.15±0.01

Characteristics
- Evolutionary stage: main sequence
- Spectral type: F7 V
- U−B color index: −0.07
- B−V color index: +0.51

Astrometry
Radial velocity (R_{v})	4.5±0.2 km/s
Proper motion (μ)	RA: +78.997 mas/yr Dec.: −7.143 mas/yr
Parallax (π)	38.4009±0.0233 mas
Distance	84.93 ± 0.05 ly (26.04 ± 0.02 pc)
Absolute magnitude (M_{V})	+4.06

Details
Mass	1.21^{+0.19}_{−0.16} M_{☉}
Radius	1.18±0.04 R_{☉}
Luminosity	1.9 L_{☉}
Surface gravity (log g)	4.36 cgs
Temperature	6,301±80 K
Metallicity [Fe/H]	−0.06 dex
Rotational velocity (v sin i)	5 km/s
Age	1.06 Gyr

Other designations
- AG+14°2196, BD+14°4275, GC 28343, GJ 789, HD 194012, HIP 100511, HR 7793, SAO 106042

Database references
SIMBAD	data

HD 194012 (HR 7793; Gliese 789) is a star in the equatorial constellation Delphinus. It has an apparent magnitude of 6.15, making it visible to the naked eye under ideal conditions. The star is relatively close at a distance of only 85 light years but is receding with a heliocentric radial velocity of 4.5 km/s.

HD 194012 has a stellar classification of F7 V, indicating that it is an ordinary F-type main-sequence star. It has 121% the mass of the Sun and is estimated to be a billion years old, spinning with a projected rotational velocity of 5 km/s. The star's diameter is 118% that of the Sun and shines with a luminosity of 1.9 L_{☉} from its photosphere at an effective temperature of 6,301 K, giving a yellow white hue. HD 194012's metallicity is calculated to be 87% that of the Sun.

A 2010 paper has identified a candidate substellar companion 12.78″ away along a position angle of 67.9°. HD 194012 has been examined for infrared excess suggesting a debris disk but none was found.
