= HD 52265 =

Star in the constellation Monoceros

HD 52265 / Citalá
- Location of HD 52265 (circled in red)

Observation data Epoch J2000.0 Equinox ICRS
- Constellation: Monoceros
- Right ascension: 07^{h} 00^{m} 18.036^{s}
- Declination: −05° 22′ 01.78″
- Apparent magnitude (V): 6.29

Characteristics
- Evolutionary stage: main sequence
- Spectral type: G0 V
- B−V color index: 0.572±0.003
- Variable type: None

Astrometry
Radial velocity (R_{v})	53.86±0.09 km/s
Proper motion (μ)	RA: −116.513 mas/yr Dec.: 80.633 mas/yr
Parallax (π)	33.425±0.0223 mas
Distance	97.58 ± 0.07 ly (29.92 ± 0.02 pc)
Absolute magnitude (M_{V})	3.98

Details
Mass	1.21±0.02 M_{☉}
Radius	1.27±0.03 R_{☉}
Luminosity	2.08±0.01 L_{☉}
Surface gravity (log g)	4.31±0.03 cgs
Temperature	6,163±41 K
Metallicity [Fe/H]	+0.11 dex
Rotation	12.3±0.15 d
Rotational velocity (v sin i)	3.6^{+0.3}_{−1.0} km/s
Age	2.6±0.6 Gyr

Other designations
- Citalá, BD−05°1910, HD 52265, HIP 33719, HR 2622, SAO 134031

Database references
SIMBAD	data
Exoplanet Archive	data

HD 52265, also named Citalá, is a star with an orbiting exoplanet companion in the equatorial constellation of Monoceros. It is dimly visible to the naked eye with an apparent visual magnitude of 6.29. The star is located at a distance of 98 light-years based on parallax measurements, and is drifting further away with a heliocentric radial velocity of 54 km/s.

== Naming ==
It was given the proper name Citalá, meaning 'river of stars' in the native Nahuat (Pipil) language. The name was selected in the NameExoWorlds campaign by El Salvador, during the 100th anniversary of the IAU.

== Characteristics ==
It is a G-type main-sequence star with a stellar classification of G0 V. It is 21% more massive than the Sun and is 27% larger in radius. The star is 2.6 billion years old, and is spinning with a rotation period of 12.3 days. It is radiating more than double the luminosity of the Sun from its photosphere at an effective temperature of 6,163 K. The level of chromospheric activity is similar to the Sun.

== Planetary system ==
In 2000 the California and Carnegie Planet Search team announced the discovery of an extrasolar planet orbiting the star. It was independently discovered by the Geneva Extrasolar Planet Search team. The planet has since been designated Cayahuanca by the IAU, which means 'the rock' in Nahuat. A possible two-planet model was proposed in 2013, but was not supported by follow-up studies.

The HD 52265 planetary system
Companion (in order from star)	Mass	Semimajor axis (AU)	Orbital period (days)	Eccentricity	Inclination (°)	Radius
b / Cayahuanca	≥1.21±0.05 M_{J}	0.520±0.009	119.27±0.02	0.27±0.02	—	—

== See also ==
- List of extrasolar planets
