= 113 Herculis =

Binary star in the constellation Hercules

- Location of 113 Herculis (circled in red)

Observation data Epoch J2000.0 Equinox ICRS
- Constellation: Hercules
- Right ascension: 18^{h} 54^{m} 44.88499^{s}
- Declination: +22° 38′ 42.2715″
- Apparent magnitude (V): 4.57

Characteristics

Giant
- Evolutionary stage: Red clump
- Spectral type: G8III+

Main sequence
- Evolutionary stage: Main Sequence
- Spectral type: A0.5

Astrometry
| Radial velocity (R_{v}) | −21.94±1.84 km/s |
| Proper motion (μ) | RA: +6.571 mas/yr Dec.: +1.305 mas/yr |
| Parallax (π) | 7.5501±0.2067 mas |
| Distance | 430 ± 10 ly (132 ± 4 pc) |
| Absolute magnitude (M_{V}) | −1.23 |

Orbit
| Period (P) | 245.325±0.006 days |
| Semi-major axis (a) | 0.0101±0.0001″ |
| Eccentricity (e) | 0.101±0.005 |
| Inclination (i) | 40.2±0.6° |
| Longitude of the node (Ω) | 70.1±1.2° |
| Periastron epoch (T) | 2447784.1±0.8 JD |
| Argument of periastron (ω) (secondary) | 186.7±2.0° |
| Semi-amplitude (K_{1}) (primary) | 15.48±0.09 km/s |
| Semi-amplitude (K_{2}) (secondary) | 22.58±0.30 km/s |

Details

A
| Mass | 3.045 M_{☉} |
| Radius | 22.2 R_{☉} |
| Temperature | 5047 K |
| Age | 390.9 Myr |

B
| Mass | 2.087 M_{☉} |
| Radius | 2.05 R_{☉} |
| Temperature | 9506 K |
| Age | 390.9 Myr |

Other designations
- 113 Her, BD+22 3524, GC 25954, HD 175492, HD 175493, HIP 92818, HR 7133, SAO 86567, PPM 108046, ADS 11820, TYC 2109-2837-1, IRAS 18526+2234

Database references
| SIMBAD | data |

113 Herculis is a binary star system located about 430 light-years (130 parsecs) away in the constellation Hercules. With an apparent magnitude of 4.6, it is faintly visible to the naked eye.

This star was first discovered to be a spectroscopic binary in 1900 by W. W. Campbell and W. H. Wright. The two stars orbit with a period of 245.3 days.

== Charecterstics ==
113 Herculis is a spectroscopic double-line binary with an orbital period of 245.33 days and an eccentricity of 0.10. The system is estimated to be 391 million years old. It contains an evolved primary star, designated 113 Herculis Aa, and generally classified as a G-type yellow giant. It is a red clump star, meaning that it generates its energy by the fusion of helium in its core. It is estimated to be 3.15 times more massive than the Sun and its radius is nearly 24 times larger than the Sun's radius. Its surface temperature is 4,775 K. The Secondary component, 113 Herculis Ab, is a white main-sequence star of type A0 to A8. It is 2.18 times more massive than the Sun and its radius is 2.1 times larger than the solar radius. Its surface temperature is 9,183 K.

Double and multiple star catalogs list two visual companions of magnitude 11.1 near 113 Herculis. Designated B and C, they were located at 34.4 and 36.9 arcseconds respectively from 113 Herculis A in 2001. Eggleton & Tokovinin (2008) proposed that these two stars are physically bound to the system, but measurements of their annual parallaxes of components B and C by the Gaia satellite show that they are much more distant, at distances of about 590 parsecs (1,900 ly) and about 4 kiloparsecs (13 kly) respectively.
