= HD 49933 =

Binary star system in the constellation Monoceros

Observation data Epoch J2000 Equinox ICRS
- Constellation: Monoceros
- Right ascension: 06^{h} 50^{m} 49.83180^{s}
- Declination: −00° 32′ 27.1701″
- Apparent magnitude (V): 5.781

Characteristics

HD 49933 A
- Spectral type: F2 V
- U−B color index: −0.07
- B−V color index: +0.39

HD 49933 B
- Spectral type: M0

Astrometry
Radial velocity (R_{v})	−14.7 km/s
Proper motion (μ)	RA: +22.09 mas/yr Dec.: −186.51 mas/yr
Parallax (π)	33.69±0.42 mas
Distance	97 ± 1 ly (29.7 ± 0.4 pc)
Absolute magnitude (M_{V})	3.42

Position (relative to HD 49933 A)
Component	HD 49933 B
Epoch of observation	2016
Angular distance	6.5″
Position angle	23°
Projected separation	190 AU

Details
Mass	1.079±0.073 M_{☉}
Radius	1.385±0.031 R_{☉}
Luminosity	3.47±0.18 L_{☉}
Surface gravity (log g)	4.08 cgs
Temperature	6,598 K
Metallicity [Fe/H]	−0.29 dex
Rotational velocity (v sin i)	10 km/s
Age	2.4 Gyr

Other designations
- BD−00°1462, HD 49933, HIP 32851, HR 2530, SAO 133760

Database references
SIMBAD	data

HD 49933 (HR 2530) is a binary star system in the equatorial constellation of Monoceros, the unicorn. The HD designation indicates the identifier of the star found in the Henry Draper catalogue. At an apparent magnitude of 5.8, this star can just be seen with the naked eye under suitably dark conditions. Based upon parallax measurements from the Hipparcos mission, the distance to HD 49933 is about 97 light-years (30 parsecs) with a 1% margin of error.

== HD 49933 A ==
Its primary HD 49933 A is a Sun-like star. This is an F-type main sequence star with a stellar classification of F2 V, where the luminosity class V indicates that it is generating energy through the nuclear fusion of hydrogen at its core. It is slightly larger than the Sun, with 108% of the Sun's mass and 139% of the Sun's radius. HD 49933 A emits 3.47 times as much energy as the Sun from its outer atmosphere at a higher effective temperature of about 6,598 K, giving it the yellow-white hue of an F-type star. It is estimated to be 2.4 billion years old.

The surface magnetic activity on this star is similar to what is observed on the Sun. Magnetic features on the surface have been detected using asteroseismology that appear to be starspots (the stellar equivalent to sunspots on the Sun).

== HD 49933 B ==
In 2008 it was discovered the primary star has an 11.3 magnitude common proper motion companion at an angular separation of 5.9 arcseconds, which may make this a binary star system if the pair are gravitationally bound. In 2016, it was confirmed that HD 49933 A is orbited by a red dwarf star of spectral class M0.
