= 2MASS J11011926−7732383 =

Brown dwarf in the constellation Chamaleon

2MASS J11011926–7732383 AB
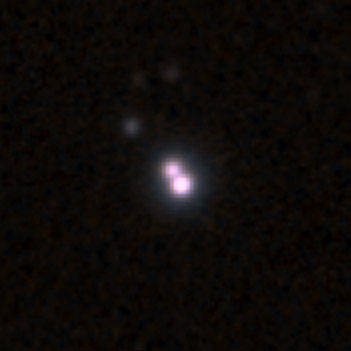
- 2M1101A is on the lower right and 2M1101B is the object on the upper left. Credit: ESO VHS

Observation data Epoch J2000 Equinox ICRS
- Constellation: Chamaeleon
- Right ascension: 11^{h} 01^{m} 19.198^{s}
- Declination: −77° 32′ 38.76″

Astrometry

A
Proper motion (μ)	RA: −22.653±0.435 mas/yr Dec.: +2.062±0.397 mas/yr
Parallax (π)	5.4081±0.1877 mas
Distance	600 ± 20 ly (185 ± 6 pc)

Other designations
- 2MASS J11011926–7732383, WDS J11013-7733AB, LUH 1

Database references
SIMBAD	data

2MASS J11011926–7732383 AB (abbreviated 2M1101AB; LUH 1) is a brown dwarf binary about 600 light-years distant in the constellation Chamaeleon. The wide binary pair is separated by about 240 astronomical units. The system was the first discovery of a brown dwarf binary with a separation greater than 20 au. The discovery gave fundamental insights into the formation of brown dwarfs. Previously it was thought that such wide binary brown dwarfs are not formed or at least are disrupted at ages of 1-10 Myrs. Together with other wide binaries, such as Oph 162225-240515 or UScoCTIO 108, the existence of this system was inconsistent with the ejection hypothesis, a proposed hypothesis in which brown dwarfs form in a multiple system, but are ejected before they gain enough mass to burn hydrogen. The ejection hypothesis predicted a maximum separation of 10 au for brown dwarf binaries.

The system was discovered by Kevin Luhman in 2004 during observations of candidate young brown dwarfs in Chamaeleon I, using the Magellan I telescope.

The primary 2M1101A has a spectral type of M7.25 ± 0.25, with a mass of about 52 M_{J} and a temperature of 2838 K (2565 °C; 4649 °F). The secondary 2M1101B has a spectral type of M8.25 ± 0.25, with a mass of about 26 M_{J} and a temperature of 2632 K (2359 °C; 4279 °F). Based on spectral features, such as sodium and potassium absorption lines it was concluded that both brown dwarfs are young and part of Chamaeleon I. The brown dwarfs in 2M1101AB belong to the youngest substellar members of Chamaeleon I with an approximate age of 1 million years. Measurements by ESA's Gaia satellite show a similar parallax and proper motion for both brown dwarfs. The system has a relatively low binding energy of $0.91 \times 10^{41}$ ergs.

The system was detected in x-rays with Chandra and XMM-Newton. While XMM-Newton could not resolve the binary it detected the primary. Chandra resolved the binary and detected the secondary in the system. These apparently contradictory results were interpreted as strong variability of the x-ray emissions by this system.

== See also ==
- SDSS J1416+1348
- UScoCTIO 108
- Oph 162225-240515
- Binary brown dwarfs
- W2150AB
