= 111 Herculis =

Star in the constellation Hercules

- Location of 111 Herculis (circled in red)

Observation data Epoch J2000 Equinox ICRS
- Constellation: Hercules
- Right ascension: 18^{h} 47^{m} 01.23431^{s}
- Declination: +21° 46′ 53.4578″
- Apparent magnitude (V): 4.34

Characteristics
- Evolutionary stage: main sequence
- Spectral type: A3Va+
- B−V color index: 0.148±0.003

Astrometry
Radial velocity (R_{v})	−44.6±2.7 km/s
Proper motion (μ)	RA: +98.835 mas/yr Dec.: +115.120 mas/yr
Parallax (π)	34.9987±0.1743 mas
Distance	93.2 ± 0.5 ly (28.6 ± 0.1 pc)
Absolute magnitude (M_{V})	2.04

Details
Mass	2.40 M_{☉}
Radius	1.6 R_{☉}
Luminosity	12.84 L_{☉}
Surface gravity (log g)	4.35 cgs
Temperature	8,873±302 K
Metallicity [Fe/H]	0.33 dex
Rotational velocity (v sin i)	71 km/s
Age	559 Myr

Other designations
- 111 Her, BD+18°3823, FK5 1491, HD 173880, HIP 92161, HR 7069, SAO 104093, WDS J18470+1811

Database references
SIMBAD	data

111 Herculis is a suspected astrometric binary star system located 92 light years from the Sun in the northern constellation Hercules. It is visible to the naked eye as a faint, white-hued point of light with an apparent visual magnitude of 4.34. The system is moving nearer to the Earth with a heliocentric radial velocity of −45 km/s, and may come as close as 37 light-years in 537,000 years.

According to Garrison (1989), the visible component has a spectral classification if A3Va+, indicating an A-type main sequence star. Other authors have published classes of A5III, matching an A-type giant star, and A3IV, suggesting it is instead a subgiant star. Models of the star's evolution suggest that it is still on the main sequence.

The interferometry-measured angular diameter of the primary component is 0.52±0.02 mas, which, at its estimated distance, equates to a physical radius of roughly 1.6 times the radius of the Sun. The star is estimated to be 559 million years old with 2.40 times the mass of the Sun and is spinning with a projected rotational velocity of 71 km/s. It is radiating 13 times the Sun's luminosity from its photosphere at an effective temperature of 8,873 K.
