= Oph 162225-240515 =

Brown dwarf binary in the constellation Scorpius

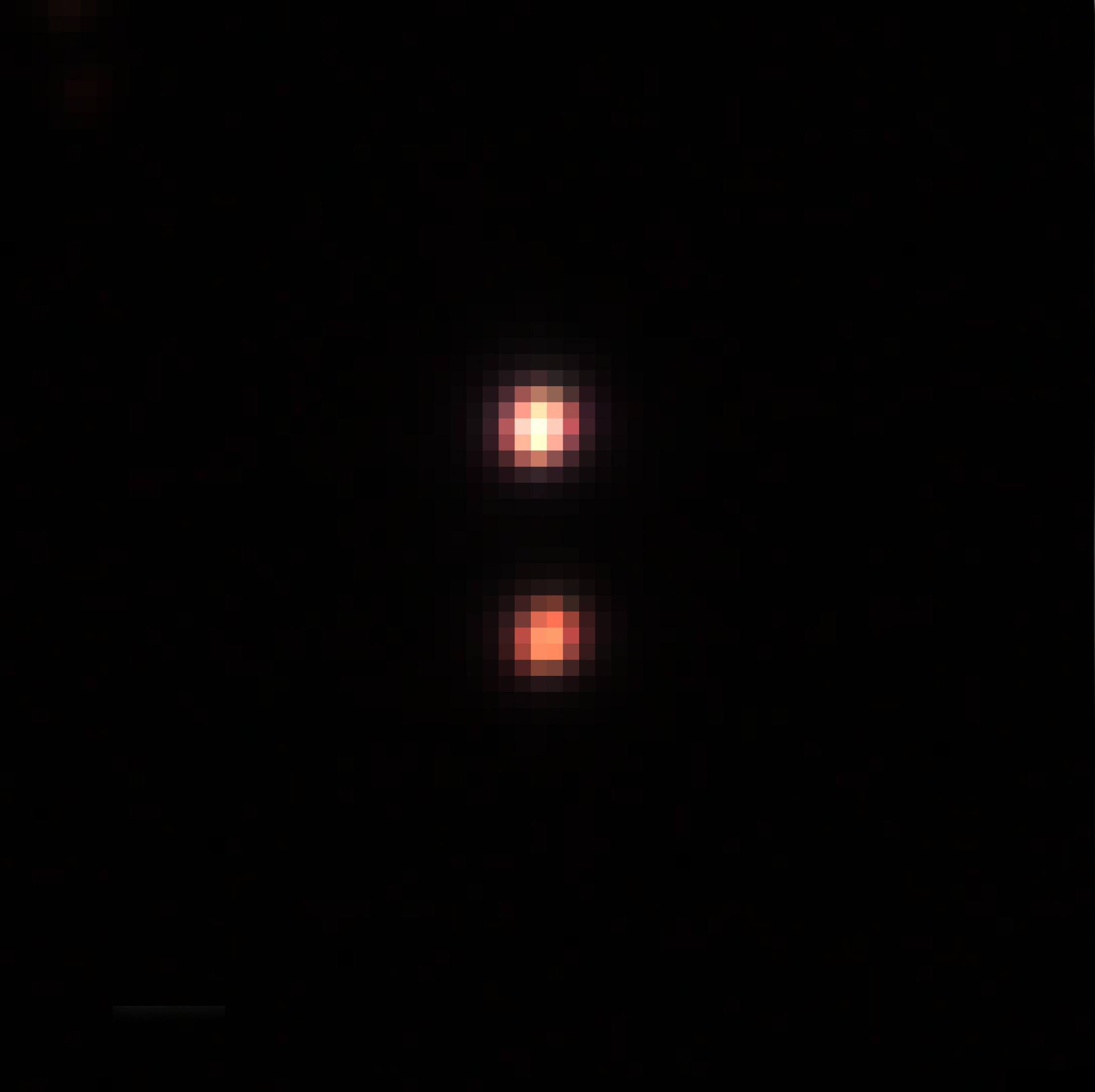
- Near-infrared image of the Oph 1622 binary system taken by the Very Large Telescope; Credit: ESO

Observation data Epoch J2000 Equinox ICRS
- Constellation: Scorpius
- A
- Right ascension: 16^{h} 22^{m} 25.209^{s}
- Declination: −24° 05′ 13.62″
- B
- Right ascension: 16^{h} 22^{m} 25.214^{s}
- Declination: −24° 05′ 15.57″

Astrometry

A
Proper motion (μ)	RA: −15.985 mas/yr Dec.: −24.607 mas/yr
Parallax (π)	7.5963±0.2891 mas
Distance	430 ± 20 ly (132 ± 5 pc)

B
Proper motion (μ)	RA: −15.934 mas/yr Dec.: −24.245 mas/yr
Parallax (π)	7.4979±0.8075 mas
Distance	approx. 430 ly (approx. 130 pc)

Other designations
- 2MASS J16222521-2405139

Database references
SIMBAD	Oph 1622
- Oph 1622 A
- Oph 1622 B

Oph 162225-240515, often abbreviated Oph 1622, and also known as Oph 11, is a pair of brown dwarfs that have been reported as orbiting each other. The bodies are located in the constellation Scorpius and are about 430 light years away. Mass estimates of the two objects are uncertain, but they are probably each higher than the brown-dwarf/planet dividing line of 13 Jupiter masses. Oph1622B is located 1.94 arcseconds from Oph1622A, at a position angle of 182°.

The discovery of the pair was announced in a 2006 Science article by Ray Jayawardhana and Valentin D. Ivanov . The objects were discovered using telescopes of the European Southern Observatory's New Technology Telescope in La Silla, Chile. The masses were originally reported to be lower, at 14 and 7 Jupiter masses, which would have made the smaller object a planetary-mass object, or planemo. The system was announced as the first reported binary system of objects this small. However, later observations and calculations have revised the masses upward. Close et al. estimate the mass of the primary, designated Oph1622A as 12–21 times that of Jupiter and 9–20 Jupiter masses for the less massive Oph1622B, while Luhman et al. assign values of 57 and 20 Jupiter masses. Despite the acronym "Oph" appearing in its name (implying that it may belong to the young Ophiuchus molecular cloud), Oph1622 is likely to be older than its originally adopted age of 1 million years. More likely, it is a member of the Upper Scorpius subgroup of the Scorpius–Centaurus association, which has an age of 11 million years. For an adopted age of 11 million years, the system has inferred masses of 53 and 21 Jupiter masses, similar to that derived by Luhman et al.

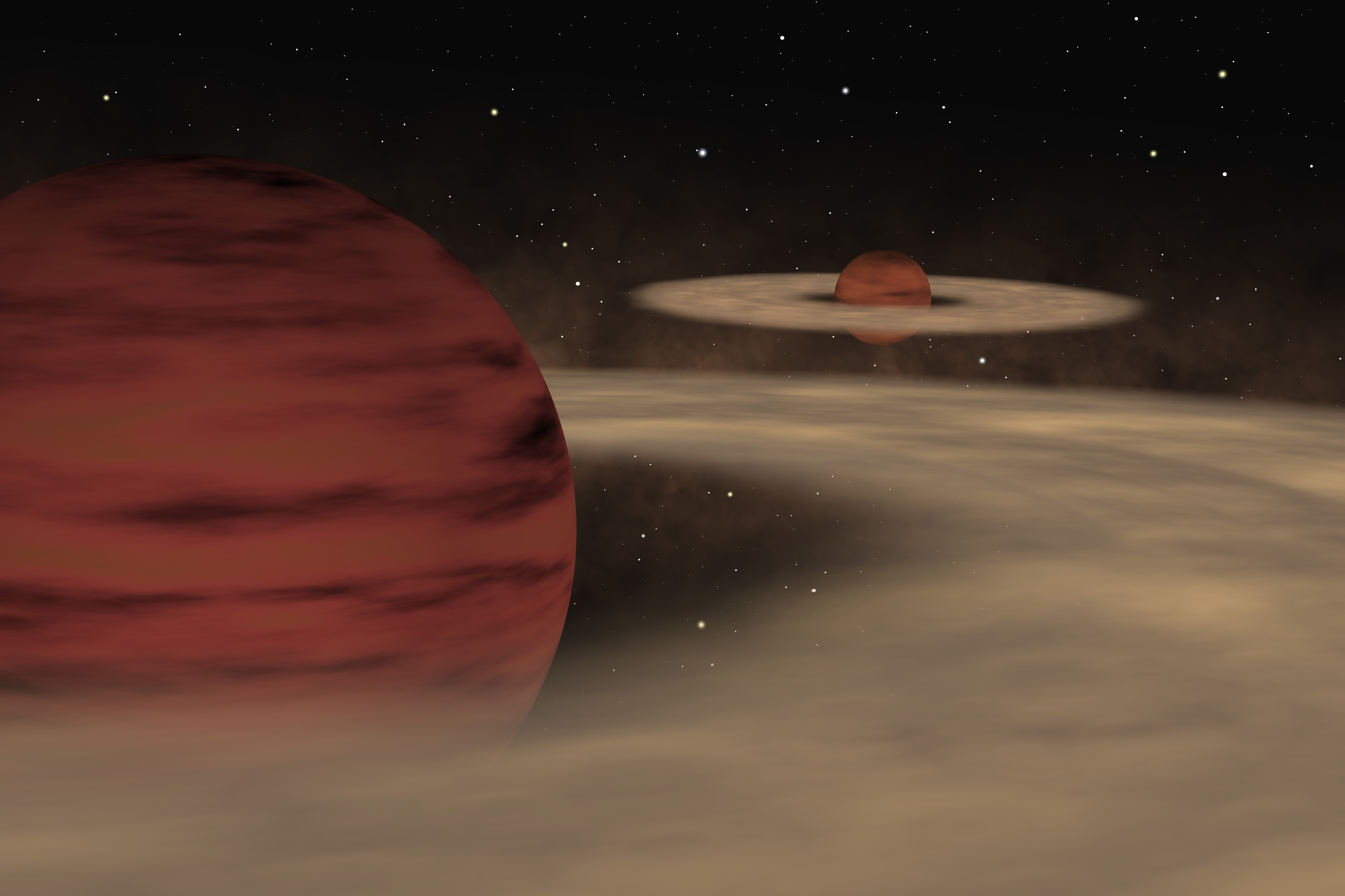
Artist's impression of Oph 1622 system with protoplanetary discs

The distance between the two is approximately 240 AU—a distance so great that Space.com wrote that "their connection is so tenuous ... that a passing star or brown dwarf could permanently separate the two objects." As such, the discovery was reported as casting doubt on the theory that such free-floating planet-like objects have been ejected from a stellar system, such an event being too violent to leave them in such a wide orbit around each other. Given their wide separation and high masses, the system is best thought of as a wide brown dwarf binary rather than a binary planetary system.

The Oph 162225-240515 system
Companion	Mass	Observed separation (AU)
B	21±3 M_{J}	~280

== See also ==
- 2M1101AB
- UScoCTIO 108
- SDSS J1416+1348
- Binary brown dwarfs
