= SDSS J141624.08+134826.7 =

Wide binary system in the constellation Bootes

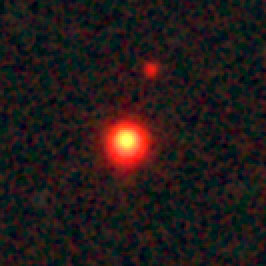
- SDSS J1416+1348 A (bright object) and SDSS J1416+1348 B (faint red object above); Credit: legacy surveys

Observation data Epoch J2000 Equinox ICRS
- Constellation: Boötes
- Right ascension: 14^{h} 16^{m} 24.0740^{s}
- Declination: +13° 48′ 26.193″

Characteristics

A
- Spectral type: sdL7
- Apparent magnitude (r): 20.69±0.04
- Apparent magnitude (i): 18.38±0.01
- Apparent magnitude (z): 15.92±0.01
- Apparent magnitude (Y): 14.255±0.003
- Apparent magnitude (J): 12.995±0.001
- Apparent magnitude (H): 12.469±0.001
- Apparent magnitude (K_{S}): 12.053±0.001
- R−I color index: 2.31±0.04
- J−H color index: 0.55±0.01
- J−K color index: 1.03±0.03

B
- Spectral type: T7.5p
- Apparent magnitude (Y): 18.16±0.02
- Apparent magnitude (J): 17.259±0.017
- Apparent magnitude (H): 17.62±0.02
- Apparent magnitude (K_{S}): 18.93±0.17
- J−H color index: −0.3
- J−K color index: −1.7

Astrometry
Radial velocity (R_{v})	−42.2±5.1 km/s
Proper motion (μ)	RA: 86.670±0.291 mas/yr Dec.: 127.953±0.198 mas/yr
Parallax (π)	107.7375±0.2163 mas
Distance	30.27 ± 0.06 ly (9.28 ± 0.02 pc)

Orbit
Primary	A
Name	B
Semi-major axis (a)	104^{+28}_{−72} AU

Details

Component A
Mass	60±18 M_{Jup}
Radius	0.92±0.08 R_{Jup}
Luminosity (bolometric)	log(−4.18±0.011) L_{☉}
Surface gravity (log g)	5.22±0.22 cgs
Temperature	1694±74 K
Age	0.5–10 Gyr

Component B
Mass	33±22 M_{Jup}
Radius	0.94±0.16 R_{Jup}
Luminosity (bolometric)	log(−5.80±0.07) L_{☉}
Surface gravity (log g)	4.82±0.51 cgs
Temperature	660±62 K
Age	0.5–10 Gyr

Position (relative to A)
Component	B
Angular distance	9.81″
Projected separation	89.3±1.5 AU

Other designations
- Component A: SDSS J141624.08+134826.7, SDSS J1416+1348, SDSS J1416+13A, SDSS J1416+13, SDSS 1416+13, SDSS 141624, 2MASS J14162408+1348263, SOZ 3A, WDS J14164+1348A
- Component B: ULAS J141623.94+134836.30, ULAS J141623.94+134836.3, SDSS J141624.08+134826.7B, ULAS J1416+1348, SDSS J1416+1348B, ULAS J1416+13, SDSS J1416+13B, SDSS 141624 b, WISE J141623.94+134836.0, SOZ 3B, WDS J14164+1348B

Database references
SIMBAD	data

SDSS J141624.08+134826.7 (abbreviated SDSS J1416+1348) is a nearby wide binary system of two brown dwarfs, located in constellation Boötes. The system consists of L-type component A and T-type component B.

== Discovery ==
Component A was discovered in late 2009 (Note: Date of arXiv preprint. The articles was published in journals in early 2010.) from a search of Sloan Digital Sky Survey (SDSS) Data Release 7, an astronomical survey conducted at Apache Point Observatory in New Mexico, United States. It has two discovery papers: Bowler et al., 2009 and Schmidt et al., 2009.

Component B was discovered in early 2010 from UKIDSS Large Area Survey (ULAS) Data Release 5 & 6, an astronomical survey conducted on the United Kingdom Infrared Telescope (UKIRT) on Mauna Kea in Hawaii. It has also two discovery papers: Burningham et al., 2010 and Scholz, 2010. Burningham et al. discovered the whole system (independently of Bowler et al. and Schmidt et al.) by cross-matching the ULAS DR5 against SDSS DR7, and Scholz discovered component B by inspecting the UKIDSS finding charts around already found component A.

== Distance ==
In 2012 was published the first relatively precise parallax of SDSS J1416+1348, measured at the Canada-France-Hawaii Telescope under The Hawaii Infrared Parallax Program: 109.9 ± 1.8 mas, corresponding to a distance 9.10 ± 0.15 pc (29.7 ± 0.5 ly). (Although, two parallaxes with large errors was previously published by Bowler et al. and Scholz).

SDSS J1416+1348 distance estimates
Source	Parallax, mas	Distance, pc	Distance, ly	Ref.
Bowler et al., 2009	107 ± 34 (Note: Relative parallax.)	9.3^{+4.4}_{−2.3}	30.5^{+14.2}_{−7.6}	
Bowler et al., 2009		8.4 ± 1.9	27.4 ± 6.2	
Schmidt et al., 2009		8.0 ± 1.6	26.1 ± 5.2	
Burningham et al., 2010		5–15	16–49	
Scholz, 2010		7.9 ± 1.7	25.8 ± 5.5	
Burgasser et al., 2010		10.6^{+3.0}_{−2.8}	34.6^{+9.8}_{−9.1}	
Cushing et al., 2010		9.7 ± 0.1 (Note: The error does not include any errors in temperature and surface gravity and therefore is actually larger.)	31.6 ± 0.3	
The Hawaii Infrared Parallax Program (Dupuy & Liu, 2012)	**109.9 ± 1.8**	**9.10 ± 0.15**	**29.7 ± 0.5**	

Non-trigonometric distance estimates are marked in italic. The best estimate is marked in bold.

== Space motion ==
SDSS J1416+1348 has proper motion 165 mas·yr^{−1} with position angle 32 degrees, indicating motion in north-east direction on the sky. Corresponding right ascension and declination components of proper motion are 88.0 ± 2.8 mas/yr and 139.9 ± 1.3 mas/yr, respectively. At distance 29.7 ly (assuming parallax 109.0 ± 1.8 mas), corresponding tangential velocity is 7.1 km/s. Radial velocity of SDSS J1416+1348 is -42.2 ± 5.1 km/s. (Negative radial velocity value indicates that SDSS J1416+1348 is now approaching to us). Total velocity of SDSS J1416+1348 relatively to Solar system is 42.8 km/s.

SDSS J1416+1348 space motions estimates

Source	μ, mas/yr	P. A., °	μ_{RA}, mas/yr	μ_{DEC}, mas/yr	V_{tan}, km/s (Note: Assuming parallax 109.9 ± 1.8 mas.)	V_{r}, km/s	Ref.
Bowler et al., 2009	151 ± 8	33 ± 4	82	127	6.5	–38 ± 10	
Schmidt et al., 2009	**165**	**32**	**88.0 ± 2.8**	**139.9 ± 1.3**	**7.1**	**-42.2 ± 5.1**	
Scholz, 2010	163	32	86.2 ± 2.6	138.8 ± 2.6	7.1		
SIMBAD	165	32	88 ± 3	140 ± 2	7.1	-87 ± 33	
Dupuy & Liu, 2012	161.3 ± 2.8	36.1 ± 1.2	95.1 ± 3.0	130.3 ± 3.0	7.1		

The most accurate estimates are marked in bold.

Space motion of SDSS J1416+1348 indicates that it is member of Galactic thin disk population.

=== Solar encounter ===
Since SDSS J1416+1348 moves much faster in radial direction than in tangential direction, and radial velocity is negative, this brown dwarf system should pass the Solar System in the future at a much smaller distance than today's distance. Proper motion and radial velocity values from Schmidt et al., 2009 and parallax from Dupuy & Liu, 2012, assuming motion with constant velocity along straight line, yield minimal distance 4.9 ly circa year 207100.

Solar encounter chronology, assuming motion with constant velocity in a straight line relative to the Solar System: (Note: Actually, galactic orbits may be considered as approximately straight lines only on a scale much smaller than theirs sizes.)

Date	Distance, ly	Constellation	Note
759300 BC	137.96	Virgo/Boötes	transition to constellation Boötes
493000 BC	100	Boötes	approach to a distance of 100 ly
141600 BC	50	Boötes	approach to a distance of 50 ly
300 BC	30	Boötes	approach to a distance of 30 ly
**2000**	**29.68**	**Boötes**	**near present time**
71300	20	Boötes	approach to a distance of 20 ly
107900	15	Boötes	approach to a distance of 15 ly
146200	10	Boötes	approach to a distance of 10 ly
162900	8.01	Boötes/Corona Borealis	transition to constellation Corona Borealis
168000	7.46	Corona Borealis/Boötes	transition to constellation Boötes
170600	7.18	Boötes/Hercules	transition to constellation Hercules
186500	5.76	Hercules/Draco	transition to constellation Draco
202000	5	Draco	approach to a distance of 5 ly
203600	4.97	Draco/Cygnus	transition to constellation Cygnus
**207100**	**4.95**	**Cygnus**	**minimal distance**
207600	4.95	Cygnus/Cepheus	transition to constellation Cepheus
212200	5	Cepheus	removal to a distance of 5 ly
212800	5.01	Cepheus/Cygnus	transition to constellation Cygnus
215300	5.08	Cygnus /Cepheus	transition to constellation Cepheus
215600	5.09	Cepheus/Lacerta	transition to constellation Lacerta
222500	5.41	Lacerta/Andromeda	transition to constellation Andromeda
262300	9.3	Andromeda/Pisces	transition to constellation Pisces
268000	10	Pisces	removal to a distance of 10 ly
306400	15	Pisces	removal to a distance of 15 ly
343000	20	Pisces	removal to a distance of 20 ly
410500	29.44	Pisces/Cetus	transition to constellation Cetus
414500	30	Cetus	removal to a distance of 30 ly
**507000**	**43.07**	**Cetus**	**transition to southern hemisphere**
555900	50	Cetus	removal to a distance of 50 ly
907200	100	Cetus	removal to a distance of 100 ly

== System's properties ==
SDSS J1416+1348 is an old system (age estimates: >0.8 Gyr, ~10 Gyr, ~5 Gyr, 2–10 Gyr, >3.2 Gyr), and, probably, possesses low metallicity. Its two components are separated at angular distance 9.81 arcsec, corresponding to a projected separation 89.3 ± 1.5 a. u. The system's orbit semi-major axis estimate is 104^{+28}_{−72} a. u.

=== Component A ===
The primary (brighter) component (SDSS J141624.08+134826.7 is its full designation; also known as SDSS J1416+13A) is a brown dwarf of spectral type sdL7, or L6, or L5, or d/sdL7. It has unusually blue near-infrared J−K_{S} color. According to Cushing et al. 2010, its peculiar spectrum is primarily a result of thin condensate clouds, and also vertical mixing occurs in its atmosphere. However, in Burgasser et al., 2010 it was suggested that its (as well as component's B) peculiarities arise from age or metallicity, rather than cloud properties alone (since both A and B components have common peculiarities).

=== Component B ===
The secondary (fainter) component (ULAS J141623.94+134836.3, abbreviated to ULAS J1416+1348, also known as SDSS J1416+13B) is a brown dwarf of spectral type T7.5, or T7.5p. It has unusually extremely blue near-infrared color H−K, very red optical-to-near-infrared color (z−Y > +2.3 and z−J > +3.1), and extremely red color H−[4.5] = 4.86 ± 0.04 (it was suggested, that the latter may be explained by presence of a cooler unresolved companion to SDSS J1416+13B). Also, its spectrum indicates high surface gravity and/or subsolar metallicity.

== See also ==
- List of star systems within 25–30 light-years
- 2M1101AB
- UScoCTIO 108
- Oph 162225-240515
- Binary brown dwarfs
