= UScoCTIO 108 =

Binary star system

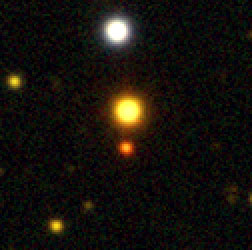
- UScoCTIO 108A is the yellow object in the middle and the B component is the orange object below Credit: legacy surveys

Observation data Epoch J2000.0 (ICRS) Equinox ICRS
- Constellation: Scorpius
- Right ascension: 16^{h} 05^{m} 53.94^{s}
- Declination: −18° 18′ 42.7″

Characteristics
- Spectral type: M7+M9.5

Astrometry
Proper motion (μ)	RA: -7.4 ± 4.6 mas/yr Dec.: -20.4 ± 4.6 mas/yr
Distance	473 ± 6 ly (145 ± 2 pc)

Details

A
Mass	0.057 ± 0.019 M_{☉}
Radius	0.46 R_{☉}
Luminosity	0.011^{+0.06}_{−0.03} L_{☉}
Temperature	2700 ± 100 K
Age	11 Myr

B
Mass	14 M_{Jup}
Temperature	2300 K

Database references
SIMBAD	data

UScoCTIO 108B
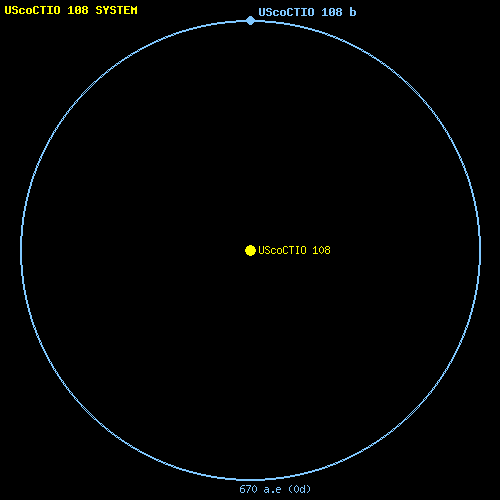
- UScoCTIO 108 B's orbit

Position (relative to A)
Epoch of observation	J2007.5
Angular distance	4.6 ± 0.1″
Position angle	177 ± 1°
Projected separation	~670 AU

Characteristics
- Spectral type: M9.5 ± 0.5

Details
Mass	0.015^{+0.009}_{−0.004} M_{☉}
Mass	15.79 M_{Jup}
Radius	0.16 ± 0.01 R_{☉}
Radius	1.557 R_{Jup}
Luminosity	0.00065 ± 0.00007 L_{☉}
Surface gravity (log g)	4.0 ± 0.5 cgs
Temperature	2300 ± 100 K

Orbit
Primary	UScoCTIO 108 A
Semi-major axis (a)	670 AU

Other designations
- UscoCTIO 108b

Database references
SIMBAD	data

UScoCTIO 108 is a binary system, approximately 470 light-years away from Earth, in the Upper Scorpius (USco) OB association. The primary star, UScoCTIO 108A, is with a mass of around 0.06 solar masses, is a brown dwarf or low-mass red dwarf. The secondary star, UScoCTIO 108B, with a mass of around the deuterium burning limit of 13 Jupiter masses, can be classified as either a brown dwarf or an extrasolar planet.

The primary component of the system was discovered in the year 2000 as a possible member of the Upper Scorpius association, based on its position in an HR diagram. It was observed in a search for new members of the association by the Cerro Tololo Inter-American Observatory (CTIO), where it received the designation UScoCTIO 108. Later, spectroscopic and photometric observations confirmed that the object is a real member of the association, showing signs of low gravity and youth, and estimated a mass of 60 times the mass of Jupiter (M_{J}), an effective temperature of 2,800 K and a spectral type of M7. The low mass indicates that the object is not able to sustain hydrogen fusion, making it a brown dwarf.

The secondary member of the system was found in 2008 as an object located at a separation of 4.6 arcseconds, which corresponds to a physical separation of more than 670 AU, and is also a confirmed member of the Upper Scorpius association. Its spectrum shows it is also a cold substellar object, with an effective temperature of 2,300K and a spectral type of M 9.5. Its mass was originally estimated at 14 M_{J}, very close to the nominal boundary between planets and brown dwarf, but a recent revision of the age of the Upper Scorpius association to 11 million years increased this value to 16 M_{J}, indicating that the object is likely a low mass brown dwarf. The physical association between the two brown dwarfs has not been confirmed by observation of common proper motion, but is considered very likely given the proximity between them.

The minimum separation between the two brown dwarfs, 670 AU, is much larger than the mean of other similar mass systems, and indicates that the pair (if they really form a binary system) is very weakly bound, with an escape velocity of 0.4 km/s for the secondary component. Considering the average stellar density in an association like Upper Scorpius, it is estimated that perturbations by passing stars will cause the rupture of the system in a few million years.

Observations by the infrared telescope WISE revealed excess emission at 12 and 22 μm, indicating the presence of a debris disk around the brown dwarf.

== See also ==
- SDSS J1416+1348
- 2M1101AB
- Oph 162225-240515
- Binary brown dwarfs
