= List of stars in Pavo =

Brightest stars in Pavo the Peacock

This is the list of notable stars in the constellation Pavo, sorted by decreasing brightness.

Name	B	Var	HD	HIP	RA	Dec	vis. mag.	abs. mag.	Dist. (ly)	Sp. class	Notes
α Pav	α		193924	100751	20^{h} 25^{m} 38.85^{s}	−56° 44′ 05.6″	1.94	−1.81	183	B2IV	Peacock, Joo Tseo; suspected variable, V_{max} = 1.93^{m}, V_{min} = 1.96^{m}
β Pav	β		197051	102395	20^{h} 44^{m} 57.56^{s}	−66° 12′ 11.7″	3.42	0.29	137	A5IV	
δ Pav	δ		190248	99240	20^{h} 08^{m} 41.86^{s}	−66° 10′ 45.6″	3.55	4.62	20	G5IV-Vvar	Nearby Sun-like star
η Pav	η		160635	86929	17^{h} 45^{m} 44.00^{s}	−64° 43′ 25.4″	3.61	−1.67	371	K1III	
ε Pav	ε		188228	98495	20^{h} 00^{m} 35.39^{s}	−72° 54′ 36.7″	3.97	1.41	106	A0V	suspected variable, V_{max} = 3.93^{m}, V_{min} = 3.97^{m}
ζ Pav	ζ		171759	91792	18^{h} 43^{m} 02.13^{s}	−71° 25′ 39.8″	4.01	−0.03	210	K2III	
γ Pav	γ		203608	105858	21^{h} 26^{m} 26.49^{s}	−65° 22′ 05.3″	4.21	4.39	30	F6V	suspected variable, V_{max} = 4.17^{m}, V_{min} = 4.30^{m}
λ Pav	λ		173948	92609	18^{h} 52^{m} 13.04^{s}	−62° 11′ 15.2″	4.22	−4.50	1811	B2II-III	γ Cas variable, V_{max} = 4^{m}, V_{min} = 4.26^{m}
π Pav	π		165040	88866	18^{h} 08^{m} 34.79^{s}	−63° 40′ 05.0″	4.33	1.19	138	Am	
ξ Pav	ξ		168339	90098	18^{h} 23^{m} 13.62^{s}	−61° 29′ 38.1″	4.35	−1.20	420	M1III SB	
κ Pav	κ		174694	93015	18^{h} 56^{m} 57.04^{s}	−67° 14′ 00.7″	4.40	−1.71	543	F5Ib-II:	W Vir variable, V_{max} = 3.91^{m}, V_{min} = 4.78^{m}, P = 9.083 d
ν Pav	ν		169978	90797	18^{h} 31^{m} 22.43^{s}	−62° 16′ 41.5″	4.63	−1.20	479	B8III	53 Per variable, V_{max} = 4.60^{m}, V_{min} = 4.64^{m}, P = 0.85584 d
φ^{1} Pav	φ^{1}		195627	101612	20^{h} 35^{m} 34.77^{s}	−60° 34′ 52.7″	4.75	2.55	90	F1III	
HD 172555			172555	92024	18^{h} 45^{m} 26.86^{s}	−64° 52′ 15.2″	4.78	2.45	95	A7V	
ρ Pav	ρ		195961	101773	20^{h} 37^{m} 35.24^{s}	−61° 31′ 47.1″	4.85	0.98	195	Fm...	δ Sct variable, ΔV = 0.055^{m}, P = 0.1141 d
NU Pav	(λ^{2}) (Note: In Bode's Uranographia) (Note: This is Lacaille's Lambda^{2} Indi. It was included in Pavo and it's no longer used.)	NU	189124	98608	20^{h} 01^{m} 44.72^{s}	−59° 22′ 33.0″	4.95	−0.67	434	M6III	semiregular variable, V_{max} = 4.91^{m}, V_{min} = 5.26^{m}, P = 60 d
ο Pav	ο		201371	104755	21^{h} 13^{m} 20.44^{s}	−70° 07′ 34.4″	5.06	−2.12	888	M2III	semiregular variable, V_{max} = 5.00^{m}, V_{min} = 5.10^{m}, P = 228.3 d
φ^{2} Pav	φ^{2}		196378	101983	20^{h} 40^{m} 02.27^{s}	−60° 32′ 51.0″	5.11	3.19	79	F8V	
ω Pav	ω (Note: Also labelled Omega Telescopii (ω Tel/ω Telescopii) by Bode in his Uranographia)		175329	93163	18^{h} 58^{m} 36.59^{s}	−60° 12′ 02.3″	5.14	−0.86	516	K1III-IV	suspected variable
υ Pav	υ		196519	102157	20^{h} 41^{m} 57.06^{s}	−66° 45′ 38.3″	5.14	−1.92	840	B8Vvar	
HD 188162			188162	98174	19^{h} 57^{m} 06.28^{s}	−58° 54′ 04.7″	5.24	0.41	302	B9.5IV	
HD 177389			177389	94150	19^{h} 09^{m} 52.62^{s}	−68° 25′ 27.6″	5.31	2.48	120	G8/K0III/IV	
μ^{2} Pav	μ^{2}		188887	98624	20^{h} 01^{m} 52.40^{s}	−66° 56′ 37.7″	5.32	1.04	234	K2IVCN...	
HD 186219			186219	97534	19^{h} 49^{m} 25.29^{s}	−72° 30′ 12.3″	5.39	2.30	135	A4III	
HD 186957	(λ^{1}) (Note: This is Lacaille's Lambda^{1} Indi. It was included in Pavo and it's no longer used.)		186957	97646	19^{h} 50^{m} 44.78^{s}	−59° 11′ 37.1″	5.41	0.90	260	A0IV	
σ Pav	σ		197635	102773	20^{h} 49^{m} 18.28^{s}	−68° 46′ 35.0″	5.41	0.56	305	K0III	
ι Pav	ι		165499	89042	18^{h} 10^{m} 26.26^{s}	−62° 00′ 10.0″	5.47	4.22	58	G0V	
SX Pav		SX	203881	106044	21^{h} 28^{m} 44.79^{s}	−69° 30′ 19.0″	5.47	0.05	396	M5III	semiregular variable, V_{max} = 5.18^{m}, V_{min} = 5.99^{m}, P = 50.87 d
HD 179366			179366	94789	19^{h} 17^{m} 12.22^{s}	−66° 39′ 39.7″	5.52	0.73	296	A4IV/V	
HD 166599			166599	89487	18^{h} 15^{m} 40.66^{s}	−63° 03′ 19.1″	5.58	0.79	296	K0III/IV	
HD 198160			198160	102962	20^{h} 51^{m} 38.40^{s}	−62° 25′ 45.2″	5.67	1.35	238	A2	
HD 200525			200525	104440	21^{h} 09^{m} 21.52^{s}	−73° 10′ 20.2″	5.67	4.31	61	G3IV	
θ Pav	θ		173168	92294	18^{h} 48^{m} 37.96^{s}	−65° 04′ 39.0″	5.71	1.51	226	A9V	
HD 169836			169836	90664	18^{h} 29^{m} 56.68^{s}	−57° 31′ 23.1″	5.74	0.54	357	K0III	
HD 188097			188097	98332	19^{h} 58^{m} 41.18^{s}	−69° 09′ 49.4″	5.74	1.48	232	Am	
μ^{1} Pav	μ^{1}		188584	98478	20^{h} 00^{m} 23.11^{s}	−66° 56′ 56.0″	5.75	1.64	216	K0IV	
HD 200751			200751	104364	21^{h} 08^{m} 32.71^{s}	−63° 55′ 41.8″	5.75	−0.13	489	K0III	
HD 172211			172211	91854	18^{h} 43^{m} 37.32^{s}	−64° 33′ 04.7″	5.76	0.26	410	K0III	
HD 161814			161814	87393	17^{h} 51^{m} 35.47^{s}	−60° 09′ 50.5″	5.78	0.50	371	K0III	
HD 169570			169570	90930	18^{h} 32^{m} 55.33^{s}	−73° 57′ 55.4″	5.88	0.69	356	K0III	
HD 175986			175986	93574	19^{h} 03^{m} 29.68^{s}	−68° 45′ 19.9″	5.89	2.12	185	F8V	
HD 160720			160720	86871	17^{h} 44^{m} 55.84^{s}	−57° 32′ 43.8″	5.97	0.49	406	G8III	
HD 175401			175401	93287	19^{h} 00^{m} 03.55^{s}	−66° 39′ 12.7″	5.98	0.33	439	K0III	
HD 182709			182709	95999	19^{h} 31^{m} 10.94^{s}	−68° 26′ 02.0″	5.98	−1.54	1042	K4/K5III	suspected variable
HD 172630			172630	92008	18^{h} 45^{m} 11.50^{s}	−61° 05′ 42.5″	6.04	−1.47	1035	K3III	
HD 172881			172881	92394	18^{h} 49^{m} 43.68^{s}	−72° 59′ 44.6″	6.04	−0.73	736	B9.5IV/V	
NZ Pav		NZ	186786	97674	19^{h} 51^{m} 01.09^{s}	−65° 36′ 16.9″	6.04	2.15	196	F2III-IV	δ Sct variable, ΔV = 0.017^{m}, P = 0.08 d
HD 189567			189567	98959	20^{h} 05^{m} 31.49^{s}	−67° 19′ 09.3″	6.07	4.83	58	G2V	has a planet (b)
HD 184996			184996	96882	19^{h} 41^{m} 37.24^{s}	−65° 51′ 15.3″	6.08	−0.74	753	M0III	
HD 191603			191603	99762	20^{h} 14^{m} 26.96^{s}	−63° 24′ 57.1″	6.09	1.80	235	F0IV	
HD 195402			195402	101626	20^{h} 35^{m} 51.67^{s}	−69° 36′ 37.7″	6.09	−0.94	830	K2III	
HD 203212			203212	105768	21^{h} 25^{m} 18.01^{s}	−71° 47′ 56.7″	6.09	0.03	531	K2III	
HD 168740		V346	168740	90304	18^{h} 25^{m} 31.63^{s}	−63° 01′ 16.6″	6.13	1.87	232	A3V	δ Sct variable
HD 167425			167425	89805	18^{h} 19^{m} 40.08^{s}	−63° 53′ 09.2″	6.17	4.37	75	F9V	
HD 200924			200924	104597	21^{h} 11^{m} 20.87^{s}	−72° 32′ 39.4″	6.18	0.79	390	K1III	
HD 184585			184585	96607	19^{h} 38^{m} 25.92^{s}	−57° 58′ 59.5″	6.19	0.34	482	K0III	
HD 186837			186837	97611	19^{h} 50^{m} 21.75^{s}	−61° 03′ 40.1″	6.21	−0.99	898	B5V	
HD 187653			187653	97971	19^{h} 54^{m} 40.45^{s}	−61° 10′ 14.9″	6.21	1.36	304	A3V	
HD 172781			172781	92021	18^{h} 45^{m} 23.93^{s}	−56° 52′ 54.9″	6.22	−0.39	685	K3III	
HD 196317			196317	101965	20^{h} 39^{m} 51.72^{s}	−62° 54′ 27.4″	6.22	0.64	426	K1III	
τ Pav	τ		179009	94724	19^{h} 16^{m} 28.60^{s}	−69° 11′ 26.7″	6.25	−0.14	619	A6IV/V	
HD 192531			192531	100165	20^{h} 19^{m} 03.01^{s}	−63° 13′ 50.0″	6.27	0.59	445	K0III	
Y Pav		Y	203133	105678	21^{h} 24^{m} 16.73^{s}	−69° 44′ 01.9″	6.28	−1.52	1181	C5II	semiregular variable, V_{max} = 5.79^{m}, V_{min} = 6.90^{m}, P = 449 d
HD 176522			176522	93629	19^{h} 04^{m} 01.00^{s}	−57° 57′ 35.9″	6.30	0.11	565	G6II/III	
HD 166841			166841	89674	18^{h} 18^{m} 00.96^{s}	−68° 13′ 45.2″	6.32	−0.33	697	B9V	
HD 202299			202299	105148	21^{h} 18^{m} 00.47^{s}	−64° 40′ 53.4″	6.32	0.18	552	B8V	suspected variable, V_{max} = 6.30^{m}, V_{min} = 6.33^{m}
HD 181019			181019	95369	19^{h} 24^{m} 05.51^{s}	−68° 22′ 15.9″	6.33	−0.25	676	K2III	
HD 195772			195772	101684	20^{h} 36^{m} 38.33^{s}	−63° 07′ 14.8″	6.34	2.50	191	F2V	
HD 172021			172021	91733	18^{h} 42^{m} 22.63^{s}	−64° 38′ 34.7″	6.35	−0.51	767	A5V	
HD 162521			162521	87822	17^{h} 56^{m} 24.18^{s}	−65° 43′ 15.5″	6.36	3.67	113	F8V	
HD 191095			191095	99453	20^{h} 11^{m} 07.41^{s}	−57° 31′ 27.0″	6.36	0.65	452	A1V	variable star
HD 199475			199475	103752	21^{h} 01^{m} 28.03^{s}	−68° 12′ 34.6″	6.36	1.76	272	A2V	
HD 184586			184586	96734	19^{h} 39^{m} 52.13^{s}	−66° 41′ 07.5″	6.37	1.31	335	A0Vn	
HD 165497			165497	89006	18^{h} 09^{m} 57.59^{s}	−59° 02′ 24.6″	6.38	−0.09	642	K4III	
HD 188164			188164	98346	19^{h} 58^{m} 52.93^{s}	−68° 45′ 44.7″	6.38	1.28	341	A2V	
HD 164871			164871	88815	18^{h} 07^{m} 48.37^{s}	−64° 33′ 00.1″	6.40	0.32	535	K2/K3III	
HD 170525			170525	90981	18^{h} 33^{m} 29.44^{s}	−58° 42′ 30.7″	6.40	2.89	164	G5IV	
HD 161475			161475	87264	17^{h} 49^{m} 53.01^{s}	−61° 42′ 52.8″	6.41	−0.22	689	B9IV	
HD 195190			195190	101570	20^{h} 35^{m} 06.34^{s}	−71° 11′ 19.7″	6.41	−0.55	805	K2III	
HD 179419			179419	94770	19^{h} 17^{m} 00.53^{s}	−65° 13′ 39.5″	6.42	−0.24	700	B8/B9V	
HD 186584			186584	97569	19^{h} 49^{m} 53.42^{s}	−66° 48′ 47.1″	6.44	−1.15	1076	K4III	
HD 190222			190222	99200	20^{h} 08^{m} 20.48^{s}	−66° 21′ 16.8″	6.45	−1.28	1144	K5III	
HD 166251			166251	89370	18^{h} 14^{m} 16.36^{s}	−63° 41′ 22.3″	6.47	0.10	614	K4III	
HD 174877	χ (Note: In Bode’s Uranographia) (Note: This designation was dropped by Benjamin Gould)		174877	93012	18^{h} 56^{m} 54.70^{s}	−62° 48′ 06.9″	6.47	−1.24	1136	K3III	
HD 161955			161955	87564	17^{h} 53^{m} 18.22^{s}	−65° 29′ 18.4″	6.48	0.47	519	K0/K1III	
HD 175007			175007	93238	18^{h} 59^{m} 29.27^{s}	−70° 28′ 06.1″	6.49	1.33	351	A8V	
HD 192887			192887	100379	20^{h} 21^{m} 28.46^{s}	−66° 44′ 58.9″	6.49	3.27	143	F6V	
V Pav		V	160435	86728	17^{h} 43^{m} 18.94^{s}	−57° 43′ 26.3″	6.84		1210	C+	semiregular variable, V_{max} = 6.3^{m}, V_{min} = 7.17^{m}, P = 226.1 d
HD 164427			164427	88531	18^{h} 04^{m} 42.60^{s}	−59° 12′ 34.5″	6.84		123.9	G0+V	has a low-mass companion
HD 179140	(ψ) (Note: Labelled Psi Telescopii (ψ Tel/ψ Telescopii) by Bode ion his Uranographia)		179140	94570	19^{h} 14^{m} 47.46^{s}	―58° 00′ 24.2″	7.23		172	G2V	
AR Pav		AR		89886	18^{h} 20^{m} 27.88^{s}	−66° 04′ 42.9″	7.40		2300	B1	Z And and Algol variable, V_{max} = 7.40^{m}, V_{min} = 13.620^{m}, P = 604.6 d
R Pav		R	165961	89258	18^{h} 12^{m} 52.95^{s}	−63° 36′ 57.3″	7.50		1100	M4.5e	Mira variable, V_{max} = 6.86^{m}, V_{min} = 14.0^{m}, P = 234 d
HD 196050			196050	101806	20^{h} 37^{m} 51.71^{s}	−60° 38′ 04.1″	7.6	4.2	153	G3V	has a planet (b)
KZ Pav		KZ	199005	103542	20^{h} 58^{m} 40.10^{s}	−70° 25′ 19.8″	7.71		434	F6V	Algol variable, V_{max} = 7.71^{m}, V_{min} = 9.3^{m}, P = 0.9498768 d
HD 175167			175167	93281	19^{h} 00^{m} 00.84^{s}	−69° 56′ 39.3″	8.00	3.87	219	G5IV/V	has a planet (b)
HD 181433			181433	95467	19^{h} 25^{m} 09.57^{s}	−66° 28′ 07.7″	8.38	6.24	87	K5V	has three planets (b, c & d)
HD 175607			175607	93373	19^{h} 01^{m} 05.0^{s}	−66° 11′ 34″	8.6		148	G6V	has two planets (b &c)
HD 190984			190984	99496	20^{h} 11^{m} 30.72^{s}	−64° 37′ 13.7″	8.73	2.34	618	F8V	has a planet (b)
MW Pav		MW	197070	102508	20^{h} 46^{m} 27.75^{s}	−71° 56′ 58.5″	8.79		682	F3IV/V	W UMa variable, V_{max} = 8.51^{m}, V_{min} = 8.95^{m}, P = 0.794994 d
X Pav		X	191155; 191171	99512	20^{h} 11^{m} 45.86^{s}	−59° 56′ 12.8″	9.20		2190	M6/M7III:p	semiregular variable
Gliese 693				86990	17^{h} 46^{m} 34.23^{s}	−57° 18′ 08.6″	10.78		19.011	M2.0	suspected variable
V347 Pav		V347			18^{h} 44^{m} 48.25^{s}	−74° 18′ 34.2″	14.85			CV	AM Her variable, V_{max} = 14.85^{m}, V_{min} = 16.67^{m}, P = 0.062553 d
SCR 1845-6357					18^{h} 45^{m} 05.42^{s}	−63° 57′ 47.6″	17.40		12.565	M8.5	has a planet or brown dwarf companion
BD Pav		BD			18^{h} 43^{m} 11.92^{s}	−57° 30′ 44.9″					U Gem and W UMa variable
Table legend: • Name = Proper name • B = Bayer designation • F or/and G. = Flamsteed designation or Gould designation • Var = Variable-star designation • HD = Henry Draper Catalogue designation number • HIP = Hipparcos Catalogue designation number • RA = Right ascension for the Epoch/Equinox J2000.0 • Dec = Declination for the Epoch/Equinox J2000.0 • vis. mag. = visual magnitude (m or m_{v}), also known as apparent magnitude • abs. mag. = absolute magnitude (M_{v}) • Dist. (ly) = Distance in light-years from Earth • Sp. class = Spectral class of the star in the stellar classification system • Notes = Common name(s) or alternate name(s); comments; notable properties [for example: multiple star status, range of variability if it is a variable star, exoplanets, etc.]

== See also ==
- List of stars by constellation
