= Pavo in Chinese astronomy =

The modern constellation Pavo is not included in the Three Enclosures and Twenty-Eight Mansions system of traditional Chinese uranography because its stars are too far south for observers in China to know about them prior to the introduction of Western star charts. Based on the work of Xu Guangqi and the German Jesuit missionary Johann Adam Schall von Bell in the late Ming dynasty, this constellation has been classified as one of the 23 Southern Asterisms (近南極星區, Jìnnánjíxīngōu) under the name Peacock (孔雀, Kǒngqiāo).

Peacock (Alpha Pavonis) is the brightest star in this constellation. It is never seen in the Chinese sky.

The name of the western constellation in modern Chinese is 孔雀座 (kǒng què zuò), which means "the peacock constellation".

== Stars ==
The map of Chinese constellation in constellation Pavo area consists of:

Four Symbols	Mansion (Chinese name)	Romanization	Translation	Asterisms (Chinese name)	Romanization	Translation	Western star name	Proper Name	Chinese star name	Romanization	Translation
-	近南極星區 (non-mansions)	Jìnnánjíxīngōu (non-mansions)	The Southern Asterisms (non-mansions)	孔雀	Kǒngqiāo	Peacock					
-	近南極星區 (non-mansions)	Jìnnánjíxīngōu (non-mansions)	The Southern Asterisms (non-mansions)	孔雀	Kǒngqiāo	Peacock	η Pav		孔雀一	Kǒngqiāoyī	1st star
-	近南極星區 (non-mansions)	Jìnnánjíxīngōu (non-mansions)	The Southern Asterisms (non-mansions)	孔雀	Kǒngqiāo	Peacock	π Pav		孔雀二	Kǒngqiāoèr	2nd star
-	近南極星區 (non-mansions)	Jìnnánjíxīngōu (non-mansions)	The Southern Asterisms (non-mansions)	孔雀	Kǒngqiāo	Peacock	ν Pav		孔雀三	Kǒngqiāosān	3rd star
-	近南極星區 (non-mansions)	Jìnnánjíxīngōu (non-mansions)	The Southern Asterisms (non-mansions)	孔雀	Kǒngqiāo	Peacock	λ Pav		孔雀四	Kǒngqiāosì	4th star
-	近南極星區 (non-mansions)	Jìnnánjíxīngōu (non-mansions)	The Southern Asterisms (non-mansions)	孔雀	Kǒngqiāo	Peacock	κ Pav		孔雀五	Kǒngqiāowu	5th star
-	近南極星區 (non-mansions)	Jìnnánjíxīngōu (non-mansions)	The Southern Asterisms (non-mansions)	孔雀	Kǒngqiāo	Peacock	δ Pav		孔雀六	Kǒngqiāoliù	6th star
-	近南極星區 (non-mansions)	Jìnnánjíxīngōu (non-mansions)	The Southern Asterisms (non-mansions)	孔雀	Kǒngqiāo	Peacock	β Pav		孔雀七	Kǒngqiāoqī	7th star
-	近南極星區 (non-mansions)	Jìnnánjíxīngōu (non-mansions)	The Southern Asterisms (non-mansions)	孔雀	Kǒngqiāo	Peacock	ζ Pav		孔雀八	Kǒngqiāobā	8th star
-	近南極星區 (non-mansions)	Jìnnánjíxīngōu (non-mansions)	The Southern Asterisms (non-mansions)	孔雀	Kǒngqiāo	Peacock	ε Pav		孔雀九	Kǒngqiāojiǔ	9th star
-	近南極星區 (non-mansions)	Jìnnánjíxīngōu (non-mansions)	The Southern Asterisms (non-mansions)	孔雀	Kǒngqiāo	Peacock	γ Pav		孔雀十	Kǒngqiāoshí	10th star
-	近南極星區 (non-mansions)	Jìnnánjíxīngōu (non-mansions)	The Southern Asterisms (non-mansions)	孔雀	Kǒngqiāo	Peacock	α Pav	Peacock	孔雀十一	Kǒngqiāoshíyī	11th star
-	近南極星區 (non-mansions)	Jìnnánjíxīngōu (non-mansions)	The Southern Asterisms (non-mansions)	孔雀	Kǒngqiāo	Peacock	HD 172555		孔雀增一	Kǒngqiāozēngyī	1st additional star
-	近南極星區 (non-mansions)	Jìnnánjíxīngōu (non-mansions)	The Southern Asterisms (non-mansions)	孔雀	Kǒngqiāo	Peacock	ξ Pav		孔雀增二	Kǒngqiāozēngèr	2nd additional star
-	近南極星區 (non-mansions)	Jìnnánjíxīngōu (non-mansions)	The Southern Asterisms (non-mansions)	孔雀	Kǒngqiāo	Peacock	ω Pav		孔雀增三	Kǒngqiāozēngsān	3rd additional star

== See also ==
- Chinese astronomy
- Traditional Chinese star names
- Chinese constellations
- List of brightest stars
