= Alpha Pavonis =

Star in the southern constellation Pavo

α Pavonis
- Location of α Pavonis (circled)

Observation data Epoch J2000 Equinox ICRS
- Constellation: Pavo
- Right ascension: 20^{h} 25^{m} 38.85705^{s}
- Declination: −56° 44′ 06.3230″
- Apparent magnitude (V): 1.94

Characteristics
- Spectral type: B3 V
- U−B color index: −0.71
- B−V color index: −0.20

Astrometry
Radial velocity (R_{v})	+2.0 km/s
Proper motion (μ)	RA: 6.90 mas/yr Dec.: −86.02 mas/yr
Parallax (π)	18.24±0.52 mas
Distance	179 ± 5 ly (55 ± 2 pc)
Absolute magnitude (M_{V})	−1.762

Details
Mass	5.91 M_{☉}
Radius	4.83 R_{☉}
Luminosity	2,200 L_{☉}
Surface gravity (log g)	3.94 cgs
Temperature	17,711 K
Rotational velocity (v sin i)	16 km/s
Age	48 Myr

Other designations
- Peacock, α Pav, CPD−57°9674, FK5 764, HD 193924, HIP 100751, HR 7790, SAO 246574

Database references
SIMBAD	data

Alpha Pavonis (α Pavonis), formally named Peacock /ˈpiːkɒk/, is a binary star in the southern constellation of Pavo, near the border with the constellation Telescopium.

== Nomenclature ==
α Pavonis (Latinised to Alpha Pavonis, abbreviated Alpha Pav, α Pav) is the star's Bayer designation.

The name Peacock was assigned by His Majesty's Nautical Almanac Office in the late 1930s during the creation of the Air Almanac, a navigational almanac for the Royal Air Force. Of the fifty-seven stars included in the new almanac, two had no classical names: Alpha Pavonis and Epsilon Carinae. The RAF insisted that all of the stars must have names, so new names were invented. Alpha Pavonis was named "Peacock" ('pavo' is Latin for 'peacock') whilst Epsilon Carinae was called "Avior". In 2016, the International Astronomical Union organized a Working Group on Star Names (WGSN) to catalog and standardize proper names for stars. The WGSN's first bulletin of July 2016 included a table of the first two batches of names approved by the WGSN; which included Peacock for α Pavonis A and Avior for Epsilon Carinae A.

Nevertheless, other names for this star have existed. α Pavonis and α Indi formed the Arabic asterism al-ṣuradān (الصردان), the Two Shrikes, located behind the Domed Tent (al-qubba القبة, Corona Australis). Some German sources from the 19th and early 20th centuries listed α Pavonis with the name "Rediculus". In Marshallese, it is known as Likin-Buwame.

In Chinese caused by adaptation of the European southern hemisphere constellations into the Chinese system, 孔雀 (Kǒng Qiāo), meaning Peacock, refers to an asterism consisting of α Pavonis, η Pavonis, π Pavonis, ν Pavonis, λ Pavonis, κ Pavonis, δ Pavonis, β Pavonis, ζ Pavonis, ε Pavonis and γ Pavonis. Consequently, α Pavonis itself is known as 孔雀十一 (Kǒng Qiāo shíyī, English: the Eleventh Star of Peacock.)

== Properties ==
At an apparent magnitude of 1.94, this is the brightest star in Pavo. Based upon parallax measurements, this star is about 179 light-years (55 parsecs) distant from the Earth. It has an estimated six times the Sun's mass and 6 times the Sun's radius, but 2,200 times the luminosity of the Sun. The effective temperature of the photosphere is 17,700 K, which gives the star a blue-white hue. It has a stellar classification of B3 V, although older studies have often given it a subgiant luminosity class. It is classified as B2.5 IV in the Bright Star Catalogue.

Stars with the mass of Alpha Pavonis are believed not to have a convection zone near their surface. Hence the material found in the outer atmosphere is not processed by the nuclear fusion occurring at the core. This means that the surface abundance of elements should be representative of the material out of which it originally formed. In particular, the surface abundance of deuterium should not change during the star's main sequence lifetime. The measured ratio of deuterium to hydrogen in this star amounts to less than 5 × 10^{−6}, which suggests this star may have formed in a region with an unusually low abundance of deuterium, or else the deuterium was consumed by some means. A possible scenario for the latter is that the deuterium was burned through while Alpha Pavonis was a pre-main-sequence star.

The system is likely to be a member of the Tucana-Horologium association that share a common motion through space. The estimated age of this association is 45 million years. α Pavonis star has a peculiar velocity of 13 km s^{−1} relative to its neighbors.

== Companions ==
Three stars have been listed as visual companions to α Pavonis: two ninth magnitude stars at about four arc minutes; and a 12th magnitude F5 main sequence star at about one arc minute. The two ninth magnitude companions are only 17 arc seconds from each other.

α Pavonis A is a spectroscopic binary consisting of a pair of stars that orbit around each other with a period of 11.753 days. However, in part because the two stars have not been individually resolved, little is known about the companion except that it has a mass of at least 0.26 M_{☉}. One attempt to model a composite spectrum estimated components with spectral types of B0.5 and B2, and a brightness difference between the two components of 1.3 magnitudes.
