= Phi Pavonis =

The Bayer designation Phi Pavonis (φ Pav / φ Pavonis) is shared by two stars, in the constellation Pavo:

- φ¹ Pavonis
- φ² Pavonis
