= Pavonis =

Pavonis is the Latin genitive of Latin pavo = "peacock". It may refer to:-

- Pavonis Mons, a large mountain of Mars
- Pavo (constellation)
- Delta Pavonis, a nearby star
