= HD 181433 c =

Extrasolar planet in the constellation Pavo

Discovery
- Discovered by: Bouchy et al.
- Discovery site: La Silla Observatory, Chile
- Discovery date: June 16, 2008
- Detection method: Doppler spectroscopy

Orbital characteristics
- Apastron: 2.25 AU (337 million km)
- Periastron: 1.27 AU (190 million km)
- Semi-major axis: 1.76 AU (263 million km)
- Eccentricity: 0.28 ± 0.02
- Orbital period (sidereal): 962 ± 15 d 2.63 y
- Average orbital speed: 20.0
- Time of periastron: 2,453,235 ± 7.3
- Argument of periastron: 21.4 ± 3.2
- Star: HD 181433

HD 181433 c is an extrasolar planet located approximately 87 light-years away in the constellation of Pavo, orbiting the star HD 181433. This planet is at least 0.64 times as massive as Jupiter and takes 962 days to orbit the star at an orbital distance of 1.76 astronomical units (AU), or 263 million km. The orbit is eccentric, however, and ranges from 1.27 AU (190,000,000 km) at periastron to 2.25 AU (337,000,000 km) at apastron. François Bouchy et al. have published a paper detailing the HD 181433 planetary system in Astronomy and Astrophysics.
