= HD 181433 d =

Extrasolar planet in the constellation Pavo

Discovery
- Discovered by: Bouchy et al.
- Discovery site: (Chile) La Silla Observatory
- Discovery date: December 9, 2008
- Detection method: Doppler spectroscopy

Orbital characteristics
- Apastron: 4.44 AU (664,000,000 km)
- Periastron: 1.56 AU (233,000,000 km)
- Semi-major axis: 3.00 AU (449,000,000 km)
- Eccentricity: 0.48 ± 0.05
- Orbital period (sidereal): 2172 ± 158 d 5.947 y
- Average orbital speed: 15.1
- Time of periastron: 2452154 ± 194
- Argument of periastron: -30 ± 13
- Star: HD 181433

HD 181433 d is an extrasolar planet located approximately 87 light years away in the constellation of Pavo, orbiting the star HD 181433. This planet has a minimum mass of 0.54 Jupiter mass and takes 2172 days to orbit the star. The average orbital distance is 3.00 AU. At periastron distance, it will have distance from the star similar to Mars’ distance from the Sun at 1.56 AU. At apastron, the distance is 4.44 AU. These corresponds to the orbital eccentricity of 0.48.
