= NGC 6810 =

Galaxy in the constellation of Pavo

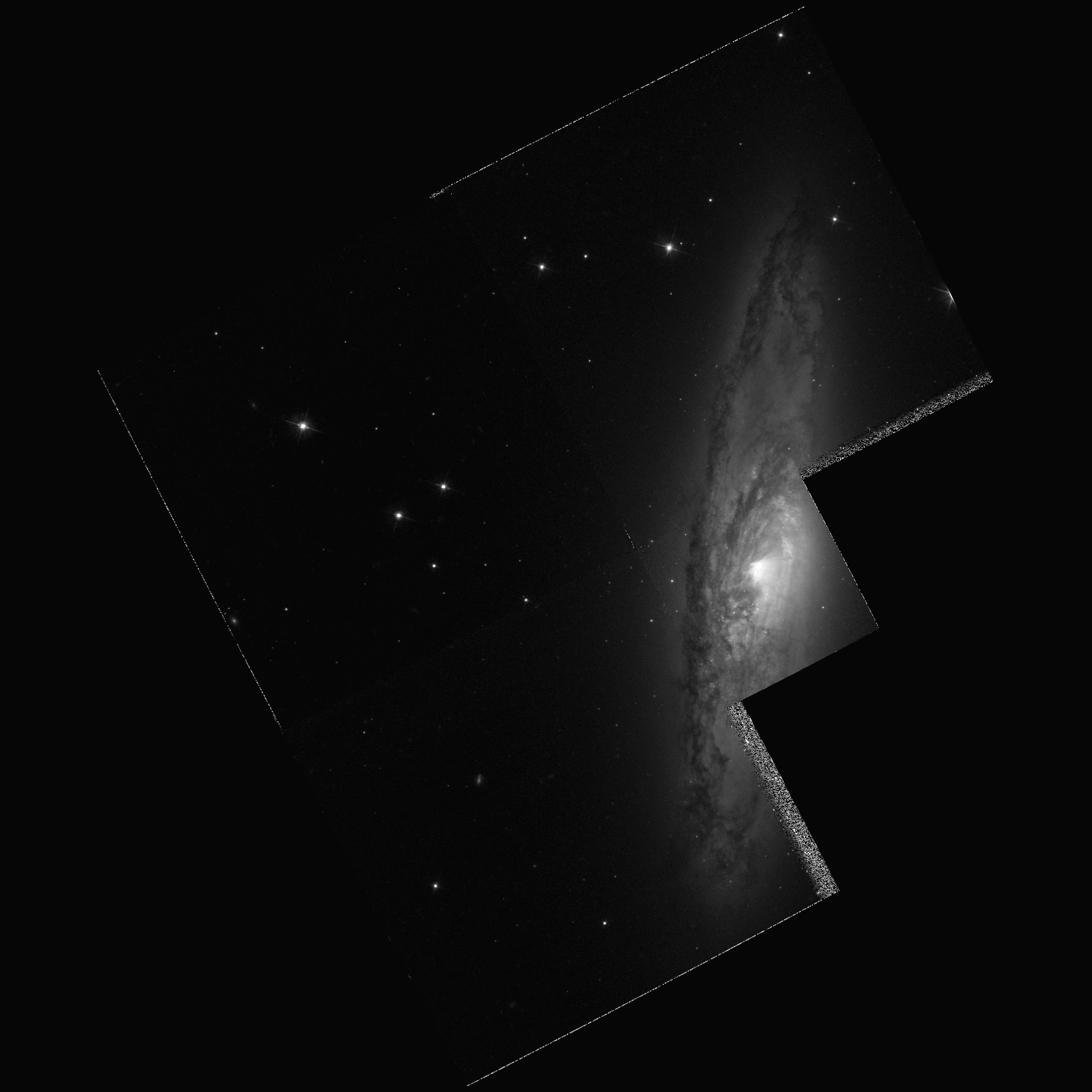
- NGC 6810

Observation data (J2000.0 epoch)
- Constellation: Pavo
- Right ascension: 19^{h} 43^{m} 34.25^{s}
- Declination: −58° 39′ 20.12″
- Redshift: 0.006775
- Heliocentric radial velocity: 2031 ± 10 km/s
- Distance: 87 Mly
- Apparent magnitude (V): 11.60
- Apparent magnitude (B): 12.40

Characteristics
- Type: SA(s)ab:sp
- Size: 53.42 kpc (174,200 ly) (diameter; 25.0 mag/arcsec^{2} B-band isophote)
- Apparent size (V): 3.2 x 0.9

Other designations
- PGC 63571, ESO 142-35

NGC 6810 is a spiral galaxy approximately 87 million light-years away from Earth in the constellation of Pavo.

== Observational history ==
NGC 6810 was discovered by John Herschel on July 10, 1834. It was later added to the New General Catalogue by John Louis Emil Dreyer.

=== Misclassification of NGC 6810 ===
This galaxy used to be classified as a Seyfert 2 galaxy, but that is probably incorrect. Recent X-ray observations provide no evidence of any active galactic nucleus (AGN) activity, and high resolution optical spectra do not confirm the status of NGC 6810 as a Seyfert galaxy, thus it appears to have been misclassified.

== Features ==
NGC 6810 is an early-type spiral of roughly equivalent mass to the Milky Way. X-ray, optical, IR and radio properties of NGC 6810 are all consistent with a starburst galaxy.

=== Galactic-scale superwind ===
Observation of NGC 6810 with XMM-Newton reveals the presence of extended soft X-ray emission within the optical disc of the galaxy (which is closely associated with star-forming regions) and also beyond the optical disc. This, along with Hα filamentation and peculiar minor axis ionized gas kinematics, strongly suggest that NGC 6810 is host to a galactic-scale superwind which is streaming from the starburst region.

The actively star-forming regions and the base radius of the outflow are unusually spread out, and extend out to a radius of ~6.5 kpc from the nucleus. Most superwinds in other galaxies appear to arise in ≲ 1 kpc-scale nuclear starburst regions. That makes NGC 6810 one of the few ‘disc-wide’ superwinds currently known, because NGC 6810's superwind base extends across nearly 70 percent of the entire galaxy's diameter. Only three other starburst galaxies are known to have broad superwind sources.

== See also ==
- List of NGC objects (6001–7000)
