= HD 189567 =

Star in the constellation Pavo

- Location of HD 189567 (circled)

Observation data Epoch J2000.0 Equinox J2000.0 (ICRS)
- Constellation: Pavo
- Right ascension: 20^{h} 05^{m} 32.76549^{s}
- Declination: −67° 19′ 15.2261″
- Apparent magnitude (V): 6.07

Characteristics
- Evolutionary stage: Main sequence
- Spectral type: G3V
- Apparent magnitude (U): 6.79
- Apparent magnitude (B): 6.71
- Apparent magnitude (V): 6.07
- Apparent magnitude (J): 5.108±0.266
- Apparent magnitude (H): 4.724±0.076
- Apparent magnitude (K): 4.511±0.026

Astrometry
Radial velocity (R_{v})	−10.548±0.0003 km/s
Proper motion (μ)	RA: 845.252±0.016 mas/yr Dec.: −674.213±0.024 mas/yr
Parallax (π)	55.7654±0.0245 mas
Distance	58.49 ± 0.03 ly (17.932 ± 0.008 pc)
Absolute magnitude (M_{V})	4.75

Details
Mass	0.83±0.01 M_{☉}
Radius	1.1 R_{☉}
Luminosity	2.11 L_{☉}
Surface gravity (log g)	4.41±0.01 cgs
Temperature	5,726±15 K
Metallicity [Fe/H]	−0.24±0.01 dex
Rotation	38.8 days
Rotational velocity (v sin i)	2.0 km/s
Age	11.0±0.5 Gyr; 7.23±2.99 Gyr; 4.11 Gyr

Other designations
- CD−67 2385, CPD−67 3703, GJ 776, HD 189567, HIP 98959, HR 7644, SAO 254721, PPM 364390, Ci 20 1180, LFT 1512, LHS 484, LPM 720, LTT 7928, NLTT 48618, PLX 4738, PM 20006-6727, TYC 9098-1638-1, GCRV 12398, GSC 09098-01638, IRAS 20006-6727, 2MASS J20053286-6719156

Database references
SIMBAD	data

HD 189567 is a star with a pair of orbiting exoplanets, located in the southern constellation of Pavo. It is also known as Gliese 776, CD-67 2385, and HR 7644. The star has an apparent visual magnitude of 6.07, which is bright enough for it to be dimly visible to the naked eye. It lies at a distance of 58 light years from the Sun based on parallax measurements, but is drifting closer with a radial velocity of −10.5 km/s.

The spectrum of HD 189567 presents as an ordinary G-type main-sequence star with a stellar classification of G3V. It has 83% of the mass of the Sun but 110% of the Sun's radius. The star is moderately depleted in heavy elements, having 55% of the solar abundance of iron, but is less depleted in oxygen, having 80% of its solar abundance. It has a low level of magnetic activity in its chromosphere. Age estimates range from 4.11 Gyr based on chromospheric heating to 11.26 Gyr from stellar rotation. The star is radiating 2.1 times the luminosity of the Sun from its photosphere at an effective temperature of 5,726 K.

== Planetary system ==
One exoplanet was discovered around the star in 2011, HD 189567 b. This exoplanet has an estimated minimum mass of 8.5 Earth masses, which means that it is most likely a mini-Neptune. It has an orbital period of 14.3 days, placing it well interior to the habitable zone of the star system. The planet's existence was confirmed in 2021, along with the discovery of a second planet, HD 189567 c.

The HD 189567 planetary system
Companion (in order from star)	Mass	Semimajor axis (AU)	Orbital period (days)	Eccentricity	Inclination (°)	Radius
b	≥8.5±0.6 M_{🜨}	0.111±0.002	14.288±0.002	<0.189	—	—
c	≥7.0±0.9 M_{🜨}	0.197±0.003	33.688±0.025	0.16±0.09	—	—
