= Theta Pavonis =

A-type main sequence star in the constellation Pavo

θ Pavonis
- Location of θ Pavonis (circled)

Observation data Epoch J2000 Equinox ICRS
- Constellation: Pavo
- Right ascension: 18^{h} 48^{m} 37.90451^{s}
- Declination: −65° 04′ 39.6498″
- Apparent magnitude (V): 5.71

Characteristics
- Evolutionary stage: main sequence
- Spectral type: A8V
- B−V color index: +0.268±0.004

Astrometry
Radial velocity (R_{v})	−0.7±4.3 km/s
Proper motion (μ)	RA: −38.266 mas/yr Dec.: −78.246 mas/yr
Parallax (π)	15.3252±0.0741 mas
Distance	213 ± 1 ly (65.3 ± 0.3 pc)
Absolute magnitude (M_{V})	1.56

Details
Mass	1.56 M_{☉}
Radius	2.51+0.09 −0.13 R_{☉}
Luminosity	17.4±0.1 L_{☉}
Surface gravity (log g)	3.94±0.14 cgs
Temperature	7,453+199 −136 K
Metallicity [Fe/H]	+0.01 dex
Rotational velocity (v sin i)	245 km/s
Age	425 Myr

Other designations
- θ Pav, CPD−65°3754, GC 25706, HD 173168, HIP 92294, HR 7036, SAO 254374

Database references
SIMBAD	data

Theta Pavonis is a single star in the southern constellation of Pavo. Its name is a Bayer designation that is Latinized from θ Pavonis, and abbreviated Theta Pav or θ Pav. It is just visible to the naked eye as a dim, white-hued star, having an apparent visual magnitude of 5.71. This star is located 213 light years from the Sun based on parallax.

This object is an A-type main-sequence star with a stellar classification of A8V, which indicates it is generating energy through hydrogen fusion at its core. It displays little to no detectable X-ray emission, suggesting a weak corona and, at best, a shallow convection zone. Theta Pavonis is 425 million years old and is spinning rapidly with a projected rotational velocity of 245 km/s. The star has 1.56 times the mass of the Sun and 2.51 times the Sun's radius. It is radiating 17.4 times the luminosity of the Sun from its photosphere at an effective temperature of 7,453 K.

It lies six arc-minutes north of the barred lenticular galaxy NGC 6684.
