= Rho Pavonis =

Variable star in the constellation Pavo

- Location of ρ Pavonis (circled)

Observation data Epoch J2000 Equinox J2000
- Constellation: Pavo
- Right ascension: 20^{h} 37^{m} 35.31275^{s}
- Declination: −61° 31′ 47.7145″
- Apparent magnitude (V): 4.85 – 4.91

Characteristics
- Spectral type: Fm δ Del
- U−B color index: +0.19
- B−V color index: +0.43
- Variable type: δ Sct

Astrometry
Radial velocity (R_{v})	+8.0±0.8 km/s
Proper motion (μ)	RA: +59.61 mas/yr Dec.: −72.69 mas/yr
Parallax (π)	17.20±0.24 mas
Distance	190 ± 3 ly (58.1 ± 0.8 pc)
Absolute magnitude (M_{V})	1.04

Details
Radius	4.33+0.39 −0.17 R_{☉}
Luminosity	34.1±0.8 L_{☉}
Temperature	6,704+136 −285 K
Rotational velocity (v sin i)	45.0 km/s

Other designations
- ρ Pav, CPD−61°6495, FK5 3647, GC 28668, HD 195961, HIP 101773, HR 7859, SAO 254835

Database references
SIMBAD	data

Rho Pavonis, Latinized from ρ Pavonis, is a single, variable star in the southern constellation of Pavo. It is yellow-white in hue and faintly visible to the naked eye with an apparent visual magnitude that fluctuates around 4.9. The star is located at a distance of approximately 190 light years from the Sun based on parallax, and is drifting further away with a radial velocity of +8 km/s. It is a candidate outlying member of the Tucana Association of co-moving stars.

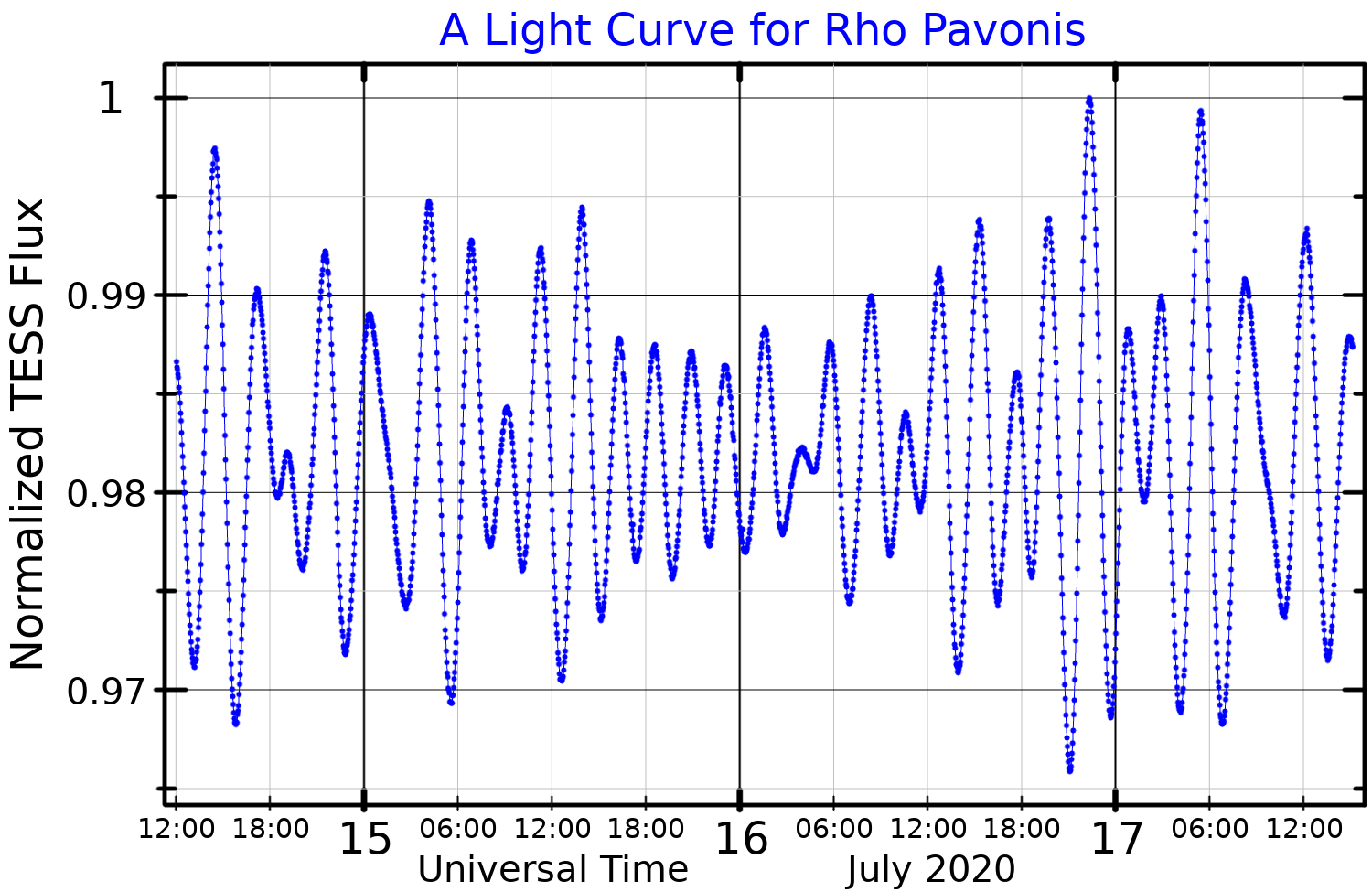
A light curve for Rho Pavonis, plotted from TESS data

This is a metallic-line star with a stellar classification of Fm δ Del, where the suffix notation indicating it is a δ Delphini star. It is a Delta Scuti variable, varying in brightness by 0.03 magnitudes. The dominant pulsation period is 2.74 hours, but the effects of other pulsation periods are apparent in the light curve. The star has 4.3 times the girth of the Sun and is spinning with a projected rotational velocity of 45 km/s. It is radiating 34 times the luminosity of the Sun from its photosphere at an effective temperature of 6,704 K.
