= HD 181433 b =

Super-Earth orbiting HD 181433

Discovery
- Discovered by: Bouchy et al.
- Discovery site: La Silla Observatory, Chile
- Discovery date: June 16, 2008
- Detection method: Doppler spectroscopy

Orbital characteristics
- Apastron: 0.111 AU (16,600,000 km)
- Periastron: 0.048 AU (7,200,000 km)
- Semi-major axis: 0.080 AU (12,000,000 km)
- Eccentricity: 0.396
- Orbital period (sidereal): 9.3743 d
- Average orbital speed: 93
- Time of periastron: 2454542 ± 0.26
- Argument of periastron: 202 ± 10
- Star: HD 181433

HD 181433 b is an extrasolar planet located approximately 87 light years away in the constellation of Pavo, orbiting the star HD 181433. This planet has mass at least 7.56 times that of Earth. This planet is classified as a super-Earth and orbits at 0.080 AU and varies only about 0.063 AU with an eccentricity of 0.396. François Bouchy et al. have published a paper detailing the HD 181433 planetary system in Astronomy and Astrophysics.
