= Iota Pavonis =

Star in the constellation Pavo

- Location of ι Pavonis (circled)

Observation data Epoch J2000 Equinox ICRS
- Constellation: Pavo
- Right ascension: 18^{h} 10^{m} 26.15370^{s}
- Declination: −62° 00′ 07.9922″
- Apparent magnitude (V): 5.47

Characteristics
- Spectral type: G0V
- Apparent magnitude (B): 6.07
- Apparent magnitude (J): 4.43±0.31
- Apparent magnitude (H): 4.02±0.24
- Apparent magnitude (K): 4.130±0.266

Astrometry
Radial velocity (R_{v})	30.20±0.14 km/s
Proper motion (μ)	RA: −76.952±0.159 mas/yr Dec.: 222.452±0.188 mas/yr
Parallax (π)	56.1961±0.2674 mas
Distance	58.0 ± 0.3 ly (17.79 ± 0.08 pc)
Absolute magnitude (M_{V})	4.24±0.02

Orbit
Period (P)	8304.32±15.34 d
Semi-major axis (a)	8.56+0.29 −0.31 au
Eccentricity (e)	0.43430±0.00160
Inclination (i)	79.55+0.59 −0.60°
Argument of periastron (ω) (secondary)	203.74+0.38 −0.40°
Semi-amplitude (K_{1}) (primary)	1.355±0.003 km/s

Details

ι Pavonis A
Mass	1.03+0.10 −0.06 M_{☉}
Radius	1.26+0.02 −0.03 R_{☉}
Luminosity	1.85+0.13 −0.11 L_{☉}
Surface gravity (log g)	4.29±0.07 cgs
Temperature	5951±29 K
Metallicity [Fe/H]	−0.07±0.06 dex
Rotational velocity (v sin i)	2.5 km/s
Age	7.221+2.747 −1.990 Gyr

ι Pavonis B
Mass	141±10 M_{Jup}

Other designations
- ι Pav, CD−62 1190, GJ 9616, HD 165499, HIP 89042, HR 6761, SAO 254157, LTT 7205, 2MASS J18102614-6200078

Database references
SIMBAD	data

Iota Pavonis (Latinized from ι Pavonis) is a binary star in the southern constellation of Pavo. It is located at a distance of 58.0 light-years (17.79 parsecs) from the Sun based on its parallax. It has an apparent visual magnitude of 5.47, making it very faintly visible to the naked eye from the southern hemisphere.

Iota Pavonis consists of a solar-type primary star and a low-mass stellar companion detected by radial velocity and astrometry.

== Nomenclature ==
ι Pavonis (Latinized to Iota Pavonis) is the star's Bayer designation, abbreviated Iota Pav or ι Pav. It is also known by its Henry Draper Catalogue designation HD 165499, as well as several other catalogue designations.

== Properties ==
The primary star has a stellar classification of G0 V, indicating that it is a G-type main sequence star. It is similar to the Sun, having a similar mass, slightly hotter effective temperature, and slightly lower metallicity; but is somewhat larger and more luminous. At an age of about 7 billion years, it is significantly older than the Sun.

Radial velocity and astrometric measurements suggest that the low-mass stellar companion has a mass of around 0.13 solar masses, and orbits the primary star in a moderately eccentric orbit at a distance of around 9 AU.

Iota Pavonis is not listed in the Washington Double Star Catalog, and hence is included in the NASA Exoplanet Exploration Program (ExEP) Mission Star List (EMSL), despite the separation between the two stars being less than 1 arcsecond, whereas the EMSL intended to exclude binaries with stellar companion separated by less than 3 arcseconds.

== See also ==
- Mu Arae
