= NU Pavonis =

Red giant star in the constellation Pavo

- Location of NU Pavonis (circled)

Observation data Epoch J2000 Equinox ICRS
- Constellation: Pavo
- Right ascension: 20^{h} 01^{m} 44.74541^{s}
- Declination: −59° 22′ 33.2173″
- Apparent magnitude (V): 4.91 – 5.26

Characteristics
- Evolutionary stage: AGB
- Spectral type: M6 III
- B−V color index: 1.356±0.011
- Variable type: SRb

Astrometry
Radial velocity (R_{v})	−10.3±2.8 km/s
Proper motion (μ)	RA: +20.22 mas/yr Dec.: −27.05 mas/yr
Parallax (π)	6.86±0.26 mas
Distance	480 ± 20 ly (146 ± 6 pc)
Absolute magnitude (M_{V})	−0.86

Details
Mass	3.7 M_{☉}
Radius	204±29 R_{☉}
Luminosity	5,720±960 L_{☉}
Surface gravity (log g)	0.87 cgs
Temperature	3,516±275 K
Metallicity [Fe/H]	−0.28 dex

Other designations
- NU Pav, CD−59°7361, FK5 3598, HD 189124, HIP 98608, HR 7625, SAO 246389

Database references
SIMBAD	data

NU Pavonis (N-U, not "nu") is a variable star in the southern constellation of Pavo. With an apparent visual magnitude of about 5, it is a faint star but visible to the naked eye. The distance to NU Pav, as determined from its annual parallax shift of 6.9 mas as seen from Earth's orbit, is around 480 light years. It is moving closer with a heliocentric radial velocity of −10 km/s.

It was designated Lambda^{2} Indi (λ^{2} Ind) by Nicolas Louis de Lacaille before its designation was dropped.

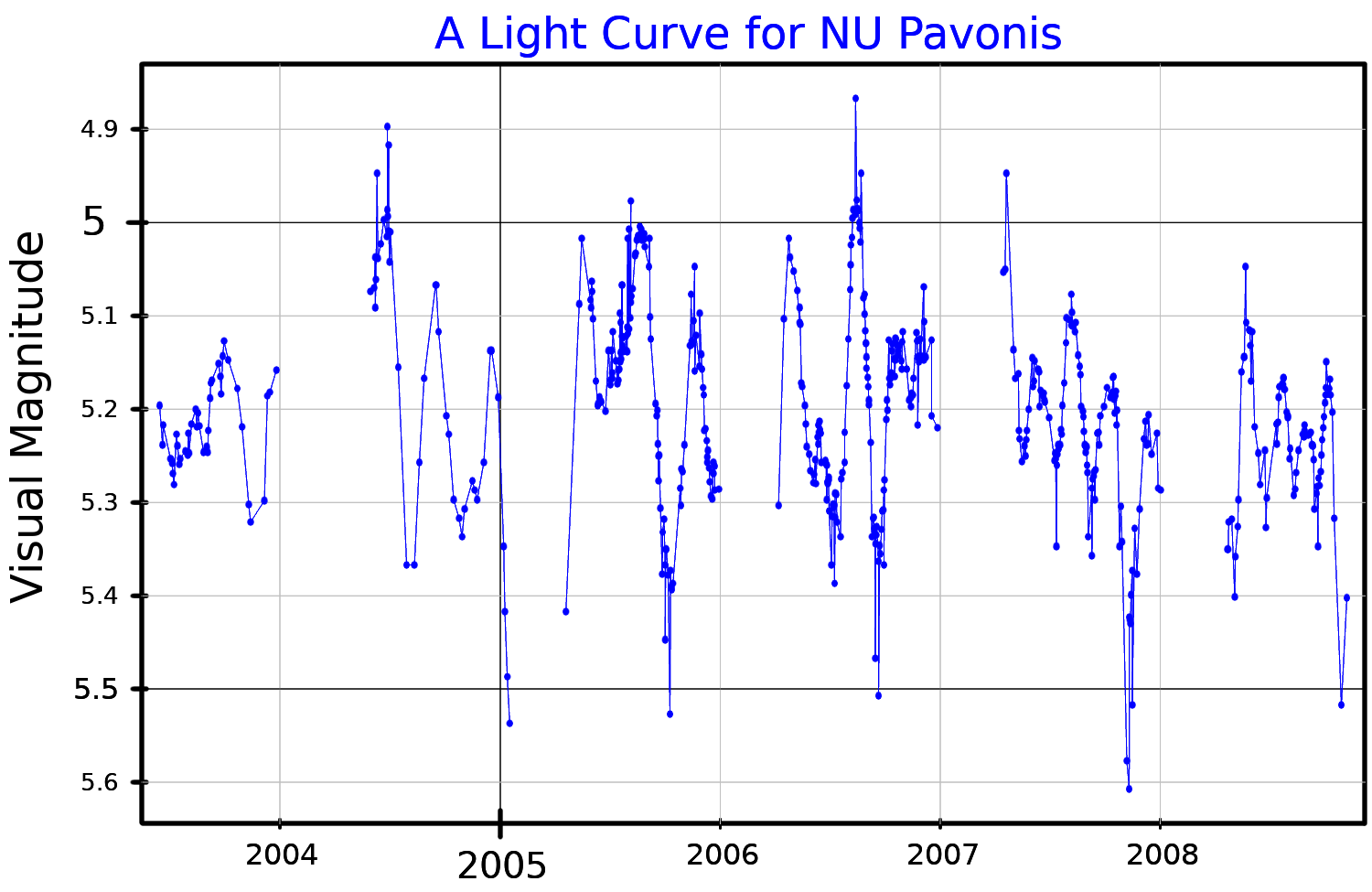
A visual band light curve for NU Pavonis, plotted from data published by Tabur et al. (2009)

This is an aging red giant with a stellar classification of M6 III, currently on the asymptotic giant branch. Peter M. Corben listed HR 7625 as a possible variable star in 1971. It was given its variable star designation, NU Pavonis, in 1973. It is a semiregular variable star of sub-type SRb that ranges in magnitude from 4.91 down to 5.26 with a period of 60 days. The star has expanded to 204 times the Sun's radius and is radiating 7,412 times the Sun's luminosity from its enlarged photosphere at an effective temperature of 3,516 K.

Far-ultraviolet emission has been detected from the position of this star, which may be coming from a companion star.
