= SCR 1845−6357 =

Star in the constellation Pavo

- Location of SCR 1845−6357 in the constellation Pavo

Observation data Epoch J2000.0 (ICRS) Equinox ICRS
- Constellation: Pavo
- Right ascension: 18^{h} 45^{m} 05.25325^{s}
- Declination: −63° 57′ 47.4501″
- Apparent magnitude (V): 17.4

Characteristics

SCR 1845−6357 A
- Spectral type: M8.5

SCR 1845−6357 B
- Spectral type: T6
- Apparent magnitude (J): 13.26

Astrometry
Proper motion (μ)	RA: 2583.190 mas/yr Dec.: 588.504 mas/yr
Parallax (π)	249.6651±0.1330 mas
Distance	13.064 ± 0.007 ly (4.005 ± 0.002 pc)

Details

SCR 1845−6357 A
Mass	0.0753±0.0088 M_{☉}
Radius	0.0941±0.0039 R_{☉}
Luminosity	(2.649±0.026)×10^{−4} L_{☉}
Surface gravity (log g)	5.0 cgs
Temperature	2,400 K

SCR 1845−6357 B
Mass	0.024 to 0.062 M_{☉}
Mass	25 to 65 M_{Jup}
Radius	0.7±0.1 R_{Jup}
Luminosity	5.25+1.06 −0.88×10^{−6} L_{☉}
Surface gravity (log g)	5.1 cgs
Temperature	1,000±100 K
Age	≥1.5 Gyr

Position (relative to A)
Epoch of observation	J2006.3
Angular distance	1.064 ± 0.004″
Position angle	177.2 ± 0.06°
Projected separation	4.10 ± 0.04 AU

Other designations
- GJ 12724, SCR J1845−6357, 2MASS J18450541-6357475, DENIS J184504.9-635747, SCR 1845

Database references
SIMBAD	A
- B

SCR 1845−6357 is a binary system, 13.1 light-years (4.0 parsecs) away in the constellation Pavo. The primary is a low-mass red dwarf and the secondary is a brown dwarf. It is one of the nearest stellar systems, as well as the closest red dwarf-brown dwarf binary.

== System ==
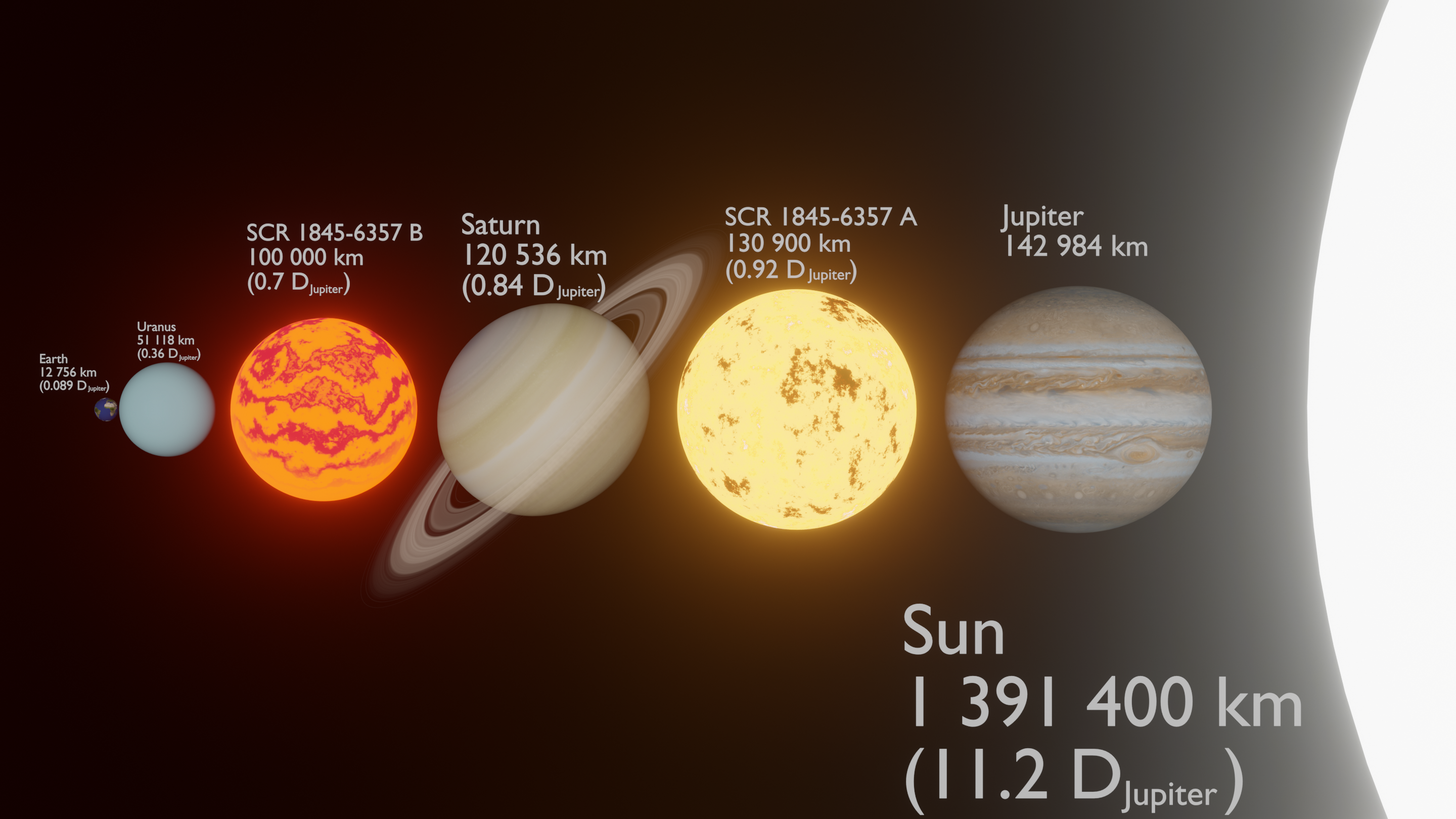
Size comparison of SCR 1845−6357 A and B, compared to Solar System objects

The primary, SCR 1845−6357 A, is an ultra-cool red dwarf, one of the smallest and coolest stars so far discovered, with a mass of about 7% of the Sun's, a radius 9.4% of the Sun's, and an effective temperature of 2,400 K (2,100 °C; 3,900 °F). It is very faint, at an apparent magnitude of 17.4 due to its low luminosity, equivalent to 0.03% of the Sun's luminosity across all wavelengths. It was discovered in 2004 by the SuperCOSMOS survey.

This star has been found to have a brown dwarf companion in 2006, designated SCR 1845−6357 B. The companion has an observed distance of 4.1 AU from the primary and is classified as a T-dwarf. It is estimated to have 25 to 65 times the mass of Jupiter (2.4 to 6.2% of the Sun's mass), but its radius is 30% smaller than that of Jupiter, about 50,000 km (31,000 miles). It has an effective temperature around 1,000 K (730 °C; 1,300 °F).

== Gallery ==
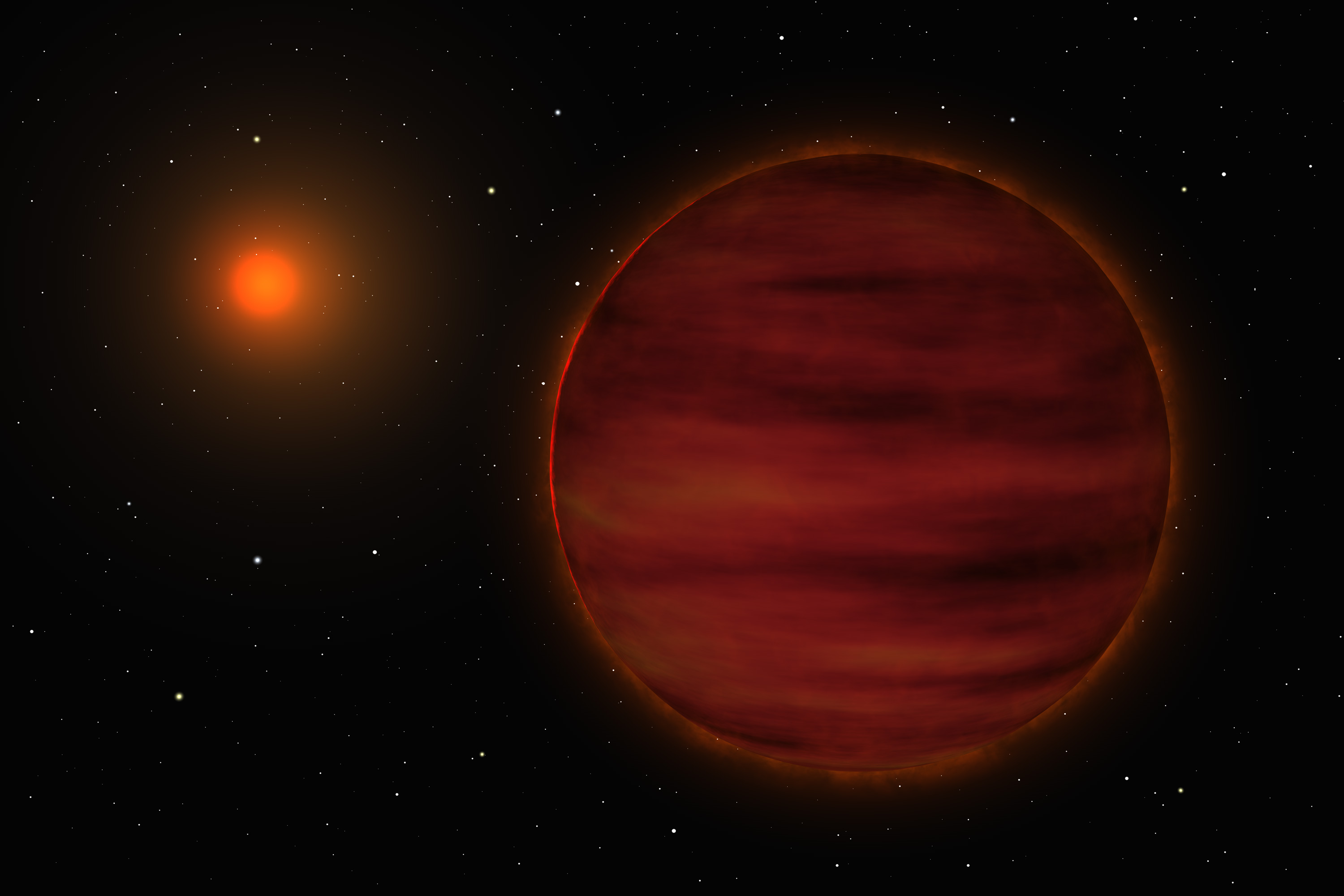
Artist's impression of the SCR 1845−6357 stellar system

SCR 1845−6357, right bottom

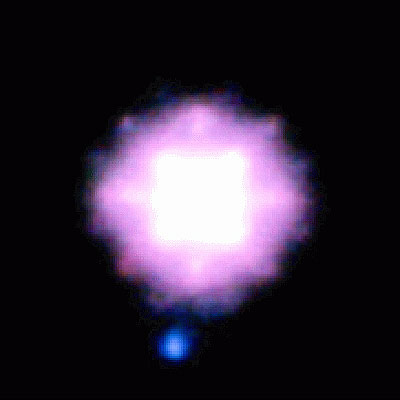
Three-colour image of SCR1845−6357AB generated from the SDI filter images (blue=1.575 μm, green=1.600 μm, red=1.625 μm). Because the T-dwarf fades away towards the longer wavelengths, it appears quite blue in this image. It is roughly 50 times fainter than the star and is separated from it by an angle of 1.17″ on the sky (4.5 times the Earth-Sun distance).

== See also ==
- OTS 44
- Cha 110913−773444
