= HD 181433 =

K-type star in the constellation Pavo

Observation data Epoch J2000.0 Equinox ICRS
- Constellation: Pavo
- Right ascension: 19^{h} 25^{m} 09.567^{s}
- Declination: −66° 28′ 07.68″
- Apparent magnitude (V): 8.40

Characteristics
- Evolutionary stage: subgiant
- Spectral type: K3III-IV
- B−V color index: 1.006±0.045

Astrometry
Radial velocity (R_{v})	+40.144±0.0003 km/s
Proper motion (μ)	RA: –230.723 mas/yr Dec.: 235.806 mas/yr
Parallax (π)	37.0511±0.0211 mas
Distance	88.03 ± 0.05 ly (26.99 ± 0.02 pc)
Absolute magnitude (M_{V})	6.26

Details
Mass	0.869+0.042 −0.041 M_{☉}
Radius	0.80±0.02 R_{☉}
Luminosity	0.34±0.01 L_{☉}
Surface gravity (log g)	4.55±0.02 cgs
Temperature	4,909±20 K
Metallicity [Fe/H]	0.33 dex
Rotational velocity (v sin i)	1.588±0.072 km/s
Age	6.7±1.8 Gyr; 7.4±3.4 Gyr

Other designations
- CD−66°2307, GJ 756.1, HD 181433, HIP 95467, SAO 254563, PPM 363979, LTT 7669

Database references
SIMBAD	data
Exoplanet Archive	data
ARICNS	data

HD 181433 is a star with a system of orbiting exoplanets located in the southern constellation of Pavo (the Peacock). With an apparent visual magnitude of 8.40, it is too faint to be visible to the naked eye. It lies at a distance of 88 light years from the Sun based on parallax measurements, and is drifting further away with a radial velocity of +40 km/s. The system shows a high proper motion, traversing the celestial sphere at an angular rate of 0.340 arcsec yr^{−1}.

This K-type star has a stellar classification of K3III-IV, which presents it as an evolved star with mixed traits of a red giant and a subgiant. G. Campanella and associates list a class of K3IV. These are inconsistent with the fact that its luminosity is only 0.34 times that of the Sun. Its entry in the Hipparcos catalogue lists a spectral type of K5V, classifying it as an ordinary K-type main-sequence star, an orange dwarf.

HD 181433 is an older star with age estimates of around 7 billion years. It is smaller than the Sun, with 84% of the Sun's mass and 80% of the radius. This star is spinning with a projected rotational velocity of 1.6 km/s. The effective temperature of the stellar atmosphere is 4,909 K.

== Planetary system ==
Orbiting the star are three planets, whose discovery was announced in 2008; the discovery paper was published in 2009. The inner planet has a mass at least 7 times that of Earth, and is considered to be a super-Earth (this classification is based solely on the mass of the planet and should not be taken to imply that the planet could support Earthlike conditions). The middle planet and the outer planet are gas giants. The orbital periods for three planets are 9.3743 days for a 7.56 M_{E} planet, 962 days for a 0.64 M_{J} planet, and 2172 days for a 0.54 M_{J} planet. This solution is unstable, more data are required to constrain the orbital position of planet d. An updated orbital solution in 2019, provided in the table below, refined the masses and orbital elements and found a dynamically stable solution. In 2025, the use of astrometry allowed the inclination and true mass of planet d to be found. The astrometric solution also implies a semi-major axis 56% larger than previously found, although the values are plagued by high uncertainties.

The HD 181433 planetary system (Note: HD 181433 b: HD 181433 c mass and semi-major axis, and HD 181433 d:)
Companion (in order from star)	Mass	Semimajor axis (AU)	Orbital period (days)	Eccentricity	Inclination (°)	Radius
b	≥ 7.09±0.10 M_{🜨}	0.0801±0.0001	9.3745±0.0002	0.336±0.014	—	—
c	≥0.75±0.03 M_{J}	1.90±0.03	1,014.5±0.6	0.235±0.003	—	—
d	2.7+1.7 −2.0 M_{J}	10.3+3.9 −2.6	12,800+8,000 −4,400	0.64+0.11 −0.12	165+7 −53	—

== See also ==
- HD 40307
- HD 47186
- MOA-2007-BLG-192L
