= Phi1 Pavonis =

Single star in the constellation Pavo

φ^{1} Pavonis
- Location of φ^{1} Pavonis (circled)

Observation data Epoch J2000 Equinox ICRS
- Constellation: Pavo
- Right ascension: 20^{h} 35^{m} 34.85007^{s}
- Declination: −60° 34′ 54.2968″
- Apparent magnitude (V): 4.75

Characteristics
- Evolutionary stage: main sequence
- Spectral type: F0V
- U−B color index: +0.04
- B−V color index: +0.29

Astrometry
Radial velocity (R_{v})	−20.0±4.2 km/s
Proper motion (μ)	RA: +69.912 mas/yr Dec.: −185.861 mas/yr
Parallax (π)	35.6214±0.0982 mas
Distance	91.6 ± 0.3 ly (28.07 ± 0.08 pc)
Absolute magnitude (M_{V})	2.53

Details
Mass	1.51 M_{☉}
Radius	1.76 R_{☉}
Luminosity	7.8 L_{☉}
Surface gravity (log g)	4.16 cgs
Temperature	7,273 K
Rotational velocity (v sin i)	150.0 km/s
Age	30+230 −10 Myr

Other designations
- phi^{1} Pav, CPD−61°6492, GC 28609, HD 195627, HIP 101612, HR 7848, SAO 254823

Database references
SIMBAD	data

Phi^{1} Pavonis, latinized from φ^{1} Pavonis, is a single star in the southern constellation of Pavo. It has a yellow-white hue and is faintly visible to the naked eye with an apparent visual magnitude of 4.75. The star is located at a distance of approximately 92 light years away based on parallax. It is drifting closer to the Sun with a radial velocity of −20 km/s.

This is an ordinary F-type main-sequence star with a stellar classification of F0V. It has 1.5 times the mass of the Sun and 1.8 times the Sun's radius. This is a young star, perhaps 30 million years old, and has a high rate of spin with a projected rotational velocity of 150 km/s. It is radiating 7.8 times the luminosity of the Sun from its photosphere at an effective temperature of 7,273 K.

Phi^{1} Pavonis is a candidate debris disk star, although Gray et al. (2006) reported a non-detection of an infrared excess. Nilsson et al. (2010) report a marginal detection, orbiting 74 AU from the host star with a temperature of 57 K and an estimated 3.1±1.7 times the mass of the Moon.
