= Pi Pavonis =

Binary star in the constellation Pavo

- Location of π Pavonis (circled)

Observation data Epoch J2000 Equinox J2000
- Constellation: Pavo
- Right ascension: 18^{h} 08^{m} 34.81459^{s}
- Declination: −63° 40′ 06.7906″
- Apparent magnitude (V): 4.33

Characteristics
- Spectral type: kA4hF0mF2 III + KV
- U−B color index: +0.17
- B−V color index: +0.23

Astrometry
Radial velocity (R_{v})	−15.60 km/s
Proper motion (μ)	RA: +18.02 mas/yr Dec.: -207.57 mas/yr
Parallax (π)	25.09±0.17 mas
Distance	130.0 ± 0.9 ly (39.9 ± 0.3 pc)
Absolute magnitude (M_{V})	1.33

Details

A
Mass	1.80 M_{☉}
Radius	2.80 R_{☉}
Luminosity	24.69±0.36 L_{☉}
Surface gravity (log g)	3.81 cgs
Temperature	7,560 K
Metallicity [Fe/H]	0.27 dex
Rotational velocity (v sin i)	30.0 km/s
Age	1.4 Gyr

B
Mass	0.76 M_{☉}
Radius	0.70 R_{☉}
Temperature	4,710 K

Position (relative to A)
Component	B
Angular distance	959 mas
Projected separation	39.3 AU

Other designations
- π Pav, CPD−63°4292, FK5 3437, GC 24665, HD 165040, HIP 88866, HR 6745, SAO 254147

Database references
SIMBAD	data

π Pavonis, Latinized as Pi Pavonis, is a binary star in the constellation Pavo. It is a white-hued star that is visible to the naked eye as a faint point of light with an apparent visual magnitude of 4.33. The distance to this object is 130 light years based on parallax, but it is drifting closer to the Sun with a radial velocity of −15.6 km/s.

The primary component is an chemically peculiar star that displays an abundance anomaly of strontium. Gray & Garrison (1989) classify it as kA4hF0mF2 III, matching a giant Am star with the calcium K line of an A4 star, the hydrogen lines of a cooler F0 star, and the metal lines of a F2 star. However, Loden and Sundman (1989) don't consider it to be a giant and list it as an Ap star. It is 1.4 billion years old with 1.8 times the mass of the Sun and 2.8 times the Sun's radius. The star is radiating 24.7 times the Sun's luminosity from its photosphere at an effective temperature of 7,560 K.

The secondary is a K-type main-sequence star, much smaller than its primary, at 0.76 solar masses and 0.7 solar radii. It has an effective temperature 4,710 K and is 3.63 magnitudes fainter than the primary in the H band. They are separated by 39.3 astronomical units and have an estimated orbital period of 150 years.

There is evidence for another companion using Hipparcos-Gaia astrometry, which should be a star with less than 0.7 times the mass of the Sun, closer to the primary star.
