= Xi Pavonis =

Triple star system in the constellation Pavo

- Location of ξ Pavonis (circled)

Observation data Epoch J2000 Equinox ICRS
- Constellation: Pavo
- Right ascension: 18^{h} 23^{m} 13.64610^{s}
- Declination: −61° 29′ 37.9364″
- Apparent magnitude (V): 4.35

Characteristics
- Spectral type: K4III
- U−B color index: +1.55
- B−V color index: +1.46

Astrometry
Radial velocity (R_{v})	+12.2±0.9 km/s
Proper motion (μ)	RA: −5.985 mas/yr Dec.: −0.538 mas/yr
Parallax (π)	7.3600±0.3753 mas
Distance	440 ± 20 ly (136 ± 7 pc)
Absolute magnitude (M_{V})	−1.16

Orbit
Period (P)	2,214 d
Eccentricity (e)	0.26
Periastron epoch (T)	2,418,076.2 JD
Argument of periastron (ω) (secondary)	187.2°
Semi-amplitude (K_{1}) (primary)	17.9 km/s

Details
Radius	54.82+0.32 −3.92 R_{☉}
Luminosity	729±42 L_{☉}
Temperature	4,051+153 −117 K

Other designations
- GLE 2, ξ Pav, CPD−61°6140, FK5 686, GC 25045, HD 168339, HIP 90098, HR 6855, SAO 254226, CCDM J18232-6130AB, WDS J18232-6130AB

Database references
SIMBAD	data

ξ Pavonis, Latinised as Xi Pavonis, is a triple star system in the southern constellation of Pavo. It is visible to the naked eye as a faint star with a combined apparent visual magnitude of 4.35 The system is located approximately 440 light-years from the Sun based on parallax, and it is drifting further away with a radial velocity of +12 km/s.

This system forms the double star GLE 2, whose companion's magnitude is 8.6 with a 3.3″ angular separation, which was discovered by Australian amateur astronomer Walter Gale in 1894. The primary component is itself a single-lined spectroscopic binary with an orbital period of 6.06 years and an eccentricity of 0.26. The visible member of this inner pair is an aging giant star with a stellar classification of K4III.
