= HD 172555 =

Star in the constellation Pavo

- Location of HD 172555 (circled in red)

Observation data Epoch J2000.0 Equinox ICRS
- Constellation: Pavo
- Right ascension: 18^{h} 45^{m} 26.90098^{s}
- Declination: −64° 52′ 16.5348″
- Apparent magnitude (V): 4.77

Characteristics
- Spectral type: A5 IV/V, A7V

Astrometry
Radial velocity (R_{v})	2.80±0.24 km/s
Proper motion (μ)	RA: 31.952 mas/yr Dec.: -149.730 mas/yr
Parallax (π)	34.7355±0.1575 mas
Distance	93.9 ± 0.4 ly (28.8 ± 0.1 pc)
Absolute magnitude (M_{V})	+2.5

Details
Mass	2.0 M_{☉}
Radius	1.52 R_{☉}
Luminosity	9.5 L_{☉}
Temperature	8,000 K
Rotational velocity (v sin i)	175 km/s
Age	~12, ~20 Myr

Other designations
- CPD−64°3948, FK5 3489, GC 25604, HD 172555, HIP 92024, HR 7012, SAO 254358

Database references
SIMBAD	data

HD 172555 is a white-hot type A7V star located relatively close by, 94 light-years from Earth in the direction of the constellation Pavo. Spectrographic evidence indicates a relatively recent collision between two planet-sized bodies. Evidence of the collision was detected by NASA's Spitzer Space Telescope.

== Giant hypervelocity impact debris ==
HD 172555 was first recognized in the 1980s as being unusually bright in the mid-infrared by the IRAS sky survey. Follow-up ground-based observations by Schütz et al. and the Spitzer Space Telescope, also in 2004, confirmed the unusually strong nature of the infrared spectral emission from this system, much brighter than what would be emitted normally from the star's surface. As part of the Beta Pictoris moving group, HD 172555 is coeval with Beta Pictoris, approximately 20 million years old, and is the same kind of white-hot star as Beta Pic, about twice as massive as the Sun and about 9.5 times as luminous. Comparison with current planetary formation theories, and with the very similar Beta Pic system, suggests that HD 172555 is in the early stages of terrestrial (rocky) planet formation.

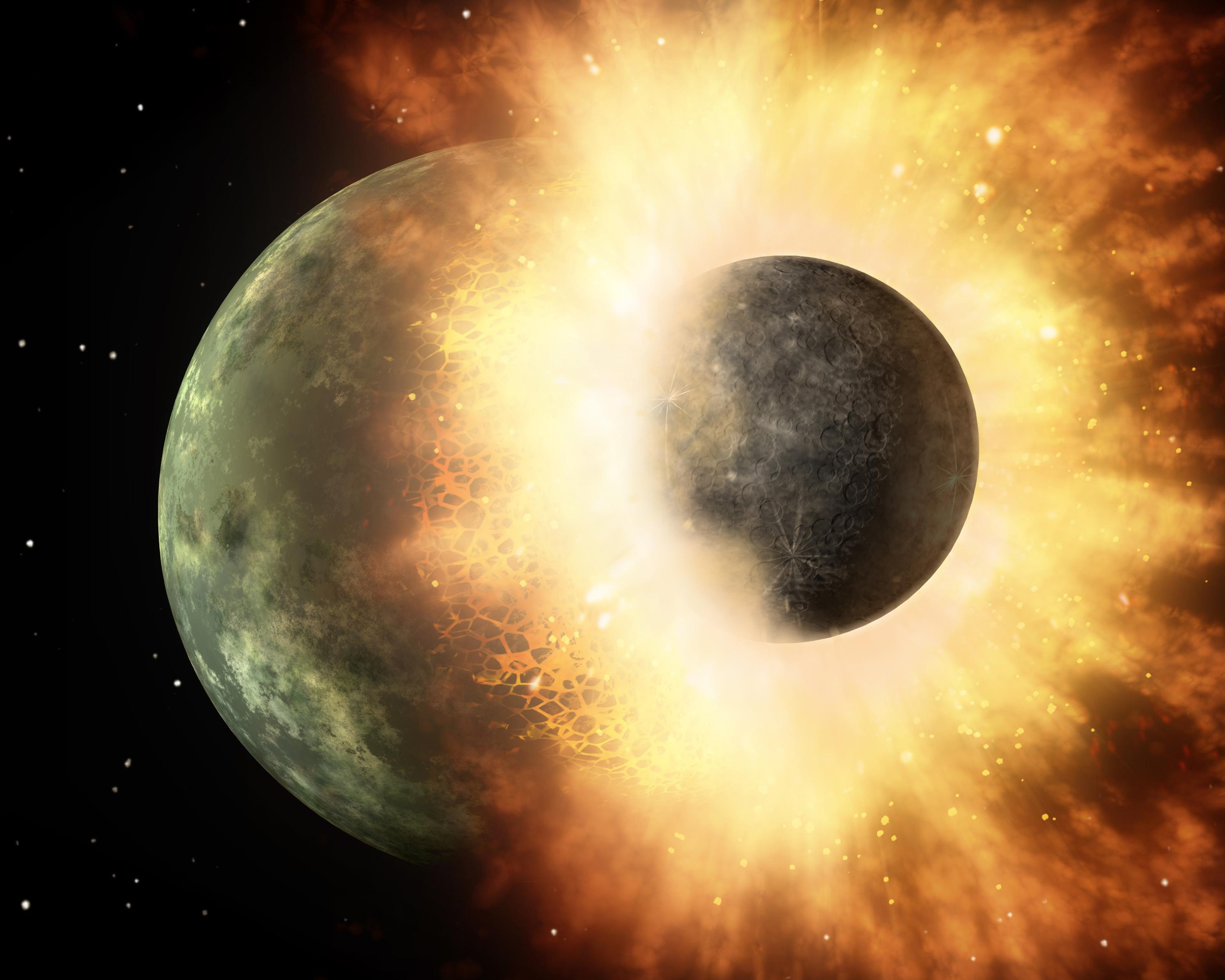
An artist's conception of a planetary collision around HD 172555.

What makes HD 172555 special is the presence of a large amount of unusual silicaceous material – amorphous silica and SiO gas – not the usual rocky materials, silicates like olivine and pyroxene, which make up much of the Earth as well. The material in the disk was analyzed in 2009 by Carey Lisse, of the Johns Hopkins University Applied Physics Laboratory in Laurel, MD using the infrared spectrometer on board the Spitzer Space Telescope, and the results of the Deep Impact and STARDUST comet missions. Analysis of the atomic and mineral composition, dust temperature, and dust mass show a massive (about a Moon's mass worth) amount of warm (about 340K) material similar to re-frozen lava (obsidian) and flash-frozen magma (tektite) as well as copious amounts of vaporized rock (silicon monoxide or SiO gas) and rubble (large dark pieces of dust) in a region at 5.8 ± 0.6 AU from the HD 172555 (inside the frost line of that system). The material had to have been created in a hypervelocity impact between two large bodies; relative velocities at impacts less than 10 km/s would not transform the ubiquitous olivine and pyroxene into silica and SiO gas. Giant impacts at this speed typically destroy the incident body, and melt the entire surface of the impactee.

The implications for the detection of abundant amorphous silica and SiO gas are the following:

- Massive hypervelocity impacts happen in young planetary systems. There are a number of examples of such impacts in the Solar System (Hartmann & Vail 1986): Mercury's high density; Venus' retrograde rotation; Earth's Moon; Mars' North/South hemispherical cratering anisotropy; Vesta's igneous origin (Drake 2001); Uranus' rotation axis located near the plane of the ecliptic. Local geological evidence for widespread impact melting includes tektites found on Earth and glass beads found in lunar soils (Warren 2008).
- Rocky protoplanets, and possibly planets, exist in the HD 172555 system, at about 20 Myr after its formation.
- If the collision happened within the last few thousand years, there is likely a protoplanet in the HD 172555 system with a liquid magma surface. This is not unexpected as a simple calculation of the gravitational binding energy of the Earth shows that the energy released in assembling the Earth is about 10 times the amount needed to melt it.

Follow-up VISNIR observations of the system published in 2020 have shown that the majority of observed fine dust is composed of very fine grains 1-4 micrometers diameter. as expected from a recent hypervelocity impact.

In 2021, a carbon monoxide ring at ~6 AU separation from the star was also found in the system by ALMA, further reinforcing a giant impact scenario for explaining the system's structure. The large amount of CO gas detected would likely have been sourced from the colliding planets' atmospheres.

In 2023, the possible detection of a transit of a cometary body with a radius of approximately 2.5 km, and at a distance of 0.05 AU from the star was announced.

In 2025 observations with JWST Mid-Infrared Instrument detected emission from an inner gaseous disk, caused by evaporating bodies. The observations detected neutral atomic chlorine and sulfur, as well as ionized nickel and iron. The sulfur was also detected in 20 year old Spitzer data, showing that the presence of sulfur is long-lived. The gas disk of HD 172555 was compared to Beta Pictoris. The researchers suggested that the gas disk comes from evaporating rocky bodies in HD 172555 and from evaporating volatile-rich bodies at a larger distance in Beta Pictoris. The researchers also found that the presence of cometary bodies from previous studies and the continued gas and dust production might hint at dynamical stirring, possibly caused by planets.

== See also ==
- List of extrasolar planetary collisions
- 2M1207b
