= Nu Pavonis =

Variable star in the constellation Pavo

- Location of 𝜈 Pavonis (circled)

Observation data Epoch J2000 Equinox ICRS
- Constellation: Pavo
- Right ascension: 18^{h} 31^{m} 22.42509^{s}
- Declination: −62° 16′ 41.8853″
- Apparent magnitude (V): 4.64 (4.60 - 4.64)

Characteristics
- Evolutionary stage: main sequence
- Spectral type: B7III
- U−B color index: −0.39
- B−V color index: −0.11
- Variable type: SPB

Astrometry
Radial velocity (R_{v})	+16.95 km/s
Proper motion (μ)	RA: −1.11 mas/yr Dec.: −45.31 mas/yr
Parallax (π)	7.43±0.24 mas
Distance	440 ± 10 ly (135 ± 4 pc)
Absolute magnitude (M_{V})	-1.01

Orbit
Period (P)	1.711529±0.000005 d
Eccentricity (e)	0.0
Periastron epoch (T)	2,450,276.5502±0.0007 HJD
Argument of periastron (ω) (secondary)	127±12°
Semi-amplitude (K_{1}) (primary)	43.8±0.1 km/s

Details
Mass	4.39 M_{☉}
Luminosity	659 L_{☉}
Temperature	12,764 K
Rotational velocity (v sin i)	125.0 km/s

Other designations
- ν Pav, CD−62°1213, GC 25227, HD 169978, HIP 90797, HR 6916, SAO 254273, WDS J18314-6217AB

Database references
SIMBAD	data

Nu Pavonis is a possible triple star system in the southern constellation of Pavo. It is visible to the naked eye as a faint star that varies in apparent visual magnitude from 4.60 to 4.64 over a period of 0.85584 days. The system lies approximately 440 light years from the Sun based on parallax, and is drifting further away with a radial velocity of +17 km/s. It is a possible member of the Wolf 630 group of co-moving stars.

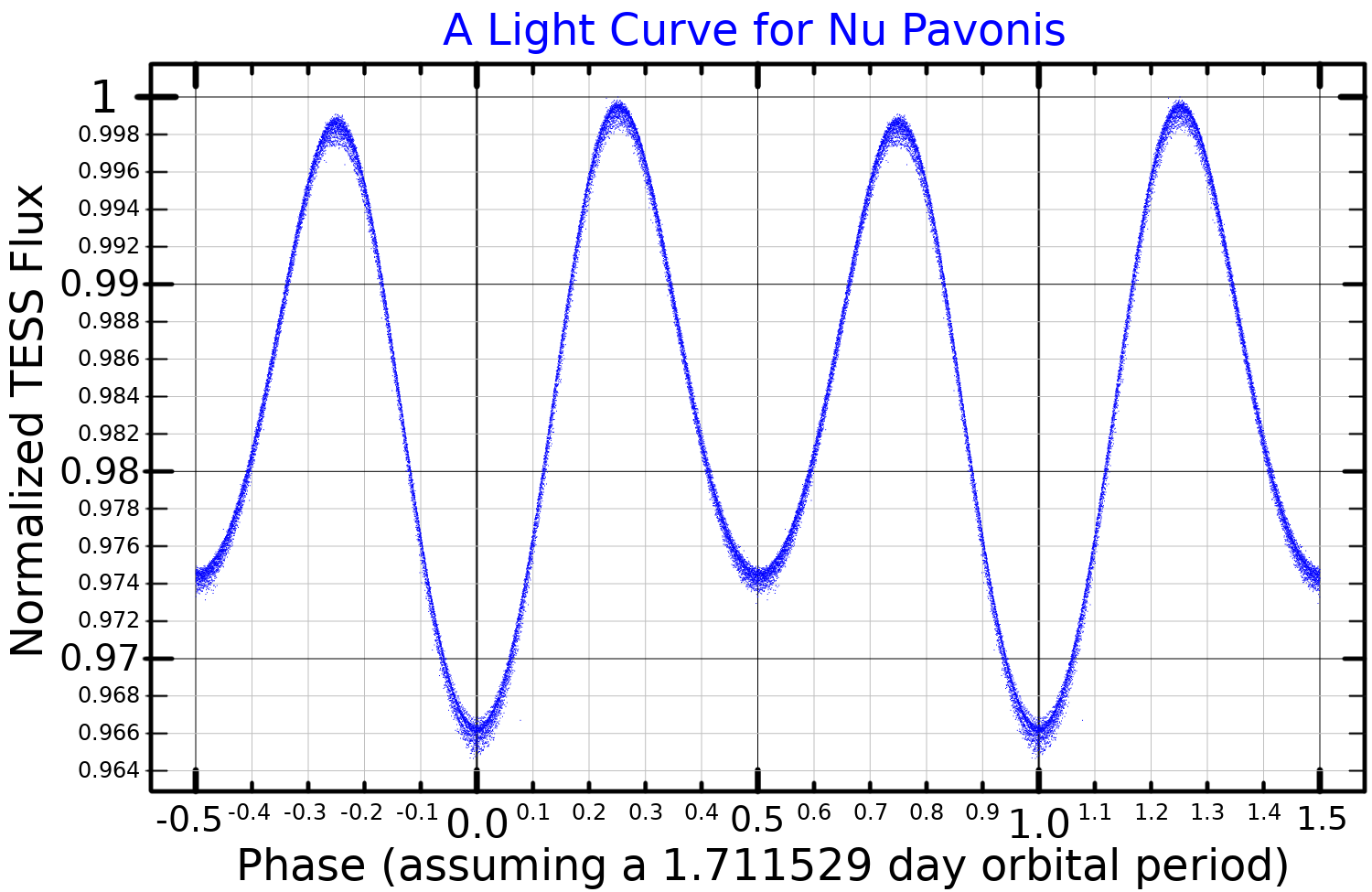
A light curve for Nu Pavonis, plotted from TESS data

This is a single-lined spectroscopic binary system with an orbital period of just 1.71 days in a circular orbit. The unresolved components are close enough that their tidal interaction is significant. Nu Pavonis was discovered to be a variable star when the Hipparcos data was analyzed. The visible component is a slowly pulsating B-type star with a stellar classification of B7III. This implies it is an evolved giant star, but it is actually more likely to be on the main sequence. An X-ray emission has been detected from the pair.

The third component is a visible companion, probably a pre-main-sequence star, at magnitude 13.7 and separation 3.1″. This star is estimated at 0.15 solar masses and an effective temperature of 3,192 K. It too is an X-ray source.
