= Zeta Pavonis =

Star in the constellation Pavo

ζ Pavonis
- Location of ζ Pavonis (circled)

Observation data Epoch J2000 Equinox ICRS
- Constellation: Pavo
- Right ascension: 18^{h} 43^{m} 02.13634^{s}
- Declination: −71° 25′ 41.2162″
- Apparent magnitude (V): +4.01

Characteristics
- Spectral type: K0III
- U−B color index: +1.02
- B−V color index: +1.13

Astrometry
Radial velocity (R_{v})	−16.30 km/s
Proper motion (μ)	RA: +1.186 mas/yr Dec.: −158.496 mas/yr
Parallax (π)	15.1495±0.1135 mas
Distance	215 ± 2 ly (66.0 ± 0.5 pc)
Absolute magnitude (M_{V})	−0.12

Details
Radius	18.47 R_{☉}
Luminosity	133 L_{☉}
Surface gravity (log g)	1.97±0.09 cgs
Temperature	4,514±50 K
Metallicity [Fe/H]	−0.44±0.04 dex
Rotational velocity (v sin i)	3.9±0.7 km/s

Other designations
- ζ Pav, CPD−71°2353, FK5 698, GC 25522, HD 171759, HIP 91792, HR 6982, SAO 257620, CCDM J18430-7125A, WDS J18430-7126A

Database references
SIMBAD	data

Zeta Pavonis is an orange-hued star in the southern constellation Pavo. Its name is a Bayer designation that is Latinized from ζ Pavonis, and abbreviated Zeta Pav or ζ Pav. Its apparent magnitude is 4.01, which is bright enough to be faintly visible to the naked eye. The annual parallax shift of this star is 15.15 mas as seen from Earth, which provides a distance of 215 light-years (66 parsecs). It is moving closer to the Sun with a radial velocity of −16.30. Based upon its motion through space, this star appears to be a member of the Hyades Supercluster.

This is an evolved K-type giant star with a stellar classification of K0 III, which indicates it has exhausted the supply of hydrogen at its core. This star has 19 times the radius of the Sun, radiating 133 solar luminosities from its photosphere at an effective temperature of 4,514 K. The metallicity of the star is subsolar.

Zeta Pavonis has a companion, probably optical, of apparent magnitude 12.0 at about 55.6" separation.
