= Beta Pavonis =

Star in the constellation Pavo

β Pavonis
- Location of β Pavonis (circled)

Observation data Epoch J2000 Equinox J2000
- Constellation: Pavo
- Right ascension: 20^{h} 44^{m} 57.49399^{s}
- Declination: −66° 12′ 11.5708″
- Apparent magnitude (V): 3.42

Characteristics
- Spectral type: A5 IV or A7 III
- U−B color index: +0.12
- B−V color index: +0.16

Astrometry
Radial velocity (R_{v})	+3.7±0.5 km/s
Proper motion (μ)	RA: −42.67 mas/yr Dec.: +9.94 mas/yr
Parallax (π)	24.14±0.16 mas
Distance	135.1 ± 0.9 ly (41.4 ± 0.3 pc)
Absolute magnitude (M_{V})	+0.33

Details
Mass	2.51 M_{☉}
Radius	2.3 R_{☉}
Luminosity	66 L_{☉}
Surface gravity (log g)	3.84 cgs
Temperature	8,184±278 K
Rotational velocity (v sin i)	75 km/s
Age	305 Myr

Other designations
- β Pav, CPD−66°3501, FK5 775, GC 28862, HD 197051, HIP 102395, HR 7913, SAO 254862

Database references
SIMBAD	data

Beta Pavonis is a single, white-hued star in the southern constellation of Pavo. Its name is a Bayer designation that is Latinized from β Pavonis, and abbreviated Beta Pav or β Pav. It can be seen with the naked eye, having an apparent visual magnitude of 3.42. Based upon an annual parallax shift of 24.14 mas as seen from Earth, it is located 135 light-years from the Sun. It is moving away from the Sun with a radial velocity of +4 km/s. Beta Pavonis is a member of the Ursa Major Moving Group, a set of stars that share a similar motion through space.

Zorec and Royer (2012) list a stellar classification for this star of A5 IV, indicating it is an evolving subgiant star that has consumed the hydrogen at its core and has begun to expand onto the red giant branch. However, Houk (1979) listed a more evolved class of A7 III, suggesting it is already a giant star. It has about 2.3 times the Sun's radius and 2.51 times the mass of the Sun. At the estimated age of 305 million years, the star still has a relatively high rate of spin, having a projected rotational velocity of 75 km/s. Beta Pavonis is radiating 66 times the Sun's luminosity from its photosphere at an effective temperature of about 8,184 K.
