= Lambda Pavonis =

Star in the constellation Pavo

- Location of λ Pavonis (circled)

Observation data Epoch J2000 Equinox ICRS
- Constellation: Pavo
- Right ascension: 18^{h} 52^{m} 13.03427^{s}
- Declination: −62° 11′ 15.3324″
- Apparent magnitude (V): 4.22 (4.00 - 4.26)

Characteristics
- Spectral type: B2Ve or B2II–IIIe
- U−B color index: −0.88
- B−V color index: −0.15
- Variable type: γ Cas

Astrometry
Radial velocity (R_{v})	+9.0±4.1 km/s
Proper motion (μ)	RA: −1.86 mas/yr Dec.: −13.02 mas/yr
Parallax (π)	2.28±0.18 mas
Distance	1,400 ± 100 ly (440 ± 30 pc)
Absolute magnitude (M_{V})	−3.97

Details
Mass	12.5 M_{☉}
Radius	9±1 (polar) R_{☉}
Luminosity	8,450 L_{☉}
Temperature	20,300 K
Rotational velocity (v sin i)	190 km/s

Other designations
- λ Pav, CD−62°1254, FK5 704, GC 25823, HD 173948, HIP 92609, HR 7074, SAO 254393, CCDM J18522-6212A, WDS J18522-6211

Database references
SIMBAD	data

λ Pavonis, Latinized as Lambda Pavonis, is a single, variable star in the southern constellation of Pavo. It is a blue-white hued star that is faintly visible to the naked eye with an apparent visual magnitude that fluctuates around 4.22. This object is located approximately 1,400 light years from the Sun, based upon parallax. It is a member of the Scorpius–Centaurus association.

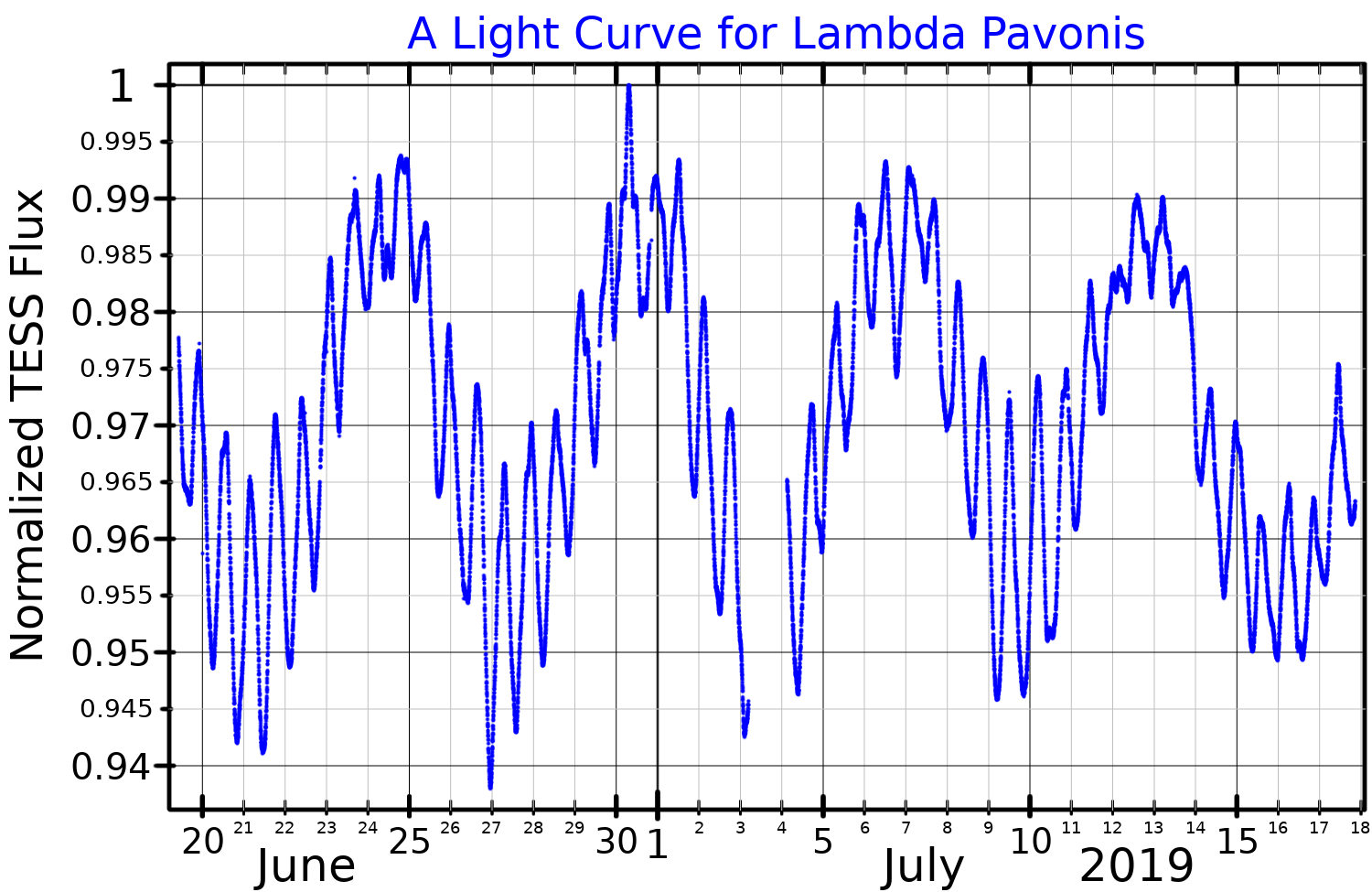
A light curve for Lambda Pavonis, plotted from TESS data

This is a massive Be star, a rapidly rotating hot blue star which has developed a gas disk around it. It is a γ Cassiopeiae variable or shell star which has occasionally brightened to magnitude 4.0. The stellar classification of B2Ve suggests it is a B-type main-sequence star that is generating energy through core hydrogen fusion. This star is spinning rapidly with a projected rotational velocity of 190 km/s. This is giving the star an oblate shape with an equatorial bulge that is an estimated 10% larger than the polar radius. Lambda Pavonis has 12.5 times the mass of the Sun and nine times the Sun's polar radius. It is radiating 8,450 times the luminosity of the Sun from its photosphere at an effective temperature of 20,300 K.

Variations in signals coming from Lambda Pavonis have led to a debate on whether it is a binary, single or pulsating variable star.
