= Gamma Pavonis =

Star in the constellation Pavo

- Location of γ Pavonis (circled)

Observation data Epoch J2000 Equinox ICRS
- Constellation: Pavo
- Right ascension: 21^{h} 26^{m} 26.60498^{s}
- Declination: −65° 21′ 58.3131″
- Apparent magnitude (V): 4.22

Characteristics
- Evolutionary stage: main sequence
- Spectral type: F9 V Fe-1.4 CH-0.7
- U−B color index: −0.13
- B−V color index: +0.48
- Variable type: Suspected

Astrometry
Radial velocity (R_{v})	−29.78±0.12 km/s
Proper motion (μ)	RA: +80.815 mas/yr Dec.: +800.573 mas/yr
Parallax (π)	108.0102±0.1061 mas
Distance	30.20 ± 0.03 ly (9.258 ± 0.009 pc)
Absolute magnitude (M_{V})	4.40

Details
Mass	0.934±0.033 M_{☉}
Radius	1.057±0.012 R_{☉}
Luminosity	1.461±0.049 L_{☉}
Surface gravity (log g)	4.359±0.008 cgs
Temperature	6,168±130 K
Metallicity [Fe/H]	−0.66±0.09 dex
Rotational velocity (v sin i)	1.0±0.6 km/s
Age	5.9±1.2 Gyr

Other designations
- γ Pav, CD−65°2751, FK5 805, GJ 827, HD 203608, HIP 105858, HR 8181, SAO 254999, LHS 3674, LTT 8510

Database references
SIMBAD	data

Gamma Pavonis, Latinized from γ Pavonis, is a star in the southern circumpolar constellation of Pavo. With an apparent visual magnitude of 4.22, it is a fourth-magnitude star and thereby visible to the naked eye. From parallax observations with the Gaia satellite, the distance to this star has been measured at 30.20 light-years (9.26 parsecs). It is drifting closer to the Sun with a radial velocity of −30 km/s.

The stellar classification of F9 V puts it in the class of F-type main sequence stars that generate energy through the nuclear fusion of hydrogen at the core. It is a metal-poor star, which means it has a low abundance of elements heavier than helium. This star has about 93% of the Sun's mass, and about 106% its radius. It is a brighter star with 146% of the Sun's luminosity, which is it radiating from the outer envelope at an effective temperature of 6,168 K. Its age is estimated at 5.9 billion years.

This star had rank 14 on TPF-C's top 100 target stars to search for a rocky planet in the Habitable Zone, approximately 1.2 AU, or a little beyond an Earth-like orbit.
