= Epsilon Pavonis =

Star in the constellation Pavo

ε Pavonis
- Location of ε Pavonis (circled)

Observation data Epoch J2000 Equinox J2000
- Constellation: Pavo
- Right ascension: 20^{h} 00^{m} 35.55558^{s}
- Declination: −72° 54′ 37.8198″
- Apparent magnitude (V): 3.97

Characteristics
- Spectral type: A0 Va
- U−B color index: −0.05
- B−V color index: −0.03

Astrometry
| Radial velocity (R_{v}) | −6.7±0.7 km/s |
| Proper motion (μ) | RA: +81.78 mas/yr Dec.: −132.16 mas/yr |
| Parallax (π) | 31.04±0.17 mas |
| Distance | 105.1 ± 0.6 ly (32.2 ± 0.2 pc) |
| Absolute magnitude (M_{V}) | 1.43 |

Details
| Mass | 2.2 M_{☉} |
| Radius | 1.74 R_{☉} |
| Luminosity | 32 L_{☉} |
| Surface gravity (log g) | 4.32±0.02 cgs |
| Temperature | 10,440 K |
| Rotational velocity (v sin i) | 85 km/s |
| Age | 27 Myr |

Other designations
- ε Pav, CPD−73°2086, FK5 748, GC 27631, HD 188228, HIP 98495, HR 7590, SAO 257757

Database references
| SIMBAD | data |

Epsilon Pavonis is a single, white-hued star in the constellation Pavo. Its name is a Bayer designation that is Latinized from ε Pavonis, and abbreviated Epsilon Pav or ε Pav. It can be viewed with the naked eye, having an apparent visual magnitude of 3.97. The annual parallax shift of 31.04 mas provides a distance estimate of 105 light years from the Sun.

With a stellar classification of A0 Va, Epsilon Pavonis is an ordinary A-type main-sequence star that is generating energy through hydrogen fusion at its core. It is just 27 million years old with a projected rotational velocity of 85 km/s. The star has 2.2 times the mass of the Sun and 1.74 times the Sun's radius. It is radiating 32 times the Sun's luminosity from its photosphere at an effective temperature of 10,440 K.

This star is a member of the proposed Argus Association, a young moving group of more than 60 stars associated with the IC 2391 cluster. Epsilon Pavonis is moving closer to the Sun with a radial velocity of −6.7 km/s.
