= Eta Pavonis =

Star in the Pavo constellation

η Pavonis
- Location of η Pavonis (circled)

Observation data Epoch J2000 Equinox ICRS
- Constellation: Pavo
- Right ascension: 17^{h} 45^{m} 43.98605^{s}
- Declination: −64° 43′ 25.9394″
- Apparent magnitude (V): 3.61

Characteristics
- Spectral type: K2II
- U−B color index: +1.17
- B−V color index: +1.19

Astrometry
Radial velocity (R_{v})	−7.60 km/s
Proper motion (μ)	RA: −11.96 mas/yr Dec.: −56.57 mas/yr
Parallax (π)	9.26±0.18 mas
Distance	352 ± 7 ly (108 ± 2 pc)
Absolute magnitude (M_{V})	−1.6

Details
Mass	4 M_{☉}
Radius	33.49+8.17 −4.57 R_{☉}
Luminosity	469±20 L_{☉}
Surface gravity (log g)	1.97 cgs
Temperature	4,642+354 −480 K
Metallicity [Fe/H]	+0.15 dex
Rotational velocity (v sin i)	< 1.5 km/s

Other designations
- η Pav, CPD−64°3662, FK5 661, GC 254020, HD 160635, HIP 86929, HR 6582, SAO 245369

Database references
SIMBAD	data

Eta Pavonis, a name latinized from η Pavonis, is a single star in the southern constellation of Pavo, positioned near the western constellation border next to Ara. It has an orange hue and is visible to the naked eye with an apparent visual magnitude of 3.61. Based on parallax, this object is located at a distance of approximately 350 light-years (108 pc) from the Solar System. It has an absolute magnitude of −1.6, and is drifting closer with a radial velocity of −7.6 km/s.

This is an evolved bright giant star with a stellar classification K2II, between the classifications of giant and supergiant. Having exhausted the supply of hydrogen at its core, it has expanded to around 33.5 times the radius of the Sun. The star is radiating 469 times the luminosity of the Sun from its enlarged photosphere at an effective temperature of 4,642 K.
