= Kappa Pavonis =

Variable star in the constellation Pavo

- Location of κ Pav (circled)

Observation data Epoch J2000 Equinox J2000
- Constellation: Pavo
- Right ascension: 18^{h} 56^{m} 57.02788^{s}
- Declination: −67° 14′ 00.5831″
- Apparent magnitude (V): 4.35 (3.91 - 4.78)

Characteristics
- Spectral type: F5-G5 I-II
- B−V color index: +0.63
- Variable type: W Vir

Astrometry
| Radial velocity (R_{v}) | 37.80 km/s |
| Proper motion (μ) | RA: −8.46 mas/yr Dec.: 16.47 mas/yr |
| Parallax (π) | 5.57±0.28 mas |
| Distance | 590 ± 30 ly (180 ± 9 pc) |
| Absolute magnitude (M_{V}) | −1.99 |

Details
| Mass | 0.56±0.08 M_{☉} |
| Radius | 22.8±1.1 R_{☉} |
| Luminosity | 565 L_{☉} |
| Temperature | 5,250 - 6,350 K |
| Metallicity [Fe/H] | −0.5 dex |

Other designations
- CD−67°2287, HD 174694, HIP 93015, HR 7107, SAO 254413, AAVSO 1846-67

Database references
| SIMBAD | data |

Kappa Pavonis (κ Pav) is a variable star in the constellation Pavo. It is the brightest W Virginis variable in the sky.

== Discovery ==
In 1901, κ Pavonis was reported to be a variable star with a magnitude range of 3.8 to 5.2 with a period of 9.0908 days. Further observations revealed radial velocity variations in time with the brightness variations, but this was assumed to indicate a spectroscopic binary system. The brightness variations were then interpreted as eclipses.

Less than 10 years later, was κ Pav was listed as a likely Cepheid variable. In 1937 it was used as part of the effort to calibrate the Cepheid distance scale. Only years later were the separate period luminosity relationships for population I and II Cepheid variables identified, and κ Pav was assigned to the type II group.

== Variability ==
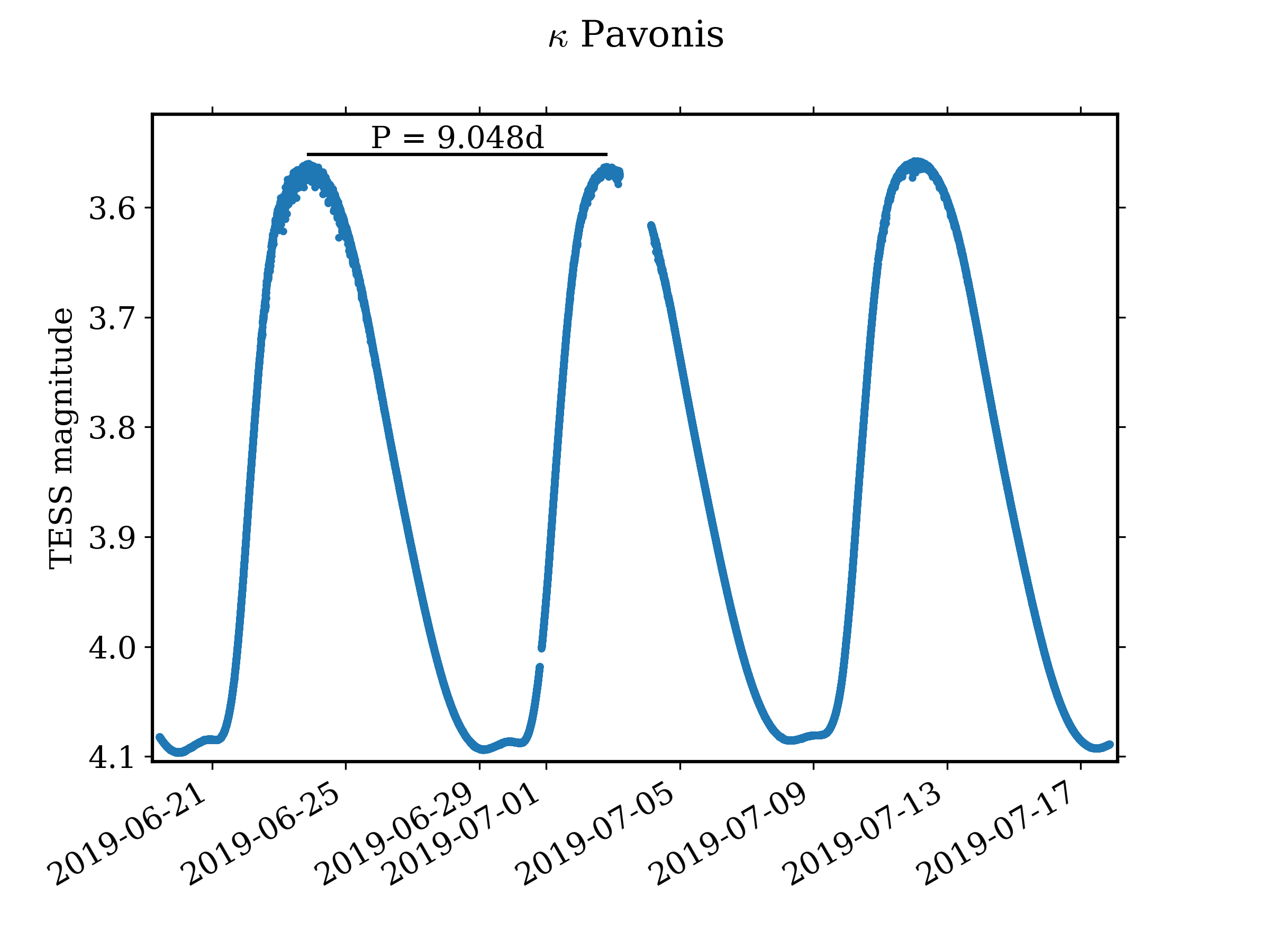
Lightcurve of κ Pavonis recorded by NASA's Transiting Exoplanet Survey Satellite (TESS).

κ Pavonis ranges between apparent magnitudes 3.91 and 4.78, and spectral types F5 to G5, over a period of 9.1 days. It is a W Virginis variable, a type II Cepheid thought to be evolving along a blue loop from the thermal pulsing asymptotic giant branch.

κ Pav shows sudden small changes in the period of its otherwise highly regular pulsations. The period has changed at times by as much as 16 minutes from its average of around 9 days and 2 hours. The star also is considered peculiar compared to other W Virginis stars such as W Virginis itself. A sub-group of W Virginis stars in the Large Magellanic Cloud have been discovered to be hotter and more luminous than expected and given a pW (peculiar W Virginis) classification. It is proposed that κ Pav should also be given a pW classification. The peculiarities in the LMC stars may be due to binary interactions, although κ Pav is not known to be a binary star.

== Properties ==
κ Pavonis is a large star several hundred times more luminous than the sun. Its spectral type varies as it pulsates, between F5 and G5 as the temperature changes, and the luminosity class changes from a bright giant to a supergiant. The luminosity class is relatively high for a star of this luminosity, due to the low surface gravity caused by a low mass pulsating star. The pulsations cause the star's radius to change by about 3 R_{☉} above and below the mean size. The angular diameter of the disc has been directly observed to change during the pulsations.
