= Delta Pavonis =

Star in the constellation Pavo

- Location of δ Pavonis (circled)

Observation data Epoch J2000 Equinox ICRS
- Constellation: Pavo
- Right ascension: 20^{h} 08^{m} 43.60887^{s}
- Declination: −66° 10′ 55.4428″
- Apparent magnitude (V): 3.56

Characteristics
- Evolutionary stage: subgiant
- Spectral type: G8 IV
- U−B color index: 0.45
- B−V color index: 0.76
- Variable type: Suspected

Astrometry
Radial velocity (R_{v})	−23.52±0.81 km/s
Proper motion (μ)	RA: +1,211.761 mas/yr Dec.: –1,130.237 mas/yr
Parallax (π)	163.9544±0.1222 mas
Distance	19.89 ± 0.01 ly (6.099 ± 0.005 pc)
Absolute magnitude (M_{V})	4.62

Details
Mass	1.07±0.01 M_{☉}
Radius	1.197±0.016 R_{☉}
Luminosity	1.24±0.03 L_{☉}
Surface gravity (log g)	4.29±0.02 cgs
Temperature	5,609±8 K
Metallicity [Fe/H]	0.371±0.008 dex
Rotation	21.4±9.3 days
Rotational velocity (v sin i)	0.32 km/s
Age	6.10+0.26 −0.25 Gyr

Other designations
- δ Pav, NSV 12790, CD−66 2367, GJ 780, HD 190248, HIP 99240, HR 7665, SAO 254733, LFT 1520, LHS 485, LTT 7946, 2MASS J20084376-6610563

Database references
SIMBAD	data

Delta Pavonis is a single star in the southern constellation of Pavo. Its name is a Bayer designation that is Latinized from δ Pavonis, and abbreviated Delta Pav or δ Pav. It has an apparent visual magnitude of 3.56, making it a fourth-magnitude star that is visible to the naked eye from the southern hemisphere. Parallax measurements yield an estimated distance of 19.89 light-years (6.10 parsecs) from Earth. This makes it one of the nearest bright stars to the Solar System. It is approaching the Sun with a radial velocity of −23.5 km/s, and is predicted to come as close as 17.8 light-years in around 49,200 years.

== Physical characteristics ==
This object is a subgiant of spectral type G8 IV; it will stop fusing hydrogen at its core relatively soon, starting the process of becoming a red giant. Hence, Delta Pavonis is 24% brighter than the Sun, but the effective temperature of its outer atmosphere is less: 5,571 K. Its mass is 107% of Sun's mass, with a radius 120% of Sun's radius. Delta Pavonis's surface convection zone extends downward to about 43.1% of the star's radius, but only contains 4.8% of the star's mass.

Spectroscopic examination of Delta Pavonis shows that it has a higher abundance of elements heavier than helium (metallicity) than does the Sun. This value is typically given in terms of the ratio of iron (chemical symbol Fe) to hydrogen (H) in a star's atmosphere, relative to that in Sun's atmosphere (iron being a good proxy for the presence of other heavy elements). The metallicity of Delta Pavonis is approximately

$$\begin{smallmatrix}\left [ \frac{Fe}{H} \right ]\ =\ 0.371\end{smallmatrix}$$

This notation gives the logarithm of the iron-to-hydrogen ratio, relative to that of the Sun, meaning that Delta Pavonis's iron abundance is 235% of that of Sun. It is considered super metal-rich, and the high metallicity has slowed its evolution. Studies show a correlation between abundant heavy elements in stars and the presence of a planetary system, so Delta Pavonis has a greater than average probability of harboring planets.

The age of Delta Pavonis is approximately 6.1 billion years. It has a projected rotational velocity of 0.32 kilometers per second, and is spinning with a period of roughly 21 days, slightly faster than the Sun.

== Possible planetary system ==
The existence of a Jupiter-mass gas giant on a long-period orbit around Delta Pavonis is suspected, as of 2021, based on astrometric data. A study in 2023 detected a trend in the star's radial velocity, which may indicate the presence of a planetary companion, supporting the previous astrometric result. Such a planet would, at minimum, orbit with a period of 37 years at a distance of 11.1 AU, and have a mass at least 69 M_{🜨} (0.22 M_{J}).

The Delta Pavonis planetary system
Companion (in order from star)	Mass	Semimajor axis (AU)	Orbital period (days)	Eccentricity	Inclination (°)	Radius
(unconfirmed)	≥69 M_{🜨}	≥11.1	≥13,500	—	—	—

== SETI ==
Delta Pavonis has been identified by Maggie Turnbull and Jill Tarter of the SETI Institute as the "Best SETI target" among the 100 closest G-type stars. Properties in its favor include a high metallicity, minimal level of magnetic activity, low rotation rate, and kinematic membership in the thin disk population of the Milky Way. Gas giants orbiting in, near, or through a star's habitable zone may destabilize the orbits of terrestrial planets in that zone; the lack of detected radial velocity variation suggests that there are no such gas giants orbiting Delta Pavonis. However, observation has detected no artificial radio sources. Delta Pavonis, a close photometric match to the Sun, is the nearest solar analog that is not a member of a binary or multiple star system.

== McLeish's object ==
As seen from Earth, Delta Pavonis is located slightly northwest of McLeish's object, an elongated galaxy which received catalog number PGC 64180 (LEDA 64180).

== See also ==
- List of nearest G-type stars
