= Pavo (constellation) =

Constellation in the southern celestial hemisphere

- Constellation
- List of stars in Pavo
- Abbreviation: Pav
- Genitive: Pavonis
- Pronunciation: /ˈpeɪvoʊ/, /ˈpɑːvoʊ/, genitive /pəˈvoʊnɪs/
- Symbolism: the Peacock
- Right ascension: 18^{h} 10.4^{m} to 21^{h} 32.4^{m}
- Declination: −56° 35.4′ to −74° 58.8′
- Quadrant: SQ4
- Area: 378 sq. deg. (44th)
- Main stars: 7
- Bayer/Flamsteed stars: 24
- Stars brighter than 3.00^{m}: 1
- Stars within 10.00 pc (32.62 ly): 4
- Brightest star: α Pav (Peacock) (1.91^{m})
- Nearest star: SCR 1845−6357
- Messier objects: 0
- Meteor showers: Delta Pavonids
- Bordering constellations: Octans; Apus; Ara; Telescopium; Indus
- Visible at latitudes between +30° and −90°. Best visible at 21:00 (9 p.m.) during the month of August.

Pavo is a constellation in the southern sky whose name is Latin for 'peacock'. Pavo first appeared on a 35-cm (14 in) diameter celestial globe published in 1598 in Amsterdam by Petrus Plancius and Jodocus Hondius and was depicted in Johann Bayer's star atlas Uranometria of 1603, and was likely conceived by Plancius from the observations of Pieter Dirkszoon Keyser and Frederick de Houtman. French explorer and astronomer Nicolas-Louis de Lacaille gave its stars Bayer designations in 1756. The constellations Pavo, Grus, Phoenix and Tucana are collectively known as the "Southern Birds".

The constellation's brightest member, Alpha Pavonis, is also known as Peacock and appears as a 1.91-magnitude blue-white star, but is actually a spectroscopic binary. Delta Pavonis is a nearby Sun-like star some 19.9 light-years distant. Six of the star systems in Pavo have been found to host planets, including HD 181433 with a super-Earth, and HD 172555 with evidence of a major interplanetary collision in the past few thousand years. The constellation contains NGC 6752, the fourth-brightest globular cluster in the sky, and the spiral galaxy NGC 6744, which closely resembles the Milky Way but is twice as large. Pavo displays an annual meteor shower known as the Delta Pavonids, whose radiant is near the star δ Pav.

== History and mythology ==
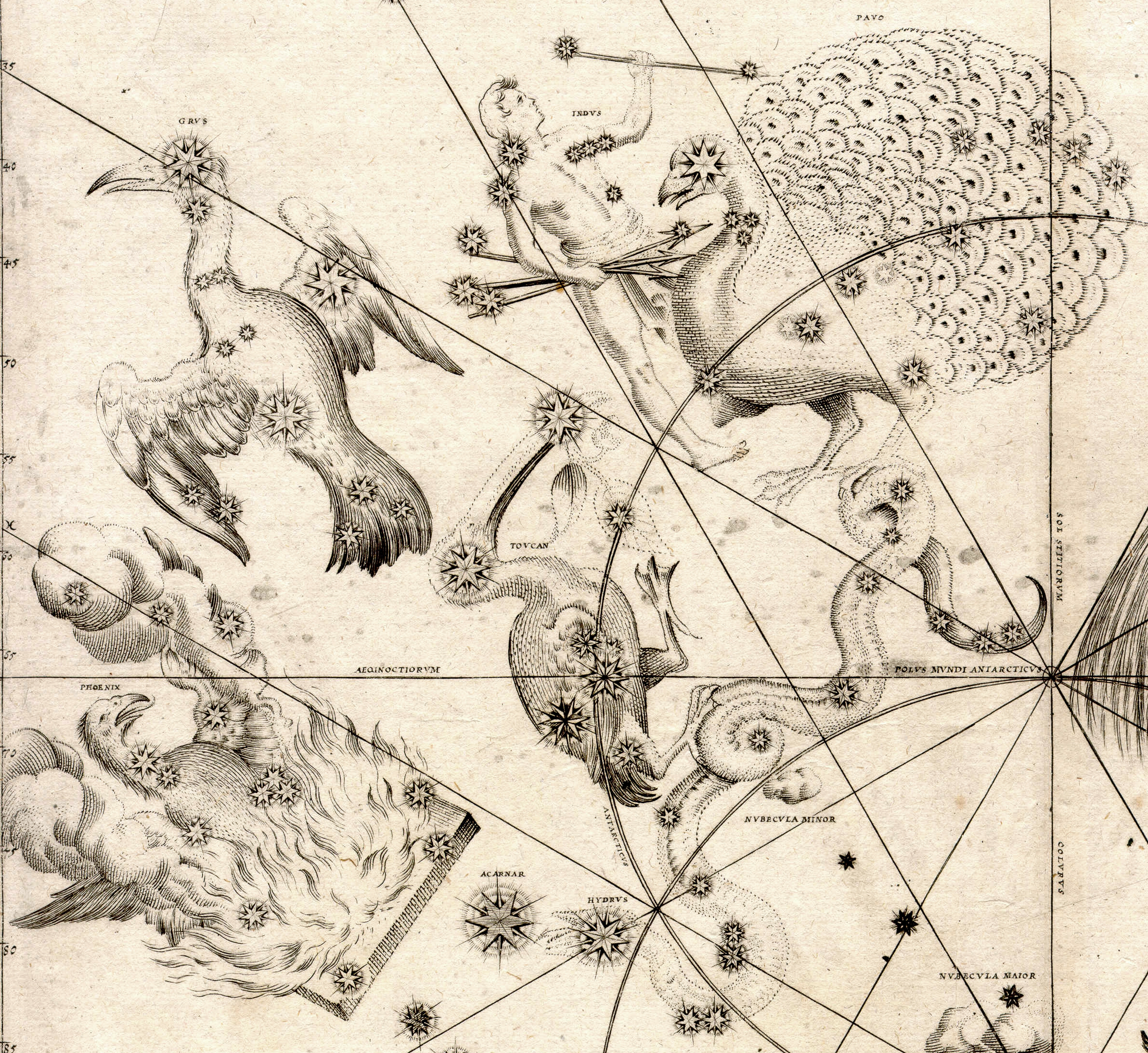
Pavo (upper right), with the other southern birds, in its first appearance in a celestial atlas, Johann Bayer's Uranometria

Pavo was one of the twelve constellations established by Petrus Plancius from the observations of the southern sky by explorers Pieter Dirkszoon Keyser and Frederick de Houtman, who had sailed on the first Dutch trading expedition, known as the Eerste Schipvaart, to the East Indies. It first appeared on a 35 cm (14 in) diameter celestial globe published in 1598 in Amsterdam by Plancius with Jodocus Hondius. The first depiction of this constellation in a celestial atlas was in German cartographer Johann Bayer's Uranometria of 1603. De Houtman included it in his southern star catalogue the same year under the Dutch name De Pauww 'The Peacock'. Pavo and the nearby constellations Phoenix, Grus, and Tucana are collectively called the "Southern Birds".

=== Greek mythology ===
According to Mark Chartrand, former executive director of the National Space Institute, Plancius may not have been the first to designate this group of stars as a peacock: "In Greek myth the stars that are now the Peacock were Argos [or Argus], builder of the ship Argo. He was changed by the goddess Juno into a peacock and placed in the sky along with his ship." Indeed, the peacock "symboliz[ed] the starry firmament" for the Greeks, and the goddess Hera was believed to drive through the heavens in a chariot drawn by peacocks.

The peacock and the "Argus" nomenclature are also prominent in a different myth, in which Io, a beautiful princess of Argos, was lusted after by Zeus (Jupiter). Zeus changed Io into a heifer to deceive his wife (and sister) Hera and couple with her. Hera saw through Zeus's scheme and asked for the heifer as a gift. Zeus, unable to refuse such a reasonable request, reluctantly gave the heifer to Hera, who promptly banished Io and arranged for Argus Panoptes, a creature with one hundred eyes, to guard the now-pregnant Io from Zeus. Meanwhile, Zeus entreated Hermes to save Io; Hermes used music to lull Argus Panoptes to sleep, then slew him. Hera adorned the tail of a peacock—her favorite bird—with Argus's eyes in his honor.

As recounted in Ovid's Metamorphoses, the death of Argus Panoptes also contains an explicit celestial reference: "Argus lay dead; so many eyes, so bright quenched, and all hundred shrouded in one night. Saturnia [Hera] retrieved those eyes to set in place among the feathers of her bird [the peacock, Pavo] and filled his tail with starry jewels."

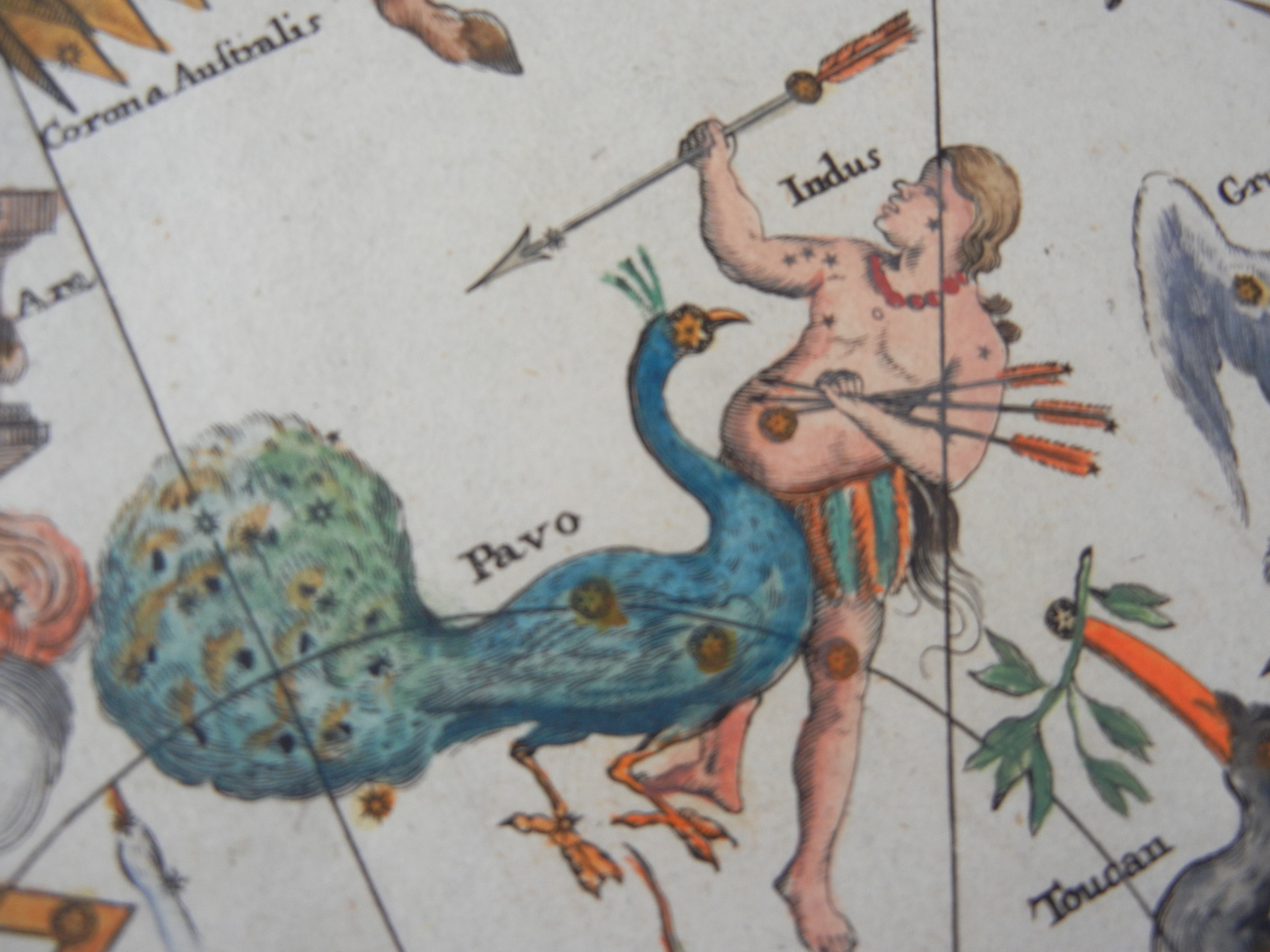
The constellations Pavo and Indus, featured (reversed) in the chart of the Southern Celestial Hemisphere by Johann Gabriel Doppelmayr in his Atlas Cœlestis, c. 1742

It is uncertain whether the Dutch astronomers had the Greek mythos in mind when creating Pavo but, in keeping with other constellations introduced by Plancius through Keyser and De Houtmann, the "peacock" in the new constellation likely referred to the green peacock, which the explorers would have encountered in the East Indies, rather than the blue peacock known to the ancient Greeks. Another possible inspiration for the name Pavo may be from the major financial supporter of the Dutch missions, who was Reynier Pauw (Pauw means Pavo/peacock in Dutch). Despite the fact Reynier Pauw does not have any streetname nor school named after him, this fact would honor his contribution to the Dutch history in a brilliant way.

== Equivalents ==
Part of the constellation is referred to as "the Saucepan", particularly in Australia. The rather faint stars form a rough quadrangle southward of the main Peacock stars, with another pair of stars extending eastward to form a handle. It is used as a navigational tool to find southern celestial pole.

The Wardaman people of the Northern Territory of Australia saw the stars of Pavo and the neighbouring constellation Ara as flying foxes. The Adnyamathanha people of the Flinders Ranges in South Australia call the Saucepan Mirarrityi, and it is used to represent their men's stories in their flag.

== Characteristics ==
Pavo is bordered by Telescopium to the north, Apus and Ara to the west, Octans to the south, and Indus to the east and northeast. Covering 378 square degrees, it ranks 44th of the 88 modern constellations in size and covers 0.916% of the night sky. The three-letter abbreviation for the constellation, as adopted by the International Astronomical Union in 1922, is "Pav". The official constellation boundaries, as set by Belgian astronomer Eugène Delporte in 1930, are defined by a polygon of 10 segments. In the equatorial coordinate system, the right ascension coordinates of these borders lie between 18^{h} 10.4^{m} and 21^{h} 32.4^{m} , while the declination coordinates are between −56.59° and −74.98°. As one of the deep southern constellations, it remains below the horizon at latitudes north of the 30th parallel in the Northern Hemisphere, and is circumpolar at latitudes south of the 50th parallel in the Southern Hemisphere.

== Features ==
=== Stars ===
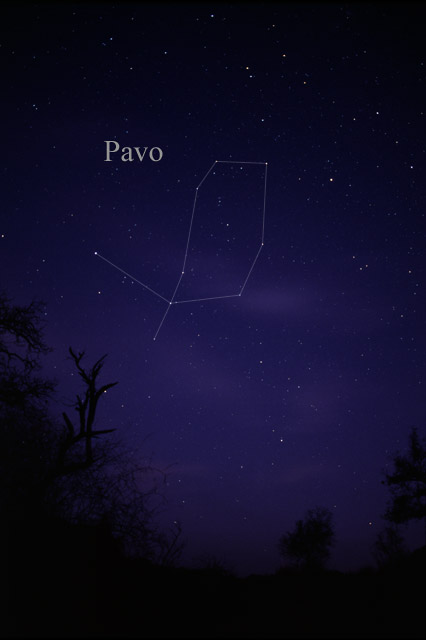
The constellation Pavo as it can be seen by the naked eye

Although he depicted Pavo on his chart, Bayer did not assign its stars Bayer designations. French explorer and astronomer Nicolas-Louis de Lacaille labelled them Alpha to Omega in 1756, but omitted Psi and Xi, and labelled two pairs of stars close together Mu and Phi Pavonis. In 1879, American astronomer Benjamin Gould designated a star Xi Pavonis as he felt its brightness warranted a name, but dropped Chi Pavonis due to its faintness.

Lying near the constellation's northern border with Telescopium is Alpha Pavonis, the brightest star in Pavo. Its proper name—Peacock—is an English translation of the constellation's name. It was assigned by the British HM Nautical Almanac Office in the late 1930s; the Royal Air Force insisted that all bright stars must have names, the star hitherto having lacked a proper name. Alpha has an apparent (or visual) magnitude of 1.91 and spectral type B2IV. It is a spectroscopic binary system, one estimate placing the distance between the pair of stars as 0.21 astronomical units (AU), or half the distance between Mercury and the Sun. The two stars rotate around each other in a mere 11 days and 18 hours. The star system is located around 180 light years away from Earth.

With an apparent magnitude of 3.43, Beta Pavonis is the second-brightest star in the constellation. A white giant of spectral class A7III, it is an aging star that has used up the hydrogen fuel at its core and has expanded and cooled after moving off the main sequence. It lies 135 light years away from the Solar System.

Lying a few degrees west of Beta is Delta Pavonis, a nearby Sun-like but more evolved star; this is a yellow subgiant of spectral type G8IV and apparent magnitude 3.56 that is only 19.9 light years distant from Earth. East of Beta and at the constellation's eastern border with Indus is Gamma Pavonis, a fainter, solar-type star 30 light years from Earth with a magnitude of 4.22 and stellar class F9V. Other nearby stars in Pavo are much fainter: SCR 1845-6357 (the nearest star in Pavo) is a binary system with an apparent magnitude of 17.4 consisting of a red dwarf and brown dwarf companion lying around 12.6 light years distant, while Gliese 693 is a red dwarf of magnitude 10.78 lying 19 light years away.

Pavo contains several variable stars of note. Lambda Pavonis is a bright irregular variable ranging between magnitudes 3.4 and 4.4; this variation can be observed with the unaided eye. Classed as a Gamma Cassiopeiae variable or shell star, it is of spectral type B2II-IIIe and lies around 1430 light years distant from Earth. Kappa Pavonis is a W Virginis variable—a subclass of Type II Cepheid. It ranges from magnitude 3.91 to 4.78 over 9 days and is a yellow-white supergiant pulsating between spectral classes F5I-II and G5I-II. NU and V Pavonis are pulsating semiregular variable red giant stars. NU has a spectral type M6III and ranges from magnitude 4.9 to 5.3, while V Pavonis ranges from magnitude 6.3 to 8.2 over two periods of 225.4 and 3735 days concurrently. V is a carbon star (Note: C6 is equivalent to a class M2–M3 star, the 4 shows the strength of the Swan bands on a scale of 1 (weak) to 5 (strong), and the Nb indicates bands of the chemical element niobium. See: Gray, Richard O.; Corbally, Christopher J. (2009). Stellar Spectral Classification. Princeton, New Jersey: Princeton University Press. p. 309. ISBN 978-0-691-12511-4.) of spectral type C6,4(Nb) with a prominent red hue.

Located in the west of the constellation and depicting the peacock's tail are Eta and Xi Pavonis. At apparent magnitude 3.6, Eta is a luminous orange giant of spectral type K2II some 350 light years distant from Earth. Xi Pavonis is a multiple star system visible in small telescopes as a brighter orange star and fainter white companion. Located around 470 light years from Earth, the system has a magnitude of 4.38. AR Pavonis is a faint but well-studied eclipsing binary composed of a red giant and smaller hotter star some 18000 light years from Earth. It has some features of a cataclysmic variable, the smaller component most likely having an accretion disc. The visual magnitude ranges from 7.4 to 13.6 over 605 days.

In November 2018, the 8th magnitude star, HD 186302 became the second star identified to be a solar sibling, this one being particularly sun like, same spectra G2, virtually the same mass as well, with a twin spectra revealing identical metallicity.

=== Planetary systems and debris disks ===
Six stars with planetary systems have been found. Three planets have been discovered in the system of the orange star HD 181433, an inner super-Earth with an orbital period of 9.4 days and two outer gas giants with periods of 2.6 and 6 years respectively. HD 196050 and HD 175167 are yellow G-class Sun-like stars, while HD 190984 is an F-class main sequence star slightly larger and hotter than the Sun; all three are accompanied by a gas giant companion. HD 172555 is a young white A-type main sequence star, two planets of which appear to have had a major collision in the past few thousand years. Spectrographic evidence of large amounts of silicon dioxide gas indicates the smaller of the two, which had been at least the size of Earth's moon, was destroyed, and the larger, which was at least the size of Mercury, was severely damaged. Evidence of the collision was detected by NASA's Spitzer Space Telescope. In the south of the constellation, Epsilon Pavonis is a 3.95-magnitude white main sequence star of spectral type A0Va located around 105 light years distant from Earth. It appears to be surrounded by a narrow ring of dust at a distance of 107 AU.

=== Deep-sky objects ===
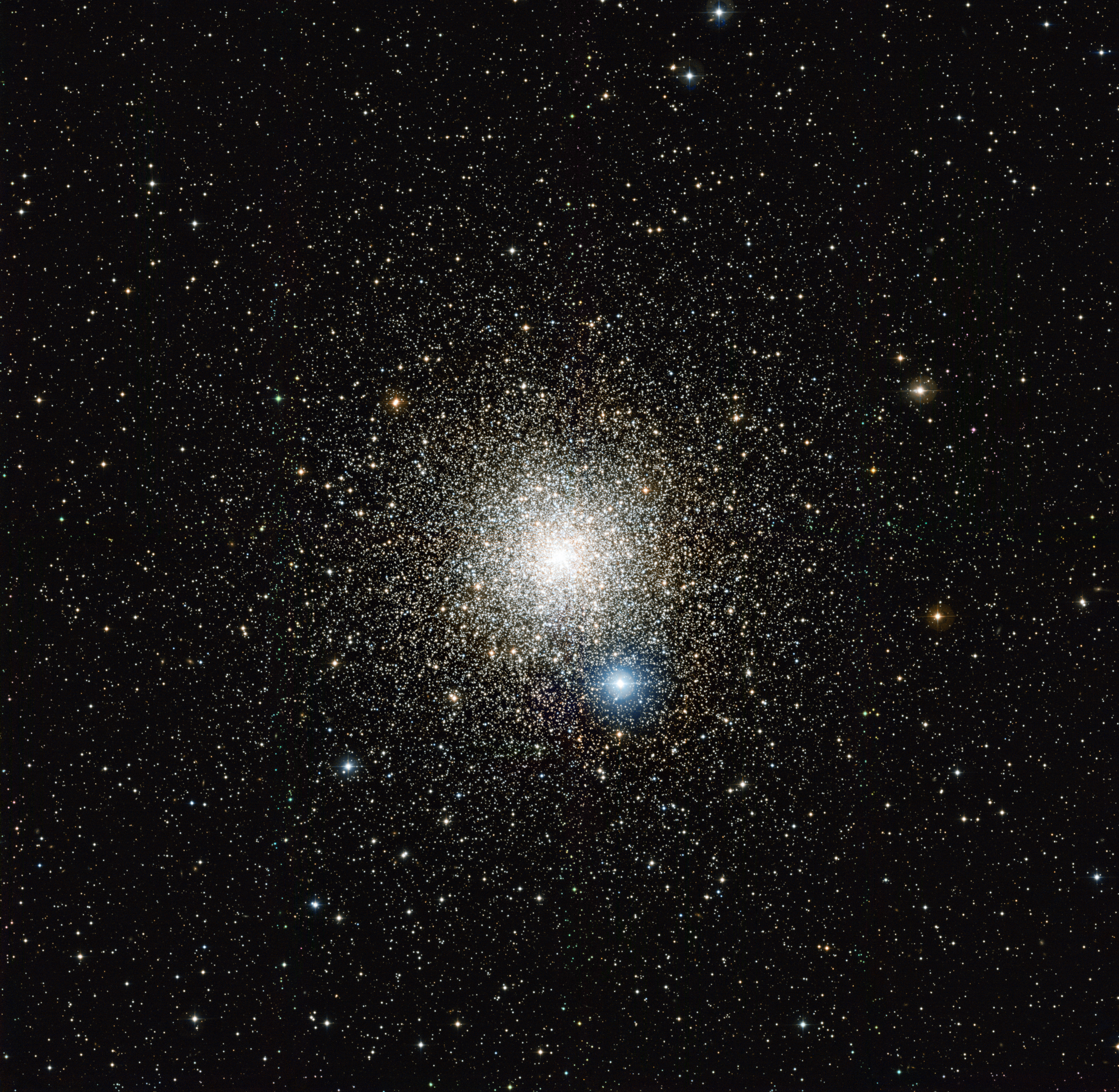
The globular cluster NGC 6752 contains an estimated 100,000 stars.

The deep-sky objects in Pavo include NGC 6752, the fourth-brightest globular cluster in the sky, after Omega Centauri, 47 Tucanae and Messier 22. An estimated 100 light years across, it is thought to contain 100,000 stars. Barely visible behind the cluster is a dwarf spheroidal galaxy known as Bedin I. Lying three degrees to the south is NGC 6744, a spiral galaxy around 30 million light years away from Earth that resembles the Milky Way, but is twice its diameter. A type 1c supernova was discovered in the galaxy in 2005; known as SN2005at, it peaked at magnitude 16.8. The dwarf galaxy IC 4662 lies 10 arcminutes northeast of Eta Pavonis, and is of magnitude 11.62. Located only 8 million light years away, it has several regions of high star formation. The 14th-magnitude galaxy IC 4965 lies 1.7 degrees west of Alpha Pavonis, and is a central member of the Shapley Supercluster. The galactic wind bearing NGC 6810 and the interacting NGC 6872/IC 4970 galaxies lie 87 and 212 million light-years away from Earth respectively.

=== Meteor showers ===
Pavo is the radiant of two annual meteor showers: the Delta Pavonids and August Pavonids. Appearing from 21 March to 8 April and generally peaking around 5 and 6 April, Delta Pavonids are thought to be associated with comet Grigg-Mellish. The shower was discovered by Michael Buhagiar from Perth, Australia, who observed meteors on six occasions between 1969 and 1980. The August Pavonids peak around 31 August and are thought to be associated with the Halley-type Comet Levy (P/1991 L3).

== See also ==
- Pavo in Chinese astronomy

== Sources ==
- Levy, David H. (2008). David Levy's Guide to Observing Meteor Showers. Cambridge, UK: Cambridge University Press. ISBN 978-0-521-69691-3.
