= List of nearest bright stars =

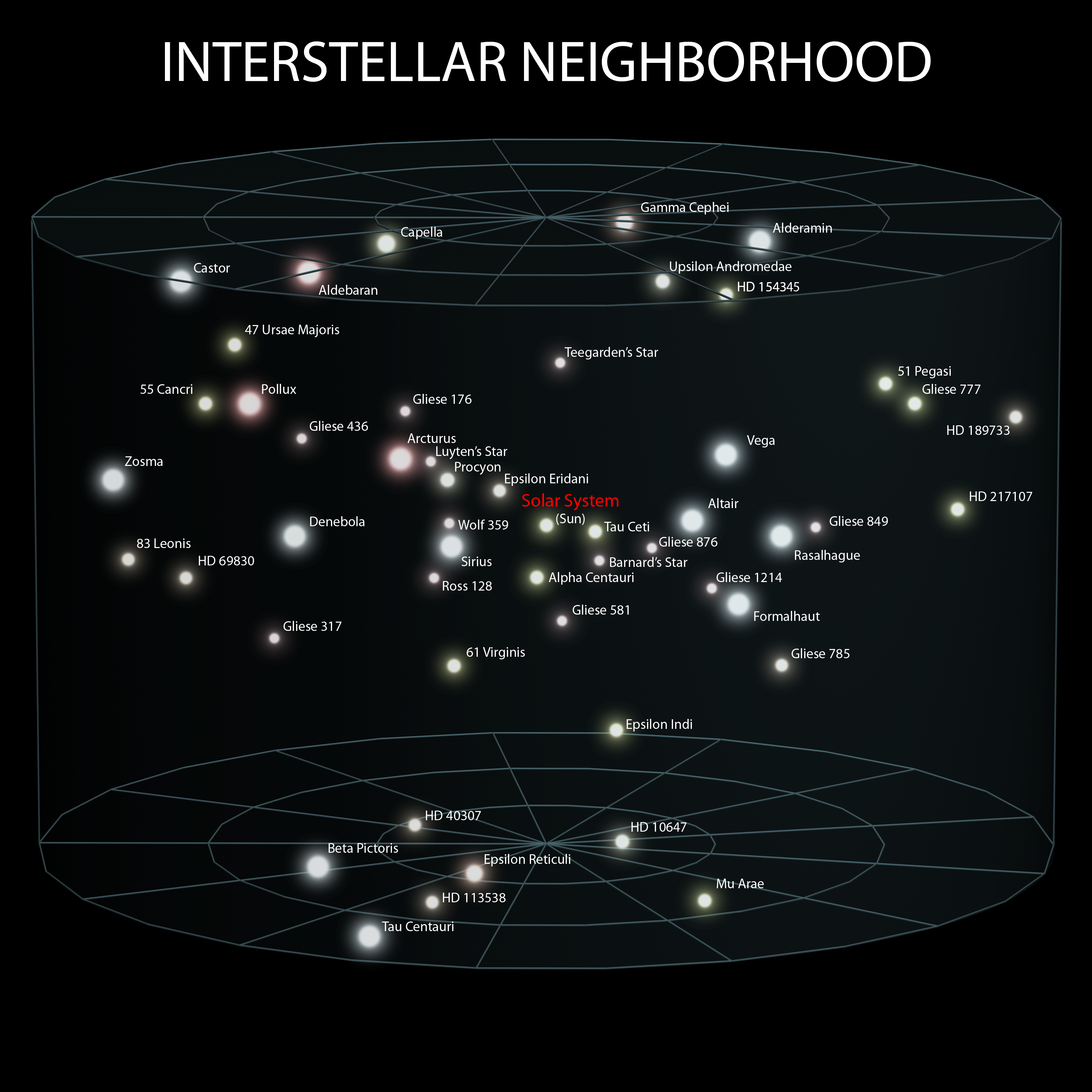
Prominent stars in the neighborhood of the Sun (center)

The following nearest bright stars are found within 15.0 parsecs (48.9 ly) of the closest star, the Sun, and have an absolute magnitude of +8.5 or brighter, which is approximately comparable to a listing of stars more luminous than a red dwarf. Right ascension and declination coordinates are for the epoch J2000. The distance measurements are based on the Hipparcos Catalogue and other astrometric data. In the event of a spectroscopic binary, the combined spectral type and absolute magnitude are listed in italics.

The list is ordered by increasing distance.

Legend
A-type star
F-type star
G-type star
K-type star
M-type star

== Stars within 10 parsecs ==
These stars are estimated to be within 32.6 light-years of the Sun.

Star Designation		Stellar Class	Magnitude		Right Ascension (J2000)	Declination (J2000)	Distance (Light-years)
Star Designation		Stellar Class	Apparent	Absolute	Right Ascension (J2000)	Declination (J2000)	Distance (Light-years)
Sun		G2V	−26.74	4.80	—	—	0
α Centauri	A (Rigil Kentaurus)	G2V	−0.01	4.34	14^{h} 39^{m} 36.50^{s}	−60° 50′ 02.3″	4.34
α Centauri	B (Toliman)	K1V	1.35	5.71	14^{h} 39^{m} 35.08^{s}	−60° 50′ 13.8″	4.34
Sirius (α Canis Majoris)		A1V	−1.44	1.45	06^{h} 45^{m} 08.92^{s}	−16° 42′ 58.0″	8.60
ε Eridani (Ran)		K2V	3.72	6.18	03^{h} 32^{m} 55.84^{s}	−09° 27′ 29.7″	10.5
61 Cygni	A	K5.0V	5.20	7.49	21^{h} 06^{m} 53.94^{s}	+38° 44′ 57.9″	11.4
61 Cygni	B	K7.0V	6.05	8.33	21^{h} 06^{m} 53.94^{s}	+38° 44′ 57.9″	11.4
Procyon (α Canis Minoris)	A	F5IV-V	0.40	2.68	07^{h} 39^{m} 18.12^{s}	+05° 13′ 30.0″	11.5
ε Indi		K5Ve	4.69	6.90	22^{h} 03^{m} 21.66^{s}	−56° 47′ 09.5″	11.9
τ Ceti		G8Vp	3.49	5.68	01^{h} 44^{m} 04.08^{s}	−15° 56′ 14.9″	11.9
Groombridge 1618 (in Ursa Major)		K7.0V	6.60	8.16	10^{h} 11^{m} 22.14^{s}	+49° 27′ 15.3″	15.9
ο^{2} Eridani	A (Keid)	K1Ve	4.43	5.92	04^{h} 15^{m} 16.32^{s}	−07° 39′ 10.3″	16.3
70 Ophiuchi	A	K1Ve	4.24	5.71	18^{h} 05^{m} 27.29^{s}	+02° 30′ 00.4″	16.7
70 Ophiuchi	B	K5Ve	6.01	7.48	18^{h} 05^{m} 27.29^{s}	+02° 30′ 00.4″	16.7
Altair (α Aquilae)		A7Vn	0.76	2.21	19^{h} 50^{m} 47.00^{s}	+08° 52′ 06.0″	16.7
σ Draconis		G9V	4.67	5.87	19^{h} 32^{m} 21.59^{s}	+69° 39′ 40.2″	18.8
Gliese 570 (in Libra)	A	K5Ve	5.72	6.86	14^{h} 57^{m} 28.00^{s}	−21° 24′ 55.7″	19.2
η Cassiopeiae	A (Achird)	G3V	3.46	4.59	00^{h} 49^{m} 06.29^{s}	+57° 48′ 54.7″	19.3
36 Ophiuchi	A (Guniibuu)	K1Ve	5.07	6.18	17^{h} 15^{m} 20.98^{s}	−26° 36′ 10.2″	19.4
36 Ophiuchi	B	K1Ve	5.11	6.22	17^{h} 15^{m} 20.98^{s}	−26° 36′ 10.2″	19.4
36 Ophiuchi	C	K5Ve	6.33	7.45	17^{h} 16^{m} 13.36^{s}	−26° 32′ 46.1″	19.4
HR 7703 (in Sagittarius)	A	K3V	5.32	6.42	20^{h} 11^{m} 11.94^{s}	−36° 06′ 04.4″	19.6
82 G. Eridani		G8V	4.26	5.35	03^{h} 19^{m} 55.65^{s}	−43° 04′ 11.2″	19.7
δ Pavonis		G7IV	3.55	4.62	20^{h} 08^{m} 42.61^{s}	−66° 10′ 55.4″	19.9
HD 219134 / Gliese 892 (in Cassiopeia)		K3V	5.57	6.49	23^{h} 13^{m} 16.98^{s}	+57° 10′ 06.1″	21.3
ξ Boötis	A	G8Ve	4.72	5.59	14^{h} 51^{m} 23.38^{s}	+19° 06′ 01.7″	22.0
ξ Boötis	B	K4Ve	6.97	7.84	14^{h} 51^{m} 23.38^{s}	+19° 06′ 01.7″	22.0
Gliese 667 (in Scorpius)	A	K3V	6.29	7.07	17^{h} 18^{m} 57.18^{s}	−34° 59′ 23.3″	23.2
Gliese 667 (in Scorpius)	B	K5V	7.24	8.02	17^{h} 18^{m} 57.18^{s}	−34° 59′ 23.3″	23.2
Gliese 105 (in Cetus)	A	K3V	5.79	6.50	02^{h} 36^{m} 04.89^{s}	+06° 53′ 12.7″	23.4
HD 4628 (in Pisces)		K2V	5.74	6.38	00^{h} 48^{m} 22.98^{s}	+05° 16′ 50.2″	24.3
β Hydri		G2IV	2.82	3.46	00^{h} 25^{m} 45.07^{s}	−77° 15′ 15.2″	24.3
107 Piscium		K1V	5.24	5.86	01^{h} 42^{m} 29.76^{s}	+20° 16′ 06.6″	24.4
μ Cassiopeiae	A	G5VI	5.17	5.78	01^{h} 08^{m} 16.39^{s}	+54° 55′ 13.2″	24.6
TW Piscis Austrini	B	K5Ve	6.48	7.07	22^{h} 56^{m} 24.05^{s}	−31° 33′ 56.0″	24.8
Vega (α Lyrae)		A0Va	0.03	0.58	18^{h} 36^{m} 56.34^{s}	+38° 47′ 01.3″	25.0
Fomalhaut (α Piscis Austrini/α PsA)	A	A3V	1.17	1.74	22^{h} 57^{m} 39.05^{s}	−29° 37′ 20.1″	25.1
Gliese 673 (in Ophiuchus)		K7V	7.54	8.10	17^{h} 25^{m} 45.23^{s}	+02° 06′ 41.1″	25.1
p Eridani	A	K0V	5.82	6.27	01^{h} 39^{m} 47.54^{s}	−56° 11′ 47.0″	25.5
p Eridani	B	K5V	5.95	6.40	01^{h} 39^{m} 47.54^{s}	−56° 11′ 47.0″	25.5
π^{3} Orionis (Tabit)		F6V	3.19	3.67	04^{h} 49^{m} 50.41^{s}	+06° 57′ 40.6″	26.3
χ Draconis	A	F7V	3.68	4.15	18^{h} 21^{m} 03.38^{s}	+72° 43′ 58.2″	26.3
χ Draconis	B	K0V	5.67	6.14	18^{h} 21^{m} 03.38^{s}	+72° 43′ 58.2″	26.3
Gliese 884 (in Aquarius)		K5	7.88	8.33	23^{h} 00^{m} 16.12^{s}	−22° 31′ 27.6″	26.6
μ Herculis		G5IV	3.42	3.80	17^{h} 46^{m} 27.53^{s}	+27° 43′ 14.4″	27.1
β Canum Venaticorum (Chara)		G0V	4.24	4.63	12^{h} 33^{m} 44.54^{s}	+41° 21′ 26.9″	27.5
61 Virginis		G5V	4.74	5.09	13^{h} 18^{m} 24.31^{s}	−18° 18′ 40.3″	27.9
ζ Tucanae		F9V	4.23	4.56	00^{h} 20^{m} 04.26^{s}	−64° 52′ 29.2″	28.0
χ^{1} Orionis	A	G0V	4.39	4.70	05^{h} 54^{m} 22.98^{s}	+20° 16′ 34.2″	28.3
HD 50281 (in Monoceros)	A	K3V	6.58	6.88	06^{h} 52^{m} 18.05^{s}	−05° 10′ 25.4″	28.4
HR 1614 (284 G. Eridani)	A	K3V	6.22	6.49	05^{h} 00^{m} 49.00^{s}	−05° 45′ 13.2″	28.4
41 G. Arae	A	G8V	5.55	5.83	17^{h} 19^{m} 03.83^{s}	−46° 38′ 10.4″	28.7
ξ Ursae Majoris	A (Alula Australis)	G0V	4.41	4.25	11^{h} 18^{m} 11^{s}	+31° 31′ 45″	28.8
ξ Ursae Majoris	B	G5V	4.87	5.07	11^{h} 18^{m} 11^{s}	+31° 31′ 45″	28.8
HD 192310/Gliese 785 (5 G. Capricorni)		K2+V	5.73	6.00	20^{h} 15^{m} 7.39^{s}	−27° 01′ 58.7″	29.1
γ Leporis	A	F7V	3.59	3.83	05^{h} 44^{m} 27.79^{s}	−22° 26′ 54.2″	29.3
γ Leporis	B	K2V	6.17	6.41	05^{h} 44^{m} 27.79^{s}	−22° 26′ 54.2″	29.3
δ Eridani (Rana)		K0IV	3.52	3.74	03^{h} 43^{m} 14.90^{s}	−09° 45′ 48.2″	29.5
Groombridge 1830 (in Ursa Major)		G8Vp	6.42	6.61	11^{h} 52^{m} 58.77^{s}	+37° 43′ 07.2″	29.7
β Comae Berenices		G0V	4.23	4.42	13^{h} 11^{m} 52.39^{s}	+27° 52′ 41.5″	29.8
κ^{1} Ceti		G5V	4.84	5.03	03^{h} 19^{m} 21.70^{s}	+03° 22′ 12.7″	29.8
HD 102365 (in Centaurus)	A	G3V	4.89	5.06	11^{h} 46^{m} 31.07^{s}	−40° 30′ 01.3″	30.1
γ Pavonis		F6V	4.21	4.39	21^{h} 26^{m} 26.61^{s}	−65° 21′ 58.3″	30.2
61 Ursae Majoris		G8V	5.31	5.41	11^{h} 41^{m} 03.02^{s}	+34° 12′ 05.9″	31.1
HR 4458 (in Hydra)	A	K0V	5.96	6.06	11^{h} 34^{m} 29.49^{s}	−32° 49′ 52.8″	31.2
12 Ophiuchi		K2V	5.77	5.82	16^{h} 36^{m} 21.45^{s}	−02° 19′ 28.5″	31.8
Gliese 638 (in Hercules)		K7V	8.10	8.15	16^{h} 45^{m} 06.35^{s}	+33° 30′ 33.2″	31.9

== Stars between 10 and 13 parsecs ==
These stars are estimated to be from 32.7 to 42.4 light years distant from the Sun.

Star Designation		Stellar Class	Magnitude		Right Ascension (J2000)	Declination (J2000)	Distance (Light-years)
Star Designation		Stellar Class	Apparent	Absolute	Right Ascension (J2000)	Declination (J2000)	Distance (Light-years)
HR 511		K0V	5.63	5.61	01^{h} 47^{m} 44.83^{s}	+63° 51′ 09.0″	32.8
HR 5256		K3V	6.49	6.47	13^{h} 57^{m} 32.06^{s}	+61° 29′ 34.3″	33.0
α Mensae		G5V	5.08	5.05	06^{h} 10^{m} 13.93^{s}	−74° 45′ 11.0″	33.1
Gliese 453		K4V	6.99	6.95	11^{h} 57^{m} 57.63^{s}	−27° 42′ 25.4″	33.2
Pollux		K0IIIb	1.16	1.09	07^{h} 45^{m} 18.95^{s}	+28° 01′ 34.3″	33.7
HD 17925 (32 G. Eridani)		K1V	6.05	5.97	02^{h} 52^{m} 31.65^{s}	−12° 46′ 11.0″	33.9
ι Persei		G0V	4.05	3.94	03^{h} 09^{m} 04.02^{s}	+49° 36′ 47.8″	34.4
Wolf 635	A	K7 V	7.70	7.54	17^{h} 05^{m} 04.47^{s}	−05° 03′ 59.4″	35.1
HR 9038	A	K3V	6.36	6.19	23^{h} 52^{m} 25.32^{s}	+75° 32′ 40.5″	35.2
ζ Herculis (Tianji)	A	F9IV	2.91	2.74	16^{h} 41^{m} 17.16^{s}	+31° 36′ 09.8″	35.2
ζ Herculis (Tianji)	B	G7V	5.43	5.26	16^{h} 41^{m} 17.16^{s}	+31° 36′ 09.8″	35.2
δ Trianguli (Deltoton)		G0V	4.84	4.66	02^{h} 17^{m} 03.23^{s}	+34° 13′ 27.2″	35.4
β Virginis (Zavijava)		F8V	3.59	3.40	11^{h} 50^{m} 41.72^{s}	+01° 45′ 53.0″	35.6
Gliese 86	A	K0V	6.12	5.93	02^{h} 10^{m} 22.07^{s}	−50° 49′ 25.4″	35.6
Gliese 688	A	K3V	6.53	6.38	17^{h} 39^{m} 16.92^{s}	+03° 33′ 18.9″	35.9
HR 6806		K2V	6.38	6.15	18^{h} 09^{m} 37.42^{s}	+38° 27′ 28.0″	36.0
HD 115404	A	K1V	6.52	6.27	13^{h} 16^{m} 51.05^{s}	+17° 01′ 01.8″	36.1
Denebola		A3Vvar	2.14	1.92	11^{h} 49^{m} 03.58^{s}	+14° 34′ 19.4″	36.2
54 Piscium		K0V	5.88	5.65	00^{h} 39^{m} 21.81^{s}	+21° 15′ 01.7″	36.2
γ Serpentis		F6V	3.85	3.62	15^{h} 56^{m} 27.18^{s}	+15° 39′ 41.8″	36.3
Gliese 320		K2V	6.58	6.35	08^{h} 43^{m} 18.48^{s}	−38° 52′ 56.6″	36.3
HD 85512		K5V	7.67	7.43	09^{h} 51^{m} 06.31^{s}	−43° 30′ 10.0″	36.4
11 Leonis Minoris	A	G8V	5.40	5.16	09^{h} 35^{m} 39.50^{s}	+35° 48′ 36.5″	36.5
θ Persei	A	F7V	4.10	3.85	02^{h} 44^{m} 11.99^{s}	+49° 13′ 42.4″	36.6
Arcturus (α Boötis)		K1.5III	−0.05	−0.31	14^{h} 15^{m} 39.67^{s}	+19° 10′ 56.7″	36.7
η Boötis	A/B	G0IV	2.68	2.41	13^{h} 54^{m} 41.08^{s}	+18° 23′ 51.8″	37.0
HD 222237		K3V	7.09	6.81	23^{h} 39^{m} 36.83^{s}	−72° 43′ 19.8″	37.2
Gliese 169		K7V	8.30	8.00	04^{h} 29^{m} 00.12^{s}	+21° 55′ 21.7″	37.4
HR 5553	A/B	K2V	6.00	5.69	14^{h} 53^{m} 23.77^{s}	+19° 09′ 10.1″	37.6
ζ Doradus	A	F7V	4.71	4.38	05^{h} 05^{m} 30.72^{s}	−57° 28′ 21.7″	38.0
λ Serpentis		G0Vvar	4.42	4.07	15^{h} 46^{m} 26.61^{s}	+07° 21′ 11.1″	38.3
ι Pegasi	A/B	F5V	3.77	3.42	22^{h} 07^{m} 00.67^{s}	+25° 20′ 42.4″	38.3
δ Capricorni	A	A5IV	2.73–2.93	2.37	21^{h} 47^{m} 02.13^{s}	−16° 07′ 38.2″	38.6
γ Virginis	A	F0V	3.46	3.10	12^{h} 41^{m} 40.36^{s}	−01° 26′ 57.7″	38.6
γ Virginis	B	F0V	3.52	3.16	12^{h} 41^{m} 40.36^{s}	−01° 26′ 57.7″	38.6
Gliese 542		K3V	6.66	6.29	14^{h} 19^{m} 05.88^{s}	−59° 22′ 44.5″	38.6
Gliese 414	A	K7V	8.30	7.92	11^{h} 11^{m} 05.2^{s}	+30° 26′ 45.6″	38.9
ζ^{2} Reticuli		G1V	5.24	4.83	03^{h} 18^{m} 09.45^{s}	−62° 30′ 22.9″	39.4
ζ Trianguli Australis	A	F9V	4.91	4.50	16^{h} 28^{m} 27.46^{s}	−70° 05′ 03.8″	39.5
ζ^{1} Reticuli		G2V	5.53	5.11	03^{h} 17^{m} 42.77^{s}	−62° 34′ 31.2″	39.5
Gliese 798		K7 V	8.83	8.41	20^{h} 42^{m} 18.72^{s}	−52° 41′ 57.1″	39.5
HR 3384		G9V	6.38	5.95	08^{h} 32^{m} 52.91^{s}	−31° 30′ 03.1″	39.8
V538 Aurigae		K1Ve	6.21	5.77	05^{h} 41^{m} 20.33^{s}	+53° 28′ 51.8″	39.9
β Trianguli Australis		F1V	2.83	2.38	15^{h} 55^{m} 08.92^{s}	−63° 25′ 50.6″	40.1
85 Pegasi	A	G3V	5.81	5.34	00^{h} 02^{m} 10.10^{s}	+27° 04′ 56.1″	40.5
85 Pegasi	B	K6V	8.88	8.41	00^{h} 02^{m} 10.10^{s}	+27° 04′ 56.1″	40.5
HD 101581		K5V	7.77	7.28	11^{h} 41^{m} 03.55^{s}	−44° 24′ 18.7″	40.8
ρ^{1} Cancri	A	G8V	5.96	5.47	08^{h} 52^{m} 35.85^{s}	+28° 19′ 50.9″	40.9
HD 69830 (285 G. Puppis)		K0V	5.95	5.45	08^{h} 18^{m} 23.62^{s}	−12° 37′ 55.8″	41.0
Gliese 67	A	G1.5V	4.95	4.30	01^{h} 41^{m} 47.1^{s}	+42° 36′ 48.1″	41.2
λ Aurigae		G0V	4.69	4.18	05^{h} 19^{m} 08.38^{s}	+40° 05′ 56.6″	41.2
HD 14412 (22 G. Fornacis)		G8V	6.33	5.81	02^{h} 18^{m} 58.77^{s}	−25° 56′ 44.5″	41.3
HD 104304 (24 G. Virginis)		K0IV	5.54	4.99	12^{h} 00^{m} 44.28^{s}	−10° 26′ 45.7″	41.6
44 Boötis	A	F9V	5.20	4.67	15^{h} 03^{m} 47.43^{s}	+47° 39′ 14.6″	41.6
44 Boötis	B/C	G2V	5.97	5.44	15^{h} 03^{m} 47.43^{s}	+47° 39′ 14.6″	41.6
HD 158633		K0V	6.44	5.90	17^{h} 25^{m} 00.59^{s}	+67° 18′ 24.1″	41.7
HD 40307		K3V	7.17	6.63	05^{h} 54^{m} 04.33^{s}	−60° 01′ 24.5″	41.8
36 Ursae Majoris	A	F8V	4.82	4.28	10^{h} 30^{m} 37.66^{s}	+55° 58′ 49.9″	41.9
HD 147513 (62 G. Scorpii)		G3V	5.37	4.82	16^{h} 24^{m} 01.19^{s}	−39° 11′ 34.7″	42.0
Gliese 428 (it)	A	K7V	7.51	6.96	11^{h} 24^{m} 41.24^{s}	−61° 38′ 51.2″	42.0
Gliese 428 (it)	B	M0Ve	8.82	8.27	11^{h} 24^{m} 41.24^{s}	−61° 38′ 51.2″	42.0
Gliese 349 (es)		K3V	7.20	6.68	09^{h} 29^{m} 54.82^{s}	+05° 39′ 18.5″	42.1

== Stars between 13 and 15 parsecs ==
These stars are estimated to be from 42.5 to 48.9 light years distant from the Sun. A value of 48.9 light years corresponds to a minimum parallax of 66.7 mas.

Star Designation		Stellar Class	Magnitude		Right Ascension (J2000)	Declination (J2000)	Distance (Light-years)
Star Designation		Stellar Class	Apparent	Absolute	Right Ascension (J2000)	Declination (J2000)	Distance (Light-years)
HD 36003 (it)		K5V	7.65	7.08	05^{h} 28^{m} 26^{s}	−03° 29′ 58″	42.5
HD 172051 (86 G. Sagittarii)		G5V	5.85	5.28	18^{h} 38^{m} 53.49^{s}	−21° 03′ 06.7″	42.6
HD 166348		K7V	8.23	7.65	18^{h} 12^{m} 21^{s}	−43° 26′ 41″	42.6
Gliese 167		K5V	7.62	7.03	04^{h} 15^{m} 57^{s}	−53° 18′ 35″	42.8
Capella	Aa	G5III	0.76	0.20	05^{h} 16^{m} 41.34^{s}	+45° 59′ 52.8″	42.9
Capella	Ab	G1III	0.91	0.35	05^{h} 16^{m} 41.34^{s}	+45° 59′ 52.8″	42.9
SZ Crateris	A	K5V	8.61	8.0	11^{h} 21^{m} 27^{s}	−20° 27′ 14″	42.9
Gliese 716		K2V	6.81	6.21	18^{h} 31^{m} 19^{s}	−18° 54′ 30″	43.1
Gliese 146		K5V	8.95	8.34	03^{h} 35^{m} 01^{s}	−48° 25′ 09″	43.1
V1654 Aquilae		K4V	7.45	6.84	20^{h} 02^{m} 47^{s}	+03° 19′ 34″	43.1
Gliese 69		K5V	8.35	7.74	01^{h} 43^{m} 41^{s}	+63° 49′ 24″	43.1
58 Eridani		G1V	5.63	5.01	04^{h} 47^{m} 36^{s}	−16° 56′ 04″	43.4
Gliese 528	A	K4V	7.96	7.32	13^{h} 49^{m} 04^{s}	+26° 58′ 47″	43.7
Gliese 528	B	K6V	8.35	7.71	13^{h} 49^{m} 04^{s}	+26° 58′ 47″	43.7
υ Andromedae	A	F8V	4.10	4.63	01^{h} 36^{m} 48^{s}	+41° 24′ 20″	43.7
Gliese 556		K3V	7.32	6.67	14^{h} 33^{m} 29^{s}	+52° 54′ 32″	44.0
θ Ursae Majoris		F6IV	3.02	2.37	09^{h} 32^{m} 52^{s}	+51° 40′ 43″	44.0
LHS 3508		K5V	7.91	7.24	20^{h} 02^{m} 35^{s}	−50° 03′ 06″	44.3
V834 Tau		K3V	8.03	7.36	04^{h} 41^{m} 19^{s}	+20° 54′ 05″	44.4
Gliese 853	A	G1-3V	5.33	4.66	22^{h} 18^{m} 15^{s}	−53° 37′ 32″	44.4
Gliese 868		K5V	7.93	7.25	22^{h} 40^{m} 43^{s}	−29° 40′ 28″	44.5
Gliese 5		G8V	5.92	5.23	00^{h} 06^{m} 37^{s}	+29° 01′ 19″	44.7
β Aquilae	A	G8IV	3.75	3.06	19^{h} 55^{m} 19^{s}	+06° 24′ 29″	44.7
10 Tauri		F9V	4.29	3.60	03^{h} 36^{m} 53^{s}	+00° 24′ 10″	44.7
Gliese 656		K0V	7.28	6.58	17^{h} 10^{m} 10^{s}	−60° 43′ 44″	44.9
ι Piscium		F7V	4.06	3.36	23^{h} 39^{m} 57^{s}	+05° 37′ 38″	45.0
γ Cephei	A	K1IV	2.94	2.24	23^{h} 39^{m} 21^{s}	+77° 37′ 56″	45.0
Gliese 615		K0V	7.36	6.66	16^{h} 13^{m} 49^{s}	−57° 34′ 14″	45.1
Gliese 898		K5/M0V	8.38	7.68	23^{h} 32^{m} 49^{s}	−16° 50′ 44″	45.1
36 Ursae Majoris	B	K7Ve	8.77	8.06	10^{h} 30^{m} 25^{s}	+56° 00′ 00″	45.2
18 Scorpii		G1V	5.50	4.76	16^{h} 15^{m} 37^{s}	−08° 22′ 06″	45.3
HD 23356		K2V	7.1	6.4	03^{h} 43^{m} 56^{s}	−19° 06′ 42″	45.5
τ^{1} Eridani	A/B	F5/F6V	4.47	3.74	02^{h} 45^{m} 06^{s}	−18° 34′ 22″	45.5
Gliese 529		K5.5Vk	8.36	7.62	13^{h} 49^{m} 45^{s}	−22° 06′ 40″	45.9
Gliese 726		K5	8.91	8.17	18^{h} 47^{m} 27^{s}	−03° 38′ 23″	45.9
Gliese 282	A	K2V	7.26	6.52	07^{h} 39^{m} 59^{s}	−03° 35′ 51″	45.9
Gliese 282	B	K5	9.02	8.28	07^{h} 39^{m} 59^{s}	−03° 35′ 51″	45.9
47 Ursae Majoris		G0V	5.03	4.29	10^{h} 59^{m} 28^{s}	+40° 25′ 48″	45.9
Gliese 532		K5	8.99	8.24	13^{h} 52^{m} 00^{s}	+49° 57′ 03″	46.0
26 Draconis	A	F9V	5.06	4.31	17^{h} 34^{m} 60^{s}	+61° 52′ 30″	46.0
26 Draconis	B	K3V	7.95	7.20	17^{h} 34^{m} 60^{s}	+61° 52′ 30″	46.0
α Fornacis	A	F7IV	3.80	3.05	03^{h} 12^{m} 04^{s}	−28° 59′ 21″	46.0
α Fornacis	B	G7V	6.73	5.98	03^{h} 12^{m} 04^{s}	−28° 59′ 21″	46.0
Gliese 42		K2V	7.48	6.72	00^{h} 53^{m} 01^{s}	−30° 21′ 25″	46.2
Gliese 481		K4V	7.91	7.13	12^{h} 41^{m} 06^{s}	+15° 22′ 36″	46.2
Gliese 611	A	G8V	6.71	5.94	16^{h} 04^{m} 57^{s}	+39° 09′ 23″	46.4
HD 150689		K2V	7.39	6.62	16^{h} 44^{m} 14^{s}	−38° 56′ 36″	46.4
HR 7578		K3V	6.23	5.46	19^{h} 54^{m} 18^{s}	−23° 56′ 28″	46.4
π^{1} Ursae Majoris		G1V	5.63	4.86	08^{h} 39^{m} 12^{s}	+65° 01′ 15″	46.6
Ras Alhague	A	A5III	2.08	1.30	17^{h} 34^{m} 56^{s}	+12° 33′ 36″	46.7
η Cephei		K0IV	3.42	2.63	20^{h} 45^{m} 17^{s}	+61° 50′ 20″	46.8
Gliese 613		K3V	7.12	6.33	16^{h} 09^{m} 43^{s}	−56° 26′ 46″	46.8
72 Herculis		G0V	5.38	4.59	17^{h} 20^{m} 39^{s}	+32° 28′ 13″	46.9
Gliese 796		G8V	6.37	5.58	20^{h} 40^{m} 12^{s}	−23° 46′ 24″	46.9
Gliese 481		K2	7.86	7.07	12^{h} 41^{m} 06^{s}	+15° 22′ 36″	47.0
Gliese 546		K5V	8.37	7.57	14^{h} 21^{m} 57^{s}	+29° 37′ 47″	47.1
Gliese 420		dK5	8.06	7.26	11^{h} 15^{m} 12^{s}	+73° 28′ 31″	47.1
ν^{2} Lupi		G2V	5.66	4.84	15^{h} 21^{m} 48^{s}	−48° 19′ 04″	47.5
θ Boötis	A	F7V	4.10	3.28	14^{h} 25^{m} 12^{s}	+51° 51′ 06″	47.5
Gliese 269	A	K2V	8.08	7.26	07^{h} 17^{m} 30^{s}	−46° 58′ 45″	47.6
Gliese 833		K2V	7.31	6.48	21^{h} 36^{m} 41^{s}	−50° 50′ 43″	47.7
ι Ursae Majoris	A	A7V	3.23	2.40	08^{h} 59^{m} 13^{s}	+48° 02′ 32″	47.7
Gliese 259		K1V	6.88	6.05	07^{h} 01^{m} 14^{s}	−25° 56′ 55″	47.7
111 Tauri	A	F8V	5.00	4.17	05^{h} 24^{m} 25^{s}	+17° 23′ 00″	47.8
111 Tauri	B	dK5e	7.83	7.00	05^{h} 23^{m} 38^{s}	+17° 19′ 27″	47.8
ψ Serpentis		G5V	5.86	5.03	15^{h} 44^{m} 02^{s}	+02° 30′ 55″	47.8
Gliese 604		K5V	8.05	7.22	15^{h} 57^{m} 41^{s}	−42° 37′ 27″	47.8
ψ Capricorni		F5V	4.14	3.30	20^{h} 46^{m} 06^{s}	−25° 16′ 14″	47.9
HD 97584	A	K4V	7.68	6.85	11^{h} 15^{m} 12^{s}	+73° 28′ 31″	47.9
Gliese 14		K7V	9.02	8.19	00^{h} 17^{m} 06^{s}	+40° 56′ 54″	47.9
HD 19305		M0V	9.05	8.21	03^{h} 06^{m} 27^{s}	+01° 57′ 55″	48
OU Geminorum		K2Ve	6.76	5.91	06^{h} 26^{m} 10^{s}	+18° 45′ 25″	48.2
α Corvi		F2V	4.02	3.17	12^{h} 08^{m} 25^{s}	−24° 43′ 44″	48.2
20 Leonis Minoris	A	G3Va	5.40	4.50	10^{h} 01^{m} 01^{s}	+31° 55′ 25″	48.6
AB Doradus	A	K1Vp	6.98	5.86	05^{h} 28^{m} 45^{s}	−65° 26′ 55″	48.7
ν Phoenicis		F8V	4.57	3.70	01^{h} 15^{m} 11^{s}	−45° 31′ 54″	48.7
Gliese 1021		G5V	5.80	4.93	00^{h} 45^{m} 45^{s}	−47° 33′ 06″	48.7
Gliese 52		K7V	8.98	8.10	01^{h} 07^{m} 09^{s}	+63° 56′ 30″	48.8
Gliese 1279		K5V	8.50	7.62	23^{h} 09^{m} 41^{s}	−67° 44′ 00″	48.8
Alderamin		A7IV-V	2.45	1.58	21^{h} 18^{m} 35^{s}	+62° 35′ 08″	48.8
Gliese 738	A	G0V	6.22	5.34	18^{h} 57^{m} 02^{s}	+32° 54′ 05″	48.9
Gliese 738	B	K1V	7.53	6.65	18^{h} 57^{m} 02^{s}	+32° 54′ 05″	48.9

== See also ==
- Lists of astronomical objects
- Interstellar travel
- Lists of stars
  - List of nearest stars and brown dwarfs
  - List of star systems within 20–25 light-years
  - List of star systems within 25–30 light-years
  - List of star systems within 30–35 light-years
  - List of star systems within 35–40 light-years
  - List of star systems within 40–45 light-years
  - List of star systems within 45–50 light-years
  - List of star systems within 50–55 light-years
  - List of star systems within 55–60 light-years
  - List of star systems within 60–65 light-years
  - List of star systems within 65–70 light-years
  - List of star systems within 70–75 light-years
  - List of star systems within 75–80 light-years
- Nearby Stars Database
- Search for extraterrestrial intelligence (SETI)
- Stellar parallax
