= List of star systems within 40–45 light-years =

This is a list of star systems within 40–45 light years of Earth.

== List ==
Key
#	Visible to the unaided eye
$	Bright star (absolute magnitude of +8.5 or brighter)
‡	White dwarf
§	Brown dwarf or sub-brown dwarf
*	Nearest in constellation

System	Star or (sub-) brown dwarf	Distance (ly)	Constellation	Coordinates: RA, Dec (Ep J2000, Eq J2000)	Stellar class	Apparent magnitude (V)	Parallax (mas)	Notes and additional references
Gliese 179		40.1 ^{+2.1}_{−1.9}	Orion	04^{h} 52^{m} 05.73212^{s} +06° 28′ 35.5887″	M4V	11.96		has 1 known planet (b), and a candidate (c)
Beta Trianguli Australis		40.2 ± 0.3	Triangulum Australe	04^{h} 52^{m} 05.73212^{s} +06° 28′ 35.5887″	F1V	2.85		
Gliese 806		40.2 ± 0.9	Cygnus	20^{h} 45^{m} 04.09925^{s} +44° 29′ 56.6451″	M1.5V	10.84		
55 Cancri (Rho¹ Cancri/Copernicus)	A	40.25 ± 0.37	Cancer	08^{h} 52^{m} 35.8111^{s} +28° 19′ 50.955″	G8V	5.95/13.15		Has 4 confirmed exoplanets around 55 Cancri A (55 Cancri b/Galileo, c/Brahe, e/Janssen and f/Harriot), 2 candidates (g, d/Lipperhey), and 2 confirmed exoplanets around 55 Cancri B.
55 Cancri (Rho¹ Cancri/Copernicus)	B	40.25 ± 0.37	Cancer	08^{h} 52^{m} 35.8111^{s} +28° 19′ 50.955″	M4V			Has 4 confirmed exoplanets around 55 Cancri A (55 Cancri b/Galileo, c/Brahe, e/Janssen and f/Harriot), 2 candidates (g, d/Lipperhey), and 2 confirmed exoplanets around 55 Cancri B.
Gliese 435		40.8 ± 0.5	Centaurus	11^{h} 41^{m} 02.46847^{s} -44° 24′ 18.6867″	KV			
Gliese 4360	A	40.77 ± 0.65			M5			
Gliese 4360	B	40.77 ± 0.65			M5			
WISE 1051-2138		40.8			T9			
WISE J0457-0207		40.8 ± 10.1			T2			
LHS 1140		41	Cetus	00^{h} 44^{m} 59.33091^{s} -15° 16′ 17.5428″	M4.5V	14.18		has 2 known planets and 1 candidate
HD 69830		41.0 ± 0.4	Puppis	08^{h} 18^{m} 23.94697^{s} -12° 37′ 55.8172″	G8V	5.98		has 3 known planets
ULAS J0034-00		41.0 ^{+2.1}_{−1.9}	00^{h} 34^{m} 02.771^{s} -00° 52′ 06.78″		Y0			
WISE 1542+2230		41.1			T9.5			
Gliese 1132		41.15 ± 0.02	Vela	10^{h} 14^{m} 51.77869^{s} -47° 09′ 24.1928″	M4	13.46		has 2 known planets
HR 483	A	41.2 ± 0.4	Andromeda	01^{h} 41^{m} 47.1431^{s} +42° 36′ 48.444″	G1.5V	4.95/12.5		
HR 483	B	41.2 ± 0.4	Andromeda	01^{h} 41^{m} 47.1431^{s} +42° 36′ 48.444″	MV			
Lambda Aurigae (Al Hurr)$		41.2 ± 0.5	Auriga	05^{h} 19^{m} 08.475^{s} +40° 05′ 56.59″	G1V	4.71#		
Gliese 142		41.2 ± 1.2			K3.5V			
HD 175224		41.2 ± 1.6			MV			
Innes' star		41.3	Carina	11^{h} 16^{m} 00.20445^{s} -57° 32′ 51.5751″	MV			has 1 known planet
HD 14412		41.4 ± 0.4	Fornax	02^{h} 18^{m} 58.50469^{s} -25° 56′ 44.4735″	G8V	6.33		
Gliese 349		41.4 ± 0.6	Hydra		KV			
44 Boötis (i Boötis/Quadrans)	A	41.6 ± 0.3	Boötes	15^{h} 03^{m} 47.29565^{s} +47° 39′ 14.6228″	G0V	4.75		
44 Boötis (i Boötis/Quadrans)	B	41.6 ± 0.3	Boötes	15^{h} 03^{m} 47.29565^{s} +47° 39′ 14.6228″	F			
2MASS J0523-1403		41.62		05^{h} 23^{m} 38.221^{s} -14° 03′ 02.29″	L2.5	21.05		
HD 158633		41.7 ± 0.3	Draco	17^{h} 25^{m} 00.09827^{s} +67° 18′ 24.1501″	K0V	6.43		41.7 ± 0.3
Gliese 3707		41.75 ± 1.30			M3.5V			
HD 40307		41.8 ± 0.3	Pictor	05^{h} 54^{m} 04.24050^{s} -60° 01′ 24.4930″	K2.5V	7.17		has 6 known planets
36 Ursae Majoris		41.9 ± 0.4	Ursa Major	10^{h} 30^{m} 37.5793^{s} +55° 58′ 49.940″	F8V	4.82		
HD 147513		42.0 ± 0.5	Scorpius	16^{h} 24^{m} 01.28927^{s} -39° 11′ 34.7121″	G1V	5.38		has 1 known planet
Gliese 428		42.0 ± 1			KV			
WISE 0857+5604		42.1			T8			
HD 104304	A	42.1 ± 0.4	Virgo	12^{h} 00^{m} 44.461^{s} -10° 26′ 46.06″	G8IV	5.54		
HD 104304	B	42.1 ± 0.4	Virgo	12^{h} 00^{m} 44.461^{s} -10° 26′ 46.06″	M4V			
Capella (Alpha Aurigae)	Aa$	42.919±0.049	Auriga	05^{h} 16^{m} 41.35871^{s} +45° 59′ 52.7693″	G8III-G3III:	0.08#		
Capella (Alpha Aurigae)	Ab	42.919±0.049	Auriga	05^{h} 16^{m} 41.35871^{s} +45° 59′ 52.7693″	G0III-G1III			
Capella (Alpha Aurigae)	H	43.52 ± 0.01	Auriga	05^{h} 16^{m} 41.35871^{s} +45° 59′ 52.7693″	M2.5 V			
Capella (Alpha Aurigae)	L	43.38 ± 0.03	Auriga	05^{h} 16^{m} 41.35871^{s} +45° 59′ 52.7693″	M4:			
Wolf 1473		42.26 ± 0.92			M3.5			
Gliese 204		42.3 ± 0.5	Orion		KV			
HD 166348		42.3 ± 0.7	Corona Australis		M0V	8.38		
WISE 2019-1148		42.4			T8.5			
HD 172051		42.4 ± 0.5	Sagittarius	18^{h} 38^{m} 53.40151^{s} -21° 03′ 06.7415″	G5V	5.85		
Gliese 521		42.4 ± 0.9	Canis Venatici	13^{h} 39^{m} 24.10228^{s} +46° 11′ 11.3631″	M1V	10.26		
GRW +70 8247		42.4 ^{+1.3}_{−1.2}	Draco	19^{h} 00^{m} 10.2534^{s} +70° 39′ 51.418″	DA:w	13.2		
Gliese 1001	A	42.44 ± 2.08			M4V			
Gliese 1001	B	42.44 ± 2.08			L5			
WISE 2134-7137		42.7			T9			
WISE 2359-7335		42.7			T5.5			
Gliese 167		42.7 ± 0.3	Dorado	04^{h} 15^{m} 56.90154^{s} -53° 18′ 35.3067″	K5V	7.62		
HD 190007		42.8 ± 0.6	Aquila	20^{h} 02^{m} 47.04569^{s} +03° 19′ 34.2658″	K4V	7.45		has 1 known planet
SZ Crateris		42.9 ± 1	Crater	11^{h} 21^{m} 26.6594^{s} -20° 27′ 13.790″	KV	8.1		
HD 170657		43.1 ± 0.5	Sagittarius	18^{h} 31^{m} 18.96122^{s} -18° 54′ 31.7326″	K2V	6.82		
58 Eridani		43.4 ± 0.5	Eridanus	04^{h} 47^{m} 36.29171^{s} -16° 56′ 04.04″	G1.5V	5.49		
CW Ursae Majoris		43.6	Ursa Major		M3.5V			
Gliese 146		43.6 ± 0.5		03^{h} 35^{m} 00.93987^{s} -48° 25′ 08.9085″	K6.5V	8.64		has 1 known planet
Gliese 1267		43.6 ± 0.8			KV			
Gliese 556		43.8 ± 0.4			KV			
Gliese 69		43.8 ± 0.7		01^{h} 43^{m} 40.72450^{s} +63° 49′ 24.2390″	K5V	8.35		has 1 known planet
Upsilon Andromedae (Titawin)	B	43.97±0.02	Andromeda	01^{h} 36^{m} 50.40476^{s} +41° 23′ 32.1228″	M4.5V		74.1815±0.0356	Part of Upsilon Andromedae system.
Upsilon Andromedae (Titawin)	A$	44.0±0.1	Andromeda	01^{h} 36^{m} 47.84154^{s} +41° 24′ 19.6514″	F9V	4.10	74.1940±0.2083	Part of Upsilon Andromedae system. Has three confirmed exoplanets (b (Saffar), c (Samh) & d (Majraiti)).
Theta Ursae Majoris (Alhaud)		44.0 ± 0.4	Ursa Major	09^{h} 32^{m} 51.43390^{s} +51° 40′ 38.2811″	F6IV	3.166		
HD 29697		44.0 ± 0.8		04^{h} 41^{m} 18.85634^{s} +20° 54′ 05.4456″	K3V	8.00		
G 161-71		44.02 ± 0.84			M4.5			
Gliese 868		44.2 ± 0.7			K5V	7.93		
WISE 0359−5401		44.3 ± 1.2		03^{h} 59^{m} 34.06^{s} -54° 01′ 54.6″	Y0			
WISE 1311+0122		44.4			T9			
WISE 1952+7240		44.4			T4			
HD 211415	A	44.4 ± 0.4		22^{h} 18^{m} 15.6134^{s} -53° 37′ 37.467″	G0V	5.33/9.9		
HD 211415	B	44.4 ± 0.4		22^{h} 18^{m} 15.6134^{s} -53° 37′ 37.467″	MV			
Gliese 528	A	44.4 ± 0.7			K4V	7.96/8.35		
Gliese 528	B	44.4 ± 0.7			dK6			
G 29-38		44.4 ^{+2.6}_{−2.3}		23^{h} 28^{m} 47.6365^{s} +05° 14′ 54.235″	DAV4.4	13.03		Variable
WISE 0734-7157§		44.5 ± 0.4		07^{h} 34^{m} 44.02^{s} −71° 57′ 44″	Y0	20.41		
HD 154577		44.6 ± 0.6		17^{h} 10^{m} 10.35091^{s} -60° 43′ 43.5757″	K2.5Vk	7.385		
WISE 0513+0608		44.7			T6.5			
WISE 2255-3118		44.7			T8			
Beta Aquilae (Alshain)	A	44.36 ± 0.09	Aquila	19^{h} 55^{m} 18.793^{s} +06° 24′ 24.35″	G9.5 IV	3.87		
Beta Aquilae (Alshain)	B	44.36 ± 0.09	Aquila	19^{h} 55^{m} 18.793^{s} +06° 24′ 24.35″	M2.5 V	12.0		
HD 166		44.7 ± 0.5		00^{h} 06^{m} 36.7841^{s} +29° 01′ 17.4103″	G8V	6.09		
Gliese 215		44.7 ± 0.7			MV			
10 Tauri		44.8 ± 0.5	Taurus	03^{h} 36^{m} 52.38^{s} +00° 24′ 06.0″	F8V	4.28		
Gliese 615		44.8 ± 0.5			KV			
HD 166		44.9 ± 0.03		00^{h} 06^{m} 36.7841^{s} +29° 01′ 17.4103″	K0 Ve	6.15		
System	Star or (sub-) brown dwarf	Distance (ly)	Constellation	Coordinates: RA, Dec (Ep J2000, Eq J2000)	Stellar class	Apparent magnitude (V)	Parallax (mas)	Notes and additional references

== See also ==
- Lists of stars
- List of star systems within 35–40 light-years
- List of star systems within 45–50 light-years
- List of nearest stars and brown dwarfs
