= List of star systems within 45–50 light-years =

This is a list of star systems within 45–50 light years of Earth.

== List ==
Key
#	Visible to the unaided eye
$	Bright star (absolute magnitude of +8.5 or brighter)
‡	White dwarf
§	Brown dwarf or sub-brown dwarf
*	Nearest in constellation

System	Star or (sub-) brown dwarf	Distance (ly)	Constellation	Coordinates: RA, Dec (Ep J2000, Eq J2000)	Stellar class	Apparent magnitude (V)	Parallax (mas)	Notes and additional references
WISE J0304−2705		45 ± 2		03^{h} 04^{m} 48.95^{s} −27° 05′ 13.35″	Y0pec			
WISE 2226+0440		45.0			T8			
Gamma Cephei (Errai)	A$	45.0 ± 0.3	Cepheus	23^{h} 39^{m} 20.910^{s} +77° 37′ 56.51″	K1IVe	3.22#		has 1 known planet
Gamma Cephei (Errai)	B	45.0 ± 0.3	Cepheus	23^{h} 39^{m} 20.910^{s} +77° 37′ 56.51″	M4V			has 1 known planet
Iota Piscium		45.0 ± 0.5	Pisces	23^{h} 39^{m} 57.04138^{s} +05° 37′ 34.6475″	F7V	4.13		
WISE 0323-6025		45.3			T8.5			
GJ 898		45.5 ± 0.9			KV			
Tau¹ Eridani		45.6 ± 0.5	Eridanus	02^{h} 45^{m} 06.18710^{s} −18° 34′ 21.2149″	F7V	4.46		
Alpha Fornacis (Dalim)	A$	45.66 ± 0.08	Fornax	03^{h} 12^{m} 04.5298^{s} −28° 59′ 15.439″	F6V	3.85#		The Closest Blue Straggler Star to Earth.
Alpha Fornacis (Dalim)	Ba	45.66 ± 0.08	Fornax	03^{h} 12^{m} 04.5298^{s} −28° 59′ 15.439″	G7V			The Closest Blue Straggler Star to Earth.
Alpha Fornacis (Dalim)	Bb	45.66 ± 0.08	Fornax	03^{h} 12^{m} 04.5298^{s} −28° 59′ 15.439″	D			The Closest Blue Straggler Star to Earth.
18 Scorpii		45.7 ± 0.6	Scorpius	16^{h} 15^{m} 37.27028^{s} −08° 22′ 09.9821″	G2Va	5.503		
Gliese 532		45.7 ± 0.6		13^{h} 52^{m} 00^{s} +49° 57′ 03″	KV	8.99		
WISE 0335+4310		45.7			T9			
WISE 0723+3403		45.7			T9			
HD 23356		45.8 ± 0.6		03^{h} 43^{m} 56^{s} −19° 06′ 42″	K2V	7.1		
47 Ursae Majoris (Chalawan)		45.9 ± 0.4	Ursa Major	10^{h} 59^{m} 27.9728^{s} +40° 25′ 48.921″	G1V	5.03		has 3 known planets
26 Draconis	A	45.9 ± 0.3	Draco	17^{h} 34^{m} 59.62474^{s} +61° 52′ 28.2418″	F9V	5.236		
26 Draconis	B	45.9 ± 0.3	Draco	17^{h} 34^{m} 59.62474^{s} +61° 52′ 28.2418″	K3V			
26 Draconis	C	45.9 ± 0.3	Draco	17^{h} 34^{m} 59.62474^{s} +61° 52′ 28.2418″	M1V			
Gliese 42		45.9 ± 0.5		00^{h} 53^{m} 01.1349^{s} −30° 21′ 24.891″	K3V	7.15		
Gliese 400		46.0 ± 1.6			MV			
WISE 0819-0335		46.0			T4			
WISE 2209-2734		46.0			T7			
WISE 2237+7228		46.0			T6			
WISE 2344+1034		46.0			T9			
Gliese 726		46.1 ± 0.8		18^{h} 47^{m} 27^{s} −03° 38′ 23″	K5V	8.70		
Gliese 529		46.3 ± 0.7		13^{h} 49^{m} 45^{s} −22° 06′ 40″	K5.5V	8.36		
Gliese 282	A	46.3 ± 0.6		07^{h} 39^{m} 59.329^{s} −03° 35′ 51.03″	K2V	7.30/9.01		
Gliese 282	B	46.3 ± 0.6		07^{h} 39^{m} 59.329^{s} −03° 35′ 51.03″	K7V			
Gliese 282	C	46.3 ± 0.6		07^{h} 39^{m} 59.329^{s} −03° 35′ 51.03″	M1.5Ve			
Gliese 2130	A	46.31 ± 0.99			M1.5			
Gliese 2130	B	46.31 ± 0.99			M2.5			
HR 7578		46.6		19^{h} 54^{m} 17.17.7453^{s} −23° 56′ 27.8630″	K3V	6.23		
Pi¹ Ursae Majoris		46.6 ± 0.5	Ursa Major	08^{h} 39^{m} 11.70440^{s} +65° 01′ 15.2667″	G1.5Vb	5.63		
Gliese 481		46.6 ± 0.7		12^{h} 41^{m} 06^{s} +15° 22′ 36″	K4V	7.91		
WISE 0458+6434	A	46.6 ^{+17.4}_{−9.9}		04^{h} 58^{m} 53.93^{s} +64° 34′ 52.72″	T8.5			
WISE 0458+6434	B	46.6 ^{+17.4}_{−9.9}		04^{h} 58^{m} 53.93^{s} +64° 34′ 52.72″	T9.5			
WISE 1828+2650		46.6 ^{+11.6}_{−7.8}		18^{h} 28^{m} 31.10^{s} 26° 50′ 37.79″	Y2			has 1 possible planet.
Alpha Ophiuchi (Rasalhague)	A$	46.7 ± 0.6	Ophiuchus	17^{h} 34^{m} 56.06945^{s} +12° 33′ 36.1346″	A5IVnn	2.07#		
Alpha Ophiuchi (Rasalhague)	B	46.7 ± 0.6	Ophiuchus	17^{h} 34^{m} 56.06945^{s} +12° 33′ 36.1346″	K6V			
Eta Cephei (Al Kidr)$		46.8 ± 0.3	Cepheus	20^{h} 45^{m} 17.37517^{s} +61° 50′ 19.6142″	K0IV	3.426#		
Gliese 613		46.8 ± 0.6		16^{h} 09^{m} 43^{s} −56° 26′ 46″	KV			
Gliese 611	A	46.9 ± 0.4			G8V	6.71		
Gliese 611	B	46.9 ± 0.4			M4V			
72 Herculis		46.9 ± 0.4	Hercules	17^{h} 20^{m} 39.56754^{s} +32° 28′ 03.8773″	G0V	5.377		
HD 150689		46.9 ± 0.7			K2V	7.39		
TYC 3135–52–1		46.95	Cygnus		M3V			Voyager 1 will flyby within 1 light-years to the star.
CWISEP J1935−1546	A	47 ± 3	Sagittarius	19^{h} 35^{m} 18.60792^{s} −15° 46′ 20.8074″	Y1			
CWISEP J1935−1546	B	47 ± 3	Sagittarius	19^{h} 35^{m} 18.60792^{s} −15° 46′ 20.8074″	Y1			
Gliese 546		47.0 ± 0.7			KV			
HIP 79431		47.0 ^{+2.2}_{−2.0}		16^{h} 12^{m} 41.77941^{s} −18° 52′ 31.8117″	M3V	11.337		has 1 known planet
WISE 0223-2932		47.0			T7.5			
WISE 0500-1223		47.0			T8			
WISE 1812+2721		47.0			T8.5			
WISE 0535-7500		47.0		05^{h} 35^{m} 16.8^{s} −75° 00′ 24.9″	Y1			
CM Draconis		47.1 ± 1.8	Draco	16^{h} 34^{m} 20.33027^{s} +57° 09′ 44.3689″	M4.5V	12.90		
VHS J125804.89-441232.4		47.1 ± 5.9			T6			
WISE 0744+5628		47.3			T8			
WISE 1309-1600		47.3			T?			
Theta Boötis (Asellus Primus)	A	47.5 ± 0.4	Boötes	14^{h} 25^{m} 11.797^{s} +51° 51′ 02.68″	F7V	4.05		
Theta Boötis (Asellus Primus)	B	47.5 ± 0.4	Boötes	14^{h} 25^{m} 11.797^{s} +51° 51′ 02.68″	M2.5V			
Gliese 1214 (Orkaria)		47.5 ± 0.4		17^{h} 15^{m} 18.93399^{s} +04° 57′ 50.0666″	MV	14.71		has 1 known planet
Nu² Lupi		47.5 ± 0.5	Lupus	15^{h} 21^{m} 48.14991^{s} −48° 19′ 03.4699″	G2V	5.78		has 3 known planets
HIP 79431 (Sharjah)		47.54 ± 0.02		16^{h} 12^{m} 41.77941^{s} −18° 52′ 31.8117″	M3V	11.34		
WISE 0040+0900		47.6			T7			
WISE 1018-2445		47.6			T8			
Iota Ursae Majoris (Talitha)$		47.7 ± 0.6	Ursa Major	08^{h} 59^{m} 12.45362^{s} +48° 02′ 30.5741″	A7IV	3.14#		
Gliese 259		47.7 ± 0.5		07^{h} 01^{m} 14^{s} −25° 56′ 55″	K1V	6.88		
111 Tauri	A	47.8 ± 0.7	Taurus	05^{h} 24^{m} 25.46328^{s} +17° 23′ 00.7264″	F8V	5.11		
111 Tauri	B	47.8 ± 0.7	Taurus	05^{h} 24^{m} 25.46328^{s} +17° 23′ 00.7264″	K5V			
HD 196761		47.8 ± 0.6		20^{h} 40^{m} 11.75511^{s} −23° 46′ 25.9186″	G8V	6.37		
OU Geminorum		47.8 ± 0.8	Gemini	06^{h} 26^{m} 10.2464^{s} +18° 45′ 24.896″	K3V	6.768		
Gliese 604		47.8 ± 0.7		15^{h} 57^{m} 41^{s} −42° 37′ 27″	KV			
Psi Capricorni (Yue)		47.9 ± 0.6	Capricornus	20^{h} 46^{m} 05.733^{s} −25° 16′ 15.23″	F5V	4.13		
Psi Serpentis	A	47.9 ± 0.6	Serpens	15^{h} 44^{m} 01.82075^{s} +02° 30′ 54.6340″	G5V	5.879		
Psi Serpentis	B	47.9 ± 0.6	Serpens	15^{h} 44^{m} 01.82075^{s} +02° 30′ 54.6340″	K2			
Gliese 420		47.9 ± 0.8			KV	8.06		
WISE 2018-7423		47.9			T7			
CWISEP J1047+5457		48 ± 3		10^{h} 47^{m} 57.50^{s} +54° 57′ 42.17″	Y1			
Gliese 833		48.1 ± 0.6		21^{h} 36^{m} 41^{s} −50° 50′ 43″	KV			
Alpha Corvi (Alchiba)$	A	48.2 ± 0.5	Corvus	12^{h} 08^{m} 24.81727^{s} −24° 43′ 43.9521″	F1V	4.13#		
Alpha Corvi (Alchiba)$	B	48.2 ± 0.5	Corvus	12^{h} 08^{m} 24.81727^{s} −24° 43′ 43.9521″	M4V			
Gliese 269		48.2 ± 0.6		07^{h} 17^{m} 30^{s} −46° 58′ 45″	KV			
BPM 37093 (V886 Centauri)		48.39 ± 0.01	Centaurus	12^{h} 38^{m} 49.78112^{s} −49° 48′ 00.2195″	DAV4.4	14.0		
LHS 3844 (Batsũ̀)		48.53 ± 0.01	Indus	22^{h} 41^{m} 58.11718^{s} −69° 10′ 08.3207″	M4.5-M5	15.26±0.03		
20 Leonis Minoris (Cor)		48.6 ± 0.6	Leo Minor	10^{h} 01^{m} 00.65688^{s} +31° 55′ 25.2130″	G3V	5.40		
WISE 0015-4615		48.6			T8			
WISE 2343-7418		48.6			T6			
HD 4391		48.7 ± 0.5		00^{h} 45^{m} 45.5930^{s} –47° 33′ 07.1438″	G3V	5.80		
Alpha Cephei (Alderamin)$		48.8 ± 0.4	Cepheus	21^{h} 18^{m} 34.7723^{s} +62° 35′ 08.069″	A8Vn	2.51#		
Gliese 123		48.8 ± 1.3			MV			
LHS 1140		48.80 ± 0.03		00^{h} 44^{m} 59.33091^{s} −15° 16′ 17.5428″	M4.5V	14.18		Has 2 exoplanets.
HD 176051	A	48.9 ± 0.4		18^{h} 57^{m} 01.60985^{s} +32° 54′ 04.5723″	G0V	5.22		has 1 known planet
HD 176051	B	48.9 ± 0.4		18^{h} 57^{m} 01.60985^{s} +32° 54′ 04.5723″	K1V			has 1 known planet
Gliese 14		48.9 ± 0.8			KV			
Gliese 163		48.9 ^{+1.4}_{−1.3}		04^{h} 09^{m} 15.66834^{s} −53° 22′ 25.2900″	M3.5V	11.8		has 5 known planets
WISEP J004701.06+680352.1		48.9 ± 16.3			L9pec			
HD 84117		49.0 ± 0.2		09^{h} 42^{m} 14.4162^{s} −23° 54′ 56.042″	F8V	4.94		
HD 200779 (Gliese 818)		49.07 ± 0.02	Equuleus*	21^{h} 05^{m} 19.74605^{s} +07° 04′ 09.4729″	K6V	8.27		
Eta Leporis$		49.1 ± 0.5	Lupus	05^{h} 56^{m} 24.29300^{s} −14° 10′ 03.7189″	F2V	3.719#		
Nu Phoenicis		49.1 ± 0.5	Phoenix	01^{h} 15^{m} 11.12143^{s} −45° 31′ 53.9926″	F9V	4.95		
Gliese 52		49.1 ± 0.9		01^{h} 07^{m} 09^{s} +63° 56′ 30″	K7V	8.98		
Gliese 483		49.1 ± 0.6			KV			
Castor (Alpha Geminorum)	Aa$	49.15 ± 0.03	Gemini	07^{h} 34^{m} 35.863^{s} +31° 53′ 17.79″	A1V	1.93/2.97/9.83#		3 pairs of stars (Note: Each main star has a dM1e companion)
Castor (Alpha Geminorum)	Ab	49.15 ± 0.03	Gemini	07^{h} 34^{m} 35.863^{s} +31° 53′ 17.79″	dM1e			3 pairs of stars
Castor (Alpha Geminorum)	Ba	49.15 ± 0.03	Gemini	07^{h} 34^{m} 35.863^{s} +31° 53′ 17.79″	Am			3 pairs of stars
Castor (Alpha Geminorum)	Bb	49.15 ± 0.03	Gemini	07^{h} 34^{m} 35.863^{s} +31° 53′ 17.79″	dM1e			3 pairs of stars
Castor (Alpha Geminorum)	Ca	49.15 ± 0.03	Gemini	07^{h} 34^{m} 35.863^{s} +31° 53′ 17.79″	dM1e			3 pairs of stars
Castor (Alpha Geminorum)	Cb	49.15 ± 0.03	Gemini	07^{h} 34^{m} 35.863^{s} +31° 53′ 17.79″	dM1e			3 pairs of stars
19 Draconis		49.2 ± 0.4	Draco	16^{h} 56^{m} 01.68925^{s} +65° 08′ 05.2631″	F8V	4.89		
GJ 1279		49.2 ± 0.7			KV			
Gliese 141		49.3 ± 0.7			KV			
31 Aquilae		49.4 ± 0.6	Aquila	19^{h} 24^{m} 58.20027^{s} +11° 56′ 39.8862″	G8IV	5.16		
AB Doradus	A	49.5 ± 0.4	Dorado	05^{h} 28^{m} 44.8489^{s} −65° 26′ 54.946″	K0V	6.98-7.06/13.0		
AB Doradus	Ba	49.5 ± 0.4	Dorado	05^{h} 28^{m} 44.8489^{s} −65° 26′ 54.946″	M5			
AB Doradus	Bb	49.5 ± 0.4	Dorado	05^{h} 28^{m} 44.8489^{s} −65° 26′ 54.946″	M5-6			
AB Doradus	C	49.5 ± 0.4	Dorado	05^{h} 28^{m} 44.8489^{s} −65° 26′ 54.946″	M8			
L 489-43		49.50 ± 0.81			M4.5			
171 G. Puppis		49.6 ± 0.4	Puppis	07^{h} 45^{m} 35.02168^{s} −34° 10′ 20.5143″	G0V	5.38		
Gliese 40		49.6 ± 1.1			KV			
HR 5864		49.7 ± 0.6			G7IV	6.01		
Mu Arae (Cervantes)		49.8 ± 0.6	Ara	17^{h} 44^{m} 08.70314^{s} −51° 50′ 02.5916″	G3V	5.12		has 4 known planets
Gliese 317		49.9 ± 0.4		08^{h} 40^{m} 59.2056^{s} −23° 27′ 22.5986″	M2.5V	11.98		has 2 known planets
SCR J1826-6542		49.12	Pavo		MV			
System	Star or (sub-) brown dwarf	Distance (ly)	Constellation	Coordinates: RA, Dec (Ep J2000, Eq J2000)	Stellar class	Apparent magnitude (V)	Parallax (mas)	Notes and additional references

== See also ==
- Lists of stars
- List of star systems within 40–45 light-years
- List of star systems within 50–55 light-years
- List of nearest stars and brown dwarfs
