= List of star systems within 30–35 light-years =

This is a list of star systems within 30–35 light years of Earth.

== List ==
Key
#	Visible to the unaided eye
$	Bright star (absolute magnitude of +8.5 or brighter)
‡	White dwarf
§	Brown dwarf or sub-brown dwarf
*	Nearest in constellation

System	Star or (sub-) brown dwarf	Distance (ly)	Constellation	Coordinates: RA, Dec (Ep J2000, Eq J2000)	Stellar class	Apparent magnitude (V)	Parallax (mas)	Notes and additional references
CFBDS J005910.90–011401.3 (CFBDS J005910-011401)§		30 ± 1	Cetus	00^{h} 59^{m} 10.83^{s} −01° 14′ 01.3″	T8.5			
GJ 3325		30.03 ± 0.72	Lepus		M3V	11.7		has 1 candidate planet
WISE 0458+6434 (WISEPC J045853.90+643451.9)	A§	30.1 ± 0.5	Camelopardalis	04^{h} 58^{m} 53.93^{s} +64° 34′ 52.72″	T8.5			
WISE 0458+6434 (WISEPC J045853.90+643451.9)	B§	30.1 ± 0.5	Camelopardalis	04^{h} 58^{m} 53.93^{s} +64° 34′ 52.72″	T9.5			
GJ 3421		30.1 ± 0.6	Lynx		M4.5V			
2MASS 1750-00§		30.10	Serpens		L5.5			
WISE 1804+3117§		30.2	Hercules		T9.5			
Gamma Pavonis$		30.20 ± 0.03	Pavo	21^{h} 26^{m} 26.60484^{s} −65° 21′ 58.3145″	F9VFe-1.4 CH-0.7	4.22#		
GJ 3135		30.25			M2.5+V	12.2		
Kappa¹ Ceti$		30.26 ± 0.05	Cetus	03^{h} 19^{m} 21.6964^{s} +03° 22′ 12.715″	G5Vv	4.84#		
SDSS J141624.08+134826.7 (SDSS J1416+1348)	A§	30.27 ± 0.06	Boötes	14^{h} 16^{m} 24.0740^{s} +13° 48′ 26.193″	sdL7			
SDSS J141624.08+134826.7 (SDSS J1416+1348)	B§	30.27 ± 0.06	Boötes	14^{h} 16^{m} 24.0740^{s} +13° 48′ 26.193″	T7.5p			
HD 102365 (66 G. Centauri/Gliese 442)	B	30.362 ± 0.010	Centaurus	11^{h} 46^{m} 32.68988^{s} −40° 29′ 47.6048″	M4V	15		has 1 known planet
HD 102365 (66 G. Centauri/Gliese 442)	A$	30.40 ± 0.02	Centaurus	11^{h} 46^{m} 31.07253^{s} −40° 30′ 01.2859″	G2V	4.88#		has 1 known planet
2MASS J0011+5908		30.37	Cassiopeia		M6V			
GJ 1123		30.51 ± 0.28	Chamaeleon		M4.5V	13.1		
Gliese 190		30.52 ± 0.18	Libra		M3.5V	10.3		
Gliese 226		30.60 ± 0.12	Camelopardalis		M2.5V			
GJ 3306 (LHS 194)‡		30.69 ± 0.39	Eridanus		DQ8			
Gliese 367 (Añañuca)		30.719 ± 0.004	Vela	09^{h} 44^{m} 29.83677^{s} −45° 46′ 35.4276″	M1.0V	10		has 3 known planets
Gliese 357		30.776 ± 0.007	Hydra	09^{h} 36^{m} 01.63722^{s} −21° 39′ 38.8776″	M2.5V	10.91		has 3 known planets
2MASS J11592743-5247188		30.9 ± 0.04	Centaurus		M9V			brown dwarf
2MASS 0034+0523§		30.9 ^{+2.4}_{−2.1}	Pisces		T6.5			
Gliese 694		30.92 ± 0.34	Ursa Major		M2V	10.5		
Gliese 176		30.937 ± 0.006	Taurus	04^{h} 42^{m} 55.7750^{s} +18° 57′ 29.396″	M2.5V	9.95		has 1 known planet
GJ 3512		30.976 ± 0.009	Ursa Major	08^{h} 41^{m} 20.12866^{s} +59° 29′ 50.4441″	dM5.5	15.05		has 2 known planets
GJ 1065		30.98 ± 0.98	Ursa Major		M3V	12.8		
CWISEP J1446−2317§		31 ± 2	Libra	14^{h} 46^{m} 07.43^{s} −23° 17′ 04.33″	Y1			probably 4–14 M_{J} object
GJ 1227		31.06 ± 1.78	Draco		M4.0V			
GJ 3380		31.075	Auriga		M5V			
HR 4458 (289 G. Hydrae)	B	31.164 ± 0.008	Hydra	11^{h} 34^{m} 29.48644^{s} −32° 49′ 52.8228″	DC8	5.97 + 15		
HR 4458 (289 G. Hydrae)	A$	31.177 ± 0.008	Hydra	11^{h} 34^{m} 29.48644^{s} −32° 49′ 52.8228″	K0V			
2MASS J11553952-3727350		31.2 ± 1.5	Centaurus		L2.3			
61 Ursae Majoris$		31.24 ± 0.04	Ursa Major	11^{h} 41^{m} 03.01594^{s} +34° 12′ 05.8824″	G8V	5.35#		
Wolf 1069		31.229 ± 0.008	Cygnus	20^{h} 26^{m} 05.30213^{s} +58° 34′ 22.6804″	dM5.0			Has one known potentially habitable planet
Gliese 358		31.36 ± 0.12	Hydra		M3V			
WISEA J1141−3326§		31.4 ± 0.9	Hydra	11^{h} 41^{m} 57.47^{s} −33° 26′ 34.57″	Y0			probably 3–8 M_{J} object
TYC 3251-1875-1		31.51 ± 5.90			MV			
LHS 6167		31.57 ± 0.30			M4.5V			
WISE J140533.32+835030.5		31.6 ± 5.5			L8			
Gliese 479		31.61 ± 0.68			M3V(e)			
AU Microscopii		31.683 ± 0.007	Microscopium	20^{h} 45^{m} 09.53250^{s} –31° 20′ 27.2379″	M1Ve	8.73		has 2-4 known planets
WISE J2030+0749§		31.7 ± 0.2		20^{h} 30^{m} 42.330^{s} +07° 49′ 35.78″	T1.5			
GJ 1138		31.70 ± 0.96			M5V			
Gliese 436 (Noquisi)		31.882 ± 0.009	Leo	11^{h} 42^{m} 11.09334^{s} +26° 42′ 23.6508″	M2.5V	10.67		has 1 known planet
LP 655-48		31.96 ± 0.33			M7.5Ve			
WISE 0811-8051§		32.0			T9.5			
GJ 3112 (LHS 145)‡		32.04 ± 0.25			DA8.1			
GJ 3253		32.11 ± 0.64			M5V			
Gliese 638$		32.114 ± 0.005	Hercules	16^{h} 45^{m} 06.35054^{s} +33° 30′ 33.2138″	K7.5Ve	8.11#		
Gliese 49		32.158 ± 0.005	Cassiopeia	01^{h} 02^{m} 38.86806^{s} +62° 20′ 42.1763″	M1.5V			has 1 known planet around Gliese 49
12 Ophiuchi (V2133 Ophiuchi)$		32.27 ± 0.02	Ophiuchus	16^{h} 36^{m} 21.44969^{s} −02° 19′ 28.5130″	K1V	5.77#		
GJ 3988		32.30 ± 0.01			M5V			has 1 known planet
HD 232979		32.320 ± 0.009			M0.5V	8.648		flare star
GJ 3119		32.36 ± 0.59			M4.5Ve			
Gliese 680		32.37 ± 0.26			M3V			
Gliese 569 (CE Boötis)	A	32.466 ± 0.007	Boötes	14^{h} 54^{m} 29.2362^{s} +16° 06′ 03.798″	M3V			Orbited by binary brown dwarfs
Gliese 569 (CE Boötis)	Ba	32.466 ± 0.007	Boötes	14^{h} 54^{m} 29.2362^{s} +16° 06′ 03.798″	M8.5			Orbited by binary brown dwarfs
Gliese 569 (CE Boötis)	Bb	32.466 ± 0.007	Boötes	14^{h} 54^{m} 29.2362^{s} +16° 06′ 03.798″	M8.5			Orbited by binary brown dwarfs
WISE 1614+1739§		32.6			T9	19.08		
ULAS 1335+11		32.6 ± 0.5	Virgo	13^{h} 35^{m} 53.45^{s} +11° 30′ 05.2″	T9			
HD 260655 (Gliese 239)		32.608 ± 0.007	Gemini	06^{h} 37^{m} 10.79880^{s} +17° 33′ 53.3332″	M0.0V	9.77 ± 0.11		has 2 known planets
GJ 1125		32.61 ± 0.17			M3.5Ve			
10 parsecs (about 32.616 ly)
GJ 3976		32.71 ± 1.02			M5V			
GJ 3182‡		32.73 ± 0.10			DAZ9.5			
HR 511 (V987 Cassiopeiae)$		32.75 ± 0.01	Cassiopeia	01^{h} 47^{m} 44.83444^{s} +63° 51′ 09.0110″	K0V	5.63		
Gliese 22 (V547 Cassiopeiae)	A	32.8 ± 0.7	Cassiopeia	00^{h} 32^{m} 29.4336^{s} +67° 14′ 08.409″	M2.5Ve	10.29		
Gliese 22 (V547 Cassiopeiae)	B	32.8 ± 0.7	Cassiopeia	00^{h} 32^{m} 29.4336^{s} +67° 14′ 08.409″	M3V	12.19		
Gliese 22 (V547 Cassiopeiae)	C	32.8 ± 0.7	Cassiopeia	00^{h} 32^{m} 29.4336^{s} +67° 14′ 08.409″	M	13.2		
HR 5256$		32.835 ± 0.006	Ursa Major	13^{h} 57^{m} 32.0592^{s} +61° 29′ 34.2994″	K3V	6.52		
WISE 1150+6302§		32.9			T8	17.72		
WISE 1318-1758§		32.9			T9			
Gliese 678.1 A		33.12 ± 0.10			M1.0Ve			
Gliese 453$		33.13 ± 0.19		11^{h} 57^{m} 57.63^{s} −27° 42′ 25.4″	K4+V			
Alpha Mensae (Hoerikwaggo)	A$	33.31 ± 0.02	Mensa	06^{h} 10^{m} 14.47261^{s} −74° 45′ 10.9585″	G7V	5.09#		
Alpha Mensae (Hoerikwaggo)	B	33.31 ± 0.02	Mensa	06^{h} 10^{m} 14.47261^{s} −74° 45′ 10.9585″	M3.5-6.5 V			
Gliese 339.1‡		33.52 ± 0.64			DC7P			
Gliese 1277		33.59 ± 0.33			M4.5			
SCR J0533-4257		33.75 ± 0.64			M4.5V			
2MASS 0559-1404§		33.76 ± 0.35	12^{h} 37^{m} 39.19632^{s} +65° 26′ 14.8092″		T4.5			
Pollux (Beta Geminorum)$		33.78 ± 0.09	Gemini	07^{h} 45^{m} 18.94987^{s} +28° 01′ 34.3160″	K0III	1.14#		17th brightest star in the night sky and the nearest red giant/red clump to our Solar system. Has one known planet (Pollux b (Thestias)), but its existence is disputed.
HD 17925 (32 G. Eridani)$		33.792 ± 0.009	Eridanus	02^{h} 52^{m} 32.12819^{s} −12° 46′ 10.9681″	K1V	6.04		
2MASS J2139+0220§		33.8 ± 0.4	Aquarius	21^{h} 39^{m} 26.769^{s} +02° 20′ 22.70″	T1.5			
Gliese 649		33.892 ± 0.009	Hercules	16^{h} 58^{m} 08.850^{s} +25° 44′ 38.97″	M1.0V	9.655		has 1 known planet
WISE 1322-2340§		33.9			T8	17.01		
2MASS 1237+6526§		34 ± 2	Draco	12^{h} 37^{m} 39.19632^{s} +65° 26′ 14.8092″	T6.5V	16.15		
Gliese 595		34.01 ± 1.87			M3			
Gliese 127.1‡		34.08 ± 0.62			DA3.0			
L 363-38 (GJ 3049)		34.25 ± 0.50			M3			has 1 known planet
2MASS 1047+2124§		34.4 ± 1.4	Leo	10^{h} 47^{m} 53.85456^{s} 21° 24′ 23.4684″	T6.5			
WD 0821-669‡		34.44 ± 0.20			DA9.8			
2MASS J00501994−3322402§		34.5 ± 0.9			T7			
Iota Persei$		34.50 ± 0.05	Perseus	03^{h} 09^{m} 04.019^{s} +49° 36′ 47.80″	G0V	4.05#		
L 98-59		34.599 ± 0.006	Volans	08^{h} 18^{m} 07.62144^{s} −68° 18′ 46.8054″	M3V	11.69±0.05		has 5 known planets and an unconfirmed planet.
Gliese 653/654	A	34.60 ± 0.35			K4/5V			
Gliese 653/654	B	34.60 ± 0.35			M1.5V			
WISE 0148-7202§		34.6	Tucana		T9.5			
2MASS J08251968+2115521§		34.8 ± 0.4			L7.5			
System	Star or (sub-) brown dwarf	Distance (ly)	Constellation	Coordinates: RA, Dec (Ep J2000, Eq J2000)	Stellar class	Apparent magnitude (V)	Parallax (mas)	Notes and additional references

== See also ==
- Lists of stars
- List of star systems within 25–30 light-years
- List of star systems within 35–40 light-years
- List of nearest stars
