= HD 115404 =

Binary star in the constellation Coma Berenices

Observation data Epoch J2000 Equinox ICRS
- Constellation: Coma Berenices
- HD 115404 A
- Right ascension: 13^{h} 16^{m} 51.05143^{s}
- Declination: +17° 01′ 01.8409″
- Apparent magnitude (V): 6.66
- HD 115404 B
- Right ascension: 13^{h} 16^{m} 51.55401^{s}
- Declination: +17° 00′ 59.8921″
- Apparent magnitude (V): 9.50

Characteristics

HD 115404 A
- Evolutionary stage: main sequence
- Spectral type: K2 V
- U−B color index: +0.623
- B−V color index: +0.917

HD 115404 B
- Evolutionary stage: main sequence
- Spectral type: M0.5 V
- B−V color index: +1.232

Astrometry

HD 115404 A
| Radial velocity (R_{v}) | 7.62 ± 0.09 km/s |
| Proper motion (μ) | RA: 636.285(28) mas/yr Dec.: −264.678(31) mas/yr |
| Parallax (π) | 91.0176±0.0236 mas |
| Distance | 35.834 ± 0.009 ly (10.987 ± 0.003 pc) |
| Absolute magnitude (M_{V}) | +6.3 |

HD 115404 B
| Radial velocity (R_{v}) | 5.95±0.13 km/s |
| Proper motion (μ) | RA: 649.666(31) mas/yr Dec.: −263.937(26) mas/yr |
| Parallax (π) | 90.9475±0.0232 mas |
| Distance | 35.862 ± 0.009 ly (10.995 ± 0.003 pc) |
| Absolute magnitude (M_{V}) | 10.1 |

Orbit
| Period (P) | 770.0 yr |
| Semi-major axis (a) | 8.06″ |
| Eccentricity (e) | 0.12 |
| Inclination (i) | 93.41° |
| Longitude of the node (Ω) | 104.66° |
| Periastron epoch (T) | B 1875.0 |
| Argument of periastron (ω) (secondary) | 276.99° |

Details

HD 115404 A
| Mass | 0.70±0.09 M_{☉} |
| Radius | 0.76±0.02 R_{☉} |
| Luminosity | 0.32 L_{☉} |
| Surface gravity (log g) | 4.58±0.03 cgs |
| Temperature | 4976 K |
| Metallicity [Fe/H] | −0.08 dex |
| Rotation | 18.2 days |
| Rotational velocity (v sin i) | 2.8 km/s |
| Age | 10.2 (5.4–13.5) Gyr |

HD 115404 B
| Mass | 0.542 M_{☉} |
| Radius | 0.550 R_{☉} |
| Luminosity | 0.043 L_{☉} |
| Surface gravity (log g) | 4.90 cgs |
| Temperature | 3,709 K |
| Rotational velocity (v sin i) | 9.6 km/s |
| Age | 3.0 Gyr |

Other designations
- BD+17°2611, GJ 505, HD 115404, HIP 64797, SAO 100491, LHS 2713

Database references
| SIMBAD | A |
- B
| Exoplanet Archive | data |
| ARICNS | A |
- B

HD 115404 is a binary star system located in the constellation Coma Berenices. Parallax measurements made by Hipparcos put the system at 36 light-years, or 11 parsecs, away. The combined apparent magnitude of the system is 6.52, with the magnitudes of the components being 6.66 and 9.50.

The primary component, designated A, is a K-type main sequence star. It is about 70% as massive as the Sun, and is 0.76 times as wide. Its companion is a red dwarf (M0.5 V). It has 54.2% the mass of the Sun, and is 0.55 times as wide. The two stars orbit each other every 770 years, and are separated by about 8″. The system is thought to be fairly old, at 5.4 to 13.5 billion years old.

In 2022, two exoplanets, Neptunian and super-Jovian in mass, were reported in orbit around the primary star using a combination of radial velocity and astrometry. However, a 2025 study using radial velocity observations failed to detect these planets.

The HD 115404 A planetary system
| Companion (in order from star) | Mass | Semimajor axis (AU) | Orbital period (days) | Eccentricity | Inclination (°) | Radius |
|---|---|---|---|---|---|---|
| b (disputed) | ≥0.097+0.020 −0.022 M_{J} | 0.088+0.003 −0.004 | 10.5+0.001 −0.002 | 0.232+0.197 −0.138 | — | — |
| c (disputed) | 10.319+1.473 −1.209 M_{J} | 11.364+3.301 −1.905 | 15319.2+7240.3 −3526.2 | 0.211+0.173 −0.102 | 25.791+1.842 −2.157° | — |
