= Gliese 146 =

K-type star in the constellation Horologium

Observation data Epoch J2000.0 Equinox ICRS
- Constellation: Horologium
- Right ascension: 03^{h} 35^{m} 00.93987^{s}
- Declination: −48° 25′ 08.9085″
- Apparent magnitude (V): 8.64

Characteristics
- Evolutionary stage: Main Sequence
- Spectral type: K6.5V
- U−B color index: +1.24
- B−V color index: +1.30
- Variable type: suspected, range 8.57 to 8.7 mag, NSV 1203

Astrometry
Radial velocity (R_{v})	+21.38±0.13 km/s
Proper motion (μ)	RA: 404.441 mas/yr Dec.: 307.498 mas/yr
Parallax (π)	73.5199±0.0164 mas
Distance	44.363 ± 0.010 ly (13.602 ± 0.003 pc)

Details
Mass	0.684±0.013 M_{☉}
Radius	0.674±0.020 R_{☉}
Luminosity	0.121 L_{☉}
Surface gravity (log g)	4.69±0.05 cgs
Temperature	4385±21 K
Metallicity [Fe/H]	-0.08±0.02 dex
Rotation	34.99^{+0.58}_{−0.53} days
Age	970 Myr

Other designations
- CD−48° 1011, GJ 146, HD 22496, HIP 16711, SAO 85397, LTT 1698, 2MASS J03350093-4825089

Database references
SIMBAD	data
ARICNS	data

Gliese 146 is a star with an orbiting exoplanet in the constellation Horologium. Gliese 146 is also catalogued as HD 22496, HIP 16711, SAO-216392, and LHS 1563. With an apparent visual magnitude of 8.64, it is too faint to be visible to the naked eye. Gliese 146 is located at a distance of 44.4 light years based on parallax measurements, and is drifting further away with a heliocentric radial velocity of +21 km/s.

This is an ordinary K-type main-sequence star with a stellar classification of K6.5V. It has 68% of the mass of the Sun and 67% of the Sun's girth. Gliese 146 is radiating 12% of the luminosity of the Sun from its photosphere at an effective temperature of 4,385 K. Classified as a suspected variable star, Gliese 146 was found to be a flare star, with average flare frequency 0.23 flares per day.

Its velocity relative to the Sun is 38.1 km/second, and its galactic orbit ranges between 20,800 and 25,400 light years from the center of the Galaxy, placing it within a thin disk. It belongs to the Hyades supercluster of stars, and is one of 155 K-type stars within 50 light years.

== Planetary system ==
It is one of 500 stars selected in 2009 for the SCUBA-2 All Sky Survey for stars with debris disks. The debris disk was not detected by any survey as in 2015 though.

In 2021, a Sub-Neptune planet HD 22496b was discovered utilizing a Doppler spectroscopy method. It is orbiting very close to the host star at a separation of 0.0510 AU (7.63 Gm) and an orbital period of five days. The planet is not known to be transiting. As the inclination of the orbital plane is unknown, only a rough lower bound on the mass of this planet can be established: it has at least ~5.6 times the mass of the Earth.

The HD 22496 planetary system
Companion (in order from star)	Mass	Semimajor axis (AU)	Orbital period (days)	Eccentricity	Inclination (°)	Radius
b	>5.57^{+0.73}_{−0.68}, <16 M_{🜨}	0.0510^{+0.0024}_{−0.0026}	5.09071 ± 0.00026	0	—	—

== See also ==
- Stars between 13 and 15 parsecs
- Habitability of K-type main-sequence star systems
