= 58 Eridani =

Star in the constellation Eridanus

- Location of 58 Eridani (circled in red)

Observation data Epoch J2000 Equinox ICRS
- Constellation: Eridanus
- Right ascension: 04^{h} 47^{m} 36.29170^{s}
- Declination: −16° 56′ 04.0405″
- Apparent magnitude (V): 5.47 - 5.51

Characteristics
- Evolutionary stage: main sequence
- Spectral type: G1.5 V CH-0.5
- U−B color index: +0.13
- B−V color index: +0.64
- Variable type: BY Dra

Astrometry
Radial velocity (R_{v})	21.60±0.12 km/s
Proper motion (μ)	RA: +130.264 mas/yr Dec.: +169.338 mas/yr
Parallax (π)	75.5289±0.0539 mas
Distance	43.18 ± 0.03 ly (13.240 ± 0.009 pc)
Absolute magnitude (M_{V})	4.87

Details
Mass	1.053±0.007 M_{☉}
Radius	1.00 R_{☉}
Luminosity	0.97±0.05 L_{☉}
Surface gravity (log g)	4.50±0.02 cgs
Temperature	5,820±5.7 K
Metallicity [Fe/H]	0.030±0.007 dex
Rotation	7.6 days
Rotational velocity (v sin i)	3.37±0.11 km/s
Age	600 Myr

Other designations
- 58 Eri, IX Eri, BD−17°954, GJ 177, HD 30495, HIP 22263, HR 1532, SAO 149888, LTT 2088

Database references
SIMBAD	data

58 Eridani is a main-sequence star in the constellation Eridanus. It is a solar analogue, having similar physical properties to the Sun. The star has a relatively high proper motion across the sky, and it is located 43 light years distant. It is a probable member of the IC 2391 moving group of stars that share a common motion through space.

== Characteristics ==
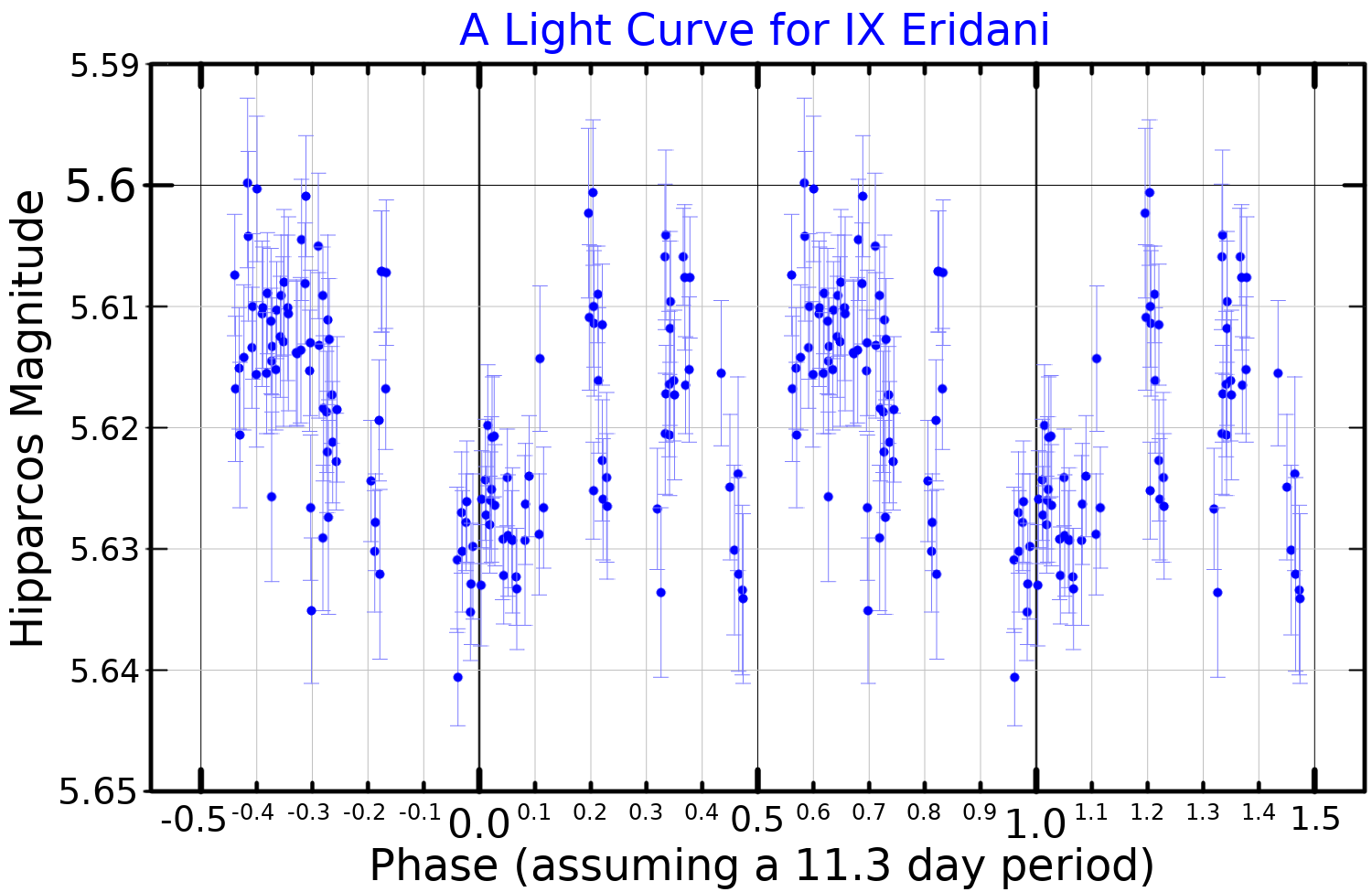
A light curve for IX Eridani, plotted from Hipparcos data

This is a BY Draconis variable with the designation IX Eridani, which ranges in magnitude from 5.47 down to 5.51 with a period of 11.3 days. The X-ray emissions from this star's corona indicate an age of less than a billion (10^{9}) years, compared to 4.6 billion for the Sun, so it is still relatively young for a star of its mass. Starspot activity has also been detected, which varies from year to year.

A circumstellar disc of dust particles has been detected in orbit around 58 Eridani.

== See also ==
- List of nearest bright stars
