= HD 176051 =

Spectroscopic binary star system in the constellation of Lyra

Observation data Epoch J2000 Equinox ICRS
- Constellation: Lyra
- Right ascension: 18^{h} 57^{m} 01.60985^{s}
- Declination: +32° 54′ 04.5723″
- Apparent magnitude (V): 5.20

Characteristics
- Spectral type: G0 V + K1 V
- U−B color index: +0.029
- B−V color index: +0.570

Astrometry
Radial velocity (R_{v})	−47.2 km/s
Proper motion (μ)	RA: +201.96 mas/yr Dec.: −145.46 mas/yr
Parallax (π)	67.24±0.37 mas
Distance	48.5 ± 0.3 ly (14.87 ± 0.08 pc)
Absolute magnitude (M_{V})	4.34

Orbit
Period (P)	61.4178±0.0633 years
Semi-major axis (a)	19.1 AU
Eccentricity (e)	0.262±0.003
Inclination (i)	114.2±0.2°
Longitude of the node (Ω)	48.3±0.2°
Periastron epoch (T)	1972.19±0.07
Argument of periastron (ω) (secondary)	281.6±0.3°
Semi-amplitude (K_{1}) (primary)	3.51 km/s
Semi-amplitude (K_{2}) (secondary)	0.74 km/s

Details

HD 176051 A
Mass	1.07 M_{☉}
Radius	1.06 R_{☉}
Luminosity	1.65 L_{☉}
Surface gravity (log g)	4.60 cgs
Temperature	6,000 K
Metallicity [Fe/H]	−0.11 dex
Age	8.1 Gyr

HD 176051 B
Mass	0.71 M_{☉}
Radius	0.81 R_{☉}

Other designations
- ADS 11871, HR 7162, BD+32°3267, GJ 738, HD 176051, LTT 15567, SAO 67612, HIP 93017

Database references
SIMBAD	AB
- A
- B
Exoplanet Archive	data
ARICNS	data
- data2
Extrasolar Planets; Encyclopaedia	data

HD 176051 is a spectroscopic binary star system approximately 49 light years away from Earth in the constellation Lyra. The pair orbit with a period of 22,423 days (61.4 years) and an eccentricity of 0.25. Compared to the Sun, they have a somewhat lower proportion of elements more massive than helium. Their individual masses are estimated at 1.07 and 0.71 solar masses (M_{☉}). The system is moving closer to the Sun with a radial velocity of −47 km/s and will reach perihelion in about 269,000 years when it comes within roughly 17 ly (5.1 pc) of the Sun.

== Planetary system ==
A planet orbiting one of the stars was discovered through astrometric observations. However, it is not known which stellar component the planet is orbiting around.

The HD 176051 planetary system
Companion (in order from star)	Mass	Semimajor axis (AU)	Orbital period (days)	Eccentricity	Inclination (°)	Radius
b	1.5 ± 0.3 M_{J}	1.76	1016 ± 40	0	—	—

The planet parameters are given here for the 0.71 M_{☉} component B. But, if instead the planet is orbiting the 1.07 M_{☉} component A, its mass is 2.26 M_{J} with a semimajor axis of 2.02 AU.

== See also ==
- List of star systems within 45–50 light-years
- Alpha Centauri
- Gamma Cephei
