= HD 166620 =

Star in the constellation Hercules

- Location of HD 166620 (circled in red)

Observation data Epoch J2000 Equinox ICRS
- Constellation: Hercules
- Right ascension: 18^{h} 09^{m} 37.41621^{s}
- Declination: +38° 27′ 27.9980″
- Apparent magnitude (V): 6.40

Characteristics
- Spectral type: K2 V
- U−B color index: +0.585
- B−V color index: +0.875

Astrometry
Radial velocity (R_{v})	−19.51±0.12 km/s
Proper motion (μ)	RA: −316.454 mas/yr Dec.: −468.348 mas/yr
Parallax (π)	90.1234±0.0156 mas
Distance	36.190 ± 0.006 ly (11.096 ± 0.002 pc)
Absolute magnitude (M_{V})	6.17

Details
Mass	0.76+0.032 −0.019 M_{☉}
Radius	0.77+0.007 −0.006 R_{☉}
Luminosity	0.36+0.02 −0.01 L_{☉}
Surface gravity (log g)	4.55+0.02 −0.01 cgs
Temperature	4,989±48 K
Metallicity [Fe/H]	−0.21±0.04 dex
Rotation	42.4 d
Rotational velocity (v sin i)	<2.0 km/s
Age	10.09+2.73 −3.76 Gyr

Other designations
- BD+38°3095, GJ 706, HD 166620, HIP 88972, HR 6806, SAO 66700, LHS 3363

Database references
SIMBAD	data

HD 166620 or HR 6806 is a solitary, orange, main sequence, and Sun-like (K2 V) star located thirty-six light-years away, in the constellation Hercules. The star is smaller than the Sun, with around 79% of the solar mass and radius, and 35% of the solar luminosity. It appears to be rotating slowly with an estimated period of 42 days. In 1988, it was noticed that the star had an inactive chromosphere, with a surface magnetic field strength of only 1,500 G. From 1990 activity in the chromosphere increased, in line with a 16-year stellar cycle previously observed. But, sometime after 1994 (exact date unknown because of a data collection gap between 1995 and 2004) chromospheric activity greatly reduced, and has stayed flat for more than 16 years. As of 2022, the star appears to have entered the equivalent of a Maunder minimum. The star is around six billion years of age.

There was suspected to be a nearby very cool, and very dim, T9 to Y brown dwarf companion, WISE J180901.07+383805.4, at an angular separation of 769″, which would have corresponded to a projected separation of 8460 AU at the distance of HD 166620. However, with further observation it was found to be bluer than at first thought and more typical of a slightly brighter T7 dwarf, which would place it at a much greater distance of 91 ly (28 pc)—ruling out a physical association. This is confirmed by the differing proper motion of the star and this object.

This star has been targeted by planet searches using the radial velocity method, but as of 2023 no evidence of a planetary companion has been found. Observations rule out the existence of planets down to super-Earth masses with orbital periods less than 2,800 days; at periods less than 10 days, planets less massive than Earth would be detectable.
