= HD 154577 =

Star in the constellation Ara

Observation data Epoch J2000 Equinox J2000
- Constellation: Ara
- Right ascension: 17^{h} 10^{m} 10.35091^{s}
- Declination: −60° 43′ 43.5757″
- Apparent magnitude (V): 7.385

Characteristics
- Spectral type: K2.5Vk:
- U−B color index: +0.53
- B−V color index: +0.89

Astrometry
Radial velocity (R_{v})	+8.8 km/s
Proper motion (μ)	RA: 70.96 mas/yr Dec.: 589.86 mas/yr
Parallax (π)	73.41±0.70 mas
Distance	44.4 ± 0.4 ly (13.6 ± 0.1 pc)
Absolute magnitude (M_{V})	6.71

Details
Mass	0.68 M_{☉}
Radius	0.68 R_{☉}
Luminosity	0.24 L_{☉}
Surface gravity (log g)	4.70 cgs
Temperature	4,850 K
Metallicity [Fe/H]	−0.70 dex
Rotational velocity (v sin i)	0.2 km/s
Age	3.2 Gyr

Other designations
- CD−60 6576, GCTP, GJ 656, HD 154577, HIP 83990, LHS 3268, LTT 6833, SAO 253819

Database references
SIMBAD	data
ARICNS	data

HD 154577 (Gliese 656) is a K-type main-sequence star in the southern constellation of Ara. It is a high proper motion star and, based upon an annual parallax shift of 73.41 mas, is located about 44 light years from the Sun. The star is too faint to be readily visible to the naked eye, having an apparent visual magnitude of 7.4. It is moving away from the Sun with a radial velocity of +9 km/s.

This star has only 68% of the Sun's mass and radius, an effective temperature of 4,850 K and a stellar classification of K2.5Vk:, which indicates it is a K-type main sequence star. (The 'k' suffix indicates there are interstellar absorption features in the spectra, while ':' means there is some uncertainty about the classification.) It is about 3.2 billion years old and appears to be spinning slowly with a projected rotational velocity of 0.2 km/s. The star is radiating 24% of the Sun's luminosity from its photosphere at an effective temperature of 4,850 K.

As of 2005, this star is not known to host any planets. No excess of infrared radiation has been detected of the type that would indicate the presence of an orbiting debris disk.
