= 111 Tauri =

Wide binary star system in the constellation Taurus

- Location of 111 Tauri (circled)

Observation data Epoch J2000 Equinox ICRS
- Constellation: Taurus
- A
- Right ascension: 05^{h} 24^{m} 25.46328^{s}
- Declination: +17° 23′ 00.7264″
- Apparent magnitude (V): 5.0
- B
- Right ascension: 05^{h} 23^{m} 38.37950^{s}
- Declination: +17° 19′ 26.8209″
- Apparent magnitude (V): 7.9

Characteristics

A
- Evolutionary stage: main sequence
- Spectral type: F8 V
- U−B color index: −0.05
- B−V color index: 0.544
- Variable type: BY Dra

B
- Evolutionary stage: main sequence
- Spectral type: K5 V

Astrometry

A
Radial velocity (R_{v})	+37.8 km/s
Proper motion (μ)	RA: +250.585 mas/yr Dec.: −7.156 mas/yr
Parallax (π)	68.5908±0.1040 mas
Distance	47.55 ± 0.07 ly (14.58 ± 0.02 pc)
Absolute magnitude (M_{V})	3.49±0.06

B
Radial velocity (R_{v})	38.03±0.12 km/s
Proper motion (μ)	RA: +250.984 mas/yr Dec.: −5.707 mas/yr
Parallax (π)	68.7662±0.0246 mas
Distance	47.43 ± 0.02 ly (14.542 ± 0.005 pc)
Absolute magnitude (M_{V})	+7.2

Details

111 Tau A
Mass	1.08 M_{☉}
Radius	1.67±0.06 R_{☉}
Luminosity	1.845 L_{☉}
Surface gravity (log g)	4.24 cgs
Temperature	6,015 K
Metallicity [Fe/H]	−0.14 dex
Rotation	3.503±0.006 d
Rotational velocity (v sin i)	16.0 km/s
Age	20–50 Myr

111 Tau B
Mass	0.72 M_{☉}
Radius	0.70 R_{☉}
Luminosity	0.20 L_{☉}
Surface gravity (log g)	4.43 cgs
Temperature	4,757 K
Metallicity [Fe/H]	−0.01 dex
Rotation	9.6 days
Rotational velocity (v sin i)	4.3 km/s
Age	445 Myr

Other designations
- 111 Tau
- 111 Tau A: Gl 202, HR 1780, BD+17°920, HD 35296, SAO 94526, HIP 25278, V1119 Tau
- 111 Tau B: Gl 201, BD+17°917, HD 35171, SAO 94513, HIP 25220

Database references
SIMBAD	A
- B

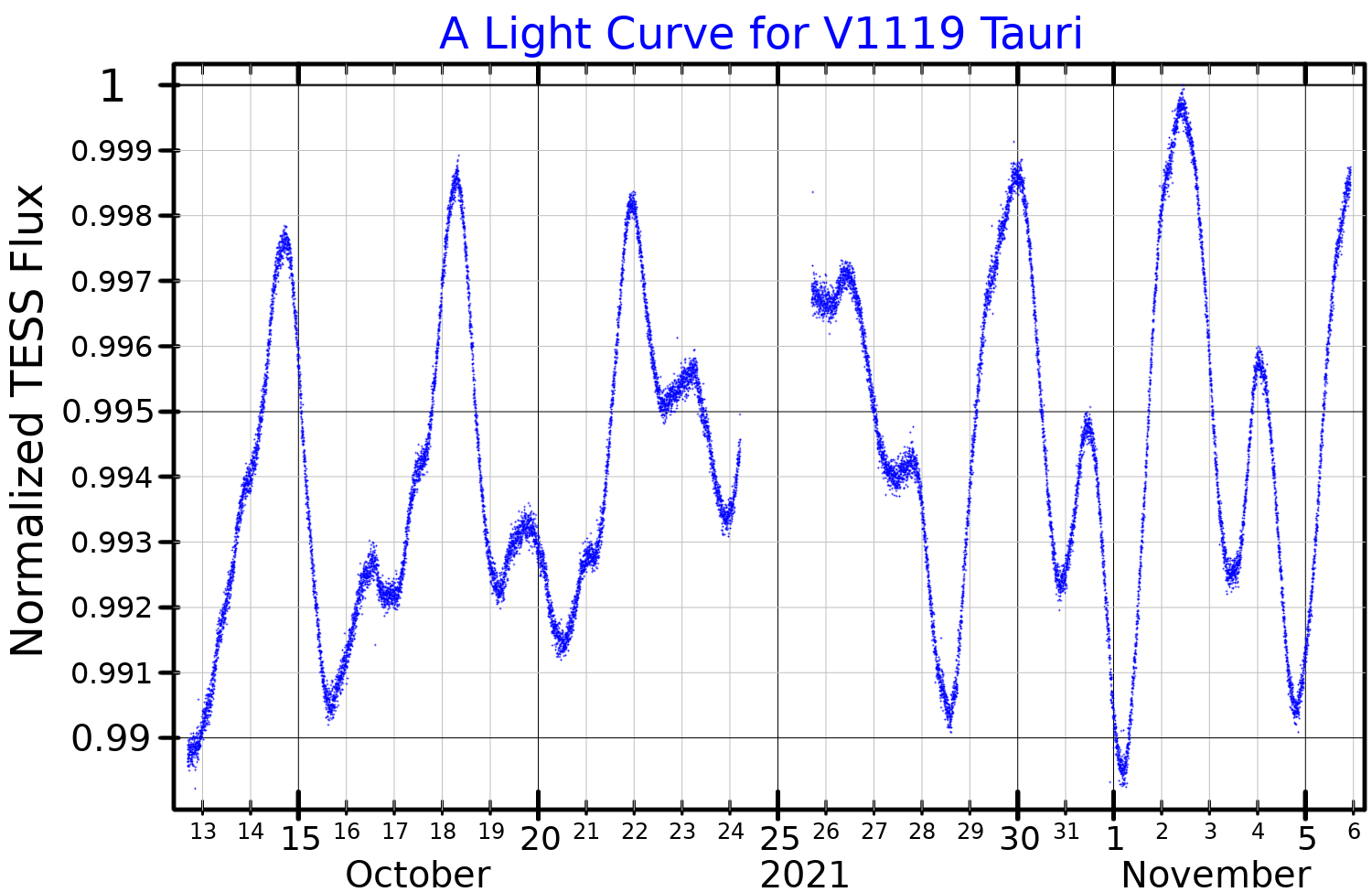
A light curve for V1119 Tauri, plotted from TESS data

111 Tauri is a wide binary star system in the constellation Taurus. It is located at a distance of 48 light years from the Sun. Primary component A is a main sequence star with a stellar classification of F8V. The secondary component B (Gliese 201) is a K-type main sequence star. The primary is larger and more luminous than the Sun, with about 130% of the Sun's radius and 185% of the Sun's luminosity. The apparent magnitude of 5.0 indicates it is a faint star that can be viewed by the naked eye under good, dark-sky conditions.

The metallicity of the primary star, which measures the proportion of elements other than hydrogen and helium, is similar to the Sun. Estimates of [Fe/H], which is the logarithm of the ratio of iron to hydrogen as compared to the Sun, range from a low of −0.14 to a high of 0.05. This star shows an unusually high content of lithium, which remains unexplained. Age estimates for this star range from 3.6 to 3.76 billion years. however the most recent age determination indicates a very young star with an age of 20 to 50 million years. It is a prominent X-ray source.

This star is rotating relatively rapidly, completing a rotation along the equator every 3.5 days as compared to 25 days for the Sun. It is also undergoing differential rotation in which the rotation velocity varies by latitude. In 1996, Kazimierz Stępień and Edward H. Geyer announced that 111 Tauri is a variable star. It is a BY Draconis variable, and was given the variable star designation V1119 Tauri, in 1997.

This star was examined for an excess of infrared emission that could indicate it has a circumstellar debris disk of dust, but no significant excess was observed. The space velocity components of this star are [U, V, W] = [−36.94, −14.63, 7.63] km/s. It is a member of the Hyades stellar kinematic group of co-moving stars.
