= HD 14412 =

Star in the constellation Fornax

- Location of HD 14412 (circled in red)

Observation data Epoch J2000 Equinox ICRS
- Constellation: Fornax
- Right ascension: 02^{h} 18^{m} 58.50469^{s}
- Declination: −25° 56′ 44.4735″
- Apparent magnitude (V): 6.33

Characteristics
- Spectral type: G8V
- U−B color index: +0.20
- B−V color index: +0.71

Astrometry
| Radial velocity (R_{v}) | +7.459±0.0040 km/s |
| Proper motion (μ) | RA: −217.662 mas/yr Dec.: +444.584 mas/yr |
| Parallax (π) | 77.9153±0.0602 mas |
| Distance | 41.86 ± 0.03 ly (12.834 ± 0.010 pc) |
| Absolute magnitude (M_{V}) | 5.83 |

Details
| Mass | 0.821 M_{☉} |
| Radius | 0.74+0.01 −0.03 R_{☉} |
| Luminosity | 0.443 L_{☉} |
| Surface gravity (log g) | 4.59 cgs |
| Temperature | 5,482+104 −50 K |
| Metallicity [Fe/H] | −0.46 dex |
| Rotational velocity (v sin i) | 3.26 km/s |
| Age | 9.61 Gyr |

Other designations
- 22 G. Fornacis, CD−26°828, GJ 95, HD 14412, HIP 10798, HR 683, SAO 167697, LHS 1387, LTT 1178

Database references
| SIMBAD | data |

HD 14412 is a single star in the southern constellation of Fornax. It has the Gould designation 22 G. Fornacis, while HD 14412 is the Henry Draper Catalogue designation. The star has an apparent visual magnitude of 6.33, which, according to the Bortle scale, can be dimly seen with the naked eye from rural locations. Based upon an annual parallax shift of 77.9″, this system is 42 light-years distant from the Sun. It is drifting further away with a radial velocity of +7.5 km/s.

This star has a stellar classification of G8V, indicating that it is a main-sequence star. Based upon stellar models, it has 82% of the Sun's mass and 77% of the radius. HD 14412 is spinning with a projected rotational velocity of 3.26 km/s and is about 9.61 billion years old. It is radiating 44% of the luminosity of the Sun from its photosphere at an effective temperature of 5,482 K, giving it the yellow-hued glow of a G-type star.

HD 14412 has been examined for signs of an orbiting debris disk or a planetary companion, but as of 2012 none has been discovered.
