= 12 Ophiuchi =

Star in the constellation Ophiuchus

- Location of 12 Ophiuchi (circled in red)

Observation data Epoch J2000 Equinox ICRS
- Constellation: Ophiuchus
- Right ascension: 16^{h} 36^{m} 21.44969^{s}
- Declination: −02° 19′ 28.5130″
- Apparent magnitude (V): 5.77

Characteristics
- Spectral type: K1 V
- U−B color index: +0.50
- B−V color index: +.82
- Variable type: BY Draconis

Astrometry
Radial velocity (R_{v})	−13.11±0.12 km/s
Proper motion (μ)	RA: +456.058 mas/yr Dec.: −309.224 mas/yr
Parallax (π)	101.0719±0.0501 mas
Distance	32.27 ± 0.02 ly (9.894 ± 0.005 pc)
Absolute magnitude (M_{V})	5.57 ± 0.05

Details
Mass	0.910±0.007 M_{☉}
Radius	0.770±0.012 R_{☉}
Luminosity	0.457±0.008 L_{☉}
Surface gravity (log g)	4.62±0.02 cgs
Temperature	5,248±10 K
Metallicity	102% Sun
Metallicity [Fe/H]	+0.03±0.01 dex
Rotation	21.3 days
Rotational velocity (v sin i)	2.4±1.0 km/s
Age	1.0–1.9 Gyr

Other designations
- 12 Oph, V2133 Oph, BD−01 3220, BD−02 4211, FK5 1433, GJ 631, HD 149661, HIP 81300, HR 6171, SAO 141269, LHS 3224, LTT 6632, PLX 3773

Database references
SIMBAD	data
ARICNS	data

12 Ophiuchi is a variable star 32.3 light-years away in the constellation Ophiuchus. No companions have yet been detected in orbit around this star, and it remains uncertain whether or not it possesses a dust ring.

This star is categorized as a BY Draconis variable, with variable star designation V2133. The variability is attributed to large-scale magnetic activity on the chromosphere (in the form of starspots) combined with a rotational period that moved the active regions into (and out of) the line of sight. This results in low amplitude variability of 12 Ophiuchi's luminosity. The star also appears to display rapid variation in luminosity, possibly due to changes in the starspots. Measurements of the long-term variability show two overlapping cycles of starspot activity (compared to the Sun's single, 11-year cycle.) The periods of these two cycles are 4.0 and 17.4 years.

This star was among the top 100 target stars for NASA's canceled Terrestrial Planet Finder mission.

Its abundance of heavy elements (elements heavier than helium) is nearly identical to that of the Sun. The surface gravity is equal to $\log(g) = 4.6$, which is somewhat higher than the Sun's. The space velocity is 30 km/s relative to the Solar System. The high rotation period and active chromosphere are indicative of a relatively young star.
