= HD 196761 =

G-type main sequence star in the constellation Capricornus

Observation data Epoch J2000 Equinox ICRS
- Constellation: Capricornus
- Right ascension: 20^{h} 40^{m} 11.75511^{s}
- Declination: −23° 46′ 25.9186″
- Apparent magnitude (V): 6.37

Characteristics
- Evolutionary stage: main sequence
- Spectral type: G8V
- U−B color index: 1.393
- B−V color index: 0.719

Astrometry
Radial velocity (R_{v})	–45.3 km/s
Proper motion (μ)	RA: +499.697 mas/yr Dec.: +461.374 mas/yr
Parallax (π)	68.1557±0.0.0300 mas
Distance	48 ± 0 ly (15 ± 0 pc)
Absolute magnitude (M_{V})	5.58

Details
Mass	0.81 ± 0.03 M_{☉}
Radius	0.88 R_{☉}
Luminosity	0.525 L_{☉}
Surface gravity (log g)	4.54 cgs
Temperature	5,457 K
Metallicity [Fe/H]	-0.30 dex
Rotation	32 days
Rotational velocity (v sin i)	3.50 km/s
Age	5.63 Gyr

Other designations
- CD−24°16193, GJ 796, HD 196761, HIP 101997, HR 7898, LTT 8172, SAO 189549

Database references
SIMBAD	data

HD 196761 is the Henry Draper Catalogue designation for a G-type main-sequence star in the constellation Capricornus. With an apparent magnitude of 6.37 it is near the limit of what can be seen with the naked eye, but according to the Bortle Scale it may be possible to view it at night from rural skies. Based upon parallax measurements by the Hipparcos spacecraft, it is located about 47 light years from the Solar System.

It has a stellar classification of G8V with about 88% of the radius of the Sun and 81% of the Sun's mass. Compared to the Sun, this star has about half the proportion of elements other than hydrogen and helium. The projected rotational velocity of the star's equator is a relatively leisurely 3.50 km/s. This star has been examined for an infrared excess that could indicate the presence of a circumstellar disk of dust, but as of 2015 none has been detected.

The space velocity components of this star are U = −59, V = 20 and W = 4 km/s. It is presently following an orbit through the Milky Way that has an eccentricity of 0.18, bringing it as close as 24.27 kly (7.44 kpc) and as distant as 34.6 kly (10.6 kpc) from the Galactic Center. The inclination of this orbit will carry HD 196761 no more than 0.65 kly (0.20 kpc) from the plane of the galactic disk.
