= HR 5256 =

Star in the constellation Ursa Major

- Location of HR 5256 (circled in red)

Observation data Epoch J2000 Equinox ICRS
- Constellation: Ursa Major
- Right ascension: 13^{h} 57^{m} 32.05836^{s}
- Declination: +61° 29′ 34.3000″
- Apparent magnitude (V): 6.52

Characteristics
- Spectral type: K3 V
- U−B color index: 0.98
- B−V color index: 1.01

Astrometry
Radial velocity (R_{v})	−26.376±0.0011 km/s
Proper motion (μ)	RA: −31.693(22) mas/yr Dec.: +216.290(21) mas/yr
Parallax (π)	99.3325±0.0193 mas
Distance	32.835 ± 0.006 ly (10.067 ± 0.002 pc)
Absolute magnitude (M_{V})	6.51

Details
Mass	0.82 M_{☉}
Radius	0.78 R_{☉}
Luminosity	0.28 L_{☉}
Surface gravity (log g)	4.57 cgs
Temperature	4,811 K
Metallicity [Fe/H]	0.17 dex
Rotational velocity (v sin i)	4.6 km/s
Age	5.36 Gyr

Other designations
- BD+62°1325, HD 122064, HIP 68184, HR 5256, SAO 16230, G 239-008, LTT 14084

Database references
SIMBAD	data

HR 5256 is a star located 32.869 light-years away from the Sun in the northern circumpolar constellation of Ursa Major. It has an orange hue and is a challenge to view with the naked eye, having an apparent visual magnitude of 6.52. The distance to this star is just over 10 parsecs, so the absolute magnitude of 6.51 is almost the same as the star's apparent magnitude. HR 5256 is drifting nearer to the Sun with a radial velocity of −26.4 km/s, and will make its closest approach to the Sun in about 333,000±16,000 years, when it will be at a distance of 12.72 ± 0.65 light-years.

This object is an ordinary K-type main-sequence star with a stellar classification of K3 V, which indicates it is undergoing core hydrogen fusion. It is over five billion years of age and is spinning slowly with a projected rotational velocity of 4.6 km/s. The star has an estimated 82% of the Sun's mass and 78% of the Sun's radius. It is radiating just 28% of the luminosity of the Sun from its photosphere at an effective temperature of 4,811 K.
