= HD 170657 =

Star in the constellation Sagittarius

Observation data Epoch J2000 Equinox ICRS
- Constellation: Sagittarius
- Right ascension: 18^{h} 31^{m} 18.96122^{s}
- Declination: –18° 54′ 31.7326″
- Apparent magnitude (V): 6.81

Characteristics
- Evolutionary stage: Main sequence
- Spectral type: K2V
- U−B color index: +0.56
- B−V color index: +0.861±0.007
- Variable type: Suspected

Astrometry
| Radial velocity (R_{v}) | −43.16±0.14 km/s |
| Proper motion (μ) | RA: –138.402 mas/yr Dec.: –195.274 mas/yr |
| Parallax (π) | 75.9773±0.0458 mas |
| Distance | 42.93 ± 0.03 ly (13.162 ± 0.008 pc) |
| Absolute magnitude (M_{V}) | 6.20 |

Details
| Mass | 0.79±0.11 M_{☉} |
| Radius | 0.75+0.01 −0.04 R_{☉} |
| Luminosity | 0.336±0.001 L_{☉} |
| Surface gravity (log g) | 4.59 cgs |
| Temperature | 5,133±37 K |
| Metallicity [Fe/H] | –0.15 dex |
| Rotational velocity (v sin i) | 4.2 km/s |
| Age | 7.95 Gyr |

Other designations
- NSV 10944, GJ 716, HD 170657, HIP 90790, SAO 161557, WDS J18313-1855A, LTT 7358

Database references
| SIMBAD | data |
| ARICNS | data |

HD 170657 is a star in the southern constellation Sagittarius. It is a suspected variable star that has been measured ranging in apparent visual magnitude from 6.82 down to 6.88, which is dim enough to be a challenge to view with the naked eye even under ideal conditions. The star is located at a distance of 43 light years from the Sun based on parallax. It is drifting closer with a radial velocity of −43 km/s, and is predicted to come as close as 14.0 light-years in around 266,200 years. The space velocity components of this star are (U, V, W) = (–41, –26, +6) km/s.

This is a K-type main-sequence star with a stellar classification of K2V, which indicates that, much like the Sun, it is generating energy at its core using hydrogen fusion. The star has 79% of the mass of the Sun and 75% of the Sun's radius. It is nearly eight billion years old and is spinning with a projected rotational velocity of 4.2 The star is radiating 33.6% of the luminosity of the Sun from its photosphere at an effective temperature of 5,133 K. When observed with the Spitzer Space Telescope, this star did not display an excess emission of infrared radiation, which may otherwise indicate the presence of an orbiting debris disk.
