= 36 Ursae Majoris =

Double star in the constellation Ursa Major

- Location of 36 Ursae Majoris (circled in red)

Observation data Epoch J2000.0 Equinox ICRS
- Constellation: Ursa Major
- A
- Right ascension: 10^{h} 30^{m} 37.5793^{s}
- Declination: +55° 58′ 49.940″
- Apparent magnitude (V): 4.82
- B
- Right ascension: 10^{h} 30^{m} 25.3089^{s}
- Declination: +55° 59′ 56.855″
- Apparent magnitude (V): 8.86

Characteristics

A
- Evolutionary stage: main sequence
- Spectral type: F8 V
- U−B color index: −0.01
- B−V color index: +0.52

B
- Evolutionary stage: main sequence
- Spectral type: K7Ve
- B−V color index: +1.34

Astrometry

A
Radial velocity (R_{v})	+8.57 km/s
Proper motion (μ)	RA: −177.045 mas/yr Dec.: −32.634 mas/yr
Parallax (π)	77.2485±0.0805 mas
Distance	42.22 ± 0.04 ly (12.95 ± 0.01 pc)
Absolute magnitude (M_{V})	4.29

B
Radial velocity (R_{v})	+8.67 km/s
Proper motion (μ)	RA: −182.443 mas/yr Dec.: −32.034 mas/yr
Parallax (π)	77.4072±0.0182 mas
Distance	42.135 ± 0.010 ly (12.919 ± 0.003 pc)
Absolute magnitude (M_{V})	8.2

Details

A
Mass	1.10 M_{☉}
Radius	1.17 R_{☉}
Luminosity	1.69 L_{☉}
Surface gravity (log g)	4.23 cgs
Temperature	6,066 K
Metallicity [Fe/H]	−0.09 dex
Rotational velocity (v sin i)	1.50 km/s
Age	4.0 Gyr

B
Mass	0.626 M_{☉}
Radius	0.648 R_{☉}
Luminosity	0.10 L_{☉}
Surface gravity (log g)	4.61 cgs
Temperature	4,132 K
Metallicity [Fe/H]	−0.08 dex
Rotational velocity (v sin i)	9 km/s
Age	1.0 Gyr

Other designations
- 36 UMa, WDS J10306+5559
- A: BD+56°1459, FK5 394, GJ 395, HD 90839, HIP 51459, HR 4112, SAO 27670
- B: BD+56°1458, GJ 394, HD 237903, SAO 27668

Database references
SIMBAD	A
- B

36 Ursae Majoris is a double star in the northern constellation of Ursa Major. With an apparent visual magnitude of 4.8, it can be seen with the naked eye in suitable dark skies. Based upon parallax measurements, this binary lies at a distance of 42 light-years (13 parsecs) from Earth.

The brighter star of the two is a solar analog—meaning it has physical properties that make it similar to the Sun. It has 10% more mass and a radius 17% larger than the Sun, with an estimated age of four billion years. The spectrum of this star matches a stellar classification of F8 V, which indicates this is a main sequence star that is generating energy at its core through the nuclear fusion of hydrogen. The energy is being radiated into space from its outer envelope at an effective temperature of 6,066 K. This gives the star the characteristic yellow-white hue of an F-type star.

The fainter of the two stars has an apparent magnitude 8.86 and shares a common proper motion. Its spectral type of K7Ve indicates it is a red dwarf. It has a mass 60% of the Sun's, a temperature of 4,132 K and a bolometric luminosity only 10% of the Sun's.

36 Ursae Majoris has a second companion with a magnitude of 11.44 located at an angular separation of 240.6″ along a position angle of 292°, as of 2004. It does not share the proper motion of the other two stars and is a more massive and luminous star but much further away.

== Hunt for substellar objects ==
According to Nelson & Angel (1998), 36 Ursae Majoris could host one or two (or at least three) jovian planets (or even brown dwarfs) at wide separations from the host star, with orbital periods of 10–15, 25 and 50 years respectively. The authors have set upper limits of 1.1–2, 5.3 and 24 Jupiter masses for the putative planetary objects. Also Lippincott (1983) had previously noticed the possible presence of a massive unseen companion (with nearly 70 times the mass of Jupiter, just below the stellar regime, thus a brown dwarf). Putative parameters for the substellar object show an orbital period of 18 years and quite a high eccentricity (e=0.8). Even Campbell et al. 1988 inferred the existence of planetary objects or even brown dwarfs less massive than 14 Jupiter masses around 36 Ursae Majoris.

Nevertheless, no certain planetary companion has yet been detected or confirmed. The McDonald Observatory team has set limits to the presence of one or more planets with masses between 0.13 and 2.5 Jupiter masses and average separations spanning between 0.05 and 5.2 AU.

An infrared excess has been detected around this star, most likely indicating the presence of a circumstellar disk at a radius of 38.6 AU. The temperature of this dust is 50 K.
