= HD 211415 =

Binary star system in the constellation Grus

Observation data Epoch J2000 Equinox ICRS
- Constellation: Grus
- Right ascension: 22^{h} 18^{m} 15.6134^{s}
- Declination: −53° 37′ 37.467″
- Apparent magnitude (V): 5.40 + 9.70

Characteristics
- Evolutionary stage: main sequence
- Spectral type: G0V + MV
- U−B color index: +0.06
- B−V color index: +0.61

Astrometry
Radial velocity (R_{v})	−12.68±0.17 km/s
Proper motion (μ)	RA: +441.230 mas/yr Dec.: −629.750 mas/yr
Parallax (π)	71.0938±0.0554 mas
Distance	45.88 ± 0.04 ly (14.07 ± 0.01 pc)
Absolute magnitude (M_{V})	4.69

Orbit
Period (P)	218+17 −14 yr
Semi-major axis (a)	42.3+2.3 −2.0 AU
Eccentricity (e)	0.775+0.057 −0.071
Inclination (i)	75.8+1.8 −2.2°

Details

HD 211415 A
Mass	1.080±0.054 M_{☉}
Radius	1.048±0.040 R_{☉}
Luminosity	1.16±0.03 L_{☉}
Surface gravity (log g)	4.38±0.02 cgs
Temperature	5,871±5 K
Metallicity [Fe/H]	−0.230±0.004 dex
Rotational velocity (v sin i)	0.32 km/s
Age	6.50+0.50 −0.31 Gyr

HD 211415 B
Mass	0.511+0.034 −0.030 M_{☉}

Other designations
- CD−54°9222, GCTP 5395.00, GJ 853 A, HD 211415, HIP 110109, HR 8501, LHS 3790, LFT 1702, LTT 8943, SAO 247400.

Database references
SIMBAD	data

HD 211415 is a double star in the constellation Grus. With an apparent visual magnitude of 5.33, it is visible to the naked eye. The annual parallax shift is 71.09 mas, which yields a distance measurement of 45.88 light years. It has a relatively high proper motion, traversing the celestial sphere at the rate of 769 mas per year, and is moving closer to the Sun with a radial velocity of −13 km/s.

The two members of this system take about 220 years to complete an orbit around each other, and are separated about a semi-major axis of 42.3 AU, although the very high orbital eccentricity of 0.775 mean this value is highly variable.

HD 211415 was identified in September 2003 by astrobiologist Margaret Turnbull from the University of Arizona in Tucson as one of the most promising nearby candidates for hosting life based on her analysis of the HabCat list of stars. It is a G-type main-sequence star with a stellar classification of G0 V, and has 6.5 billion years of age.
