= HR 7578 =

Triple star system in the constellation Sagittarius

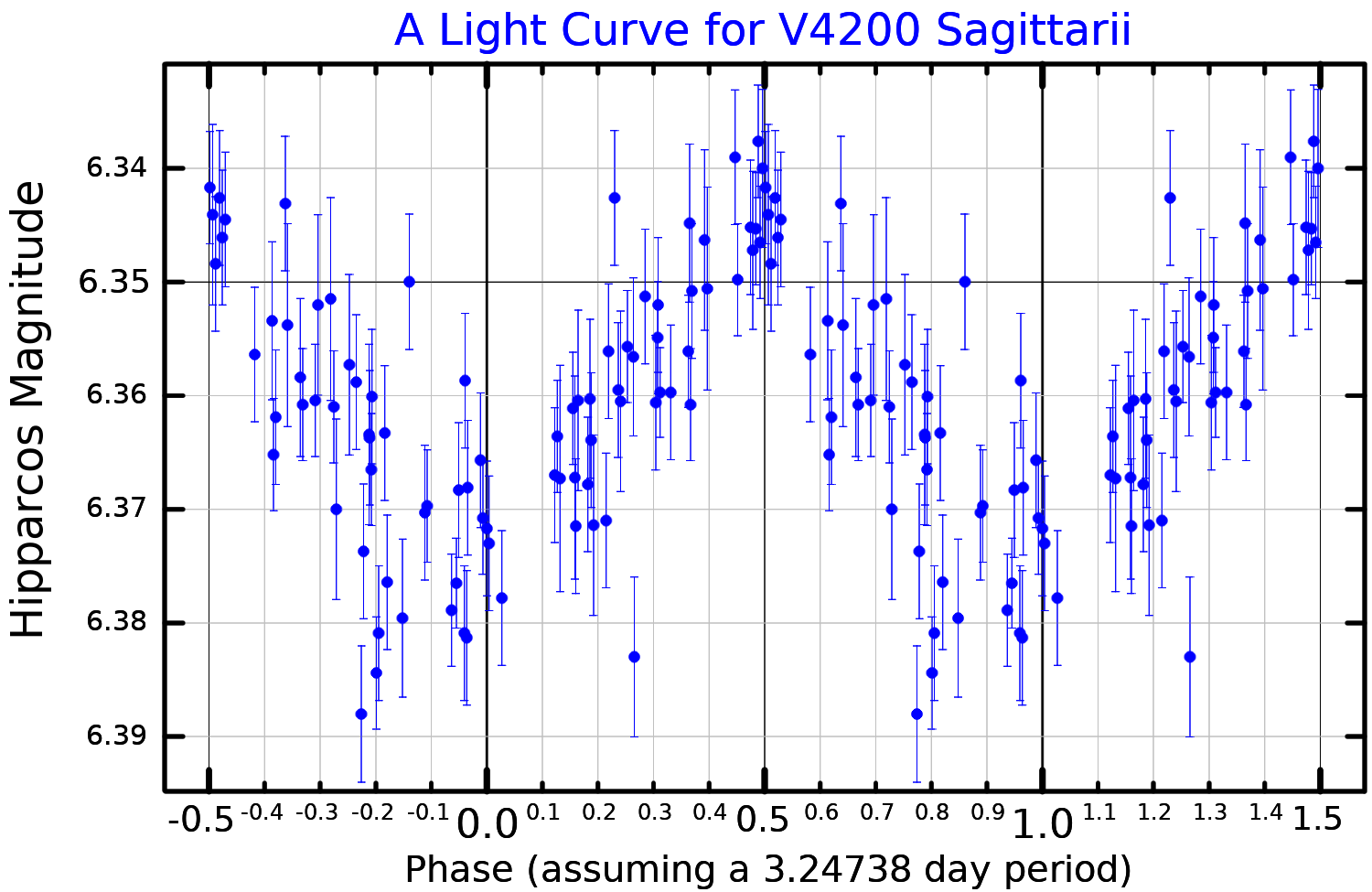
- A light curve for V4200 Sagittarii, plotted from Hipparcos data

Observation data Epoch J2000 Equinox ICRS
- Constellation: Sagittarius
- A
- Right ascension: 19^{h} 54^{m} 17.7453^{s}
- Declination: −23° 56′ 27.863″
- Apparent magnitude (V): 6.18

Characteristics

A
- Spectral type: K3 V + K3 V + M5
- U−B color index: +0.915
- B−V color index: +1.045
- Variable type: BY Dra

Astrometry

A
Radial velocity (R_{v})	−5.1±0.2 km/s
Proper motion (μ)	RA: −124.476±0.067 mas/yr Dec.: −410.440±0.043 mas/yr
Parallax (π)	70.857±0.019 mas
Distance	46.03 ± 0.01 ly (14.113 ± 0.004 pc)
Absolute magnitude (M_{V})	+5.48

Orbit
Primary	HR 7578 Aa
Name	HR 7578 Ab
Period (P)	46.81614±0.00003 d
Semi-major axis (a)	0.3054±0.0001 AU
Eccentricity (e)	0.68664±0.00006
Inclination (i)	99.048±0.007°
Longitude of the node (Ω)	111.83±0.01°
Periastron epoch (T)	2455441.0406±0.0003 HJD
Argument of periastron (ω) (secondary)	241.056±0.011°
Semi-amplitude (K_{1}) (primary)	47.79±0.01 km/s
Semi-amplitude (K_{2}) (secondary)	48.63±0.01 km/s

Details

HR 7578 Aa
Mass	0.87492±0.00032 M_{☉}
Radius	0.86±0.04 R_{☉}
Luminosity	0.35±0.02 L_{☉}
Temperature	4,820±200 K
Metallicity [Fe/H]	0.28 dex
Rotational velocity (v sin i)	2.0 km/s

HR 7578 Ab
Mass	0.85978±0.00029 M_{☉}
Radius	0.81±0.04 R_{☉}
Luminosity	0.31±0.02 L_{☉}
Temperature	4,820±200 K

2MASS J19542064−2356398 (HR 7578 C)
Mass	0.173±0.020 M_{☉}
Radius	0.204±0.004 R_{☉}
Luminosity	0.00304±0.00083 L_{☉}
Surface gravity (log g)	5.0570±0.0244 cgs
Temperature	3,002±157 K

Other designations
- CD−24°15668, GJ 770, HD 188088, HIP 97944, HR 7578, SAO 188692

Database references
SIMBAD	data
ARICNS	data

HR 7578 (also known as V4200 Sagittarii) is a triple star system in the constellation of Sagittarius. Their combined apparent magnitude is 6.18, making it very faintly visible to the naked eye of an observer under a dark sky, far from any city. Parallax measurements by the Gaia spacecraft put the system at 46 light-years (14.1 parsecs) away, making this a nearby system.

The two main stars of HR 7578 are fairly old, older than the Pleiades but possibly younger than the Hyades. The stars are between 5×10^{8} and 2×10^{9} years old. Both are K-type main-sequence stars. Both stars have a minimum mass of 0.85 ± 0.03 M_{☉}, and are unusually metal-rich, showing high amounts of cyanide and sodium in their spectra.

In 1982, Francis C. Fekel and Willet I. Beavers suggested that HR 7578 might be a variable star, based on their spectroscopic observations. James T. Hooten and Douglas S. Hall confirmed that the star's brightness varies, in 1990. It was given its variable star designation, V4200 Sagittarii, in 1993. HR 7578 is a BY Draconis variable. This is a class of variable star whose variability comes from starspots on the stars' surfaces.

HR 7578 also has a common proper motion companion, 2MASS J19542064−2356398. It is a red dwarf that is at least 580 astronomical units from the central star system. There is another star that is separated about 40″ away and is 4.4 magnitudes fainter, but is not physically associated with HR 7578.
