= Gliese 69 =

Star in the constellation Cassiopeia

Observation data Epoch J2000 Equinox ICRS
- Constellation: Cassiopeia
- Right ascension: 01^{h} 43^{m} 40.72397^{s}
- Declination: +63° 49′ 24.2351″
- Apparent magnitude (V): 8.40

Characteristics
- Evolutionary stage: main sequence
- Spectral type: K5 Vbe
- U−B color index: +1.12
- B−V color index: +1.22

Astrometry
Radial velocity (R_{v})	−50.827±0.0075 km/s
Proper motion (μ)	RA: −395.210±0.013 mas/yr Dec.: −582.833±0.018 mas/yr
Parallax (π)	73.9769±0.0183 mas
Distance	44.09 ± 0.01 ly (13.518 ± 0.003 pc)

Details
Mass	0.624 M_{☉}
Radius	0.59 R_{☉}
Surface gravity (log g)	4.70 cgs
Temperature	4312 K
Metallicity [Fe/H]	−0.39 dex
Age	6.89 ± 4.70 Gyr

Other designations
- BD+63° 229, GJ 69, HD 10436, HIP 8070, SAO 11943, LHS 1291.

Database references
SIMBAD	data
ARICNS	data

Gliese 69 is a star located in the constellation of Cassiopeia. It has an apparent magnitude of 8.40. Parallax measurements by Gaia put it at a distance of 44.09 light-years (13.6 parsecs) away.

Gliese 69 is a K-type main-sequence star that is smaller and less massive than the Sun. It glows with an effective temperature of 4,312 K. It is around 6.9 billion years old, significantly older than the Sun. Gliese 69 is also known by its designations HD 10436 and LHS 1291.

== Planetary System ==
In 2019 one candidate planet been detected by the radial velocity method.

The Gliese 69 planetary system
Companion (in order from star)	Mass	Semimajor axis (AU)	Orbital period (days)	Eccentricity	Inclination (°)	Radius
b (unconfirmed)	8.3+3.7 −3.2 M_{🜨}	0.043±0.004	3.84237+0.00085 −0.00054	0.03+0.20 −0.03	—	—
