= OU Geminorum =

Multiple star system in the constellation Gemini

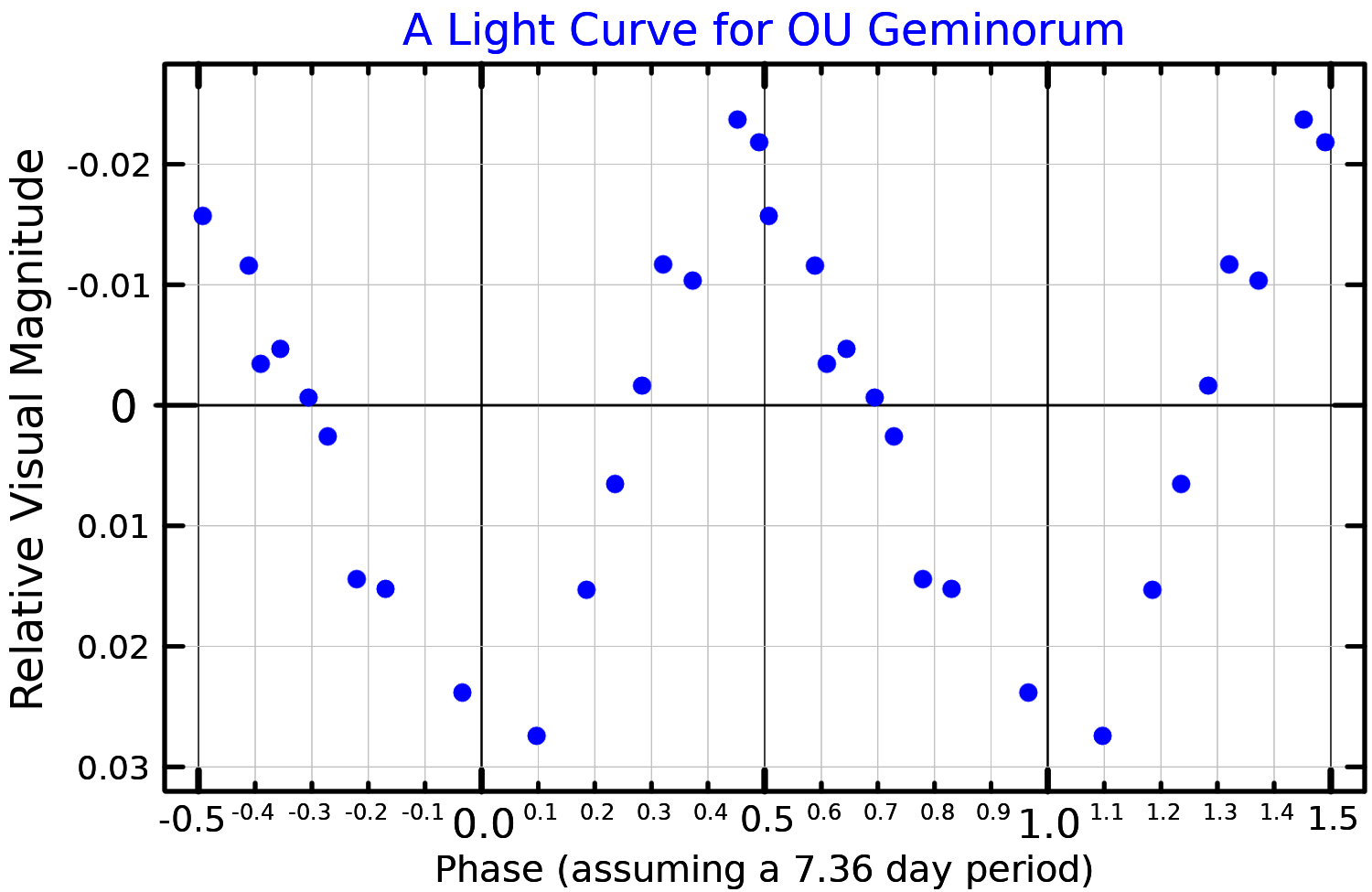
- A visual band light curve for OU Geminorum, adapted from Bopp et al. (1981)

Observation data Epoch J2000 Equinox ICRS
- Constellation: Gemini
- Right ascension: 06^{h} 26^{m} 10.2464^{s}
- Declination: +18° 45′ 24.896″
- Apparent magnitude (V): 6.768

Characteristics
- Spectral type: K3Vk
- U−B color index: 0.662
- B−V color index: 0.972
- Variable type: BY Dra

Astrometry
Radial velocity (R_{v})	−8.98±0.10 km/s
Proper motion (μ)	RA: −124.020±0.097 mas/yr Dec.: −159.335±0.054 mas/yr
Parallax (π)	68.46±0.34 mas
Distance	47.6 ± 0.2 ly (14.61 ± 0.07 pc)
Absolute magnitude (M_{V})	5.93±0.05

Orbit
Primary	OU Gem Aa
Name	OU Gem Ab
Period (P)	6.991878±0.000004 d
Eccentricity (e)	0.151±0.0024
Periastron epoch (T)	54900.0719±0.0203 JD
Argument of periastron (ω) (secondary)	77.63±1.09°
Semi-amplitude (K_{1}) (primary)	57.09±0.15 km/s
Semi-amplitude (K_{2}) (secondary)	66.22±0.28 km/s

Details

OU Gem Aa
Mass	0.85 M_{☉}
Radius	0.81 R_{☉}
Surface gravity (log g)	4.55 cgs
Temperature	4960 K

OU Gem Ab
Mass	0.71 M_{☉}
Radius	0.65 R_{☉}
Surface gravity (log g)	4.65 cgs
Temperature	4390 K

Other designations
- OU Gem, BD+18 1214, GJ 233, HD 45088, HIP 30630, SAO 95677

Database references
SIMBAD	data

OU Geminorum (OU Gem) is a visual binary or possible triple star located in the constellation of Gemini.

The system has an absolute magnitude of 5.93, so at a distance of 48 light years it has an apparent magnitude of 6.77 when viewed from earth. It also has a total proper motion of 0.210"/yr and belongs to the Ursa Major stream.

The system is a much studied BY Draconis variable star with a period of 6.99 days. The primary star has a spectral type of K3Vk. The secondary star in the system has a surface temperature of 4486±50 K and orbits the primary in about seven days.
