= HD 17925 =

Star in the constellation Eridanus

- Location of HD 17925 (circled in red)

Observation data Epoch J2000 Equinox ICRS
- Constellation: Eridanus
- Right ascension: 02^{h} 52^{m} 32.12819^{s}
- Declination: −12° 46′ 10.9681″
- Apparent magnitude (V): 6.03 to 6.08

Characteristics
- Evolutionary stage: Main sequence
- Spectral type: K1V
- U−B color index: +1.41
- B−V color index: +0.86
- Variable type: RS CVn

Astrometry
Radial velocity (R_{v})	+17.77±0.08 km/s
Proper motion (μ)	RA: 397.353 mas/yr Dec.: −189.281 mas/yr
Parallax (π)	96.5200±0.0258 mas
Distance	33.792 ± 0.009 ly (10.361 ± 0.003 pc)
Absolute magnitude (M_{V})	5.97

Details
Mass	0.88 M_{☉}
Radius	0.85±0.05 R_{☉}
Luminosity	0.408±0.005 L_{☉}
Surface gravity (log g)	4.58 cgs
Temperature	5,225±5 K
Metallicity [Fe/H]	+0.10 dex
Rotation	6.6 days
Rotational velocity (v sin i)	4.80 km/s
Age	100 Myr

Other designations
- 32 G. Eri, EP Eri, BD−13°544, GJ 117, HD 17925, HIP 13402, HR 857, SAO 148647, PLX 599

Database references
SIMBAD	data

HD 17925 is a variable star in the equatorial constellation of Eridanus. It has the Gould designation 32 G. Eridani and the variable star designation EP Eri. The star has a yellow-orange hue and is dimly visible to the naked eye in good seeing conditions with an apparent visual magnitude that varies from 6.03 down to 6.08. It is located nearby at a distance of 34 light years from the Sun based on parallax, and is drifting further away with a radial velocity of +18 km/s. It is a likely member of the Local Association of nearby, co-moving stars. The spectrum shows a strong abundance of lithium, indicating that it is young star. This likely makes its point of origin the nearby Scorpio–Centaurus Complex.

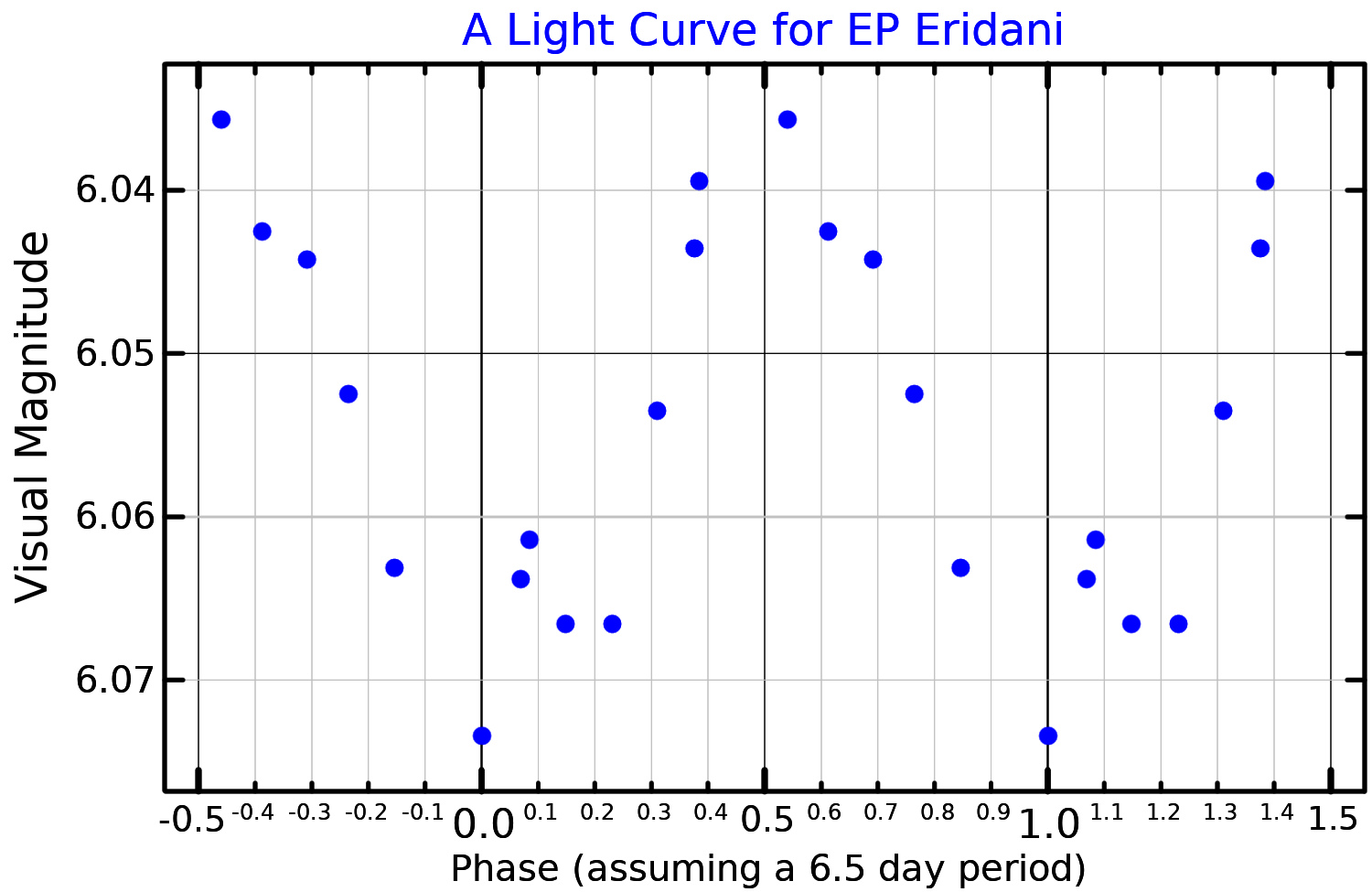
A visual band light curve for EP Eridani, adapted from Cutispoto (1992)

The stellar classification of HD 17925 is K1V, which indicates this is a K-type main-sequence star that is engaged in core hydrogen fusion. It is an active star that is classified as a RS Canum Venaticorum variable, showing a rotational modulation with a period of 6.9 days, and has been observed to flare. The star has an estimated age of 100 million years and is spinning with a projected rotational velocity of 4.8 km/s. The rotation period of 6.6 days days can be determined from its activity cycle. The star has 88% of the mass of the Sun and 85% of the Sun's radius. It is radiating 41% of the luminosity of the Sun from its photosphere at an effective temperature of 5,225 K.

The presence of an unseen companion has been suggested based on variations in the widths of absorption lines in the star's photosphere. It displays low-amplitude radial velocity variation, which may indicate it is a spectroscopic binary. However, the binary hypothesis doesn't appear to be consistent with Hipparcos satellite data. An infrared excess has been detected around this star, most likely indicating the presence of a circumstellar disk at a radius of 17.9 AU. The temperature of this dust is 52 K.
