= Gliese 42 =

Star in the constellation of Sculptor

Observation data Epoch J2000 Equinox ICRS
- Constellation: Sculptor
- Right ascension: 00^{h} 53^{m} 01.1349^{s}
- Declination: −30° 21′ 24.891″
- Apparent magnitude (V): +7.17

Characteristics
- Evolutionary stage: main sequence
- Spectral type: K2.5 V (k)
- B−V color index: 0.936

Astrometry
Radial velocity (R_{v})	−13.021±0.0064 km/s
Proper motion (μ)	RA: +620.243 mas/yr Dec.: +31.770 mas/yr
Parallax (π)	71.7259±0.0267 mas
Distance	45.47 ± 0.02 ly (13.942 ± 0.005 pc)
Absolute magnitude (M_{V})	+6.39

Details
Mass	0.81 M_{☉}
Radius	0.74 R_{☉}
Luminosity	0.29 L_{☉}
Surface gravity (log g)	4.60 cgs
Temperature	4,921 K
Metallicity [Fe/H]	−0.21 dex
Rotational velocity (v sin i)	1.8 km/s
Age	6.67±4.74 Gyr

Other designations
- BD−31°325, GJ 42, HD 5133, HIP 4148, SAO 192793, LTT 498, 2MASS J00530108-3021249

Database references
SIMBAD	data

Gliese 42 is a star in the southern constellation of Sculptor. It is too faint to be seen with the naked eye, having an apparent visual magnitude of +7.2. The annual parallax shift of 71.7 mas provides a distance estimate of 45 light years. It has a relatively high proper motion, advancing 0.62 arcseconds across the sky per annum, and is moving closer to the Sun with a radial velocity of −13 km/s.

The spectrum of the star matches a stellar classification of K2.5 V (k), indicating it is an ordinary K-type main-sequence star that is generating energy through hydrogen fusion at its core. It is radiating 29% of the Sun's luminosity from its photosphere at an effective temperature of 4,921 K. The star has 74% of the Sun's radius.

== Debris disk ==
An infrared excess has been detected around this star, most likely indicating the presence of a circumstellar disk at a radius of 45.7 astronomical units (6.84×10^{9} km; 4.25×10^{9} mi). The temperature of this dust was initially estimated as 30 K (−243.2 °C; −405.7 °F) according to measurement by Herschel Space Observatory. Later that measurement was deemed questionable, and fixed temperature of 62 K (−211.2 °C; −348.1 °F) was obtained in 2020.
