= List of Gliese and GJ objects (1-1000) =

This is a list of Gliese & GJ objects (1-1000) from the Gliese Catalogue of Nearby Stars. This astronomical catalogue is composed of stars within 25 parsecs of the Sun.

The data of these tables are from the SIMBAD Astronomical Database unless otherwise stated.

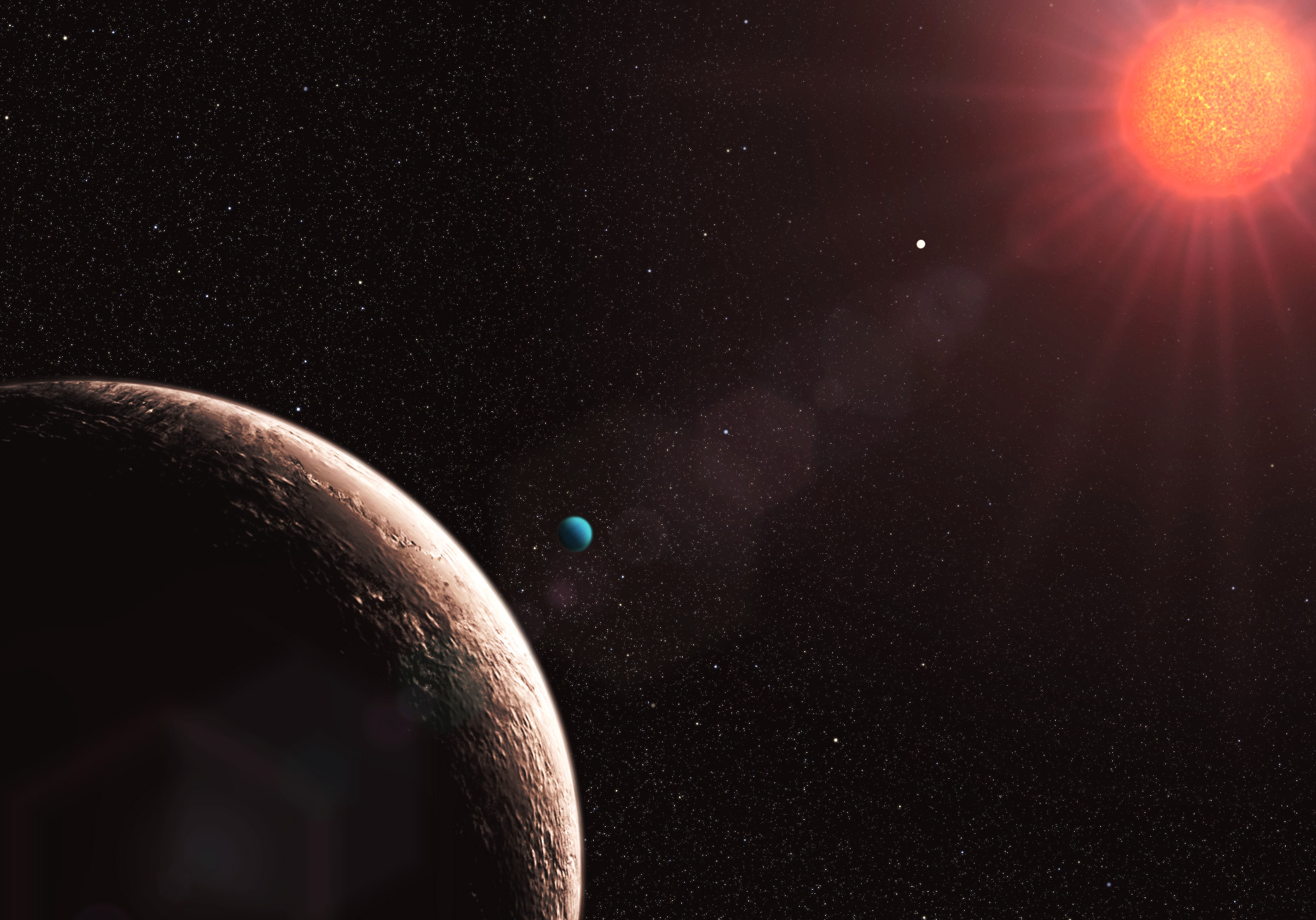
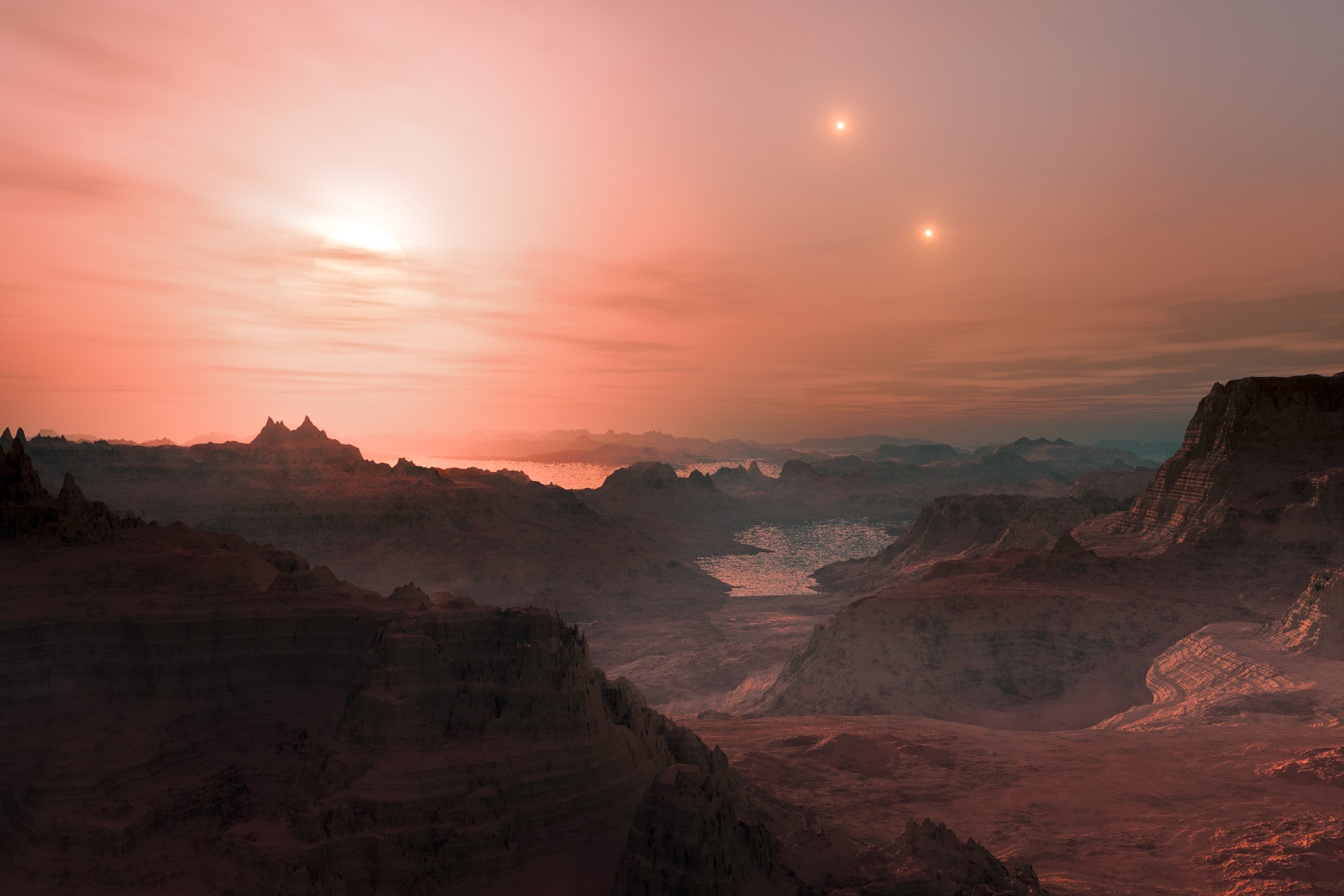
On the top is artistic representation of Gliese 581 e while on the bottom is the artistic representation of Gliese 667 Cc exoplanet.

== 1-100 ==
Gliese/GJ Number	Other Name	Constellation	Right ascension Declination	Distance (ly)	App. mag.	Spectral type	Planet
1		Sculptor		14.175 ± 0.002	8.57	M2V
2		Andromeda		37.51 ± 0.02	9.949	dM1.8
3	HD 55	Pisces		52.2 ± 0.07	8.485	K4.5V
4	ADS 48	Andromeda		36.9 ± 0.7	8.826 + 8.995	K6V + M0.5V
4.1	HD 123	Cassiopeia				G3V + G8V
4.2	HD 142	Phoenix				F7V + K5V
5	HD 166	Andromeda		44.94 ± 0.03	5.41	K0Ve
6	HD 400	Andromeda			6.21	F8 IV
7	CD-27 16				11.72	M0V
8	Beta Cassiopeiae (Caph)	Cassiopeia		54.7 ± 0.3	+2.28 (2.25–2.31)	F2 III
9	HD 469					G8III + A/F
9.1						K0III
10	6 Ceti	Cetus		61.1 ± 0.7	4.89	F8 V Fe−0.8 CH−0.5
10.1	HD 741					G3V
11	G 241-76					M4
12		Pisces		39.68 ± 0.02	12.6	M4V	b
13	HD 1273				6.83	G2V
14					9.02	K7
15	Groombridge 34	Andromeda		A:11.6191 ± 0.0008 B:11.620 ± 0.001	A:8.119 B:11.007	M1.4V + M4.1V	Ab Ac
16.1	HD 1461	Cetus		76.5 ± 0.1	6.47	G3VFe0.5	b,c
17	Zeta Tucanae	Tucana		28.01 ± 0.04	4.23	F9.5 V
18	HD 2025				7.92	K3 V
19	Beta Hydri	Hydrus		24.33 ± 0.02	2.80	G2 IV
20	Kappa Phoenicis	Phoenix		77.7 ± 0.3	3.94	A5IVn
21	HIP 2120				10.53	M0.5
22	V547 Cassiopeiae	Cassiopeia		32.8 ± 0.7	10.29/12.19/13.2	M2.5Ve / M3V	b
23	13 Ceti	Cetus		69.3 ± 1	5.20	F6 V + G4 V + K3.5 V
24 A	HD 3405/HIP 2888				6.77	G3 V ~
25	HIP 2941, HR 159	Cetus		50 ± 1	5.57	A:G9V B:K0.5V
26	LHS 119				11.07	M2.5
27	54 Piscium	Pisces		36.23 ± 0.02	5.88	K0V + T7.5V	Ab
28	HD 3765	Andromeda		58.41 ± 0.02	7.34	K2V	b
31	Beta Ceti	Cetus		96.3 ± 0.5	2.02	K0 III
34	Eta Cassiopeiae	Cassiopeia	00^{h} 49^{m} 06.29070^{s}	A: 19.32 ± 0.02, B: 19.331 ± 0.002	A: 3.44, B: 5.71	RS CVn?
35	van Maanen 2	Pisces		14.072 ± 0.001	12.374	DZ8
36	HD 4747	Cetus		61.0 ± 0.6	7.155	G8V + L9
37	Phi² Ceti	Cetus		51.8 ± 0.1	5.172	F7V
41	HR 244	Cassiopeia		61.7 ± 0.1	4.80	F9V
42	HD 5133	Sculptor		45.59 ± 0.04	7.3029	K2.5 V (k)
49	BD+61°195	Cassiopeia		32.158 ± 0.005	9.56±0.02	M1.5 V
53	Mu Cassiopeiae (Marfak)	Cassiopeia		25.03 ± 0.08	5.159 (5.14/11.45)	G5Vb + M4V
53.3	Mirach/Beta Andromedae	Andromeda		197 ± 7	2.067 (2.01 to 2.10)	M0 III
53.4	44 Andromedae	Andromeda		173.4 ± 0.3	5.67	F8 V
54		Tucana		25.70 ± 0.08	9.80	M2.5
54.1	YZ Ceti	Cetus		12.122 ± 0.002	12.03 - 12.18	M4.0Ve
55	Nu Phoenicis	Phoenix		49.77 ± 0.05	4.95	F9 V Fe+0.4
56.5	HD 7924	Cassiopeia		55.45 ± 0.02	7.167	K0.5V
61	Upsilon Andromedae/Titawin	Andromeda		A: 44.0 ± 0.1, B: 43.97 ± 0.02	4.10	F9V + M4.5V	b (Saffar) c (Samh) d (Majriti)
65		Cetus		8.770 ± 0.010	12.8 + 12.8	M5.5V + M6 V
66	p Eridani	Eridanus		26.710 ± 0.008 + 26.733 ± 0.007	5.76 + 5.87	K2V + K2V
67	HD 10307	Andromeda		41.2 ± 0.3	4.95 / 11	G1.5 V + M V
67.1	HD 10800	Octans		88.1 ± 0.5	5.87	G1 V
68	107 Piscium	Pisces		24.80 ± 0.03	5.24	K1V
69	HD 10436	Cassiopeia		44.3 ± 0.6	8.40	K5 Vbe	b (Unconfirmed)
71	Tau Ceti/HD 10700	Cetus		11.912 ± 0.007	3.50 ± 0.01	G8V	a b c d e f g h (e f g h unconfirmed)
72	109 Piscium	Pisces		108.2 ± 0.1	6.27	G3 Va	b
75	HR 511	Cassiopeia		32.75 ± 0.01	5.63	K0 V
80	Beta Arietis/Sheratan	Aries		58.4 ± 0.3	2.655 (2.712 + 5.789)	A3V + G2V
81	Chi Eridani	Eridanus		56.8 ± 0.3	3.70 / 10.7	G8IV or G8IIIb CNIV
83	Alpha Hydri	Hydrus		71.8 ± 0.7	2.90	F0 IV
83.1	TZ Arietis	Aries		14.578 ± 0.005	12.298	M4.5 V	b
86	13 G Eridani/HD 13445	Eridanus		35.18 ± 0.02	6.17	K1V + DQ6	b
89	Mu Fornacis	Fornax		320 ± 8	5.27	A0 V
92	Delta Trianguli	Triangulum		35.2 ± 0.1	4.865	G0V + G9V to K4V
94	Ross 19	Triangulum		56.89 ± 0.04	12.70	M3.5 + T9-Y0
95	HD 14412	Fornax		41.86 ± 0.03	6.33	G8V
97	Kappa Fornacis	Fornax		74.0 ± 0.	5.3187±0.0005	G1V-IV + M0V / ~M0V
99.1	13 Trianguli	Triangulum		102.9 ± 0.3	5.89	G0 V

== 100-200 ==
Gliese/GJ Number	Other Name	Constellation	Right ascension Declination	Distance (ly)	App. mag.	Spectral type	Planet
105		Cetus		AC:23.58 ± 0.05 B:23.560 ± 0.007	5.83 + 11.670 + 16.77	AC:K3 V + M7 V B:M3.5 V
105.6	12 Persei	Perseus		78.9 ± 0.8	4.94	F9 V
107	Theta Persei	Perseus		36.29 ± 0.09	4.11 / 9.987	F8 V + M1.5 V
108	Iota Horologii	Horologium		56.61 ± 0.04	5.40	G0Vp
111	Tau¹ Eridani	Eridanus		46 ± 1	4.46	F7V
117	HD 17925	Eridanus		33.792 ± 0.009	6.04	K1V
120.2	51 Arietis	Aries		69.17 ± 0.09	6.623 ± 0.005	G8 V
121	Tau³ Eridani	Eridanus		88.6 ± 0.4	4.10	A3 IV-V
111	Iota Persei	Perseus		34.50 ± 0.05	4.062	G0V or F9.5 V
127	Alpha Fornacis/Dalim	Fornax		45.66 ± 0.08	3.80 (3.98/7.19)	F6V + G7V
128	94 Ceti	Cetus		73.6 ± 0.5	5.070	F8V / M3V / M	b
136	Zeta Reticuli	Reticulum		39.28 ± 0.02 + 39.27 ± 0.03	5.52 + 5.22	G3−5V + G2V
137	Kappa¹ Ceti	Cetus		30.26 ± 0.05	4.84	G5Vv
139	82 G. Eridani	Eridanus		19.704 ± 0.009	4.254	G6 V
143	HD 21749	Reticulum		53.27 ± 0.01	8.143	K4.5V	b c
144	Epsilon Eridani/Ran	Eridanus		10.475 ± 0.004	3.736	K2V	b (Ægir)
146	HD 22496	Horologium		44.363 ± 0.010	8.64	K6.5V	b
147	10 Tauri	Taurus		45.5 ± 0.3	4.29	F8 V
150	Delta Eridani/Rana	Eridanus		29.64 ± 0.05	3.53	K0 IV
155	Tau^{6} Eridani	Eridanus		57.5 ± 0.2	4.22	F5IV-V
160	39 Tauri	Taurus		54.84 ± 0.03	5.90	G5 V
163		Dorado		49.36 ± 0.01	11.79	M3.5V	b c d e f
166	40 Eridani	Eridanus		16.340 ± 0.010 + 16.333 ± 0.004 + 16.353 ± 0.006	4.43 + 9.52 + 11.17	K0.5V + DA4 + M4.5eV
167	HD 27274	Dorado		42.544 ± 0.008	7.63	K4.5 Vk:
167.1	Gamma Doradus	Dorado		66.6 ± 0.2	4.25	F1V
169.1	Stein 2051	Camelopardalis		17.995 ± 0.005 + 17.993 ± 0.002	10.98 + 12.43	M4.0Ve + DC5
171.1	Aldebaran	Taurus		67 ± 1 + 69.0 ± 0.1	0.86 (0.75–0.95) + 13.21	K5+ III + M2.5
171.2	HD 283750	Taurus		56.73 ± 0.05	8.02 - 8.40	K5Ve
174	HD 29697	Taurus		43.0 ± 0.6	7.94 - 8.33	K3 V
176	HD 285968	Taurus		30.937 ± 0.006	9.95	M2V	b
177	58 Eridani	Eridanus		43.18 ± 0.03	5.47 - 5.51	G1.5 V CH-0.5
177.1	HD 30562	Eridanus		85.27 ± 0.09	5.77	G2IV or G5V or F8V
178	Pi³ Orionis/Tabit	Orion		26.32 ± 0.04	3.16	F6 V
179		Orion		40.48 ± 0.01	11.94	M2V or M3.5	b
180		Eridanus		38.972 ± 0.007	10.894	M2V or M3V	b c d
182	V1005 Orionis	Orion		79.57 ± 0.02	10.107±0.053 (9.96 to 10.17)	M0Ve
183	HR 1614	Eridanus		28.845 ± 0.006	6.208	K3 V
185	HD 32450	Lepus		28.0 ± 0.4	8.317 (8.66 / 10.60)	K7V
187	Eta¹ Pictoris	Pictor		85.0 ± 0.4	5.37	F5 V
188	104 Tauri	Taurus		50.3 ± 0.3	4.92	G4V
189	Zeta Doradus A	Dorado		37.91 ± 0.07	4.708	F7V
191	Kapteyn's Star	Pictor		12.8308 ± 0.0008	8.80 – 8.85	sdM1 or M1.5V
194 & 195	Capella	Auriga		A:42.919±0.049 H:43.52 ± 0.01 L:43.38 ± 0.03	A:0.08 (+0.03 – +0.16) H:10.16 L:13.7	A:G3III: (G8III + G0III) H:M2.5 V L:M4:
196	HD 33564	Camelopardalis		67.8 ± 0.1	5.08	F7V	b
197	Lambda Aurigae	Auriga		40.97 ± 0.05	4.71	G1 V or G1.5 IV-V Fe-1

== 200-300 ==
Gliese/GJ Number	Other Name	Constellation	Right ascension Declination	Distance (ly)	App. mag.	Spectral type	Planet
201 & 202	111 Tauri	Taurus		47.43 ± 0.02 + 47.55 ± 0.07	7.9 + 5.0	K5 V + F8 V
205	HD 36395	Orion		18.604 ± 0.002	7.932	M1.5V
208	V2689 Orionis	Orion		37.2 ± 0.1	8.80 - 9.05	M0.0 Ve
209	HD 37124	Taurus		103.4 ± 0.2	7.68	G4IV-V	b c d
211	V538 Aurigae	Auriga		40.05 ± 0.02	6.25	K1 V
213	Ross 47	Orion		18.888 ± 0.003	11.48 - 11.55	M4V
216 A	Gamma Leporis	Lepus		29.04 ± 0.04	3.587	F6 V
217.2	HD 39194	Mensa		86.23 ± 0.05	8.07±0.01	K0 V	b c d
219	Beta Pictoris	Pictor		63.4 ± 0.1	3.861	A6V
221		Orion		66.23 ± 0.02	9.70	K7V/M0V	b c d
222	Chi¹ Orionis	Orion		28.4 ± 0.1	4.38 - 4.41	G0 V
223.2	LP 658-2	Orion		21.010 ± 0.002	14.488	DZ11.8
225	Eta Leporis	Lepus		48.5 ± 0.2	3.72	F2 V
229	HD 42581	Lepus		18.791 ± 0.002	8.12	M1Ve +T7+T8
231	Alpha Mensae	Mensa		33.31 ± 0.02	5.09	G7 V + M3.5-6.5 V
233	OU Geminorum	Gemini		47.6 ± 0.2	6.768	K3Vk
234	Ross 614	Monoceros		13.42 ± 0.05	11.15 + 14.23	M4.5V + M8V
239	HD 260655	Gemini		32.608 ± 0.007	9.77±0.11	M0.0V	b c
143	Nu² Canis Majoris	Canis Major		66.8 ± 0.2	3.96	K1 III	b c
240.1	HD 46588	Camelopardalis		59.37 ± 0.06	5.44	F7 V + L9	b
242	Xi Geminorum/Alzirr	Gemini		58.7 ± 0.2	3.35	F5 IV-V
244	Sirius	Canis Major		8.60±0.04	−1.46 + 8.44	A0mA1 Va + DA2
245	Psi^{5} Aurigae	Auriga		54.18 ± 0.08	5.200±0.031	G0 V
248	Alpha Pictoris	Pictor		97 ± 5	3.27	A8 Vn kA6
250	HD 50281	Monoceros		28.54 ± 0.01	6.58	K3.5 V
251		Gemini		18.215 ± 0.003	10.11	M3.0Ve	b
252	37 Geminorum	Gemini		57.0 ± 0.1	5.74	G0 V
260	HD 53143	Carina		59.82 ± 0.02	6.80	G9 V
264 & 264.1	HD 53680, HD 53705, and HD 53706	Puppis		55.64 ± 0.05 + 55.64 ± 0.01 + 56.4 ± 0.3	5.559±0.003 + 6.859±0.003 + 8.686	G1.5V + K0.5V + K6V
268		Auriga		19.741 ± 0.008	11.52	M4.5Ve
271	Delta Geminorum	Gemini		60.5 ± 0.7	3.53	F0 IV
273	Luyten's Star	Canis Minor		12.348 ± 0.002	9.872	M3.5V
273.1 & 274	Rho Geminorum	Gemini		58.9 ± 0.3	4.2473±0.003 + 12.50 + 7.74	F1V + K2.5V
275.2	G 107-69/70	Lynx			G 107-69: 13.2, G107-70: 15.0	M4.5+DA+DA
278	Castor/Alpha Geminorum	Gemini		49.15±0.027 + 49.19 ± 0.02	1.93 + 2.97 + 9.83	A1V + dM1e + Am + dM1e + dM1e + dM1e
279	HD 60532	Puppis		85.5 ± 0.2	4.450	F6 IV-V	b c
280	Procyon/Alpha Canis Minoris	Canis Minor		11.46 ± 0.05	0.34 (A) / 10.7 (B)	F5 IV–V + DQZ
282		Monoceros		45.92 ± 0.02	7.30 + 9.01 + 9.87	K2V + K7V + M1.5Ve
285	YZ Canis Minoris	Canis Minor		19.533 ± 0.004	11.15	M5 V
286	Pollux/Beta Geminorum	Gemini		33.78 ± 0.09	1.14	K0 III
288	171 G. Puppis	Puppis		49.6 ± 0.4	5.38 + 16.7	F9 V
291	9 Puppis	Puppis		53.8 ± 0.5	5.16	G0V (G1 + G9)
293		Volans		26.644 ± 0.002	13.96	DC8.8, or DC10.3
297.1	HR 3220	Carina		58.9 ± 0.6	4.75	F6 V Fe-0.8 CH-0.4
299		Cancer		22	13.24	M4.5 Ve

== 300-400 ==
Gliese/GJ Number	Other Name	Constellation	Right ascension Declination	Distance (ly)	App. mag.	Spectral type	Planet
302	HD 69830	Puppis		41.03 ± 0.02	5.98	G8V	b c d
303	Chi Cancri	Cancer		59.44 ± 0.10	5.14	F6V
304	HD 70642	Puppis		95.51 ± 0.04	7.17	G6V CN+0.5	b
305	Alpha Chamaeleontis	Chamaeleon		63.8 ± 0.1	4.06	F5 V Fe-0.8
309	HR 3384	Pyxis		39.8 ± 0.2	6.38	G9V
311	Pi¹ Ursae Majoris	Ursa Major		46.8 ± 0.2	5.63	G1.5Vb
314	HD 73752	Pyxis		64.0 ± 0.4	5.17	(G5IV + unknown) + K0V or GV
317		Pyxis		49.59 ± 0.04	11.98	M2.5V	b c
318		Pyxis		27.783 ± 0.005	11.85	DA5.5
324	55 Cancri (Copernicus)	Cancer		A:41.05 ± 0.02 B:40.95 ± 0.02	A:5.95 B:13.15	A:K0IV–V B:M4.5V	b (Galileo) c (Brahe) d (Lipperhey) e (Janssen) f (Harriot)
327	HD 76151	Hydra		54.95 ± 0.04	6.00	G2V
328		Hydra		66.92 ± 0.03	9.997	M0V	b c
331	Iota Ursae Majoris (Talitha)	Ursa Major		47.3 ± 0.1	3.14/10.1/10.3	A7V(n) + M3V + M4V
332	10 Ursae Majoris	Lynx		52.4 ± 0.6	3.960 (4.18 / 6.48)	F3V + K0V
335	Sigma² Ursae Majoris	Ursa Major		66.5 ± 0.5	4.813 + 10.26	F6IV-V / K2V
337	81 Cancri	Cancer		66.4 ± 0.5	6.49	G8V + K1V / L8 + ~L8
338	ADS 7251	Ursa Major		A:20.657 ± 0.003 B:20.658 ± 0.003	A:7.64 B:7.70	A:M0V B:K7V	b
341		Carina		34.082 ± 0.005	9.465	M1V	b
344	HR 3750	Hydra		101 ± 1	5.40	G1.5
348	Tau¹ Hydrae	Hydra		A:57.9 ± 0.5 B:58.91 ± 0.07	+4.59 (4.60 + 7.15)	F6 V + ? + K0
351	Psi Velorum	Vela		61.4 ± 0.4	+3.58 (3.91 + 5.12)	F0 IV + F3 IV
354	Theta Ursae Majoris	Ursa Major		43.96 ± 0.08	3.166	F6 IV
355	LQ Hydrae	Hydra		59.59 ± 0.03	7.82 (7.79 to 7.86)	K1Vp
356	11 Leonis Minoris	Leo Minor		36.64 ± 0.04	5.54 + 14.0	G8V + M4
357		Hydra		30.776 ± 0.007	10.906	M2.5V	b c d
364	HD 84117	Hydra		48.77 ± 0.08	4.918±0.046	F8V
367	Añañuca	Vela		30.719 ± 0.004	10.153±0.044	M1.0V	b (Tahay) c d
368	15 Leonis Minoris	Ursa Major		61.7 ± 0.1	5.08	G0 IV-V
370	HD 85512	Vela		36.782 ± 0.007	7.66	K6V
376	20 Leonis Minoris	Leo Minor		48.68 ± 0.07	+5.40	G3 Va Hδ1 + M7 V	b
378.3	21 Leonis Minoris	Leo Minor		92.1 ± 0.5	4.47–4.52	A7V
379.1	HD 88218	Antlia		103.5 ± 0.1	6.14	G0 V
380	Groombridge 1618	Ursa Major		15.886 ± 0.002	+6.60	K7.5 Ve
387	39 Leonis	Leo		72.6 ± 0.1	5.81/11.40	F6 V + M1
388	AD Leonis	Leo		16.194 ± 0.002	9.32	M3.5eV
391	HR 4102	Carina		52.9 ± 0.1	3.99	F3 V
392	HR 4098	Ursa Major		A:74.99 ± 0.07 B:75.01 ± 0.08	6.45 + 6.45	G0V
393		Sextans		22.953 ± 0.003	9.65	M2V	b
394 & 395	36 Ursae Majoris	Ursa Major		A:42.22 ± 0.04 B:42.135 ± 0.010	4.82 + 8.86	F8 V + K7Ve

== 400-500 ==
Gliese/GJ Number	Other Name	Constellation	Right ascension Declination	Distance (ly)	App. mag.	Spectral type	Planet
402		Leo		22.722 ± 0.005	11.64 - 11.70	M4.0V
406	Wolf 359	Leo	10^{h} 56^{m} 28.92087^{s}	7.856 ± 0.001	13.507	M6V	b (unconfirmed)
407	47 Ursae Majoris (Chalawan)	Ursa Major		45.30 ± 0.06	5.03	G1V	b (Taphao Thong) c (Taphao Kaew) d
408		Leo		22.008 ± 0.004	10.020	M2.5V
411	Lalande 21185	Ursa Major		8.3044 ± 0.0007	7.520	M2V	b c d
412		Ursa Major		A:15.997 ± 0.003 B:16.001 ± 0.004	8.68 + 14.45	M1.0V + M6.0V
412.2	HD 96700	Hydra		82.79 ± 0.04	6.51	G0 V	b c d
414		Ursa Major		A:38.75 ± 0.01 B:38.756 ± 0.009	8.864±0.012 + 10	K7V + M2V	Ab Ac
419	Delta Leonis (Zosma)	Leo		58.4 ± 0.3	2.56	A4 V
422	Innes' star	Carina		41.34 ± 0.02	11.516	M3.5V	b
423	Xi Ursae Majoris (Alula Australis)	Ursa Major		28.5 ± 0.1	A:4.264 B:4.729	F8.5:V + G2V
429	83 Leonis	Leo		A:59.29 ± 0.03 B:59.23 ± 0.03	A:6.45 B:7.58	G9IV-V + K2V
432	HR 4458	Hydra		A:31.177 ± 0.008 B:31.164 ± 0.008	A:5.97 B:15	K0 V + DC8
433		Hydra		29.605 ± 0.005	9.81	M2V	b c d
434	61 Ursae Majoris	Ursa Major		31.24 ± 0.04	5.35	G8V
435	HD 101581	Centaurus		41.694 ± 0.010	7.762	K4.5Vk:	b c
436	Noquisi	Leo		31.882 ± 0.009	10.67	M2.5 V	b (Awohali)
439	HIP 57274	Ursa Major		84.4 ± 0.1	8.96	K5 V
440		Musca		15.123 ± 0.001	11.50	DQ6
442	HD 102365	Centaurus		A:30.40 ± 0.02 B:30.362 ± 0.010	A:4.88 B:15	G2V + M4V
445		Camelopardalis		17.137 ± 0.002	10.80	M4.0Ve
447	Ross 128	Virgo		11.007 ± 0.001	11.13	M4V
448	Denebola (Beta Leonis)	Leo		35.9 ± 0.2	2.14	A3Va
449	Beta Virginis (Zavijava)	Virgo		35.65 ± 0.09	3.604	F9 V
451	Groombridge 1830	Ursa Major		29.914 ± 0.005	6.44	K1V Fe−1.5
454	HD 104304	Virgo		41.41 ± 0.06	5.54	G8 IV + M4V
459	Megrez (Delta Ursae Majoris)	Ursa Major		80.5 ± 0.3	3.312	A3 V
465	Ross 695	Corvus		28.947 ± 0.006	11.272	M2.0V
470	Gacrux (Gamma Crucis)	Crux		88.6 ± 0.4	1.64	M3.5 III
471.2	Eta Corvi	Corvus		59.6 ± 0.2	4.29–4.32	F2 V
473	Wolf 424	Virgo		14.37 ± 0.02	A: 13.22 ± 0.01 B: 13.21 ± 0.01	dM6e/dM6e
475	Beta Canum Venaticorum (Chara)	Canis Venatici		27.63 ± 0.04	4.25	G0 V
482	Gamma Virginis (Porrima)	Virgo		38.1 ± 0.3	2.74 (3.650/3.560)‍	F0 V/F0 V
484	10 Canum Venaticorum	Canis Venatici		57.26 ± 0.03	5.95	G0 V
486	Gar	Virgo		26.351 ± 0.007	11.395	M3.5V	b (Su)
486.1	HD 111395	Coma Berenices		55.77 ± 0.03	6.29	G7V
494	Ross 458	Virgo		37.53 ± 0.05	9.79	M0.5 + M7.0

== 500-600 ==
Gliese/GJ Number	Other Name	Constellation	Right ascension Declination	Distance (ly)	App. mag.	Spectral type	Planet
501	Alpha Comae Berenices (Diadem)	Coma Berenices		58.1 ± 0.9	A: 4.85 / B: 5.53	A: F5V / B: F5V
501.2	HD 114613	Centaurus		66.7 ± 0.1	4.852±0.011	G4 IV
502	Beta Comae Berenices	Coma Berenices		30.00 ± 0.05	4.26	G0 V
503	HD 114837	Centaurus		59.49 ± 0.09	4.90 + 10.2	F6 V Fe-0.4
504	59 Virginis	Virgo		57.4 ± 0.1		G0V	b
505	HD 115404	Coma Berenices		A:35.834 ± 0.009 B:35.862 ± 0.009	A:6.66 B:9.50	A:K2 V B:M0.5 V
506	61 Virginis	Virgo		27.84 ± 0.03	4.74	G7V	b c d
512.1	70 Virginis	Virgo		59.03 ± 0.08	4.97	G4 V-IV	b
514		Virgo		24.878 ± 0.005	9.029	M0Ve	b
517	EQ Virginis	Virgo		66.93 ± 0.08	9.36	K5Ve
518	Wolf 489	Virgo		27.235 ± 0.007	14.66	DZ10.0
521		Canis Venatici		43.605 ± 0.009	10.26	M1V
525.1	1 Centauri	Centaurus		63.3 ± 0.2	4.23	F2 V
536		Virgo		33.990 ± 0.009	9.707	M0V	b c
526	HD 119850	Boötes		17.726 ± 0.002	8.46	M1.5V
527	Tau Boötis	Boötes		50.92 ± 0.09	4.50	F6V + M2	b
532.1	HD 121056	Centaurus		208.7 ± 0.6	6.17	K0 III	b c
534	Eta Boötis	Boötes		37.2 ± 0.5	2.680	G0 IV
539	Theta Centauri (Menkent)	Centaurus		58.8 ± 0.2	2.06	K0 III
539.1	HD 122862	Apus		95.51 ± 0.07	6.02	G2/3 IV
541	Arcturus (Alpha Boötis)	Boötes		36.7 ± 0.2	−0.05	K1.5 III Fe−0.5
542	HD 125072	Centaurus		38.62 ± 0.02	6.637	K3 IV
547	HD 126053	Virgo		56.95 ± 0.04	6.25	G1 V + sdT7.5
549	Theta Boötis (Asellus Primus)	Boötes		47.2 ± 0.1	4.05 + 13.23	F7 V + M2.5V
550.3	HIP 70849	Lupus		78.66 ± 0.03	10.36	K7Vk	b
551	Proxima Centauri	Centaurus		4.2465 ± 0.0003	10.43 – 11.11	M5.5Ve	b, c, d (c is disputed)
555	HN Librae	Libra		20.395 ± 0.007	11.32	M4.0V	b c (unconfirmed)
557	Sigma Boötis	Boötes		51.39 ± 0.09	4.46	F4VkF2mF1
559	Alpha Centauri (Rigil Kentaurus & Toliman)	Centaurus		4.344 ± 0.002	0.01 + 1.33	G2V + K1V	b (unconfirmed)
559.1	EK Draconis	Draco		111.32	7.701-7.753	G1.5V
560	Alpha Circini (Xami)	Circinus		54.0 ± 0.1	3.18 - 3.21	A7 Vp SrCrEu
564	HD 130948	Boötes		59.35 ± 0.04	5.99	F9 IV-V
566	Xi Boötis	Boötes		A:22.03 ± 0.02 B:22.011 ± 0.008	4.675 + 6.816	G8 Ve + K4 Ve
567	HR 5553	Boötes		37.5 ± 0.2	6.00	K0 V
569		Boötes		32.446 ± 0.007	10.15	M3 + M8.5 + M9
570		Libra		A:19.199 ± 0.007 BC:19.3 ± 0.1 D:19.3 ± 0.2	5.75 / 8.07 / 10.5	K4V / M1V / M3V / T7V
575	44 Boötis (Quadrans)	Boötes		41.6 ± 0.5	4.70 - 4.84	G0Vnv + (K0V + K4V)
578	45 Boötis	Boötes		63.1 ± 0.2	4.93	F5 V
579.2	HD 134439 and HD 134440	Libra		A:96.0 ± 0.1 B:96.5 ± 0.1	9.066 + 9.426	sd:K1Fe-1 + sdK2.5
579.4	23 Librae	Libra		85.39 ± 0.08	6.45	G5 V	b c
581		Libra		20.549 ± 0.004	10.56 to 10.58	M3V	b c e
582	Nu^{2} Lupi	Lupus		48.07 ± 0.04	5.65	G4V	b c d
584	Eta Coronae Borealis	Corona Borealis		55.48 ± 0.08	4.98	G1V / G3V / L8
585	Ross 508	Serpens		36.59 ± 0.01	14.18±0.20	M4.5
588		Lupus		19.300 ± 0.003	9.311	M2.5V
594	HD 139664	Lupus		56.7 ± 0.1	4.64	F3/5V
598	Lambda Serpentis	Serpens		38.87 ± 0.07	4.43	G0 V	b

== 600-700 ==
Gliese/GJ Number	Other Name	Constellation	Right ascension Declination	Distance (ly)	App. mag.	Spectral type	Planet
601	Beta Trianguli Australis	Triangulum Australe		40.37 ± 0.08	2.85	F1 V
602	Chi Herculis	Hercules		52.53 ± 0.07	4.59	G0V Fe-0.8 CH-0.5
603	Gamma Serpentis	Serpens		36.42 ± 0.07	3.85	F6 V
614	14 Herculis	Hercules		58.38 ± 0.03	6.61	K0 V	b c
616	18 Scorpii	Scorpius		46.11 ± 0.04	5.503	G2 Va
617	HD 147379	Draco		A:35.117 ± 0.006 B:35.109 ± 0.006	8.9 + 10.69-10.74	M0.0V + M3V
623		Hercules		26.09 ± 0.06		M3.0V
624	Zeta Trianguli Australis	Triangulum Australe		39.36 ± 0.08	4.91	F9V + M4V
625		Draco		21.131 ± 0.002	10.13	M1.5V
628	Wolf 1061	Ophiuchus		14.050 ± 0.002	10.07	M3.5V	b c d
630.1	CM Draconis	Draco		48.47 ± 0.02	12.87	M4.5V + M4.5V + DQ8
631	12 Ophiuchi	Ophiuchius		32.27 ± 0.02	5.77	K1V
632	HD 150706	Ursa Minor		91.92 ± 0.03	7.016	G0V	b
635	Zeta Herculis (Tianji)	Hercules		35.0 ± 0.2	2.81	F9IV + G7V
636	Eta Herculis	Hercules		112 ± 2	3.487	G7.5IIIb
638	HD 151288	Hercules		32.114 ± 0.005	8.11	K7.5Ve
643 & 644	V1054 Ophiuchi	Ophiuchius		AB:20.2 ± 0.7 GJ 643: 21.196 ± 0.007 C:21.184 ± 0.008	AB:9.74/10.34/10.84 GJ 643: 11.74 C:16.80	M3V + M4Ve + M4Ve + M3.5V + M7.0V
648	19 Draconis	Draco		49.8 ± 0.3	4.89	F8V
649		Hercules		33.892 ± 0.009	9.655	M1.0V	b
651	HD 154345	Hercules		59.59 ± 0.02	6.76	G8V	b
656	HD 154577	Ara		44.4 ± 0.4	7.385	K2.5Vk:
656.1	Eta Ophiuchi (Sabik)	Ophiuchius		88 ± 2	A:3.05 B:3.27	A2V + A2V
657	Eta Scorpii	Scorpius		A:73.5 ± 0.3 B:72.84 ± 0.05	A:3.33 B:11.23	F5IV + ?
661	HD 155876	Hercules		20.8 ± 0.2	9.93 + 10.35	M3V + M4V
663 & 664	36 Ophiuchi (A:Guniibuu)	Ophiuchius		AB:19.40 ± 0.01 C:19.418 ± 0.004	5.08/5.03/6.34	K2V + K1V + K5V
666	41 G. Arae	Ara		A:28.67 ± 0.02 B:28.645 ± 0.008	A:5.61 B:8.88	G8V + M0V
667		Scorpius		AB:23.6 ± 0.1 C:23.623 ± 0.005	5.91/7.20/10.20	K3V + K5V	Cb Cc
670	Xi Ophiuchi	Ophiuchius		57.1 ± 0.2	4.39	F2V
672	72 Herculis	Hercules		47.57 ± 0.04	5.38	G0V
673	HD 157881	Ophiuchius		25.157 ± 0.003	7.492	K7V
674		Ara		14.849 ± 0.002	9.38	M3V	b
675	HD 158633	Draco		41.72 ± 0.01	6.44	K0V
676		Ara		52.12 ± 0.02	A:9.59 B:13.37	M0V + M3V	d e b c
678	HD 158614	Ophiuchius		53.3 ± 0.6	6.02 + 5.93	G9IV-V + G9IV-V
681	Rasalhague (Alpha Ophiuchi)	Ophiuchius		48.6 ± 0.8	2.07	A5IVnn + K5-7 V
682		Scorpius		16.333 ± 0.003	10.94	M3.5V	b c (unconfirmed)
683	Pi Arae	Ara		133.8 ± 0.4	5.25	A5IV-V
684 & 685	26 Draconis	Draco		AB:47.1 ± 0.1 C:46.67 ± 0.01	AB: 5.326 C:9.97	F9V + K3V +M0V	Cb
686		Hercules		26.613 ± 0.004	9.577	M1.0V	b
687		Draco		14.839 ± 0.001	9.15	M3.5V	b c
691	Mu Arae (Cervantes)	Ara		50.89 ± 0.07	5.15	G3IV-V	c (Dulcinea) d (Rocinante) b (Quijote) e (Sancho)
692	58 Ophiuchi	Ophiuchius		56.0 ± 0.1	4.86	F5V
693		Pavo		19.208 ± 0.005	10.78	M3V
694.1	Psi1 Draconis	Draco		A:74.5 ± 0.8 B:75.2 ± 0.9	A:4.58 B:5.82	F5IV-V + F8V	Bb
695	Mu Herculis	Hercules		27.16 ± 0.02	3.42/10.2/10.7	G5IV + M4V + M3.5V + M3.5V
699	Barnard's Star	Ophiuchus		5.9629 ± 0.0004	9.511	M4.0V	d b c e

== 700-800 ==
Gliese/GJ Number	Other Name	Constellation	Right ascension Declination	Distance (ly)	App. mag.	Spectral type	Planet
700	HD 164427	Pavo		125 ± 1	6.88	G0+V
700.2	HD 164922	Hercules		71.69 ± 0.03	6.99	G9V	d e c b
702	70 Ophiuchi	Ophiuchus		A:16.68 ± 0.02 B:16.707 ± 0.009	A:4.13 B:6.07	K0V + K4V
702.1	HD 165185	Sagittarius		55.82 ± 0.04	5.94	G1V
704	99 Herculis	Hercules		51.0 ± 0.3	A:5.10 B:8.45	F7V + K4V
706	HD 166620	Hercules		36.190 ± 0.006	6.40	K2V
710		Serpens		62.25 ± 0.02	9.66	K7 Vk
711	Eta Serpentis	Serpens		60.5 ± 0.2	3.260	K0III-IV
713	Chi Draconis	Draco		27.17 ± 0.03	A:3.68 B:5.67	F7V + K0V
716	HD 170657	Sagittarius		42.93 ± 0.03	6.81	K2V
717	BD−11 4672	Scutum		88.74 ± 0.04	9.99 ± 0.5	K7 V	b c
719	BY Draconis	Draco		53.8 ± 0.2	8.07	K4Ve + K7.5Ve + M5
721	Vega (Alpha Lyrae)	Lyra		25.04 ± 0.07	-0.026	A0Va	b (unconfirmed)
722	HD 172051	Sagittarius		42.56 ± 0.06	5.85	G5V
725	Struve 2398	Draco		A:11.4908 ± 0.0009, B:11.491 ± 0.001	A:8.94, B:9.70	M3 V + M3.5 V	Ab
729	Ross 154	Sagittarius		9.7063 ± 0.0009	10.44	M3.5
736	HD 175541 (Kaveh)	Serpens		427 ± 1	8.02	G6/8IV	b (Kavian)
738	HD 176051	Lyra		48.5 ± 0.3	5.20	G0V + K1V	b
742	GRW +70 8247	Draco	19^{h} 00^{m} 10.2534^{s}	42.00 ± 0.02	13.19	DAP4.5
744	HD 177565	Corona Australis		55.29 ± 0.04	6.16	G6V	b
749	HD 179949 (Gumala)	Sagittarius		89.82 ± 0.09	6.25	F8V	b (Mastika)
752 A	HD 180617	Aquila		19.292 ± 0.003	9.12	M2.5V	Ab
752 B	VB 10	Aquila		19.304 ± 0.008	17.30	M8.0V
754		Telescopium		19.272 ± 0.007	12.25	M4V
754.2	HD 181655	Lyra		79.4 ± 1.5	6.29	G5V + G5V
756.1	HD 181433	Pavo		88.03 ± 0.05	8.40	K3III-IV	b c d
758		Lyra		50.91 ± 0.01	6.36	G8V + T7
759	31 Aquilae	Aquila		48.67 ± 0.05	5.16	G8IV
760	Delta Aquilae (Guqi)	Aquila		50.6 ± 0.8	3.365	F0IV + K
764	Alsafi (Sigma Draconis)	Draco		18.799 ± 0.008	4.675	K0V
765	Theta Cygni	Cygnus		60.10 ± 0.10	A:4.49 B:13.03	F3V + M3V
765.1	16 Cygni	Cygnus		A:68.92 ± 0.03 B:68.91 ± 0.02 C:68.9 ± 0.2	A:5.96 B:6.20	G1.5Vb + G2.5Vb + M?V	Bb
768	Altair (Alpha Aquilae)	Aquila		16.73 ± 0.05	0.76	A7Vn
770	HR 7578	Sagittarius		46.03 ± 0.01	6.18	K3V + K3V + M5
771	Beta Aquilae (Alshain)	Aquila		44.36 ± 0.09	A:3.87 B:12.0	G9.5IV + M2.5V
775	HD 190007	Aquila		41.47 ± 0.01	7.46	K5V	b
776	HD 189567	Pavo		58.49 ± 0.03	6.07	G3V	b c
777		Cygnus		A:52.2 ± 0.3 B:52.16 ± 0.02	A:5.73 B:14.4	A: G6IV B:M4.5V	b c d
779	15 Sagittae	Sagitta		57.960 ± 0.010	5.80	G0V + L4
780	Delta Pavonis	Pavo		19.89 ± 0.01	3.56	G8IV
781	Wolf 1130	Cygnus		AB:54.09 ± 0.02 C:61 ± 3	13.88	sdM3 + WD + (e)sdT6:
783	HR 7703	Sagittarius		19.61 ± 0.01	A:5.31 B:11.50	K2.5V + M4V
784		Telescopium		20.106 ± 0.003	7.96	M0V	b (unconfirmed)
785	HD 192310	Capricornus		28.74 ± 0.01	5.73	K2+V	b c
788	HD 193664	Draco		57.02 ± 0.02	5.93	G3V
789	HD 194012	Delphinus		84.93 ± 0.05	6.15	F7V
791.2	HU Delphini	Delphinus		28.76 ± 0.05	13.07	M4.5V
792.1	HD 195564	Capricornus		80.68 ± 0.10	5.65	G2.5IV
794	Wolf 1346	Vulpecula		48.39 ± 0.03	11.546	DA2.4
794.2	Phi2 Pavonis	Pavo		80.4 ± 0.5	5.10	G0 V Fe-0.8 CH-0.5
796	HD 196761	Capricornus		48	6.37	G8V
799	AT Microscopii	Microscopium		35 ± 1	11.0/11.1	M4Ve + M4.5Ve

== 800-900 ==
Gliese/GJ Number	Other Name	Constellation	Right ascension Declination	Distance (ly)	App. mag.	Spectral type	Planet
803	AU Microscopii	Microscopium		31.683 ± 0.007	8.73	M1Ve	b c d
805	Psi Capricorni	Capricornus		47.7 ± 0.1	4.13	F5V
806		Cygnus		39.348 ± 0.008	10.79	dM1.5	b c
806.1	Epsilon Cygni (Aljanah)	Cygnus		72.7 ± 0.2	2.480	K0III
807	Eta Cephei	Cepheus		46.86 ± 0.09	3.426	K0IV
809	HD 199305	Cepheus		22.960 ± 0.003	8.55	M2V
818	HD 200779	Equuleus		49.07 ± 0.02	8.27	K6V
820	61 Cygni	Cygnus		11.404 ± 0.001	A:5.21 B:6.03	K5V+K7V
822	Delta Equulei (Tepennekhet)	Equuleus		59.9 ± 0.2	A:5.19 B:5.22	F7V + F7V
822.1	Tau Cygni (Enduri Senggu)	Cygnus		66.3 ± 0.5	A:3.80 B:6.69	F2IV + G0V
825	Lacaille 8760	Microscopium		12.947 ± 0.002	6.67	M0Ve
825.2	HD 202628	Microscopium		77.61 ± 0.04	6.74	G1.5V
826	Alpha Cephei (Alderamin)	Cepheus		49.05 ± 0.08	2.46	A7IV-V
827	Gamma Pavonis	Pavo		30.20 ± 0.03	4.22	F9 V Fe-1.4 CH-0.7
829		Pegasus		22.113 ± 0.004	10.35	M3.0Ve
831	Wolf 922	Capricornus		26.03 ± 0.06	A:12.66 B:14.76	M4.0V + M?V
832		Grus		16.200 ± 0.002	8.66	M2V	b
835.1	Nu Octantis	Octans		73.5 ± 0.68	3.73	K1IV + Wd	b
836.7	HN Pegasi	Pegasus		59.14 ± 0.04	5.92 - 5.95	G0 V CH–0.5 + T2.5
837	Deneb Algedi (Delta Capricorni)	Capricornus		38.70 ± 0.09	2.81-3.05	kA5hF0mF2III
838	HD 207129	Grus		50.75 ± 0.03	5.57	G2V
841.1	HD 208527	Pegasus		1,080 ± 20	6.39	M1III	b
845	Epsilon Indi	Indus		11.867 ± 0.004	4.68	K5V + T1 + T6	Ab
848	Iota Pegasi (Jiu)	Pegasus		38.5 ± 0.2	A:3.84 B:6.68	F5V + G8V
848.2	Alpha Gruis (Alnair)	Grus		101.0 ± 0.7	1.74	B6V
849		Aquarius		28.750 ± 0.008	10.41	M3.5V	b c
853	HD 211415	Grus		45.88 ± 0.04	A:5.40 B:9.70	G0V + M?V
855.1	Nu Indi	Indus		92.8 ± 0.2	5.28	G9V Fe-3.1CH-1.5
859	53 Aquarii	Aquarius		66 ± 2	A:6.35 B:6.57	G1V + G5V Fe–0.8 CH–1
860	Kruger 60	Cepheus		A:13.078 ± 0.009 B:13.05 ± 0.04	A:9.93 B:11.4	M3V + M4V
863.2	Upsilon Aquarii	Aquarius		75.1 ± 0.1	5.21	F7V
866	EZ Aquarii	Aquarius		11.11 ± 0.03	13.03/13.27/15.07	M5V + M?V + M?V
872	Xi Pegasi (Tugongli)	Pegasus		53.2 ± 0.2	A:4.195 B:11.70	F6V + M3.5V
873	EV Lacertae	Lacerta		16.476 ± 0.002	10.26	M3.5V
876		Aquarius		15.238 ± 0.003	10.1920	M4V	b c d e
877		Octans		28.041 ± 0.004	10.377	M3V
879	TW Piscis Austrini (Fomalhaut B)	Piscis Austrinus		24.793 ± 0.005	5.44–6.51	K5Vp
880	HD 216899	Pegasus		22.397 ± 0.004	8.64	M1.5V
881	Formalhaut A (Alpha Piscis Austrini)	Piscis Austrinus		25.13 ± 0.09	1.16	A4V
882	51 Pegasi (Helvetios)	Pegasus		50.64 ± 0.04	5.46	G2V+	b (Dimidium)
886.1	2 Andromedae	Andromeda		420 ± 30	A:5.26 B:7.43	A1V + F1V/F4V
887	Lacaille 9352	Piscis Austrinus		10.7241 ± 0.0007	7.34	M0.5V	e b c d
890	HK Aquarii	Aquarius		81.25 ± 0.09	10.99	M0Ve
892	HD 219134	Cassiopeia		21.336 ± 0.007	5.574	K3V	b c d f g h
893.2	91 Aquarii (Psi1 Aquarii)	Aquarius		147.6 ± 0.9	4.248	K1III	b
894.1	94 Aquarii	Aquarius		A:72.6 ± 0.9 B:73.27 ± 0.09	A:5.19 B:7.52	G8.5IV + K?V + K2V
896	EQ Pegasi	Pegasus		A:20.428 ± 0.004 B:20.396 ± 0.007	A:10.35 B:12.4	M3Ve + M4Ve	Ab

== 900-1000 ==
Gliese/GJ Number	Other Name	Constellation	Right ascension Declination	Distance (ly)	App. mag.	Spectral type	Planet
900		Pisces		68.00 ± 0.03	9.546	K5-7V + M3-4V + M5-6V	b
902	HD 222237	Tucana		37.329 ± 0.008	7.09	K3+V	b
903	Gamma Cephei (Errai)	Cepheus		44.98 ± 0.09	3.21	K1III-IV CN1 + M4V	Ab (Tadmor)
904	Iota Piscium	Pisces		44.73 ± 0.09	4.13	F7 V
905	Ross 248	Andromeda		10.306 ± 0.001	12.23 - 12.34	M6 V
908		Pisces		19.275 ± 0.003	8.93 - 9.03	M1V Fe-1
909	HR 9038	Cepheus		35.5 ± 0.1	6.40 (6.93 / 7.33) / 11.4	K3 V + K3 V + M2
914	85 Pegasi	Pegasus		39.5 ± 0.4	5.75 / 8.89	G5IV + K6-8V
915	WD 2359−434	Phoenix		27.176 ± 0.005	12.76	DAP5.8

== See also ==
- Gliese Catalogue of Nearby Stars
- Lists of astronomical objects
- Lists of stars
- List of nearest stars
- List of exoplanets
- List of astronomical catalogues
