= Gliese 829 =

Star system in the constellation Pegasus

Observation data Epoch J2000.0 Equinox J2000.0 (ICRS)
- Constellation: Pegasus
- Right ascension: 21^{h} 29^{m} 36.81197^{s}
- Declination: +17° 38′ 35.8655″
- Apparent magnitude (V): 10.35

Characteristics
- Spectral type: M3.0Ve
- U−B color index: +1.31
- B−V color index: +1.61

Astrometry
Radial velocity (R_{v})	−25.0 km/s
Proper motion (μ)	RA: +1007.040 mas/yr Dec.: +378.400 mas/yr
Parallax (π)	147.4958±0.0257 mas
Distance	22.113 ± 0.004 ly (6.780 ± 0.001 pc)
Absolute magnitude (M_{V})	+11.20

Orbit
Period (P)	53.221±0.004 d
Eccentricity (e)	0.374±0.004
Periastron epoch (T)	48980.2±0.2 JD
Argument of periastron (ω) (secondary)	300±1°
Semi-amplitude (K_{1}) (primary)	18.7±0.1 km/s
Semi-amplitude (K_{2}) (secondary)	18.7±0.1 km/s

Details
Surface gravity (log g)	5.0 cgs
Temperature	3,400 K
Metallicity [Fe/H]	−0.13 dex

Other designations
- GJ 829, HIP 106106, G 145-40, G 126-4, LFT 1634, LHS 508, LTT 16285, PLX 5177, Ross 775

Database references
SIMBAD	data
ARICNS	data

Gliese 829 is a double-lined spectroscopic binary system of two red dwarf stars in the constellation of Pegasus. They have a high proper motion of 1.08 arc seconds per year along a position angle of +69.58°. Based upon parallax measurements, the stars are at a distance of 22.1 light-years from the Sun. The system will make its closest approach to the Sun around 91,000 years from now when it achieves a perihelion distance of 17.65 ly (5.410 pc).

== Characteristics ==
The primary star has a temperature of 3400 K. It is an M3.0Ve star with a B-V color index of 1.61 and it is also called Ross 775. It has an apparent magnitude of 10.35.
