= HR 4098 =

Binary star system in the constellation Ursa Major

Observation data Epoch J2000 Equinox ICRS
- Constellation: Ursa Major
- A
- Right ascension: 10^{h} 28^{m} 03.88293^{s}
- Declination: +48° 47′ 05.6436″
- Apparent magnitude (V): 6.45
- B
- Right ascension: 10^{h} 28^{m} 04.03128^{s}
- Declination: +48° 47′ 09.5442″
- Apparent magnitude (V): 6.45

Characteristics
- Evolutionary stage: main sequence
- Spectral type: G0V

Astrometry

HD 90508A
| Radial velocity (R_{v}) | 7.2±0.2 km/s |
| Proper motion (μ) | RA: 83.79±0.03 mas/yr Dec.: -896.055±0.04 mas/yr |
| Parallax (π) | 43.4944±0.0386 mas |
| Distance | 74.99 ± 0.07 ly (22.99 ± 0.02 pc) |

HD 90508B
| Proper motion (μ) | RA: +81.80±0.03 mas/yr Dec.: −880.66±0.03 mas/yr |
| Parallax (π) | 43.4822±0.0452 mas |
| Distance | 75.01 ± 0.08 ly (23.00 ± 0.02 pc) |

Orbit
| Primary | HD 90508A |
| Name | HD 90508B |
| Period (P) | 590±208 yr |
| Semi-major axis (a) | 4.67±0.12" (107 AU) |
| Eccentricity (e) | 0 |
| Inclination (i) | 81.4±3.5° |
| Longitude of the node (Ω) | 16.5±1.9° |
| Periastron epoch (T) | 1958.6±16.8 |

Details

HD 90508A
| Mass | 0.86±0.03 M_{☉} |
| Radius | 1.12±0.03 R_{☉} |
| Surface gravity (log g) | 4.3±0.1 cgs |
| Temperature | 5720±100 K |
| Metallicity [Fe/H] | −0.23 dex |
| Rotation | 18.0±2.7 d |
| Rotational velocity (v sin i) | 1.0 km/s |
| Age | 10.5±2 Gyr |

HD 90508B
| Mass | 0.25±0.01 M_{☉} |

Other designations
- BD+49 1961, GJ 392, HD 90508, HIP 51248, HR 4098, WDS J10281+4847, GSC 08176-00283, 2MASS J10280388+4847067
- HD 90508A: TYC 8176-283-1, LHS 2267, LTT 12795, NLTT 24398
- HD 90508B: LHS 2266, NLTT 24397

Database references
| SIMBAD | data |
- A
- B

HR 4098, also known as HD 90508, is a binary star system in the northern constellation of Ursa Major at a distance of 75 light years. This object is barely visible to the naked eye as a dim, yellow star with an apparent visual magnitude of 6.45. It is approaching the Earth with a heliocentric radial velocity of 7.2±0.2 km/s.

The star system is a visual binary with a 3.466 seconds of arc projected separation, identified as such in 1994–1997. The orbit of the binary is wide and highly uncertain due to the long period and high inclination.

The larger star, HD 90508A, is a very old main-sequence star approaching a turn-off from the main sequence. Very little dust remains in the stellar system, therefore the starlight of HR 4098 is one of the standards for non-polarized emission, polarization being below 0.2% in all bands. Unlike the majority of G-class stars, HD 90508A has a direct correlation between brightness and stellar activity. This behavior is shared with HD 88986 and the Sun.

Very little is known about the companion, which could be a K-class or M-class dwarf star.
