= HD 27274 =

Star in the constellation Dorado

Observation data Epoch J2000.0 Equinox ICRS
- Constellation: Dorado
- Right ascension: 04^{h} 15^{m} 56.90154^{s}
- Declination: −53° 18′ 35.3067″
- Apparent magnitude (V): 7.63

Characteristics
- Evolutionary stage: main sequence
- Spectral type: K4.5 Vk:
- U−B color index: +1.08
- B−V color index: +1.12

Astrometry
Radial velocity (R_{v})	−23.4±0.3 km/s
Proper motion (μ)	RA: +784.529 mas/yr Dec.: +396.695 mas/yr
Parallax (π)	76.6638±0.0146 mas
Distance	42.544 ± 0.008 ly (13.044 ± 0.002 pc)
Absolute magnitude (M_{V})	+7.06

Details
Mass	0.73±0.09 M_{☉}
Radius	0.70±0.05 R_{☉}
Luminosity	19.6±0.5% L_{☉}
Surface gravity (log g)	4.64 cgs
Temperature	4,602±80 K
Metallicity [Fe/H]	+0.16±0.01 dex
Rotational velocity (v sin i)	1 km/s
Age	4.5 Gyr

Other designations
- CD−53° 889, CPD−53° 672, GC 5176, GJ 167, HD 27274, HIP 19884, SAO 233456

Database references
SIMBAD	data
ARICNS	data

HD 27274, also known as Gliese 167, is a solitary, orange hued star located in the southern constellation Dorado. It has an apparent magnitude of 7.63, making it readily visible in binoculars, but not to the naked eye. Based on parallax measurements from the Gaia spacecraft, the star is known to be located 42.5 light-years (13.02 parsecs) away from the Solar System However, it is drifting closer with a heliocentric radial velocity of −23 km/s. At its current distance, HD 27274 is dimmed down by 0.05 magnitudes due to interstellar dust.

HD 27274 has a stellar classification of K4.5 Vk:, indicating that it is a K-type main-sequence star with interstellar absorption features. However, there is uncertainty behind the classification. At present it has 73% the mass of the Sun and 70% of its radius. It has an effective temperature of 4,602 K, but its small size yields a luminosity only 19.6% that of the Sun. HD 27274 is metal enriched, having an iron abundance 44.6% above solar levels. The star spins with a projected rotational velocity of 1 km/s, and is estimated to be 4.5 billion years old. This is similar to the Sun's current age (4.6 Gyr).
