= HD 104304 =

Binary star in the constellation Virgo

Observation data Epoch J2000 Equinox ICRS
- Constellation: Virgo
- Right ascension: 12^{h} 00^{m} 44.461^{s}
- Declination: −10° 26′ 46.06″
- Apparent magnitude (V): 5.54

Characteristics
- Spectral type: G8 IV + M4V
- U−B color index: +0.43
- B−V color index: +0.76

Astrometry
Radial velocity (R_{v})	0.14±0.14 km/s
Proper motion (μ)	RA: +82.841 mas/yr Dec.: −482.807 mas/yr
Parallax (π)	78.7565±0.1206 mas
Distance	41.41 ± 0.06 ly (12.70 ± 0.02 pc)
Absolute magnitude (M_{V})	5.15±0.009

Orbit
Period (P)	92.9+4.8 −4.2 yr
Semi-major axis (a)	22.85+0.87 −0.79 AU
Eccentricity (e)	0.400±0.025
Inclination (i)	25.93+0.68 −0.58°

Details

A
Mass	1.061±0.053 M_{☉}
Radius	1.01 R_{☉}
Surface gravity (log g)	4.43 cgs
Temperature	5,538 K
Metallicity [Fe/H]	0.18 dex
Rotational velocity (v sin i)	4.5 km/s
Age	8.48 Gyr

B
Mass	0.321+0.014 −0.013 M_{☉}

Other designations
- 24 G. Virginis, BD−09°3413, GJ 454, HD 104304, HIP 58576, HR 4587, SAO 157041, LTT 4476

Database references
SIMBAD	data

HD 104304 (24 G. Virginis) is a binary star system in the zodiac constellation Virgo. It has a combined apparent visual magnitude of 5.54, making it visible to the unaided eye under suitable viewing conditions. The system is located at a distance of 41 light-years from the Sun based on parallax measurements. The primary component has a stellar classification of G8 IV, which means that this is a subgiant star that has left the main sequence and has begun to evolve into a giant star. The secondary is a faint red dwarf star with a class of M4V.

In 2007, a candidate planet was announced orbiting the primary. This was updated in 2010 when two independent papers announced the discovery of a common proper motion companion red dwarf. It has a mass of 0.321 M_{☉} and spectral type of M4V although the spectrum has not been directly observed. The components orbit around the center of mass with a period of 92.9 years and an eccentricity of 0.400. Further measurement will be needed to determine whether the star has a planetary companion, but further companions with masses above 83 M_{J} and separated by at least 3.9 au can be ruled out.
