= HR 244 =

Star in the constellation Cassiopeia

- Location of HR 244 (circled in red)

Observation data Epoch J2000 Equinox ICRS
- Constellation: Cassiopeia
- Right ascension: 00^{h} 53^{m} 04.19644^{s}
- Declination: +61° 07′ 26.2993″
- Apparent magnitude (V): 4.80

Characteristics
- Evolutionary stage: subgiant
- Spectral type: F9V
- B−V color index: 0.540±0.008

Astrometry
Radial velocity (R_{v})	+20.68±0.12 km/s
Proper motion (μ)	RA: –68.298 mas/yr Dec.: +169.435 mas/yr
Parallax (π)	52.9017±0.1037 mas
Distance	61.7 ± 0.1 ly (18.90 ± 0.04 pc)
Absolute magnitude (M_{V})	3.44

Details
Mass	1.194 M_{☉}
Radius	1.77 R_{☉}
Luminosity	3.7 L_{☉}
Surface gravity (log g)	0.53 cgs
Temperature	5,986 K
Metallicity [Fe/H]	0.04 dex
Rotational velocity (v sin i)	8.1 km/s
Age	5.3 Gyr

Other designations
- BD+60°124, GJ 41, HD 5015, HIP 4151, HR 244, SAO 11444, WDS J00531+6107A

Database references
SIMBAD	data

HR 244 is a single star in the constellation Cassiopeia. It has a yellow-white hue and is visible to the naked eye with an apparent visual magnitude of 4.80. Based upon parallax measurements, it is located at a distance of 62 light years from the Sun, and is drifting further away with a radial velocity of +20.7 km/s; around 546,000 years ago it passed within 38 light-years of the Sun. The star has a relatively high proper motion, traversing the celestial sphere at the rate of 0.183 arcseconds per annum.

This object is an F-type star with a stellar classification of F9V. Despite the spectral class, evolutionary models show it to have left the main sequence and is now a subgiant. It is 5.3 billion years old and is spinning with a projected rotational velocity of 8 km/s. The star has 1.2 times the mass of the Sun and 1.8 times the Sun's radius. It is radiating 3.7 times the luminosity of the Sun from its photosphere at an effective temperature of 5,986 K.
