= HD 200779 =

High proper motion star; Equuleus

Observation data Epoch J2000.0 Equinox ICRS
- Constellation: Equuleus
- Right ascension: 21^{h} 05^{m} 19.74605^{s}
- Declination: +07° 04′ 09.4729″
- Apparent magnitude (V): 8.27

Characteristics
- Spectral type: K6 V
- U−B color index: +1.12
- B−V color index: +1.21
- R−I color index: +0.61

Astrometry
Radial velocity (R_{v})	−66.94±0.18 km/s
Proper motion (μ)	RA: +78.562 mas/yr Dec.: −563.909 mas/yr
Parallax (π)	66.4626±0.0225 mas
Distance	49.07 ± 0.02 ly (15.046 ± 0.005 pc)
Absolute magnitude (M_{V})	+7.38

Details
Mass	0.68±0.01 M_{☉}
Radius	0.689^{+0.077}_{−0.050} R_{☉}
Luminosity	0.18 L_{☉}
Surface gravity (log g)	4.67±0.02 cgs
Temperature	4,406±73 K
Metallicity [Fe/H]	+0.05±0.06 dex
Rotational velocity (v sin i)	5.1±1.2 km/s
Age	6.33 Gyr

Other designations
- AG+06°2882, BD+06°4741, GC 29447, GJ 818, HD 200779, HIP 104092, SAO 126533, CCDM J21054+0704A, WDS J21053+0704A, LFT 160, LHS 3624, LTT 16169

Database references
SIMBAD	data
ARICNS	data

HD 200779 (HIP 104092; Gliese 818; LHS 3624) is a solitary star located in the equatorial constellation Equuleus, the foal. It has an apparent magnitude of 8.27, making it readily visible in binoculars but not to the naked eye. The object is located relatively close at a distance of 49 light-years based on Gaia DR3 parallax measurements, which makes it the nearest star in Equuleus. It is the most distant star that is the nearest in its constellation. It is classified as a high proper motion star, with a total proper motion of 569 mas/yr.

At its current distance, HD 200779's brightness is diminished by only six hundredths of a magnitude due to interstellar dust and it has an absolute magnitude of +7.38. HD 200779 is expected to come within 7.76 parsecs (25.3 ly) of the Solar System in roughly 160,000 years.

HD 200779 is an ordinary K-type main-sequence star with a stellar classification of K6 V. It has 68% the mass of the Sun and 69% of its radius. However, it only radiates 18% the luminosity of the Sun from its photosphere at an effective temperature of 4,406 K, giving it an orange hue. It has an iron abundance slightly above solar level at [Fe/H] = +0.05 and it is estimated to be 6.33 billion years old. HD 200779 spins modestly with a projected rotational velocity of 5.1 km/s. The star is generally considered to be chromospherically active.

HD 200779 has two optical companions: a distant 11th magnitude star located 64.6" away and a 9th magnitude star located 169.4" away.
