= HD 4747 =

Binary star in the constellation Cetus

Observation data Epoch J2000.0 Equinox ICRS
- Constellation: Cetus
- Right ascension: 00^{h} 49^{m} 26.76537^{s}
- Declination: −23° 12′ 44.9359″
- Apparent magnitude (V): 7.155

Characteristics
- Spectral type: G8V + L9
- B−V color index: 0.769

Astrometry
Radial velocity (R_{v})	9.893 ± 0.016 km/s
Proper motion (μ)	RA: 516.92±0.55 mas/yr Dec.: 120.05±0.45 mas/yr
Parallax (π)	53.51±0.53 mas
Distance	61.0 ± 0.6 ly (18.7 ± 0.2 pc)
Absolute magnitude (M_{V})	5.79

Orbit
Period (P)	33.48±0.41 yr
Semi-major axis (a)	10.15+0.17 −0.16 AU
Eccentricity (e)	0.7319±0.0014
Inclination (i)	49.50±0.92°
Longitude of the node (Ω)	89.4±1.1°
Periastron epoch (T)	JD 2462615±155
Argument of periastron (ω) (secondary)	267.2±0.5°
Semi-amplitude (K_{1}) (primary)	0.7553+0.0124 −0.0116 km/s

Details

HD 4747A
Mass	0.85 ± 0.014 M_{☉}
Radius	0.769 ± 0.016 R_{☉}
Luminosity	0.45 ± 0.02 (log -0.346 ± 0.04) L_{☉}
Surface gravity (log g)	4.60 ± 0.15 cgs
Temperature	5400 ± 60 K
Metallicity [Fe/H]	-0.23 ± 0.05 dex
Rotation	27.7 ± 0.5
Rotational velocity (v sin i)	2 ± 1 km/s km/s
Age	2.3 ± 1.4 Gyr

HD 4747B
Mass	68.7+1.5 −1.4 M_{Jup}

Other designations
- CD−23 315, GJ 36, HIP 3850, SAO 166607

Database references
SIMBAD	data

HD 4747 is a star that lies approximately 61 light-years away in the constellation of Cetus. The star is a low-amplitude spectroscopic binary, with the secondary being a directly detected brown dwarf.

== Binarity ==
The binarity of HD 4747 was announced in 2002, based on observations with the HIRES spectrograph at the W. M. Keck Observatory. The radial velocity variation caused by the companion was found to have a semi-amplitude of approximately 0.65 km/s, which evaded detection by earlier spectrographs due to their precision being poorer than about 1 km/s, but was easily detectable by the 3 m/s precision of HIRES. With a period of 6832 ± 653 days (the large error due to the orbit being unclosed over 1731 day span of observations) and an eccentricity of 0.64 ± 0.06, assuming a primary mass of 0.83 M_{☉} led to a minimum secondary mass of 42.3 M_{J} - well within the brown dwarf regime. HD 4747 B became one of the few brown dwarf candidates orbiting within a few AU of any type of star.

An updated orbital solution was provided in 2010, based on observations with the CORALIE spectrograph. With a 3068-day extension to the radial velocity time series, the orbital period was found to be about twice as long as previously thought due to an increase in the fitted eccentricity. The minimum mass of the companion was increased slightly to 46.1 ± 2.3 M_{J}, remaining in the brown dwarf regime.

In 2013 an attempt to directly image the secondary using adaptive optics imaging at the W. M. Keck Observatory resulted in a non-detection, thus effectively eliminating the possibility of the companion being a low inclination stellar binary. A follow-up attempt in 2014 resulted in a candidate source that together with additional images taken in 2015 confirmed the companion as having common proper motion and also showed orbital motion in a counter-clockwise direction.

== HD 4747B ==
Photometry indicates that HD 4747B is most likely a L-type brown dwarf and may possibly be close to the transition between L and T-types. A preliminary dynamical mass was found to be 67.2±1.8 times the mass of Jupiter.
