= Mu Fornacis =

Star in the constellation Fornax

Observation data Epoch J2000.0 Equinox J2000.0 (ICRS)
- Constellation: Fornax
- Right ascension: 02^{h} 12^{m} 54.46962^{s}
- Declination: −30° 43′ 25.7732″
- Apparent magnitude (V): 5.27

Characteristics
- Evolutionary stage: main sequence
- Spectral type: A0 V
- U−B color index: −0.06
- B−V color index: −0.02

Astrometry
Radial velocity (R_{v})	10.0±3.7 km/s
Proper motion (μ)	RA: +14.10 mas/yr Dec.: +6.85 mas/yr
Parallax (π)	10.18±0.24 mas
Distance	320 ± 8 ly (98 ± 2 pc)
Absolute magnitude (M_{V})	+0.31

Details
Mass	2.55±0.34 M_{☉}
Radius	2.9±0.1 R_{☉}
Luminosity	75±4 L_{☉}
Surface gravity (log g)	3.92±0.06 cgs
Temperature	9,977±136 K
Rotational velocity (v sin i)	320 km/s
Age	188 Myr

Other designations
- μ For, CD−31°882, FK5 78, GJ 89, HD 13709, HIP 10320, HR 652, SAO 193573

Database references
SIMBAD	data

μ Fornacis (Latinised as Mu Fornacis) is a star in the southern constellation of Fornax. With an apparent visual magnitude of 5.27, it is visible to the naked eye. The distance to this star, as determined by its annual parallax shift of 10.18 mas, is around 320 light years.

This is an A-type main sequence star with a stellar classification of A0 V. It is a Be star that displays "central quasi emission" (CQE) bumps in its spectrum due to a surrounding shell of material. The star has an estimated 2.6 times the mass of the Sun and 2.9 times the Sun's radius. Mu Fornacis is spinning rapidly with a projected rotational velocity of 320 km/s and is around 188 million years old. It radiates 75 times the solar luminosity from its outer atmosphere at an effective temperature of 9,977 K.

Mu Fornacis appears to be emitting an infrared excess at a wavelength of 22 μm, which could be due to an orbiting debris disk.
