= HD 121056 =

Star in the constellation Centaurus

Observation data Epoch J2000 Equinox ICRS
- Constellation: Centaurus
- Right ascension: 13^{h} 53^{m} 52.06131^{s}
- Declination: −35° 18′ 51.6918″
- Apparent magnitude (V): 6.17

Characteristics
- Evolutionary stage: red giant branch
- Spectral type: K0 III
- B−V color index: 1.01

Astrometry
Radial velocity (R_{v})	5.60±0.13 km/s
Proper motion (μ)	RA: −295.304 mas/yr Dec.: −68.458 mas/yr
Parallax (π)	15.6261±0.0418 mas
Distance	208.7 ± 0.6 ly (64.0 ± 0.2 pc)
Absolute magnitude (M_{V})	+2.08

Details
Mass	1.394±0.052 M_{☉}
Radius	5.948±0.077 R_{☉}
Luminosity	18.2+2.0 −1.8 L_{☉}
Surface gravity (log g)	3.034±0.005 cgs
Temperature	4,867±49 K
Metallicity	[Mg/H] 0.286±0.05 dex
Metallicity [Fe/H]	0.020±0.031 dex
Rotational velocity (v sin i)	2.38±0.51 km/s
Age	5.46 Gyr

Other designations
- CD−34 9223, GJ 532.1, HD 121056, HIP 67851, HR 5224, TYC 7287-1874-1, 2MASS J13535209-3518517

Database references
SIMBAD	data
Exoplanet Archive	data

HD 121056, or HIP 67851, is an aging giant star with a pair of orbiting exoplanets located in the southern constellation of Centaurus. This star is dimly visible to the naked eye with an apparent visual magnitude of 6.17. It is located at a distance of 209 light-years from the Sun, based on parallax measurements, and is drifting further away with a radial velocity of 5.6 km/s.

The spectrum of HD 121056 presents as an evolved K-type giant star with a stellar classification of K0 III. It is presently ascending the red-giant branch, having exhausted the supply of hydrogen at its core. The star is about 5.5 billion years old and is spinning with a projected rotational velocity of 2.4 km/s. HD 121056's concentration of heavy elements is similar to the Sun, with a metallicity Fe/H index of 0.020±0.031, although the star is enriched in lighter rock-forming elements like magnesium and aluminum. It has 1.6 times the mass of the Sun and has expanded to 5.72 times the Sun's radius. The star is radiating 15.8 times the luminosity of the Sun from its enlarged photosphere at an effective temperature of 4,867 K.

== Planetary system ==
In 2014, two planets orbiting HD 121056 were discovered by the radial velocity method, and were confirmed a few months later. The orbits of these planets are stable on astronomical timescales, although the periods are not in orbital resonance. In 2022, the inclination and true mass of HD 121056 c were measured via astrometry, indicating a nearly edge-on orbit. Subsequent studies have provided further updates to the planetary parameters.

The planetary system configuration is favorable for direct imaging of exoplanets in the near future, being included in the top ten easiest targets in 2018.

The HD 121056 planetary system (Note: Most parameters are taken from the most recent study of the system, Fontanet et al. 2025. This does not incorporate astrometry, hence the mass of planet c is technically a minimum mass, but since the inclination measured by Feng et al. 2022 is nearly edge-on, the true mass is about the same as this value.)
Companion (in order from star)	Mass	Semimajor axis (AU)	Orbital period (days)	Eccentricity	Inclination (°)	Radius
b	≥1.15±0.04 M_{J}	0.42±0.0002	89.23±0.06	0.13±0.04	—	—
c	4.97+0.22 −0.21 M_{J}	4.55±0.05	3,128.41+52.09 −47.13	0.30±0.03	89.86+28.38 −24.73	—
