= 44 Andromedae =

Star in the constellation Andromeda

- Location of 44 Andromedae (circled)

Observation data Epoch J2000.0 Equinox J2000.0 (ICRS)
- Constellation: Andromeda
- Right ascension: 01^{h} 10^{m} 18.74041^{s}
- Declination: +42° 04′ 53.3100″
- Apparent magnitude (V): 5.67

Characteristics
- Evolutionary stage: subgiant
- Spectral type: F8 V
- U−B color index: +0.12
- B−V color index: +0.59

Astrometry
Radial velocity (R_{v})	−14.2±0.2 km/s
Proper motion (μ)	RA: −135.569(38) mas/yr Dec.: −41.790(30) mas/yr
Parallax (π)	18.8145±0.0376 mas
Distance	173.4 ± 0.3 ly (53.2 ± 0.1 pc)
Absolute magnitude (M_{V})	+2.07

Details
Mass	1.64 M_{☉}
Radius	3.58±0.19 R_{☉}
Luminosity	12.9 L_{☉}
Surface gravity (log g)	3.78±0.07 cgs
Temperature	6,028±32 K
Metallicity [Fe/H]	−0.01±0.04 dex
Rotation	15.2 d
Rotational velocity (v sin i)	11.6±0.8 km/s
Age	2.59 Gyr

Other designations
- 44 And, BD+41°219, FK5 2075, GC 1410, GJ 53.4, HD 6920, HIP 5493, HR 340, SAO 36984, PPM 43709

Database references
SIMBAD	data

44 Andromedae is a single, yellow-white hued star in the northern constellation of Andromeda. 44 Andromedae is the Flamsteed designation. It has an apparent visual magnitude of approximately 5.67, which indicates it is a dim star that is just visible to the naked eye on a dark night. The annual parallax shift as measured by the Gaia spacecraft is 18.8145 mas, which yields a distance estimate of around 173 light years. It is moving closer to the Sun with a radial velocity of −14 km/s.

This star has been assigned a stellar classification of F8 V, which indicates it is an ordinary F-type main-sequence star. However, Gray et al. (2001) gave it a class of F9 IV, suggesting it is instead a subgiant star that is evolving away from the main sequence as the hydrogen fuel at its core becomes exhausted. It is an estimated 2.6 billion years old and is rotating with a period of 15.2 days. The star has 1.64 times the mass of the Sun and 3.6 times the Sun's radius. It is radiating 13 times the Sun's luminosity from its photosphere at an effective temperature of 6,028 K. It appears overluminous for a star of its type which may indicate the presence of a bright companion, but no radial velocity variation has been detected.
