= HD 32450 =

Binary star in the constellation Lepus

Observation data Epoch J2000 Equinox ICRS
- Constellation: Lepus
- Right ascension: 05^{h} 02^{m} 28.42030^{s}
- Declination: −21° 15′ 23.9203″
- Apparent magnitude (V): 8.317 (8.66 / 10.60)

Characteristics
- Spectral type: K7V
- U−B color index: +1.15
- B−V color index: +1.42

Astrometry
Radial velocity (R_{v})	−11.00±0.38 km/s
Proper motion (μ)	RA: −143.42 mas/yr Dec.: −221.81 mas/yr
Parallax (π)	116.59±1.51 mas
Distance	28.0 ± 0.4 ly (8.6 ± 0.1 pc)
Absolute magnitude (M_{V})	+8.64

Orbit
Period (P)	43.55±0.27 yr
Semi-major axis (a)	1.062±0.049″
Eccentricity (e)	0.720±0.028
Inclination (i)	60.7±2.1°
Longitude of the node (Ω)	246.5±3.9°
Periastron epoch (T)	B 1997.46±0.86
Argument of periastron (ω) (secondary)	280.6±1.2°

Details

HD 32450 A
Mass	0.59 M_{☉}

HD 32450 B
Mass	0.37 M_{☉}

Other designations
- BD−21°1051, GJ 185, HIP 23452, SAO 170003, LTT 2151

Database references
SIMBAD	data
ARICNS	A
- B

HD 32450, also known as Gliese 185, is a binary star in the constellation Lepus. It is located about 28 light years from the Solar System. This star will make its closest approach to the Sun in roughly 350,000 years, when it comes within 14.8 ly (4.5 pc).

== See also ==
- List of star systems within 25–30 light-years
