= HD 122862 =

Star in the constellation of Apus

Observation data Epoch J2000.0 Equinox J2000.0 (ICRS)
- Constellation: Apus
- Right ascension: 14^{h} 08^{m} 27.1634^{s}
- Declination: −74° 51′ 01.033″
- Apparent magnitude (V): 6.02

Characteristics
- Spectral type: G2/3 IV
- U−B color index: +0.06
- B−V color index: +0.58

Astrometry
Radial velocity (R_{v})	−21.11±0.16 km/s
Proper motion (μ)	RA: −243.574 mas/yr Dec.: +179.540 mas/yr
Parallax (π)	34.1491±0.0256 mas
Distance	95.51 ± 0.07 ly (29.28 ± 0.02 pc)
Absolute magnitude (M_{V})	+3.75

Details
Mass	1.08^{+0.02}_{−0.01} M_{☉}
Radius	1.58^{+0.03}_{−0.05} R_{☉}
Luminosity	2.87±0.01 L_{☉}
Surface gravity (log g)	4.10±0.03 cgs
Temperature	5,943±50 K
Metallicity [Fe/H]	−0.15±0.04 dex
Rotational velocity (v sin i)	3.1±1 km/s
Age	6.83^{+0.39}_{−0.57} Gyr

Other designations
- 5 G. Apodis, CD−74°865, CPD−74°1142, GC 19036, GJ 539.1, HD 122862, HIP 69090, HR 5279, SAO 257116

Database references
SIMBAD	data

HD 122862 (HR 5279) is a solitary star in the southern circumpolar constellation Apus. It has an apparent magnitude of 6.02, allowing it to be faintly seen with the naked eye under ideal conditions. The star is relatively close at a distance of 95 light years, but is approaching the Sun with a radial velocity of −21.11 km/s.

HD 122862 is a G-type subgiant with 1.08 times the mass of the Sun and a diameter of 1.58 R_{☉}. It shines at 2.87 times the luminosity of the Sun from its photosphere at an effective temperature of 5,943 K, giving it a yellow glow. HD 122862 has an iron abundance 71% that of the Sun and, at an age of 6.83 billion years, it spins slowly with a projected rotational velocity of 3.1 km/s.
