= 6 Ceti =

Star in the constellation Cetus

- Location of 6 Ceti (circled in red)

Observation data Epoch J2000.0 Equinox ICRS
- Constellation: Cetus
- Right ascension: 00^{h} 11^{m} 15.85804^{s}
- Declination: −15° 28′ 04.7205″
- Apparent magnitude (V): 4.89

Characteristics
- Evolutionary stage: main sequence
- Spectral type: F8 V Fe−0.8 CH−0.5
- B−V color index: 0.487±0.012

Astrometry
| Radial velocity (R_{v}) | +16.70±0.08 km/s |
| Proper motion (μ) | RA: −82.828 mas/yr Dec.: −269.549 mas/yr |
| Parallax (π) | 52.9489±0.0958 mas |
| Distance | 61.6 ± 0.1 ly (18.89 ± 0.03 pc) |
| Absolute magnitude (M_{V}) | 3.53 |

Details
| Mass | 1.19 M_{☉} |
| Radius | 1.50 R_{☉} |
| Luminosity | 3.00 L_{☉} |
| Surface gravity (log g) | 4.16 cgs |
| Temperature | 6,192 K |
| Metallicity [Fe/H] | −0.33±0.06 dex |
| Rotational velocity (v sin i) | 4.88 km/s |
| Age | 4.2+0.8 −0.9 Gyr |

Other designations
- 6 Cet, BD−16°17, GJ 10, HD 693, HIP 910, HR 33, SAO 147133

Database references
| SIMBAD | data |

6 Ceti is a single star in the equatorial constellation of Cetus. It is visible to the naked eye with an apparent magnitude of 4.89. The annual parallax shift as measured from Earth's orbit is 53.34 mas, which yields a distance estimate of 61.1 light years. The star is moving further from the Sun with a constant radial velocity of +16.70 km/s. It is one of the IAU's standard velocity stars.

Gray et al. (2006) assigned this star a stellar classification of F8 V Fe−0.8 CH−0.5, indicating it is an F-type main-sequence star with an underabundance of iron and the CH molecule in its stellar atmosphere. It is about 4.2 billion years old with 1.2 times the mass of the Sun and is spinning with a projected rotational velocity of 4.88 km/s. The star is radiating three times the Sun's luminosity from its photosphere at an effective temperature of about 6,192 K.
