= HD 181655 =

Star in the constellation Lyra

Observation data Epoch J2000 Equinox ICRS
- Constellation: Lyra
- Right ascension: 19^{h} 19^{m} 38.9987^{s}
- Declination: +37° 19′ 49.946″
- Apparent magnitude (V): +6.29

Characteristics
- Evolutionary stage: main sequence
- Spectral type: G5V + G5V
- B−V color index: 0.676±0.003

Astrometry
Radial velocity (R_{v})	+1.827±0.031 km/s
Proper motion (μ)	RA: −61.4 mas/yr Dec.: −183.7 mas/yr
Parallax (π)	41.08±0.77 mas
Distance	79.4 ± 1.5 ly (24.34±0.45 pc)
Absolute magnitude (M_{V})	+4.27

Orbit
Period (P)	331.609±0.0037 days
Semi-major axis (a)	(47.432±0.035)×10^{−3}" (1.156 au)
Eccentricity (e)	0.9322±0.00013
Inclination (i)	29.48±0.86°
Longitude of the node (Ω)	181.046±0.092°
Periastron epoch (T)	58,142.690±0.0027 HJD
Argument of periastron (ω) (secondary)	169.888±0.075°
Semi-amplitude (K_{1}) (primary)	25.555±0.047 km/s
Semi-amplitude (K_{2}) (secondary)	25.947±0.048 km/s

Details

A
Mass	0.941±0.076 M_{☉}
Radius	0.95 R_{☉}
Rotational velocity (v sin i)	2.6±1.0 km/s

B
Mass	0.926±0.075 M_{☉}
Radius	0.95 R_{☉}
Rotational velocity (v sin i)	2.6±1.0 km/s

Other designations
- BD+37°3417, GJ 754.2, GJ 9654, HD 181655, HIP 94981, HR 7345, TYC 2665-2093-1

Database references
SIMBAD	data

HD 181655 (HR 7345) is a binary star in the constellation Lyra. At an apparent magnitude of +6.29, it is very faintly visible to the naked eye in locations far from light pollution. Dynamical parallax measurements give a distance of 79.4 light-years (24.34 parsecs) light-years.

== Characteristics ==
This is a spectroscopic binary system with an orbital period of 331.609 days, a semi-major axis of 1.156 astronomical units and a very high orbital eccentricity of 0.9322, bringing the stars to 0.079 au at periastron. The source of such a high eccentricity may be a red dwarf separated by 35" from the inner pair, which excited the binary's eccentricity through the Kozai mechanism. The large eccentricity also hinders the spectral lines of both stars to be seen for most of the orbital path, so the system alternates between a single-lined and a double-lined spectroscopic binary. The double-line phase is observable for only 15 days per orbit.

The two components are similar to each other, each with a spectral type of G5V. The primary has a mass of 0.94 solar masses and the secondary has 0.93 solar masses, give or take 0.08 solar masses.
