= HR 9038 =

Ternary star system in the constellation Cepheus

HR 9038 AB
Observation data Epoch J2000 Equinox ICRS
- Constellation: Cepheus
- HR 9038 A
- Right ascension: 23^{h} 52^{m} 25.40913^{s}
- Declination: +75° 32′ 40.3549″
- Apparent magnitude (V): 6.40 (6.93 / 7.33)
- HR 9038 B
- Right ascension: 23^{h} 52^{m} 26.31841^{s}
- Declination: +75° 32′ 42.2862″
- Apparent magnitude (V): 11.4

Characteristics
- Spectral type: K3 V + K3 V + M2
- U−B color index: 0.70
- B−V color index: 0.98
- R−I color index: 0.5

Astrometry
| Radial velocity (R_{v}) | +4.60 km/s |
| Proper motion (μ) | RA: 309.900±0.052 mas/yr Dec.: 25.334±0.059 mas/yr |
| Parallax (π) | 91.7722±0.0425 mas |
| Distance | 35.54 ± 0.02 ly (10.897 ± 0.005 pc) |
| Absolute magnitude (M_{V}) | 6.77 / 7.16 / ? |
| Absolute bolometric magnitude (M_{bol}) | 6.34 / 6.62 / ? |

Orbit
| Primary | HR 9038 A |
| Name | HR 9038 B |
| Period (P) | 290.0 yr |
| Semi-major axis (a) | 4.14″ |
| Eccentricity (e) | 0.55 |
| Inclination (i) | 49.58° |
| Longitude of the node (Ω) | 93.91° |
| Periastron epoch (T) | 2015.0 |
| Argument of periastron (ω) (secondary) | 134.14° |

Orbit
| Primary | HR 9038 Aa |
| Name | HR 9038 Ab |
| Period (P) | 7.7531 d |
| Eccentricity (e) | 0.0 |
| Inclination (i) | ~60° |
| Periastron epoch (T) | 2420001.264 |
| Argument of periastron (ω) (secondary) | 0.0° |
| Semi-amplitude (K_{1}) (primary) | 39.9 km/s |
| Semi-amplitude (K_{2}) (secondary) | 49.7 km/s |

Details

HR 9038 Aa
| Mass | 0.70 M_{☉} |
| Radius | 0.69 R_{☉} |
| Surface gravity (log g) | 4.60 cgs |
| Temperature | 4820 K |
| Metallicity [Fe/H] | -0.29 dex |

HR 9038 Ab
| Mass | 0.67 M_{☉} |
| Radius | 0.66 R_{☉} |
| Surface gravity (log g) | 4.62 cgs |
| Temperature | 4620 K |
| Metallicity [Fe/H] | -0.29 dex |

Other designations
- BD+74° 1047, GJ 909, WDS J23524+7533
- HR 9038 A: HD 223778, HIP 117712, HR 9038, SAO 10879

Database references
| SIMBAD | A |
- B

HR 9038 is a triple star system located 35 light-years away, in the constellation Cepheus. Component A is a spectroscopic binary system with an orbital period of 7.753 days and a combined stellar classification of K3 V. Component B is a red dwarf star that orbits the primary pair every 290 years.
