= Gliese 809 =

Star in the constellation Cepheus

Observation data Epoch J2000 Equinox ICRS
- Constellation: Cepheus
- Right ascension: 20^{h} 53^{m} 19.78892^{s}
- Declination: +62° 09′ 15.8173″
- Apparent magnitude (V): 8.54

Characteristics
- Evolutionary stage: main sequence
- Spectral type: M2V

Astrometry
Radial velocity (R_{v})	−17.30±0.09 km/s
Proper motion (μ)	RA: 0.259 mas/yr Dec.: −773.096 mas/yr
Parallax (π)	142.0543±0.0160 mas
Distance	22.960 ± 0.003 ly (7.0396 ± 0.0008 pc)
Absolute magnitude (M_{V})	8.46

Details
Mass	0.54 M_{☉}
Radius	0.54 R_{☉}
Luminosity	0.05 L_{☉}
Surface gravity (log g)	4.72 cgs
Temperature	3,729 K
Metallicity [Fe/H]	−0.21 dex
Rotational velocity (v sin i)	2.8 km/s
Age	12.3 Gyr

Other designations
- BD+61°2068, GJ 809, HD 199305, HIP 103096

Database references
SIMBAD	data
ARICNS	data

Gliese 809 is a red dwarf star in the constellation Cepheus. A visual magnitude of 8.55 makes it too faint to see with the naked eye. It is part of the Gliese Catalogue of Nearby Stars and is located about 23 light-years (ly) from the Solar System. Gliese 809 has about 70.5% the radius of the Sun and 61.4% of the Sun's mass. It has a metallicity of −0.06, which means that the abundance of elements other than hydrogen and helium is just 87.1% that of the Sun.

This is a high proper motion star that moves about 0.77 arcseconds per year relative to background stars. In physical terms it is travelling with a space velocity of 31.1 km/s relative to the Solar System. The galactic orbit of this star carries it 21,300 ly from the Galactic Center at its perigee to 30,600 ly at its apogee. The orbital eccentricity is 17.8% with the semi-major axis of 25,956 ly and a semi-minor axis of 25,542 ly.

Gliese 809 forms an optical double with the 9th magnitude star BD+61°2067, but this is an unrelated background star.

== See also ==
- List of nearest stars and brown dwarfs
