= HK Aquarii =

Star in the constellation Aquarius

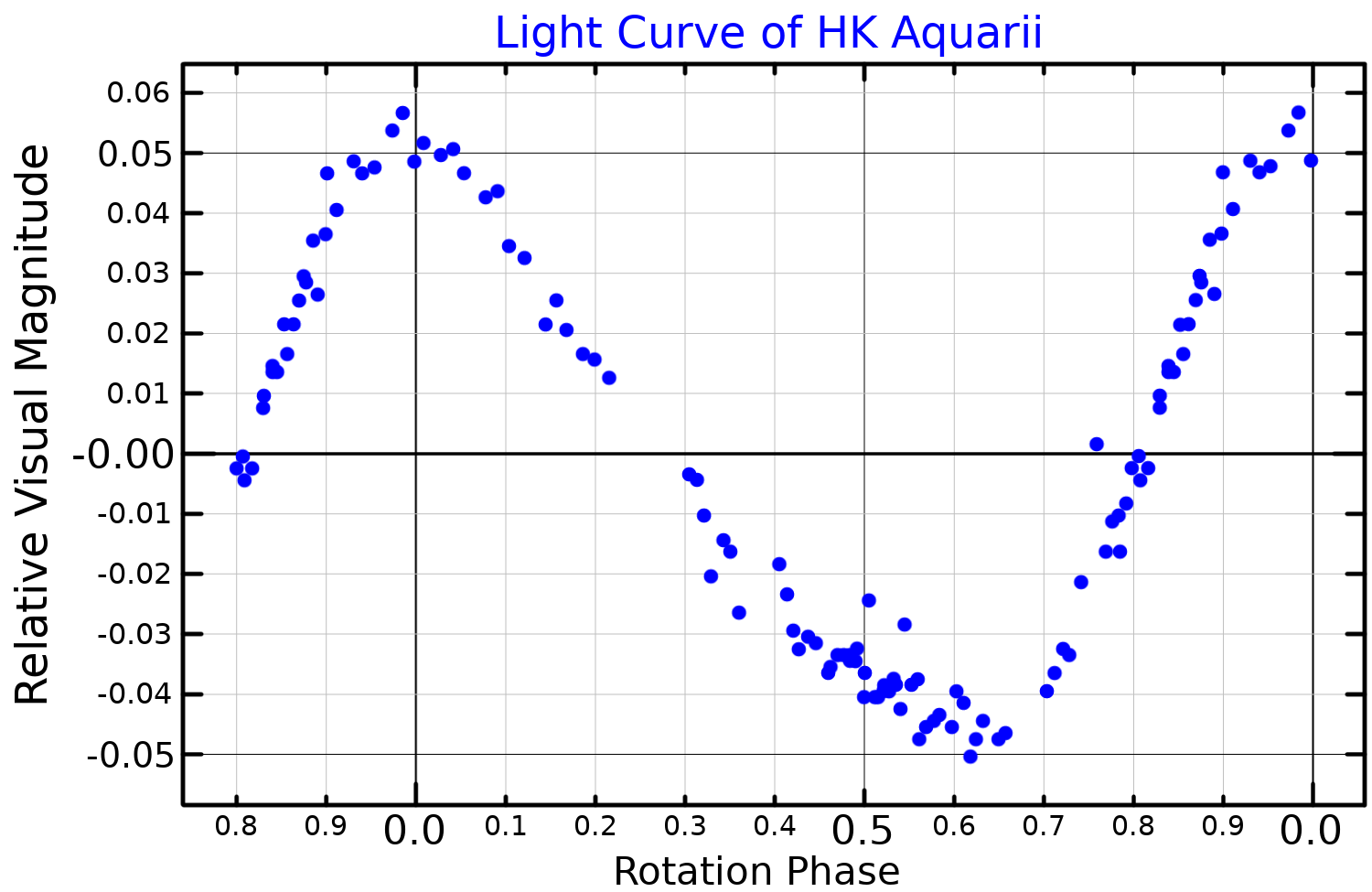
- A visual band light curve for HK Aquarii, adapted from Young et al. (1990)

Observation data Epoch J2000 Equinox ICRS
- Constellation: Aquarius
- Right ascension: 23^{h} 08^{m} 19.55110^{s}
- Declination: +15° 24′ 35.7682″
- Apparent magnitude (V): 10.99±0.02; 10.72 - 10.94

Characteristics
- Evolutionary stage: Main sequence
- Spectral type: M0Ve
- U−B color index: +1.118
- B−V color index: +1.31
- Variable type: BY Dra + UV Cet

Astrometry
Radial velocity (R_{v})	+2.7±1.6 km/s
Proper motion (μ)	RA: 106.955 mas/yr Dec.: −18.738 mas/yr
Parallax (π)	40.1410±0.0436 mas
Distance	81.25 ± 0.09 ly (24.91 ± 0.03 pc)
Absolute magnitude (M_{V})	+9.13

Details
Mass	0.57±0.07 M_{☉}
Radius	0.53±0.04 R_{☉}
Luminosity	0.05±0.01 L_{☉}
Temperature	3,800±76 K
Metallicity [Fe/H]	0.27±0.12 dex
Rotation	0.4307 d
Rotational velocity (v sin i)	69.0±0.1 km/s km/s
Age	30–40 Myr

Other designations
- HK Aqr, NSV 14434, BD−16°6218, GJ 890, HIP 114252

Database references
SIMBAD	data

HK Aquarii is a single variable star in the equatorial constellation of Aquarius. It is invisible to the naked eye, having an average apparent visual magnitude that fluctuates around 10.99. The star is located at a distance of 81 light years from the Sun based on parallax. The radial velocity is poorly constrained but it appears to be drifting further away at a rate of ~2 km/s.

In 1983, Arthur Young et al. discovered that the star, called GLS 890 at that time, is a variable star. They also noted its very rapid rotation. It was given its variable star designation, HK Aquarii, in 1987.

This is a small red dwarf star; an M-type main-sequence star with a stellar classification of M0Ve, where the 'e' indicates emission lines in the spectrum. It has 57% of the mass of the Sun and has 53% of the Sun's girth. The star is spinning with a projected rotational velocity of 69 km/s and has a rotation period of just 10.34 hours. Based on the abundance of iron in the atmosphere, it has a high metallicity; what astronomers term the abundances of elements with a higher atomic number than helium. The star is radiating around 5% of the luminosity of the Sun from its photosphere at an effective temperature of 3,800 K.

HK Aquarii is classified as a BY Draconis variable and has been observed ranging in brightness from visual magnitude 10.72 down to 10.94. This star is noteworthy for being unusually active for an isolated red dwarf; it rotates rapidly, generating a strong magnetic field that creates large starspots and powerful flares. Star spots have been reported at a variety of latitudes, but not at the poles. Flaring activity was reported in 1987, and a steady X-ray emission has been detected. These are characteristic of very young stars; although it is not close to any youthful open cluster, it is a possible ejected member of the Pleiades. (A 2016 study instead suggests it is a member of the Octans association.)

The signature of prominences has been detected in the star's atmosphere. These display evidence of periodic oscillations and can reach altitudes greater than two-third's of the star's radius. The prominences can obtain a higher mass and volume compared to similar features on the Sun.
