= HR 3750 =

Binary star system in the constellation Hydra

Observation data Epoch J2000 Equinox ICRS
- Constellation: Hydra
- Right ascension: 09^{h} 27^{m} 46.7799^{s}
- Declination: −06° 04′ 16.282″
- Apparent magnitude (V): 5.40

Characteristics
- Evolutionary stage: subgiant
- Spectral type: G1.5IV-V
- Apparent magnitude (G): 5.1625

Astrometry
| Radial velocity (R_{v}) | +54.93±0.21 km/s |
| Proper motion (μ) | RA: −242.6±0.4 mas/yr Dec.: −52.7±0.3 mas/yr |
| Parallax (π) | 32.30±0.36 mas |
| Distance | 101 ± 1 ly (31.0 ± 0.3 pc) |
| Absolute magnitude (M_{V}) | A:2.76; B:4.28 |

Orbit
| Period (P) | 34.53±0.16 years |
| Semi-major axis (a) | 0.4089±0.0079″ |
| Eccentricity (e) | 0.366±0.022 |
| Inclination (i) | 85.4±0.0° |
| Longitude of the node (Ω) | 150.42±0.39° |
| Periastron epoch (T) | 2,455,083±211 JD |
| Argument of periastron (ω) (primary) | 347.5±6.7° |
| Semi-amplitude (K_{1}) (primary) | 5.42±0.17 km/s |
| Semi-amplitude (K_{2}) (secondary) | 6.30±0.25 km/s |

Details

HD 81809 A
| Mass | 0.87±0.08 M_{☉} |
| Radius | 1.95±0.08 R_{☉} |
| Luminosity | 3.44±0.43 L_{☉} |
| Luminosity (bolometric) | 5.8±0.3 L_{☉} |
| Surface gravity (log g) | 3.7981±0.0054 cgs |
| Temperature | 5,619±125 K |
| Metallicity [Fe/H] | −0.49±0.14 dex |
| Rotation | 40.2 days |
| Rotational velocity (v sin i) | 2.0±1.5 km/s |
| Age | 9.75±1.78 Gyr |

HD 81809 B
| Mass | 0.83±0.01 M_{☉} |
| Radius | 1.12±0.03 R_{☉} |
| Luminosity | 1.31±0.10 L_{☉} |
| Surface gravity (log g) | 4.2776±0.0027 cgs |
| Temperature | 5,833±72 K |
| Metallicity [Fe/H] | −0.23±0.06 dex |
| Age | 11.1±1.5 Gyr |

Other designations
- BD−05 2802, GJ 344, HD 81809, HIP 46404, HR 3750, SAO 136872, LTT 3482, 2MASS J09274680-0604164

Database references
| SIMBAD | data |
| ARICNS | data |

HR 3750 is a binary star system in the equatorial constellation of Hydra at a distance of 101 light years. This object is visible to the naked eye as a dim, white star with an apparent visual magnitude of 5.4. It is receding from the Earth with a heliocentric radial velocity of 57.9±0.2 km/s. This binary is unusual because its eruptions do not seem to conform to the Waldmeier effect—i.e. the strongest eruptions of HR 3750 are not the ones characterized by the fast eruption onset. Kinematically, the binary belongs to the thick disk of the Milky Way galaxy—a population of ancient, metal-poor stars.

The star system is a spectroscopic binary with a 32 year, nearly edge-on orbit. The primary, HD 81809 A's visual magnitude is 5.610±0.005 while the secondary, HD 81809 B's visual magnitude is 7.115±0.015. The larger star, HD 81809 A, has been hypothetised to have engulfed a 0.36 M_{☉} red dwarf star 1–3 billion years ago to explain its unusually older age than expected from theorethical models, but the age discrepancy has been resolved as of 2026 with newer data, discarding the need of a stellar merger. The secondary component, however, appears to be more metal-enriched than the primary, which is unexpected for stars that presumably formed in the same envoirment. This indicates that component B had its metallicity changed after a collision with (metal-enriched) planetesimals.

HD 81809 A has a well defined chromospheric activity cycle with a period of 7.3±1.5 years.
