= Gliese 880 =

Star in the constellation Pegasus

Observation data Epoch J2000 Equinox ICRS
- Constellation: Pegasus
- Right ascension: 22^{h} 56^{m} 34.805^{s}
- Declination: +16° 33′ 12.36″
- Apparent magnitude (V): 8.68

Characteristics
- Evolutionary stage: Main sequence
- Spectral type: M1.5V
- Apparent magnitude (B): 10.187
- Apparent magnitude (R): 7.80
- Apparent magnitude (I): 7.100
- Apparent magnitude (J): 5.360±0.020
- Apparent magnitude (H): 4.800±0.036
- Apparent magnitude (K): 4.523±0.016
- B−V color index: 1.507±0.015

Astrometry
Radial velocity (R_{v})	−27.87±0.13 km/s
Proper motion (μ)	RA: −1034.733(26) mas/yr Dec.: −284.131(25) mas/yr
Parallax (π)	145.6234±0.0255 mas
Distance	22.397 ± 0.004 ly (6.867 ± 0.001 pc)
Absolute magnitude (M_{V})	9.50

Details
Mass	0.569 M_{☉}
Radius	0.548±0.005 R_{☉}
Luminosity	0.05112±0.00074 L_{☉}
Habitable zone inner limit	0.218 AU
Habitable zone outer limit	0.435 AU
Surface gravity (log g)	4.77 cgs
Temperature	3,713±11 K
Metallicity [Fe/H]	+0.20±0.05 dex
Rotation	37.5±0.1 d
Rotational velocity (v sin i)	2.07 km/s

Other designations
- BD+15 4733, HD 216899, HIP 113296, Ross 671, 2MASS J22563497+1633130

Database references
SIMBAD	data

Gliese 880 is a red dwarf star 22.4 light-years away in the northern constellation of Pegasus. No stellar companions to Gliese 880 have been discovered as of 2020.

== Search for planets ==
In June 2019, a candidate planet detected by radial velocity in orbit around Gliese 880 was reported in a preprint. This would have a minimum mass about 8.5 times that of Earth and orbit with a period of 39.4 days, which is close to the star's rotation period of 37.5 days. A 2024 study did not detect the exact period of 39.4 days, but detected two radial velocity signals at 37.2 and 40.5 days, which correspond to the stellar rotation and an alias of it. Presumably, the previously claimed planet candidate is an artifact of stellar activity.
