= HR 511 =

Star in the constellation Cassiopeia

- Location of HR 511 (circled)

Observation data Epoch J2000 Equinox ICRS
- Constellation: Cassiopeia
- Right ascension: 01^{h} 47^{m} 44.83444^{s}
- Declination: +63° 51′ 09.0110″
- Apparent magnitude (V): 5.63

Characteristics
- Evolutionary stage: main sequence
- Spectral type: K0 V
- U−B color index: +0.40
- B−V color index: +0.80

Astrometry
Radial velocity (R_{v})	+2.62±0.12 km/s
Proper motion (μ)	RA: +581.684 mas/yr Dec.: −246.462 mas/yr
Parallax (π)	99.5902±0.0438 mas
Distance	32.75 ± 0.01 ly (10.041 ± 0.004 pc)
Absolute magnitude (M_{V})	5.61

Details
Mass	0.825±0.021 M_{☉}
Radius	0.819±0.024 R_{☉}
Luminosity	0.516±0.010 L_{☉}
Temperature	5,407±4.0 K
Metallicity [Fe/H]	−0.02 dex
Rotation	21.67 days
Rotational velocity (v sin i)	2.0 km/s
Age	2.2 - 3.5 Gyr

Other designations
- V987 Cassiopeiae, BD+63°238, GJ 75, HD 10780, HIP 8362, HR 511, SAO 11983, LHS 1297, LTT 10619

Database references
SIMBAD	data
ARICNS	data

HR 511 (also designated V987 Cassiopeiae and Gliese 75 among others) is an orange dwarf of spectral type K0V in the constellation Cassiopeia. With an apparent magnitude of 5.63, it is faintly visible to the naked eye. The star is relatively close, 32.8 light-years from the Sun, just above 10 parsecs.

This star is estimated to be about the same age as the Sun, with 83% of the mass of the Sun and 82% of the Sun's radius. It has not been identified as a member of any moving star groups. This star has displayed unusual emissions of Ca II and is much more x-ray luminous than the Sun. It is considered a relatively active star. Based on an iron abundance of [Fe/H] = −0.02, the metallicity of this star appears to be similar to that of the Sun.
