= HD 195564 =

Star in the constellation Capricornus

Observation data Epoch J2000.0 Equinox ICRS
- Constellation: Capricornus
- Right ascension: 20^{h} 32^{m} 23.695^{s}
- Declination: −09° 51′ 12.18″
- Apparent magnitude (V): 5.65

Characteristics
- Evolutionary stage: subgiant
- Spectral type: G2.5IV
- U−B color index: +0.20
- B−V color index: +0.68

Astrometry
Radial velocity (R_{v})	+9.58 km/s
Proper motion (μ)	RA: +309.736 mas/yr Dec.: +109.910 mas/yr
Parallax (π)	40.4241±0.0497 mas
Distance	80.68 ± 0.10 ly (24.74 ± 0.03 pc)
Absolute magnitude (M_{V})	+3.72

Orbit
Primary	620+300 −170 years
Semi-major axis (a)	88+26 −17 au
Eccentricity (e)	0.917+0.037 −0.064
Inclination (i)	64.3+5.7 −6.0°

Details

HD 195564 A
Mass	1.242+0.062 −0.060 M_{☉}
Radius	1.894±0.080 R_{☉}
Luminosity	2.986±0.018 L_{☉}
Surface gravity (log g)	3.95±0.05 cgs
Temperature	5,514±116 K
Metallicity [Fe/H]	0.05±0.02 dex
Rotational velocity (v sin i)	1.91 km/s
Age	8.2 Gyr

HD 195564 B
Mass	0.520+0.027 −0.026 M_{☉}

Other designations
- BD−10°5423, FK5 1536, GJ 792.1, HD 195564, HIP 101345, HR 7845, SAO 163665

Database references
SIMBAD	data
ARICNS	data

HD 195564 is a binary star in the southern constellation of Capricornus. It is faintly visible to the naked eye with an apparent visual magnitude of 5.65. Parallax measurements give us an estimate of its distance as 81 light years.

Based upon the spectrum of light emitted by the primary, it has a stellar classification of G2.5IV. This indicates that it is a G-type subgiant that has exhausted the hydrogen in its core region. It has a mass of 1.242 times the mass of the Sun, but a measured radius that is 1.894 times as large. As a result, it shines with 2.986 times the luminosity of the Sun. The abundance of elements in this star is similar to that in the Sun, although it is an older star with an age of around 8.2 billion years. The effective temperature of the stellar atmosphere is 5,514 K, giving it the yellow-hued glow of an ordinary K-type star.

The secondary companion has an apparent magnitude of 11.30, and a mass just 55% that of the Sun. The pair orbit each other with an estimated period of around 620 years, following a highly-eccentric path.

In a paper published in April 2017, a candidate planet was found orbiting HD 195564 A with a period of 5,404 days (14.80 yr).

The HD 195564 planetary system
Companion (in order from star)	Mass	Semimajor axis (AU)	Orbital period (days)	Eccentricity	Inclination (°)	Radius
b (unconfirmed)	—	—	5403±164	—	—	—
