= Gliese 328 =

Red dwarf

Observation data Epoch J2000 Equinox ICRS
- Constellation: Hydra
- Right ascension: 08^{h} 55^{m} 07.62173^{s}
- Declination: +01° 32′ 47.4151″
- Apparent magnitude (V): 9.997

Characteristics
- Evolutionary stage: main-sequence star
- Spectral type: M0V
- B−V color index: 1.30

Astrometry
Radial velocity (R_{v})	−4.27±0.13 km/s
Proper motion (μ)	RA: 44.944 mas/yr Dec.: −1045.876 mas/yr
Parallax (π)	48.7404±0.0184 mas
Distance	66.92 ± 0.03 ly (20.517 ± 0.008 pc)

Details
Mass	0.65±0.08 M_{☉}
Radius	0.63±0.07 R_{☉}
Luminosity	0.08 L_{☉}
Surface gravity (log g)	4.64±0.07 cgs
Temperature	3897±71 K
Metallicity [Fe/H]	−0.06±0.09 dex
Rotation	33.6 days
Rotational velocity (v sin i)	1.55 km/s

Other designations
- BD+02 2098, GJ 328, HIP 43790, Ross 623, TYC 213-177-1, 2MASS J08550761+0132472

Database references
SIMBAD	data

Gliese 328, also known as BD+02 2098, is a red dwarf star located 66.9 light-years (20.5 parsecs) away in the constellation Hydra. Its surface temperature is 3989 K. Gliese 328 is depleted in heavy elements compared to the Sun, with a metallicity Fe/H index of −0.13. The age of the star is unknown. Gliese 328 exhibits an activity cycle similar to that of the Sun, with a period around 2000 d.

Multiplicity surveys did not detect any stellar companions as of 2016.

== Planetary system ==
In 2013, one superjovian planet, named Gliese 328 b, was discovered on a wide, eccentric orbit by the radial velocity method. The known planetary orbit is wide enough to not disrupt orbits of other bodies in the habitable zone of the star. In 2023, a second, Neptune-mass planet was discovered orbiting closer to the star.

The Gliese 328 planetary system
Companion (in order from star)	Mass	Semimajor axis (AU)	Orbital period (days)	Eccentricity	Inclination (°)	Radius
c	≥21.4+3.4 −3.2 M_{🜨}	0.657+0.026 −0.028	241.8+1.3 −1.7	—	—	—
b	≥2.51±0.23 M_{J}	4.11+0.16 −0.18	3771±17	0.227±0.015	—	—
