= HD 3443 =

Binary star system in constellation Cetus

Observation data Epoch J2000 Equinox ICRS
- Constellation: Cetus
- Right ascension: 00^{h} 37^{m} 20.7196^{s}
- Declination: −24° 46′ 02.1843″
- Apparent magnitude (V): 5.57

Characteristics

HD 3443A
- Evolutionary stage: main sequence
- Spectral type: G9V
- Apparent magnitude (g): 5.95

HD 3443B
- Evolutionary stage: main sequence
- Spectral type: K0.5V

Astrometry
Radial velocity (R_{v})	18.63 km/s
Proper motion (μ)	RA: 1450.34 mas/yr Dec.: −19.38 mas/yr
Parallax (π)	64.93±1.85 mas
Distance	50 ± 1 ly (15.4 ± 0.4 pc)
Absolute magnitude (M_{V})	5.31±0.08

Orbit
Primary	HD 3443A
Secondary	HD 3443B
Period (P)	25.09 y
Semi-major axis (a)	0.4627" (8.9 AU)
Eccentricity (e)	0.235
Inclination (i)	65.9°
Semi-amplitude (K_{1}) (primary)	18.4 km/s

Details

HD 3443A
Mass	0.915±0.005 M_{☉}
Radius	1.31 R_{☉}
Luminosity	1.2 L_{☉}
Surface gravity (log g)	4.23 cgs
Temperature	5449 K
Metallicity [Fe/H]	−0.12 dex
Rotation	32.6±4.89 d
Rotational velocity (v sin i)	2.7±1.3 km/s
Age	9.36 Gyr

HD 3443B
Mass	0.864±0.005 M_{☉}

Other designations
- CD−25 225, CPD−25 64, GJ 25, HIP 2941, HR 159, WDS 00373−2446, 2MASS J00372057−2446023
- HD 3443A: TYC 6421-1924-1
- HD 3443B: TYC 6421-1924-2

Database references
SIMBAD	data

HD 3443 is a binary system composed of medium-mass main sequence stars in the constellation of Cetus about 50 light years away.

== System ==
This binary star system, with an orbital semimajor axis 8.9 AU, has not had any circumstellar dust detected as of 2020. While the habitable zones of the stars stretch from 0.55 to 0.95 AU from the stars, planetary orbits with a semimajor axis beyond 1.87 AU would become unstable due to the influence of the binary companion.

== Properties ==
The star system is enriched in oxygen compared to the Solar System, having 140% of solar oxygen abundance, but is depleted in heavier elements, having 75% of solar abundance of iron.
