= HD 158633 =

Star in the constellation Draco

- Location of HD 158633 (circled in red)

Observation data Epoch J2000 Equinox ICRS
- Constellation: Draco
- Right ascension: 17^{h} 25^{m} 00.09774^{s}
- Declination: +67° 18′ 24.1487″
- Apparent magnitude (V): 6.44

Characteristics
- Evolutionary stage: main sequence
- Spectral type: K0 V
- U−B color index: +0.29
- B−V color index: +0.76

Astrometry
Radial velocity (R_{v})	−38.71±0.08 km/s
Proper motion (μ)	RA: −531.749 mas/yr Dec.: +4.818 mas/yr
Parallax (π)	78.1747±0.0226 mas
Distance	41.72 ± 0.01 ly (12.792 ± 0.004 pc)
Absolute magnitude (M_{V})	5.89

Details
Mass	0.729 M_{☉}
Radius	0.7891±0.0144 R_{☉}
Luminosity	0.4090±0.0040 L_{☉}
Surface gravity (log g)	4.80 cgs
Temperature	5,203±46 K
Metallicity [Fe/H]	−0.43±0.08 dex
Rotational velocity (v sin i)	3.4 km/s
Age	4.27 Gyr

Other designations
- BD+67°1014, GJ 675, HD 158633, HIP 85235, HR 6518, SAO 17474, LHS 287, LTT 15185

Database references
SIMBAD	data

HD 158633 is a main sequence star in the northern constellation of Draco. With an apparent visual magnitude of 6.43, this star is a challenge to view with the unaided eye but it can be seen clearly with a small telescope. Based upon parallax measurements, it is 42 light years from the Sun. The star is drifting closer to the Sun with a radial velocity of −39 km/s, and is predicted to come to within 26.5 ly (8.1 pc) in around 190,400 years.

This is a K-type main sequence star with a spectral classification of K0 V. It has about 79% of the Sun's radius and 73% of the solar mass. It is an estimated 4.3 billion years old and is spinning with a projected rotational velocity of 3.4 km/s. The star is emitting an excess of infrared radiation at a wavelength of 70 μm, suggesting the presence of an orbiting debris disk. It has a low metallicity, with only 37% of the Sun's abundance of elements more massive than helium, and has a relatively high proper motion.
