= 13 Trianguli =

Star in the constellation Triangulum

- Location of 13 Trianguli (circled)

Observation data Epoch J2000 Equinox ICRS
- Constellation: Triangulum
- Right ascension: 02^{h} 28^{m} 48.49449^{s}
- Declination: +29° 55′ 54.3286″
- Apparent magnitude (V): 5.89

Characteristics
- Spectral type: G0 V
- U−B color index: +0.01
- B−V color index: +0.591±0.014

Astrometry
Radial velocity (R_{v})	+40.8 km/s
Proper motion (μ)	RA: –66.071 mas/yr Dec.: +71.499 mas/yr
Parallax (π)	31.7031±0.1014 mas
Distance	102.9 ± 0.3 ly (31.5 ± 0.1 pc)
Absolute magnitude (M_{V})	3.45

Details
Mass	1.10±0.03 M_{☉}
Radius	1.86±0.03 R_{☉}
Luminosity	3.72 L_{☉}
Temperature	5,846 K
Metallicity [Fe/H]	−0.24 dex
Rotational velocity (v sin i)	3 km/s
Age	6.45 Gyr

Other designations
- 13 Tri, BD+29 423, GJ 99.1, HD 15335, HIP 11548, HR 720, SAO 75391

Database references
SIMBAD	data

13 Trianguli is the Flamsteed designation for a star in the northern constellation of Triangulum. It has an apparent visual magnitude of 5.89, so according to the Bortle scale it is faintly visible from dark suburban skies. The star is located at a distance of 103 light years from the Sun based on parallax measurements, and is drifting further away with a radial velocity of +41 km/s. It made a close approach to the Sun some 665,000 years ago at an estimated separation of 34.3 light-years.

A stellar classification of G0 V indicates this is a main sequence star that is generating energy by fusing hydrogen into helium at its core. It has about 110% of the Sun's mass, 186% of the Sun's radius, and shines with 3.72 times the luminosity of the Sun. The stellar atmosphere has an effective temperature of 5,846 K, giving it the yellow hue of a G-type star. It appears to be older than the Sun, with an estimated age of 6.45 billion years.

In 1994, an astrometric companion was reported at an angular separation of 0.020″. However, follow-up observations reported in 2005 not only failed to recover this object but also returned a null result on a search for planetary companions. The star has been examined for an infrared excess that could indicate the presence of an orbiting debris disk, but no such excess was found.
