= HD 88218 =

Binary star in the constellation Antlia

Observation data Epoch J2000.0 Equinox ICRS
- Constellation: Antlia
- Right ascension: 10^{h} 09^{m} 31.7681^{s}
- Declination: −35° 51′ 24.404″
- Apparent magnitude (V): 6.14

Characteristics
- Evolutionary stage: subgiant
- Spectral type: G0 V
- U−B color index: +0.16
- B−V color index: +0.6

Astrometry
| Radial velocity (R_{v}) | 36.7±0.1 km/s |
| Proper motion (μ) | RA: −445.632 mas/yr Dec.: +18.774 mas/yr |
| Parallax (π) | 31.5137±0.0307 mas |
| Distance | 103.5 ± 0.1 ly (31.73 ± 0.03 pc) |
| Absolute magnitude (M_{V}) | +3.64 |

Orbit
| Period (P) | 268+92 −56 yr |
| Semi-major axis (a) | 51+12 −8 au |
| Eccentricity (e) | 0.611+0.055 −0.098 |
| Inclination (i) | 57.21+0.65 −0.60° |

Details

A
| Mass | 1.268+0.064 −0.063 M_{☉} |
| Radius | 1.66 R_{☉} |
| Luminosity | 2.88 L_{☉} |
| Surface gravity (log g) | 4.03±0.03 cgs |
| Temperature | 5,878±14 K |
| Metallicity [Fe/H] | −0.14±0.01 dex |
| Rotational velocity (v sin i) | 3 km/s |
| Age | 6.8^{+0.49}_{−0.41} Gyr |

B
| Mass | 0.617+0.064 −0.057 M_{☉} |

Other designations
- 49 G. Antliae, CD−35°6194, CPD−35°3974, FK5 2816, GJ 379.1, HD 88218, HIP 49769, HR 3992, SAO 201109, WDS J10095-3551AB

Database references
| SIMBAD | data |

HD 88218 (HR 3992) is a binary star in the southern constellation Antlia. The system has a combined apparent magnitude of 6.14, making it faintly visible to the naked eye. HD 88218 is relatively close at a distance of 103 light years but is receding with a heliocentric radial velocity of 36.7 km/s.

The visible component has a stellar classification of G0 V, indicating the object's status as a solar analogue. As for the companion, it is probably a K-type star based on a mass of 0.62 M_{☉}. The stars have an orbital period of 270 years (albeit with great uncertainty) a semi-major axis of 50 astronomical units and an eccentricity of 0.61.

Despite the class described above, the primary is starting to evolve off the main sequence at the age of 6.8 billion years, having a low surface gravity and a slightly enlarged radius of 1.66 R_{☉}, with the addition of being chromospherically inactive. Nevertheless, it has 107% the mass of the Sun and radiates at 2.88 times the luminosity of the Sun from its photosphere at an effective temperature of 5,870 K, giving a yellow glow. HD 88218 A has an iron abundance 72% that of the Sun and spins leisurely with a projected rotational velocity of 3 km/s.
