= HD 114837 =

Binary star system in the constellation Centaurus

- Location of HD 114837 (circled in red)

Observation data Epoch J2000 Equinox J2000
- Constellation: Centaurus
- Right ascension: 13^{h} 14^{m} 15.14474^{s}
- Declination: −59° 06′ 11.6540″
- Apparent magnitude (V): 4.90 + 10.2

Characteristics
- Evolutionary stage: main sequence
- Spectral type: F6 V Fe-0.4
- B−V color index: 0.489±0.020

Astrometry
Radial velocity (R_{v})	−64.0±0.3 km/s
Proper motion (μ)	RA: −248.678 mas/yr Dec.: −153.176 mas/yr
Parallax (π)	54.8247±0.0809 mas
Distance	59.49 ± 0.09 ly (18.24 ± 0.03 pc)
Absolute magnitude (M_{V})	3.73

Details

HD 114837 A
Mass	1.14 M_{☉}
Radius	1.3 R_{☉}
Luminosity	3.12 L_{☉}
Surface gravity (log g)	4.21 cgs
Temperature	6,346±80 K
Metallicity [Fe/H]	−0.27 dex
Rotational velocity (v sin i)	8.8±3.0 km/s
Age	3.40 Gyr

Other designations
- CD−58°4940, GJ 503, HD 114837, HIP 64583, HR 4989, SAO 240666, WDS J13143-5906A

Database references
SIMBAD	data

HD 114837 is a suspected binary star system in the southern constellation of Centaurus. The brighter star is faintly visible to the naked eye with an apparent visual magnitude of 4.90. It has a magnitude 10.2 candidate common proper motion companion at an angular separation of 4.2″, as of 2014. The distance to this system, based on an annual parallax shift of 54.825″ as seen from Earth's orbit, is 59.5 light years. It is moving closer with a heliocentric radial velocity of −64 km/s, and will approach to within 21.8 ly in around 240,600 years.

The primary component is an F-type main-sequence star with a stellar classification of F6 V Fe-0.4, showing a mild underabundance of iron in its spectrum. It is about 3.4 billion years old with 1.14 times the mass of the Sun and about 1.3 times the Sun's radius. This star is radiating 3.12 times the Sun's luminosity from its photosphere at an effective temperature of 6,346 K.
