= HD 10800 =

Star in the constellation of Octans

Observation data Epoch J2000.0 Equinox ICRS
- Constellation: Octans
- Right ascension: 01^{h} 37^{m} 55.5567^{s}
- Declination: −82° 58′ 29.987″
- Apparent magnitude (V): 5.87

Characteristics
- Spectral type: G1 V
- U−B color index: +0.10
- B−V color index: +0.61

Astrometry
Radial velocity (R_{v})	−1.1±0.4 km/s
Proper motion (μ)	RA: +122.526 mas/yr Dec.: +120.827 mas/yr
Parallax (π)	37.0128±0.229 mas
Distance	88.1 ± 0.5 ly (27.0 ± 0.2 pc)
Absolute magnitude (M_{V})	+3.69

Orbit
Primary	Aa
Name	Ab
Period (P)	19.371 d
Eccentricity (e)	0.103±0.001
Periastron epoch (T)	2,456,938.6±0.02 JD
Argument of periastron (ω) (primary)	243±0.4°
Semi-amplitude (K_{1}) (primary)	36.45±0.04 km/s
Semi-amplitude (K_{2}) (secondary)	43.32±0.05 km/s

Orbit
Primary	A
Name	B
Period (P)	1.7486±0.0005 yr
Semi-major axis (a)	7.823±0.047 mas
Eccentricity (e)	0.191±0.002
Inclination (i)	47.6±0.5°
Periastron epoch (T)	2,456,903.42±0.94 JD
Argument of periastron (ω) (primary)	151.2±0.3°
Semi-amplitude (K_{1}) (primary)	9.1±0.03 km/s
Semi-amplitude (K_{2}) (secondary)	17.9±0.05 km/s

Details

Aa
Mass	1.09 M_{☉}
Radius	1.1 R_{☉}
Luminosity	1.82±0.04 L_{☉}
Surface gravity (log g)	5 cgs
Temperature	5,802 K
Metallicity [Fe/H]	−0.09±0.11 dex
Rotational velocity (v sin i)	7 km/s
Age	5.01±4.51 Gyr

Ab
Mass	0.64 M_{☉}

B
Mass	1±0.1 M_{☉}
Luminosity	0.98^{+0.25}_{−0.20} L_{☉}
Temperature	5,741 K
Age	4.79^{+1.24}_{−0.98} Gyr

Other designations
- 3 G. Octantis, CPD−83°27, GC 2063, GJ 67.1, HD 10800, HIP 7601, HR 512, SAO 258271, WDS J01379-8259AB

Database references
SIMBAD	data

HD 10800, also known as HR 512 or Gliese 67.1, is a triple star located in the southern circumpolar constellation Octans. It has a combined apparent magnitude of 5.87, allowing it to be faintly seen with the naked eye. The system is relatively close at a distance of 88.1 light years but is drifting closer with a heliocentric radial velocity −1.1 km/s.

The system has a blended spectral classification of G1 V, indicating an ordinary G-type main-sequence star. The primary is a spectroscopic binary consisting of a G-type and K-type star circling around each other in 19 days. HD 10800B has a class of G2 V, the same spectral class as our own Sun. The AB pair take 1.7 years to orbit each other.

== HD 10800A ==
The primary (Aa) has 109% the mass of the Sun and a radius 1.1 times that of the Sun. It radiates at 1.82 times the luminosity of the Sun from its photosphere at an effective temperature of 5,802 K, giving a yellow hue. HD 10800A has a metallicity 81% that of the Sun, making it slightly metal deficient. At an age of 5 billion years, it spins with a projected rotational velocity of 7 km/s. The close companion (Ab) has a mass 69% that of the Sun.

== HD 10800B ==
HD 10800B, the slightly distant companion, has the same mass of the Sun but is slightly cooler (37 K difference) and dimmer, with a luminosity 98% that of the Sun. The object is only marginally older than the Sun at an age of 4.8 billion years.
