= HR 3384 =

Star in the constellation Pyxis

- Location of HR 3384 (circled in red)

Observation data Epoch J2000 Equinox ICRS
- Constellation: Pyxis
- Right ascension: 08^{h} 32^{m} 51.49568^{s}
- Declination: −31° 30′ 03.0650″
- Apparent magnitude (V): 6.38

Characteristics
- Evolutionary stage: main sequence
- Spectral type: G9V
- U−B color index: +0.29
- B−V color index: +0.78

Astrometry
| Radial velocity (R_{v}) | +81.91 km/s |
| Proper motion (μ) | RA: −1,113.739 mas/yr Dec.: +762.420 mas/yr |
| Parallax (π) | 82.2080±0.0178 mas |
| Distance | 39.675 ± 0.009 ly (12.164 ± 0.003 pc) |
| Absolute magnitude (M_{V}) | 5.95 |

Details
| Mass | 0.750±0.015 M_{☉} |
| Radius | 0.85 R_{☉} |
| Luminosity | 0.44 L_{☉} |
| Surface gravity (log g) | 4.56 cgs |
| Temperature | 5,290 K |
| Metallicity [Fe/H] | −0.36 dex |
| Rotation | 40.2±4.1 d |
| Rotational velocity (v sin i) | 6.79 km/s |
| Age | 5.7–6.5 Gyr |

Other designations
- 11 G. Pyxidis, CD−31°6229, GJ 309, HD 72673, HIP 41926, HR 3384, SAO 199352, LHS 249, LTT 3168

Database references
| SIMBAD | data |

HR 3384 (11 G. Pyxidis) is a solitary star in the southern constellation of Pyxis. It has an apparent magnitude of 6.38, indicating it is faintly visible to the naked eye. Based on the Bortle scale, the star can be viewed from dark rural skies. Astrometric measurements of the star by the Hipparcos spacecraft, give an estimated distance of 40 light-years (12 parsecs) from Earth. It is moving away from the Sun with a radial velocity of +81.91.

This star is lower in mass than the Sun at around 75%, and has just 85% of the Sun's radius. The spectrum matches a spectral class G9V, indicating that this is a G-type main sequence star that is generating energy through the nuclear fusion of hydrogen at its core. The star is radiating 44% of the Sun's luminosity from its photosphere at an effective temperature of 5,290 K. It is about six billion years old and is rotating slowly with a period of around 40 days. Surface magnetic activity has been detected with a periodic cycle of 3,050+558
−408 days. HR 3384 has been examined for evidence of a circumstellar debris disk or planets, but, as of 2012, none have been discovered.
