= HD 29697 =

Star in the constellation Taurus

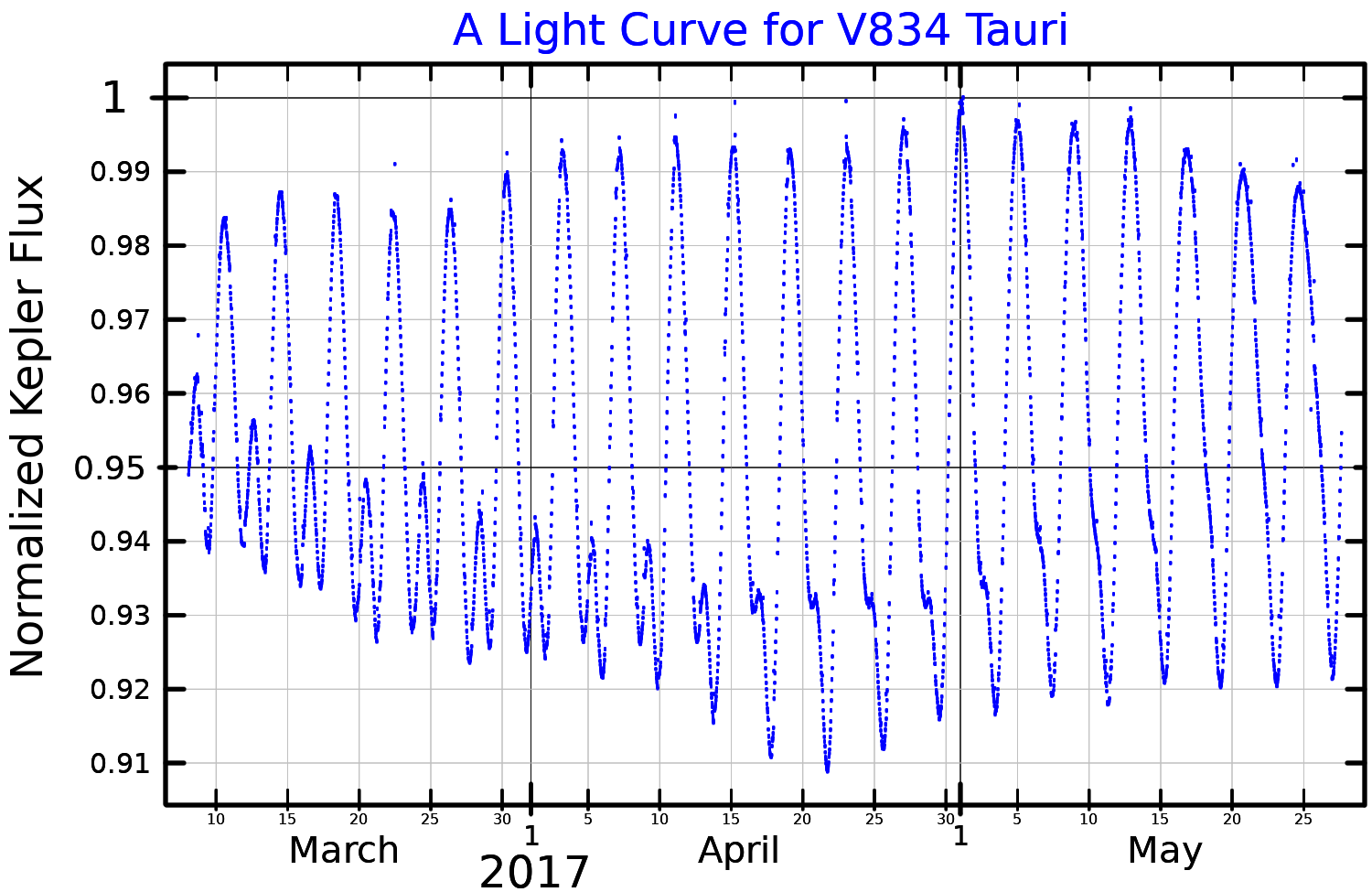
- A light curve for V834 Tauri, plotted from Kepler data

Observation data Epoch J2000 Equinox ICRS
- Constellation: Taurus
- Right ascension: 04^{h} 41^{m} 18.85521^{s}
- Declination: +20° 54′ 05.4469″
- Apparent magnitude (V): 7.94 - 8.33

Characteristics
- Evolutionary stage: main sequence
- Spectral type: K3 V
- U−B color index: +0.94
- B−V color index: +1.09
- Variable type: BY Dra

Astrometry
| Radial velocity (R_{v}) | +11 km/s |
| Proper motion (μ) | RA: −234261±0.029 mas/yr Dec.: −254.314±0.020 mas/yr |
| Parallax (π) | 75.6870±0.0241 mas |
| Distance | 43.09 ± 0.01 ly (13.212 ± 0.004 pc) |
| Absolute magnitude (M_{V}) | +7.49 |

Details
| Mass | 0.75 M_{☉} |
| Radius | 0.67 R_{☉} |
| Luminosity | 0.15 L_{☉} |
| Surface gravity (log g) | 4.50 cgs |
| Temperature | 4,454±11.4 K |
| Metallicity [Fe/H] | 0.01 dex |
| Rotational velocity (v sin i) | 9.73 km/s |
| Age | 49±37 Myr |

Other designations
- V834 Tau, BD+20°802, GJ 174, Gliese 174, HD 29697, HIP 21818, SAO 76708.

Database references
| SIMBAD | data |
| ARICNS | data |

HD 29697 (Gliese 174, V834 Tauri) is a variable star of BY Draconis type in the constellation Taurus. It has an apparent magnitude around 8 and is 43 ly away.

== Description ==
HD 29697 is the Henry Draper Catalogue number of this star. It is also known by its designation in the Gliese Catalogue of Nearby Stars, Gliese 174, and its variable star designation V834 Tauri.

In 1981, Pavel Fyodorovich Chugaynov announced that the brightness of HD 29697 varies as a function of time. V834 Tauri is a BY Draconis variable with maximum and minimum apparent magnitudes of 7.94 and 8.33 respectively, so it is never visible to the naked eye.

The star has been examined for indications of a circumstellar disk using the Spitzer Space Telescope, but no statistically-significant infrared excess was detected.
