= HD 125072 =

Star in the constellation Centaurus

Observation data Epoch J2000 Equinox ICRS
- Constellation: Centaurus
- Right ascension: 14^{h} 19^{m} 04.83414^{s}
- Declination: −59° 22′ 44.5272″
- Apparent magnitude (V): 6.637

Characteristics
- Spectral type: K3 IV
- U−B color index: +0.905
- B−V color index: +1.025

Astrometry
| Radial velocity (R_{v}) | −14.9 km/s |
| Proper motion (μ) | RA: −454.895 mas/yr Dec.: −810.729 mas/yr |
| Parallax (π) | 84.4535±0.0349 mas |
| Distance | 38.62 ± 0.02 ly (11.841 ± 0.005 pc) |
| Absolute magnitude (M_{V}) | 6.28 |

Details
| Mass | 0.806±0.017 M_{☉} |
| Radius | 0.83+0.02 −0.01 R_{☉} |
| Luminosity | 0.347±0.001 L_{☉} |
| Surface gravity (log g) | 4.48 cgs |
| Temperature | 4,858+47 −59 K |
| Metallicity [Fe/H] | −0.70 dex |
| Rotational velocity (v sin i) | 3.97 km/s |
| Age | 9.98 Gyr |

Other designations
- CD−58°5564, GJ 542, HD 125072, HIP 69972, SAO 241627, LHS 2892, LTT 5625

Database references
| SIMBAD | data |

HD 125072 is a star in the southern constellation of Centaurus. It is a challenge to view with the naked eye, having an apparent visual magnitude of 6.637. The star is located at a distance of 38.6 light years from the Sun based on parallax. It is drifting closer with a radial velocity of −14.9 km/s. The components of the space velocity for this star are U=−18.5, V=−6.9 and W=−26.9 km/s.

The stellar classification of this star is K3 IV, matching a K-type subgiant that is evolving into a giant. It has 81% of the Sun's mass and 83% of the radius of the Sun. The star is radiating 34.7% of the Sun's luminosity from its photosphere at an effective temperature of 4,858 K. Based on the composition and kinematics of this star, it has an estimated age of about 10 billion years. It is spinning with a projected rotational velocity of 4 km/s.
