= 15 Leonis Minoris =

Star in the constellation Ursa Major

- Location of 15 Leo Minoris (circled)

Observation data Epoch J2000.0 Equinox ICRS
- Constellation: Ursa Major
- Right ascension: 09^{h} 48^{m} 35.37135^{s}
- Declination: +46° 01′ 15.6266″
- Apparent magnitude (V): 5.08

Characteristics
- Evolutionary stage: subgiant
- Spectral type: G0 IV-V
- U−B color index: +0.175
- B−V color index: 0.619±0.007

Astrometry
Radial velocity (R_{v})	5.20±0.09 km/s
Proper motion (μ)	RA: +221.750 mas/yr Dec.: −92.356 mas/yr
Parallax (π)	53.1277±0.0773 mas
Distance	61.39 ± 0.09 ly (18.82 ± 0.03 pc)
Absolute magnitude (M_{V})	3.75

Details
Mass	1.15 M_{☉}
Radius	1.62 R_{☉}
Luminosity	2.80 L_{☉}
Habitable zone inner limit	1.25 AU
Habitable zone outer limit	2.93 AU
Surface gravity (log g)	4.04 cgs
Temperature	5,859 K
Metallicity [Fe/H]	0.01 dex
Rotational velocity (v sin i)	3.97 km/s
Age	9.3 Gyr

Other designations
- 15 LMi, BD+46°1551, FK5 1255, GJ 368, HD 84737, HIP 48113, HR 3881, SAO 43046

Database references
SIMBAD	data

15 Leonis Minoris is the Flamsteed designation for a single star in the northern circumpolar constellation of Ursa Major. It has an apparent visual magnitude of 5.08, making it a fifth magnitude star that is visible to the naked eye. Based on parallax measurements, it is located at a distance of 61.7 light years from the Sun. The star has been examined for an infrared excess, but none was detected.

This star has a stellar classification of G0 IV-V with an age of about 9.3 billion years, which suggests that it is an older G-type main sequence star that may be evolving into a subgiant as the hydrogen at its core runs out. The estimated mass of the star is 15% greater than the Sun's mass, and it is larger in girth than the Sun by +52%. It is spinning with a projected rotational velocity of 4 km/s. The star is radiating nearly three times the luminosity of the Sun from its photosphere at an effective temperature of 5,859 K, giving it the yellow-hued glow of a G-type star.

15 Leonis Minoris presents a significantly difference on proper motion measurements taken by the Hipparcos and Gaia spacecraft, suggesting it may have an orbiting giant planet.
