= 51 Arietis =

Star in the constellation Aries

Observation data Epoch J2000.0 Equinox J2000.0 (ICRS)
- Constellation: Aries
- Right ascension: 03^{h} 02^{m} 26.02628^{s}
- Declination: +26° 36′ 33.2602″
- Apparent magnitude (V): 6.623±0.005

Characteristics
- Spectral type: G8 V
- B−V color index: 0.715

Astrometry
Radial velocity (R_{v})	+9.5±0.1 km/s
Proper motion (μ)	RA: +233.122 mas/yr Dec.: −168.438 mas/yr
Parallax (π)	47.1551±0.0603 mas
Distance	69.17 ± 0.09 ly (21.21 ± 0.03 pc)
Absolute bolometric magnitude (M_{bol})	4.85±0.07

Details
Mass	1.04 M_{☉}
Radius	0.99±0.04 R_{☉}
Luminosity	0.92 L_{☉}
Surface gravity (log g)	4.46 cgs
Temperature	5,666 K
Metallicity [Fe/H]	0.15 dex
Rotational velocity (v sin i)	4.08 km/s
Age	1.40 Gyr

Other designations
- 51 Ari, BD+26°503, GJ 120.2, HD 18803, HIP 14150, SAO 75696

Database references
SIMBAD	data
ARICNS	data

51 Arietis is a star in the northern constellation of Aries. 51 Arietis is the Flamsteed designation. It is a dim, yellow-hued star – a challenge to view with the naked eye, having an apparent visual magnitude of 6.6. Based upon parallax measurements, the star is located at an estimated distance of 67.3 light-years (20.6 parsecs) from the Sun. It is receding from the Earth with a heliocentric radial velocity of +9.5 km/s, and is a member of the IC 2391 moving group.

This is an ordinary G-type main sequence star with a stellar classification of G8 V. Similar to the Sun, it has 1.04 times the mass and 0.99 times the Sun's radius. It is 1.4 billion years old with a leisurely rotation rate, showing a projected rotational velocity of 4 km/s. The atmospheric metallicity is higher than solar. The star radiates 92% of the Sun's luminosity from its photosphere at an effective temperature of 5,666 K. This heat gives it the golden-hued glow of a G-type star.
