= Gliese 208 =

Red dwarf star in the constellation Orion

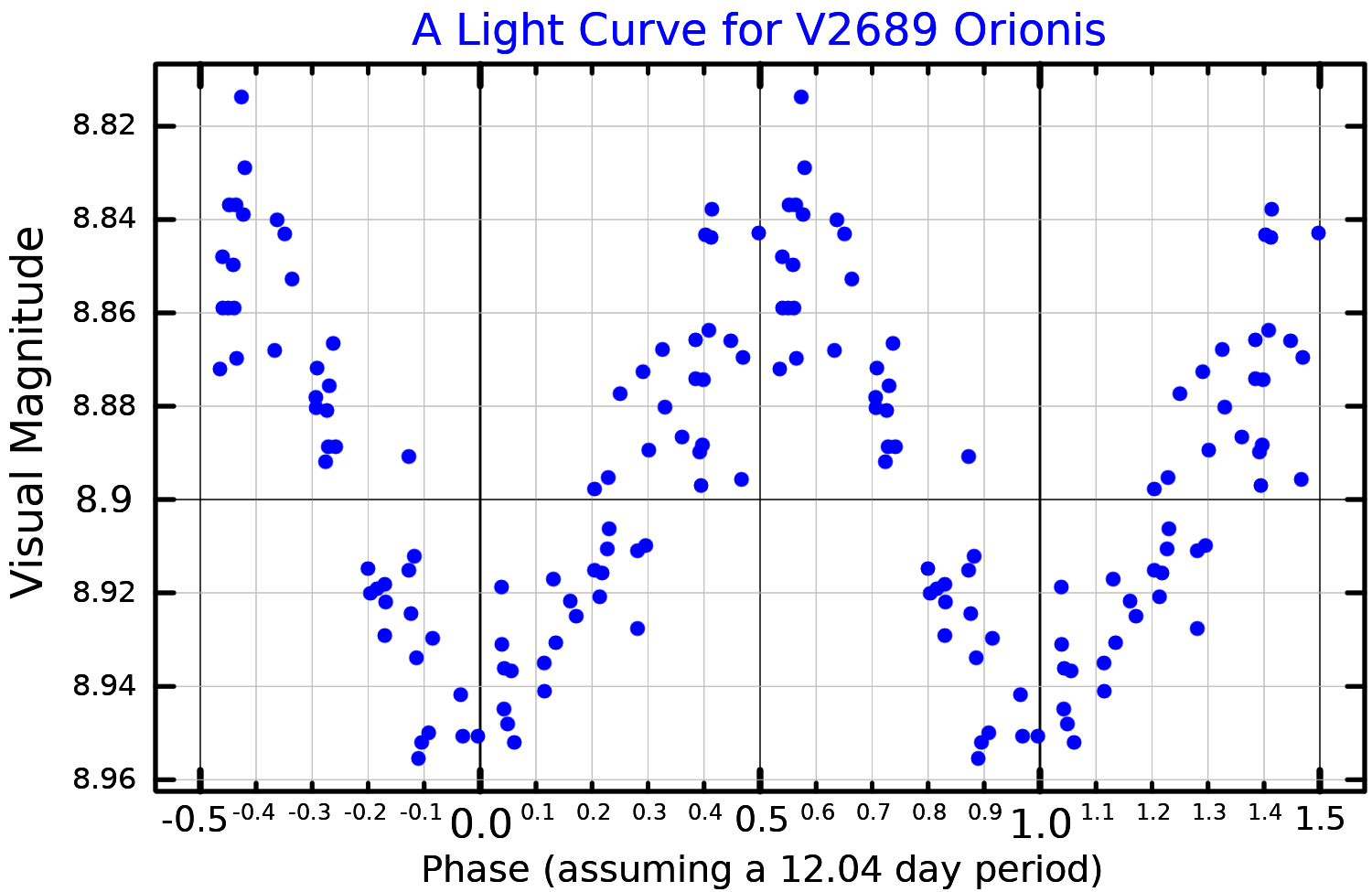
- A visual band light curve for V2689 Orionis, adapted from Kiraga (2012)

Observation data Epoch J2000 Equinox ICRS
- Constellation: Orion
- Right ascension: 05^{h} 36^{m} 30.991^{s}
- Declination: +11° 19′ 40.33″
- Apparent magnitude (V): 8.80 - 9.05

Characteristics
- Spectral type: M0.0 Ve
- Variable type: RS CVn

Astrometry
Radial velocity (R_{v})	21.772 km/s
Proper motion (μ)	RA: −2.811 ± 0.080 mas/yr Dec.: −56.368 ± 0.060 mas/yr
Parallax (π)	87.66±0.29 mas
Distance	37.2 ± 0.1 ly (11.41 ± 0.04 pc)
Absolute magnitude (M_{V})	8.6

Details
Mass	0.646 M_{☉}
Radius	0.601 R_{☉}
Luminosity	0.08 L_{☉}
Temperature	3,966 K
Metallicity [Fe/H]	+0.05 dex
Age	2.7 Gyr

Other designations
- Gliese 208, Gj 208, V2689 Orionis, BD+11°878, HIP 26335, HD 245409, TYC 709-63-1, SAO 94695

Database references
SIMBAD	data

Gliese 208 (Gj 208) is a red dwarf star with an apparent magnitude of 8.9. It is 37 light years away in the constellation of Orion. It is an extremely wide binary with 2MASS J0536+1117, an M4 star 2.6 arcminutes away (at least 0.028 light years)

The spectral type of Gj 208 has variously been described between K6 and M1. Two of the most recent observations give a statistically calculated spectral type of K7.9 or a more traditional classification of M0.0 Ve. It is a cool dwarf star and probably a spectroscopic binary.

Calculations from 2010 suggest that this star passed as close as 1.537 parsecs (5.0 light-years) from the Sun about 500,000 years ago.

GJ 208 is an RS Canum Venaticorum variable, close binary systems which show small amplitude brightness changes caused by chromospheric activity. Its visual magnitude varies by about a quarter magnitude with a period of 12.285 days.
