= HD 98618 =

Star in the Ursa Major constellation

Observation data Epoch J2000.0 Equinox ICRS
- Constellation: Ursa Major
- Right ascension: 11^{h} 21^{m} 29.0695^{s}
- Declination: +58° 29′ 03.7043″
- Apparent magnitude (V): 7.65

Characteristics
- Spectral type: G5V
- B−V color index: 0.642±0.007

Astrometry
Radial velocity (R_{v})	+7.10±0.09 km/s
Proper motion (μ)	RA: 41.329±0.057 mas/yr Dec.: 28.415±0.076 mas/yr
Parallax (π)	24.2400±0.0486 mas
Distance	134.6 ± 0.3 ly (41.25 ± 0.08 pc)
Absolute magnitude (M_{V})	4.78±0.09

Orbit
Period (P)	790+280 −150 yr
Semi-major axis (a)	100+22 −13 au
Eccentricity (e)	0.34+0.30 −0.23
Inclination (i)	55+5 −13°

Details

A
Mass	1.138+0.057 −0.056 M_{☉}
Radius	1.034±0.037 R_{☉}
Luminosity	1.10+0.19 −0.16 L_{☉}
Surface gravity (log g)	4.37 cgs
Temperature	5,812 K
Metallicity [Fe/H]	0.03 dex
Rotational velocity (v sin i)	2.1 km/s
Age	4.9+2.6 −2.9 Gyr

B
Mass	0.470+0.030 −0.029 M_{☉}

Other designations
- BD+59°1369, HD 98618, HIP 55459, SAO 27996

Database references
SIMBAD	data

HD 98618 is a binary star in the northern circumpolar constellation of Ursa Major. It is invisible to the naked eye, having an apparent visual magnitude of just 7.65. Based on parallax measurements, this system is located at a distance of 135 light years from the Sun based on parallax, and is drifting further away with a radial velocity of +7.1 km/s. It is a likely member of the thin disk population and is orbiting the Milky Way at about the same distance from the Galactic Center as the Sun.

The stellar classification of HD 98618 A is G5V, which matches an ordinary G-type main-sequence star that is generating energy through hydrogen fusion in the core region. It is almost identical in most respects to the Sun; it has therefore been proposed as a candidate solar twin. However, like the solar twin 18 Scorpii, HD 98618 has a lithium abundance significantly higher than that of the Sun ([Li/H] = +0.45 ± 0.08). Meléndez & Ramírez (2007) have suggested that HD 98618 be considered a "quasi solar twin", since they have now identified a solar twin, HIP 56948, with lithium content identical within the observational error to the Sun's.

The companion was identified in 2020 with data from the Gaia spacecraft. It has a mass of 0.470 solar masses. The two components orbit around each other with a period of roughly 800 years and a semi-major axis of 100 astronomical units.

The star appears roughly the same age as the Sun, although the level of chromospheric activity suggests it may be older. It is rotating with a leisurely projected rotational velocity of 2.1 km/s. The mass and size of the star are a few percent higher than the Sun. It is radiating around 10% more luminosity than the Sun from its photosphere at an effective temperature of 5,812 K.
