= HD 111031 =

Double star in the constellation Corvus

Observation data Epoch J2000.0 Equinox ICRS
- Constellation: Corvus
- Right ascension: 12^{h} 46^{m} 30.84207^{s}
- Declination: −11° 48′ 44.7902″
- Apparent magnitude (V): 6.87

Characteristics
- Evolutionary stage: subgiant
- Spectral type: G5 V
- B−V color index: 0.695±0.001

Astrometry
Radial velocity (R_{v})	−20.24±0.12 km/s
Proper motion (μ)	RA: −279.627(24) mas/yr Dec.: 46.791(19) mas/yr
Parallax (π)	32.0310±0.0219 mas
Distance	101.83 ± 0.07 ly (31.22 ± 0.02 pc)
Absolute magnitude (M_{V})	4.42

Orbit
Semi-major axis (a)	21.1±0.6 AU
Eccentricity (e)	0.71±0.01
Inclination (i)	137+4 −3°
Longitude of the node (Ω)	325+2 −1°
Argument of periastron (ω) (secondary)	42+3 −2°

Details

HD 111031 A
Mass	1.02 M_{☉}
Radius	1.25 R_{☉}
Luminosity	1.51 L_{☉}
Surface gravity (log g)	4.25 cgs
Temperature	5,725 K
Metallicity [Fe/H]	0.330±0.105 dex
Rotational velocity (v sin i)	1.728±0.273 km/s
Age	5.036+1.124 −1.092 Gyr

HD 111031 B
Mass	0.129±0.003 M_{☉}

Other designations
- 50 G. Corvi, BD−11°3361, GJ 3746, HD 111031, HIP 62345, SAO 157502, LTT 4887

Database references
SIMBAD	data

HD 111031 (50 G. Corvi) is a double star in the southern constellation of Corvus. With an apparent visual magnitude of 6.87, it is considered too faint to be readily visible to the naked eye. The distance to this star is 102 light years, but it is drifting closer to the Sun with a radial velocity of −20 km/s. It has an absolute magnitude of 4.42. The star has a relatively large proper motion, traversing the celestial sphere at an angular rate of 0.289 arcsec yr^{−1}.

This object is a solar analog with a stellar classification of G5 V; a G-type main-sequence star like the Sun that is generating energy through core hydrogen fusion. It is around five billion years old and is chromospherically inactive, with a projected rotational velocity of 1.7 km/s. The star has 1.0 times the mass and 1.25 times the radius of the Sun. It is radiating 1.5 times the Sun's luminosity from its photosphere at an effective temperature of 5,725 K.

In 2020, a stellar companion was identified using high-contrast imaging. The study authors deem this most likely a K-type main-sequence star with a class of K5V, an angular separation of 1″ along a position angle (PA) of 300° corresponding to a projected separation of 30 AU, and around 11–15% of the mass of the Sun. An independent study published in 2021 identified a companion through speckle imaging. They propose this is a faint red dwarf with a class of M6 or later and a visual magnitude difference of 7.9 or more compared to the primary. It is located at a separation of 1.06″ along a PA of 121°, as of 2021.

A 2022 study claimed the presence of a brown dwarf companion to this star based on radial velocity and astrometry observations, but according to a 2023 follow-up study this was in fact a detection of the previously known stellar companion, poorly characterized due to the baseline of observations being much shorter than the companion's orbital period.
