= HD 138573 =

Star in the constellation of Serpens

Observation data Epoch J2000 Equinox J2000
- Constellation: Serpens
- Right ascension: 15^{h} 32^{m} 43.653^{s}
- Declination: +10° 58′ 05.88″
- Apparent magnitude (V): 7.22

Characteristics
- Evolutionary stage: Main sequence
- Spectral type: G5 IV-V
- B−V color index: 0.656

Astrometry
Radial velocity (R_{v})	−35.67±0.12 km/s
Proper motion (μ)	RA: −5.880 mas/yr Dec.: 158.609 mas/yr
Parallax (π)	33.1373±0.0240 mas
Distance	98.43 ± 0.07 ly (30.18 ± 0.02 pc)
Absolute magnitude (M_{V})	4.82

Details
Mass	0.98±0.01 M_{☉}
Radius	1.038±0.021 R_{☉}
Luminosity	0.994±0.005 L_{☉}
Surface gravity (log g)	4.41±0.01 cgs
Temperature	5,740±3 K
Metallicity [Fe/H]	−0.024±0.003 dex
Rotational velocity (v sin i)	1.30 km/s
Age	6.50+0.29 −0.42 Gyr

Other designations
- BD+11 2816, HD 138573, HIP 76114, SAO 101603

Database references
SIMBAD	data

HD 138573 is a G-type main-sequence star in the constellation Serpens, class G5IV-V, roughly 98.4 light-years (30.2 parsecs) from Earth. This is a solar twin, with nearly the same characteristics of the Sun. It is more active than the Sun.

Mahdi et al. (2016) named the star the best solar twin candidate out of their dataset of around 2,800 candidates.

== Sun comparison ==
Chart compares the Sun to HD 138573.

Identifier	J2000 Coordinates		Distance (ly)	Stellar Class	Temperature (K)	Metallicity (dex)	Age (Gyr)	Notes
Identifier	Right ascension	Declination	Distance (ly)	Stellar Class	Temperature (K)	Metallicity (dex)	Age (Gyr)	Notes
Sun	—	—	0.00	G2V	5,778	+0.00	4.6	
HD 138573	15^{h} 32^{m} 43.7^{s}	+10° 58′ 06″	98	G5IV-V	5,740	−0.024	6.5	

== See also ==
- HD 192699
- HD 210702
