= HD 172051 =

Star in the constellation Sagittarius

Observation data Epoch J2000 Equinox ICRS
- Constellation: Sagittarius
- Right ascension: 18^{h} 38^{m} 53.40151^{s}
- Declination: −21° 03′ 06.7415″
- Apparent magnitude (V): 5.85

Characteristics
- Spectral type: G5 V
- B−V color index: 0.68

Astrometry
| Radial velocity (R_{v}) | +37.14±0.20 km/s |
| Proper motion (μ) | RA: −75.128±0.163 mas/yr Dec.: −153.645±0.150 mas/yr |
| Parallax (π) | 76.6355±0.1082 mas |
| Distance | 42.56 ± 0.06 ly (13.05 ± 0.02 pc) |
| Absolute magnitude (M_{V}) | 5.27 |

Details
| Mass | 0.865 or 1.00 M_{☉} |
| Radius | 0.90 R_{☉} |
| Surface gravity (log g) | 4.65 cgs |
| Temperature | 5,638 K |
| Metallicity [Fe/H] | –0.21 dex |
| Rotational velocity (v sin i) | 0.32 km/s |
| Age | 4.1–4.8 Gyr |

Other designations
- 86 G. Sagittarii, BD−21° 5081, GJ 722, HD 172051, HIP 91438, HR 6998, SAO 187086, WDS J18389-2103AB

Database references
| SIMBAD | data |

HD 172051 (86 G. Sagittarii) is a single, yellow-hued star in the southern constellation of Sagittarius. The star is barely bright enough to be seen with the naked eye, having an apparent visual magnitude of 5.85. Based upon an annual parallax shift of 76.64 mas, it is located some 43 light years from the Sun. It is moving away from the Sun with a radial velocity of +37 km/s.

This ordinary G-type main-sequence star is considered a solar analog, having physical properties sufficiently similar to the Sun. It has a stellar classification of G5 V and is around 4.5 billion years old. The mass is similar to the Sun, although it is cooler and has a lower luminosity. Due to this similarity, HD 172051 has been selected as an early target star for both the Terrestrial Planet Finder and Darwin missions, which seek to find an Earth-like extrasolar planet. During a search for brown dwarf companions using the Hale Telescope in 2004, two candidate companions were identified at angular separations of 5″ and 6″. However, these were determined to be background stars.

== Sources ==
- "HD 172051". SIMBAD. Centre de données astronomiques de Strasbourg.
- "HD 172051 / HR 6998". SolStation. Archived from the original on December 2, 2003.
