= Hillenbrand =

Hillenbrand is a surname. Notable people with the surname, including von Hillenbrand, include:

- Carole Hillenbrand (born 1943), British Islamic scholar
- Laura Hillenbrand, author of Seabiscuit: An American Legend
- Lynne Hillenbrand (born 1967), American astronomer
- Nico Hillenbrand, German footballer
- Rick Hillenbrand, American politician
- Robert Hillenbrand, (born 1941), British art historian
- Shea Hillenbrand, Major League Baseball player

== See also ==
- Hillenbrand Industries, holding company that changed its name to Hill-Rom on 1 April 2008.
