= HIP 11915 =

Star in the constellation Cetus

Observation data Epoch J2000 Equinox ICRS
- Constellation: Cetus
- Right ascension: 02^{h} 33^{m} 49.026^{s}
- Declination: −19° 36′ 42.500″
- Apparent magnitude (V): 8.58

Characteristics
- Evolutionary stage: Main sequence
- Spectral type: G5V

Astrometry
Radial velocity (R_{v})	14.45±0.14 km/s
Proper motion (μ)	RA: +223.559 mas/yr Dec.: +35.513 mas/yr
Parallax (π)	18.6292±0.0224 mas
Distance	175.1 ± 0.2 ly (53.68 ± 0.06 pc)
Absolute magnitude (M_{V})	4.83

Details
Mass	0.991±0.003 M_{☉}
Radius	0.974±0.001 R_{☉}
Luminosity	1.0+0.13 −0.12 L_{☉}
Surface gravity (log g)	4.47±0.008 cgs
Temperature	5773±2 K
Metallicity [Fe/H]	−0.057±0.003 dex
Rotation	27.4+1.2 −7.9 days
Rotational velocity (v sin i)	0.99±0.15 km/s
Age	3.87±0.39 Gyr

Other designations
- BD−20°481, HD 16008, HIP 11915, SAO 148468

Database references
SIMBAD	data

HIP 11915 is a G-type main-sequence star located about 175 light-years from Earth in the constellation Cetus. It is considered a solar twin, having very similar characteristics to those of the Sun, including mass, radius, temperature, metallicity and age. (Note: An exact solar twin would be a G2V star with a 5778 K temperature, an age of 4.6 billion years old, the same metallicity, and a 0.1% solar luminosity variation.) It has a planetary companion, HIP 11915 b, which has a mass and orbital distance similar to that of Jupiter.

With an apparent magnitude of 8.6, it cannot be seen with the unaided eye, but can be observed with binoculars.

== Stellar characteristics ==
HIP 11915 is a G-type main sequence star which has approximately the same mass, radius, luminosity, and temperature as the Sun. It is slightly younger than the Sun, at 3.87 billion years old.

The star is slightly poor in metals, with a metallicity ([Fe/H]) of about −0.057, or about 88% of the amount of iron and other heavier metals found in the Sun. The elemental abundance pattern of this star shows clear odd-even effect, where elements with even atomic number are more abundant than odd-number elements. The odd-even effect of this star is slightly different than the Sun's, indicating a different supernova enrichment history.

== Planetary system ==
The HIP 11915 planetary system
Companion (in order from star)	Mass	Semimajor axis (AU)	Orbital period (days)	Eccentricity	Inclination (°)	Radius
b	≥0.99±0.06 M_{J}	4.8±0.1	3830±150	0.10±0.07	—	—

In 2015, a study reported the detection of a planet orbiting HIP 11915 in a low eccentricity, 3800-day period orbit. This discovery was made using the High Accuracy Radial Velocity Planet Searcher instrument mounted on the European Southern Observatory's 3.6-meter telescope, located at La Silla Observatory in Chile. With a minimum mass and orbit similar to that of Jupiter, it has been called a "Jupiter twin". While the paper was unable to rule out stellar activity cycles, which could mimic planetary signals, it suggests the signal is more likely to be a planet.

The radial velocity data also indicates that there is no gas giant in this system with an orbital period of less than 1000 days. This means that there could be one or more terrestrial planets in the inner parts of the system, and the possibility of a habitable Earth-like planet.
