= HD 129357 =

G-type star in the constellation Boötes

Observation data Epoch J2000 Equinox ICRS
- Constellation: Boötes
- Right ascension: 14^{h} 41^{m} 22.401^{s}
- Declination: +29° 03′ 31.70″
- Apparent magnitude (V): 7.823

Characteristics
- Evolutionary stage: main sequence
- Spectral type: G2V
- U−B color index: +0.115
- B−V color index: +0.635

Astrometry
Radial velocity (R_{v})	−33.2 km/s
Proper motion (μ)	RA: +12.418 mas/yr Dec.: −159.824 mas/yr
Parallax (π)	21.0587±0.0264 mas
Distance	154.9 ± 0.2 ly (47.49 ± 0.06 pc)
Absolute magnitude (M_{V})	+4.49

Details
Mass	1.00±0.06 M_{☉}
Radius	1.3 R_{☉}
Luminosity	1.5 L_{☉}
Surface gravity (log g)	4.16±0.13 cgs
Temperature	5,749±47 K
Metallicity [Fe/H]	−0.02±0.04 dex
Rotational velocity (v sin i)	2 km/s
Age	8.1 Gyr

Other designations
- BD+29 2568, HIP 71813, PPM 103504, SAO 83469

Database references
SIMBAD	data

HD 129357 is a G-type main-sequence star in the constellation Boötes that is located about 154 light years from the Sun. The measured properties of this star are very similar to those of the Sun, making it a candidate solar twin. However, it has a lower abundance of lithium than the Sun and appears to be over 3 billion years older, so it may instead be a solar analog.

It was suggested by astronomer Olin Eggen that HD 129357 is a member of the Wolf 630 moving group of stars that share a common motion through space. The space velocity components of HD 129357 are (U, V, W) = (+21.3, −36.3, −32.0).
