= HD 117939 =

Star in the constellation Centaurus

Observation data Epoch J2000 Equinox ICRS
- Constellation: Centaurus
- Right ascension: 13^{h} 34^{m} 32.64979^{s}
- Declination: −38° 54′ 25.9678″
- Apparent magnitude (V): 7.29

Characteristics
- Evolutionary stage: Main sequence
- Spectral type: G4V
- B−V color index: 0.669±0.006

Astrometry
Radial velocity (R_{v})	+82.23±0.12 km/s
Proper motion (μ)	RA: +445.183 mas/yr Dec.: −393.880 mas/yr
Parallax (π)	33.1088±0.0267 mas
Distance	98.51 ± 0.08 ly (30.20 ± 0.02 pc)
Absolute magnitude (M_{V})	4.90

Details
Mass	0.92 M_{☉}
Radius	1.01±0.04 R_{☉}
Luminosity	1.00 L_{☉}
Surface gravity (log g)	4.43 cgs
Temperature	5,690 K
Metallicity [Fe/H]	−0.22±0.07 dex
Rotation	2.18 days
Rotational velocity (v sin i)	1.0±1.0 km/s
Age	6.1 Gyr

Other designations
- CD−38°8635, GJ 9450, HD 117939, HIP 66238, SAO 204606, LHS 2760

Database references
SIMBAD	data

HD 117939 is a Sun-like star in the southern constellation of Centaurus. With an apparent visual magnitude of 7.29 it is too faint to be viewed with the naked eye, but is within the range of binoculars or a small telescope. It is located at a distance of 98.5 light years from the Sun based on parallax measurements, and is drifting further away with a radial velocity of +82 km/s. This is an intermediate disk star with a high proper motion, traversing the celestial sphere at an angular rate of 0.68 arcsec yr^{−1}.

An ordinary G-type main-sequence star with a stellar classification of G4V, this star is an "excellent photometric match for the Sun"; the atmospheric properties of the star make it a near solar twin. It is older than the sun at 6.1 billion years, but is more chromospherically active.

To date no exact solar twin (precisely matching all important properties of the Sun) has been found. However, there are some stars that come very close to being identical to the Sun, and as such are dubbed solar twins by astronomers. An exact solar twin would be a 4.6 billion years old G2V star with a 5,772K temperature, the correct metallicity, and a 0.1% solar luminosity variation. G2V stars with an age of 4.6 billion years or more have typically reached their most stable state. Proper metallicity and size are also important to low luminosity variation.

== Sun comparison ==
Chart compares the sun to HD 117939.

Identifier	Stellar Class	Temperature (K)	Metallicity (dex)	Age (Gyr)	Notes
Sun	G2V	5,778	+0.00	4.6	
HD 117939	G4V	5,765	−0.22	6.1	

== See also ==
- List of nearest stars
