= HD 162826 =

Star in the constellation of Hercules

- Location of HD 162826 in the constellation Hercules

Observation data Epoch J2000 Equinox ICRS
- Constellation: Hercules
- Right ascension: 17^{h} 51^{m} 14.02244^{s}
- Declination: +40° 04′ 20.8772″
- Apparent magnitude (V): 6.55±0.01

Characteristics
- Evolutionary stage: main sequence
- Spectral type: F8 V
- U−B color index: +0.04
- B−V color index: +0.52

Astrometry
Radial velocity (R_{v})	1.9±0.1 km/s
Proper motion (μ)	RA: −16.864 mas/yr Dec.: +9.833 mas/yr
Parallax (π)	30.068±0.0646 mas
Distance	108.5 ± 0.2 ly (33.26 ± 0.07 pc)
Absolute magnitude (M_{V})	+3.92

Details
Mass	1.17 M_{☉}
Radius	1.32±0.04 R_{☉}
Luminosity	2.27 L_{☉}
Surface gravity (log g)	4.28^{+0.02}_{−0.03} cgs
Temperature	6,158±9 K
Metallicity [Fe/H]	+0.02±0.04 dex
Rotational velocity (v sin i)	5 km/s
Age	4.5 Gyr

Other designations
- AG+40°1628, BD+40°3225, GC 24279, HD 162826, HIP 87382, HR 6669, SAO 47009, TYC 3093-1946-1, 2MASS J17511402+4004208

Database references
SIMBAD	data

HD 162826 (HR 6669, HIP 87382) is a star in the constellation Hercules. It is about 110 light-years (34 parsecs) away from Earth. With an apparent magnitude of 6.55, the star can be found with binoculars or a low-power telescope by reference to nearby Vega in the constellation Lyra.

The star is considered to be a stellar sibling of the Sun and is the first such sibling to be discovered. Solar siblings are those stars that formed from the same gas cloud and in the same star cluster; the term was introduced in 2009. No planets have been detected orbiting HD 162826. However, due to its metallicity, it is likely to harbor terrestrial planets; the star's spectra had been under observation previously.

In November 2018, a second potential solar twin was announced: HD 186302, an 8th magnitude star in the constellation Pavo, but this star’s status as a solar twin is disputed.

== Origin ==
In May 2014, astronomers at the University of Texas at Austin announced that HD 162826 is "almost certainly" one of what may be thousands of siblings of the Sun, emerging from the same stellar nursery some 4.5 billion years ago. This conclusion was reached by determining it has the same chemical composition as the Sun, including rare elements such as barium and yttrium, and by determining its orbit and projecting backward its revolutions about the Galactic Center. However, other papers dispute this finding and give an extremely low probability of HD 162826 being a solar sibling.

The cluster in which HD 162826 and the Sun formed is believed to have been an open cluster, permitting the stars to scatter widely over time. The stars in this cluster were not too closely packed during their formation to disrupt planetary disk development, but were not so far apart as to prevent the seeding of Earth with radioactive elements produced by a nearby supernova.

The discovery of a first solar sibling by searching for specific rare elements may make it easier to identify other siblings in the future. However, HD 162826 is probably the nearest solar sibling, because others would have been identified first if they had been closer to the Sun. It had not been expected that even one sibling would be found at this relatively short distance; the study that identified this star worked on a dataset of only 100,000 stars, to prepare to receive data about billions of stars expected from the Gaia Space Telescope in five to ten years.

== Possible planets and habitability ==
HD 162826 has no known planets. The current state of knowledge excludes hot Jupiters and suggests that a more distant "Jupiter" is unlikely, but terrestrial planets are possible.

The star is of spectral type F8V, meaning it is somewhat larger and hotter than the Sun. Any habitable Earthlike planets would have to orbit farther out, at roughly the distance of Mars from the Sun.

Lead researcher Ivan Ramirez explained the significance of finding solar siblings:

"We want to know where we were born. If we can figure out in what part of the galaxy the Sun formed, we can constrain conditions on the early Solar System. That could help us understand why we are here."

He suggested a "small, but not zero" chance that planets with life might orbit solar sibling stars, because during the frequent collisions during planetary formation material might have travelled from one system to another. He said the siblings might be "key candidates" in the search for extraterrestrial life. A scenario for transfer of life by this means might require life or a precursor molecule to be shielded from radiation for millions of years, dormant within an outgoing chunk of planetary debris a meter or more in diameter that is produced by a meteorite impact, until this new meteorite impacts on a different planet. Such an unlikely event might have transferred life from another planet to Earth or vice versa.

== See also ==
- Star cluster
- Solar analog
- HD 186302
