= Psi Serpentis =

Triple star system in the constellation Serpens

- Location of ψ Serpentis (circled in red)

Observation data Epoch J2000.0 Equinox J2000.0 (ICRS)
- Constellation: Serpens
- Right ascension: 15^{h} 44^{m} 01.82075^{s}
- Declination: +02° 30′ 54.6340″
- Apparent magnitude (V): 5.84 + 12.00

Characteristics
- Spectral type: G5 V + (M3 + M3)
- U−B color index: +0.23
- B−V color index: +0.68

Astrometry
Radial velocity (R_{v})	+17.93±0.89 km/s
Proper motion (μ)	RA: −43.11 mas/yr Dec.: −143.57 mas/yr
Parallax (π)	68.22±0.66 mas
Distance	47.8 ± 0.5 ly (14.7 ± 0.1 pc)
Absolute magnitude (M_{V})	+5.03

Orbit
Primary	ψ Ser A
Name	ψ Ser B
Period (P)	900 yr
Semi-major axis (a)	7.20″
Eccentricity (e)	0.435±0.030
Inclination (i)	138.1±1.5°
Longitude of the node (Ω)	54.9±7.4°
Periastron epoch (T)	B 1936.1±9.9
Argument of periastron (ω) (secondary)	330.9±3.4°

Orbit
Primary	ψ Ser Ba
Name	ψ Ser Bb
Period (P)	6.57±0.29 yr
Semi-major axis (a)	0.189±0.008″
Eccentricity (e)	0.357±0.038
Inclination (i)	70.4°
Longitude of the node (Ω)	21.4±2.7°
Periastron epoch (T)	B 2020.09±0.08
Argument of periastron (ω) (secondary)	230.0±9.3°

Details

ψ Ser A
Mass	0.995±0.030 M_{☉}
Radius	0.950±0.024 R_{☉}
Luminosity	0.837±0.033 L_{☉}
Surface gravity (log g)	4.47±0.04 cgs
Temperature	5,667±91 K
Metallicity [Fe/H]	0.036±0.006 dex
Rotational velocity (v sin i)	11.01 km/s
Age	3.2 Gyr

ψ Ser Ba
Mass	0.26 M_{☉}

ψ Ser Bb
Mass	0.24 M_{☉}

Other designations
- ψ Ser, 23 Ser, BD+02°2989, FK5 3248, GJ 9527, HD 140538, HIP 77052, HR 5853, SAO 121152

Database references
SIMBAD	data

Psi Serpentis (ψ Ser, ψ Serpentis) is a triple star system within the Serpens Caput part of the equatorial constellation Serpens. Based upon an annual parallax shift of 68.22 mas as seen from Earth, it is located approximately 47.8 light years from the Sun. This system came closest approach to the Sun about 585,000 years ago when it made perihelion passage at an estimated distance of 23.27 ly (7.134 pc). Psi Serpentis is faintly visible to the naked eye with an apparent visual magnitude of 5.84.

This system can be resolved into two components that orbit each other with a period of 528.79 years and an eccentricity of 0.146. The primary, component A, is a yellow-hued G-type main sequence star with a stellar classification of G5 V. It is a solar analog, but its physical properties differ enough from the Sun to not be considered a solar twin. The star has an estimated 99.5% of the mass of the Sun and 0.95 times the Sun's radius. It is radiating 84% of the solar luminosity from its photosphere at an effective temperature of 5,667 K.

When observed from 1997 through 2000, the primary component appeared to be transitioning from a maunder minimum state to a state of cycling magnetic activity. It has developed a four-year activity cycle. During the period 2000–2004, it showed a strong activity cycle with little correlation between photometric variation and surface activity. This was followed by a flatter activity cycle from 2004 to 2008 that showed an inverse brightness variation with the level of activity. The difference in the two cycles may indicate a change from faculae-dominated to star spot-dominated variations in luminosity.

The known secondary, component B, is magnitude 12.00 and lies at an angular separation of 4.6 arc seconds from the primary along a position angle of 18°, as of 2013. In 2015, this component was resolved via interferometry into a binary star system with a separation of 0.22 arc seconds, corresponding to a projected separation of 3 AU. Both components, Ba and Bb, are likely red dwarfs roughly of class M3 with masses close to a quarter of that of the Sun. Their orbital period is estimated to be 6.57 years, and the eccentricity is moderately high, at 0.357. The orbit of Ba and Bb is not coplanar to their orbit around A.
