= HD 197027 =

Star in the constellation Capricornus

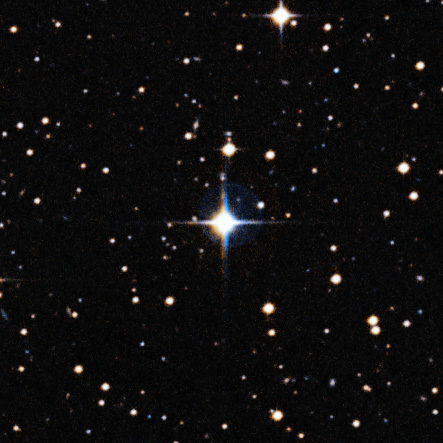
- HIP 102152; Credit: ESO/Digitized Sky Survey 2

Observation data Epoch J2000.0 Equinox ICRS
- Constellation: Capricornus
- Right ascension: 20^{h} 41^{m} 54.6336^{s}
- Declination: −27° 12′ 57.415″
- Apparent magnitude (V): 9.15±0.02

Characteristics
- Evolutionary stage: main sequence
- Spectral type: G3 V
- U−B color index: +0.30
- B−V color index: +0.65

Astrometry
Radial velocity (R_{v})	−43.9±0.3 km/s
Proper motion (μ)	RA: +175.628 mas/yr Dec.: −15.593 mas/yr
Parallax (π)	12.7715±0.0164 mas
Distance	255.4 ± 0.3 ly (78.3 ± 0.1 pc)
Absolute magnitude (M_{V})	4.74

Details
Mass	0.97 M_{☉}
Radius	1.08^{+0.07}_{−0.05} R_{☉}
Luminosity	1.19 L_{☉}
Surface gravity (log g)	4.40±0.02 cgs
Temperature	5718±5 K
Metallicity [Fe/H]	−0.020±0.005 dex
Rotational velocity (v sin i)	1.78±0.12 km/s
Age	6.92±0.69 Gyr

Other designations
- CD−27°14976, CPD−27°7079, HD 197027, HIP 102152, SAO 189585

Database references
SIMBAD	data

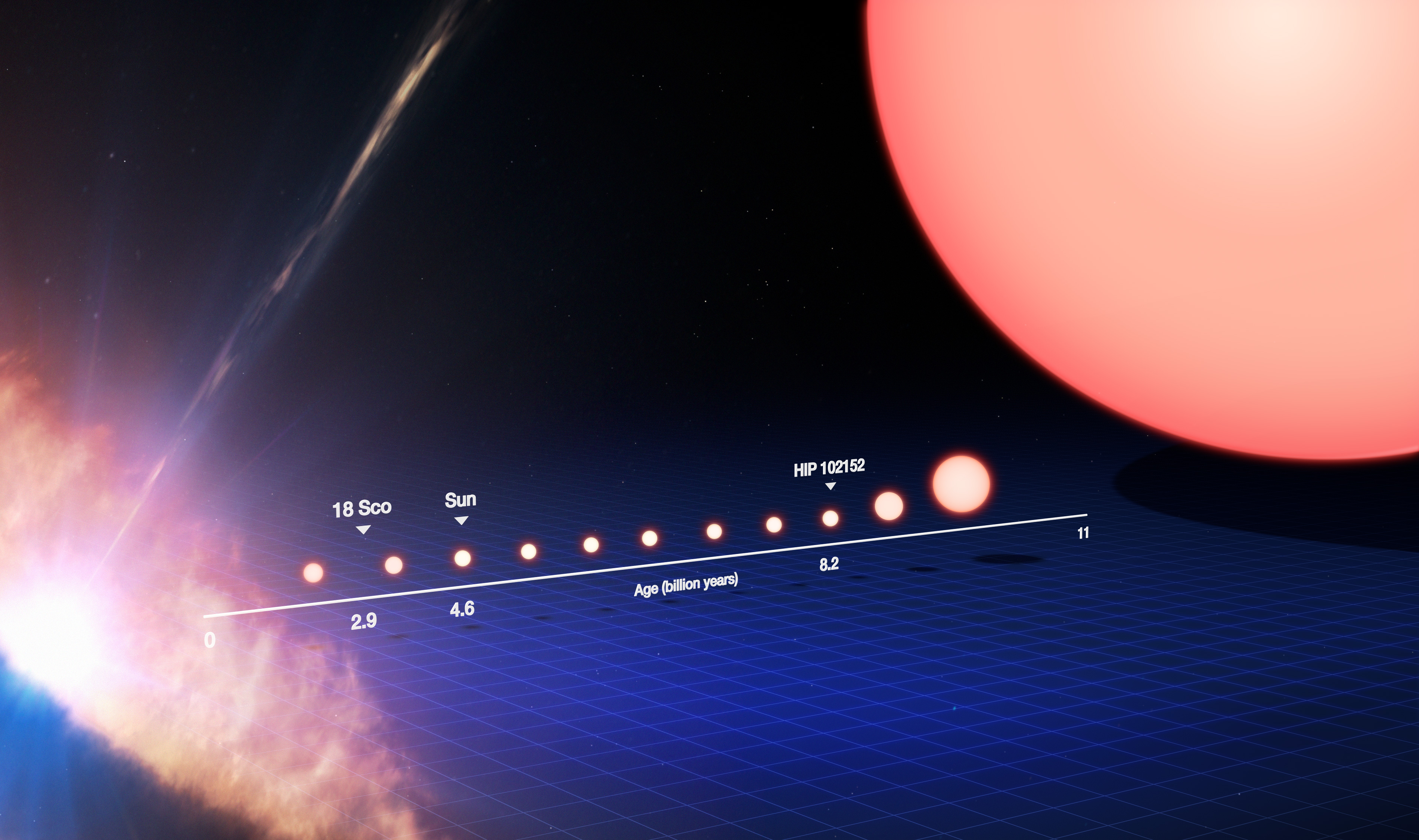
The age of HD 197027, here annotated as HIP 102152, shown relative to the Sun, the younger solar twin 18 Scorpii and the formation of the Milky Way

HD 197027 (HIP 102152) is a star in the constellation Capricornus. It has an apparent magnitude of 9.15, making it readily visible through a telescope but not to the naked eye. The object is located at a distance of 255 light years but is approaching the Solar System with a heliocentric radial velocity of −44 km/s.

HD 197027 has a stellar classification of G3 V, indicating that it is an ordinary G-type main-sequence star like the Sun. It has only 97% the mass of the Sun but 108% of its radius. It shines at 119% the luminosity of the Sun from its photosphere at an effective temperature of 5,718 K, similar to the Sun's 5,778 K. HD 197027's metallicity – elements heavier than helium – is similar to the Sun. At an older age of 6.92 billion years, it spins with a projected rotational velocity of about 2 km/s.

Since its measured properties of this star are very similar to those of the Sun, it has been considered a candidate older solar twin. The abundances of 21 elements overall are more similar to the Sun than any other known solar twin. Its Iron Abundance is −0.03 with an error value of 0.02 Fe/H. (The value comes from the Hipparcos Extended Catalog.)
