= HIP 11915 b =

Extrasolar planet in the constellation Cetus

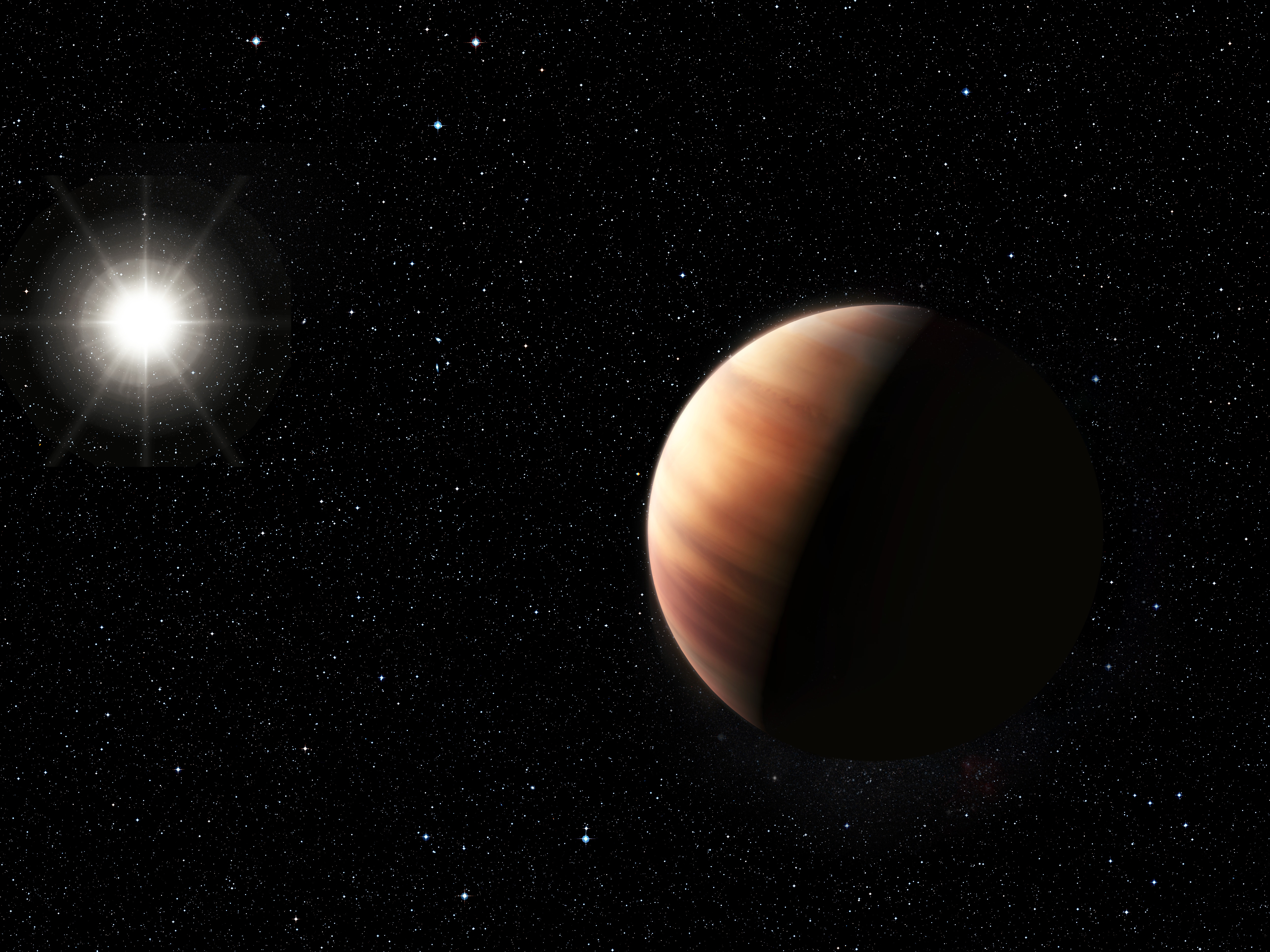
- An artist's impression of the exoplanet HIP 11915 b.

Discovery
- Discovered by: Meléndez et al.
- Discovery site: La Silla Observatory, Chile
- Discovery date: July 2015
- Detection method: HARPS

Orbital characteristics
- Semi-major axis: 4.8±0.1 AU
- Eccentricity: 0.1±0.07
- Orbital period (sidereal): 3830±150 days (10.49±0.41 years)
- Star: HIP 11915

Physical characteristics
- Mass: ≥0.99±0.06 M_{J}
- Temperature: 118 K (−155 °C; −247 °F)

HIP 11915 b is a candidate exoplanet orbiting the solar twin star HIP 11915 about 175 light-years (54 parsecs) from Earth in the constellation Cetus. It is notable as its orbit and mass are similar to that of Jupiter (essentially, a "Jupiter analog"), suggesting that its system may be similar to that of the Solar System. It orbits its star at a distance of approximately 4.8 AU.

== Discovery ==
The exoplanet was found by using the radial velocity method, where periodic Doppler shifts of spectral lines of the host star suggest an orbiting object. While the radial velocity variations are most likely caused by an orbiting planet, the discovery paper could not completely rule out the possibility that the variations are caused by the star's activity cycle, so HIP 11915 b technically remains a planet candidate.

== Physical characteristics ==
=== Mass and temperature ===
HIP 11915 b is a jovian planet, an exoplanet with a mass close to that of the planet Jupiter. It has a minimum mass of 0.99 M_{J} (315 M_{🜨}). Based on models, it is expected to have a temperature of around 118 K (−155 °C; −247 °F). (Note: This was obtained using the CalcTool luminosity converter. Using the apparent magnitude of HIP 11915 and its distance from Earth (using the uncertainty parameter of ±10 light years), this yields a range of 1.03–1.27 L_{☉}. When used in the default 190 light-year distance (with margin of error) is 1.07+0.11 −0.09 L_{☉}. When run into simulations using the orbital distance of HIP 11915 and its planet, yields a result of 118 K.) This is nearly the same as the planet Jupiter.

=== Host star ===
The host star, HIP 11915, is a G-type star that is just about the same mass of the Sun (a solar twin). It has a temperature of 5760 K, nearly the same as the Sun, which has a temperature of 5778 K. The star's age is estimated to be about 4.16 billion years old, about 440 million years younger than the Sun, which is 4.6 billion years old. The radius of the star has not been directly known, but given the same mass as the Sun, HIP 11915 likely has a radius of around 1.01 R_{☉}, making it the same size as the Sun.

The star's apparent magnitude, or how bright it appears from Earth's perspective, is 8.58. Therefore, HIP 11915 is too dim to be seen with the naked eye, but can be seen with good binoculars.

=== Orbit ===
HIP 11915 b orbits its host star with an orbital period of 10 years and an orbital radius of about 4.8 times that of Earth's (nearly the same as Jupiter, which has an orbital distance of around 5.2 AU). Its eccentricity is 0.1, slightly higher than Jupiter's, meaning it has an orbit slightly more eccentric. This would not have any effect on any residing planets near the star, though.

== Significance in astronomy ==
The discovery of HIP 11915 b marked a significant breakthrough in the astronomy news. Because of its orbital distance and mass are just about the same as Jupiter, astronomers began to predict that star systems with Jupiter-like planets at the right orbital distance could have terrestrial planets in the inner portion, like the Solar System does.

While several Jovian-sized planets have been discovered, most have been found orbiting close to their stars. It is now hypothesized that Jupiter's movement in the Solar System may have cleared the way for the rocky inner planets, including Earth, to form. The similarity extends to the star that centers the system; like the Sun, HIP 11915 is a G-class star.

=== Solar System similarities ===
According to Jorge Meléndez, who led the University of São Paulo, Brazil team that discovered HIP 11915 b, "the quest for an Earth 2.0, and for a complete Solar System 2.0, is one of the most exciting endeavors in astronomy". This means that there is the chance that HIP 11915 may have undetected terrestrial planets closer in, at a distance ranging from 0.5–1.6 AU. The possibilities even extend outwards for the chance of a habitable Earth-like planet to form around 1 AU.

Megan Bedell, from the University of Chicago and lead author of the paper, concludes: “After two decades of hunting for exoplanets, we are finally beginning to see long-period gas giant planets similar to those in our own Solar System thanks to the long-term stability of planet hunting instruments like HARPS. This discovery is, in every respect, an exciting sign that other solar systems may be out there waiting to be discovered.”

== See also ==
- Epsilon Eridani b
- HD 154345 b
