= 4391 =

4391 is a Sophie Germain prime number that is between 4390 and 4392. 4391 may also refer to:

- HD 4391, a quadruple star system in the constellation Phoenix
- 4391 Balodis, a dark and rare Erigone asteroid
