= Margaret Turnbull =

American astronomer

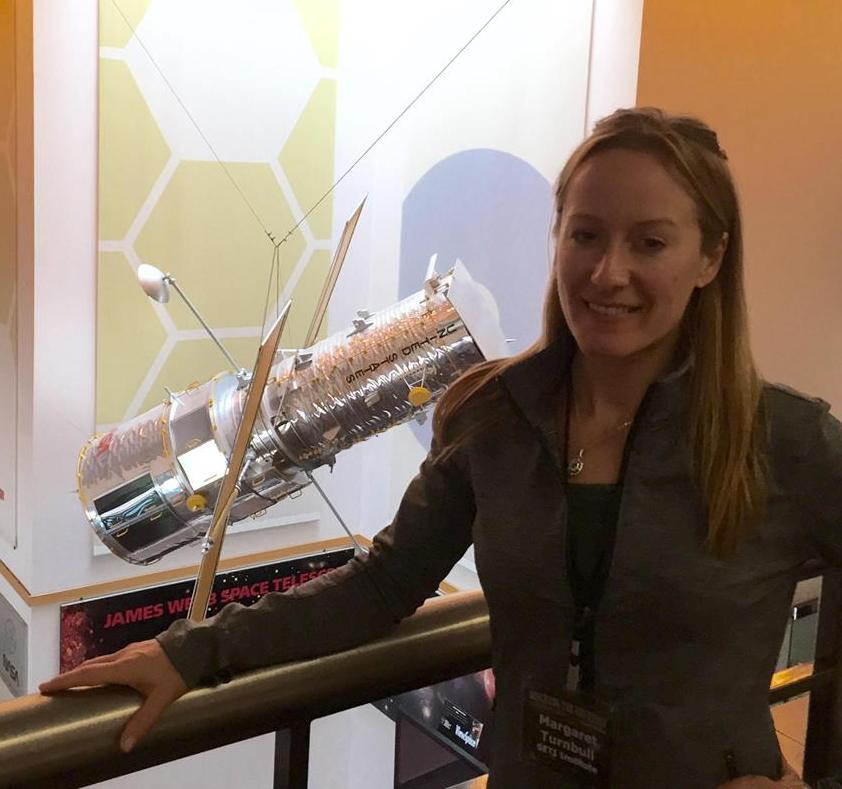
- At the Space Telescope Science Institute in 2016
- Education: University of Arizona
- Known for: Planetary habitability
- Scientific career
- Fields: Astronomy

Margaret Carol "Maggie" Turnbull (born 1975) is an American astronomer and astrobiologist. She received her PhD in Astronomy from the University of Arizona in 2004. Between 2001 and 2006 she was a part of the Virtual Planetary Laboratory. Turnbull is an authority on star systems which may have habitable planets, solar twins and planetary habitability.

Turnbull is also an expert on the use of the coronagraph in the direct detection of exoplanets. In 2002, she helped develop the HabCat with Jill Tarter, a catalog of potentially habitable stellar systems. The following year Turnbull went on to further identify 30 particularly suitable stars from the 5,000 in the HabCat list that are within 100 light years of Earth.

In 2006, Turnbull drew up two shortlists of just five stars each. The first formed the basis of SETI radio searches with the Allen Telescope Array (Beta Canum Venaticorum, HD 10307, HD 211415, 18 Scorpii, and 51 Pegasi). The second are her top candidates for the Terrestrial Planet Finder (Epsilon Indi, Epsilon Eridani, 40 Eridani, Alpha Centauri B, and Tau Ceti).

Turnbull's work has continued to be an integral component in the search for life in the universe and she regularly contributes to the discussion on how life is defined and strategies for its detection. Her previous work on target selection with the HabCat list and expertise with coronagraphs have made her an important advocate for direct exoplanet imaging missions, and she served as Science Team Leader for the New Worlds Mission. In 2016, Turnbull became a leader of a Science Investigation Team for the Wide Field Infrared Survey Telescope (renamed the Nancy Grace Roman Space Telescope), which is simulating mission data and selecting targets for the direct imaging exoplanet searches. In 2017, Turnbull worked with Stephen Kane to place constraints on the mass of Proxima Centauri b, the nearest exoplanet to the Solar System.

Asteroid 7863 Turnbull, discovered by Brian A. Skiff at Anderson Mesa Station in 1981, was named in her honor. The official naming citation was published by the Minor Planet Center on September 28, 1999 (M.P.C. 36127).

== Politics ==
In 2018, Turnbull ran for the office of Governor of Wisconsin as an independent, along with running mate Wil Losch. Turnbull received 18,779 votes (0.7%), and finished in fourth place.
