= HD 192699 =

Star in the constellation Aquila

HD 192699 / Chechia
Observation data Epoch J2000 Equinox ICRS
- Constellation: Aquila
- Right ascension: 20^{h} 16^{m} 06.00378^{s}
- Declination: +04° 34′ 50.8600″
- Apparent magnitude (V): 6.44

Characteristics
- Evolutionary stage: red giant branch
- Spectral type: G8 IV
- B−V color index: 0.867±0.006

Astrometry
Proper motion (μ)	RA: −40.884 mas/yr Dec.: −51.962 mas/yr
Parallax (π)	13.7264±0.0290 mas
Distance	237.6 ± 0.5 ly (72.9 ± 0.2 pc)
Absolute magnitude (M_{V})	2.36

Details
Mass	1.26±0.19 M_{☉}
Radius	4.41±0.21 R_{☉}
Luminosity	12.26 L_{☉}
Surface gravity (log g)	3.25 cgs
Temperature	5,041 K
Metallicity [Fe/H]	−0.12 dex
Age	3.2+1.2 −0.7 Gyr

Other designations
- Chechia, BD+04°4395, FK5 3623, HD 192699, HIP 99894, HR 7288, SAO 125628, TYC 504-2358-1, GSC 00504-02358, 2MASS J20160600+0434509

Database references
SIMBAD	data
Exoplanet Archive	data

HD 192699 is a star located approximately 238 light-years away in the constellation of Aquila. It has the apparent magnitude of 6.45. Based on its mass of 1.68 solar, it was an A-type star when it was a main-sequence. In April 2007, a planet was announced orbiting the star, together with HD 175541 b and HD 210702 b.

Although the published spectral class of G8 IV suggests that HD 192699 is a subgiant, models of the star suggest it has reached the base of the red giant branch, having developed a degenerate helium core.

The star HD 192699 is named Chechia. The name was selected in the NameExoWorlds campaign by Tunisia, during the 100th anniversary of the IAU. Chechia is a flat-surfaced, traditional red wool hat.

The HD 192699 planetary system
Companion (in order from star)	Mass	Semimajor axis (AU)	Orbital period (days)	Eccentricity	Inclination (°)	Radius
b / Khomsa	≥2.096±0.093 M_{J}	1.063±0.049	340.94±0.92	0.082±0.041	—	—

== See also ==
- HD 175541
- HD 210702
- List of extrasolar planets
