= W Herculis =

The Bayer designation w Herculis and the variable star designation W Herculis are distinct. Due to technical limitations, both designations link here. For the star

- W Herculis, see HD 149749
- w Herculis, see 72 Herculis
