= HD 143436 =

Star in the constellation Serpens

Observation data Epoch J2000 Equinox ICRS
- Constellation: Serpens
- Right ascension: 16^{h} 00^{m} 18.83721^{s}
- Declination: +00° 08′ 13.2302″
- Apparent magnitude (V): 8.03

Characteristics
- Evolutionary stage: main sequence
- Spectral type: G3V
- B−V color index: 0.644

Astrometry
Radial velocity (R_{v})	−24.7±0.7 km/s
Proper motion (μ)	RA: −136.573 mas/yr Dec.: −108.764 mas/yr
Parallax (π)	22.3995±0.0207 mas
Distance	145.6 ± 0.1 ly (44.64 ± 0.04 pc)
Absolute magnitude (M_{V})	4.87±0.10

Details
Mass	1.01±0.02 M_{☉}
Radius	1.00±0.08 R_{☉}
Luminosity	1.02±0.03 L_{☉}
Surface gravity (log g)	4.28±0.12 cgs
Temperature	5,768±43 K
Metallicity [Fe/H]	0.008 dex
Rotational velocity (v sin i)	< 2.6 km/s
Age	3.8±2.9 Gyr

Other designations
- BD+00°3441, HIP 78399, SAO 121307, PPM 162138, LTT 14757, NLTT 41715

Database references
SIMBAD	data

HD 143436 also known as HIP 78399, is a G-type star in the constellation Serpens. The temperature, rotation, mass, and abundance of elements in this star are close to properties of the Sun, and for this reason it is a solar twin candidate. The only notable difference is an approximately six times higher abundance of lithium compared to the Sun and most likely a younger age of 3.8 Gyr. The space velocity components of this star are (U, V, W) = (−19.2, −38.6, −7.0) km/s.
