= HD 150248 =

Star in the constellation of Scorpius

Observation data Epoch J2000 Equinox ICRS
- Constellation: Scorpius
- Right ascension: 16^{h} 41^{m} 49.79351^{s}
- Declination: −45° 22′ 07.5128″
- Apparent magnitude (V): 7.02

Characteristics
- Spectral type: G3V + ?
- U−B color index: +0.17
- B−V color index: +0.68

Astrometry
Proper motion (μ)	RA: +62.016 mas/yr Dec.: −93.481 mas/yr
Parallax (π)	35.958±0.0501 mas
Distance	90.7 ± 0.1 ly (27.81 ± 0.04 pc)
Absolute magnitude (M_{V})	+4.90

Orbit
Period (P)	3253.26+0.56 −0.55 days
Semi-major axis (a)	4.46+0.12 −0.13 AU
Eccentricity (e)	0.66872+0.00090 −0.00092
Inclination (i)	55.97±0.47°
Argument of periastron (ω) (secondary)	356.59±0.13°
Semi-amplitude (K_{1}) (primary)	1.993±0.002 km/s

Details

A
Mass	0.96±0.01 M_{☉}
Radius	1.02±0.02 R_{☉}
Luminosity	1.16+0.13 −0.11 L_{☉}
Surface gravity (log g)	4.37±0.01 cgs
Temperature	5,715±3 K
Metallicity [Fe/H]	−0.091±0.003 dex
Rotational velocity (v sin i)	1.43±0.12 km/s
Age	8.10+0.24 −0.39 Gyr

B
Mass	140±8 M_{Jup}

Other designations
- CD−45°10847, HD 150248, HIP 81746

Database references
SIMBAD	data

HD 150248 is a binary star system in the constellation Scorpius, close to the border with Ara. Its primary component is a G-type star, notable for being a near solar twin. HD 150248's photometric color is also very close to that of the Sun; however, it has a lower abundance of metals, and has an apparent visual magnitude of 7.02. At 8.1 billion years old, this star is over three billion years older than the Sun.

To date, no solar twin with an exact match to that of the Sun has been found. However, there are some stars that come very close to being identical, and thus considered solar twins by the astronomical community. An exact solar twin would be a G2V star with a 5772 K temperature, be 4.6 billion years old, with solar metallicity, and a 0.1% solar luminosity variation. Stars with an age of 4.6 billion years, such as the Sun, are at the most stable state. Proper metallicity and size are also very important to low luminosity variation.

Both components of this system orbit with a period of 3,253.2 days (8.907 years) and have a high eccentricity of 0.66872, putting the stars as close as 1.48 AU in the periastron, and as distant as 7.42 AU in the apoastron. A circumbinary companion would need to orbit at a separation of at least 18.4 AU to have a stable orbit. Meanwhile, for an S-type companion orbiting either A or B, this would be less than 0.446 and 0.186 AU, respectively.

== Comparison to the Sun ==
	Distance (ly)	Stellar Type	Temperature (K)	Metallicity (dex)	Age (Gyr)	Notes
Sun	0.00	G2V	5,778	+0.00	4.6	
HD 150248	90.7	G3V	5,715	−0.091	8.10	

== See also ==
- List of nearest stars
