= HIP 100963 =

Star in the constellation Vulpecula

Observation data Epoch J2000.0 Equinox J2000.0 (ICRS)
- Constellation: Vulpecula
- Right ascension: 20^{h} 28^{m} 11.8155^{s}
- Declination: +22° 07′ 44.371″
- Apparent magnitude (V): +7.088

Characteristics
- Evolutionary stage: main sequence
- Spectral type: G5
- B−V color index: +0.65
- V−R color index: +0.39
- R−I color index: +0.3

Astrometry
| Radial velocity (R_{v}) | −1.6 km/s |
| Proper motion (μ) | RA: −22.644(18) mas/yr Dec.: −244.007(20) mas/yr |
| Parallax (π) | 35.5219±0.0244 mas |
| Distance | 91.82 ± 0.06 ly (28.15 ± 0.02 pc) |
| Absolute magnitude (M_{V}) | +4.84 |

Details
| Mass | 0.998±0.006 M_{☉} |
| Radius | 0.988 R_{☉} |
| Luminosity | 0.968±0.043 L_{☉} |
| Surface gravity (log g) | 4.47 cgs |
| Temperature | 5,779±50 K |
| Metallicity [Fe/H] | −0.002 dex |
| Rotation | 12 days |
| Rotational velocity (v sin i) | 2.39 km/s |
| Age | 2.01–3.80 Gyr |

Other designations
- BD+21°4221, HD 195034, SAO 88711, PPM 111203, LTT 15980, NLTT 49310

Database references
| SIMBAD | data |

HIP 100963 is a G-type star in the faint northern constellation of Vulpecula resembling the Sun. It has an apparent visual magnitude of approximately 7.1, making it generally too faint to be seen with the naked eye in most circumstances. The distance to this star, as determined using parallax measurements from the Gaia spacecraft, is around 92 light-years (28 parsecs).

This star has a stellar classification of G5, making it a G-type star with an undetermined luminosity class. It has similar mass, temperature and chemical abundance to the Sun and was called a solar twin in a 2009 study, although its lithium abundance is three to four times that of the Sun and it is much younger. This lithium excess suggests that the star has a younger age of between 2.01 and 3.80 billion years, compared to the previous estimate of 5.13+0.00
−2.99 Gyr from a 2007 study.

== Sun comparison ==
Chart compares the sun to HIP 100963.

| Identifier | Distance (ly) | Stellar Class | Temperature (K) | Metallicity (dex) | Age (Gyr) |
|---|---|---|---|---|---|
| HD 195034 | 92 | G5 | 5,779 | −0.002 | 2.9 |
| Sun | 0.0000158 | G2V | 5,772 | +0.00 | 4.603 |
