= HD 192699 b =

Extrasolar planet in the constellation Aquila

HD 192699 b / Khomsa
Discovery
- Discovered by: Johnson et al.
- Discovery site: Lick Observatory and Keck Observatory
- Discovery date: 2007
- Detection method: Doppler spectroscopy

Orbital characteristics
- Semi-major axis: 1.063±0.049 AU
- Eccentricity: 0.082±0.041
- Orbital period (sidereal): 340.94±0.92 d
- Time of perihelion: 2454079±36 JD
- Argument of perihelion: 87±37 º
- Semi-amplitude: 49.3±2.1 m/s
- Star: HD 192699

Physical characteristics
- Mass: ≥2.096±0.093 M_{J}

HD 192699 b, also named Khomsa, is an exoplanet located approximately 214 light-years away in the constellation of Aquila, orbiting the star HD 192699. This planet was discovered in April 2007, massing at least 2.5 times the mass of Jupiter (M_{J}). Despite its orbital distance more than that of Earth, the orbital period is less than a year, because the parent star is more massive than the Sun.

The planet HD 192699 b is named Khomsa. The name was selected in the NameExoWorlds campaign by Tunisia, during the 100th anniversary of the IAU. Khomsa is a palm-shaped amulet that is popular in Tunisia.

The existence of this planet around a 1.68 solar mass (M_{☉}) star provides evidence for the existence of planetary systems around A-type main sequence stars.

== See also ==
- HD 175541 b
- HD 210702 b
