= HIP 56948 =

Star in the constellation Draco

Observation data Epoch J2000 Equinox ICRS
- Constellation: Draco
- Right ascension: 11^{h} 40^{m} 28.48394^{s}
- Declination: +69° 00′ 30.5978″
- Apparent magnitude (V): 8.67

Characteristics
- Evolutionary stage: main sequence
- Spectral type: G5V
- B−V color index: 0.647±0.014

Astrometry
Radial velocity (R_{v})	+5.4 km/s
Proper motion (μ)	RA: −126.843 mas/yr Dec.: −2.470 mas/yr
Parallax (π)	16.7935±0.0139 mas
Distance	194.2 ± 0.2 ly (59.55 ± 0.05 pc)
Absolute magnitude (M_{V})	+4.65

Details
Mass	0.98 M_{☉}
Radius	0.99 R_{☉}
Luminosity	1.01 L_{☉}
Surface gravity (log g)	4.409 cgs
Temperature	5,774 K
Metallicity [Fe/H]	0.02 dex
Rotational velocity (v sin i)	1.0 km/s
Age	~7.1 Gyr

Other designations
- HD 101364, BD+69 620, SAO 15590.

Database references
SIMBAD	data

HIP 56948 (also known as HD 101364) is a solar twin star of type G5V. It is one of the most Sun-like stars yet known in terms of size, mass, temperature, and chemical makeup. The Sun is about 4.6 billion years old, and HIP 56948 is thought to be about 7.1 billion years old. Both stars are between a third and halfway through their life on the main sequence.

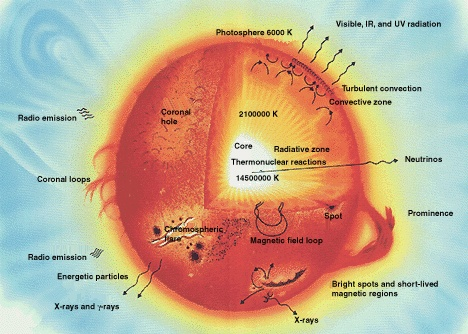
Cross-section of a solar-type star (NASA)

It is 208 light years away in the constellation of Draco, lying about halfway between Polaris and Dubhe on the celestial sphere. Astronomers have looked for planets in the system, so far without finding any. These observations suggest that the star does not have any hot Jupiters.

Jorge Meléndez of the Australian National University and Iván Ramírez of the University of Texas analysed the star in 2007 using the 2.7 metre Harlan J. Smith telescope at McDonald Observatory.

Most other solar analogs such as 18 Scorpii are unlike the Sun in that they have several times the lithium abundance. HIP 56948 is among the best candidates for a solar twin because of the known possible contenders, its lithium abundance most resembles that of the Sun. A 2009 high-dispersion spectroscopic study from the Astronomical Society of Japan confirms this.

In the abstract to their paper, the star's discoverers say:

For more than a decade, 18 Sco (HD 146233) has been considered the star that most closely resembles the Sun, even though significant differences such as its Li content, which is about 3 times solar, exist. Using high-resolution, high-S/N spectra obtained at McDonald Observatory, we show that the stars HIP 56948 and HIP 73815 are very similar to the Sun in both stellar parameters and chemical composition, including a low Li abundance, which was previously thought to be peculiar in the Sun. HIP 56948, in particular, has stellar parameters identical to solar within the observational uncertainties, being thus the best solar twin known to date. HIP 56948 is also similar to the Sun in its lack of hot Jupiters. Considering the age of this star (~1 ± 1 Gyr older than the Sun) (Note: The star's age estimate has been revised several times in different studies, most recently (as of February 2020) to 7.1 Gyr.) and its location and orbit around the Galaxy, if terrestrial planets exist around it, they may have had enough time to develop complex life, making it a prime target for SETI.

— Jorge Meléndez and Iván Ramírez, 8 October 2007

== See also ==
- Planetary habitability
- Rare Earth hypothesis
