= G-dwarf problem =

Star problem not similar to the Sun

Morgan-Keenan spectral classification of stars. Most common star type in the universe are M-dwarfs, 76%. The Sun is a 4.6 billion year-old G-class (G2V) star and is more massive than 95% of all stars. Only 7.6% are G-class stars

In astronomy, the G-dwarf problem refers to the apparent discrepancy in the distribution of metallicity levels in stars of different populations as compared to closed box models of galactic chemical evolution. According to closed box models, which represent galaxies without outside non-metallic material inflow, the distribution of metallicity levels in stars should follow a logarithmic curve. This amounts to high and low mass stars having the least metallicity, with G-type stars in between. However, these models are inconsistent with Milky Way observations. Other galaxies have been shown to have the same problem. The name comes from G-type stars, which are bright enough to be studied easily, yet are most often found unevolved. This provides an extensive look at relatively young stars. Despite this, the G-dwarf problem has also been observed in K and M dwarfs (the M dwarf problem).

== See also ==
- Solar analog
- List of nearest bright stars
- List of nearest stars and brown dwarfs
- Main sequence
  - G-type main-sequence star
