= HD 4391 =

Quadruple star system in the constellation of Phoenix

- Location of HD 4391 (circled in red)

Observation data Epoch J2000 Equinox ICRS
- Constellation: Phoenix
- Right ascension: 00^{h} 45^{m} 45.5929^{s}
- Declination: −47° 33′ 07.143″
- Apparent magnitude (V): 5.80

Characteristics

A
- Evolutionary stage: main sequence
- Spectral type: G3V
- B−V color index: +0.64

Astrometry

A
Radial velocity (R_{v})	−11.4 km/s
Proper motion (μ)	RA: +183.635 mas/yr Dec.: +79.015 mas/yr
Parallax (π)	66.4509±0.0446 mas
Distance	49.08 ± 0.03 ly (15.05 ± 0.01 pc)
Absolute magnitude (M_{V})	+4.90

Details

A
Mass	1.08 M_{☉}
Radius	0.92 R_{☉}
Luminosity	0.92 L_{☉}
Surface gravity (log g)	4.55 cgs
Temperature	5,916 K
Metallicity [Fe/H]	−0.06 dex
Rotation	12 days
Rotational velocity (v sin i)	3.5 km/s
Age	800 Myr

Other designations
- CD−48 176, HD 4391, GJ 1021, HIP 3583, HR 209, SAO 215232

Database references
SIMBAD	data

HD 4391 is a quadruple star system in the constellation Phoenix that is located at a distance of 49.1 light years from the Sun. The primary has a stellar classification of G3V, which is a G-type main sequence star. The physical properties of this star are similar to the Sun, making it a solar analog. However, it is believed to have 6% greater mass than the Sun and is only 800 million years old. The spectrum for this star displays an abnormally low level of beryllium, which may be the result of some form of mixing process.

No planet has been detected in orbit around this star, nor does it emit a statistically significant excess of infrared radiation that might indicate a debris disk. However, it has three companions that share a common proper motion through space with HD 4391, effectively making it a quadruple star system. HD 4391 B, a pair of red dwarfs of combined spectrum M4, lies at an angular separation of 17″ from the primary, with the two components designated Ba and Bb. HD 4391 C is a type M5 star at a separation of 49″. The close red dwarf pair are also sometimes designated HD 4391 B and HD 4391 C, with the outer component being named HD 4391 D.
