= Solar sibling =

Star formed in the same star cluster as the Sun

A solar sibling is a star that formed in the same star cluster as the Sun.

Stars that have been proposed as candidate solar siblings include HD 162826, HD 175740, and HD 186302. There is as yet no confirmed solar sibling and studies disagree on the most likely candidates; for example, a 2016 study suggested that previous candidates, including HD 162826 and HD 175740, are unlikely to be solar siblings.

A study using Gaia DR2 data published in 2020 found that HD 186302 is unlikely to be a solar sibling, while identifying a new candidate, "Solar Sibling 1", designated 2MASS J19354742+4803549. This star is also known as Kepler-1974 or KOI-7368, and was found in 2022 to be a member of a stellar association that is 40 million years old, much younger than the Sun, so it cannot be a solar sibling.

A 2019 study of the comet C/2018 V1 (Machholz–Fujikawa–Iwamoto) found that it may be an interstellar object, and identified two stars it may have originated from (Gaia DR2 1927143514955658880 and 1966383465746413568), which could be candidate solar siblings. This comet is not confirmed to have an interstellar origin and could be a more typical Oort cloud object.
