= HD 175541 =

Star in the constellation Serpens

HD 175541 / Kaveh
Observation data Epoch J2000 Equinox ICRS
- Constellation: Serpens
- Right ascension: 18^{h} 55^{m} 40.88415^{s}
- Declination: +04° 15′ 55.1651″
- Apparent magnitude (V): 8.02

Characteristics
- Evolutionary stage: red giant branch
- Spectral type: G6/8IV
- U−B color index: 0.56
- B−V color index: 0.869±0.024
- R−I color index: 0.33

Astrometry
Radial velocity (R_{v})	19.71±0.14 km/s
Proper motion (μ)	RA: −6.842 mas/yr Dec.: −90.413 mas/yr
Parallax (π)	7.6470±0.0255 mas
Distance	427 ± 1 ly (130.8 ± 0.4 pc)
Absolute magnitude (M_{V})	2.54

Details
Mass	1.45±0.03 M_{☉}
Radius	4.07±0.05 R_{☉}
Luminosity	10.0±0.1 L_{☉}
Surface gravity (log g)	3.37±0.02 cgs
Temperature	5,093±23 K
Metallicity [Fe/H]	−0.13±0.03 dex
Rotational velocity (v sin i)	0.47±0.23 km/s
Age	2.9±0.2 Gyr

Other designations
- Kaveh, BD+04°3911, GJ 736, HD 175541, HIP 92895, SAO 124054

Database references
SIMBAD	data
Exoplanet Archive	data
ARICNS	data

HD 175541 is an 8th magnitude star with an exoplanetary companion in the constellation Serpens. It has the proper name Kaveh, which was selected by Iran during the NameExoWorlds campaign as part of the 100th anniversary of the IAU. Kaveh is one of the heroes of the Shahnameh, the national epic of Greater Iran. The apparent visual magnitude of 8.02 is too faint for this star to be visible in the naked eye. It is located at a distance of approximately 427 light-years from the Sun based on parallax measurements, and is drifting further away with a radial velocity of +20 km/s. Despite its distance, it was given the number 736 in the Gliese Catalogue of Nearby Stars.

This is an evolved G-type star with a stellar classification of G6/8IV. The absolute magnitude of 2.54 places it 3.5 magnitudes above the comparable main sequence stars in the Sun's neighborhood, indicating that it is on the subgiant branch. When this intermediate-mass star was on the main-sequence, it was an A-type star. It is around three billion years old and is chromospherically inactive with low a projected rotational velocity of 0.5 km/s. The star has 1.45 times the mass and has expanded to 4.1 times the radius of the Sun. It is radiating ten times the luminosity of the Sun from its photosphere at an effective temperature of 5,093 K.

In April 2007, a Jovian planet was found orbiting this star using the radial velocity method, from Lick and Keck Observatories in Mount Hamilton (California) and Mauna Kea (Hawai'i), United States.

The HD 175541 planetary system
Companion (in order from star)	Mass	Semimajor axis (AU)	Orbital period (days)	Eccentricity	Inclination (°)	Radius
b / Kavian	≥ 0.598±0.029 M_{J}	0.975±0.087	298.43±0.45	0.110±0.049	—	—

== See also ==
- HD 192699
- HD 210702
- List of extrasolar planets
