= HD 175740 =

Star in the constellation Lyra

- Location of HD 175740 (circled in red)

Observation data Epoch J2000.0 Equinox ICRS
- Constellation: Lyra
- Right ascension: 18^{h} 54^{m} 52.17758^{s}
- Declination: +41° 36′ 09.7934″
- Apparent magnitude (V): 5.46

Characteristics
- Spectral type: K0III
- B−V color index: 1.034±0.004

Astrometry
| Radial velocity (R_{v}) | −9.52±0.13 km/s |
| Proper motion (μ) | RA: −2.059 mas/yr Dec.: −2.234 mas/yr |
| Parallax (π) | 12.2448±0.0874 mas |
| Distance | 266 ± 2 ly (81.7 ± 0.6 pc) |
| Absolute magnitude (M_{V}) | 0.89 |

Details
| Mass | 1.39 or 2.795 M_{☉} |
| Radius | 10.17+0.35 −0.73 R_{☉} |
| Luminosity | 49.90±0.45 L_{☉} |
| Surface gravity (log g) | 2.8 cgs |
| Temperature | 4,811+181 −81 K |
| Metallicity [Fe/H] | −0.01±0.06 dex |
| Rotational velocity (v sin i) | 4.0 km/s |
| Age | 4.78 Gyr |

Other designations
- BD+41°3177, GC 25972, HD 175740, HIP 92831, HR 7146, SAO 47909, WDS J18549+4136A

Database references
| SIMBAD | data |

HD 175740 is a single star in the northern constellation of Lyra. This object has an orange hue and is dimly visible to the naked eye with an apparent visual magnitude of 5.46. It is located at a distance of approximately 266 light years from the Sun based on parallax, and has an absolute magnitude of 0.89. The star is drifting closer with a radial velocity of −9.5 km/s, and is predicted to come as close as 31.7 light-years in around 8 million years.

This is an aging giant star with a stellar classification of K0III, having evolved off the main sequence after the supply of hydrogen at its core was exhausted. It is an estimated 4.78 billion years old with 1.39 times the mass of the Sun, although Bailer-Jones et al. (2018) give a higher estimate of 2.8 times the Sun's mass. The elemental composition of this star has made it the first giant to be a candidate solar sibling, suggesting it may have been born in the same star cluster as the Sun. It has expanded to ten times the girth of the Sun and is radiating 50 times the Sun's luminosity from its photosphere at an effective temperature of 4,811 K.

HD 175740 has a magnitude 12.6 visual companion, located at an angular separation of 8.4″ along a position angle (PA) of 300°, as of 2013. A magnitude 11.5 companion lies at a separation of 24.1″ along a PA of 39°, as of 2014. Both were discovered by American astronomer G. W. Hough in 1887.
