= HD 147513 b =

Exoplanet in the constellation Scorpius

Discovery
- Discovered by: Mayor et al.
- Discovery site: France
- Discovery date: June 19, 2002
- Detection method: Radial velocity

Orbital characteristics
- Apastron: 1.66 AU (248,000,000 km)
- Periastron: 0.98 AU (147,000,000 km)
- Semi-major axis: 1.32 AU (197,000,000 km)
- Eccentricity: 0.26 ± 0.05
- Orbital period (sidereal): 528.4 ± 6.3 d 1.4467 y
- Time of periastron: 2,451,123 ± 20
- Argument of periastron: 282 ± 9
- Semi-amplitude: 29.3 ± 1.8
- Star: HD 147513

HD 147513 b is an exoplanet approximately 42 light-years away in the constellation of Scorpius. It is at least 21% more massive than Jupiter. But unlike Jupiter, it orbits the star much closer, mean distance being only a third more than Earth's distance from the Sun. Its orbit is also eccentric; at periastron, it is closer to its star than Earth is from the Sun, whereas at apastron, it is further from its star than Mars to the Sun, finding itself on the outer edge of the habitable zone.
