= HD 210702 =

Star in the constellation Pegasus

- Location of HD 210702 (circled in red)

Observation data Epoch J2000 Equinox ICRS
- Constellation: Pegasus
- Right ascension: 22^{h} 11^{m} 51.331^{s}
- Declination: +16° 02′ 26.00″
- Apparent magnitude (V): 5.93

Characteristics
- Evolutionary stage: subgiant
- Spectral type: K1 III
- B−V color index: 0.951±0.001

Astrometry
Radial velocity (R_{v})	18.4593±0.0392 km/s
Proper motion (μ)	RA: −3.263±0.156 mas/yr Dec.: −17.296±0.036 mas/yr
Parallax (π)	18.4593±0.0392 mas
Distance	176.7 ± 0.4 ly (54.2 ± 0.1 pc)
Absolute magnitude (M_{V})	2.14

Details
Mass	1.47±0.04 M_{☉}
Radius	4.9±0.1 R_{☉}
Luminosity	12.9±0.1 L_{☉}
Surface gravity (log g)	3.2200±0.074 cgs
Temperature	4,946±32 K
Metallicity [Fe/H]	0.083±0.027 dex
Rotational velocity (v sin i)	2.50±0.48 km/s
Age	3.1±0.3 Gyr

Other designations
- BD+15°4592, HD 210702, HIP 109577, HR 8461, SAO 107729

Database references
SIMBAD	data
Exoplanet Archive	data

HD 210702 is a star with an orbiting exoplanet in the northern constellation of Pegasus. It has an apparent visual magnitude of 5.93, which is bright enough that the star is dimly visible to the naked eye. The distance to HD 210702 is 177 light years based on parallax measurements, and it is drifting further away with a radial velocity of 18.5 km/s. It is a probable member of the Ursa Major moving group, an association of co-moving stars.

Although a stellar classification of K1 III suggests this is an evolved giant star, it is more likely to be a subgiant star currently at the base of the red giant branch. Currently 3 billion years old, HD 210702 spent its main-sequence life as an A-type star. Consistent with its evolutionary status, it has little or no magnetic activity in its chromosphere. The star has 1.5 times the mass of the Sun and has expanded to 4.9 times the Sun's radius. It is radiating 12.9 times the luminosity of the Sun from its enlarged photosphere at an effective temperature of 4,946 K.

== Planetary system ==
The star shows variability in its radial velocity consistent with an exoplanetary companion in a Keplerian orbit, and one was duly discovered in April 2007, from observations at Lick and Keck Observatories in Mount Hamilton (California) and Mauna Kea (Hawai'i), United States. As the inclination of the orbital plane is unknown, only a lower bound on the mass of this object can be estimated. It has at least 1.8 times the mass of Jupiter.

The HD 210702 planetary system
Companion (in order from star)	Mass	Semimajor axis (AU)	Orbital period (days)	Eccentricity	Inclination (°)	Radius
b	≥1.808±0.097 M_{J}	1.148±0.057	354.10±0.70	0.028±0.034	—	—

== See also ==
- HD 175541
- HD 192699
- List of extrasolar planets
