= HD 210702 b =

Extrasolar planet in the constellation Pegasus

Discovery
- Discovered by: Johnson et al.
- Discovery site: Lick Observatory and Keck Observatory
- Discovery date: 2007
- Detection method: Doppler spectroscopy

Orbital characteristics
- Semi-major axis: 1.148±0.057 AU
- Eccentricity: 0.028±0.034
- Orbital period (sidereal): 354.10±0.70 d
- Time of perihelion: 2454042±64 JD
- Argument of perihelion: 189±66 º
- Semi-amplitude: 37.8±2.0 m/s
- Star: HD 210702

Physical characteristics
- Mass: ≥1.808±0.097 M_{J}

HD 210702 b is an exoplanet located approximately 177 light-years away in the constellation of Pegasus, orbiting the star HD 210702. This planet, together with HD 175541 b and HD 192699 b, are planets around intermediate mass stars that were announced in April 2007 by Johnson et al. It has at least twice the mass of Jupiter and it orbits with semimajor axis of 1.17 AU, corresponding to a period of 341.1 days.

Planets around intermediate mass subgiants provide clues for the history of formation and migration of planets around A-type stars.

== See also ==
- HD 175541 b
- HD 192699 b
