= 72 Herculis =

G-type main sequence star in the constellation Hercules

- Location of 72 Herculis (circled in red)

Observation data Epoch J2000 Equinox ICRS
- Constellation: Hercules
- Right ascension: 17^{h} 20^{m} 39.56745^{s}
- Declination: +32° 28′ 03.8780″
- Apparent magnitude (V): 5.377±0.005

Characteristics
- Evolutionary stage: subgiant
- Spectral type: G0 V
- U−B color index: +0.06
- B−V color index: +0.62
- Variable type: Suspected

Astrometry
| Radial velocity (R_{v}) | −78.608±0.0065 km/s |
| Proper motion (μ) | RA: +135.810 mas/yr Dec.: −1,040.953 mas/yr |
| Parallax (π) | 68.5575±0.0553 mas |
| Distance | 47.57 ± 0.04 ly (14.59 ± 0.01 pc) |
| Absolute magnitude (M_{V}) | 4.43±0.05 |

Details
| Mass | 0.93 M_{☉} |
| Radius | 1.17 R_{☉} |
| Luminosity | 1.30 L_{☉} |
| Surface gravity (log g) | 4.33 cgs |
| Temperature | 5,704 K |
| Metallicity [Fe/H] | −0.31±0.11 dex |
| Rotation | 21 days |
| Rotational velocity (v sin i) | 1.0±1.0 km/s |
| Age | 13 Gyr |

Other designations
- w Her, 72 Her, NSV 8553, BD+32°2896, FK5 1456, GJ 672, HD 157214, HIP 84862, HR 6458, SAO 65963, LHS 441, LTT 15148

Database references
| SIMBAD | data |

72 Herculis is a single star in the northern constellation of Hercules. The Flamsteed designation for this star comes from the publication Historia Coelestis Britannica by John Flamsteed. It is the 72nd star in Flamsteed's list of stars in Hercules. This star is faintly visible to the naked eye with an apparent visual magnitude of 5.4. Parallax measurements show this star to be located at a distance of about 48 light years from the Sun. It is drifting closer with a radial velocity of −78.6 km/s, and is predicted to come to within 32.1 light-years in around 98,000 years.

This is an ordinary G-type main-sequence star with a stellar classification of G0 V. It is similar in mass to the Sun, with a 17% larger radius. The star is radiating 1.3 times the luminosity of the Sun from its photosphere at an effective temperature of 5,704 K. The metallicity is much lower than in the Sun, with an [Fe/H] equal to −0.31±0.11. The star is an estimated 13 billion years old with a projected rotational velocity of 1 km/s. The level of chromospheric activity appears to be at or below that in the Sun.

As of 2010, no planetary companion had been detected orbiting this star. The Washington Visual Double Star Catalog for 1996 showed two visual companions of this star. The first is a visual magnitude 9.7 star located 289.1 arc seconds away. The second is only separated by 8.7 arc seconds, and is magnitude 12.9. It is unknown whether these visual companions are gravitationally-bound to 72 Her.
