= Solar analog =

Star that is particularly similar to the Sun

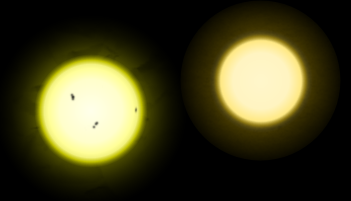
This illustration compares the somewhat larger and hotter Sun (left) to the relatively inactive star Tau Ceti.

Solar-type stars, solar analogs (also analogues), and solar twins are stars that are particularly similar to the Sun. The stellar classification is a hierarchy with solar twin being most like the Sun followed by solar analog and then solar-type. Observations of these stars are important for understanding better the properties of the Sun in relation to other stars and the habitability of planets.

== By similarity to the Sun ==
Defining the three categories by their similarity to the Sun reflects the evolution of astronomical observational techniques. Originally, solar-type was the closest that similarity to the Sun could be defined. Later, more precise measurement techniques and improved observatories allowed for greater precision of key details like temperature, enabling the creation of a solar analog category for stars that were particularly similar to the Sun. Later still, continued improvements in precision allowed for the creation of a solar-twin category for near-perfect matches.

Similarity to the Sun allows for checking derived quantities—such as temperature, which is derived from the color index—against the Sun, the only star whose temperature is confidently known. For stars that are not similar to the Sun, this cross-checking cannot be done.

=== Solar-type ===
These stars are broadly similar to the Sun. They are main-sequence stars with a B−V color between 0.48 and 0.80, the Sun having a B−V color of 0.65. Alternatively, a definition based on spectral type can be used, such as F8V through K2V, which would correspond to B−V color of 0.50 to 1.00. This definition fits approximately 10% of stars, so a list of solar-type stars would be quite extensive.

Solar-type stars show highly correlated behavior between their rotation rates and their chromospheric activity (e.g. Calcium H & K line emission) and coronal activity (e.g. X-ray emission) Because solar-type stars spin down during their main-sequence lifetimes due to magnetic braking, these correlations allow rough ages to be derived. Mamajek & Hillenbrand (2008) have estimated the ages for the 108 solar-type (F8V–K2V) main-sequence stars within 52 light-years (16 parsecs) of the Sun based on their chromospheric activity (as measured via Ca, H, and K emission lines).

The following table shows a sample of solar-type stars within 50 light years that nearly satisfy the criteria for solar analogs (B−V color between 0.48 and 0.80), based on current measurements (the Sun is listed for comparison):

Sample of solar-type stars
Identifier	J2000 coordinates		Distance (ly)	Stellar class	Temperature (K)	Metallicity (dex)	Age (Gyr)	Notes
Identifier	Right ascension	Declination	Distance (ly)	Stellar class	Temperature (K)	Metallicity (dex)	Age (Gyr)	Notes
Sun	—	—	0.0000158	G2V	5778	+0.00	4.6	
Rigil Kentaurus	15^{h} 49^{m} 36.49400^{s}	−60° 50′ 02.3737″	4.37	G2V	5790	+0.20	4.4	
Toliman	15^{h} 49^{m} 36.49400^{s}	−60° 50′ 02.3737″	4.37	K1V	5242		5.3	
Epsilon Eridani	-09^{h} 27^{m} 29.7^{s}	03° 32′ 55.8″	10.4	K2V	5084	-0.13	0.4-0.8	
Tau Ceti	01^{h} 44^{m} 04.1^{s}	−15° 56′ 15″	11.9	G8V	5344	–0.52	5.8	
HD 20794	03^{h} 19^{m} 55.7^{s}	−43° 04′ 11.2″	19.8	G8V	5338	–0.54	6.1	
Delta Pavonis	20^{h} 08^{m} 43.6^{s}	−66° 10′ 55″	19.9	G8IV	5604	+0.33	~7	
V538 Aurigae	05^{h} 41^{m} 20.3^{s}	+53° 28′ 51.8″	39.9	K1V	5257	−0.20	3.7	
HD 14412	02^{h} 18^{m} 58.5^{s}	−25° 56′ 45″	41.3	G5V	5432	−0.46	9.6	
HR 4587	12^{h} 00^{m} 44.3^{s}	−10° 26′ 45.7″	42.1	G8IV	5538	+0.18	8.5	
HD 172051	18^{h} 38^{m} 53.4^{s}	−21° 03′ 07″	42.7	G5V	5610	−0.32	4.3	
72 Herculis	17^{h} 20^{m} 39.6^{s}	+32° 28′ 04″	46.9	G0V	5662	−0.37	5	
HD 196761	20^{h} 40^{m} 11.8^{s}	−23° 46′ 26″	46.9	G8V	5415	−0.31	6.6	
Nu² Lupi	15^{h} 21^{m} 48.1^{s}	−48° 19′ 03″	47.5	G4V	5664	−0.34	10.3	

=== Solar analog ===
These stars are photometrically similar to the Sun, having the following qualities:

- Temperature within 500 K from that of the Sun (5278 to 6278 K)
- Metallicity of 50–200% (± 0.3 dex) of that of the Sun, meaning the star's protoplanetary disk would have had similar amounts of dust from which planets could form
- No close companion (orbital period of ten days or less), because such a companion stimulates stellar activity

Solar analogs not meeting the stricter solar twin criteria include, within 50 light years and in order of increasing distance (The Sun is listed for comparison.):

Identifier	J2000 coordinates		Distance (ly)	Stellar class	Temperature (K)	Metallicity (dex)	Age (Gyr)	Notes
Identifier	Right ascension	Declination	Distance (ly)	Stellar class	Temperature (K)	Metallicity (dex)	Age (Gyr)	Notes
Sun	—	—	0.0000158	G2V	5,778	+0.00	4.6	
Sigma Draconis	19^{h} 32^{m} 21.6^{s}	+69° 39′ 40″	18.8	G9–K0 V	5,297	−0.20	4.7	
Beta Canum Venaticorum	12^{h} 33^{m} 44.5^{s}	+41° 21′ 27″	27.4	G0V	5,930	−0.30	6.0	
61 Virginis	13^{h} 18^{m} 24.3^{s}	−18° 18′ 40″	27.8	G5V	5,558	−0.02	6.3	
Zeta Tucanae	00^{h} 20^{m} 04.3^{s}	–64° 52′ 29″	28.0	F9.5V	5,956	−0.14	2.5	
Beta Comae Berenices	13^{h} 11^{m} 52.4^{s}	+27° 52′ 41″	29.8	G0V	5,970	−0.06	2.0	
61 Ursae Majoris	11^{h} 41^{m} 03.0^{s}	+34° 12′ 06″	31.1	G8V	5,483	−0.12	1.0	
HR 511	01^{h} 47^{m} 44.8^{s}	+63° 51′ 09″	32.8	K0V	5,333	+0.05	3.0	
Alpha Mensae	06^{h} 10^{m} 14.5^{s}	–74° 45′ 11″	33.1	G5V	5,594	+0.10	5.4	
HD 69830	08^{h} 18^{m} 23.9^{s}	−12° 37′ 56″	40.6	K0V	5,410	−0.03	10.6	
HD 10307	01^{h} 41^{m} 47.1^{s}	+42° 36′ 48″	41.2	G1.5V	5,848	−0.05	7.0	
HD 147513	16^{h} 24^{m} 01.3^{s}	−39° 11′ 35″	42.0	G1V	5,858	+0.03	0.4	
58 Eridani	04^{h} 47^{m} 36.3^{s}	−16° 56′ 04″	43.3	G3V	5,868	+0.02	0.6	
47 Ursae Majoris	10^{h} 59^{m} 28.0^{s}	+40° 25′ 49″	45.9	G1V	5,954	+0.06	6.0	
Psi Serpentis	15^{h} 44^{m} 01.8^{s}	+02° 30′ 54.6″	47.8	G5V	5,683	0.04	3.2	
HD 84117	09^{h} 42^{m} 14.4^{s}	–23° 54′ 56″	48.5	F8V	6,167	−0.03	3.1	
HD 4391	00^{h} 45^{m} 45.6^{s}	–47° 33′ 07″	48.6	G3V	5,878	−0.03	1.2	
20 Leonis Minoris	10^{h} 01^{m} 00.7^{s}	+31° 55′ 25″	49.1	G3V	5,741	+0.20	6.5	
Nu Phoenicis	01^{h} 15^{m} 11.1^{s}	–45° 31′ 54″	49.3	F8V	6,140	+0.18	5.7	
Helvetios	22^{h} 57^{m} 28.0^{s}	+20° 46′ 08″	50.9	G2.5IVa	5,804	+0.20	7.0	

=== Solar twin ===
To date no solar twin that exactly matches the Sun has been found. However, there are some stars that come very close to being identical to the Sun, and thus are considered solar twins by members of the astronomical community. An exact solar twin would be a G2V star with a 5,778K surface temperature, be 4.6 billion years old, with the correct metallicity, and a 0.1% solar luminosity variation. Stars with an age of 4.6 billion years are at their most stable state. Proper metallicity, radius, chemical composition, rotation, magnetic activity, and size are also very important to low luminosity variation.

Morgan-Keenan spectral classification of stars. Most common star type in the universe are M-dwarfs, 76%. The Sun is a 4.6 billion year-old G-class (G2V) star and is more massive than 95% of all stars. Only 7.6% are G-class stars.

The stars below are more similar to the Sun and having the following qualities:

- Temperature within 50 K from that of the Sun (5728 to 5828 K) (Note: A true solar twins as noted by the Lowell Observatory should have a temperature within ~10 K of the Sun. Space Telescope Science Institute, Lowell Observatory, noted in 1996 that temperature precision of ~10 K can be measured. A temperature of ~10 K reduces the solar twin list to near zero, so ±50 K is used for the chart.) (within 10 K of sun (5768–5788 K))
- Metallicity of 89–112% (± 0.05 dex) of that of the Sun, meaning the star's proplyd would have had almost exactly the same amount of dust for planetary formation
- No stellar companion
- An age within 1 billion years from that of the Sun (3.6 to 5.6 Ga)

Other parameters of the Sun:

- Axial rotation approximately once every 27 days or 1.997 kilometres per second (1.241 mi/s)
- Radius of 700,000 kilometres (430,000 mi)
- Chemical composition by mass: hydrogen (73.4%); helium (25%); carbon (0.2%); nitrogen (0.09%); oxygen (0.80%); neon (0.16%); magnesium (0.06%); silicon (0.09&); sulfur (0.05%); iron (0.003%).

The following are the known stars that come closest to satisfying the criteria for a solar twin. The Sun is listed for comparison. Highlighted boxes are out of range for a solar twin. The star may have been noted as solar twin in the past, but are more of a solar analog.

Identifier	J2000 coordinates		Distance (ly)	Stellar class	Temperature (K)	Metallicity (dex)	Age (Gyr)	Notes
Identifier	Right ascension	Declination	Distance (ly)	Stellar class	Temperature (K)	Metallicity (dex)	Age (Gyr)	Notes
Sun	—	—	0.0000158	G2V	5,778	+0.00	4.6	
18 Scorpii	16^{h} 15^{m} 37.3^{s}	–08° 22′ 06″	45.1	G2Va	5,433	−0.03	2.9	
HD 150248	16^{h} 41^{m} 49.8^{s}	–45° 22′ 07″	90.7	G3V + ?	5,750	−0.04	8.10	
HD 195034	20^{h} 28^{m} 11.8^{s}	+22° 07′ 44″	92	G5	5,760	−0.04	2.9	
HD 117939	13^{h} 34^{m} 32.6^{s}	–38° 54′ 26″	98	G3	5,730	−0.10	6.1	
HD 138573	15^{h} 32^{m} 43.7^{s}	+10° 58′ 06″	99	G5IV–V	5,757	+0.00	7.1	
HD 98649	11^{h} 20^{m} 51.769^{s}	–23° 13′ 02″	135	G4V	5,759	−0.02	2.3	
HD 143436	16^{h} 00^{m} 18.8^{s}	+00° 08′ 13″	141	G0	5,768	+0.00	3.8 (±2.9)	
HD 129357	14^{h} 41^{m} 22.4^{s}	+29° 03′ 32″	154	G2V	5,749	−0.02	8.2	
HD 133600	15^{h} 05^{m} 13.2^{s}	+06° 17′ 24″	171	G0	5,808	+0.02	6.3	
HD 186302	19^{h} 49^{m} 6.43^{s}	−70° 11′ 16.7″	184	G3	5,675	+0.00	4.5	
HIP 11915	02^{h} 33^{m} 49.02^{s}	−19° 36′ 42.5″	190	G5V	5,760	–0.059	4.1	
HD 101364	11^{h} 40^{m} 28.5^{s}	+69° 00′ 31″	208	G5V	5,795	+0.02	7.1	
HD 197027	20^{h} 41^{m} 54.6^{s}	–27° 12′ 57″	250	G3V	5,723	−0.013	8.2	
Kepler-452	19^{h} 44^{m} 00.89^{s}	+44° 16′ 39.2″	1400	G2V	5,757	+0.21	6.0	
YBP 1194	08^{h} 51^{m} 00.8^{s}	+11° 48′ 53″	2934	G5V	5,780	+0.023	~ 4.2 (± 1.6)	

Some other stars are sometimes mentioned as solar-twin candidates such as: Beta Canum Venaticorum; however it has too low metallicity (−0.21) to be a solar twin. 16 Cygni B is sometimes noted as twin, but is part of a triple star system and is too old to be a solar twin at 6.8 Ga.

== By potential habitability ==
Another way of defining solar twin is as a "habstar"—a star with qualities believed to be particularly hospitable to a life-hosting planet. Qualities considered include variability, mass, age, metallicity, and close companions. (Note: habstar or habitability, is currently defined as an area, such as a planet or a moon, where liquid water can exist for at least a short duration of time.)

- At least 0.5–1 billion years old
- On the main sequence
- Non-variable
- Capable of harboring terrestrial planets
- Support a dynamically stable habitable zone
- 0–1 non-wide stellar companion stars.

The requirement that the star remain on the main sequence for at least 0.5–1 Ga sets an upper limit of approximately 2.2–3.4 solar masses, corresponding to a hottest spectral type of A0-B7V. Such stars can be 100x as bright as the Sun. Tardigrade-like life (due to the UV flux) could potentially survive on planets orbiting stars as hot as B1V, with a mass of 10 M☉, and a temperature of 25,000 K, a main-sequence lifetime of about 20 million years. (Note: The supergiant and following supernova & neutron star (due to >8 M_{☉} mass) would likely destroy the life at the end of the B1V star's lifetime.)

Non-variability is ideally defined as variability of less than 1%, but 3% is the practical limit due to limits in available data. Variation in irradiance in a star's habitable zone due to a companion star with an eccentric orbit is also a concern.

Terrestrial planets in multiple star systems, those containing three or more stars, are not likely to have stable orbits in the long term. Stable orbits in binary systems take one of two forms: S-Type (satellite or circumstellar) orbits around one of the stars, and P-Type (planetary or circumbinary) orbits around the entire binary pair. Eccentric Jupiters may also disrupt the orbits of planets in habitable zones.

Metallicity of at least 40% solar ([Fe/H] = −0.4) is required for the formation of an Earth-like terrestrial planet. High metallicity strongly correlates to the formation of hot Jupiters, but these are not absolute bars to life, as some gas giants end up orbiting within the habitable zone themselves, and could potentially host Earth-like moons.

One example of such a star is HD 70642, a G5V, at temperature of 5533 K, but is much younger than the Sun, at 1.9 billion years old.

Another such example would be HIP 11915, which has a planetary system containing a Jupiter-like planet orbiting at a similar distance that the planet Jupiter does in the Solar System. To strengthen the similarities, the star is class G5V, has a temperature of 5750 K, has a Sun-like mass and radius, and is only 500 million years younger than the Sun. As such, the habitable zone would extend in the same area as the zone in the Solar System, around 1 AU. This would allow an Earth-like planet to exist around 1 AU.

== See also ==
- Planetary habitability
- G-dwarf problem
- List of nearest bright stars
- List of nearest stars
- Main sequence
  - G-type main-sequence star
    - Habitability of G-type main-sequence star systems
- Space colonization
