= HD 175541 b =

Jovian exoplanet in the constellation Serpens

HD 175541 b / Kavian
Discovery
- Discovered by: Johnson et al.
- Discovery site: Lick Observatory and Keck Observatory
- Discovery date: April 10, 2007
- Detection method: Doppler spectroscopy

Orbital characteristics
- Semi-major axis: 0.975±0.087 AU
- Eccentricity: 0.110±0.049
- Orbital period (sidereal): 298.43±0.45 d
- Time of perihelion: 2450155±25 JD
- Argument of perihelion: 129±28 º
- Semi-amplitude: 14.68±0.71 m/s
- Star: HD 175541

Physical characteristics
- Mass: ≥0.598±0.029 M_{J}

HD 175541 b, also named Kavian, is a jovian planet located approximately 424 light-years away in the constellation of Serpens, orbiting the star HD 175541. This planet was discovered in April 2007. Despite the distance of the planet to its star being slightly greater than Earth to the Sun, the period is less than 300 days due to the parent star's larger mass, and the orbit is somewhat eccentric.

The planet HD 175541 b is called Kavian. The name was selected in the NameExoWorlds campaign by Iran, during the 100th anniversary of the IAU. Kaveh (name of the star HD 175541) carries a banner called Derafsh Kaviani in the Shahnameh.

The discovery of this planet and two others: HD 192699 b and HD 210702 b around intermediate-mass stars provide clues about the formation and history of migration of planets around the A-type stars.
