= HD 133600 =

Star in the constellation Virgo

Observation data Epoch J2000.0 Equinox ICRS
- Constellation: Virgo
- Right ascension: 15^{h} 05^{m} 13.2482^{s}
- Declination: +06° 17′ 23.692″
- Apparent magnitude (V): 8.219

Characteristics
- Spectral type: G0
- B−V color index: 0.6
- V−R color index: 0.4
- R−I color index: 0.2

Astrometry
| Proper motion (μ) | RA: −3.728±0.085 mas/yr Dec.: −246.535±0.089 mas/yr |
| Parallax (π) | 18.3157±0.0506 mas |
| Distance | 178.1 ± 0.5 ly (54.6 ± 0.2 pc) |
| Absolute magnitude (M_{V}) | 4.39 |

Details
| Mass | 1.00±0.03 M_{☉} |
| Luminosity (bolometric) | 1.21±0.14 L_{☉} |
| Surface gravity (log g) | 4.37±0.02 cgs |
| Temperature | 5,788±6 K |
| Metallicity [Fe/H] | +0.004±0.005 dex |
| Rotational velocity (v sin i) | 1.42±0.13 km/s |
| Age | 6.57±0.46 Gyr |

Other designations
- BD+06 2987, GC 20290, HIP 73815, LTT 14484, NLTT 39253, PPM 161240, SAO 120828.

Database references
| SIMBAD | data |

HD 133600, also known as HIP 73815, is a G-type star in the constellation of Virgo. It has an apparent visual magnitude of approximately 8.219^{m}. It is similar to the Sun and has been called a near solar twin, as it is 1.5 billion years older than the Sun.

Its distance is 54.6 parsecs (178 light years) from the Sun. Mass is within 3 percent of the Sun.

Near solar twins can help us to understand solar activity such as solar flares and sunspot cycles over longer time periods than the historical records, and to put unique historical events such as the Maunder minimum in context. They can also be used to set the zero point of fundamental calibrations in astrophysics, and models of solar evolution.

Near solar twins can also help answer whether the Sun is unique or not. It used to be thought that the Sun might be unique for its low lithium abundance. This star was one of two stars that were used in 2007 papers by Melendez & Ramırez to show that the Sun was not unique in this respect as it has lithium abundance similar to the Sun, but is not an ideal comparison as HD 133600 is 1.5 billion years older than the Sun. Yet, this has made it a useful star for studies into the problem of the depleted lithium abundance at the solar surface compared with other stars, something that is not yet fully understood, and known as the Lithium depletion problem.
