= HD 186302 =

Star in the constellation Pavo

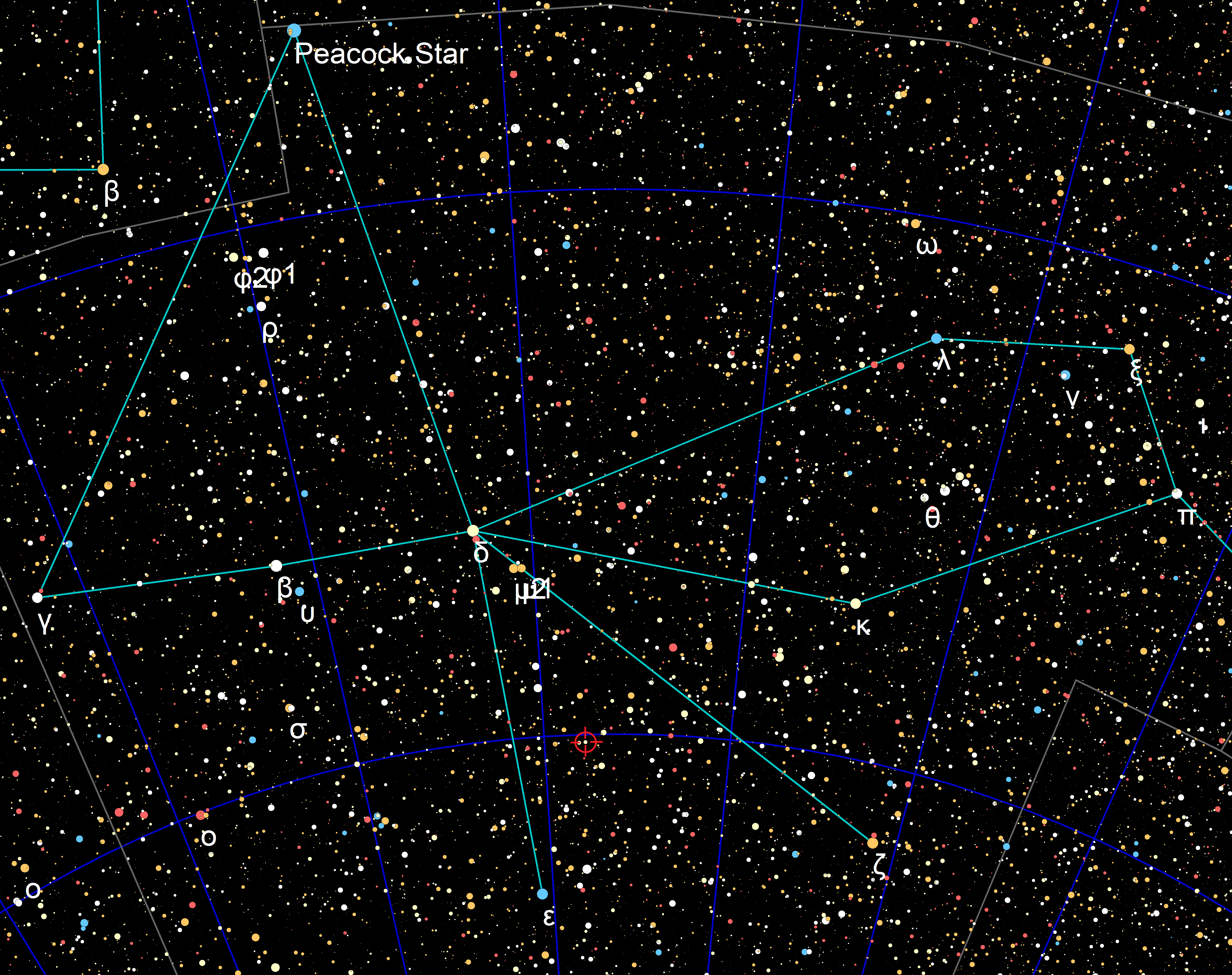
- Location of HD 186302 (circled)

Observation data Epoch J2000 Equinox J2000
- Constellation: Pavo
- Right ascension: 19^{h} 49^{m} 06.43036^{s}
- Declination: −70° 11′ 16.7033″
- Apparent magnitude (V): 8.76±0.01

Characteristics
- Evolutionary stage: main sequence
- Spectral type: G3/5 V
- B−V color index: 0.67

Astrometry
| Radial velocity (R_{v}) | −1.3±0.3 km/s |
| Proper motion (μ) | RA: −24.004 mas/yr Dec.: −38.804 mas/yr |
| Parallax (π) | 17.6309±0.0147 mas |
| Distance | 185.0 ± 0.2 ly (56.72 ± 0.05 pc) |
| Absolute magnitude (M_{V}) | +5.11 |

Details
| Mass | 0.97±0.01 M_{☉} |
| Radius | 0.95±0.01 R_{☉} |
| Surface gravity (log g) | 4.47±0.01 cgs |
| Temperature | 5,675±15 K |
| Metallicity [Fe/H] | −0.03 dex |
| Rotational velocity (v sin i) | 2.30 km/s |
| Age | 4.5±0.81 Gyr |

Other designations
- HD 186302, HIP 97507, 2MASS J19490644-7011167, CD−70°1724

Database references
| SIMBAD | data |

HD 186302 (also designated HIP 97507) is a star in the constellation of Pavo. It is 185 light-years (57 parsecs) away from Earth, with an apparent magnitude of 8.76. It was identified in November 2018 as a potential solar sibling to the Sun, like HD 162826. Similar in spectrum and size, it was suspected to have formed in the same stellar nursery as the Sun 4.6 billion years ago. However, a common origin with the Sun was found to be unlikely in a 2019 paper, as HD 186302's galactic orbit is very different from the Sun's.

== See also ==
- HD 162826; the first star identified as a solar sibling in February 2014, in Hercules.
