= HD 147513 =

Star in the constellation Scorpius

- Location of HD 147513 (circled in red)

Observation data Epoch J2000.0 Equinox ICRS
- Constellation: Scorpius
- Right ascension: 16^{h} 24^{m} 01.28927^{s}
- Declination: −39° 11′ 34.7121″
- Apparent magnitude (V): 5.38

Characteristics
- Evolutionary stage: main sequence
- Spectral type: G1V CH-04
- U−B color index: +0.00
- B−V color index: +0.62
- Variable type: suspected

Astrometry
Radial velocity (R_{v})	+12.6 km/s
Proper motion (μ)	RA: 71.89 mas/yr Dec.: 5.26 mas/yr
Parallax (π)	78.26±0.37 mas
Distance	41.7 ± 0.2 ly (12.78 ± 0.06 pc)
Absolute magnitude (M_{V})	4.82

Details
Mass	1.05+0.04 −0.05 M_{☉}
Radius	0.99±0.02 R_{☉}
Luminosity	1.00±0.05 L_{☉}
Surface gravity (log g)	4.50 cgs
Temperature	5,816+50 −45 K
Metallicity [Fe/H]	0.03 dex
Rotation	4.7 days
Rotational velocity (v sin i)	0.32 km/s
Age	400 Myr

Other designations
- 62 G. Sco, CD−38°10983, CPD−38°6407, FK5 3295, GC 22030, GJ 620.1, GJ 9559, HD 147513, HIP 80337, HR 6094, SAO 207622

Database references
SIMBAD	data
Exoplanet Archive	data
ARICNS	data

HD 147513 (62 G. Scorpii) is a star in the southern constellation of Scorpius. It was first catalogued by Italian astronomer Giuseppe Piazzi in his star catalogue as "XVI 55". With an apparent magnitude of 5.38, according to the Bortle scale it is visible to the naked eye from suburban skies. Based upon stellar parallax measurements by the Hipparcos spacecraft, HD 147513 lies some 42 light years from the Sun.

== Properties ==
This is a Sun-like main sequence star with a stellar classification of G1V CH-04. It has about 5% greater mass than the Sun, and is considered young with an estimated age of 400 million years. As such, it has a similar luminosity to the Sun despite being more massive. Although the abundance of elements is similar to the Sun, it is a Barium star that is overabundant in elements produced through the s-process. HD 147513 is suspected of being a variable star.

HD 147513 is a member of the Ursa Major moving group that share a common proper motion through space. It has a nearby co-moving companion: a DA-class white dwarf located some 5,360 AU distant, where an AU is the average separation of the Earth from the Sun. At one time the pair may have been members of a multiple star system. The progenitor of the white dwarf may have been a closer companion, and while passing through the asymptotic giant branch stage of its evolution, could have transferred matter onto HD 147513 and contaminated this star's photosphere.

== Supposed planetary system ==
In 2002, the Geneva Extrasolar Planet Search Team announced the discovery of an extrasolar planet orbiting the star. Based upon the orbital elements, most of this gas giant's orbit lies within the habitable zone (HZ) of the host star; it only passes outside this region at apogee. As such, it is unlikely that a terrestrial planet could have a stable orbit within the HZ unless it moves in a synchronized fashion with the gas giant. Numerical simulations suggest that such a planet could orbit within the L_{4} or L_{5} Lagrangian points of the gas giant.

The planet, however, has not been independently confirmed by other studies, and in 2025 a paper reported a non-detection, suggesting that the original observations were likely in error.

The HD 147513 planetary system
Companion (in order from star)	Mass	Semimajor axis (AU)	Orbital period (days)	Eccentricity	Inclination (°)	Radius
b (dubious)	>1.21 M_{J}	1.32	528.4 ± 6.3	0.26 ± 0.05	—	—
