= 18 Scorpii =

Star in the constellation Scorpius

- Location of 18 Scorpii (circled)

Observation data Epoch J2000.0 Equinox ICRS
- Constellation: Scorpius
- Right ascension: 16^{h} 15^{m} 37.27028^{s}
- Declination: −08° 22′ 09.9821″
- Apparent magnitude (V): 5.503

Characteristics
- Evolutionary stage: main sequence
- Spectral type: G2 Va
- U−B color index: +0.18
- B−V color index: +0.64
- Variable type: Sun-like

Astrometry
Radial velocity (R_{v})	11.71±0.12 km/s
Proper motion (μ)	RA: +232.230 mas/yr Dec.: −495.378 mas/yr
Parallax (π)	70.7371±0.0631 mas
Distance	46.11 ± 0.04 ly (14.14 ± 0.01 pc)
Absolute magnitude (M_{V})	4.77

Details
Mass	1.02±0.01 M_{☉}
Radius	1.007±0.011 R_{☉}
Luminosity	1.043±0.005 L_{☉}
Surface gravity (log g)	4.437±0.013 cgs
Temperature	5,808±3 K
Metallicity [Fe/H]	0.041±0.003 dex
Rotation	22.7±0.5 days
Age	4.30+0.28 −0.27 Gyr

Other designations
- BD−07°4242, GC 21864, GJ 616, HD 146233, HIP 79672, HR 6060, SAO 141066, CCDM 16156-0822

Database references
SIMBAD	data
Exoplanet Archive	data

18 Scorpii is a solitary star located at a distance of some 46.1 light-years (14.13 parsecs) from the Sun in northern Scorpius, near the border with Ophiuchus. It has an apparent visual magnitude of 5.5, which is bright enough to be seen with the naked eye outside of urban areas. The star is drifting farther away with a radial velocity of +11.6.

18 Scorpii has some physical properties in common with the Sun, a G-type star. Cayrel de Strobel (1996) included it in her review of the stars most similar to the Sun, and Porto de Mello & da Silva (1997) identified it as a younger solar twin. Some scientists therefore believe the prospects for life in its vicinity are good.

== Characteristics ==
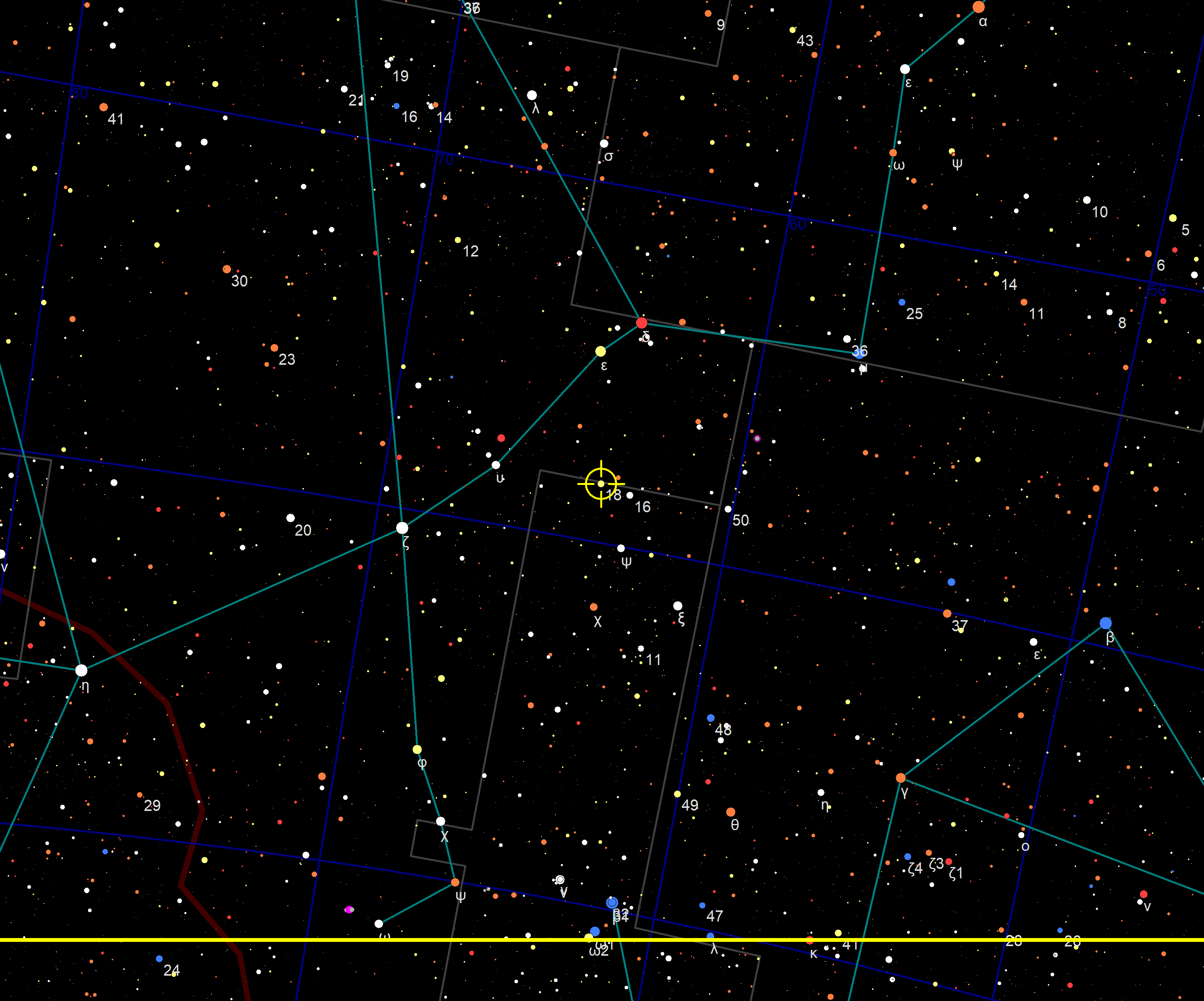
18 Scorpii is on the northern boundary of the constellation Scorpius. Before the year 1700 it lay in Ophiuchus but its high proper motion subsequently carried it over the border.

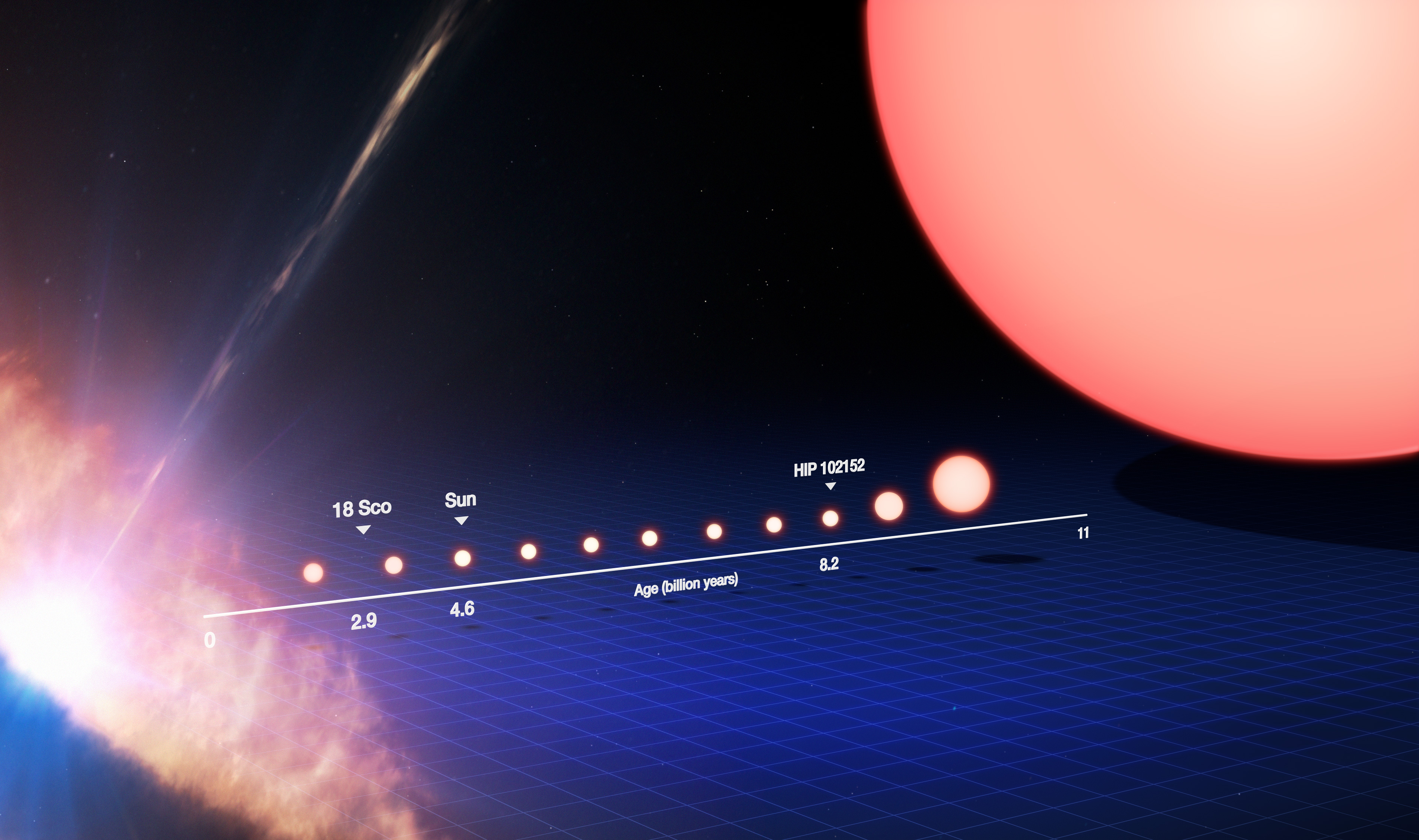
The age of 18 Scorpii, shown relative to the Sun, the older solar twin HD 197027, here annotated as HIP 102152 and the formation of the Milky Way

18 Scorpii is a main sequence star of spectral and luminosity type G2 Va, with the luminosity class of 'V' indicating it is generating energy through the nuclear fusion of hydrogen in its core region. Sousa et al. (2008) found its metallicity to be about 1.1 times that of the Sun, which means the abundance of elements other than hydrogen or helium is 10% greater. The radius of this star, as measured using interferometry by Bazot et al. (2011), is 101% the radius of the Sun. When combined with the results of asteroseismology measurements, this allows the mass of the star to be estimated as 102% of the Sun's mass. This star is radiating 106% of the Sun's luminosity from its outer atmosphere at an effective temperature of 5,433 K. It is this heat that gives the star the yellow-hued glow of a G-type star.

According to Lockwood (2002), it has a temporal photometric behavior very similar to the Sun. Its brightness variation over its entire activity cycle is 0.09%, about the same as the Sun's brightness variations during recent solar cycles. Using the technique of Zeeman-Doppler imaging, Petit et al. (2008) have detected its surface magnetic field, showing that its intensity and geometry are very similar to the large-scale solar magnetic field. The estimated period for the activity cycle of 18 Scorpii is about seven years, which is significantly shorter than the Sun's, and its overall chromospheric activity level is noticeably higher. Like the Sun, it has a hot corona with a temperature in the range of 1.5–2 MK and an X-ray luminosity of 8 ± 1.5 ergs s^{−1}.

Though 18 Scorpii is only slightly more metal-rich overall than the Sun, its lithium abundance is about three times as high; for this reason, Meléndez & Ramírez (2007) have suggested that 18 Scorpii be called a "quasi solar twin", reserving the term solar twin for stars (such as HIP 56948) that match the Sun, within the observational errors, for all parameters.

== Search for planets ==
18 Scorpii was identified in September 2003 by astrobiologist Margaret Turnbull from the University of Arizona in Tucson as one of the most promising nearby candidates for hosting life, based on her analysis of the HabCat list of stars. This is a solitary star, and does not display the level of excess infrared emission that would otherwise suggest the presence of unconsolidated circumstellar matter, such as a debris disk.

In a paper published in April 2017, a candidate planet was found orbiting 18 Scorpii (HD 146233) with a period of 2,529 days (6.92 yr), but subsequent studies in 2020 and 2023 found that the radial velocity signal originates from a stellar activity cycle. However, in 2023 evidence of a different candidate planet was found, which would be of super-Earth mass with a period of 19.9 days. The same planet was detected in 2025.

The 18 Scorpii planetary system
Companion (in order from star)	Mass	Semimajor axis (AU)	Orbital period (days)	Eccentricity	Inclination (°)	Radius
(unconfirmed)	≥6.77±0.86 M_{🜨}	—	19.8777±0.0062	0.38±0.16	—	—
