= Lynne Hillenbrand =

American astronomer

Lynne Anne Hillenbrand (born 1967) is an American astronomer whose research concerns the birth and aging of stars. She is a professor of astronomy at the California Institute of Technology.

== Education and career ==
Hillenbrand is originally from Bucks County, Pennsylvania, where she was born in 1967. After graduating from Council Rock High School in Bucks County in 1985, and from Princeton University in 1989, she became a graduate student at the University of Massachusetts Amherst. She completed her Ph.D. in 1995 with a dissertation on Herbig Ae/Be stars supervised by Stephen Strom.

She became a postdoctoral researcher at the University of California, Berkeley, from 1994 to 1997, and at the California Institute of Technology from 1997 to 2000. She continued at Caltech as an assistant professor beginning in 2000. She was promoted to associate professor in 2006 and full professor in 2010.

She chaired the US National Committee of the International Astronomical Union from 2014 to 2016.

== Recognition ==
Hillenbrand was named as a Fellow of the American Association for the Advancement of Science, in the 2023 class of fellows, "for excellence in studying the youngest sun-like stars and for significant contributions to the 2010 Astronomy and Astrophysics Decadal Survey".
