= G-type main-sequence star =

Stellar classification

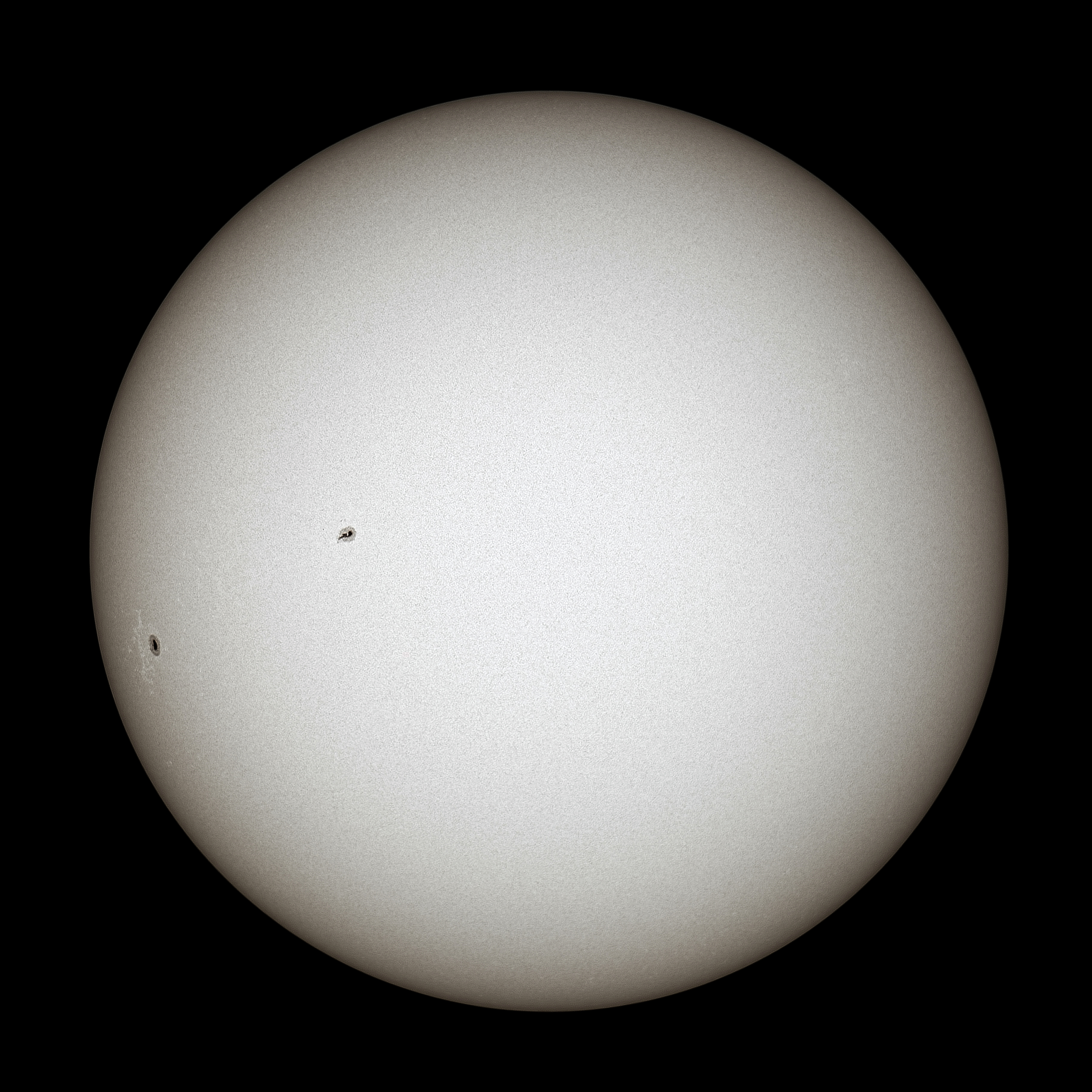
- The Sun, the star at the center of the Solar System, is a G-type main-sequence star.

Characteristics
- Type: Class of medium main sequence star.
- Mass range: 0.89–1.07 M_{☉}
- Temperature: 5,380–5,930 K
- Average luminosity: 0.55–1.35 L_{☉}

External links
- Media category
- Q5864

A G-type main-sequence star (Note: Also called a "G-type dwarf" or "yellow dwarf") is a main-sequence star of spectral type G. The spectral luminosity class is V. Such a star has about 0.9 to 1.1 solar masses and an effective temperature between about 5,300 and 6,000 K (5,000 and 5,700 °C; 9,100 and 10,000 °F). Like other main-sequence stars, a G-type main-sequence star converts the element hydrogen to helium in its core by means of nuclear fusion.

The Sun is an example of a G-type main-sequence star (more specifically a G2V star). Each second, the Sun fuses approximately 600 million tons of hydrogen into helium in a process known as the proton–proton chain (4 hydrogens form 1 helium), converting about 4 million tons of matter to energy. Besides the Sun, other well-known examples of G-type main-sequence stars include Alpha Centauri A, Tau Ceti, and 51 Pegasi.

== Description ==
The term yellow dwarf is a misnomer, because G-type stars actually range in color from white, for more luminous types like the Sun, to only very slightly yellowish for less massive and luminous G-type main-sequence stars. The Sun is in fact white, but it can often appear yellow, orange or red through Earth's atmosphere due to atmospheric Rayleigh scattering, especially at sunrise and sunset. In addition, although the term "dwarf" is used to contrast G-type main-sequence stars with giant stars or bigger, stars similar to the Sun still outshine 90% of the stars in the Milky Way galaxy (which are largely much dimmer orange dwarfs, red dwarfs, and white dwarfs which are much more common, the last of which being stellar remnants).

A G-type main-sequence star with the mass of the Sun will fuse hydrogen for approximately 10 billion years, until the hydrogen is exhausted at the core of the star. When this happens, the core begins to collapse and heat up, inducing intense hydrogen fusion in the surrounding shell. This shell fusion produces more energy, increasing outward pressure that pushes the outer layers outward, causing them to expand, cool, and darken as it passes through the subgiant branch and ultimately expanding into many times its previous size at the tip of the red giant phase, about 1 billion years after leaving the main sequence. After this, the star's degenerate helium core abruptly ignites in a helium flash fusing helium, and the star passes on to the horizontal branch. As the core helium supply starts running out, it passes onto the asymptotic giant branch where it expands even further and pulses violently, with the star's gravity insufficient to hold its outer envelope. This results in significant mass loss and shedding. The ejected material remains as a planetary nebula, radiating as it absorbs energetic photons from the photosphere. Eventually, the core begins to fade as nuclear reactions cease, and becomes a dense, compact white dwarf composed of carbon and oxygen from its previous helium fusion. This stellar remnant cools slowly from its high initial temperature as the nebula fades.

== Subdwarfs ==
There are subdwarf stars, that is stars of luminosity class VI, of spectral class G. These stars are fusing hydrogen in their cores like normal main-sequence stars, but due to their low metallicity they lie about two magnitudes below the main sequence (i.e. less luminous).

== Spectral standard stars ==
Properties of typical G-type main-sequence stars
Spectral type	Mass (M_{☉})	Radius (R_{☉})	Luminosity (L_{☉})	Effective temperature (K)	Color index (B − V)
G0V	1.07	1.100	1.35	5,930	0.60
G1V	1.04	1.060	1.19	5,860	0.62
G2V	1.00	1.012	1.02	5,770	0.65
G3V	0.99	1.002	0.97	5,720	0.66
G4V	0.985	0.991	0.92	5,680	0.67
G5V	0.98	0.977	0.88	5,660	0.68
G6V	0.97	0.949	0.80	5,600	0.70
G7V	0.95	0.927	0.73	5,550	0.71
G8V	0.93	0.914	0.63	5,480	0.73
G9V	0.89	0.853	0.55	5,380	0.78

The revised Yerkes Atlas system (Johnson & Morgan 1953) listed 11 G-type dwarf spectral standard stars; however, not all of these still exactly conform to this designation.

The "anchor points" of the MK spectral classification system among the G-type main-sequence dwarf stars, i.e. those standard stars that have remained unchanged over years, are Chara (G0V), the Sun (G2V), Kappa1 Ceti (G5V), 61 Ursae Majoris (G8V). Other primary MK standard stars include HD 115043 (G1V) and 16 Cygni B (G3V). The choices of G4 and G6 dwarf standards have changed slightly over the years among expert classifiers, but often-used examples include 70 Virginis (G4V) and 82 Eridani (G6V). There are not yet any generally agreed upon G7V and G9V standards.

== Habitability ==
G-type main sequence stars can provide habitability for life to develop, such as the Sun with life on Earth. They also live long enough to give life enough time to develop, between 7.9 and 13 billion years. The Sun's lifetime is about 10 billion years.

== Planets ==
Besides the Sun and its planets, some of the nearest G-type stars known to have planets include 61 Virginis, HD 102365, HD 147513, 47 Ursae Majoris (Chalawan), and Mu Arae (Cervantes).

Tau Ceti was once thought to host up to eight planets. As of July 2025, a 2025 study using ESPRESSO data failed to unambiguously detect any planets.

== See also ==
- G-dwarf problem
- Hertzsprung–Russell diagram
- Solar analog
- Star count, survey of stars
- Yellow hypergiant
