= List of resolved circumstellar disks =

This is a list of circumstellar disks that have published resolved images. Many of them are protoplanetary disks or debris disks. Only some are transitional disks between protoplanetary and debris. A few disks in this list are circumbinary disks.

== List of large disks ==
This list contains disks with a diameter larger or equal to 2 arcseconds and is sorted after their diameter in arcsecs.

Name	Image	RA (J2000)	Dec (J2000)	Distance (lys)	Host spectral type	Diameter (arcsec)	Diameter (AU)	Inclination (°)	Age (Myrs)	Type	Reference
Beta Pictoris		05^{h} 47^{m} 17.09^{s}	−51° 03′ 59.5″	62.9	A6V	200	4000	85	22	Debris	
Vega		18^{h} 36^{m} 56.34^{s}	+38° 47′ 01.3″	25.4	A0V	44.4	342	<45	400–700	Debris	
Fomalhaut		22^{h} 57^{m} 39.05^{s}	−29° 37′ 20.1″	23.5	A4V	44	318	68	450	Debris	
Epsilon Eridani		03^{h} 32^{m} 55.84^{s}	−09° 27′ 29.7″	10.5	K2	43	139		400–800	Debris	
AU Microscopii		20^{h} 45^{m} 09.53^{s}	−31° 20′ 27.2″	32.4	M1Ve	41	420		8–20	Debris	
61 Virginis		13^{h} 18^{m} 24.31^{s}	−18° 18′ 40.3″	27.7	G5	≥40	300	82	4,600	Debris	
Tau Ceti		01^{h} 44^{m} 04.08^{s}	−15° 56′ 14.9″	11.9	G8.5V	24	88		5,800	Debris	
HR 8799		23^{h} 07^{m} 28.71^{s}	+21° 08′ 03.3″	131	F0V	20	800	31	30–160	Debris	
HD 207129		21^{h} 48^{m} 15.75^{s}	−47° 18′ 13.0″	50.7	G0V	20	326	60	1,000–2,100	Debris	
HD 15115		02^{h} 26^{m} 16.25^{s}	+06° 17′ 33.1″	157	F4IV	19	920	86	25–500	Debris	
Gliese 581		15^{h} 19^{m} 27.51^{s}	−07° 43′ 19.4″	20.9	M3	19	120	30–70	2,000–8,000	Debris	
Kappa CrB		15^{h} 51^{m} 13.93^{s}	+35° 39′ 26.6″	98.2	K1IVa	19	560	61	>2,500	Debris	
Gamma Doradus		04^{h} 16^{m} 01.58^{s}	−51° 29′ 11.9″	66.7	F1V	19	380	70	400–2,190	Debris	
HD 38858		05^{h} 48^{m} 34.94^{s}	−04° 05′ 40.7″	49.6	G4V	17	260	44	200–9,400	Debris	
Eta Corvi		12^{h} 32^{m} 04.23^{s}	−16° 11′ 45.6″	59.7	F2V	16	300	35	1,000–2,000	Debris	
Tau 042021		04^{h} 20^{m} 21.44^{s}	+28° 13′ 49.2″	424	M1	16	2000	88		protoplanetary	
q^{1} Eridani		01^{h} 42^{m} 29.32^{s}	−53° 44′ 27.0″	56.6	F9V	15	268	77	1,400	Debris	
99 Herculis		18^{h} 07^{m} 01.54^{s}	+30° 33′ 43.7″	50.9	F7V+K4V	15	240		6,000–10,000	circumbinary debris	
TW Hydrae		11^{h} 01^{m} 51.97^{s}	−34° 42′ 17.6″	184	K7Ve	15	904	<7	10–20	protoplanetary	
HD 15745		02^{h} 32^{m} 55.81^{s}	+37° 20′ 01.4″	209	F2V	15	960	67	100	Debris	
HD 202628		21^{h} 18^{m} 27.27^{s}	−43° 20′ 04.7″	77.6	G1.5V	14	331	57	1,100	Debris	
BD+40 45 (GJ14)		00^{h} 17^{m} 06.37^{s}	+40° 56′ 53.87″	48	K7V	14	198	64	500	Debris	
HD 92945		10^{h} 43^{m} 28.27^{s}	−29° 03′ 51.4″	70.1	K0	13	280	65	100–300	Debris	
Eta Crucis (HD105211)		12^{h} 06^{m} 52.90^{s}	−64° 36′ 49.43″	64	F2V	13	263	66	1000	Debris	
Denebola		11^{h} 49^{m} 03.58^{s}	+14° 34′ 19.4″	36.2	A3V	13	140	55	45	Debris	
HD 139664		15^{h} 41^{m} 11.38^{s}	−44° 39′ 40.3″	57.1	F5V	12	218	87	300	Debris	
HD 111520		12^{h} 50^{m} 19.72^{s}	−49° 51′ 49.0″	353	F5V	12	1300	88		Debris	
Dracula's Chivito		23^{h} 09^{m} 43.645^{s}	+67° 23′ 38.94″	979	A9	11	3300	82		protoplanetary	
HR 2562		06^{h} 50^{m} 01.02^{s}	−60° 14′ 56.92″	111	F5V	11	380	>80	300	Debris	
HIP 17439		03^{h} 44^{m} 09.17^{s}	−38° 16′ 54.4″	52.2	K2V	11	180		760	Debris	
HD 61005		07^{h} 35^{m} 47.46^{s}	−32° 12′ 14.0″	119	G8V	10	134	86	30–40	Debris	
Gamma Trianguli (HD 14055)		02^{h} 17^{m} 18.86^{s}	+33° 50′ 49.91″	116	A1V	10	360	81	300	Debris	
HD 107146		12^{h} 19^{m} 06.50^{s}	+16° 32′ 53.9″	89.7	G2V	10	271	19	8–20	Debris	
HD 20794		03^{h} 19^{m} 55.65^{s}	−43° 04′ 11.2″	19.6	G8V	10	60	50	3,900–11,300	Debris	
HD 53143		06^{h} 59^{m} 59.66^{s}	−61° 20′ 10.3″	59.7	G9V	10	180	56	1,000	Debris	
HD 170773		18^{h} 33^{m} 00.92^{s}	−39° 53′ 31.3″	121	F5V	10	386	33	1,290	Debris	
49 Ceti		01^{h} 34^{m} 37.78^{s}	−15° 40′ 34.9″	186	A1V	10	560	73	40	Debris	
HD 106906		12^{h} 17^{m} 53.19^{s}	−55° 58′ 31.9″	300	F5V	10	920	85	13	Debris	
HD 206893		21^{h} 45^{m} 21.90^{s}	−12° 47′ 00.1″	133	F5V+L5–L9	9.5	388	45	50–700	circumbinary debris	
Omicron2 Cancri		08^{h} 57^{m} 35.20^{s}	+15° 34′ 52.63″	159	F0IV	9.0	438	72	1200	Debris	
HD 158352		17^{h} 28^{m} 49.65^{s}	+00° 19′ 50.25″	208	A8V	8.5	540	81	900	Debris	
Gamma Ophiuchi		17^{h} 47^{m} 53.56^{s}	+02° 42′ 26.2″	94.9	A0V	8.4	248	68	300	Debris	
HD 163296		17^{h} 56^{m} 21.26^{s}	−21° 57′ 21.6″	329	A3V	8	>1000	47	5	protoplanetary	
AB Aurigae		04^{h} 55^{m} 45.93^{s}	+30° 33′ 03.6″	470	A0Ve	8	1160	30	4	protoplanetary	
HD 95086		10^{h} 57^{m} 03.02^{s}	−68° 40′ 02.5″	274	A8	7.6	640	30	17	Debris	
UY Aurigae		04^{h} 51^{m} 47.37^{s}	+30° 47′ 13.9″	457	M0+M2.5	7.4	1040	42		circumbinary protoplanetary	
HD 141569A		15^{h} 49^{m} 57.76^{s}	−03° 55′ 16.2″	378	A0Ve	7.1	820	58	5	Transitional	
WL 16		16^{h} 27^{m} 02.34^{s}	−24° 37′ 27.2″	408	B8–A7	7	880	62	1.2	protoplanetary	
Fomalhaut C		22^{h} 48^{m} 04.49^{s}	−24° 22′ 07.72″	25	M4V	6.9	53	44	440	Debris	
HD 32297		05^{h} 02^{m} 27.44^{s}	+07° 27′ 39.7″	434	A5V	6.6	244	84	30–40	Debris	
HD 35650		05^{h} 24^{m} 30.17^{s}	−38° 58′ 10.8″	58.7	K6V	6.0	108	89	5–20	Debris	
HD 205674		21^{h} 37^{m} 21.11^{s}	−18° 26′ 28.24″	182	F3/5IV	5.7	320	56	800	Debris	
TYC 5709-354-1		19^{h} 23^{m} 17.03^{s}	−07° 40′ 55.08″	434.9		5.6	760	44	3.8-7.5	transitional	
HD 16743		02^{h} 39^{m} 07.56^{s}	−52° 56′ 05.3″	189	F0/2III/IV	5.5	315	87	10–50	Debris	
HD 38206		05^{h} 43^{m} 21.67^{s}	−18° 33′ 26.9″	233	A0V	5.2	368	83	42	Debris	
HD 104860		12^{h} 04^{m} 33.73^{s}	+66° 20′ 11.7″	147	F8	5.1	228	58	19–635	Debris	
HD 30447		04^{h} 46^{m} 49.53^{s}	−26° 18′ 08.8″	261	F3V	5	400		10–40	Debris	
HD 141943		15^{h} 53^{m} 27.29^{s}	+15° 50′ 02.4″	219	G2V	5	334	85	17–32	Debris	
HD 202917		21^{h} 20^{m} 49.96^{s}	−53° 02′ 03.2″	140	G7V	5	214	70	10–40	Debris	
BD-20 951		04^{h} 52^{m} 49.52^{s}	−19° 55′ 01.68″	203		5	244	98		Debris	
Flying Saucer		16^{h} 28^{m} 13.70^{s}	−24° 31′ 39.0″	391		4.8	580	85			
HD 100546		11^{h} 33^{m} 25.44^{s}	−70° 11′ 41.2″	359	B9	4.6	500	42	5–10	protoplanetary	
IRAS 08235-4316		08^{h} 25^{m} 15.94^{s}	−43° 26′ 28.36″	>623		4.6	880			protoplanetary	
HD 97048		11^{h} 08^{m} 03.32^{s}	−77° 39′ 17.5″	515	A0	4.5	670		3	protoplanetary	
HD 105		00^{h} 05^{m} 52.54^{s}	−41° 45′ 11.04″	127	G0V	4.4	170	49	45	Debris	
HD 377		00^{h} 08^{m} 25.75^{s}	+06° 37′ 00.5″	128	G2V	4.4	172	85	147–250	Debris	
Elias 2-27		16^{h} 26^{m} 45.03^{s}	−24° 23′ 07.8″	378	M0	4.3	500	56	0.8	protoplanetary	
IM Lupi		15^{h} 56^{m} 09.23^{s}	−37° 56′ 05.9″	517	M0	4.2	666	53	1.1	protoplanetary	
HD 131835		14^{h} 56^{m} 54.47^{s}	−35° 41′ 43.66″	423		4.1	210	105		Debris	
HD 182681		19^{h} 26^{m} 56.48^{s}	−29° 44′ 35.62″	231	B8.5V	4.0	286	76	110	Debris	
HD 21997		03^{h} 31^{m} 53.65^{s}	−25° 36′ 50.9″	235	A3	4	300	33	40	Debris	
Gomez's Hamburger		18^{h} 09^{m} 13.43^{s}	−32° 10′ 48.0″	453	A0	4.0	520	86		protoplanetary	
HD 142527		15^{h} 56^{m} 41.89^{s}	−42° 19′ 23.3″	509	F6III+M6	3.9	600	27	2–5	circumbinary protoplanetary	
Butterfly Star		04^{h} 33^{m} 16.45^{s}	+22° 53′ 20.7″	522		3.9	620	87		protoplanetary	
GG Tauri A		04^{h} 32^{m} 30.30^{s}	+17° 31′ 41.0″	457	M0+M2+M3	3.7	800	37	1	circumtriple protoplanetary	
HD 181327		19^{h} 22^{m} 58.94^{s}	−54° 32′ 17.0″	169	F5–F6	3.3	172	30	23	Debris	
GM Aurigae		04^{h} 55^{m} 10.98^{s}	+30° 21′ 59.7″	522	K5.5	3.1	500	53		protoplanetary	
HD 35841		05^{h} 26^{m} 36.59^{s}	−22° 29′ 23.7″	313	F3V	3	288		10–40	Debris	
HD 160305		17^{h} 41^{m} 49.04^{s}	−50° 43′ 28.04″	215		3	208	82		Debris	
TWA 25		12^{h} 15^{m} 30.72^{s}	−39° 48′ 42.6″	176	M0.5	2.9	156	75	7–13	Debris	
RX J1615.3-3255		16^{h} 15^{m} 20.23^{s}	−32° 55′ 05.1″	514	K5	2.9	459	47	4.5	protoplanetary	
V1094 Scorpii		16^{h} 08^{m} 36.18^{s}	−39° 23′ 02.5″	489	K6	2.9	440			protoplanetary	
IRAS 04158+2805		04^{h} 18^{m} 58.14^{s}	+28° 12′ 23.3″	425	M5–M6	2.8	370	62	1–3	circumbinary protoplanetary	
HD 192758		20^{h} 18^{m} 15.79^{s}	−42° 51′ 36.3″	219	F0V	2.8	190	58	45–83	Debris	
HD 191089		20^{h} 09^{m} 05.21^{s}	−26° 13′ 26.5″	170	F5V	2.8	146	30	8-20	Debris	
TWA 7		10^{h} 42^{m} 30.11^{s}	−33° 40′ 16.2″	113	M3.2	2.6	90	28	4.4–13	Debris	
Proplyd 216-0939		05^{h} 35^{m} 21.58^{s}	−05° 09′ 38.96″	1305	K5	2.6	1050	75–80		protoplanetary	
Oph 163131		16^{h} 31^{m} 31.25^{s}	−24° 26′ 28″	479	K4–K5	2.5	368	80		protoplanetary	
DG Tauri B		04^{h} 27^{m} 02.55^{s}	+26^{h} 05^{m} 30.9^{s}	457		2.5	348	63		protoplanetary	
HD 164249		18^{h} 03^{m} 03.41^{s}	−51° 38′ 56.43″	161	F6V	2.5	124	<50	23	Debris	
AS 209		16^{h} 49^{m} 15.31^{s}	−14° 22′ 08.6″	395	K4Ve	2.4	290	35		protoplanetary	
DoAr 25		16^{h} 26^{m} 23.68^{s}	−24° 43′ 13.9″	450	K5	2.4	330	67	2.1	protoplanetary	
Proplyd 114-426		05^{h} 35^{m} 11.35^{s}	−05° 24′ 26.4″	1305	M0	2.3	920	80		protoplanetary	
GSC 07396-00759 (see V4046 Sagittarii)		18^{h} 14^{m} 22.07^{s}	−32° 46′ 10.13″	234	M1V	2.2	156	>79	23	Debris	
CQ Tauri		05^{h} 35^{m} 58.47^{s}	+24° 44′ 54.1″	528	F2	2.2	360	35	10	protoplanetary	
FS Tauri B		04^{h} 22^{m} 00.69^{s}	+26° 57′ 33.3″	456	K5	2.1	276	74		protoplanetary	
PDS 70		14^{h} 08^{m} 10.15^{s}	−41° 23′ 52.5″	370	K7	2.1	240	50	5.4	protoplanetary	
Elias 2-24		16^{h} 26^{m} 24.09^{s}	−24° 16′ 13.3″	453	K6	2.1	292	30		protoplanetary	
HR 4796A		12^{h} 36^{m} 01.07^{s}	−39° 52′ 10.0″	325	A0V	2.1	154	77	9	Debris	
AA Tauri		04^{h} 34^{m} 55.42^{s}	+24° 28′ 53.2″	473		2.0	285	60		protoplanetary	

== List of small disks ==
There are hundreds of small resolved disks. This list only contains a selection of disks with d<2 arcsec.

Name	Image	RA (J2000)	Dec (J2000)	Distance (lys)	Host spectral type	Diameter (arcsec)	Diameter (AU)	Inclination (°)	Age (Myrs)	Type	Reference
HH 30		04^{h} 31^{m} 37.47^{s}	+18° 12′ 24.8″	460	M0	1.9	261	85		protoplanetary	
GW Orionis		05^{h} 29^{m} 08.39^{s}	+11° 52′ 12.67″	1330	G8V	1.7	338	38		protoplanetary	
CI Tauri		04^{h} 33^{m} 52.00^{s}	+22° 50′ 30.2″	518		1.7	264	45	2	protoplanetary	
LDN 1448 IRS 3B		03^{h} 25^{m} 36.3^{s}	+30° 45′ 15.0″	939		1.6	460	27		circumbinary protoplanetary	
HL Tauri		04^{h} 31^{m} 38.47^{s}	+18° 13′ 58.1″	457	K5	1.4	194	47	1–2	protoplanetary	
HD 121617		13^{h} 57^{m} 41.13^{s}	−47° 00′ 34.25″	385		1.4	164	136		Debris	
HD 135344B		15^{h} 15^{m} 48.44^{s}	−37° 09′ 16.0″	443	F8V	1.2	160	16		protoplanetary	
LkCa 15		04^{h} 39^{m} 17.78^{s}	+22° 21′ 03.5″	457	K5	1.2	170		3–5	protoplanetary	
HV Tauri C		04^{h} 39^{m} 17.78^{s}	+22° 21′ 03.5″		K6	1.2		108		protoplanetary	
2MASS 1612 (RIK 113)		16^{h} 12^{m} 06.68^{s}	−30° 10′ 27.08″	431	M0.5	1.2	230	40	5	transitional	
HD 169142		18^{h} 24^{m} 29.78^{s}	−29° 46′ 49.4″	374	F1V	1.1	120	13	6	protoplanetary	
Oph IRS 48		16^{h} 27^{m} 37.19^{s}	−24° 30′ 35″	444		1.1	156	50		transitional	
MWC 758		05^{h} 30^{m} 27.51^{s}	+25° 19′ 57.2″	522	A	1.1	170	21	3.5	protoplanetary	
BHB2007 11		17^{h} 11^{m} 23.17752^{s}	−27° 24′ 31.5288″	532		1.1	180	40	0.1–0.2	circumbinary protoplanetary	
HK Tauri B		04^{h} 31^{m} 50.60^{s}	24° 24′ 15.50″	420	M2	1	136	83		protoplanetary	
HD 114082		13^{h} 09^{m} 16.19^{s}	−60° 18′ 30.05″	310		1	70	83		Debris	
Proplyd 132-1832		05^{h} 35^{m} 13.21^{s}	−05° 18′ 32.3″	1305		1	400			protoplanetary	
HD 129590		14^{h} 44^{m} 30.96^{s}	−39° 59′ 20.6″	445	G3V	1	135	75		Debris	
HD 34700A		05^{h} 19^{m} 41.41^{s}	+05° 38′ 42.8″	408	G0	1	350	42	5	protoplanetary	
HD 100453A		11^{h} 33^{m} 05.57^{s}	−54° 19′ 28.5″	340	A9Ve	0.8	83	30	6.5	protoplanetary	
PDS 144N		15^{h} 49^{m} 15.53^{s}	−26° 00′ 50.04″	473	A2 IVe	0.8	116	83	5-10	protoplanetary	
HD 117214		13^{h} 30^{m} 08.97^{s}	−58° 29′ 04.4″	351	F6V	0.8	90	71	17	Debris	
AK Scorpii		16^{h} 54^{m} 44.85^{s}	−36° 53′ 18.56″	459	F5	0.8	106	71		circumbinary protoplanetary	
HD 115600		13^{h} 19^{m} 19.54^{s}	−59° 28′ 20.4″	358	F2–F3V	0.8	92	80	15	Debris	
2MASS J04442713+2512164		04^{h} 44^{m} 27.143^{s}	+25° 12′ 16.435″	467	M7.25	0.8	112	50	1	Protoplanetary	
PDS 111		05^{h} 24^{m} 37.25^{s}	−08° 42′ 01.71″	515	G2	0.7	190		16	Protoplanetary	
Haro 5-34 (SO 1274)		05^{h} 39^{m} 54.66^{s}	−02° 46′ 34.13″	1305	K7	0.6	257		4	Protoplanetary	
