= Gomez (disambiguation) =

Gómez is a common Spanish surname. Origin: Visigothic guma, meaning "man", later a first name, Gome and the patronym son of Gome.

Gomez may also refer to:

== Places ==
- Gómez, Buenos Aires, Argentina
- Lake Gómez, near the city of Junín, Buenos Aires Province
- Gomez, Kentucky, United States, an unincorporated community
- Gomez, Texas, United States, a small community in Terry County, Texas
- Gómez Municipality, Nueva Esparta, Venezuela
- Gómez, Chiriquí, Panama
- Gomez Nunatak, a nunatak in Palmer Land, Antarctica

== Other uses ==
- Gomez (band), an English indie rock band
- Gómez (given name), a list of people and fictional characters
- Gomez, application performance monitoring software. See Compuware
- Gōmēz, cattle urine used for ritual purification in Zoroastrianism
- Gomez's Hamburger, protoplanetary nebula in the constellation Saggirarius
