= 2MASS J04202144+2813491 =

Protoplanetary disk in Taurus

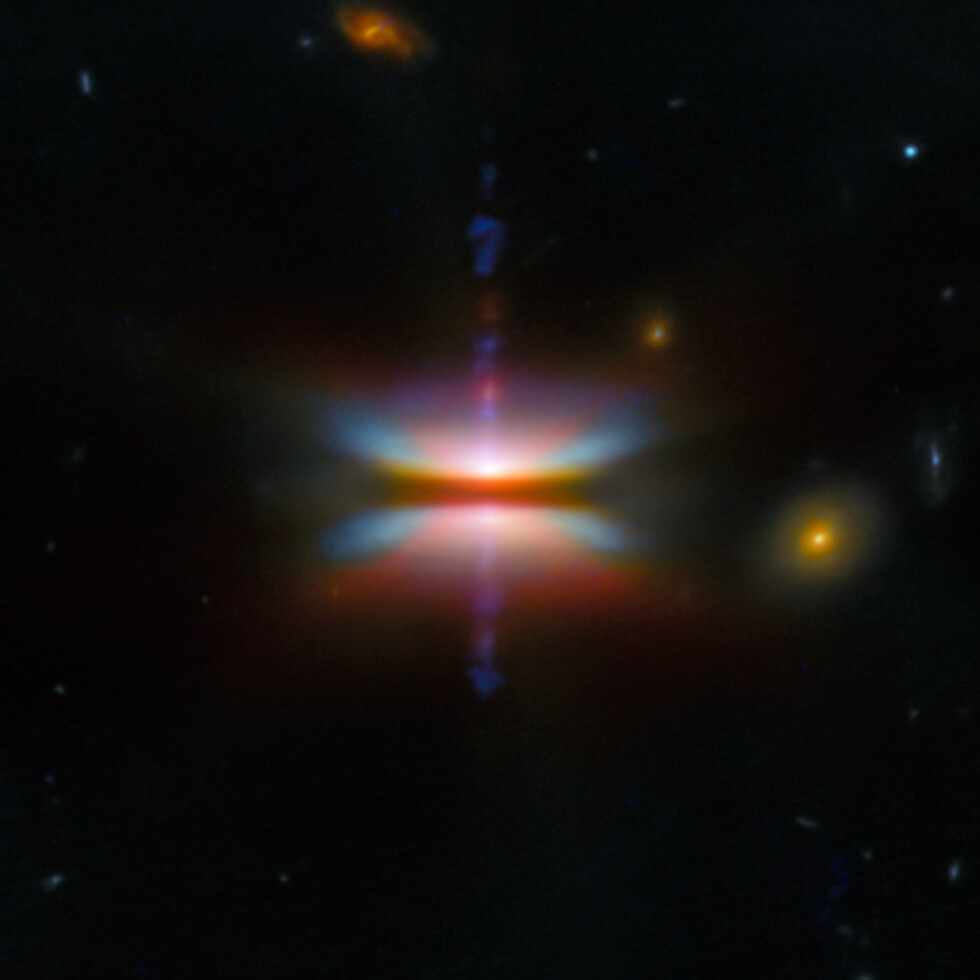
- 2MASS J04202144+2813491 imaged by James Webb

Observation data Epoch J2000 Equinox J2000
- Constellation: Taurus
- Right ascension: 04^{h} 20^{m} 21.44^{s}
- Declination: +28° 13′ 49.2″
- Apparent magnitude (V): 18.82±0.47

Characteristics
- Evolutionary stage: T Tauri star
- Spectral type: M1±2
- Variable type: variable nebula

Astrometry
Radial velocity (R_{v})	7.4 km/s
Distance	424 ly (130 pc)

Details
Mass	0.3–0.4 M_{☉}
Luminosity	0.85 L_{☉}
Temperature	3700 K
Age	approx. 1–2 Myr

Other designations
- HGBS J042021.4+281348, SSTtau 042021.4+281349, TIC 58366336, WISE J042021.44+281349.0, [LLQ2015] TMO 44

Database references
SIMBAD	data

2MASS J04202144+2813491 (also known as Tau 042021) is an edge-on protoplanetary disk in the Taurus Molecular Cloud.

The star is hidden behind the edge-on disk. Early estimates found that it has a mass of 0.272 ±0.009 M_{☉}, but a later study did find a higher mass of 0.3–0.4 M_{☉}. The object is located on the western edge of the 130-parsec distant LDN 1495 cloud, which is part of the Taurus clouds. One study used CO emission to measure the radial velocity of the disk, which is similar to the radial velocity of the LDN 1495 cloud. The spectral type was measured to be M1 with the Hobby Eberly Telescope, making it a red dwarf. Emission lines from H-alpha and calcium are noted to be present in the spectrum. Ultraviolet excess is seen as an indicator for accretion. The star accretes at least 2×10^{−11} Solar mass/year of gas from its surrounding protoplanetary disk. This was measured from hydrogen recombination lines originating in accretion shocks.

== Protoplanetary disk ==
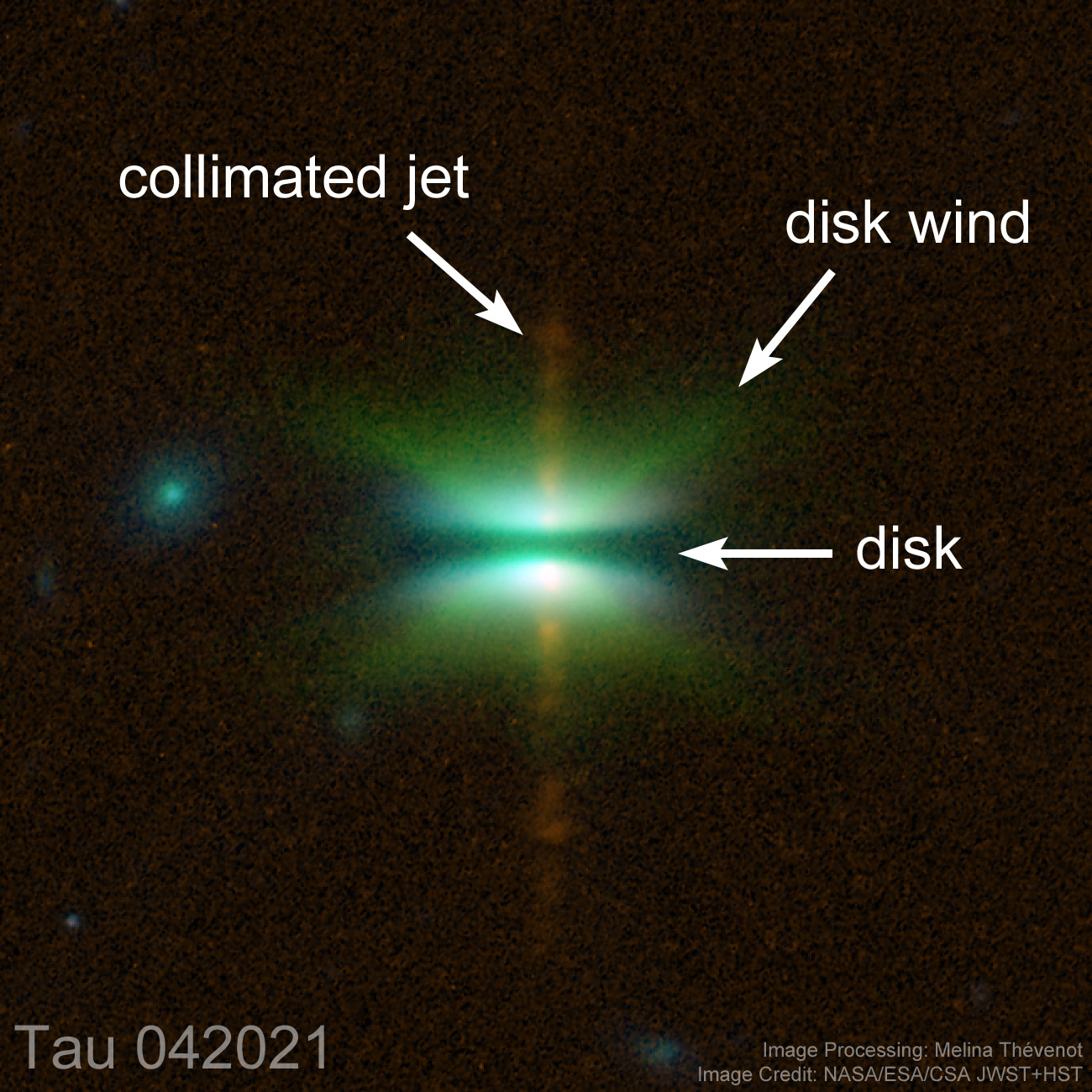
The disk, disk wind, jet and counter-jet of Tau 042021. The blue object on the left is a background galaxy

The disk was discovered in 2009 as an infrared excess object with Spitzer in Taurus and was resolved in the same work with I-band CFHT images. The disk blocks the light of the star, making it possible to observe the disk without a coronagraph. The radius of the disk was first measured at 2.5 arcseconds or 350 astronomical units (AU). The disk was classified as a class II disk, meaning the disk contains dust and gas, but is more evolved than class 0/I disks. The dust mass of the disk is estimated to be between 163 and 432 M_{🜨}, depending on the model. Variability of the disk is seen from the optical to the mid-infrared.

The disk was first observed in carbon monoxide (CO) with the Five College Radio Astronomy Observatory. Archival ALMA observations showed a very edge-on disk with CO being at very high heights above the disk. The continuum showed a similar size as the optical, with a radius of 285±14 AU. The radius of the disk in CO was identified to be much larger at 609±18 AU. The gaseous disk was further analysed with ALMA CO observations. This new CO map does show that the disk extends up to 8 arcseconds or 1000 AU on the south (blueshifted) side. The north (redshifted) side is affected by nebulosity. This makes the disk much larger than in the optical and infrared. Previous works already showed strong evidence of strong dust settling. A study showed that dust particles up to ≥10 μm in size are coupled to the gas up to the disk surface. Particles larger than 100 μm are located around ten times closer to the mid-plane. The inner disk is detected in CO and water (H_{2}O) emission with MIRI MRS. This emission originates from around 1 AU, but is scattered on dust particles up to 100 AU. MIRI MRS also detected resolved polycyclic aromatic hydrocarbon (PAH) in the disk, which is also seen in the unresolved Spitzer spectrum.

=== The jet ===
In 2014 observations with Hubble ACS were published. This observation detected a Herbig-Haro object with clumps in a jet and counter-jet, extending up to 8 arcseconds from the star. The jet is detected in a Hubble F606W image, tracing mainly H-alpha, but possibly also other emission lines. Additional emission lines of the jet were detected and resolved with MIRI MRS. These are ionized neon, iron, nickel, argon and sulfur. The jet was also observed with NIRSpec in ionized iron emission. The researchers measured a semi-opening angle of 4.9°±1.7° for the jet.

=== Disk wind ===
One major discovery was an X-shaped feature in 7.7 and 12.8 μm images. This was interpreted as a possible disk wind. Observations with MIRI MRS confirmed this feature as a disk wind. This observation detected molecular hydrogen (H_{2}) in an X-shape. The H_{2} emission does show a semi-opening angle of 35°±5° and likely creates the X-shaped feature in the 7.7 and 12.8 μm images. The H_{2} outflow is interpreted as a magnetohydrodynamic wind (MHD wind) and has a gas mass of M_{H2}≈5.4×10^{−7} M_{☉}, which means that the disk loses 6.5×10^{−9} Solar mass/year. The disk wind in H_{2} emission was also observed with NIRSpec.

The Tau 042021 planetary system
Companion (in order from star)	Mass	Semimajor axis (AU)	Orbital period (years)	Eccentricity	Inclination (°)	Radius
protoplanetary disk	1–1000 AU				>85°	—

== See also ==
- List of resolved circumstellar disks

examples of other edge-on disks

- Beta Pictoris (debris disks)
- AU Microscopii (debris disks)
- HD 15115 (debris disk)
- Dracula's Chivito (protoplanetary)
- Gomez's Hamburger (protoplanetary)
- Proplyd 114-426 (protoplanetary)
