= Butterfly Star =

Young stellar object in the constellation Taurus

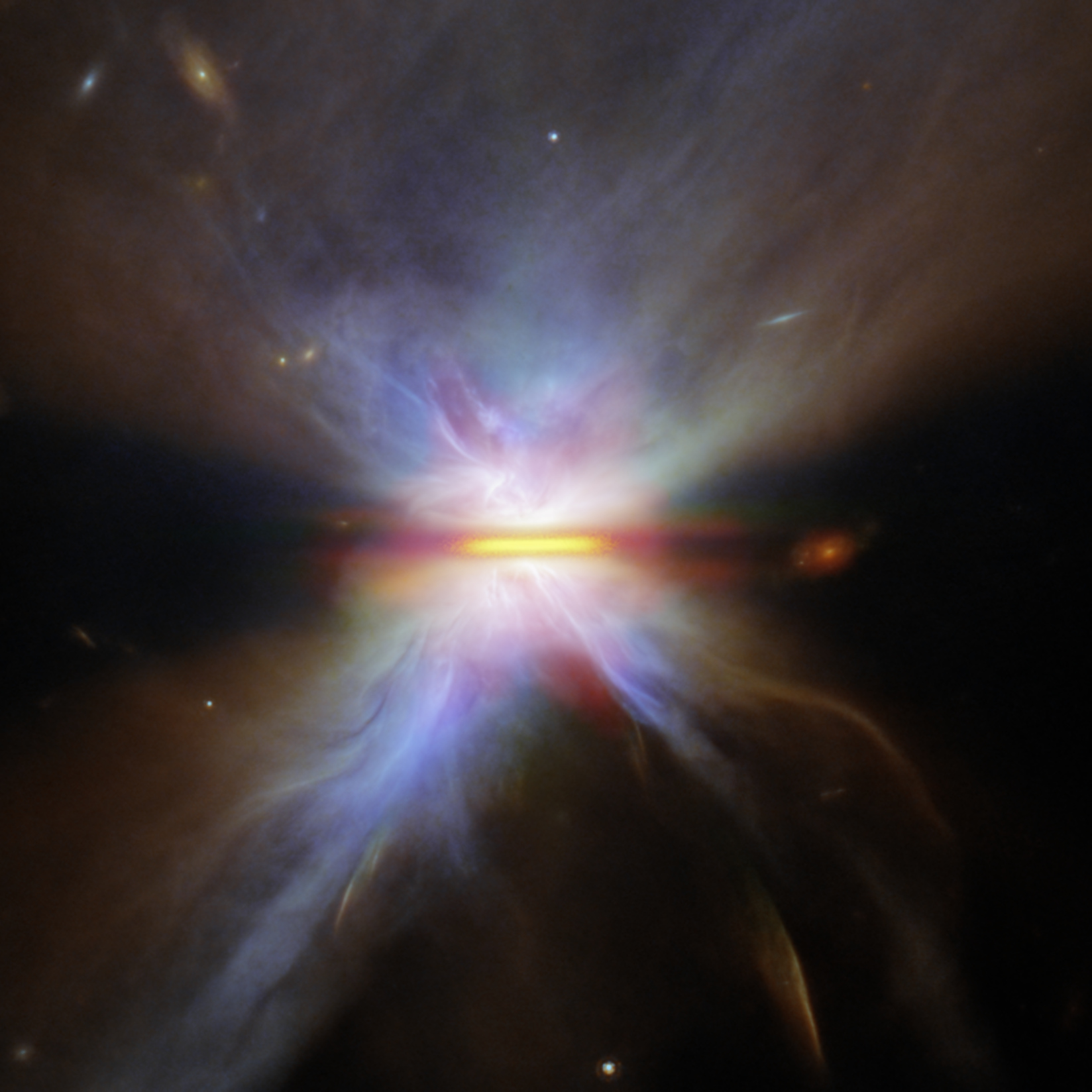
- The Butterfly Star imaged by the James Webb Space Telescope

Observation data Epoch J2000 Equinox ICRS
- Constellation: Taurus
- Right ascension: 04^{h} 33^{m} 16.50096^{s}
- Declination: +22° 53′ 20.4000″

Characteristics
- Evolutionary stage: young stellar object
- Apparent magnitude (J): 14.682±0.059
- Apparent magnitude (H): 12.900±0.060
- Apparent magnitude (K): 11.718±0.048

Astrometry
Radial velocity (R_{v})	832.2±0.2 km/s
Distance	~520 ly (~160 pc)

Details
Mass	1.6±0.4 M_{☉}

Other designations
- Butterfly Star, EPIC 247590222, IRAS 04302+2247, 2MASS J04331650+2253204

Database references
SIMBAD	data

The Butterfly Star, often called by its designation IRAS 04302+2247, is a young stellar object in the constellation Taurus, near the dark nebula LDN 1536b in the Taurus molecular cloud. Classified as a class I protostar, it is surrounded by an edge-on protoplanetary disk and a bipolar reflection nebula that resembles the wings of a butterfly; the star itself is obscured by the disk.

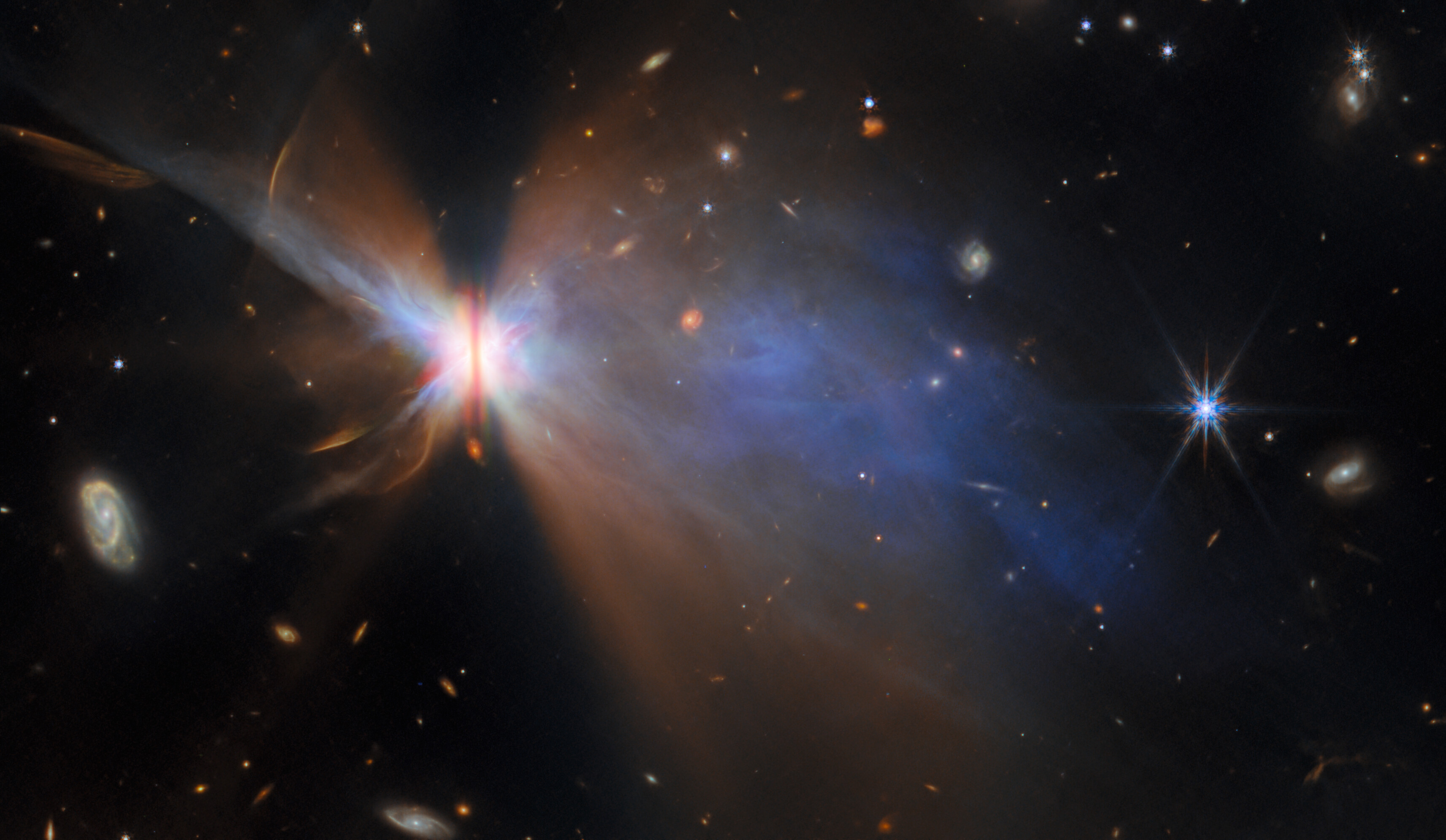
The Butterfly Star imaged by the James Webb Space Telescope

This object was first catalogued in 1990 by the IRAS satellite. Its discovery was announced in 1997, when it was nicknamed the "Butterfly star in Taurus" due to the appearance of its surrounding nebula. The name Butterfly Star has been used in subsequent studies and was officially approved by the IAU Working Group on Star Names on 13 June 2026.

The Butterfly Star's circumstellar disk is seen nearly edge-on, with an inclination of 87° to the plane of the sky. The gas disk has a radius of 3.9″ (620 au), while the dust disk is smaller with a radius of 310 au. An inner, potentially planet-forming region of the disk is within ≲80–120 au. The disk is thought to have a total mass of 0.07 M_{☉}. The central star is likely a T Tauri star.

== See also ==
- List of resolved circumstellar disks
- Flying Saucer, another edge-on protoplanetary disk
- HH 30, another edge-on protoplanetary disk
- Tau 042021, another edge-on protoplanetary disk
