= Gómez (given name) =

Gómez is a given name which may refer to:

People:

- Gómez González (disambiguation)
- Gómez Manrique (c. 1412–c. 1490), Spanish poet, soldier, politician and dramatist
- Gómez Núñez (fl. 1071–1141), Galician and Portuguese political and military leader in the Kingdom of León
- Gómez Pereira (1500–1567), Spanish philosopher, doctor and natural humanist
- Gómez Pérez Dasmariñas (1519–1593), Spanish politician, diplomat, military officer and seventh Governor and Captain-General of the Philippines
- Gómez Suárez de Figueroa (disambiguation)

Fictional characters:

- Gomez Addams, patriarch of the Addams family of cartoons, a TV series, films and plays
- Gomez, the main character of the indie puzzle-platform game Fez
