= Flying Saucer (protoplanetary disk) =

Astronomical object in Ophiuchus

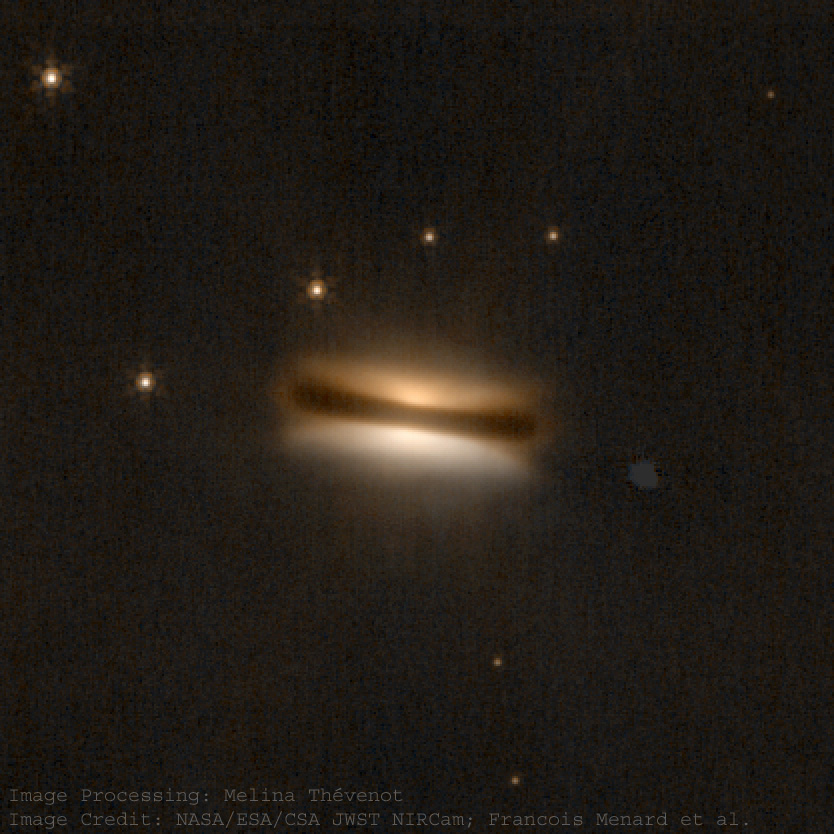
- JWST image of the Flying Saucer disk

Observation data Epoch J2000 Equinox J2000
- Constellation: Ophiuchus
- Right ascension: 16^{h} 28^{m} 13.697^{s}
- Declination: −24° 31′ 39.846″

Characteristics
- Evolutionary stage: young stellar object
- Spectral type: M1

Astrometry
Distance	390 ly (120 pc)

Details
Mass	0.58 ±0.01 M_{☉}
Temperature	3500 K

Other designations
- BKLT J162813-243139, 2MASS J16281370-2431391, EPIC 203891877, TIC 175744769, WISE J162813.70-243139.1, SSTc2d J162813.7-243139, USNO-B1.0 0654-00363984, Gaia DR3 6049103961995537664

Database references
SIMBAD	data

The Flying Saucer (2MASS J16281370-2431391) is a protoplanetary disk in the Rho Ophiuchi cloud complex.

== Discovery and name ==
The 2MASS source J16281370-2431391 was identified as resolved circumstellar disk with the New Technology Telescope in 2003. Follow-up observations with the Very Large Telescope (instrument: ISAAC) did show that the object had a dust lane in the middle and two reflection nebulae with different colors. The first author, Nicolas Grosso, recalled their first impression of the VLT follow-up image: "That is when we looked at each other and, with one voice, immediately decided to nickname it the Flying Saucer!" The name likely comes from the same-named UFO type called flying saucer. The name Flying Saucer was officially approved by the IAU Working Group on Star Names on 13 June 2026.

== Central star ==
The star is hidden behind dust and not much is known about it. ALMA observations did measure the rotation of the gas inside the disk and researchers used this measurement to determine the mass of the star, which is 58% the mass of the sun.

== Disk properties ==
The disk has a radius of 2.15 arcseconds. The Rho Ophiuchi Complex is about 140 parsec distant. The researchers used this distance to measure a disk radius of 300 astronomical units (AU). The inclination of the disk was measured to be 86°±1°. This work also found that the two nebulae have different colors. Observations with the Spitzer spectrograph showed large dust grains with a size of 5-10 μm beyond 50 AU. The CO absorption detected with ALMA was used to measure a temperature of 5-7 Kelvin (K) for large dust grains at a distance of 100 AU from the star. The researchers find that the disk could have a large reservoir of mass needed for planet formation. This low temperature is in disagreement with observations of other disks, such as DM Tauri, which has a dust temperature of 20 K at 100 AU. One team suspects that the measured disk temperature is a mix of low temperature large grains and higher temperature small grains. The previous ALMA study did determine only the large grain temperature of the Flying Saucer. Researchers used JWST NIRSpec to observe the disk in silhouette against the PAH-emitting background, as well as the exited H_{2} emission of the background nebula. The researchers found that the midplane of the disk has a larger radius for small dust grains at around 235 AU. The disk size for large grains was previously measured at 190 AU with ALMA. The researchers found that dust settling is inefficient in the Flying Saucer for grains as large as tens of microns.

=== Chemical composition ===
Observations with Spitzer tentatively detected emission due to molecular hydrogen and Polycyclic aromatic hydrocarbons (PAHs). Observations with AKARI detected water ice bands in this disk. The IRAM 30 m telescope was used to detect emission by CN. Observations with ALMA detected carbon monoxide (CO) absorption against the background CO emission from the nebulae of the Rho Ophiuchi complex. ALMA did detect CS in the disk. This study also detected emission by CO, with the CO absorption contained within the mid-plane. A re-analysis of archived ALMA data found that CO, CS and CN decrease in the mid-plane. ^{12}CO does map the low-density disk surface and CN and CS trace the intermediate layers and closer to the star also the mid-plane. The researchers find that CN is produced by ultraviolet and X-ray photons coming from the star, explaining its distribution within the disk.

== See also ==
- List of resolved circumstellar disks
- HH 30, prototype of an edge-on disk
- Proplyd 114-426, another edge-on protoplanetary disk with CO absorption

== Gallery ==
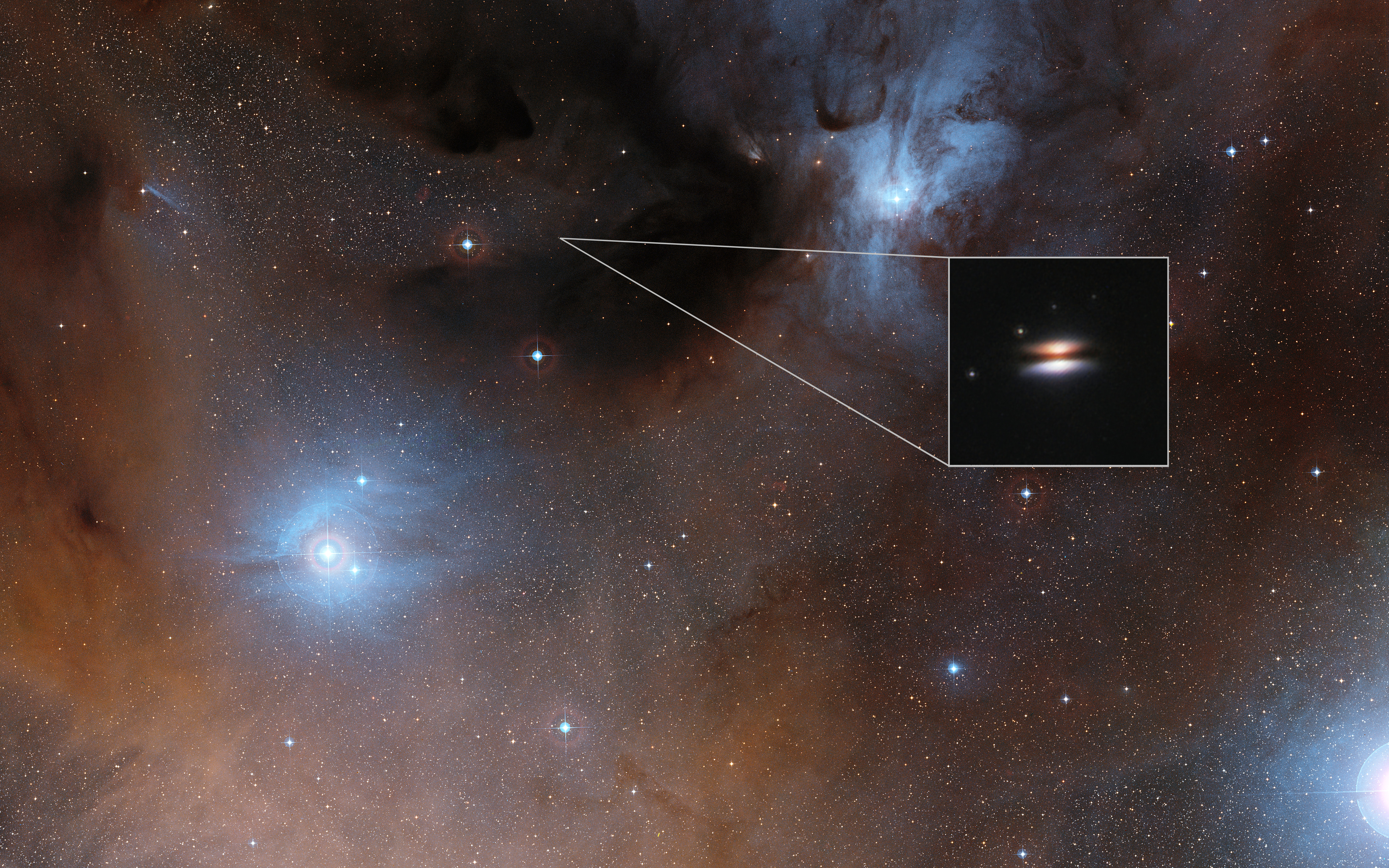
Hubble image of the Flying Saucer inside the Rho Ophiuchi complex (DSS2)

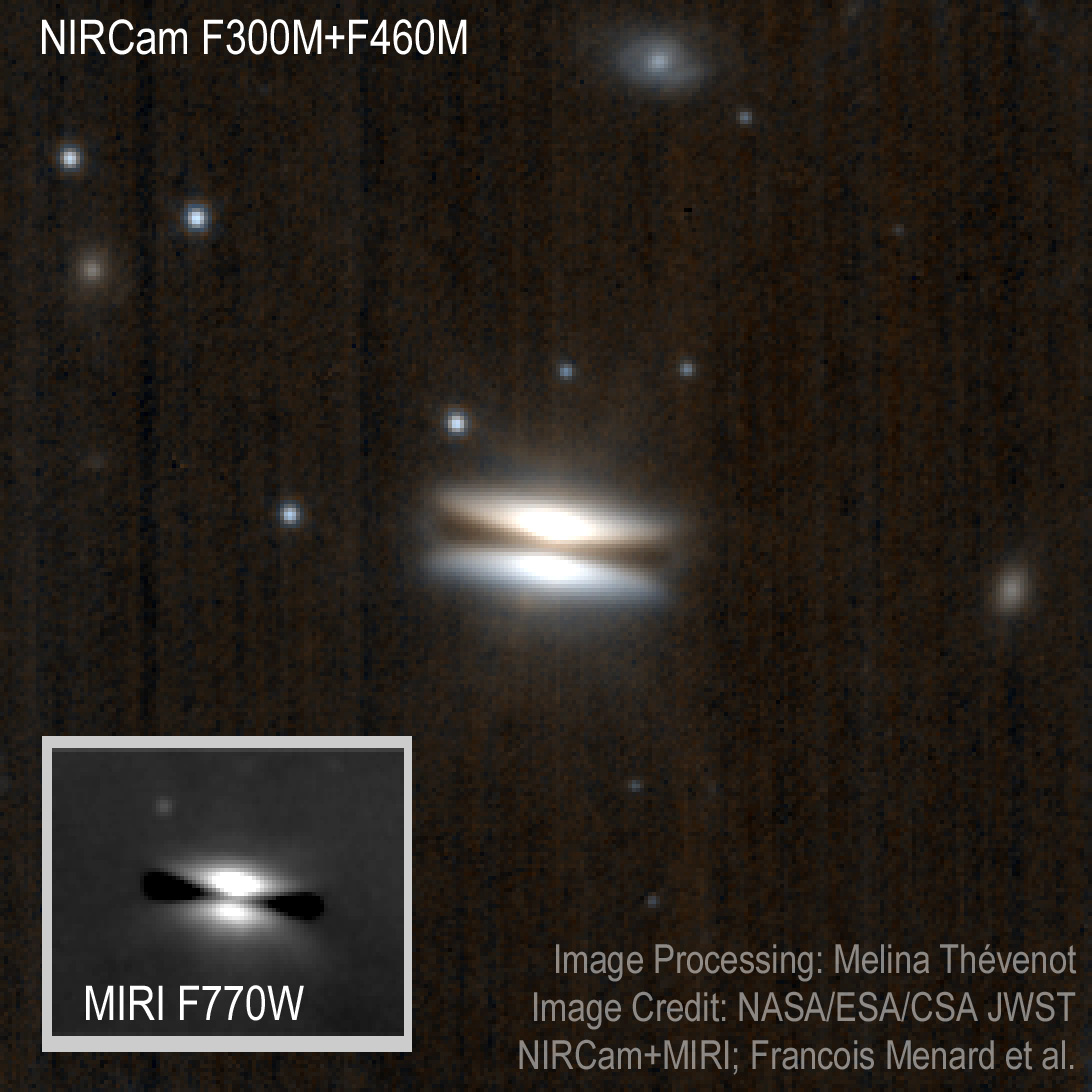
Longer wavelength images of the Flying Saucer. The image on the lower left shows the disk in silhouette against emission by PAHs and H_{2}
