= Proplyd 114-426 =

Protoplanetary disk on Orion

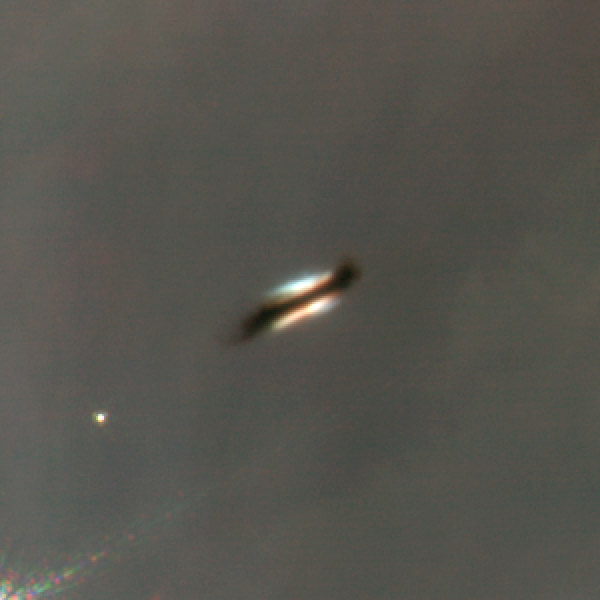
- JWST image of proplyd 114-426; Credit: NASA/ESA/CSA JWST; Mark McCaughrean et al. & Meli_thev

Observation data Epoch J2000 Equinox J2000
- Constellation: Orion
- Right ascension: 05^{h} 35^{m} 11.320^{s}
- Declination: −05° 24′ 26.54″

Characteristics
- Evolutionary stage: young star
- Spectral type: M0

Astrometry
Radial velocity (R_{v})	5 km/s
Distance	1272 ly (390 pc)

Details
Mass	0.4-1 M_{☉}
Luminosity	0.085 L_{☉}
Temperature	3750 K
Age	1 Myr

Other designations
- COUP 419, COUP J053511.3-052426, MLLA 194, [OW94] 114-426, [BSD98] 43, [HC2000] 127, [LML2004] 77, [SEM2016] 132

Database references
SIMBAD	data

Proplyd 114-426 is a large protoplanetary disk seen in absorption in front of the emission of the Orion Nebula. It is one of the largest protoplanetary disks in the Orion Nebula with a diameter of 950 AU.

== Discovery ==
Proplyd 114-426 was discovered in 1996 by Mark McCaughrean and Robert O'Dell with images of the Hubble Space Telescope. The central star was hidden behind the edge-on disk, but the disk showed emission nebulae above and below the center with the filter F547M. These nebulae are present because light from the central star is scattered by the dust of the disk. The disk was published together with other so-called proplyds.

== Central star ==
While the central star is not seen directly, the scattered light can be used to study the central star. An infrared spectrum was published in 2004, showing that the central star had a spectral type of M0 and intermediate gravity. A mass of 0.58 M_{☉} and a temperature of 3750 Kelvin were estimated. The rotation of the disk helped to constrain the mass of the central star to below 1 M_{☉} and a likely mass of 0.4 M_{☉}.

== Disk ==
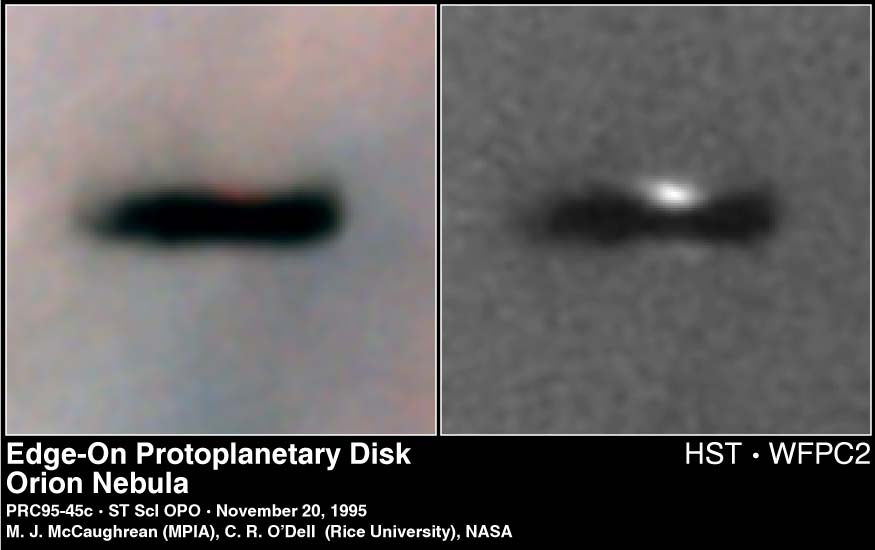
Hubble discovery images of Proplyd 114-426

The disk is one of the largest in the Orion Nebula. Initially the diameter was measured to be 2.3 arcseconds or 1012 AU. The dust mass of the disk was estimated to be 2.9 × 10^{28} grams (4.6 M_{🜨}) and the total (gas+dust) mass was estimated to be 4.34 × 10^{30} g (2.29 M_{J}). Additional Hubble observations showed that the disk is tilted, warped and experiences external photoevaporation. This photoevaporation is caused by diffuse radiation. According to this study the disk should dissipate in a few tens of thousands of years. This study also found that the disk is surrounded by a large "foot-like" structure seen in H-alpha. This "foot-like" structure could however belong to the Herbig-Haro object HH 530, which is located just north of proplyd 114–426. The disk was imaged with ALMA and the disk mass was estimated to be 3.38 ±0.56 M_{J}. The disk is quite faint at longer wavelengths despite being a large disk. This is explained by the disk being an evolved disk with large particles of solids and ices. The disk is seen in dust continuum emission and absorption in the carbon monoxide band. The disk size was updated to be around 950 AU from Hubble images. The dust emission from ALMA is however confined to the inner region within about 350 AU. JWST NIRCam observed the central part of the Orion Nebula, including proplyd 114–426. This observation found a dip at 3 μm, which is seen as evidence of water ice. The grain size was estimated to be smaller than 0.25 to 5 μm and the dust+ice mass of the disk was estimated to be 0.46 M_{🜨} in the silhouette region. The dust mass was previously estimated to be 9.9 M_{🜨} in the scattered light region from ALMA observations. This indicates that while the silhouette is large, it contains a small fraction of mass, due to a small grain size. Absorption of the Paschen-alpha line might also be present, indicating excited hydrogen in the disk. The hydrogen could be excited by the central star or by an external source of ultraviolet light. The morphology from NIRCam images also support a tilted inner disk.

Estimates of disk masses
dust mass (M_{🜨})	gas mass (M_{J})	total mass (M_{J})	Reference
4.6		2.29	
		3.38 ±0.56	
9.9	3.1 ±0.6		
0.46 (silhouette)			

== See also ==
- List of resolved circumstellar disks

Other edge-on disks

- Gomez's Hamburger
- Dracula's Chivito
- HK Tauri B
