= González Gómez =

González Gómez may refer to:

- Cecilia González Gómez (1961–2017), Mexican politician
- Francisco González Gómez (1918–1990), Spanish caricaturist, painter and sculptor
- Javier González Gómez a.k.a. Javi (born 1974), Spanish retired footballer

== See also ==
- Gómez González (disambiguation)
