= FS Tauri =

Variable star in the constellation Taurus

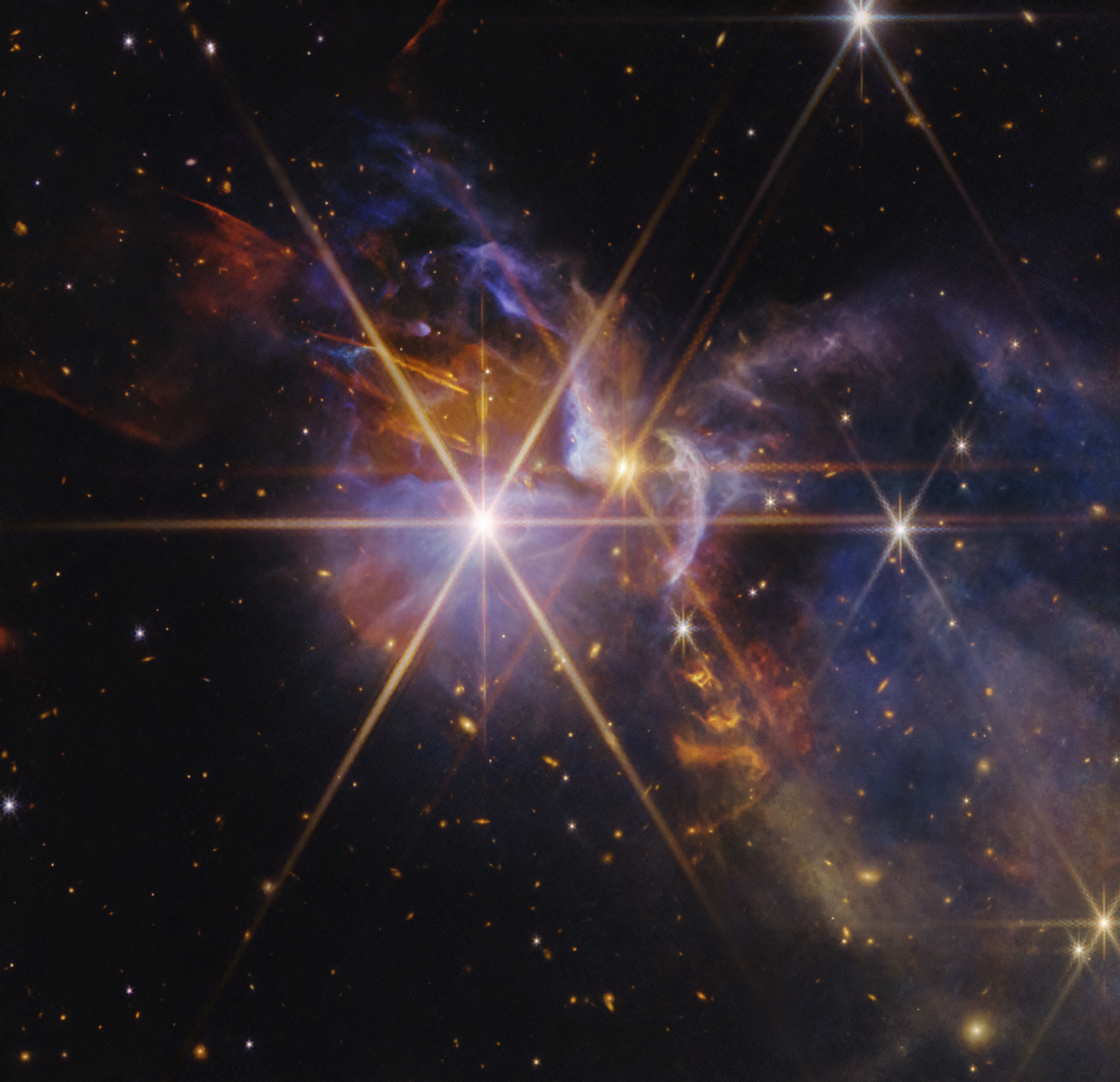
- FS Tauri imaged by James Webb's NIRCam instrument

Observation data Epoch J2000 Equinox ICRS
- Constellation: Taurus
- Right ascension: 04^{h} 22^{m} 01.76^{s}
- Declination: +26° 57′ 28.9″
- Apparent magnitude (V): 14.10

Characteristics
- Evolutionary stage: Pre main-sequence
- Spectral type: M3.5e + M0e
- Variable type: Orion

Astrometry
Radial velocity (R_{v})	18.940599 km/s
Proper motion (μ)	RA: 30.7±7 mas/yr Dec.: −39±6.9 mas/yr
Parallax (π)	7.4695 mas
Distance	450 ly

Details

A
Mass	0.64 M_{☉}
Radius	1.29 R_{☉}
Luminosity	0.32 L_{☉}
Surface gravity (log g)	3.87 cgs
Temperature	3,841 K
Metallicity [Fe/H]	−0.57 dex
Age	468,000 years

B
Mass	0.33 M_{☉}
Luminosity	0.16 L_{☉}
Temperature	3,340 K
Age	2.5 Myr

Other designations
- HH 157, FS Tau, TIC 5843743, IRAS 04189+2650(E), 2MASS J04220217+2657304, WISE J042202.17+265730.4, Gaia DR3 152292187332155008
- B: FS Tau B, IRAS 04189+2650(W), SDSS J042201.05+265735.4

Database references
SIMBAD	A
- B

FS Tauri (FS Tau) is a young multiple star system located within the Taurus molecular cloud complex approximately 450 light-years away in the constellation of Taurus. FS Tauri is known for its young age of 2.8 million years and for its prominent bipolar outflow.

== Characteristics ==
FS Tauri is a binary star system consisting of two pre-main-sequence stars. The object was catalogued in 1997 during the study of T Tauri stars in star-forming regions. It appeared as Haro 6-5 and HH157 in Haro and Herbig-Haro Catalog. The system has been studied by Hubble Space Telescope in 1998 and it was discovered that FS Tauri A has a temperature of 3,360 K.

== FS Tauri B ==
In 1996 FS Tauri was imaged with WFPC2, revealing that the source of the jet is FS Tauri B. The source of the jet is not directly visible, but instead is two nebula, which is an edge-on disk, similar to HH 30. Observations with NACO on the VLT showed that inside the disk substantial dust grain growth has taken place and that grains did grow to a size of 1mm or larger. Observations with JWST NIRSpec did show that the brightness of the disk wind and jet is asymmetric and more brighter on the side of the blueshifted jet. The disk is inclined by around 70°.

== Gallery ==
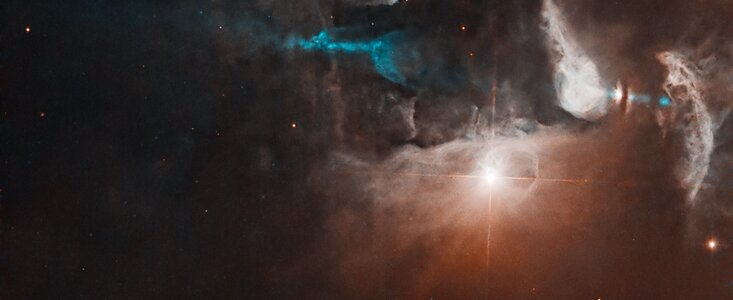
FS Tauri imaged by Hubble Space Telescope

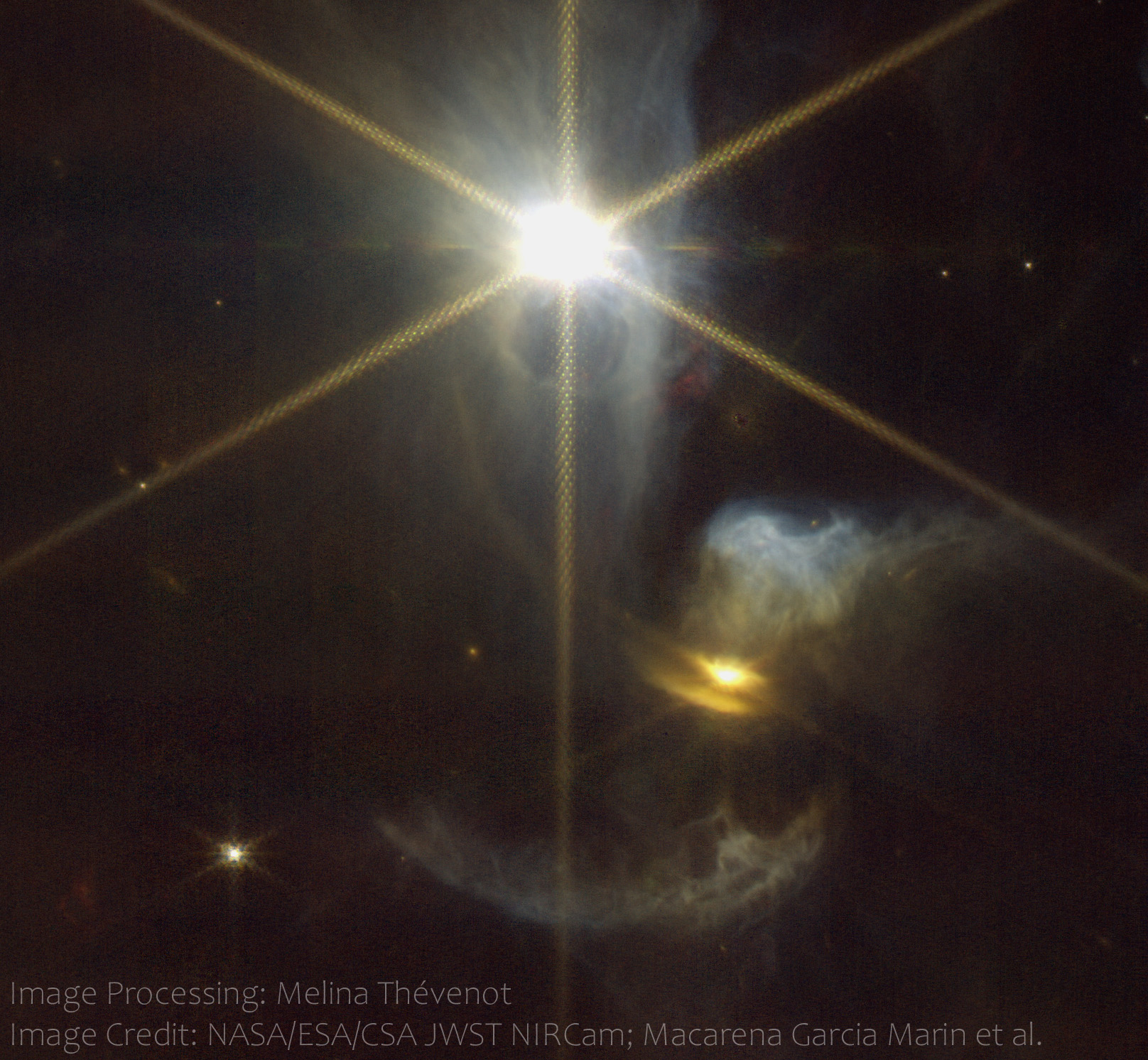
The edge-on disk of FS Tauri B (yellow color) on the lower right. The bright star is FS Tauri A.

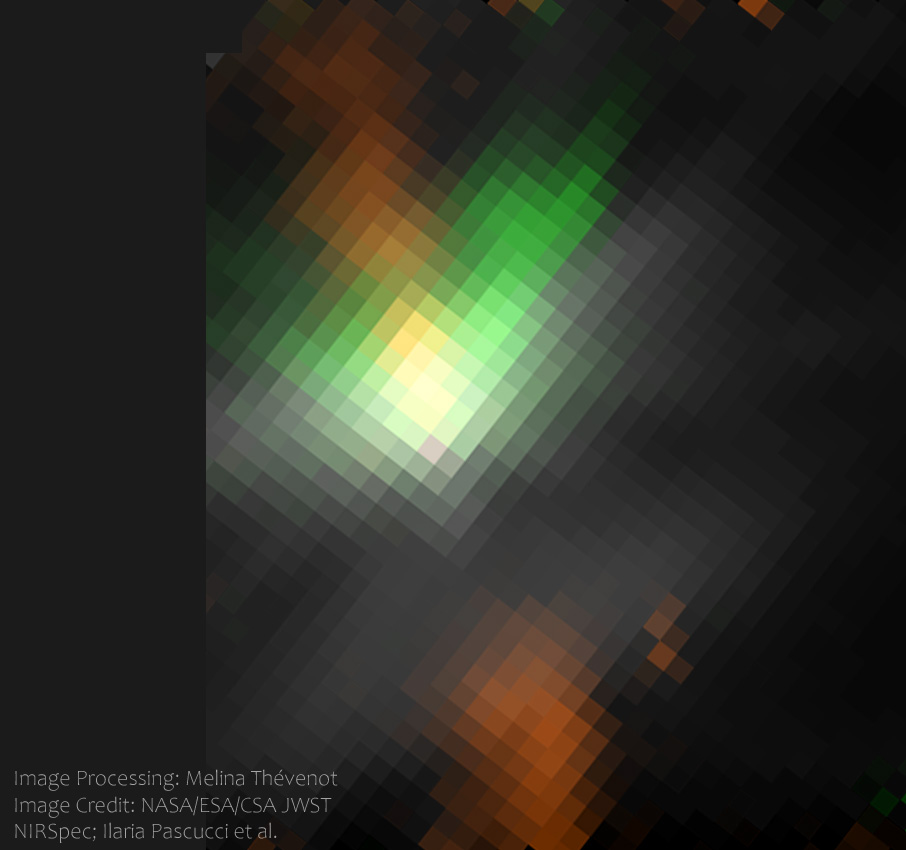
FS Tauri B with NIRSpec, showing the disk in gray, the jet (iron) in orange and the disk wind (molecular hydrogen) in green.
