= Gómez Suárez de Figueroa =

Gómez Suárez de Figueroa may refer to:

- Gómez Suárez de Figueroa, also known as Garcilaso de la Vega, 16th-century historian
- Gomez Suarez de Figueroa of Cordova, 1st Duke of Feria, Spanish nobleman in the reign of Philip II
- Gómez Suárez de Figueroa, 3rd Duke of Feria (1587–1634), Spanish nobleman and soldier
