= Oph-IRS 48 =

Star surrounded by protoplanetary disk

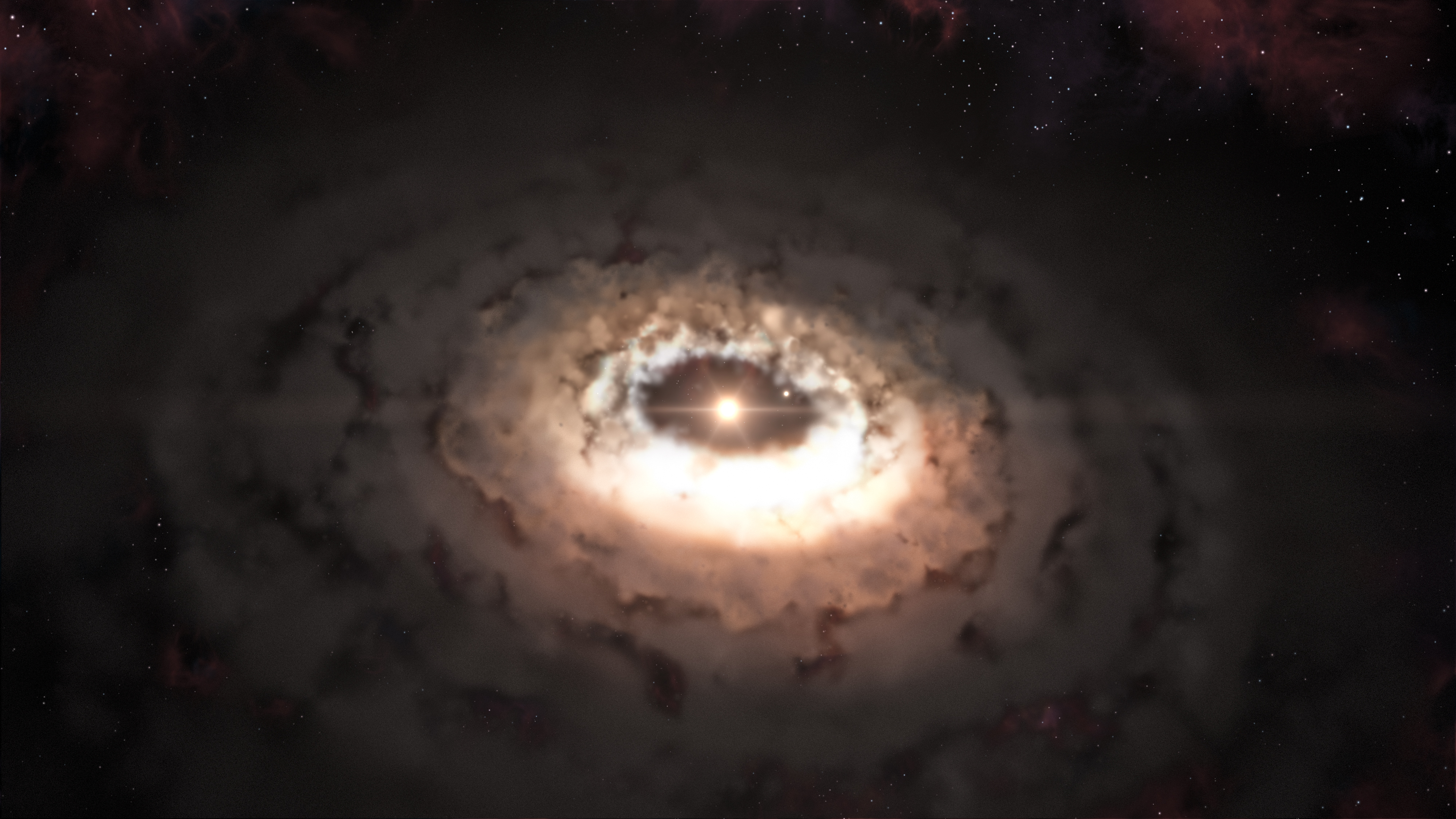
- Artist's impression of Oph-IRS 48's dust disk

Observation data Epoch J2000 Equinox J2000
- Constellation: Ophiuchus
- Right ascension: 16^{h} 27^{m} 37.18^{s}
- Declination: −24° 30′ 35.3″
- Apparent magnitude (V): 14.80

Characteristics
- Spectral type: B5-F2

Astrometry
Proper motion (μ)	RA: −9.190 mas/yr Dec.: −23.995 mas/yr
Parallax (π)	7.4375±0.1157 mas
Distance	439 ± 7 ly (134 ± 2 pc)

Details
Mass	2 M_{☉}
Luminosity	14.3 L_{☉}

Other designations
- IRAS 16245-2423, 2MASS J16273718-2430350 Gaia DR2 6049145880875631744

Database references
SIMBAD	data

Oph-IRS 48, nicknamed the Cosmic Croissant for its unique shape, is a star surrounded by a protoplanetary disk, about 444 light-years from Earth in the constellation of Ophiuchus. The disk has changed the view of planet formation in astronomy. Studies have shown that the millimeter dust particles are gathered in a crescent shape, while the gas (traced by CO molecules) and small dust grains follow a full disk ring structure. The centimeter grains are even more concentrated inside the crescent. This structure is consistent with theoretical predictions of dust trapping. Also the chemical composition has been studied, with molecules like H_{2}CO being present. The dust trap is thought to be conducting the process of planet formation in this young system.
