= GM Aurigae =

T Tauri star in the Auriga constellation

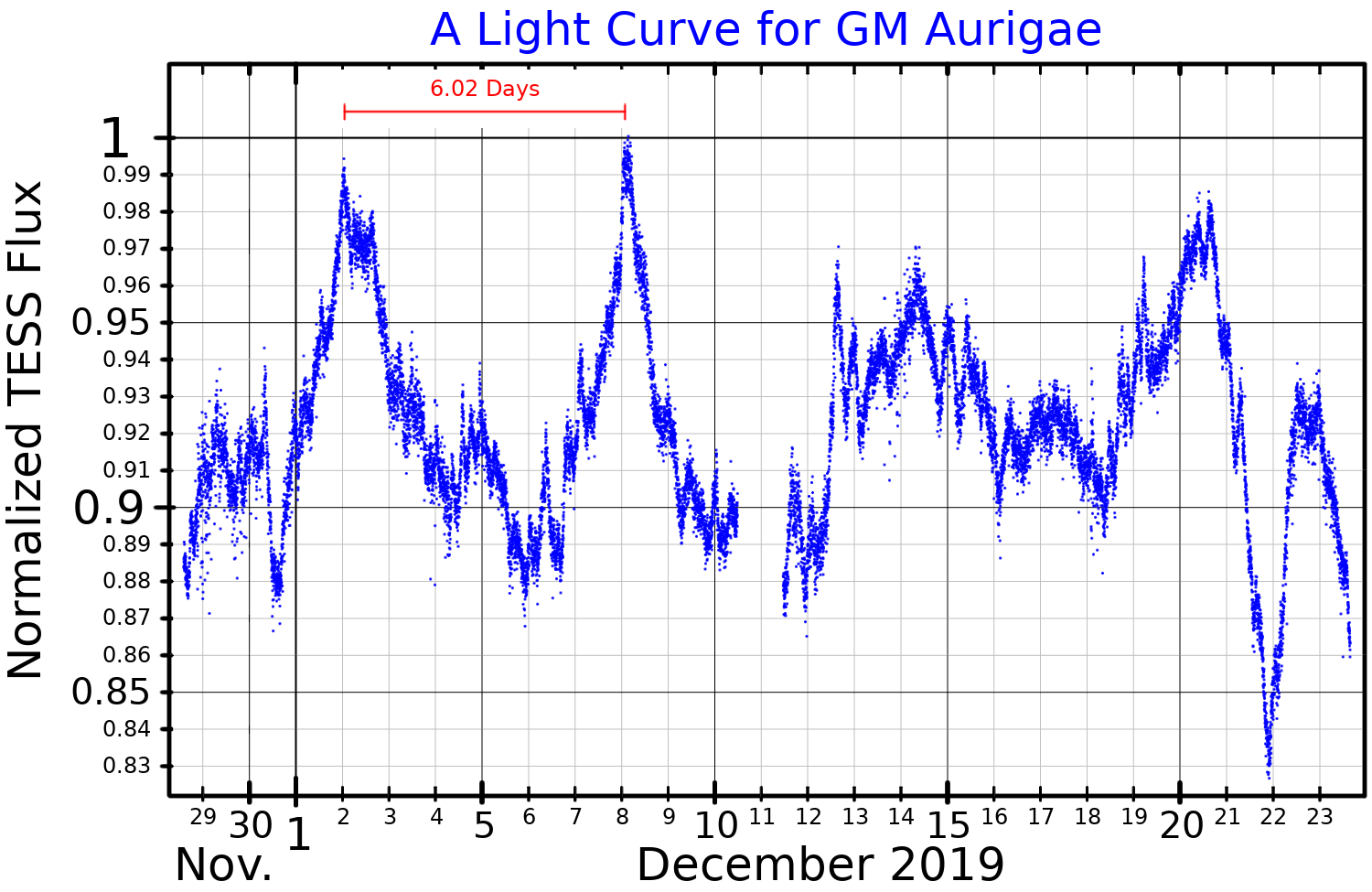
- A light curve for GM Aurigae, plotted from TESS data. The 6.02 day period is marked in red.

Observation data Epoch J2000 Equinox ICRS
- Constellation: Auriga
- Right ascension: 04^{h} 55^{m} 10.9816^{s}
- Declination: +30° 21′ 59.374″
- Apparent magnitude (V): 12.24

Characteristics
- Evolutionary stage: T Tauri star
- Spectral type: K3Ve or K6

Astrometry
Radial velocity (R_{v})	14.9±0.3 km/s
Proper motion (μ)	RA: +3.748 mas/yr Dec.: −24.298 mas/yr
Parallax (π)	6.3248±0.0490 mas
Distance	516 ± 4 ly (158 ± 1 pc)

Details
Mass	0.95±0.05 M_{☉}
Radius	2.02±0.06 R_{☉}
Luminosity	1.25±0.08 L_{☉}
Surface gravity (log g)	3.80±0.03 cgs
Temperature	4287±35 K
Rotation	~6 days
Rotational velocity (v sin i)	13.5±0.2 km/s
Age	~1.5 Myr

Other designations
- GM Aur, AAVSO 0448+30, TIC 96533063, GCRV 55585, IRAS 04519+3017, 2MASS J04551098+3021595, WISE J045510.97+302159.2, WISEA J045510.97+302159.1, 2E 1172, AKARI-IRC-V1 J0455110+302159, AP J04551098+3021595, CSI+30-04520 2, GEN# +6.20078077, HBC 77, HBHA 2713-04, MHA 259-1, PSCz P04519+3017, SVS 1089, UCAC4 602-015297

Database references
SIMBAD	data

GM Aurigae (GM Aur) is a K6V-type T Tauri star located 155 parsecs from Earth in the constellation of Auriga. It has a mass of 0.95 solar masses, a radius of 2 solar radii, a luminosity of 1.2 solar luminosity and a temperature of 4287 Kelvin. It has an age of around 3-10 million years and is a member of the Taurus-Auriga star forming region. The star is host to a circumstellar disk with a possible planet still forming within it.

It has a stellar rotation period between 5.18 and 6.1 days, with a rotational period of approximately 6.04 days being most likely.

== Circumstellar disk ==
GM Aur is host to an extensively studied circumstellar disk. Within this disk it has a large dust cavity located at 35 AU. There is a fainter disk extending up to 250 AU. There is no consensus on whether this cavity was carved out by a forming exoplanet accreting material, photoevaporation, magnetohydrodynamic disk winds or a combination of all of the above. If there were a planet forming in the system, it would likely have a minimum mass of about 1.10 Jupiter masses. Spatially resolved submillimetre observations of GM Aur confirm the existence of a transitional disc that is inclined at 52.77° with respect to the line of sight. This disk also has an inner dust cavity with a radius of 30-40 AU.

Spectra taken of the stars circumstellar disk show that H2 dominated the spectrum. Other than H2, OH lines have been detected within the disk of GM Aur along with CO emissions. Methyl cations (CH3) and bicarbonate (HCO) have also been found within the disk along with tentative signals of carbon dioxide. Water (H2O) has also been detected, but is photo-destroyed at a rate of around $5.4 \times 10^{40}$ molecules of water destroyed every second. This rate of destruction is less volatile than other stars.

The GM Aurigae planetary system (Note: The circumstellar disk has an inclination of 52.77°±0.05° to the plane of the sky. If the planet shares that inclination, its true mass would be 1.38±0.37 M_{J}.)
Companion (in order from star)	Mass	Semimajor axis (AU)	Orbital period (days)	Eccentricity	Inclination (°)	Radius
b (unconfirmed)	≥1.10±0.30 M_{J}	0.082±0.002	8.745±0.009	—	—	—

== Magnetic field ==
The large-scale magnetic field of GM Aur has a dipolar configuration with a slight tilt. It has a strength of 730 gauss which is similar to other classical T Tauri stars with similar rotational periods.
