= V1094 Scorpii =

Variable star

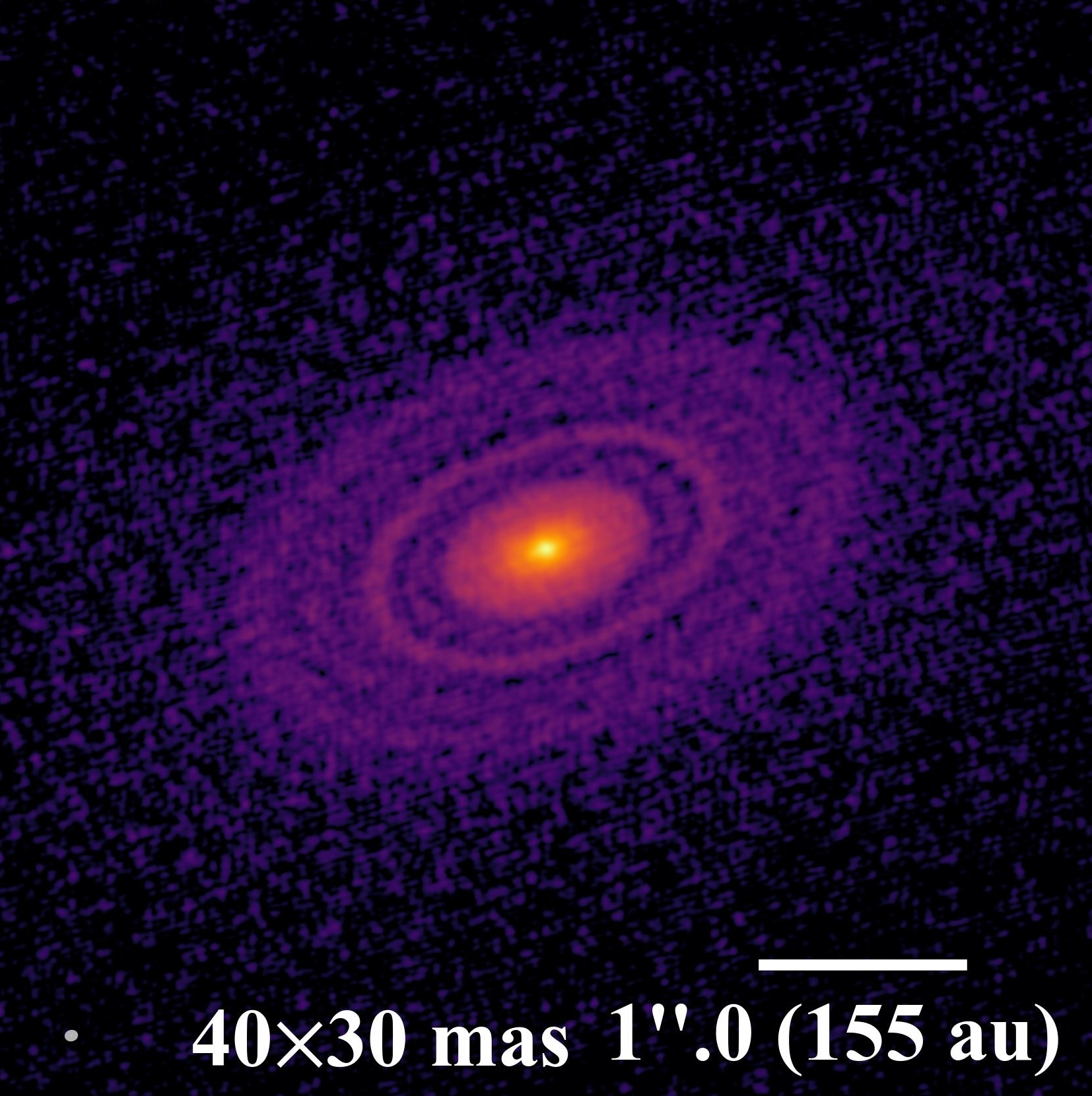
- ALMA Band 6 (1.3 mm) dust continuum image of the V1094 Scorpii disk, showing multiple dust rings and gaps (Yamaguchi et al. 2026).

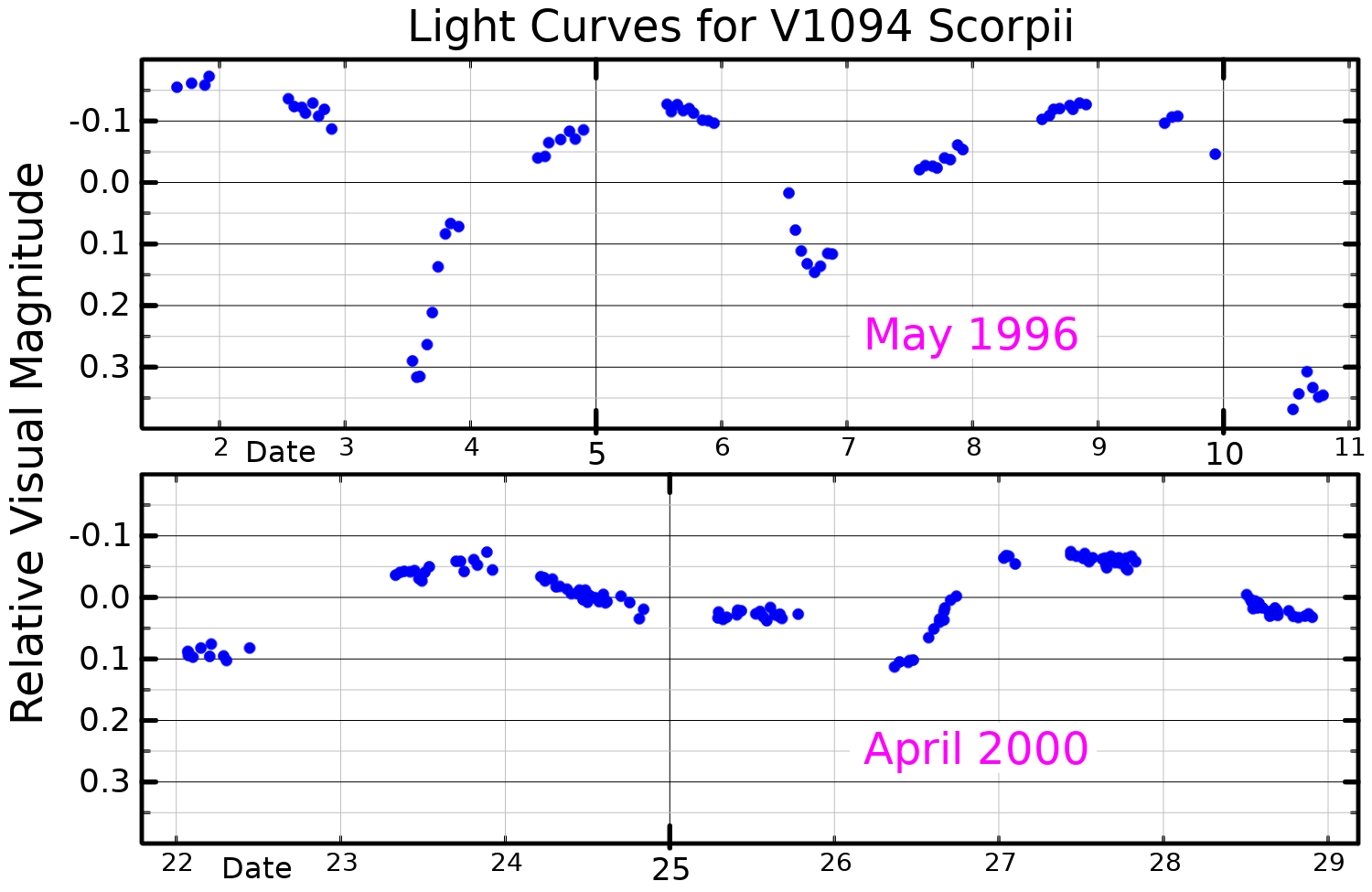
- Visual band light curves for V1094 Scorpii, adapted from Wichmann et al. (1998) and Joergens et al. (2001)

Observation data Epoch J2000.0 Equinox ICRS
- Constellation: Lupus
- Right ascension: 16^{h} 08^{m} 36.17701^{s}
- Declination: −39° 23′ 02.4621″
- Apparent magnitude (V): 13.48

Characteristics
- Spectral type: K6V
- Variable type: T Tauri-type

Astrometry
Proper motion (μ)	RA: −9.830 mas/yr Dec.: +23.435 mas/yr
Parallax (π)	6.5086±0.0452 mas
Distance	501 ± 3 ly (154 ± 1 pc)

Details
Mass	0.88 M_{☉}
Radius	1.6 R_{☉}
Luminosity	0.64 L_{☉}
Temperature	4,116 K
Age	2.4 Myr

Other designations
- V1094 Sco, GSC 07855-01162, 2MASS J16083617-3923024

Database references
SIMBAD	data

V1094 Scorpii is a young stellar object in the constellation of Scorpius, located in the young Lupus Star Forming Region. It is being orbited by a protoplanetary disk that extends out to a distance of 300 AU from the host star. There are gaps at 100 AU and 170 AU, with bright rings at 130 AU and 220 AU.

A 2026 study analyzed ALMA Band 6 (1.3 mm) continuum and CO line data together with a VLT/SPHERE near-infrared scattered-light image, using 2D super-resolution imaging to resolve the disk at higher angular resolution. It found four narrow dust ring–gap pairs, with the dust continuum extending to about 380 AU and the CO gas disk extending to roughly 760 AU in Keplerian rotation, placing V1094 Sco among the largest known Class II disks. The same work derived a dynamical stellar mass of about 0.88 M_{☉} and inferred weak turbulence in the outer disk. The authors interpreted the substructure as having a hybrid origin: a low-mass companion of about 55 Earth masses near 100 AU driving the inner double gap, and secular gravitational instability producing the outer rings at 170–230 AU.

In 1998, Rainer Wichmann et al. announced that the star, then known as RXJ1608.6-3922, is a variable star, based on visual band photometry over a nine day interval. They classified it as an eclipsing binary. Later observations showed that the brightness variations are due to starspots. It was given its variable star designation in the year 2000.

Periodic radial velocity variations in the young star V1094 Scorpii had at first been explained by the presence of a substellar object in a tight orbit. Currently, the presence of a substellar object has been retracted; again starspots have been invoked as the actual cause for observed radial velocity variations.
