= Elias 2-27 =

Star with a protoplanetary disk around it

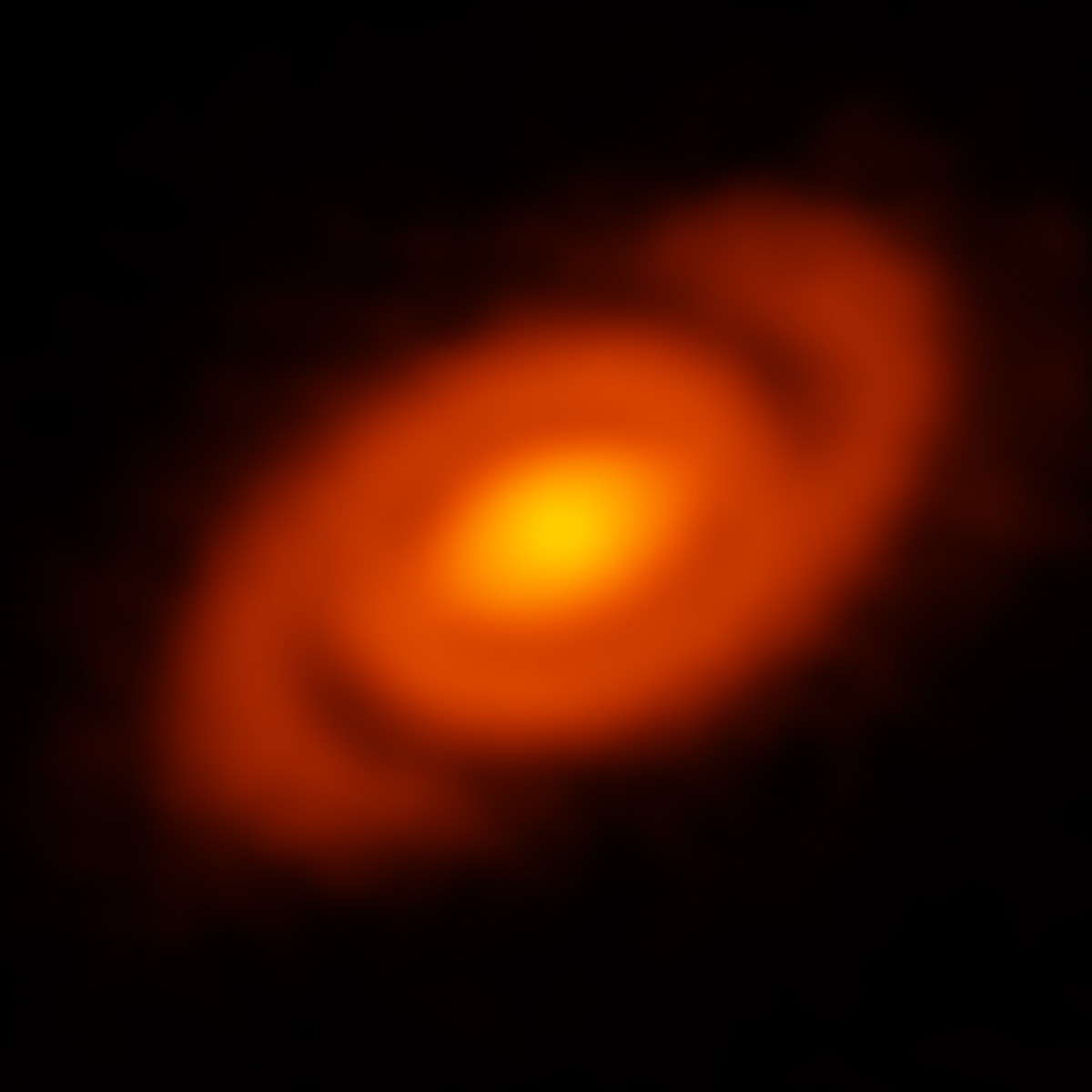
- Protoplanetary disk surrounding the young star Elias 2-27, located some 360 light years away

Observation data Epoch J2000.0 Equinox ICRS
- Constellation: Ophiuchus
- Right ascension: 16^{h} 26^{m} 45.032^{s}
- Declination: −24° 23′ 07.79″
- Apparent magnitude (V): 13.32

Characteristics
- Evolutionary stage: Pre-main-sequence star
- Spectral type: M0

Astrometry
Proper motion (μ)	RA: −7.954 mas/yr Dec.: −28.295 mas/yr
Parallax (π)	9.0853±0.8505 mas
Distance	360 ± 30 ly (110 ± 10 pc)

Details
Mass	0.46^{+0.02}_{−0.03} M_{☉}
Radius	2.3 R_{☉}
Temperature	3850 K
Age	0.8 Myr

Other designations
- 2MASS J16264502-2423077, Gaia DR2 6049161819498750208

Database references
SIMBAD	data

Elias 2-27 (2MASS J16264502-2423077) is a YSO star with a protoplanetary disk around it, located in the Ophiuchus Molecular Cloud (ρ Oph Cld, 5 Oph Cld, Ophiuchus Dark Cloud), a star-forming region in the constellation Ophiuchus, some 360 light-years (110 parsecs) away. This star system became the first ever observed with density waves in the disk, giving it a spiral structure. Elias 2-27 is located near the double star Rho Ophiuchi (5 Ophiuchi).

== Disk ==
In 2016, it was discovered that disk perturbations from density waves organized the disk debris into a pinwheel structure, with sweeping spiral arms; using observations from the Atacama Large Millimeter Array (ALMA) radio telescope. This marks the first instance of such an observation in a protoplanetary disk, though they have been previously predicted. The spiral arms start at 100 AU (9.3×10^{9} mi; 1.5×10^{10} km) and extend out to 300 AU (2.8×10^{10} mi; 4.5×10^{10} km). The disk has a 14 AU wide gap at 69 AU radius with a reduced amount of dust. The disk is very massive at 0.08±0.04M_{☉}.

The planetary system
Companion (in order from star)	Mass	Semimajor axis (AU)	Orbital period (days)	Eccentricity	Inclination (°)	Radius
protoplanetary disk	5–300 AU				56.2±0.8°	—
