= Gómez González (disambiguation) =

Gómez González (died 1111) was a Spanish count and military leader.

Gómez González may also refer to:

- Gómez González de Traba (fl. 1164–1209), Galician nobleman
- Gómez González de Manzanedo (died 1182), Castilian magnate
- Adrián Gómez González, Mexican drug trafficker
- Arely Gómez González (born 1952), Mexican politician
- José Higinio Gómez González (1932–2008), Spanish Roman Catholic bishop
- Juanito (footballer, born 1954) (Juan Gómez González, 1954–1992), Spanish footballer
- Julio Gómez González (born 1994), Mexican footballer
- Servando Ruiz-Gómez y González-Llanos (1821–1888), Spanish politician, lawyer and journalist

== See also ==
- González Gómez (disambiguation)
