= CQ Tauri =

Star in the constellation Taurus

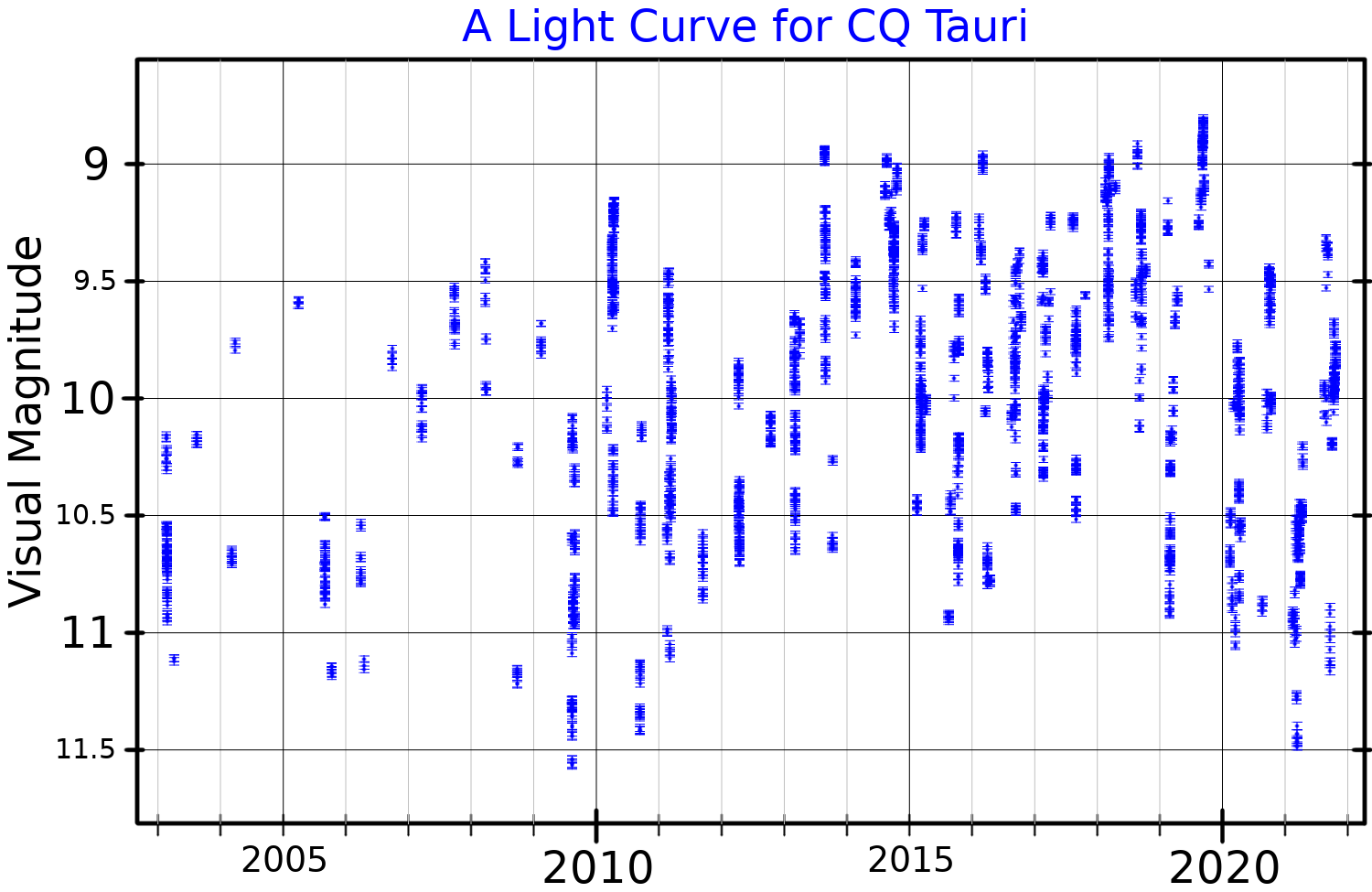
- A visual band light curve for CQ Tauri, plotted from INTEGRAL OMC data

Observation data Epoch J2000.0 Equinox ICRS
- Constellation: Taurus
- Right ascension: 05^{h} 35^{m} 58.467^{s}
- Declination: 24° 44′ 54.09″
- Apparent magnitude (V): 10.48 (8.7 to 12.25)

Characteristics
- Evolutionary stage: Pre-main-sequence
- Spectral type: F5IVe
- B−V color index: 0.696±0.091
- Variable type: Orion variable

Astrometry
Radial velocity (R_{v})	22.60±2.7 km/s
Proper motion (μ)	RA: 2.987 mas/yr Dec.: −26.364 mas/yr
Parallax (π)	6.6946±0.0600 mas
Distance	487 ± 4 ly (149 ± 1 pc)
Absolute magnitude (M_{V})	5.92

Details
Mass	1.67 M_{☉}
Radius	1.7 R_{☉}
Luminosity	10 L_{☉}
Surface gravity (log g)	4.0 cgs
Temperature	6,900 K
Metallicity [Fe/H]	+0.14 dex
Rotational velocity (v sin i)	105.0±5.0 km/s
Age	10 Myr

Other designations
- CQ Tau, BD+24°873, HD 36910, HIP 26295, SAO 77299, PPM 94541

Database references
SIMBAD	data

CQ Tauri is a young variable star in the equatorial constellation of Taurus. It is too faint to be visible to the naked eye with an apparent visual magnitude that ranges from 8.7 to 12.25. The distance to this star is approximately 487 light years based on parallax measurements, and it is drifting further away with a radial velocity of ~23 km/s. It appears to be part of the T-association Tau 4. CQ Tauri lies close enough to the ecliptic to undergo lunar occultations.

This star was independently reported as a variable by Artjukinov (sp?) in 1948 and C. Hoffmeister in 1949. Hoffmeister classified it as a member of the RW Aurigae-like variables with a brightness that ranged from an apparent visual magnitude of 8.7 down to 10.5, making it one of the brightest members of that type. G. H. Herbig in 1960 found a spectral class of F2 for this star, and by 1973 it was classed as an Orion variable of the T Tauri type. In 1968, W. Götz and W. Wenzel discovered a faint emission of blue light coming from the system.

Spectral images of the system in 1973 showed double emission lines on an F-type star. It was found to be an infrared source by IRAS and associated with nebulosity, which allowed it to be cataloged as a Herbig Ae/Be star in 1994 by P. S. Thé and associates. The star undergoes irregular brightness decreases that are otherwise similar to an Algol-like variation. It is being orbited by an inhomogeneous accretion disk, which is the source for the emission lines.

CQ Tauri is a pre-main-sequence star with a stellar classification of F5IVe. It has 1.67 times the mass of the Sun and is radiating 10 times the Sun's luminosity with an effective temperature of 6,900 K. The star is about 10 million years old and is spinning with a projected rotational velocity of 105 km/s. Simulations intended to reproduce the distribution of the circumstellar disk suggest an embedded planet with a mass of 6–9 M_{J} is orbiting the star at a distance of ~20 AU. Near infrared observations in 2018 show a spiral structure in the disk that is consistent with the presence of an orbiting planet. However, no planet was detected.

== Protoplanetary system ==
Observations with the Very Large Array during 2000 demonstrated the extent of the massive protoplanetary disk orbiting the star. The mass of dust in the disk was estimated at 1.5×10^{−4} M_{☉}. Measurements suggest the dust grains in the disk around CQ Tauri have grown to a maximum of about a centimetre in size, with decreasing grain size beyond 40 AU from the host star. Data from the Atacama Large Millimeter Array show a cavity in the inner disk that is depleted of gas and dust. Isolated, thick clouds of dust are randomly obscuring the star.

In 2022, four spiral arms were detected in the protoplanetary disk. An as yet unseen planet on an eccentric and inclined orbit is suspected to be disturbing the shape of the disk.
