= HD 115600 =

Star in the constellation Centaurus

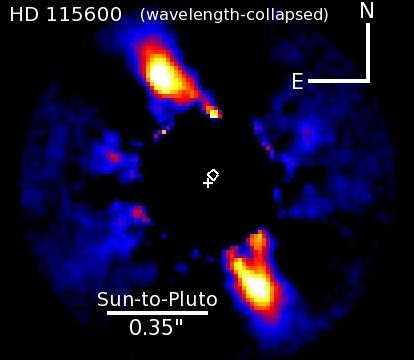
- Image of the HD 115600 debris ring from the Gemini Planet Imager. The disk center (diamond) is slightly offset from the star's position (cross).

Observation data Epoch J2000 Equinox J2000
- Constellation: Centaurus
- Right ascension: 13^{h} 19^{m} 19.54^{s}
- Declination: −59° 28′ 20.4″
- Apparent magnitude (V): 8.22

Characteristics
- Evolutionary stage: main sequence
- Spectral type: F2/F3V
- B−V color index: 0.37

Astrometry
Radial velocity (R_{v})	+12.51±0.18 km/s
Proper motion (μ)	RA: −32.737 mas/yr Dec.: −18.275 mas/yr
Parallax (π)	9.1707±0.0210 mas
Distance	355.7 ± 0.8 ly (109.0 ± 0.2 pc)
Absolute magnitude (M_{V})	3.03

Details
Mass	1.57 M_{☉}
Radius	1.55 R_{☉}
Luminosity	5.47 L_{☉}
Surface gravity (log g)	4.25 cgs
Temperature	7,092 K
Rotational velocity (v sin i)	61 km/s
Age	15 Myr

Other designations
- CD−58°4985, HIP 64995, SAO 240737

Database references
SIMBAD	data

HD 115600 is a star in the constellation Centaurus and a member of the Scorpius–Centaurus association, the nearest OB association to the Sun and the host star of a bright Kuiper belt-like debris ring.

The star has a spectral type of F2/F3V and is about 50% more massive than the Sun and is located 109 parsecs (356 ly) distant from Earth. It is around 15 million years old. Data from the Spitzer Space Telescope revealed a large infrared excess consistent with the presence of a luminous, dusty circumstellar disk.

== Debris ring ==
On May 26, 2015 a team led by Thayne Currie, Carey Lisse, and Marc Kuchner announced the discovery of a scattered light-resolved debris disk likely responsible for the system's strong infrared excess around HD 115600 using the Gemini Planet Imager.

The debris disk is shaped like a ring and has a (luminosity-scaled) semimajor axis of about 48 (22) AU, comparable to the current Kuiper belt. The debris ring appears eccentric. Using models simulating the interaction between massive planets and debris disks, eccentric analogues of the outer solar system planets could explain the disk's eccentricity and ring-like appearance.

The dust making the ring visible appears to be neutral scattering; spectra of the ring ansae reveal a gray to slightly blue color, consistent with major Kuiper belt constituents. The disk likely has a very high albedo, which is expected if it is icy like the Kuiper belt. The disk is the first new object discovered with extreme adaptive optics.
