= HD 114082 =

Star in the constellation Centaurus

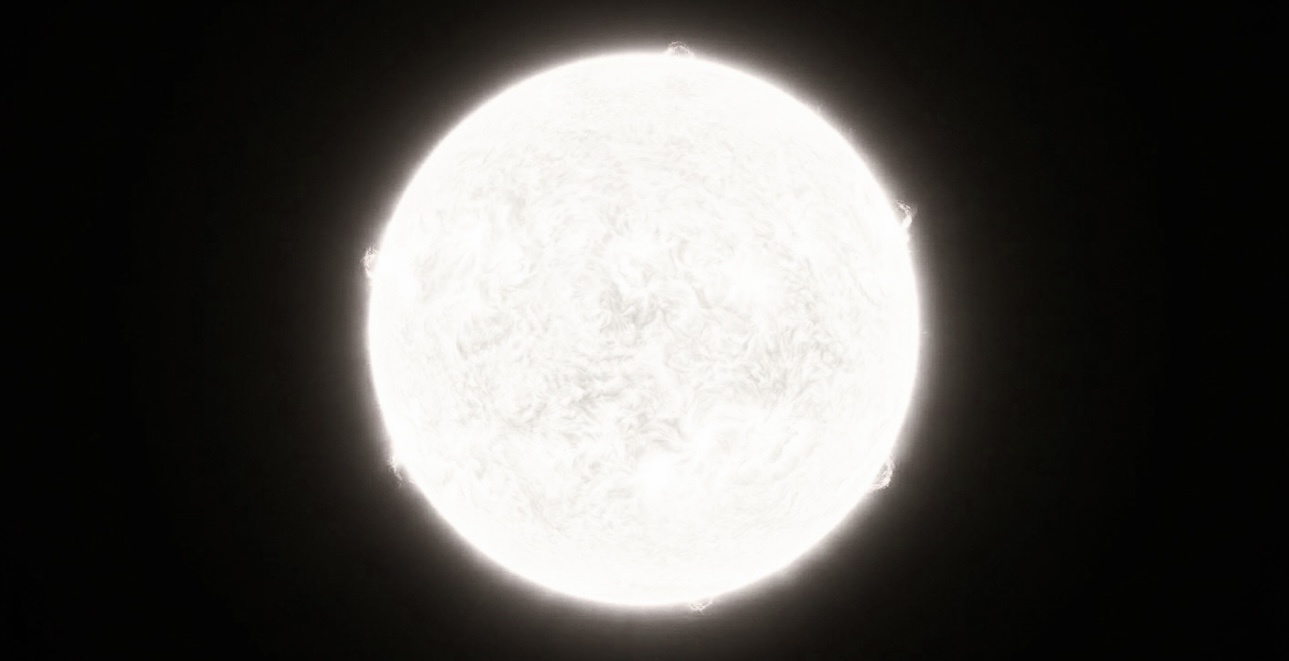
- Artist's impression of HD 114082

Observation data Epoch J2000.0 Equinox ICRS
- Constellation: Centaurus
- Right ascension: 13^{h} 09^{m} 16.193^{s}
- Declination: –60° 18′ 30.056″
- Apparent magnitude (V): 8.21±0.01

Characteristics
- Evolutionary stage: pre-main-sequence
- Spectral type: F3V
- B−V color index: 0.445±0.015
- Variable type: constant

Astrometry
Radial velocity (R_{v})	7.56±0.19 km/s
Proper motion (μ)	RA: −39.769 mas/yr Dec.: −19.961 mas/yr
Parallax (π)	10.5201±0.0223 mas
Distance	310.0 ± 0.7 ly (95.1 ± 0.2 pc)
Absolute magnitude (M_{V})	3.55

Details
Mass	1.28±0.07 M_{☉}
Radius	1.482±0.021 R_{☉}
Luminosity	3.78±0.07 L_{☉}
Surface gravity (log g)	4.20±0.03 cgs
Temperature	6,610±23 K
Metallicity [Fe/H]	0.00±0.03 dex
Rotation	1.85±0.04 d
Rotational velocity (v sin i)	39.2±0.5 km/s
Age	15±3 Myr

Other designations
- CD−59°4588, HD 114082, HIP 64184, SAO 252171, PPM 359905

Database references
SIMBAD	data
Exoplanet Archive	data

HD 114082 is a young star with a pair of orbiting exoplanetary companions, located in the southern constellation of Centaurus. With an apparent visual magnitude of 8.20, the star is too faint to be visible to the naked eye. Based on a parallax shift of 10.52 mas, it is located at a distance of 310.0 ly (95.0 pc). It is a member of the Lower Centaurus-Crux association of co-moving stars.

== Properties ==
The star has a stellar classification of F3V, thus presenting as an F-type main-sequence star. However, it is a young star that is still contracting toward the main sequence. Presently, it is located in the instability strip of the H-R diagram near the range where Delta Scuti variables are found, but it exhibits no such pulsational behavior. It is spinning rapidly, with a projected rotational velocity of 39 km/s.

HD 114082 has 1.3 times the mass and 1.5 radius of the Sun. It is around 15 million years old and is radiating 3.8 times the luminosity of the Sun from its photosphere at an effective temperature of 6,610 K. Based on the amount of iron appearing in its spectrum, the abundance of elements more massive than helium is similar to that in the Sun.

== System ==
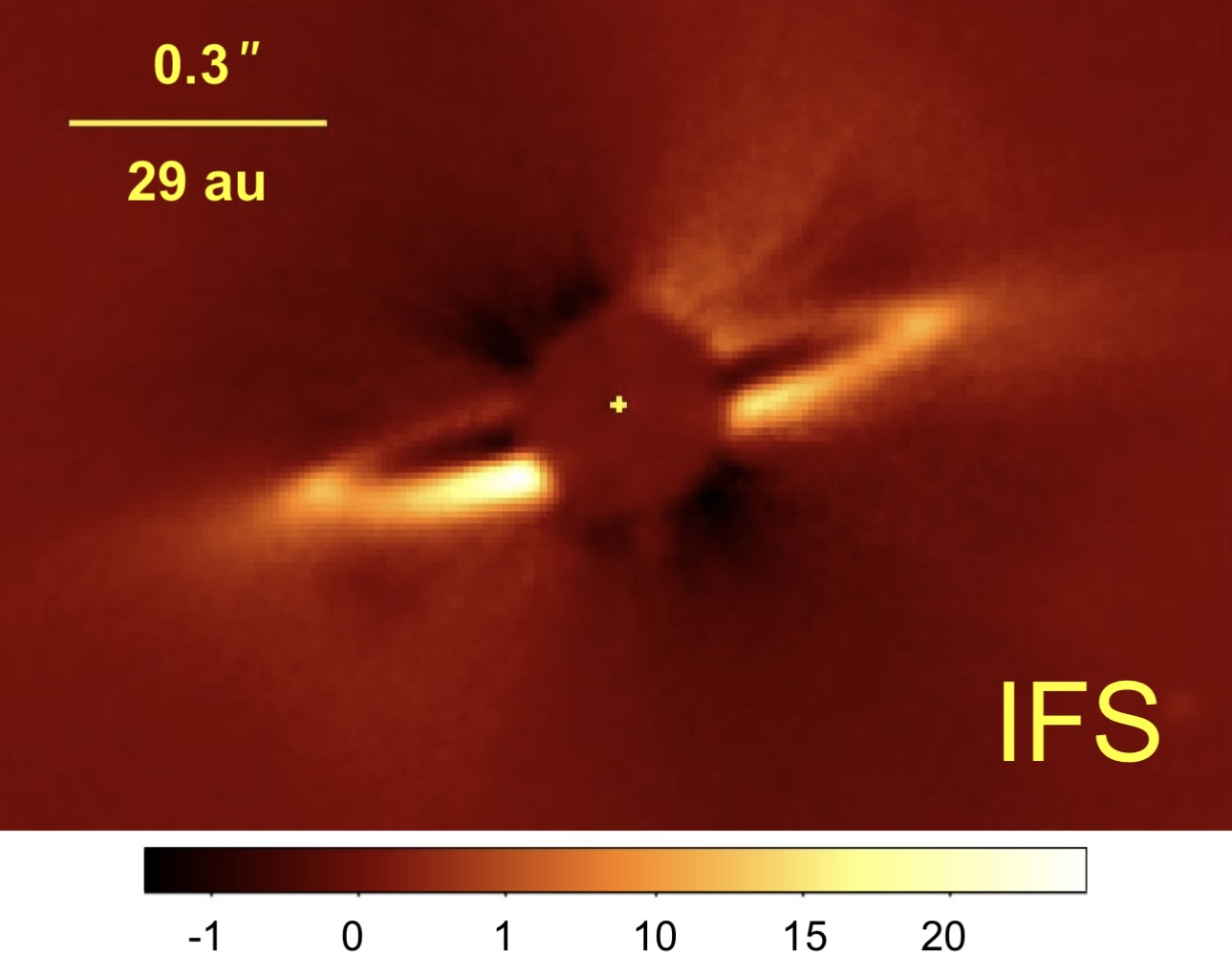
Total intensity image of the HD 114082 debris disk in 2022

A 2005 study of the Scorpius–Centaurus association with the Spitzer space telescope showed that HD 114082 displays an excess of infrared emission, measured at wavelengths of both 24 μm and 70 μm. This suggested the presence of an orbiting circumstellar disk. The disk image was resolved in 2016 using adaptive optics. It was found to have an inner edge at a radius of 27.7+2.8
−3.5 au and is inclined at an angle of 6.7°+3.8°
−0.4° to the line of sight from the Earth. The disk density declines outside that radius.

Between 2018 and 2022, HD 114082 was examined as part of a radial velocity survey of young stars with debris disks. In 2022, the discovery of a super-Jovian companion was announced. This exoplanet was confirmed by a transit event recorded in TESS photometry. Designated HD 114082 b, it had a preliminary orbit similar to Mercury but more eccentric. However, it was difficult to explain the large mass of this object using currently accepted models of planet formation.

A follow-up campaign was used to refine the orbit of the exoplanet. During this process, the transit of a second body was recorded, designated HD 114082 c. The properties of these bodies differ from the earlier model, which was found to be erroneous due to sparse data at the time. Both components are now considered puffy giant planets in near circular orbits. Component 'c' has a wider orbit than component 'b' and is somewhat larger. At discovery, these are the two longest period young transiting exoplanets known. Both are low density bodies and their orbital period ratios are in the range of commensurability at 7:5 and 3:2, suggesting mean motion resonance.

A re-examination of the disk in 2026 found the excess infrared emission is consistent with two dust components. The inner belt, orbiting at a loosely-constrained radius of 1.3+1.1
−3.8 au, is likely to be dynamically influenced by the two exoplanets to a significant degree. The outer belt is misaligned with the orbital plane of the exoplanet companions by an angle of around 7°. It is likely an exo-Kuiper Belt formation.

Here are the modeled physical properties and orbital elements of the two companions as of 2026:

The HD 114082 planetary system
Companion (in order from star)	Mass	Semimajor axis (AU)	Orbital period (days)	Eccentricity	Inclination (°)	Radius
b	1.6 M_{J}	0.791±0.008	225.5504±0.0004	0 (fixed)	89.791±0.014	1.046±0.014 R_{J}
c	2.0 M_{J}	0.99^{+0.03}_{−0.04}	314±18	0 (fixed)	89.701±0.011	1.36±0.03 R_{J}
