= HD 182681 =

B-type main sequence star in the constellation Sagittarius

- Image of the debris disk from the REASONS survey

Observation data Epoch J2000.0 Equinox J2000.0 (ICRS)
- Constellation: Sagittarius
- Right ascension: 19^{h} 26^{m} 56.4828^{s}
- Declination: −29° 44′ 35.612″
- Apparent magnitude (V): +5.64

Characteristics
- Evolutionary stage: main sequence
- Spectral type: B8.5V

Astrometry
Radial velocity (R_{v})	1.40 km/s
Proper motion (μ)	RA: +18.349 mas/yr Dec.: -50.126 mas/yr
Parallax (π)	14.0013±0.1325 mas
Distance	233 ± 2 ly (71.4 ± 0.7 pc)
Absolute magnitude (M_{V})	+1.44

Details
Mass	2.33 M_{☉}
Radius	2.8 R_{☉}
Luminosity	31 L_{☉}
Surface gravity (log g)	4.3 cgs
Temperature	10,046 K
Rotational velocity (v sin i)	277 km/s
Age	107 Myr

Other designations
- CD−29°16140, HD 182681, HIP 95619, HR 7380, SAO 188127, 186 G. Sagittarii

Database references
SIMBAD	data

HD 182681 (186 G. Sagittarii) is a single, blue-hued star in the zodiac constellation of Sagittarius. It has an apparent visual magnitude of +5.64, which is bright enough to be visible to the naked eye in good conditions. Based upon an annual parallax shift of 14.0013 mas as seen from Earth, this star is located around 233 light years from the Sun. It is moving away from the Sun with a radial velocity of 1.40 km/s.

This is a B-type main sequence star with a stellar classification of B8.5V. The star is about 107 million years old and is spinning rapidly with a projected rotational velocity of 277 km/s. It has an infrared excess, which suggests a debris disk is orbiting the star at a radius of 47 AU with a mean temperature of 90 K.
