= HD 170773 =

F-type star with a debris disk

- Image of the disk with the REASONS survey

Observation data Epoch J2000.0 Equinox ICRS
- Constellation: Corona Australis
- Right ascension: 18^{h} 33^{m} 00.91673^{s}
- Declination: −39° 53′ 31.2751″
- Apparent magnitude (V): 6.22±0.01

Characteristics
- Evolutionary stage: main sequence
- Spectral type: F5 V
- B−V color index: +0.42

Astrometry
Radial velocity (R_{v})	−25.2±1.0 km/s
Proper motion (μ)	RA: +86.353 mas/yr Dec.: −79.927 mas/yr
Parallax (π)	27.0749±0.03 mas
Distance	120.5 ± 0.1 ly (36.93 ± 0.04 pc)
Absolute magnitude (M_{V})	+3.38

Details
Mass	1.30 M_{☉}
Radius	1.43±0.07 R_{☉}
Luminosity	3.62±0.01 L_{☉}
Surface gravity (log g)	4.21±0.04 cgs
Temperature	6,694±126 K
Metallicity [Fe/H]	−0.02±0.04 dex
Rotational velocity (v sin i)	67.2±6.2 km/s
Age	1.50^{+1.2}_{−0.7} Gyr

Other designations
- 14 G. Coronae Australis, CD−39°12704, CPD−39°8118, FK5 3470, GC 25304, HD 170773, HIP 90936, HR 6948, SAO 210286, TIC 313723578
- Location of HD 170773 on the map (circled)

Database references
SIMBAD	data

HD 170773 (HR 6948; 14 G. Coronae Australis) is a solitary star located in the southern constellation Corona Australis. It has an apparent magnitude of 6.22, placing it near the limit for naked eye visibility, even under ideal conditions. The object is located relatively close at a distance of 120 light-years based on Gaia DR3 parallax measurements and it is drifting closer with a heliocentric radial velocity of −25.2 km/s. At its current distance, HD 170773's brightness is diminished by an interstellar extinction of 0.19 magnitudes and it has an absolute magnitude of +3.38.

HD 170773 has a stellar classification of F5 V, indicating that it is an ordinary F-type main-sequence star that is generating energy via hydrogen fusion at its core. It has also been given a classification of F5 IV, indicating that it is a slightly evolved subgiant that is ceasing hydrogen fusion at its core. It has 1.30 times the mass of the Sun and 1.43 times the radius of the Sun. It radiates 3.62 times the luminosity of the Sun from its photosphere at an effective temperature of 6,694 K, giving it the typical yellowish-white hue of a F-type star. HD 170773 has a near solar metallicity of [Fe/H] = −0.02 and it is estimated to be 1.5 billion years old. It spins fairly quickly with a projected rotational velocity of 67.2 km/s.

The star has a debris disk located 78 AU away and it has a temperature of 43 K. It was first observed in 1986 by astronomers K. Sakadane and M. Nishida in their survey of Vega-like stars due to the star displaying an infrared excess that could suggest the presence of a circumstellar disk. However, the actual disk was not discovered until 2004 using the Spitzer Space Telescope. There might be a second cooler disk surrounding the star, but subsequent observations have not confirmed this.
