= Dracula's Chivito =

Protoplanetary disk in the constellation Cepheus

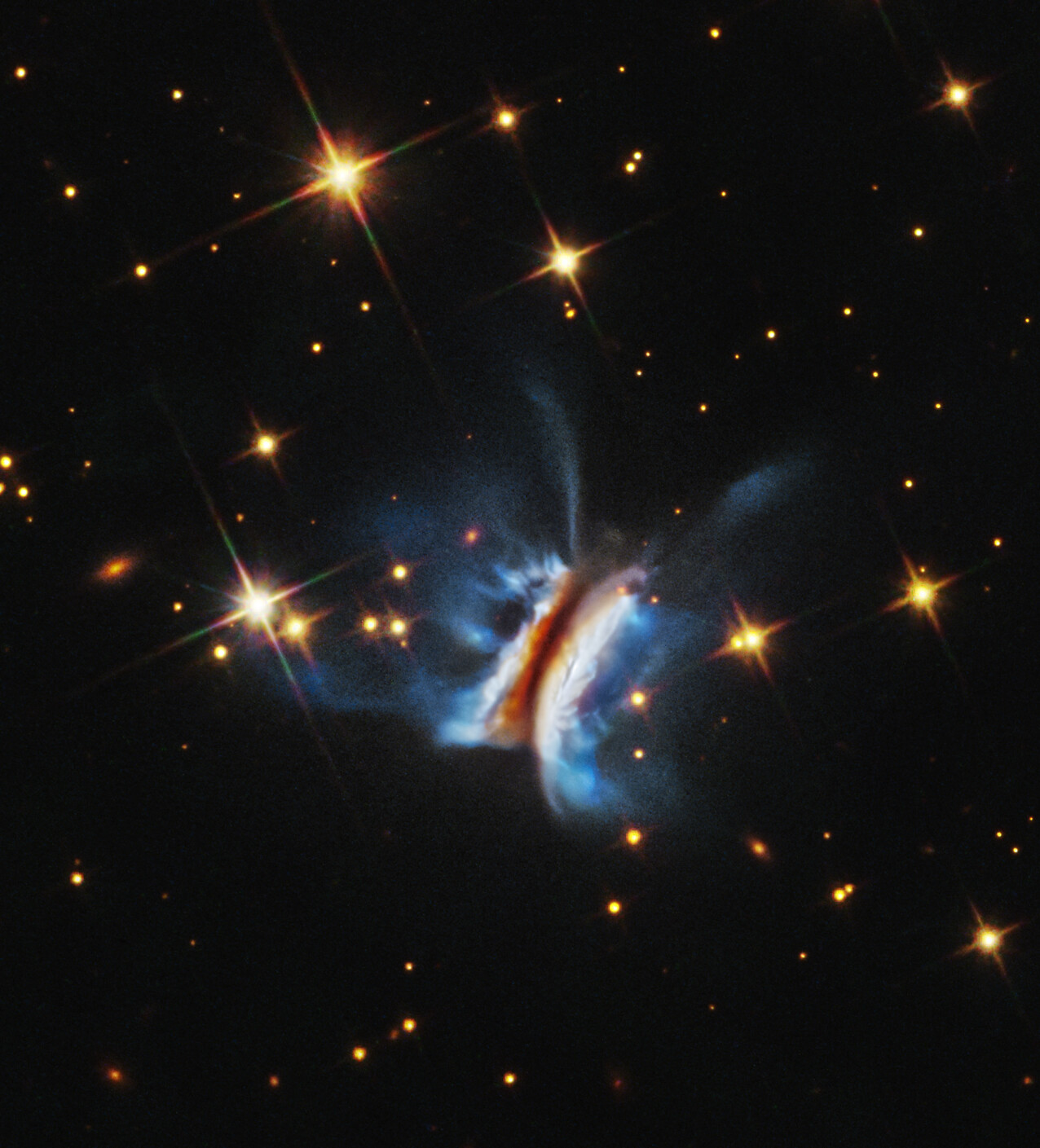
- IRAS 23077+6707; Credit: Hubble image of the disk.

Observation data Epoch J2000 Equinox J2000
- Constellation: Cepheus
- Right ascension: 23^{h} 09^{m} 43.73^{s}
- Declination: +67° 23′ 40.0″
- Apparent magnitude (V): 14.247±0.050

Characteristics
- Evolutionary stage: Herbig Ae
- Spectral type: A9

Details
Mass	1.5-2.0 M_{☉}
Luminosity	11.5 L_{☉}
Temperature	6500-8500 K

Other designations
- DraChi, 2MASX J23094364+6723389, WB89 253, Kn 32, WISEA J230943.64+672339.5

Database references
SIMBAD	data

IRAS 23077+6707, also known as Dracula's Chivito, is a protoplanetary disk seen edge-on. The disk blocks the light of the young star, causing the dark band in the middle. Dust particles scatter the light from the star, causing the bright nebula above and below the disk. The disk is 11 arcseconds in diameter and its distance is poorly constrained.

== Name ==
IRAS 23077+6707 is the name of the infrared source observed by IRAS. The discoverers named the object Dracula's Chivito (DraChi), in reference to Gomez's Hamburger (GoHam), a well-known edge-on protoplanetary disk. The first part of the name is in reference to the fictional character of Count Dracula, called so because the first author Ciprian Berghea grew up in Transylvania and because the very faint protrusions extending far out north from the two disk lobes resembling 'fangs'. The second part is in reference to a chivito, suggested by the co-author Ana Mosquera, who is from Uruguay.

== Discovery ==
IRAS 23077+6707 was first observed as a possible pre-main-sequence star in 1993 and in 2014 it was identified as a possible young stellar object with the help of AKARI. The disk around IRAS 23077+6707 was discovered in 2016 from Pan-STARRS images during the search for Active Galactic Nuclei. Later a group of French amateur astronomers suspected this object to be a planetary nebula and in 2019 obtained a spectrum of the nebula. This spectrum helped to characterize the star in this system.

== Physical parameters ==
The discovery paper adopted a distance of around 300 parsec and measured an inclination of 82° for the disk. The researchers use this distance to infer a disk radius of 1650 astronomical units and a disk mass of 0.2 M_{☉}. The spectrum showed a spectral type of A9 for the central star, with a mass between 1.5 and 2.0 M_{☉}. The central star is suspected to be a Herbig Ae star. DraChi is the only third edge-on disk hosting such a massive star (the previous ones being Gomez's Hamburger and PDS 144N) and the largest of them.

Later observations with the Submillimeter Array (SMA) detected carbon monoxide (CO) gas emission in this disk. This gas shows Keplerian rotation, thus confirming a rotating disk around a very young star as opposed to a planetary nebula and a dying star. Observations with SMA and NOEMA did show evidence of disk rings and a central cavity. The radial structure is asymmetric, with the north being brighter than the south. Several origins are discussed in the paper, including the possibility of an eccentric disk (e ≈ 0.26).

Observations with Hubble did show that the disk has brightness asymmetries and signatures of dynamical activity. Filaments are extending 10 arcseconds from the northern edges of both reflection nebulae. The wispy features extend well above the midplane and suggest a complex outer disk atmosphere. This wispy structure could be shaped by infall, dynamical stirring, or gravitational instability. The central dark lane is thinner in the near-infrared and compact in emission in the millimeter data. This narrowing could be opacity effects or dust settling. No jets are detected, indicating it is a more evolved class II disk.

== Gallery ==
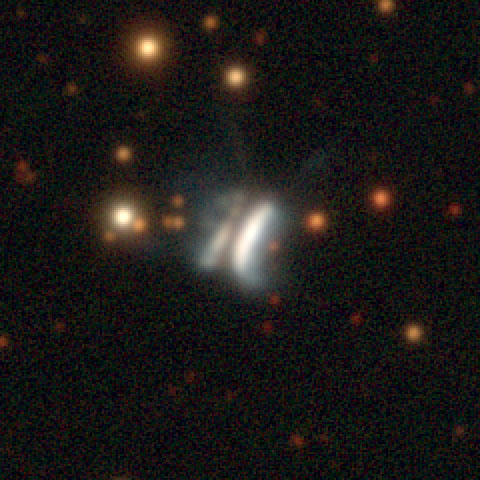
PanSTARRS image of the disk.

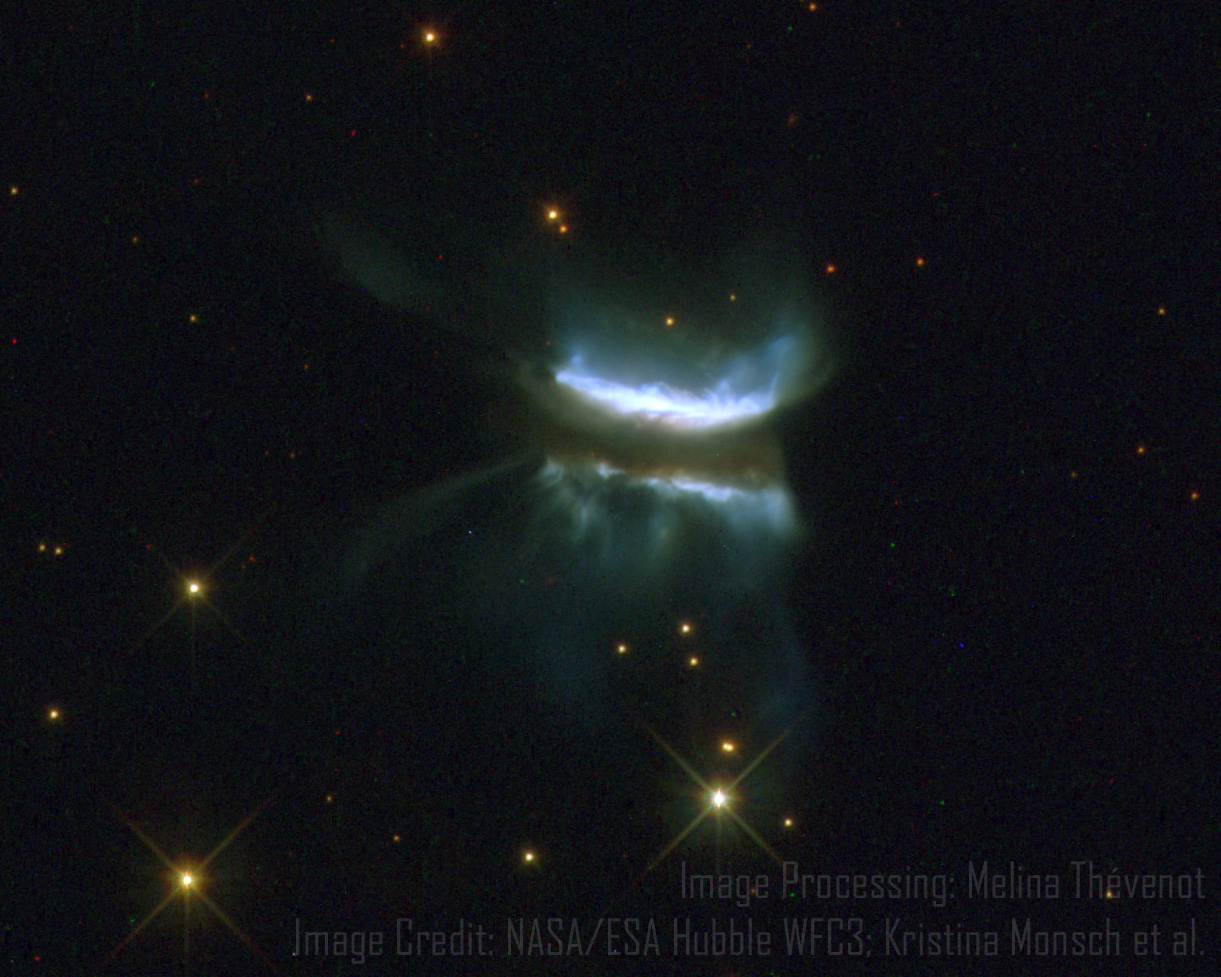
Hubble observation at optical wavelengths

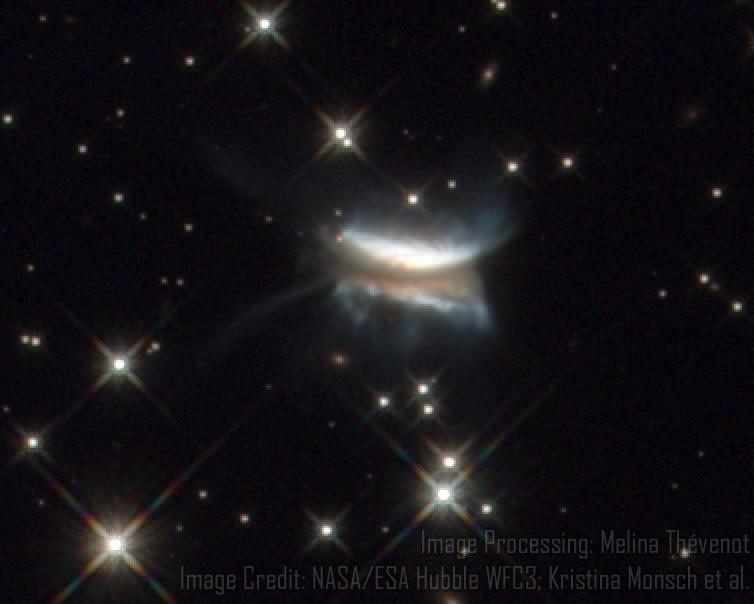
Infrared image of the disk with Hubble.

== See also ==
- List of resolved circumstellar disks

examples of other protoplanetary disks:

- TW Hydrae
- AB Aurigae
- IM Lupi
