= Gomez's Hamburger =

Astronomical object

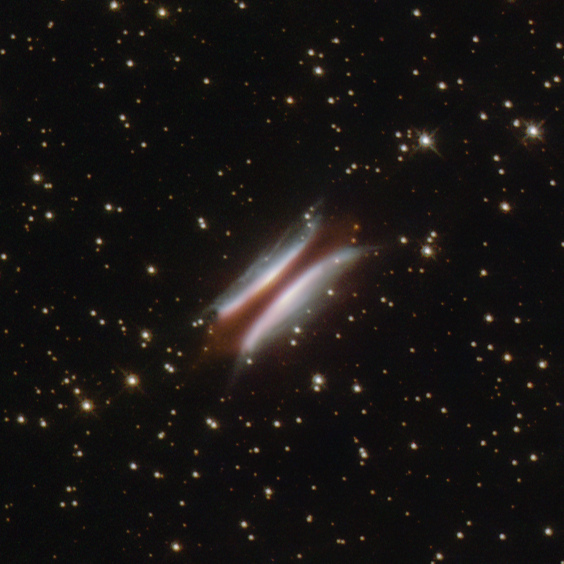
- IRAS 18059−3211 as seen by Hubble

Observation data Epoch J2000 Equinox ICRS
- Constellation: Sagittarius
- Right ascension: 18^{h} 09^{m} 13.40^{s}
- Declination: −32° 10′ 50.0″
- Apparent magnitude (V): 14.4

Characteristics
- Spectral type: A0III:

Astrometry
Distance	139±24 pc

Details
Mass	2.5±0.5 M_{☉}
Luminosity	~15 L_{☉}
Temperature	~10,000 K

Other designations
- IRAS 18059−3211

Database references
SIMBAD	data

Gomez's Hamburger, also known as IRAS 18059−3211 or Gomez's Whopper, is an astronomical object believed to be a young A-type star surrounded by a protoplanetary disk. It was initially identified as a planetary nebula, and its distance was estimated to be approximately 6,500 light-years away from Earth. However, recent results suggest that this object is a young star surrounded by a protoplanetary disk, at a distance of about 900 light-years away. The distance was later revised to a closer distance of 453 light years based on 3D interstellar extinction maps, placing it on the outskirts of the Scorpius-Centaurus association.

It was discovered in 1985 on sky photographs obtained by Arturo Gómez, support technical staff at the Cerro Tololo Inter-American Observatory near Vicuña, Chile. The photos suggested that there was a dark band across the object, but its exact structure was difficult to determine because of the atmospheric turbulence that hampers all images taken from the ground. The star itself has a surface temperature of approximately 10,000 K.

The "buns" are light reflecting off dust. A disk of dust seen nearly exactly edge-on obscures the star and produces the dark band in the middle, the "burger". It has a dim visual magnitude of 14.4.

== Possible protoplanet ==
An emission at the southern part of the disk seen in carbon monoxide imaging, as well as in mid-infrared imaging, was interpreted as a protoplanet candidate, termed GoHam b. This candidate would have a mass of 0.8–11.4 M_{J}. Protoplanetary disk can however form disk fragments that are gravitationally bound and can mimic protoplanets. In the case of GoHam b it is not clear if it is a protoplanet or just a disk fragment. Observations with ALMA did detect a one-sided arc of sulfur monoxide (SO) that peaks near the position of GoHam b. The researchers say this suggests heating around an early stage protoplanet or disk fragment.

== Gallery ==
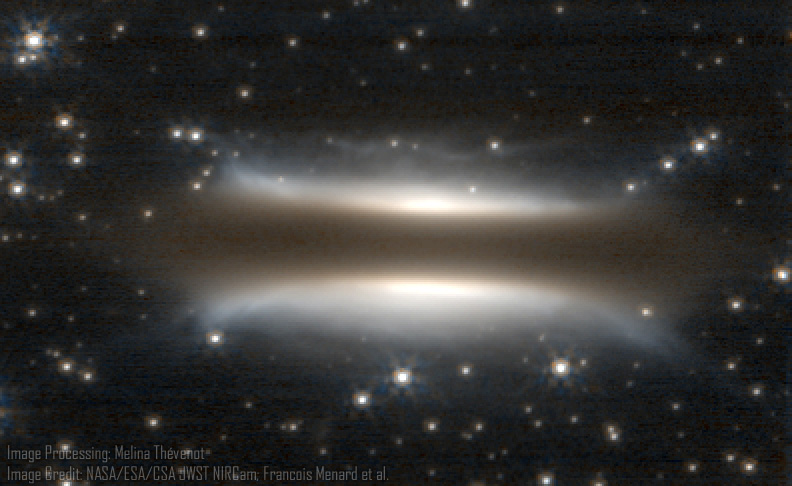
James Webb Space Telescope NIRCam image of GoHam

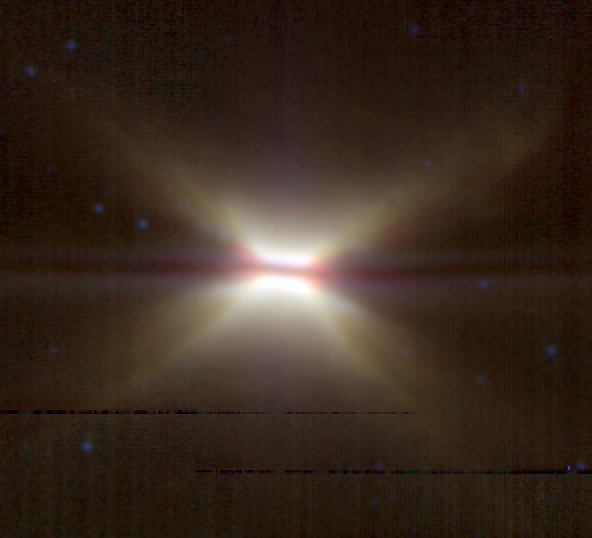
JWST MIRI image of GoHam

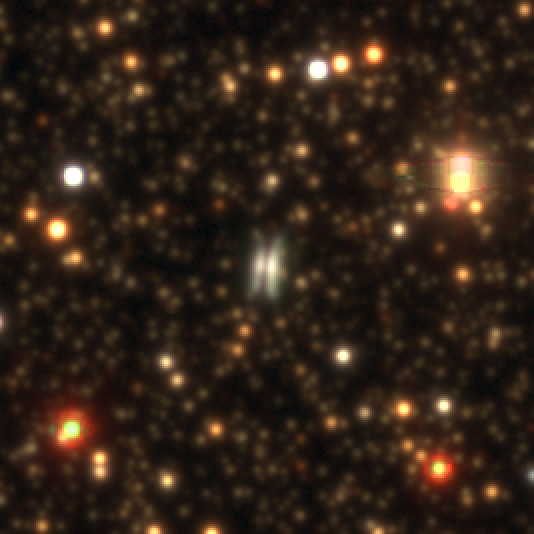
Gomez's Hamburger from the ground with DESI legacy surveys
