= List of star systems within 25–30 light-years =

This is a list of star systems within 25–30 light-years of Earth.

== List ==
Key
#	Visible to the unaided eye
$	Bright star (absolute magnitude of +8.5 or brighter)
‡	White dwarf
§	Brown dwarf or sub-brown dwarf
*	Nearest in constellation

System	Star or (sub-) brown dwarf	Distance (ly)	Constellation	Coordinates: RA, Dec (Ep J2000, Eq J2000)	Stellar class	Apparent magnitude (V)	Parallax (mas)	Notes and additional references
GJ 4248 (L 499-56)		25.008±0.010	Grus	22^{h} 02^{m} 29.4^{s} −37° 04′ 51″	M3.5	11.80	130.4186±0.0534	
Mu Cassiopeiae (Gliese 53)	A$	25.033±0.084	Cassiopeia	01^{h} 08^{m} 16.4^{s} +54° 55′ 13″	G5VIp	5.14#	130.2881±0.4348	
Mu Cassiopeiae (Gliese 53)	B	25.033±0.084	Cassiopeia	01^{h} 08^{m} 16.4^{s} +54° 55′ 13″	M5V	11.45	130.2881±0.4348	
Alpha Piscis Austrini	C (LP 876-10)	25.0368±0.0062	Aquarius	22^{h} 48^{m} 04.5^{s} −24° 22′ 08″	M4V	12.624	130.2707±0.0325	component C of triple system
Vega (Alpha Lyrae)$		25.045 ± 0.069	Lyra	18^{h} 36^{m} 56.3^{s} +38° 47′ 01″	A0Va	0.03#	130.23±0.36	
VX Arietis (Gliese 109)		25.0513±0.0054	Aries	02^{h} 44^{m} 15.5^{s} +25° 31′ 24″	M3.5V	10.56	130.1956±0.0281	flare star
Alpha Piscis Austrini	A (Fomalhaut)$	25.126±0.091	Piscis Austrinus	22^{h} 57^{m} 39.0^{s} −29° 37′ 20″	A3V	1.16#	129.81±0.47	has 1 refuted planet, component A of triple system
AN Sextantis (Gliese 382)		25.1364±0.0049	Sextans	10^{h} 12^{m} 17.7^{s} −03° 44′ 44″	M1V	9.264	129.7544±0.0252	
Gliese 673 (HD 157881)$		25.1575±0.0034	Ophiuchus	17^{h} 25^{m} 45.2^{s} +02° 06′ 41″	K7V	7.492	129.6459±0.0175	
SIPS 1259-4336		25.200±0.012	Centaurus	12^{h} 59^{m} 04.7^{s} −43° 36′ 24″	M7.5V	18.01	129.4288±0.0620	
LHS 1070 (LP 881-64, GJ 2005)	A	25.222±0.024	Sculptor	00^{h} 24^{m} 44.2^{s} −27° 08′ 25″	M5.5-6V	15.35	129.3167±0.1256	
LHS 1070 (LP 881-64, GJ 2005)	B	25.222±0.024	Sculptor	00^{h} 24^{m} 44.2^{s} −27° 08′ 25″	M8.5V		129.3167±0.1256	
LHS 1070 (LP 881-64, GJ 2005)	C	25.222±0.024	Sculptor	00^{h} 24^{m} 44.2^{s} −27° 08′ 25″	M9-9.5V		129.3167±0.1256	
G 192-13 (GJ 3378)		25.2245±0.0055	Camelopardalis	06^{h} 01^{m} 11.0^{s} +59° 35′ 50″	M4.0Ve	7.465 (J)	129.3014±0.0283	
Gliese 701 (HD 165222)		25.2407±0.0050	Serpens*	18^{h} 05^{m} 07.6^{s} −03° 01′ 53″	M1V	9.9	129.2184±0.0256	
GJ 1093 (G 109-35)		25.286±0.012	Gemini	06^{h} 59^{m} 28.8^{s} +19° 20′ 56″	M5Ve		128.9866±0.0607	
LP 71-82 (G 227-22)		25.4203±0.0063	Draco	18^{h} 02^{m} 16.6^{s} +64° 15′ 44″	M5.0V	13.51	128.3057±0.0319	Very rapid star rotation
WISE 1800+0134§		25.47±0.10	Ophiuchus	18^{h} 00^{m} 26.5^{s} +01° 34′ 57″	L7.5	14.30 (J)	128.0546±0.5101	
Gliese 623	A	25.585±0.097	Hercules	16^{h} 24^{m} 09.3^{s} +48° 21′ 11″	M3.0Ve		127.4785±0.4818	
Gliese 623	B	25.585±0.097	Hercules	16^{h} 24^{m} 09.3^{s} +48° 21′ 11″	M		127.4785±0.4818	
WISE J0005+3737§		25.70±0.43	Andromeda	00^{h} 05^{m} 17.5^{s} +37° 37′ 21″	T9		126.9±2.1	
Gliese 54 (CD-68 47)	A	25.702±0.081	Tucana*	01^{h} 10^{m} 22.9^{s} −67° 26′ 42″	M2.5V	9.80	126.9±0.4	
Gliese 54 (CD-68 47)	B	25.702±0.081	Tucana*	01^{h} 10^{m} 22.9^{s} −67° 26′ 42″	M		126.9±0.4	
2MASS 0729-3954§		25.82±1.82	Puppis*	07^{h} 29^{m} 00.0^{s} −39° 54′ 04″	T8		126.3±8.3	
GJ 1224 (G 154-44)		25.9987±0.0063	Serpens	18^{h} 07^{m} 32.8^{s} −15° 57′ 47″	M4Ve	13.48	125.4509±0.0306	
SCR J0740−4257		26.0295±0.0045	Puppis	07^{h} 40^{m} 11.8^{s} −42° 57′ 40″	M4.5	13.81	125.3028±0.0215	
BB Capricorni (Wolf 922, Gliese 831)	A	26.030±0.062	Capricornus	21^{h} 31^{m} 18.6^{s} −09° 47′ 26″	M4.5V	12.66	125.3±0.3	
BB Capricorni (Wolf 922, Gliese 831)	B	26.030±0.062	Capricornus	21^{h} 31^{m} 18.6^{s} −09° 47′ 26″	M	14.76	125.3±0.3	
Gliese 257 (CD-44 3045)	A	26.2274±0.0084	Puppis	06^{h} 57^{m} 46.6^{s} −44° 17′ 28″	M3.5V	11.48	124.3569±0.0399	
Gliese 257 (CD-44 3045)	B	26.2274±0.0084	Puppis	06^{h} 57^{m} 46.6^{s} −44° 17′ 28″	M3	11.29	124.3569±0.0399	
GJ 1151 (G 122-49)		26.231±0.012	Ursa Major	11^{h} 50^{m} 57.7^{s} +48° 22′ 39″	M4.5	14.008	124.3378±0.0549	has 1 known planet
Gliese 480.1 (L 399-68)		26.2637±0.0062	Centaurus	12^{h} 40^{m} 46.3^{s} +43° 33′ 59″	M3V	12.239	124.1851±0.0295	
Pi^{3} Orionis (Tabit)$		26.316±0.036	Orion	04^{h} 49^{m} 50.4^{s} +06° 57′ 41″	F6V	3.16#	123.94±0.17	
Gliese 486 (Wolf 437/Gar)		26.3506±0.0070	Virgo	12^{h} 47^{m} 56.6^{s} +09° 45′ 05″	M3.5Ve	11.395	123.7756±0.0329	has one known planet
2MASS J21481628+4003593§		26.37±0.08	Cygnus	21^{h} 48^{m} 16.3^{s} +40° 03′ 59″	L6.5pec (red)		123.6752±0.3595	
Gliese 793 (G 262-15)		26.3764±0.0032	Cepheus	20^{h} 30^{m} 32.0^{s} +65° 26′ 58″	M3V		123.6547±0.0148	
GJ 1154 (G 13-22)		26.3789±0.0096	Virgo	12^{h} 14^{m} 16.5^{s} +00° 37′ 26″	M4.5Ve		123.6430±0.0449	
Gliese 300 (L 674-15)		26.4730±0.0051	Puppis	08^{h} 12^{m} 40.9^{s} −21° 33′ 07″	M3.5V	12.13	123.2033±0.0236	
G 99-47 (EGGR 290, GJ 1087)‡		26.4740±0.0037	Orion	05^{h} 56^{m} 25.5^{s} +05° 21′ 48″	DAP8.9	14.105	123.1989±0.0170	
Gliese 686		26.6132±0.0038	Hercules	17^{h} 37^{m} 53.3^{s} +18° 35′ 30″	M1V	9.577	122.5546±0.0176	has 1 known planet
Gliese 293 (LAWD 26, L 97-12)‡		26.6439±0.0025	Volans*	07^{h} 53^{m} 08.1^{s} −67° 47′ 31″	DC8.8	12.726 (J)	122.4130±0.0114	
UGPS J0521+3640§		26.69±0.35	Auriga	05^{h} 21^{m} 26.9^{s} +36° 41′ 00″	T8.5		122.2±1.6	
p Eridani (Gliese 66)	A$	26.7334±0.0070	Eridanus	01^{h} 39^{m} 47.6^{s} −56° 11′ 47″	K2V	5.82#	122.0035±0.0319	
p Eridani (Gliese 66)	B$	26.7334±0.0070	Eridanus	01^{h} 39^{m} 47.6^{s} −56° 11′ 47″	K2V	5.95#	122.0035±0.0319	
L 173-19		26.7982±0.0070	Eridanus	02^{h} 00^{m} 38.3^{s} −55° 58′ 05″	MV		121.7084±0.0319	
Gliese 884 (HD 217357)$		26.8502±0.0055	Aquarius	23^{h} 00^{m} 16.1^{s} −22° 31′ 28″	K7+Vk	7.88	121.4724±0.0249	
Gliese 48 (Ross 318)		26.8530±0.0035	Cassiopeia	01^{h} 02^{m} 32.2^{s} +71° 40′ 47″	M3.0Ve		121.4598±0.0158	has 1 known planet
WISEPC J115013.88+630240.7§		26.87±0.61	Ursa Major	11^{h} 50^{m} 13.9^{s} +63° 02′ 42″	T8		121.4±2.7	
Gliese 747 (G 207-16)	A	27.134±0.045	Lyra	19^{h} 07^{m} 43.0^{s} +32° 32′ 42″	M3V		120.2±0.2	
Gliese 747 (G 207-16)	B	27.134±0.045	Lyra	19^{h} 07^{m} 43.0^{s} +32° 32′ 42″	M		120.2±0.2	
2MASS 0348-6022§		27.16±0.41	Reticulum	03^{h} 48^{m} 07.7^{s} −60° 22′ 27″	T7		120.1±1.8	
Chi Draconis	A$	27.17±0.13	Draco	18^{h} 21^{m} 03.4^{s} +72° 43′ 58″	F7V	3.68#	124.11±0.87	
Chi Draconis	B$	27.17±0.13	Draco	18^{h} 21^{m} 03.4^{s} +72° 43′ 58″	K0V	5.67#	124.11±0.87	
WD 2359-434 (LAWD 96, Gliese 915)‡		27.176±0.0049	Phoenix*	00^{h} 02^{m} 10.7^{s} −43° 09′ 55″	DAP5.8		120.0143±0.0215	
Mu Herculis	Aa$	27.197±0.035	Hercules	17^{h} 46^{m} 27.5^{s} +27° 43′ 15″	G5IV	3.42#	119.9248±0.1543	
Mu Herculis	Ab	27.197±0.035	Hercules	17^{h} 46^{m} 27.5^{s} +27° 43′ 15″	M4V		119.9248±0.1543	
Mu Herculis	B	27.197±0.035	Hercules	17^{h} 46^{m} 27.5^{s} +27° 43′ 15″	M3.5V		119.9248±0.1543	
Mu Herculis	C	27.197±0.035	Hercules	17^{h} 46^{m} 27.5^{s} +27° 43′ 15″	M		119.9248±0.1543	
Wolf 489‡		27.2349±0.0069	Virgo	13^{h} 36^{m} 31.8^{s} +03° 40′ 45″	DZ10.0		119.7566±0.0304	
GJ 1227 (G 227-29)		27.2360±0.0078	Draco	18^{h} 22^{m} 27.1^{s} +62° 03′ 02″	M4.0V		119.7519±0.0341	
GJ 1289 (G 130-4)		27.275±0.013	Andromeda	23^{h} 43^{m} 06.3^{s} +36° 32′ 13″	MV		119.5794±0.0563	has 1 known planet
Gliese 185 (HD 32450)	A	27.2766±0.0096	Lepus	05^{h} 02^{m} 28.5^{s} −21° 15′ 24″	K7V		119.5737±0.0420	
Gliese 185 (HD 32450)	B	27.2766±0.0096	Lepus	05^{h} 02^{m} 28.5^{s} −21° 15′ 24″	M		119.5737±0.0420	
SCR 1138-7721		27.3296±0.0070	Chamaeleon*	11^{h} 38^{m} 16.8^{s} −77° 21′ 49″	MV		119.3419±0.0305	
SCR J1546−5534	A	27.39±0.16	Norma	15^{h} 46^{m} 41.7^{s} −55° 34′ 47″	M7.5		119.0962±0.7032	
SCR J1546−5534	B§	27.39±0.16	Norma	15^{h} 46^{m} 41.7^{s} −55° 34′ 47″	T8		119.0962±0.7032	
2MASS J00345157+0523050§		27.45±0.64	Pisces	00^{h} 34^{m} 51.6^{s} +05° 23′ 05″	T6.5		118.8±2.7	
Welopōʻai	Aa (IRAS 21500+5903)	27.604±0.0036	Cepheus	21^{h} 51^{m} 38.3^{s} +59° 17′ 40″	M4V		118.1551±0.0155	
Welopōʻai	Ab‡	27.604±0.0036	Cepheus	21^{h} 51^{m} 38.3^{s} +59° 17′ 40″	DAH		118.1551±0.0155	
Welopōʻai	B (UCAC4 747-070768)‡	27.604±0.0036	Cepheus	21^{h} 51^{m} 38.3^{s} +59° 17′ 40″	DAH		118.1551±0.0155	
Beta Canum Venaticorum (Chara)$		27.634±0.036	Canes Venatici*	12^{h} 33^{m} 44.5^{s} +41° 21′ 27″	G0V	4.24#	118.0266±0.1530	
Gliese 232 (Ross 64)		27.7046±0.0065	Gemini	06^{h} 24^{m} 41.3^{s} +23° 25′ 59″	M4V		117.7263±0.0278	
Gliese 618 (CD-37 10765)	A	27.7647±0.0069	Scorpius	16^{h} 20^{m} 03.5^{s} −37° 31′ 44″	M3V		117.4716±0.0291	
Gliese 618 (CD-37 10765)	B	27.7647±0.0069	Scorpius	16^{h} 20^{m} 03.5^{s} −37° 31′ 44″	M5		117.4716±0.0291	
Gliese 318 (CD-32 5613, LAWD 28)‡		27.7826±0.0049	Pyxis*	08^{h} 41^{m} 32.4^{s} −32° 56′ 33″	DA5.5		117.3961±0.0205	suspected double white dwarf
61 Virginis$		27.836±0.035	Virgo	13^{h} 18^{m} 24.3^{s} −18° 18′ 40″	G7V	4.74#	117.1726±0.1456	has 3 known planets
GJ 1276 (EGGR 453)‡		27.8436±0.0081	Aquarius	22^{h} 53^{m} 53.3^{s} −06° 46′ 54″	DZ		117.1388±0.0341	
Gliese 493.1 (Wolf 461)		27.869±0.015	Virgo	13^{h} 00^{m} 33.5^{s} +05° 41′ 08″	M4.5Ve		117.0327±0.0613	
GJ 3454 (G 89-32)	A	27.97±0.23	Canis Minor	07^{h} 36^{m} 25.1^{s} +07° 04′ 43″	M4.5V		116.6±0.97	
GJ 3454 (G 89-32)	B	27.97±0.23	Canis Minor	07^{h} 36^{m} 25.1^{s} +07° 04′ 43″	M		116.6±0.97	
CWISEP 0402-2651§		28.02^{+5.99}_{−4.20}	Eridanus	02^{h} 02^{m} 16.2^{s} +10° 20′ 14″	Y1		116.4±20.5	
Gliese 877 (L 49-19)		28.0412±0.0041	Octans*	22^{h} 55^{m} 45.5^{s} −75° 27′ 31″	M3V	10.377	116.3134±0.0168	
CD Ceti (GJ 1057)		28.052±0.010	Cetus	03^{h} 13^{m} 22.9^{s} +04° 46′ 29″	M4.5Ve		116.2678±0.0427	has 1 known planet
Zeta Tucanae$		28.073±0.032	Tucana	00^{h} 20^{m} 04.3^{s} −64° 52′ 29″	F9.5V	4.23#	116.1826±0.1334	
LP 502-56 (NLTT 40406)		28.107±0.011	Serpens	15^{h} 30^{m} 30.3^{s} +09° 26′ 01″	M5.5V		116.0425±0.0435	
WISE 1647+5632§		28.12^{+9.37}_{−5.62}	Draco	16^{h} 47^{m} 15.8^{s} +56° 32′ 06″	T6	16.59	116±29	
CWISE 0617+1945	A§	28.2±5.7	Orion	06^{h} 17^{m} 41.8^{s} +19° 45′ 13″	L2			parallax uncertain, brown dwarfs are separated by about 37 AU
CWISE 0617+1945	B§	28.2±5.7	Orion	06^{h} 17^{m} 41.8^{s} +19° 45′ 13″	L4			parallax uncertain, brown dwarfs are separated by about 37 AU
GJ 3517 (LP 666-9)		28.242±0.018	Hydra	08^{h} 53^{m} 36.2^{s} −03° 29′ 32″	M9V	18.959	115.4876±0.0726	
Chi^{1} Orionis	A$	28.256±0.066	Orion	05^{h} 54^{m} 23.0^{s} +20° 16′ 34″	G0V	4.39#	115.43±0.27	
Chi^{1} Orionis	B	28.256±0.066	Orion	05^{h} 54^{m} 23.0^{s} +20° 16′ 34″			115.43±0.27	
AP Columbae		28.2636±0.0073	Columba*	06^{h} 04^{m} 32.2^{s} −34° 33′ 36″	M4.5Ve	12.96	115.3982±0.0298	
SIPS J1141-3624 (PM J11413-3624)		28.3408±0.0088	Centaurus	11^{h} 41^{m} 21.5^{s} −36° 24′ 35″	M5	13.105	115.0835±0.0359	
GJ 1207 (G 19-7)		28.3822±0.0062	Ophiuchus	16^{h} 57^{m} 05.7^{s} −04° 20′ 56″	M3.5Ve	12.25	114.9158±0.0252	
LP 991-84		28.459±0.010	Phoenix	01^{h} 39^{m} 21.7^{s} −39° 36′ 09″	M4.5V	14.403	114.604±0.0402	
Xi Ursae Majoris	Aa (Alula Australis)$	28.49±0.11	Ursa Major	11^{h} 18^{m} 10.9^{s} +31° 31′ 45″	F8.5:V	4.41#	114.4867±0.4316	
Xi Ursae Majoris	Ab	28.49±0.11	Ursa Major	11^{h} 18^{m} 10.9^{s} +31° 31′ 45″	M		114.4867±0.4316	
Xi Ursae Majoris	Ba$	28.49±0.11	Ursa Major	11^{h} 18^{m} 10.9^{s} +31° 31′ 45″	G2V	4.87#	114.4867±0.4316	
Xi Ursae Majoris	Bb	28.49±0.11	Ursa Major	11^{h} 18^{m} 10.9^{s} +31° 31′ 45″	M		114.4867±0.4316	
Xi Ursae Majoris	WISE J1118+3125§	28.49±0.11	Ursa Major	11^{h} 18^{m} 10.9^{s} +31° 31′ 45″	T8.5		114.4867±0.4316	
2MASS 0036+1821 (LSPM J0036+1821)§		28.492±0.034	Pisces	00^{h} 36^{m} 16.17^{s} 18° +21′ 10.4″	L3.5		114.4735±0.1381	
Gliese 250 (HD 50281)	A$	28.5373±0.0055	Monoceros	06^{h} 52^{m} 18.1^{s} −05° 10′ 25″	K3V	6.58	114.2911±0.0219	
Gliese 250 (HD 50281)	Ba	28.5373±0.0055	Monoceros	06^{h} 52^{m} 18.1^{s} −05° 10′ 25″	M2.5V		114.2911±0.0219	
Gliese 250 (HD 50281)	Bb	28.5373±0.0055	Monoceros	06^{h} 52^{m} 18.1^{s} −05° 10′ 25″			114.2911±0.0219	
Gliese 450 (MCC 135)		28.5888±0.0048	Ursa Major	11^{h} 51^{m} 07.3^{s} +35° 16′ 19″	M1.5V		114.0854±0.0191	
GJ 1103	A	28.61	Canis Minor	07^{h} 51^{m} 54.67^{s} −00° 00′ 12.25″	M4.5V		107.8488±0.0421	
GJ 1103	B	28.61	Canis Minor	07^{h} 51^{m} 54.67^{s} −00° 00′ 12.25″	MV		107.8488±0.0421	
WISENF 1936+0408§		28.64±0.99	Aquila	19^{h} 36^{m} 56.1^{s} +04° 08′ 01″	Y0		113.9±3.8	spectral type is uncertain
41 G. Arae	A$	28.673±0.018	Ara	17^{h} 19^{m} 03.8^{s} −46° 38′ 10″	G8V	5.55#	113.7513±0.0725	
41 G. Arae	Ba	28.673±0.018	Ara	17^{h} 19^{m} 03.8^{s} −46° 38′ 10″	M0V		113.7513±0.0725	
41 G. Arae	Bb	28.673±0.018	Ara	17^{h} 19^{m} 03.8^{s} −46° 38′ 10″			113.7513±0.0725	
HD 192310 (5 G. Capricorni, HR 7722, Gliese 785)$		28.739±0.013	Capricornus	20^{h} 15^{m} 17.4^{s} −27° 01′ 59″	K2+V	5.73#	113.4872±0.0516	has 2 known planets
Gliese 849		28.7503±0.0076	Aquarius	22^{h} 09^{m} 40.3^{s} –04° 38′ 27″	M3.5V		113.4447±0.0300	has 2 known planets
HU Delphini (Gliese 791.2)	A	28.762±0.051	Delphinus	20^{h} 29^{m} 48.3^{s} +09° 41′ 20″	M4.5V		113.4±0.2	
HU Delphini (Gliese 791.2)	B	28.762±0.051	Delphinus	20^{h} 29^{m} 48.3^{s} +09° 41′ 20″	M		113.4±0.2	
Gliese 745	A (Ross 730)	28.8066±0.0049	Sagitta*	19^{h} 07^{m} 05.6^{s} +20° 53′ 17″	M2.0V		113.2228±0.0192	
Gliese 745	B (HD 349726)	28.8066±0.0049	Sagitta*	19^{h} 07^{m} 05.6^{s} +20° 53′ 17″	M2V		113.2228±0.0192	
IRAS 06355-7535 (LDS 169)	A (L 32-9)	28.8301±0.0043	Mensa*	06^{h} 33^{m} 47.0^{s} −75° 37′ 46″	M2V	10.484	113.1304±0.0169	
IRAS 06355-7535 (LDS 169)	B (L 32-8)	28.8301±0.0043	Mensa*	06^{h} 33^{m} 47.0^{s} −75° 37′ 46″	M3V	11.419	113.1304±0.0169	
HR 1614 (284 G. Eridani, HD 32147, Gliese 183)$		28.8451±0.0057	Eridanus	05^{h} 00^{m} 49.0^{s} −05° 45′ 13″	K3V	6.22#	113.0715±0.0222	
GJ 1105 (G 111-47)		28.8653±0.0066	Lynx*	07^{h} 58^{m} 12.7^{s} +41° 18′ 13″	M3.5Ve		112.9927±0.0259	
Gliese 867	A (FK Aquarii)	28.8668±0.0099	Aquarius	22^{h} 38^{m} 45.6^{s} −20° 37′ 16″	M0Vep		112.9867±0.0387	
Gliese 867	B (FL Aquarii)	28.8668±0.0099	Aquarius	22^{h} 38^{m} 45.6^{s} −20° 37′ 16″	M3.5V		112.9867±0.0387	
Gliese 867	C	28.8668±0.0099	Aquarius	22^{h} 38^{m} 45.6^{s} −20° 37′ 16″			112.9867±0.0387	
Gliese 867	D	28.8668±0.0099	Aquarius	22^{h} 38^{m} 45.6^{s} −20° 37′ 16″			112.9867±0.0387	
Ross 695 (Gliese 465)		28.9469±0.0062	Corvus*	12^{h} 24^{m} 52.5^{s} −18° 14′ 32″	M2	11.272	112.6740±0.0241	
SCR J0630-7643	A	28.951±0.024	Mensa	06^{h} 30^{m} 46.6^{s} −76° 43′ 09″	M6.0		112.6584±0.0934	
SCR J0630-7643	B	28.951±0.024	Mensa	06^{h} 30^{m} 46.6^{s} −76° 43′ 09″	M		112.6584±0.0934	
DENIS 0334-49 (LEHPM 3396)		28.963±0.014	Horologium	03^{h} 34^{m} 12.2^{s} −49° 53′ 32″	M9V		112.6100±0.0557	
2MASS 0727+1710§		28.99±0.23	Gemini	07^{h} 27^{m} 18.2^{s} +17° 10′ 01″	T7		112.5±0.9	
Gamma Leporis	A$	29.0004±0.0058	Lepus	05^{h} 44^{m} 27.8^{s} −22° 26′ 54″	F6V	3.59#	112.4661±0.0225	
Gamma Leporis	B (AK Leporis)$	29.0004±0.0058	Lepus	05^{h} 44^{m} 27.8^{s} −22° 26′ 54″	K2V	6.17#	112.4661±0.0225	
WISE1810§		29.03^{+2.28}_{−1.95}	Serpens	18^{h} 10^{m} 06.18^{s} −10° 10′ 00.5″	esdT8-esdT9		112.5+8.1 −8.0	closest extreme metal-poor brown dwarf
GJ 2066 (G 113-20)		29.1550±0.0059	Hydra	08^{h} 16^{m} 08.0^{s} +01° 18′ 09″	M2.0V	10.091	111.8698±0.0228	
LHS 224 (G 193-27, GJ 3421)	A	29.43±0.19	Lynx	07^{h} 03^{m} 55.7^{s} +52° 42′ 07″	M5.0Ve		110.8263±0.6945	
LHS 224 (G 193-27, GJ 3421)	B	29.43±0.19	Lynx	07^{h} 03^{m} 55.7^{s} +52° 42′ 07″	M		110.8263±0.6945	
SZ Ursae Majoris		29.588±0.0045	Ursa Major	11^{h} 20^{m} 04.8^{s} +65° 50′ 47″	M2V		110.2305±0.0166	
Gliese 433		29.6045±0.0055	Hydra	11^{h} 35^{m} 26.9^{s} −32° 32′ 24″	M2V		110.1711±0.0204	has 3 known planets
Delta Eridani (Rana)$		29.644±0.052	Eridanus	03^{h} 43^{m} 14.9^{s} –09° 45′ 48″	KIV	3.52#	110.0254±0.1944	
Gliese 508 (HD 115953)	Aa	29.65±0.23	Canes Venatici	13^{h} 19^{m} 45.5^{s} +47° 46′ 41″	M2V	8.54	109.9837±0.8292	
Gliese 508 (HD 115953)	Ab	29.65±0.23	Canes Venatici	13^{h} 19^{m} 45.5^{s} +47° 46′ 41″			109.9837±0.8292	
Gliese 508 (HD 115953)	B	29.65±0.23	Canes Venatici	13^{h} 19^{m} 45.5^{s} +47° 46′ 41″			109.9837±0.8292	
GJ 3146 (LP 469-206)		29.664±0.019	Aries	02^{h} 16^{m} 30.0^{s} +13° 35′ 13″	M5.0Ve		109.9500±0.0704	
LHS 1126 (GJ 2012, EGGR 246)‡		29.6701±0.0055	Cetus	00^{h} 41^{m} 26.0^{s} −22° 21′ 02″	DQ9		109.9276±0.0202	
V374 Pegasi		29.6898±0.0070	Pegasus	22^{h} 01^{m} 13.1^{s} +28° 18′ 25″	M3.5Ve		109.8548±0.0259	
2MASSI J0652307+471034§		29.714±0.076	Auriga	06^{h} 52^{m} 30.7^{s} +47° 10′ 35″	L4.5		109.7651±0.2782	
WT 460	A	29.723±0.063	Centaurus	14^{h} 11^{m} 59.9^{s} −41° 32′ 22″	M5.5e		109.7323±0.2316	
WT 460	B	29.723±0.063	Centaurus	14^{h} 11^{m} 59.9^{s} −41° 32′ 22″			109.7323±0.2316	
Gliese 283 (L 745-46)	A (LP 783-3, LAWD 25)‡	29.8285±0.0049	Puppis	07^{h} 40^{m} 20.8^{s} −17° 24′ 49″	DAZ6	13.061	109.3440±0.0181	
Gliese 283 (L 745-46)	B (LP 783-2)	29.8285±0.0049	Puppis	07^{h} 40^{m} 20.8^{s} −17° 24′ 49″	M6.5V	16.696	109.3440±0.0181	
WISE 0713−2917§		29.84±0.58	Canis Major	07^{h} 13^{m} 22.6^{s} −29° 17′ 52″	Y0		109.3±2.1	
2MASS J03552337+1133437§		29.88±0.13	Taurus	03^{h} 55^{m} 23.4^{s} +11° 33′ 44″	L5γ		109.1381±0.4833	
WISEP J213456.73-713743.6§		29.90±1.05	Indus	21^{h} 34^{m} 56.7^{s} −71° 37′ 45″	T9pec		109.1±3.7	
Groombridge 1830 (CF Ursae Majoris, HD 103095)$		29.9145±0.0054	Ursa Major	11^{h} 52^{m} 58.8^{s} +37° 43′ 07″	G8VIp	6.42#	109.0296±0.0197	
GJ 3801 (Ross 1015)		29.980±0.012	Canes Venatici	13^{h} 42^{m} 43.3^{s} +33° 17′ 24″	M4V	13.896	108.7903±0.0440	
Beta Comae Berenices$		29.998±0.045	Coma Berenices*	13^{h} 11^{m} 52.4^{s} +27° 52′ 41″	G0V	4.23#	108.7250±0.1645	
System	Star or (sub-) brown dwarf	Distance (ly)	Constellation	Coordinates: RA, Dec (Ep J2000, Eq J2000)	Stellar class	Apparent magnitude (V)	Parallax (mas)	Notes and additional references

== See also ==
- List of nearest stars
- List of star systems within 20–25 light-years
- List of star systems within 30–35 light-years
- Lists of stars
- List of nearest bright stars
- Spherical shell
