= Wolf 489 =

Star in the constellation Virgo

Observation data Epoch J2000 Equinox J2000
- Constellation: Virgo
- Right ascension: 13^{h} 36^{m} 31.85^{s}
- Declination: +03° 40′ 45.9″
- Apparent magnitude (V): 14.66

Characteristics
- Evolutionary stage: white dwarf
- Spectral type: DZ10.0
- Apparent magnitude (B): 15.59
- Apparent magnitude (V): 14.63
- Apparent magnitude (R): 14.0
- Apparent magnitude (I): 14.1
- Apparent magnitude (J): 13.06
- Apparent magnitude (H): 12.82
- Apparent magnitude (K): 12.69

Astrometry
Proper motion (μ)	RA: −3735.839 mas/yr Dec.: −1113.581 mas/yr
Parallax (π)	119.7566±0.0304 mas
Distance	27.235 ± 0.007 ly (8.350 ± 0.002 pc)
Absolute magnitude (M_{V})	15.04

Details
Mass	0.55±0.03 M_{☉}
Radius	0.013 (Note: From surface gravity and mass.) R_{☉}
Luminosity	0.000095 L_{☉}
Surface gravity (log g)	7.95±0.02 cgs
Temperature	5,030±120 K
Age	5.19 (Note: White dwarf cooling age, i. e. age as degenerate star (not including lifetime as main sequence star and as giant star)) Gyr

Other designations
- WD 1334+039, Wolf 489, Gliese 518, LHS 46, LFT 1023, LTT 13961, NLTT 34618, G 062-053, G 62-53, G 64-4, EGGR 100, 2MASS J13363181+0340458, USNO-B1.0 0936-00229354

Database references
SIMBAD	data

Wolf 489 (WD 1334+039, LHS 46, G 062-053, Gliese 518) is a nearby degenerate star (white dwarf) of spectral class DZ10.0), the single known component of the system, located in the constellation Virgo.

== Distance ==
Wolf 489, probably, is the 12th closest white dwarf, or, possibly, 9th–14th (see Gliese 293, GJ 1087, Gliese 915, GJ 1276 and Gliese 318). Its trigonometric parallax from YPC (Yale Parallax Catalog) is 121.4 ± 3.4 mas, corresponding to a distance 8.24 ± 0.23 pc, or 26.87 ± 0.75 ly.

Wolf 489 parallax data
Source	Parallax, mas	Distance, pc	Distance, ly
Woolley (1970)	135±12	7.4±0.7	24.2±2.1
GJ, 3rd version	122.2±3.9	8.18±0.26	26.69±0.85
YPC, 4th edition	121.4±3.4	8.24±0.23	26.87±0.75
Gaia DR3, 2023	119.7566±0.0304	8.3503±0.0002	27.235±0.007

== Physical parameters ==
Wolf 489's mass is 0.55 ± 0.03 Solar masses, its surface gravity is 10^{7.95 ± 0.02} (8.91 · 10^{7}) cm·s^{−2}, or approximately 91 000 of Earth's, corresponding to a radius 9089 km, or 143% of Earth's.

Wolf 489's temperature is 5030 ± 120 K (comparable with that of early K-type main sequence stars); its cooling age, i. e. age as degenerate star (not including lifetime as main sequence star and as giant star) is 5.19 Gyr. Wolf 489 should appear white with a slight shade of yellow, nearly the same color as a K-type main sequence star.

== See also ==
- List of star systems within 25–30 light-years
