= Gliese 877 =

Red dwarf star in the constellation Octans

Observation data Epoch J2000.0 Equinox ICRS
- Constellation: Octans
- Right ascension: 22^{h} 55^{m} 45.513^{s}
- Declination: −75° 27′ 31.20″
- Apparent magnitude (V): 10.377

Characteristics
- Spectral type: M3V

Astrometry
Radial velocity (R_{v})	+65.52±0.13 km/s
Proper motion (μ)	RA: −1,026.203 mas/yr Dec.: −1,059.407 mas/yr
Parallax (π)	116.3134±0.0168 mas
Distance	28.041 ± 0.004 ly (8.597 ± 0.001 pc)
Absolute magnitude (M_{V})	10.700 ± 0.0240

Details
Radius	0.442 ± 0.040 R_{☉}
Temperature	3467 ± 100 K
Rotational velocity (v sin i)	0.95 km/s

Other designations
- GJ 877, HIP 113229, L 49-19, LHS 531

Database references
SIMBAD	data

Gliese 877 (GJ 877 / HIP 113229 / LHS 531) is a red dwarf star located in the southern constellation of Octans, near the boundary with Indus. At a distance of 28.04 light-years (8.60 parsecs), it is the nearest star in Octans. Known stars close to it are β Hydri and ζ Tucanae, respectively 4.5 and 6.2 light years.

Gliese 877's bolometric luminosity is just 2.3% of the Sun's. It shines with an apparent magnitude of +10.22, so it cannot be seen with the naked eye. Nevertheless, it is considerably brighter than other red dwarfs, such as Proxima Centauri, the closest red dwarf to the Solar System; in particular, it is almost 14 times more luminous than Proxima. Of spectral type M3V, its effective temperature is 3390 K. It does not appear to be a variable star.

== See also ==
- List of star systems within 25–30 light-years
