= 2MASS J03552337+1133437 =

Brown dwarf in the constellation Taurus

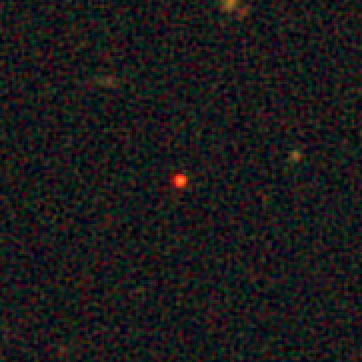
- 2MASS J0355+11; Credit: SDSS

Observation data Epoch J2000 Equinox J2000
- Constellation: Taurus
- Right ascension: 03^{h} 55^{m} 23.374^{s}
- Declination: +11° 33′ 43.80″

Characteristics
- Evolutionary stage: brown dwarf
- Spectral type: L5γ
- Apparent magnitude (G): 19.5831
- Apparent magnitude (J): 14.05
- Apparent magnitude (H): 12.53
- Apparent magnitude (K): 11.526
- J−H colour index: 1.52
- J−K colour index: 2.52

Astrometry
Radial velocity (R_{v})	11.92 km/s
Proper motion (μ)	RA: 223.182 mas/yr Dec.: -631.303 mas/yr
Parallax (π)	109.1381±0.4833 mas
Distance	29.9 ± 0.1 ly (9.16 ± 0.04 pc)

Details
Mass	30.3±6.8 M_{Jup}
Radius	1.21±0.08 R_{Jup}
Luminosity	(8.47±0.12)×10^{−5} L_{☉}
Surface gravity (log g)	4.71±0.17 cgs
Temperature	1,573±51 K
Age	133+15 −20 Myr

Other designations
- EPIC 210327027, 2MASS J03552337+1133437, WISEA J035523.53+113337.2, BNA 3

Database references
SIMBAD	data

2MASS J03552337+1133437 (2MASS J0355+11) is a nearby brown dwarf of spectral type L5γ, located in the constellation Taurus at approximately 29.9 light-years from Earth.

== Characteristics ==
2MASS J0355+11 was discovered in 2006 by Reid et al. It is young, has a low surface gravity of 10^{4.71} cgs and a red spectral energy distribution compared to field brown dwarfs. It belongs to the AB Doradus moving group, which is 133 million years old. At this age it would have a mass of about 31 M_{J} and a radius of 1.21 R_{J}. Its bolometric luminosity is of 8.47×10^{−5} L_{☉}, which together with its radius, implies an effective temperature of 1,573 K. It has a very red color thought to be caused by photospheric dust.

A study with James Webb Space Telescope's MIRI instrument found silicate features that are shifted to bluer wavelengths compared to other brown dwarfs in the same sample. The researchers found a 10% flux difference in the mid-infrared between JWST and Spitzer spectra. But it is not clear if this is due systematic uncertainties between the instruments or real variability. Multiple MIRI observations are needed to confirm this variability.

It is a radio-quiet brown dwarf, indicating an absence of stellar flares. Its carbon to oxygen ratio, equal to 0.56, is similar to that of the Sun.

A 2010 search for companions to L dwarfs identified this object as a candidate binary system.

The interstellar comet 2I/Borisov passed 1.4 light-years (0.44 parsecs) from 2MASS J0355+11 280 thousand years before arriving in the Solar System.

== See also ==
- List of star systems within 25–30 light-years
