= TW Piscis Austrini =

Star in the constellation Piscis Austrinus

- Location of TW Piscis Austrini (circled)

Observation data Epoch J2000 Equinox J2000
- Constellation: Piscis Austrinus
- Right ascension: 22^{h} 56^{m} 24.05256^{s}
- Declination: −31° 33′ 56.0306″
- Apparent magnitude (V): 6.44–6.51

Characteristics
- Evolutionary stage: main sequence
- Spectral type: K5Vp
- U−B color index: 1.02
- B−V color index: 1.10
- Variable type: BY Draconis

Astrometry
Radial velocity (R_{v})	+6.79±0.12 km/s
Proper motion (μ)	RA: 330.203 mas/yr Dec.: −158.602 mas/yr
Parallax (π)	131.5525±0.0275 mas
Distance	24.793 ± 0.005 ly (7.602 ± 0.002 pc)
Absolute magnitude (M_{V})	7.08

Orbit
Primary	Fomalhaut
Name	TW Piscis Austrini
Period (P)	5.8+3.8 −2.2 × 10^{6} yr
Semi-major axis (a)	4.5+1.8 −1.2 × 10^{4} AU
Inclination (i)	65+30 −29°

Details
Mass	0.73+0.02 −0.01 M_{☉}
Radius	0.688±0.034 R_{☉}
Luminosity	0.189±0.013 L_{☉}
Temperature	4,594±80 K
Metallicity [Fe/H]	−0.07±0.03 dex
Rotation	10.3 days
Rotational velocity (v sin i)	2.93 km/s
Age	440±40 Myr

Other designations
- Fomalhaut B, TW PsA, CD−32°17321, CPD−32°6550, GJ 879, HD 216803, HIP 113283, HR 8721, SAO 214197, LTT 9283, PLX 5562.00

Database references
SIMBAD	data
ARICNS	data

TW Piscis Austrini (also known as Fomalhaut B) is a main sequence star in the constellation Piscis Austrinus. It lies relatively close to the Sun, at an estimated distance of 24.8 light-years (7.6 parsecs). To an observer on Earth the star is visually separated from its larger companion Fomalhaut (A) by 2 degrees—the width of four full moons.

== Stellar properties ==
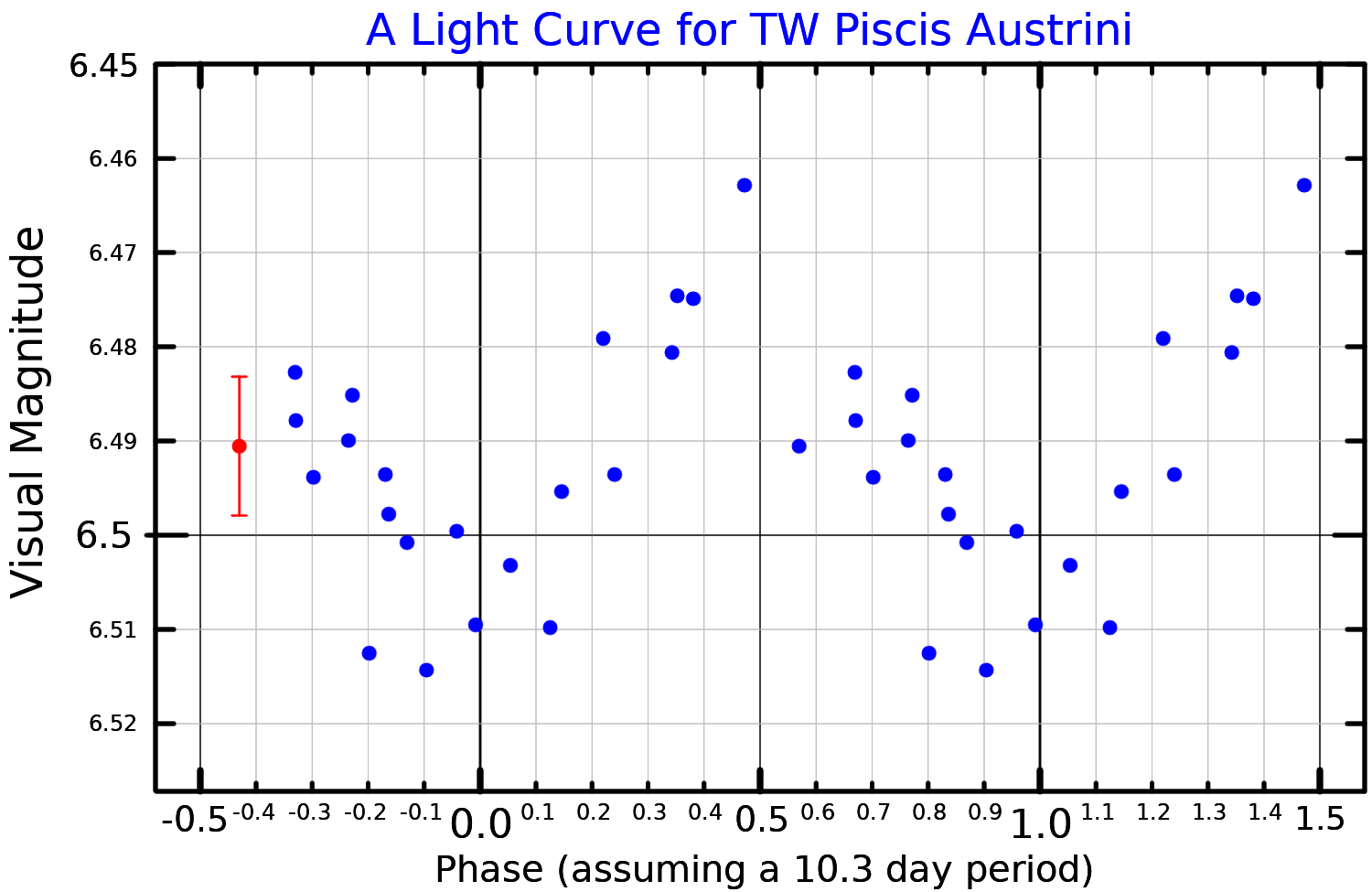
A visual band light curve for TW Piscis Austrini, adapted from Busko and Torres (1978). The error bar shown on the left-most point applies to all points.

The name TW Piscis Austrini is a variable star designation. This is a variable star of the type known as a BY Draconis variable, with surface brightness variations causing the changes as the star rotates. It varies slightly in apparent magnitude, ranging from 6.44 to 6.51 over a 10.3-day period.

TW Piscis Austrini lies within a light-year of Fomalhaut. Due to sharing the same proper motion, and the same estimated age of approximately 440 ± 40 million years, astronomers now consider them to be elements of a multiple star system. A third star, dimmer and more widely separated, Fomalhaut C, gives the system the widest visual separation, to observers from Earth, at approximately 6 degrees.

== Planetary system ==
In 2019, an exoplanet candidate around Fomalhaut B was detected by astrometry, but this remains unconfirmed.

The Fomalhaut B planetary system
Companion (in order from star)	Mass	Semimajor axis (AU)	Orbital period (years)	Eccentricity	Inclination (°)	Radius
b (unconfirmed)	1.2+0.7 −0.6 M_{J}	—	25+52 −21	—	—	—

== See also ==
- List of nearest K-type stars
