= Gliese 686 =

Star in the Hercules constellation

Observation data Epoch J2000 Equinox ICRS
- Constellation: Hercules
- Right ascension: 17^{h} 37^{m} 53.347^{s}
- Declination: +18° 35′ 30.16″
- Apparent magnitude (V): 9.577

Characteristics
- Spectral type: M1.0V
- B−V color index: 1.530±0.015

Astrometry
Radial velocity (R_{v})	−9.55±0.1 km/s
Proper motion (μ)	RA: 926.638 mas/yr Dec.: 984.455 mas/yr
Parallax (π)	122.5546±0.0176 mas
Distance	26.613 ± 0.004 ly (8.160 ± 0.001 pc)
Absolute magnitude (M_{V})	10.08

Details
Mass	0.426±0.017 M_{☉}
Radius	0.427±0.013 R_{☉}
Luminosity	0.0295±0.0007 L_{☉}
Surface gravity (log g)	4.87±0.07 cgs
Temperature	3,656±51 K
Metallicity [Fe/H]	−0.23±0.16 dex
Rotation	38.732±0.286 d
Rotational velocity (v sin i)	2.49 km/s

Other designations
- BD+18 3421, HIP 86287, G 170-55, LHS 452, 2MASS J17375330+1835295

Database references
SIMBAD	data
Exoplanet Archive	data
ARICNS	data

Gliese 686 (GJ 686 / HIP 86287 / LHS 452) is a star in the constellation of Hercules, with an apparent magnitude +9.577. Although it is close to the Solar System – at 26.6 light-years – it is not the closest known star in its constellation, since Gliese 661 is 20.9 light years away. The closest system to this star is the bright μ Herculis, at 4.5 light years. They are followed by GJ 1230 and Gliese 673, at 7.2 and 7.6 light years respectively.

Gliese 686 is one of the many red dwarfs in the Solar System neighborhood with a spectral type of M1V, and has an effective temperature of about 3600 K. Its brightness in the visible spectrum is equal to 0.82% of that of the Sun, while its total luminosity is equivalent to 2.7% that of the Sun, since a significant amount of the radiation emitted by these stars is infrared invisible light. Considering only this last parameter, Gliese 686 is considerably brighter than other known red dwarfs: it is 6.5 times more luminous than Ross 154 and 15 times more than Proxima Centauri, the closest star to the Solar System.

Gliese 686 has a radius approximately half that of the Sun. Its projected rotation speed is 2.5 km / s, its rotation period being equal to or less than 10.3 days. It has a metallic content lower than that of the Sun; various studies estimate its index metallicity between -0.25 and -0.44. It has an approximate mass between 45% and 49% of the solar mass and is a star with characteristics comparable to that of Lacaille 9352.

== Planetary system ==
Gliese 686 has one known super-Earth planet detected by radial velocity. It is orbiting close to the host star with a separation of 0.091 AU (13.6 Gm) and an orbital period of 15.5 days. Since the inclination of its orbit is unknown, only a lower bound on its mass can be determined: it has at least 6.6 times the mass of the planet Earth.

The Gliese 686 planetary system
Companion (in order from star)	Mass	Semimajor axis (AU)	Orbital period (days)	Eccentricity	Inclination (°)	Radius
b	≥6.624±0.432 M_{🜨}	0.091±0.001	15.530±0.0011	0.050±0.030	—	—
