= Fomalhaut =

Triple star system in the constellation Piscis Austrinus

- Location of Fomalhaut A, B, C

Observation data Epoch J2000 Equinox ICRS
- Constellation: Piscis Austrinus
- Pronunciation: /ˈfoʊməl.hɔːt/, /foʊməlˈhɔːt/
- Right ascension: 22^{h} 57^{m} 39.0465^{s}
- Declination: −29° 37′ 20.050″
- Apparent magnitude (V): 1.16

Characteristics
- Evolutionary stage: main sequence
- Spectral type: A4V
- U−B color index: 0.08
- B−V color index: 0.09
- Variable type: None

Astrometry
Proper motion (μ)	RA: +328.95 mas/yr Dec.: −164.67 mas/yr
Parallax (π)	129.81±0.47 mas
Distance	25.13 ± 0.09 ly (7.70 ± 0.03 pc)
Absolute magnitude (M_{V})	1.72

Details
Mass	1.92±0.02 M_{☉}
Radius	1.842±0.019 R_{☉}
Luminosity	16.63±0.48 L_{☉}
Surface gravity (log g)	4.21 cgs
Temperature	8,590 K
Metallicity [Fe/H]	−0.03 to −0.34 dex
Rotational velocity (v sin i)	93 km/s
Age	440±40 Myr

Other designations
- Fomalhaut, α Piscis Austrini, α PsA, Alpha PsA, 24 Piscis Austrini, CD−30 19370, CPD−30 6685, FK5 867, GJ 881, HD 216956, HIP 113368, HR 8728, SAO 191524

Database references
SIMBAD	data
Exoplanet Archive	data
ARICNS	data

Fomalhaut (UK: /ˈfɒməloʊt/, US: /ˈfoʊməlhɔːt/) is the brightest star in the southern constellation of Piscis Austrinus, the Southern Fish, and one of the brightest stars in the night sky. It has the Bayer designation Alpha Piscis Austrini, which is an alternative form of α Piscis Austrini, and is abbreviated Alpha PsA or α PsA. This is a class A star on the main sequence approximately 25 light-years (7.7 pc) from the Sun as measured by the Hipparcos astrometry satellite. Since 1943, the spectrum of this star has served as one of the stable anchor points by which other stars are classified.

It is classified as a Vega-like star that emits excess infrared radiation, indicating it is surrounded by a circumstellar disk.

Together with the K-type main-sequence star TW Piscis Austrini, and the red dwarf star LP 876-10, Fomalhaut constitutes a triple star system, even though the companions are separated by approximately 8 degrees.

Fomalhaut was the first stellar system with an extrasolar planet candidate imaged at visible wavelengths, designated Fomalhaut b. However, analyses in 2019 and 2023 of existing and new observations indicate that Fomalhaut b is not a planet, but rather an expanding region of debris from a massive planetesimal collision.

== Nomenclature ==
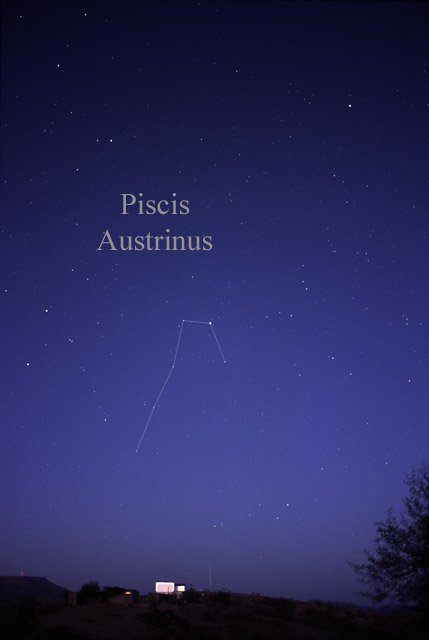
Fomalhaut is the brightest star in the constellation of Piscis Austrinus (center).

α Piscis Austrini, or Alpha Piscis Austrini, is the system's Bayer designation. It also bears the Flamsteed designation of 24 Piscis Austrini. The classical astronomer Ptolemy included it in the constellation of Aquarius, along with the rest of Piscis Austrinus. In the 17th century, Johann Bayer firmly planted it in the primary position of Piscis Austrinus. Following Ptolemy, John Flamsteed in 1725 additionally denoted it 79 Aquarii. The current designation reflects modern consensus on Bayer's decision, that the star belongs in Piscis Austrinus. Under the rules for naming objects in multiple-star systems, the three components – Fomalhaut, TW Piscis Austrini and LP 876-10 – are designated A, B and C, respectively.

The star's traditional name derives from scientific Arabic فم الحوت fam al-ḥūt (al-janūbī) "the mouth of the [Southern] Fish" (literally, "mouth of the whale"), a translation of how Ptolemy labeled it. Fam in Arabic means "mouth", al "the", and ḥūt "fish" or "whale". In 2016, the International Astronomical Union organized a Working Group on Star Names (WGSN) to catalog and standardize proper names for stars. The WGSN's first bulletin of July 2016 included a table of the first two batches of names approved by the WGSN, which included the name "Fomalhaut" for this star.

In July 2014, the International Astronomical Union (IAU) launched NameExoWorlds, a process for giving proper names to certain exoplanets. The process involved public nomination and voting for the new names. In December 2015, the IAU announced "Dagon" as the winning name for Fomalhaut b. The winning name was proposed by Todd Vaccaro and forwarded by the St. Cloud State University Planetarium of St. Cloud, Minnesota, United States of America, to the IAU for consideration. Dagon was a Semitic deity, often represented as half-man, half-fish.

== Observation ==
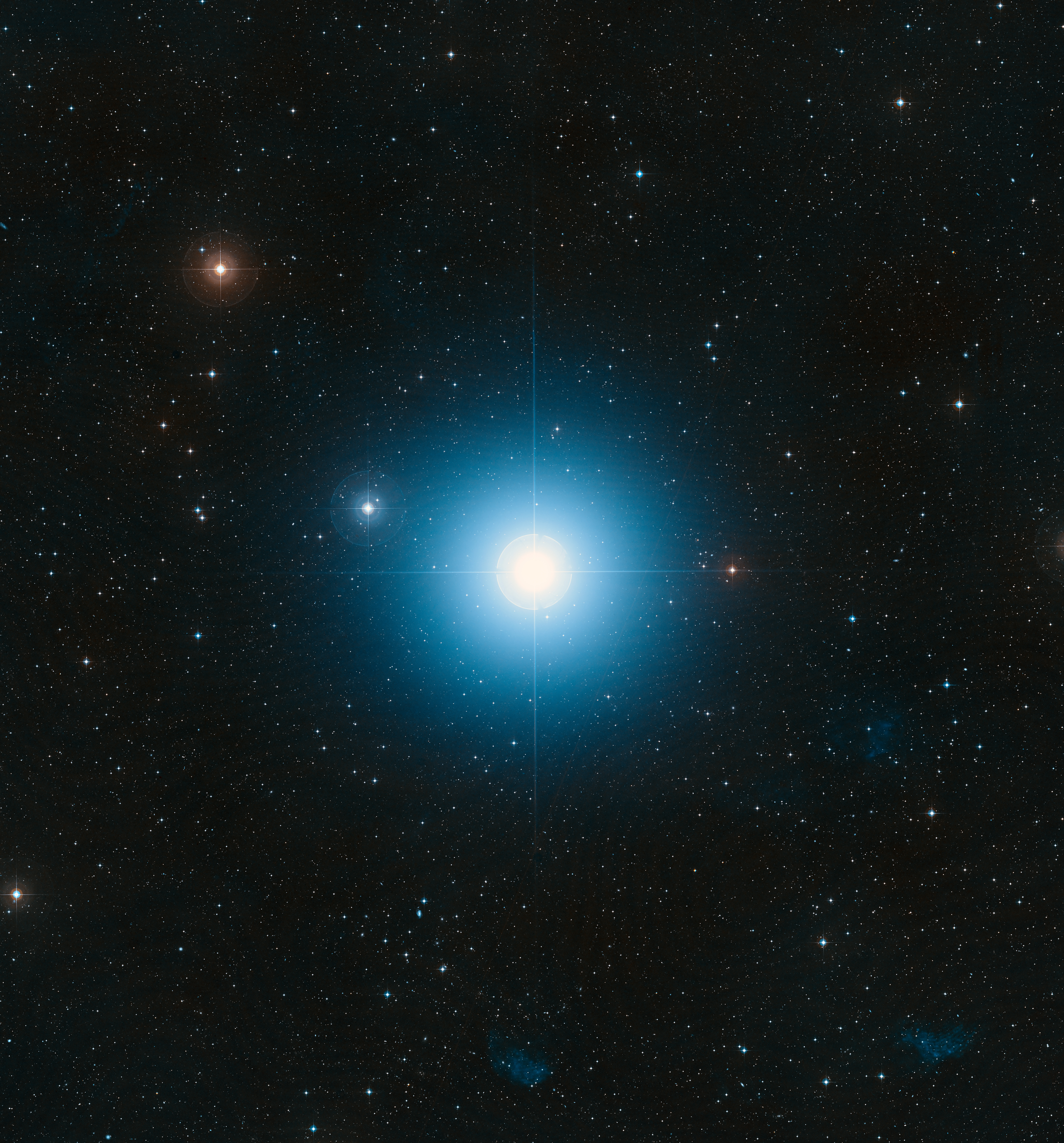
Digitized Sky Survey image of Fomalhaut (field of view 2.7 × 2.9 degrees)

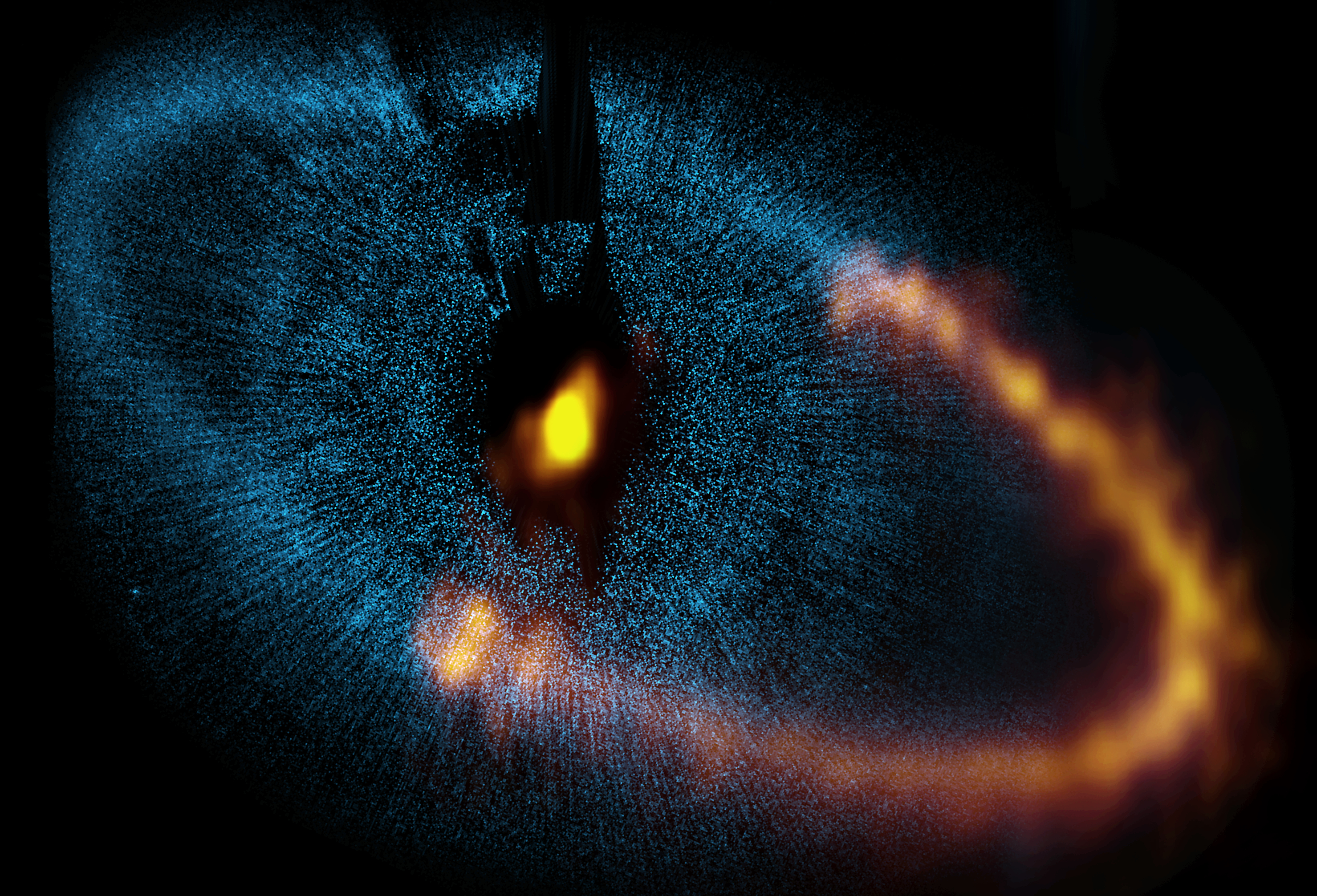
Dust ring around Fomalhaut from the Atacama Large Millimeter/submillimeter Array (ALMA)

At a declination of −29.6°, Fomalhaut is located south of the celestial equator, and hence is best viewed from the Southern Hemisphere. However, its southerly declination is not as great as that of stars such as Acrux, Alpha Centauri and Canopus, meaning that, unlike them, Fomalhaut is visible from a large part of the Northern Hemisphere as well, being best seen in autumn. Its declination is greater than that of Sirius and similar to that of Antares. At 40°N, Fomalhaut rises above the horizon for eight hours and reaches only 20° above the horizon, while Capella, which rises at approximately the same time, will stay above the horizon for twenty hours. Fomalhaut can be located in northern latitudes by the fact that the western (right-hand) side of the Square of Pegasus points to it. Continuing the line from Beta to Alpha Pegasi towards the southern horizon, Fomalhaut is about 45˚ south of Alpha Pegasi, with no bright stars in between.

== Fomalhaut A ==
Fomalhaut is a young star, for many years thought to be only 100 to 300 million years old, with a potential lifespan of a billion years. A 2012 study gave a slightly higher age of 440±40 million years. The surface temperature of the star is around 8,590 K (8,320 °C). Fomalhaut's mass is about 1.92 times that of the Sun, its luminosity is about 16.6 times greater, and its diameter is roughly 1.84 times as large.

Fomalhaut is slightly metal-deficient compared to the Sun, which means it is composed of a smaller percentage of elements other than hydrogen and helium. The metallicity is typically determined by measuring the abundance of iron in the photosphere relative to the abundance of hydrogen. A 1997 spectroscopic study measured a value equal to 93% of the Sun's abundance of iron. (Note: Calculation of metallicity: if m = [Fe/H], then the ratio of iron to hydrogen for Fomalhaut divided by the ratio of iron to hydrogen for the Sun is given by 10^{m}.) A second 1997 study deduced a value of 78%, by assuming Fomalhaut has the same metallicity as the neighboring star TW Piscis Austrini, which has since been argued to be a physical companion. In 2004, a stellar evolutionary model of Fomalhaut yielded a metallicity of 79%. Finally, in 2008, a spectroscopic measurement gave a significantly lower value of 46%.

Fomalhaut has been claimed to be one of approximately 16 stars belonging to the Castor Moving Group. This is an association of stars which share a common motion through space, and have been claimed to be physically associated. Other members of this group include Castor and Vega. The moving group has an estimated age of 200±100 million years and originated from the same location. More recent work has found that purported members of the Castor Moving Group appear to not only have a wide range of ages, but their velocities are too different to have been possibly associated with one another in the distant past. Hence, "membership" in this dynamical group has no bearing on the age of the Fomalhaut system.

=== Debris disks and suspected planets ===
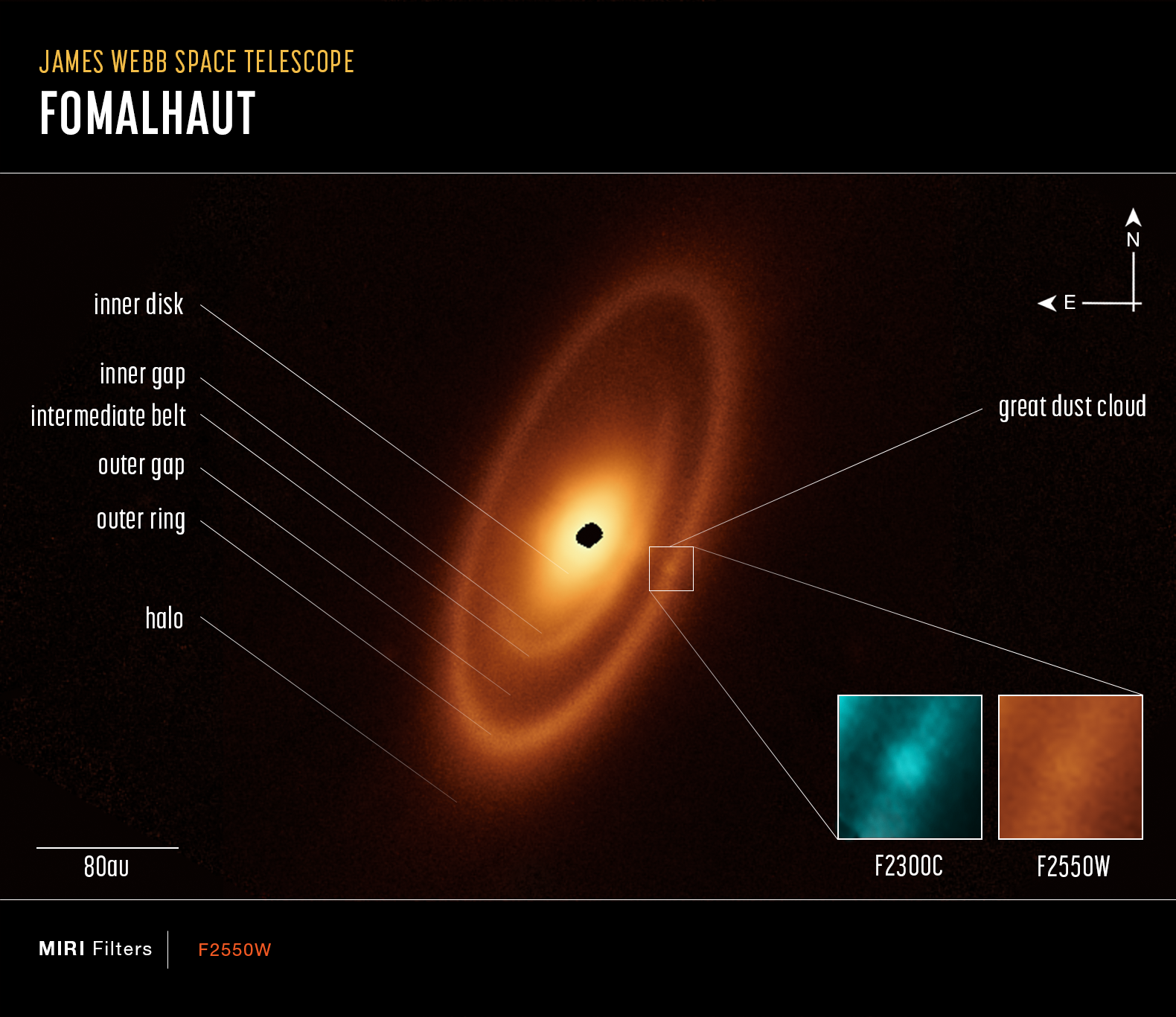
Image of the asteroid belt by the James Webb Space Telescope with annotations by NASA.

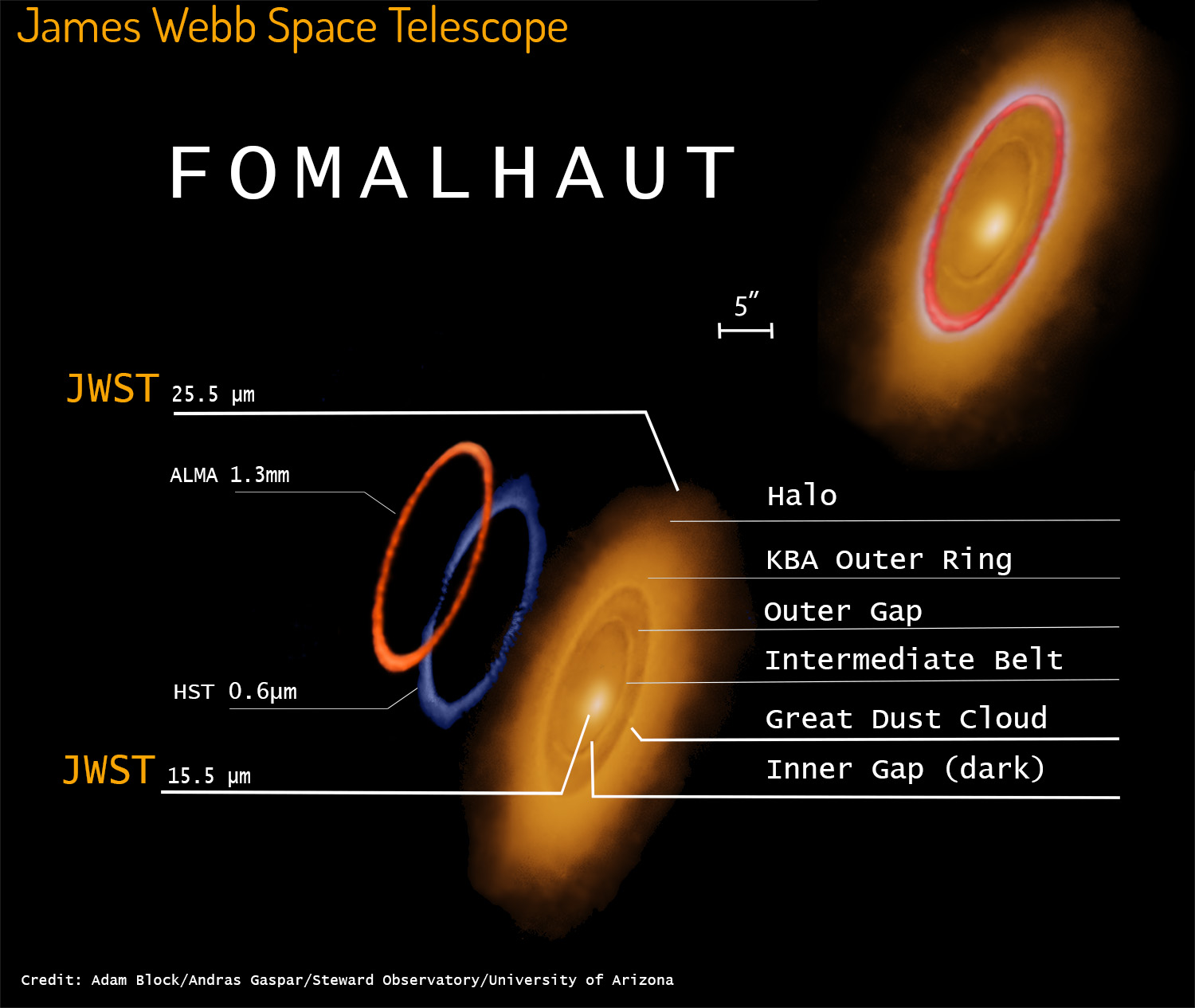
This image shows the discovery features in the debris disk of Fomalhaut from the James Webb Space Telescope (JWST) as well as overlays of Hubble Space Telescope (HST) data and the Atacama Large Millimeter/submillimeter Array (ALMA).

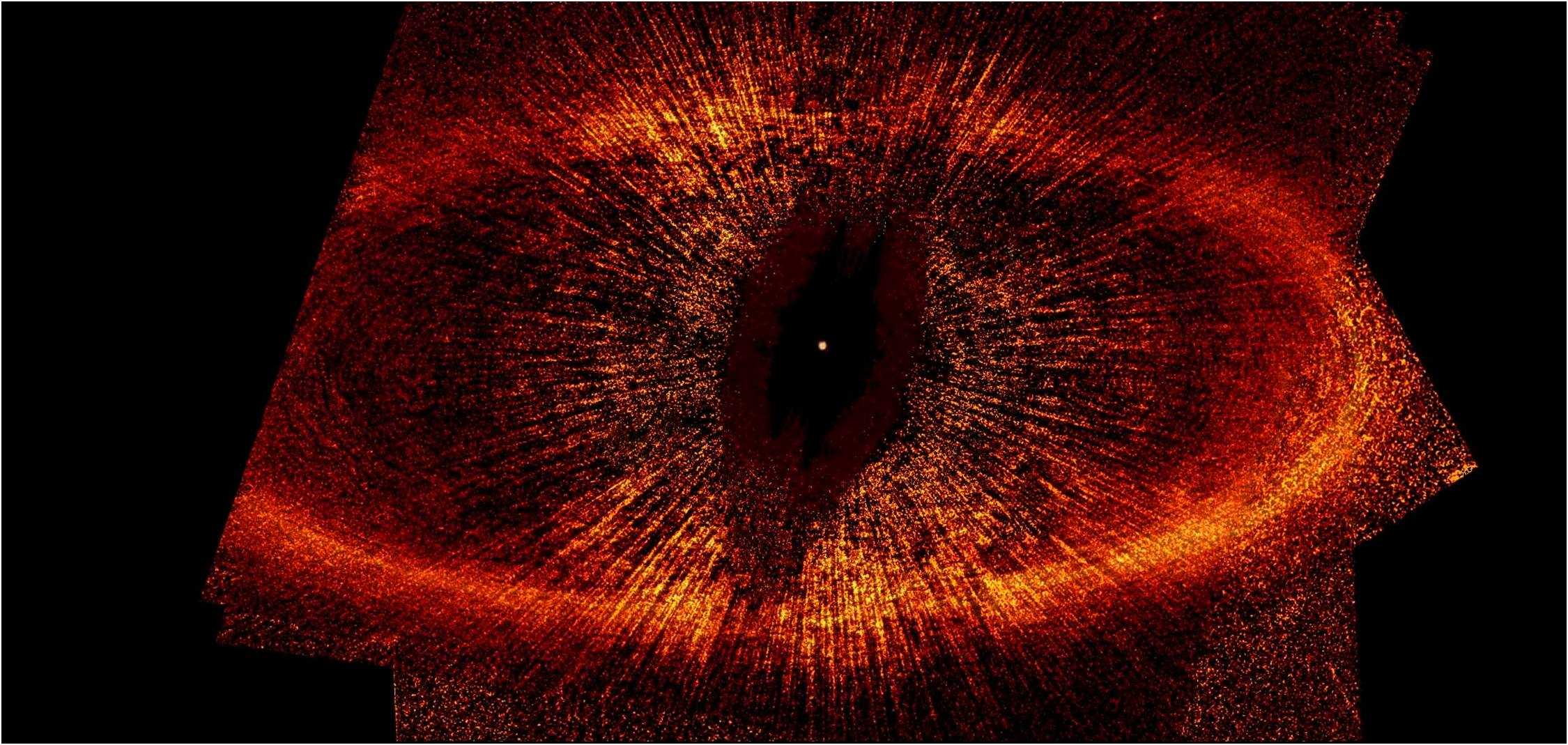
The debris disk around the star

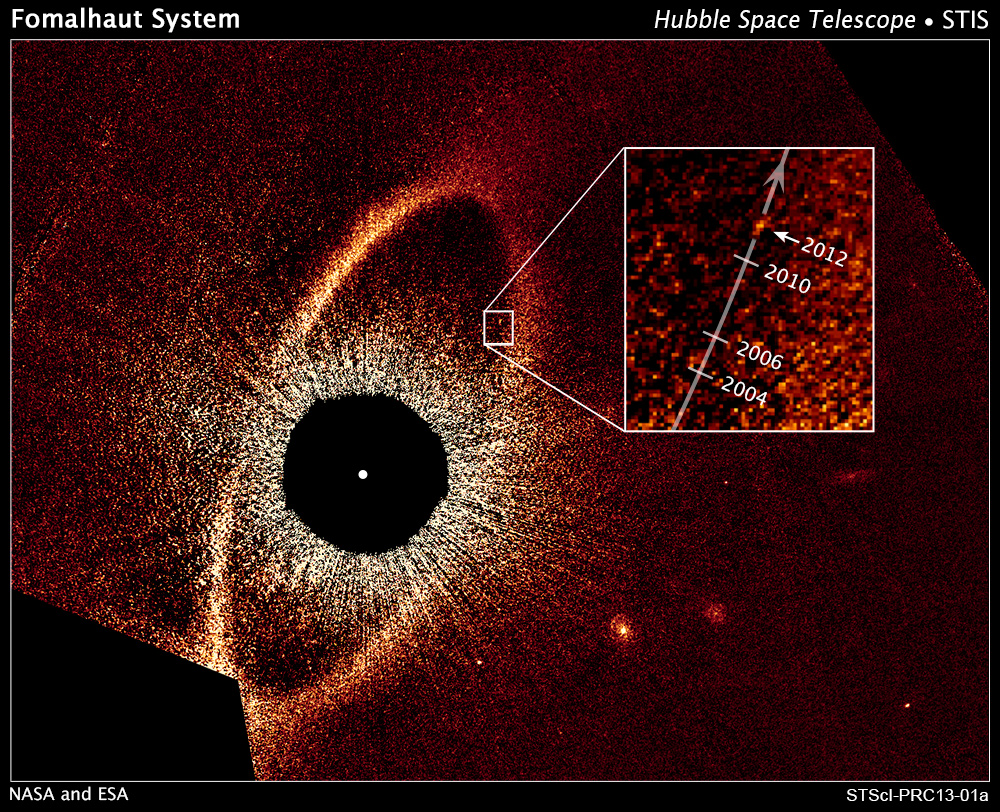
Debris ring around Fomalhaut showing location of Fomalhaut b—imaged by Hubble Space Telescope's coronagraph. (January 8, 2013; North is up, East left) (NASA).

Fomalhaut is surrounded by several debris disks.

The inner disk is a high-carbon small-grain (10–300 nm) ash disk, clustering at 0.1 AU from the star. Next is a disk of larger particles, with inner edge 0.4–1 AU of the star. The innermost disk is unexplained as yet.

The outermost disk is at a radial distance of 133 AU (1.99×10^{10} km; 1.24×10^{10} mi), in a toroidal shape with a very sharp inner edge, all inclined 24 degrees from edge-on. The dust is distributed in a belt about 25 AU wide. The geometric center of the disk is offset by about 15 AU (2.2×10^{9} km; 1.4×10^{9} mi) from Fomalhaut. The disk is sometimes referred to as "Fomalhaut's Kuiper belt". Fomalhaut's dusty disk is believed to be protoplanetary, and emits considerable infrared radiation. Measurements of Fomalhaut's rotation indicate that the disk is located in the star's equatorial plane, as expected from theories of star and planet formation.

Herschel Space Observatory images of Fomalhaut, analysed in 2012, reveal that a large amount of fluffy micrometer-sized dust is present in the outer dust belt. Because such dust is expected to be blown out of the system by stellar radiation pressure on short timescales, its presence indicates a constant replenishment by collisions of planetesimals. The fluffy morphology of the grains suggests a cometary origin. The collision rate is estimated to be approximately 2000 kilometre-sized comets per day. Observations of this outer dust ring by the Atacama Large Millimeter Array also suggested the possible existence of two planets in the system. If there are additional planets from 4 to 10 AU, they must be under 20 M_{J}; if from 2.5 outward, then 20 M_{J}.

On November 13, 2008, astronomers announced an extrasolar planet candidate, orbiting just inside the outer debris ring. This was the first extrasolar orbiting object candidate to be directly imaged in visible light, captured by the Hubble Space Telescope. The mass of the tentative planet, Fomalhaut b, was estimated to be less than three times the mass of Jupiter, and at least the mass of Neptune. However, M-band images taken from the MMT Observatory put strong limits on the existence of gas giants within 40 AU of the star, and Spitzer Space Telescope imaging suggested that the object Fomalhaut b was more likely to be a dust cloud. A later 2019 synthesis of new and existing direct observations of the object confirmed that it is expanding, losing brightness, has not enough mass to detectably perturb the outer ring while crossing it, and is probably a dispersing cloud of debris from a massive planetesimal collision on a hyperbolic orbit destined to leave the Fomalhaut A system. Further 2022 observations with the James Webb Space Telescope in mid-infrared failed to resolve the object in the 25.5 μm MIRI wideband filter wavelength range, reported by the same team to be consistent with the previous result.

The same 2022 JWST imaging data discovered another apparent feature in the outer disk, dubbed the "Great Dust Cloud". However, another team's analysis, which included other existing data, preferred its interpretation as a coincident background object, not part of the outer ring. Another 2023 study detected 10 point sources around Fomalhaut; all but one of these are background objects, including the "Great Dust Cloud", but the nature of the last is unclear. It may be a background object, or a planetary companion to Fomalhaut.

In December of 2025, another major collision was reported to have occurred in the Fomalhaut system, noted to have resembled Fomalhaut b's collision.

The Fomalhaut planetary system
Companion (in order from star)	Mass	Semimajor axis (AU)	Orbital period (days)	Eccentricity	Inclination (°)	Radius
Inner hot disk	0.08–0.11 AU				—	—
Outer hot disk	0.21–0.62 AU or 0.88–1.08 AU				—	—
10 AU belt	8–12 AU				—	—
Interbelt dust disk	35–133 AU				—	—
Main belt	133–158 AU				−66.1°	—
Main belt outer halo	158–209 AU				—	—

== Fomalhaut B (TW Piscis Austrini) ==
Fomalhaut forms a binary star with the K4-type star TW Piscis Austrini (TW PsA), which lies 0.28 parsecs (0.91 light-years) away from Fomalhaut, and its space velocity agrees with that of Fomalhaut within 0.1±0.5 km/s, consistent with being a bound companion. A recent age estimate for TW PsA (400±70 million years) agrees very well with the isochronal age for Fomalhaut (450±40 million years), further arguing for the two stars forming a physical binary.

The designation TW Piscis Austrini is astronomical nomenclature for a variable star. Fomalhaut B is a flare star of the type known as a BY Draconis variable. It varies slightly in apparent magnitude, ranging from 6.44 to 6.49 over a 10.3 day period. While smaller than the Sun, it is relatively large for a flare star. Most flare stars are red M-type dwarfs.

In 2019, a team of researchers analyzing the astrometry, radial velocity measurements, and images of Fomalhaut B suggested the existence of a planet orbiting the star with a mass of 1.2+0.7
−0.6 Jupiter masses, and a poorly defined orbital period with an estimate loosely centering around 25 years.

== Fomalhaut C (LP 876-10) ==
LP 876-10 is also associated with the Fomalhaut system, making it a trinary star. In October 2013, Eric Mamajek and collaborators from the RECONS consortium announced that the previously known high-proper-motion star LP 876-10 had a distance, velocity, and color-magnitude position consistent with being another member of the Fomalhaut system. LP 876-10 was originally catalogued as a high-proper-motion star by Willem Luyten in his 1979 NLTT catalogue; however, a precise trigonometric parallax and radial velocity was only measured quite recently. LP 876-10 is a red dwarf of spectral type M4V, and located even farther from Fomalhaut A than TW PsA—about 5.7° away from Fomalhaut A in the sky, in the neighbouring constellation Aquarius, whereas both Fomalhaut A and TW PsA are located in constellation Piscis Austrinus. Its current separation from Fomalhaut A is about 0.77 parsecs (2.5 light-years), and it is currently located 0.987 parsecs (3.22 light-years) away from TW PsA (Fomalhaut B). LP 876-10 is located well within the tidal radius of the Fomalhaut system, which is 1.9 parsecs (6.2 light-years). Although LP 876-10 is itself catalogued as a binary star in the Washington Double Star Catalog (called "WSI 138"), there was no sign of a close-in stellar companion in the imaging, spectral, or astrometric data in the Mamajek et al. study. In December 2013, Kennedy et al. reported the discovery of a cold dusty debris disk associated with Fomalhaut C, using infrared images from the Herschel Space Observatory. Multiple-star systems hosting multiple debris disks are exceedingly rare.

== Etymology and cultural significance ==
Fomalhaut has had various names ascribed to it through time, and has been recognized by many cultures of the Northern Hemisphere, including the Arabs, Persians, and Chinese. It marked the solstice in 2500 BC. It was also a marker for the worship of Demeter in Eleusis. (Note: "Solitary Fomalhaut guards the southern sky". earthsky.org. Brightest stars. 9 September 2021. "Fomalhaut had first visible exoplanet.", cites R.H. Allen (1963).)

- It is considered to be one of the four "royal stars" of the Persians.
- The Latin names are ōs piscis merīdiāni, ōs piscis merīdionālis, ōs piscis notii "the mouth of the Southern Fish".
- A folk name among the early Arabs was Difdi' al Awwal (الضفدع الأول al-ḍifdiʿ al-awwal) "the first frog" (the second frog is Beta Ceti).
- The Chinese name 北落師門/北落师门 (Mandarin: Běiluòshīmén), meaning Gate of the Northern Military Camp, because this star is marking itself and stands alone in Gate of the Northern Military Camp asterism, Encampment mansion (see: Chinese constellations). Together with the surrounding asterisms, Fomalhaut serves as the main gate of the northern camp. 北落师门 (Běiluòshīmén), westernized into Pi Lo Sze Mun by R.H. Allen.
- To the Moporr Aboriginal people of South Australia, it is a male being called Buunjill. The Wardaman people of the Northern Territory called Fomalhaut Menggen "white cockatoo".

Fomalhaut-Earthwork B, in Mounds State Park near Anderson, Indiana, lines up with the rising of the star Fomalhaut in the fall months, according to the Indiana Department of Natural Resources. In 1980, astronomer Jack Robinson proposed that the rising azimuth of Fomalhaut was marked by cairn placements at both the Bighorn medicine wheel in Wyoming, USA, and the Moose Mountain medicine wheel in Saskatchewan, Canada.

New Scientist magazine termed it the "Great Eye of Sauron", comparing its shape and debris ring to the aforementioned "eye" in the Peter Jackson Lord of the Rings films.

USS Fomalhaut (AK-22) was a United States navy amphibious cargo ship.

== See also ==
- Exoasteroid
- 2M1207
- GJ 758
- HR 8799
- Direct imaging of extrasolar planets
- Lists of exoplanets
- List of star systems within 25–30 light-years
