= HU Delphini =

Star in the constellation Delphinus

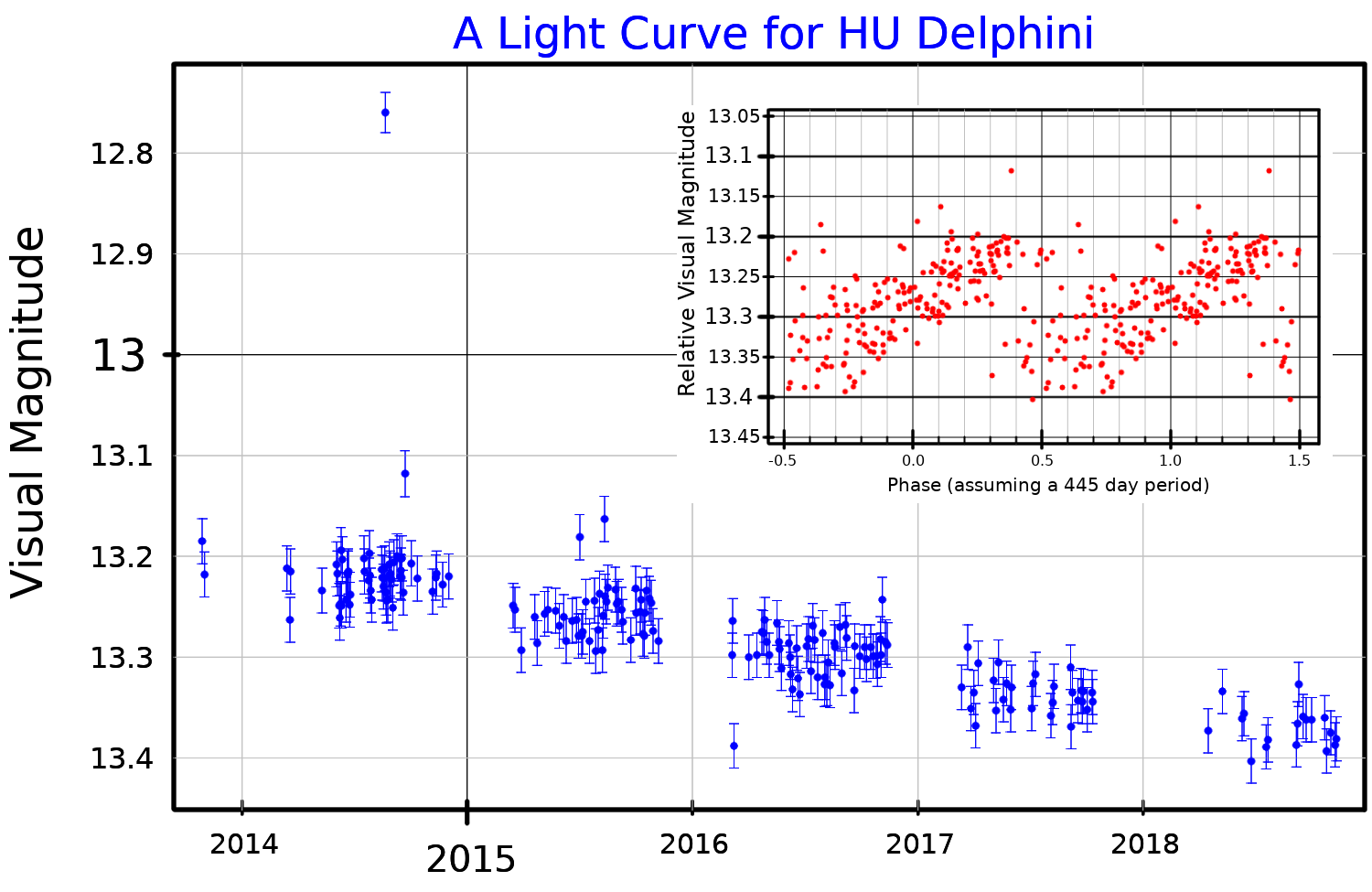
- A visual band light curve for HU Delphini, plotted from ASAS-SN data. The main plot shows the long-term variability, and the inset plot shows the periodic variability.

Observation data Epoch J2000 Equinox J2000
- Constellation: Delphinus
- Right ascension: 20^{h} 29^{m} 48.344^{s}
- Declination: +09° 41′ 20.25″
- Apparent magnitude (V): 13.07

Characteristics
- Spectral type: M4.5V
- U−B color index: +1.29
- B−V color index: +1.64
- Variable type: Flare star

Astrometry
Radial velocity (R_{v})	-34.24 ± 0.07 km/s
Proper motion (μ)	RA: 673.1 mas/yr Dec.: 122.0 mas/yr
Parallax (π)	113.4±0.2 mas
Distance	28.76 ± 0.05 ly (8.82 ± 0.02 pc)
Absolute magnitude (M_{V})	13.46 / 16.73

Orbit
Period (P)	1.47080±0.00031 yr
Semi-major axis (a)	0.0971±0.0006″
Eccentricity (e)	0.6232±0.0059
Inclination (i)	162±3°
Longitude of the node (Ω)	282±2°
Periastron epoch (T)	2019.1567±0.0033
Argument of periastron (ω) (secondary)	9.6±2.3°
Semi-amplitude (K_{1}) (primary)	5.66±0.61 km/s
Semi-amplitude (K_{2}) (secondary)	11.15±0.63 km/s

Details

HU Del A
Mass	0.237 ± 0.004 M_{☉}
Metallicity [Fe/H]	0.07 dex
Rotation	0.3085±0.0005 days
Rotational velocity (v sin i)	35.1±0.2 km/s

HU Del B
Mass	0.114 ± 0.002 M_{☉}

Other designations
- HU Del, GJ 791.2, CCDM J20298+0941AB, LHS 3556, 2MASS J20294834+0941202, G 24-16

Database references
SIMBAD	data
ARICNS	A
- B

HU Delphini, also known as Gliese 791.2, is a star system in the constellation of Delphinus. Its apparent magnitude is 13.07. With a trigonometric parallax of 113.4 ± 0.2 mas, it is about 28.76 light-years (8.82 parsecs) away from the Solar System.

HU Delphini is a binary star with a well-defined period of 1.47080 years and a somewhat high eccentricity of 0.6232. The orbit has been determined from imaging and radial velocity.

Both stars in the system are red dwarfs. The primary component of the system is only 23.7% as massive as the Sun, so it is fully convective. As a result, there are frequent starspots on its surface, especially near poles. While the normal surface temperature of the primary is 3000 K, the starspots themselves are slightly cooler, at about 2700 K. It is also a flare star, the first flare been detected in August 2000. The secondary star has a mass of 11.4% that of the Sun.

== See also ==
- List of star systems within 25–30 light-years
