= UGPS J0521+3640 =

Brown dwarf in the constellation Auriga

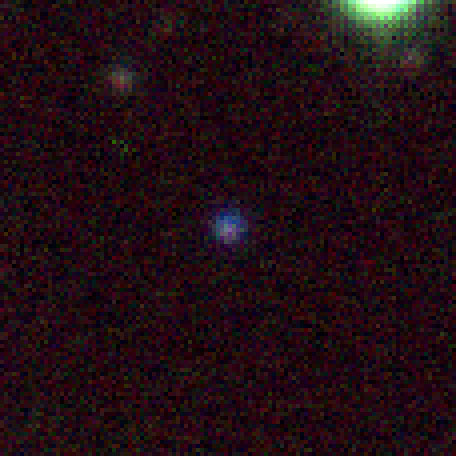
- UGPS J0521+3640; Credit: UKIDSS

Observation data Epoch 2007.82 Equinox J2000
- Constellation: Auriga
- Right ascension: 05^{h} 21^{m} 27.27^{s}
- Declination: +36° 40′ 48.6″

Characteristics
- Spectral type: T8.5
- Apparent magnitude (J (UKIDSS filter system)): 16.94 ± 0.02
- Apparent magnitude (H (UKIDSS filter system)): 17.28 ± 0.04
- Apparent magnitude (K (UKIDSS filter system)): 17.32 ± 0.09

Astrometry
| Proper motion (μ) | RA: 569.0±0.9 mas/yr Dec.: −1511.0±1.0 mas/yr |
| Parallax (π) | 122.2±1.6 mas |
| Distance | 26.7 ± 0.3 ly (8.2 ± 0.1 pc) |

Details
| Mass | 14–32 M_{Jup} |
| Radius | 0.8–1.0 R_{Jup} |
| Surface gravity (log g) | 4.5–5.0 cgs |
| Temperature | 600–650 K |

Database references
| SIMBAD | data |

UGPS J0521+3640 is a nearby brown dwarf of spectral class T8.5, located in the constellation Auriga. It was discovered in 2011 using United Kingdom Infrared Telescope (UKIRT), UKIRT Infrared Deep Sky Survey (UKIDSS), UGPS (UKIDSS Galactic Plane Survey) component, 6th data release.

Its photometric distance estimate is 8.2^{+1.2}_{−1.0} pc, or 26.7^{+3.9}_{−3.3} ly. Based on its parallax measured in 2019, its distance is 26.7 ± 0.3 light-years (8.186 ± 0.092 parsecs).

== See also ==
- List of star systems within 25–30 light-years
