= 2MASS J00361617+1821104 =

Star in the constellation Pisces

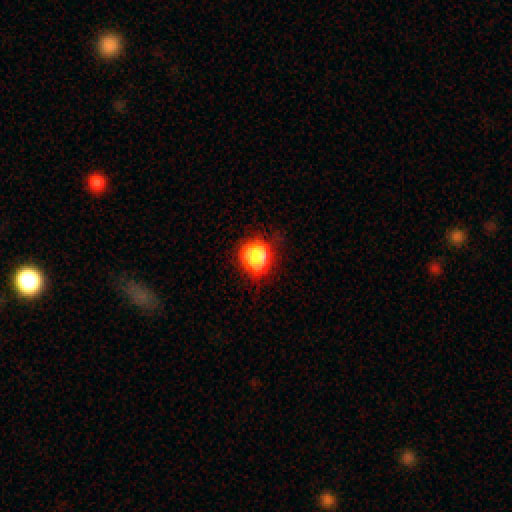
- 2MASS J0036+1821; Credit: legacy surveys

Observation data Epoch J2000 Equinox ICRS
- Constellation: Pisces
- Right ascension: 00^{h} 36^{m} 16.112^{s}
- Declination: +18° 21′ 10.29″
- Apparent magnitude (V): 21.33±0.06

Characteristics
- Evolutionary stage: Brown dwarf
- Spectral type: L3.5
- Apparent magnitude (J): 12.44
- Apparent magnitude (H): 11.58
- Apparent magnitude (K): 11.03
- B−V color index: 1.7±0.2

Astrometry
Radial velocity (R_{v})	+21.7±3.0 km/s
Proper motion (μ)	RA: +901.582 mas/yr Dec.: +124.354 mas/yr
Parallax (π)	114.4735±0.1381 mas
Distance	28.49 ± 0.03 ly (8.74 ± 0.01 pc)

Details
Mass	66.07±12.98 M_{Jup}
Radius	1.01±0.07 R_{Jup}
Surface gravity (log g)	5.21±0.17 cgs
Temperature	1869±64 K
Rotation	3.07941±0.00020 h

Other designations
- LSPM J0036+1821, 2MASS J00361617+1821104

Database references
SIMBAD	data

2MASS J00361617+1821104 (also designated LSPM J0036+1821) is a brown dwarf, located 28.5 light-years from Earth in the constellation Pisces. It was discovered in 2000 by I. Neill Reid et al. Kinematically, it does not belong to any known moving group, being grouped with other "field stars".

2MASS 0036+1821 is of spectral type L3.5, the surface temperature is 1300–2000 Kelvin. As with other brown dwarfs of spectral type L, its spectrum is dominated of metal hydrides and alkali metals. Its position shifts due to its proper motion by 0.9071 arcseconds per year.

The surface of 2MASS 0036+1821 is completely covered by clouds, although cloud deck appear to be thin (less than ten optical depths). Because of unusually rapid rotation, it is possessing a strong magnetic field over 1000 G at the photosphere level, and is well known for its radio emissions.

2MASS 0036+1821 is likely a binary separated by 0.4 astronomical units. Assuming an age of 0.5–5 billion years, the A component has a mass estimate of 51–76 M_{J} and the B component has a mass estimate of 47–74 M_{J}.

A Jupiter-like aurora has been detected at radio wavelengths.

== See also ==
- List of star systems within 25–30 light-years
