= Gliese 673 =

Star in the constellation Ophiuchus

- Location of Gliese 673 in the constellation Ophiuchus

Observation data Epoch J2000 Equinox ICRS
- Constellation: Ophiuchus
- Right ascension: 17^{h} 25^{m} 45.23243^{s}
- Declination: +02° 06′ 41.1237″
- Apparent magnitude (V): 7.492

Characteristics
- Spectral type: K7V
- U−B color index: 1.261
- B−V color index: 1.373

Astrometry
Radial velocity (R_{v})	−23.87±0.12 km/s
Proper motion (μ)	RA: −580.325 mas/yr Dec.: −1,184.737 mas/yr
Parallax (π)	129.6459±0.0175 mas
Distance	25.157 ± 0.003 ly (7.713 ± 0.001 pc)
Absolute magnitude (M_{V})	8.06

Details
Radius	0.564±0.068 R_{☉}
Surface gravity (log g)	4.70 cgs
Temperature	4,030 K
Metallicity [Fe/H]	−0.20 dex
Rotation	11.94 days
Age	205±21 Myr

Other designations
- BD+02 3312, GJ 673, HD 157881, HIP 85295, SAO 122374, LHS 447, LTT 15175, PLX 3955.00, Wolf 718, MCC 794

Database references
SIMBAD	data

Gliese 673 is an orange dwarf star in the constellation Ophiuchus. It has a stellar classification of K7V. Main sequence stars with this spectra have a mass in the range of 60–70% of solar mass (M_{☉}) (comparable to the members of the binary star system 61 Cygni).

This star is relatively near the Sun at a distance of 25.2 light-years. In spite of this proximity, however, it is still too faint to be viewed by the unaided eye. It is considered a slowly rotating star with a relatively high proper motion.

Gliese 673 is among nearby K-type stars of a type in a 'sweet spot' between Sun-analog stars and M stars, in terms of the likelihood of life and its ease of detectability (in this case for planets in the system's outer conservative habitable zone), per analysis of Giada Arney from NASA's Goddard Space Flight Center.

== See also ==
- List of star systems within 25–30 light-years
