= Wolf 922 =

Spectroscopic binary in constellation Capricornus

- Location of Wolf 922 (circled)

Observation data Epoch J2000 Equinox J2000
- Constellation: Capricornus
- Right ascension: 21^{h} 31^{m} 18.57^{s}
- Declination: −09° 47′ 26.5″
- Apparent magnitude (V): 11.96 – 11.99; A: 12.66; B: 14.76

Characteristics
- Spectral type: M4.0V + M
- U−B color index: 1.231
- B−V color index: 1.664
- J−H color index: 0.615
- J−K color index: 0.937
- Variable type: BY Draconis variable

Astrometry
Radial velocity (R_{v})	−56.3336±0.0188 km/s
Proper motion (μ)	RA: 1246.510 mas/yr Dec.: −61.066 mas/yr
Parallax (π)	125.3±0.3 mas
Distance	26.03 ± 0.06 ly (7.98 ± 0.02 pc)
Absolute magnitude (M_{V})	12.6

Orbit
Primary	Wolf 922 A
Companion	Wolf 922 B
Period (P)	704.9±0.5 d
Semi-major axis (a)	0.1448±0.0005″
Eccentricity (e)	0.390±0.002
Inclination (i)	49.8±0.4°
Longitude of the node (Ω)	326.1±0.4°
Periastron epoch (T)	51164.0±1.1
Argument of periastron (ω) (secondary)	8.7±0.5°
Semi-amplitude (K_{1}) (primary)	5.21±0.02 km/s
Semi-amplitude (K_{2}) (secondary)	9.4±0.1 km/s

Details

Wolf 922 A
Mass	0.270±0.004 M_{☉}
Radius	0.3 R_{☉}
Metallicity [Fe/H]	0.3 dex
Rotational velocity (v sin i)	10 km/s

Wolf 922 B
Mass	0.145±0.002 M_{☉}

Other designations
- BB Cap, NSV 13753, Gaia DR3 6894054664842632448, GJ 831, HIP 106255, CCDM J21313-0947AB, WDS J21313-0947AB, Ci 20 1288, G 26-7, LFT 1639, LHS 511, LPM 786, LTT 8556, NLTT 51428, PLX 5184, PM J21313-0947, PM 21286-1001, Wolf 922, TIC 71600113, TYC 5790-1233-1, GCRV 26194, GCRV 72228, GSC 05790-00182, 2MASS J21311859-0947263, WISEA J213119.47-094727.0

Database references
SIMBAD	data

Wolf 922, also designated Gliese 831, is a nearby binary star composed of two low-mass red dwarfs in the zodiac constellation of Capricornus, close to the border with Aquarius. It has an apparent magnitude that varies between 11.96 and 11.99, far too faint to be seen by the naked eye from Earth but observable using a telescope with an aperture of 51 millimetres (2.0 in) or larger. It is located approximately 26 light-years (8.0 pc) distant based on parallax measurements, and approaching the Solar System at a heliocentric radial velocity of −56.33 km/s.

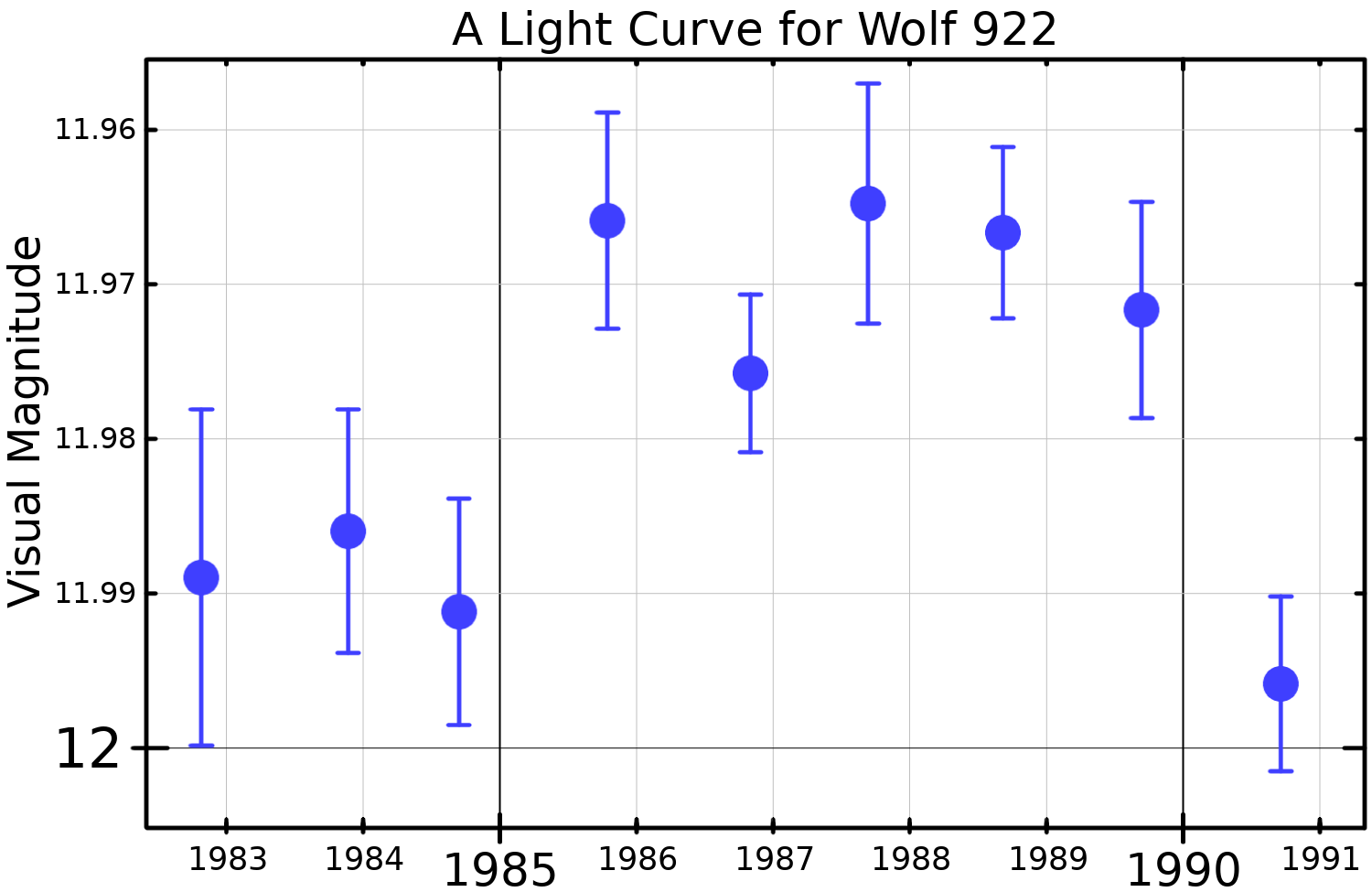
A visual band light curve for Wolf 922, adapted from Weis (1994)

In 1994, it was discovered to show long-term variations in brightness by Edward W. Weis at the Van Vleck Observatory. It was given the variable-star designation BB Capricorni and classified as a BY Draconis variable in 1997.

== Observational history ==
As early as 1960, the star was suspected of experiencing perturbations and a period of about 1,500 days (4.1 years) was suggested. It was subsequently examined by Sarah Lee Lippincott, who, in 1979, determined that the perturbing companion star had a mass of between 0.13 and 0.20 M_{☉}, and that it orbited the primary in a moderately eccentric (eccentricity 0.36) 1.93-year orbit. A 1987 paper proposed a circular (eccentricity 0.0) orbit with a period of 1.92 years, but a study in 2016 gives a 704.9-day (1.930-year) period and an eccentricity of 0.39, close to Lippincott's figures.

In 1997, the discovery of a third star was tentatively announced, which was described as a likely flare star with a very small mass (0.11 M_{☉}) and luminosity, either located very close to A or B, or farther than about 0.5 arcseconds from the pair. The former possibility was ruled out by a follow-up study in 2000, which stated that if the object exists, it is likely bluer than the two red dwarfs, meaning it could be a white dwarf companion or an unrelated background object.
