= WISE J0005+3737 =

Brown dwarf star in the constellation Andromeda

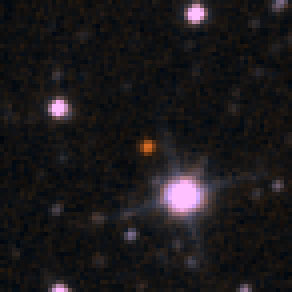
- WISE J0005+3737; Credit: unWISE

Observation data Epoch J2000 Equinox J2000
- Constellation: Andromeda
- Right ascension: 00^{h} 05^{m} 17.61^{s}
- Declination: +37° 37′ 23.2″

Characteristics
- Spectral type: T9

Astrometry
Proper motion (μ)	RA: +997,3 mas/yr Dec.: −271.6 mas/yr
Parallax (π)	126.9±2.1 mas
Distance	25.7 ± 0.4 ly (7.9 ± 0.1 pc)

Other designations
- WISE J000517.48+373720.5

Database references
SIMBAD	data

WISE J0005+3737, full designation WISE J000517.48+373720.5, is a brown dwarf of spectral class T9, located in constellation Andromeda at approximately 23 light-years from Earth.

== Discovery ==
WISE J0005+3737 was discovered in 2012 by Mace et al. from data, collected by Wide-field Infrared Survey Explorer (WISE) Earth-orbiting satellite — NASA infrared-wavelength 40 cm (16 in) space telescope, which mission lasted from December 2009 to February 2011. The discovery paper was published in March 2013.

== Distance ==
Currently the most accurate distance estimate of WISE J0005+3737 is a trigonometric parallax, published in 2019 by Kirkpatrick et al.: 7.9+0.2
−0.1 pc, or 25.7+0.5
−0.5 ly.
