= LP 71-82 =

Red dwarf star in the constellation Draco

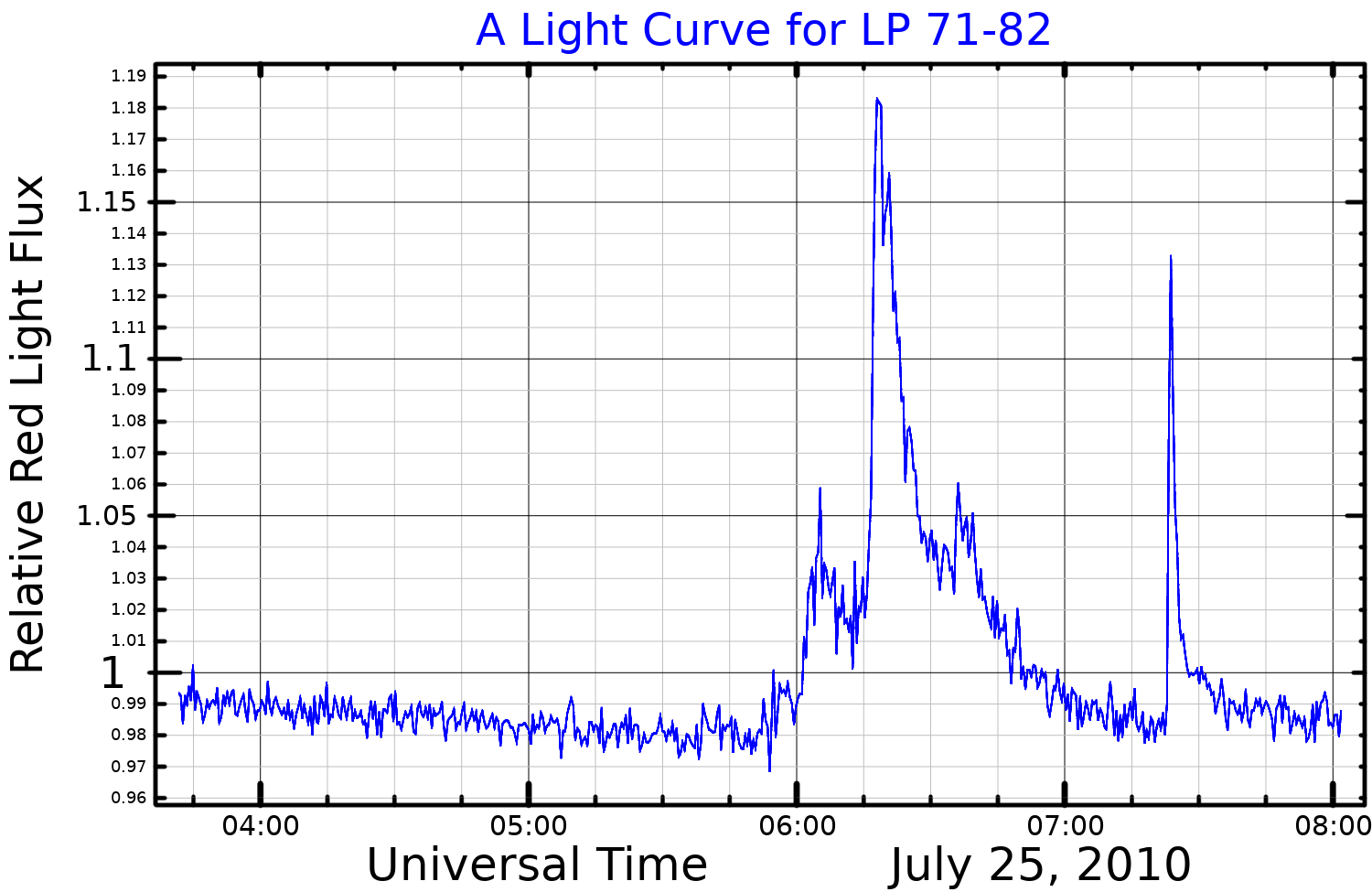
- An R band light curve for LP 71-82 showing flares, adapted from Baran et al. (2013)

Observation data Epoch J2000.0 Equinox J2000.0
- Constellation: Draco
- Right ascension: 18^{h} 02^{m} 16.60^{s}
- Declination: 64° 15′ 44.6″
- Apparent magnitude (V): 13.51

Characteristics
- Spectral type: M5.0V
- Apparent magnitude (J): 8.54

Astrometry
Proper motion (μ)	RA: 196.394 mas/yr Dec.: -383.789 mas/yr
Parallax (π)	128.3057±0.0319 mas
Distance	25.420 ± 0.006 ly (7.794 ± 0.002 pc)

Details
Mass	0.16±0.01 M_{☉}
Radius	0.195±0.002 R_{☉}
Luminosity	0.0033±0.0003 L_{☉}
Habitable zone inner limit	0.06
Habitable zone outer limit	0.12
Surface gravity (log g)	4.5 cgs
Temperature	3124±51 K
Rotation	0.28018±0.000010 d
Rotational velocity (v sin i)	11.3±1.5 km/s
Age	0.5^{+1.1}_{−0.34} Gyr

Other designations
- G 227-22, LP 71-82, LSPM J1802+6415, NLTT 45873, GSC 04209-01465, 2MASS J18021660+6415445, Gaia DR2 2161121135533953536

Database references
SIMBAD	data

LP 71-82 is a red dwarf star, located in constellation Draco at 25.42 light-years (7.79 parsecs) from Earth. Kinematically, it is probably belongs to the Ursa Major Moving Group.

LP 71-82 is a flare star with a very strong activity, with at least four flares detected by 2019. Such activity is expected for a star with a short rotational period of just 6 hours. As a low mass star, it is fully convective. It is visible nearly pole-on, with rotational axis deflected from the Sun by 19±3° degrees. The star has a magnetic fields in chromosphere in 3.8-4.7 kilogauss range.

Multiplicity surveys did not find any stellar companions to LP 71-82 as in 2014.
