= WD 2359−434 =

White dwarf star in the constellation Phoenix

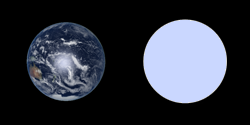
- Size of WD 2359−434 in comparison with Earth. On the left is Earth, on the right is WD 2359-434.

Observation data Epoch J2000 Equinox J2000
- Constellation: Phoenix
- Right ascension: 00^{h} 02^{m} 10.72420^{s}
- Declination: −43° 09′ 55.3906″
- Apparent magnitude (V): 12.76

Characteristics
- Spectral type: DAP5.8
- Apparent magnitude (B): 13.12
- Apparent magnitude (V): 12.76
- Apparent magnitude (R_{KC}): 12.82
- Apparent magnitude (I_{KC}): 12.66
- Apparent magnitude (J): 12.60 ± 0.03
- Apparent magnitude (H): 12.43 ± 0.02
- Apparent magnitude (K_{S}): 12.45 ± 0.02

Astrometry
Radial velocity (R_{v})	-58.8 ± 10.8 km/s
Proper motion (μ)	RA: 613.785 mas/yr Dec.: -686.989 mas/yr
Parallax (π)	120.0143±0.0215 mas
Distance	27.176 ± 0.005 ly (8.332 ± 0.001 pc)
Absolute magnitude (M_{V})	13.39±0.03

Details
Mass	0.83±0.02 M_{☉}
Radius	0.0097±0.0001 R_{☉}
Luminosity	4.37+0.42 −0.38×10^{−4} L_{☉}
Surface gravity (log g)	8.37±0.02 cgs
Temperature	8,506±122 K
Age	1.83±0.18 (Note: White dwarf cooling age, i. e. age as degenerate star (not including lifetime as main sequence star and as giant star).) Gyr

Other designations
- GJ 915, EGGR 165, L 362-81, LAWD 96, LFT 1849, LHS 1005, LP 988-88, LTT 9857, WD 2359-434, 2MASS J00021076-4309560

Database references
SIMBAD	data
- Location of WD 2359−434 in the constellation Phoenix

WD 2359-434 (Gliese 915, LHS 1005, L 362-81) is a nearby degenerate star (white dwarf) of spectral class DAP5.8, the single known component of the system, located in the constellation Phoenix, the nearest star in this constellation.

== Distance ==
Currently, the most accurate distance estimate of WD 2359−434 is a trigonometric parallax from Gaia DR3: 120.0143±0.0215 mas, corresponding to a distance of 8.332±0.001 pc, or 27.176±0.005 ly. WD 2359−434 is the 13th closest white dwarf to the Sun.

== Physical parameters ==
WD 2359−434's mass is 0.85 ± 0.01 Solar masses, its surface gravity is 10^{8.39 ± 0.01} (2.45 · 10^{8}) cm·s^{−2}, or approximately 250,000 of Earth's, corresponding to a radius 6780 km, or 1.06 of Earth's.

WD 2359−434 is relatively hot and young white dwarf, its temperature is 8570 ± 50 K; its cooling age, i. e. age as degenerate star (not including lifetime as main sequence star and as giant star) is 1.82 ± 0.06 Gyr. Gliese 518 should appear bluish-white, due temperature, comparable with that of A-type main sequence stars.

As all white dwarfs, WD 2359−434 is composed of very dense degenerate matter, its mean density is 1,300,000 g·cm^{−3}, (Note: From mass and surface gravity (assuming spherical shape).) i.e. mass of one cubic millimetre of WD 2359−434 matter is 1.3 kg.

Unusually for a white dwarf star, WD 2359-434 has a weak, non-dipole magnetic field of 50,000 - 100,000 Gauss.

== Main sequence progenitor properties ==
As all degenerate stars, WD 2359−434 previously existed initially as main-sequence star and then as giant star, until all the thermonuclear fuel was exhausted, after which WD 2359−434 lost most of its mass. According to the 2010 thesis for the degree of Doctor of Science, using Wood model D initial–final mass relation and WD 2359−434's white dwarf mass value 0.97 ± 0.03 M_{☉} from Holberg et al. 2008, its main sequence progenitor mass was 7.09 M_{☉}. Using expression for pre-white dwarf lifetime 10 · (M_{MS}/M_{☉})^{2.5} (Gyr), was found WD 2359−434 main sequence age 0.07 Gyr.

White dwarf mass value 0.85 ± 0.01 M_{☉} from Subasavage et al. 2009, in Wood model D yields MS (main sequence) mass 6.03 M_{☉}, and MS lifetime 0.11 Gyr, corresponding to B-type main sequence star.

According to initial-final mass relation from Weidemann 2000 paper, WD 2359−434's main sequence progenitor should have mass about 4.6 M_{☉} and lifespan 0.22 Gyr, and, again, should be of B spectral type. There are also other models.

== See also ==
- List of star systems within 25–30 light-years
