= G 99-47 =

Star in the constellation Orion

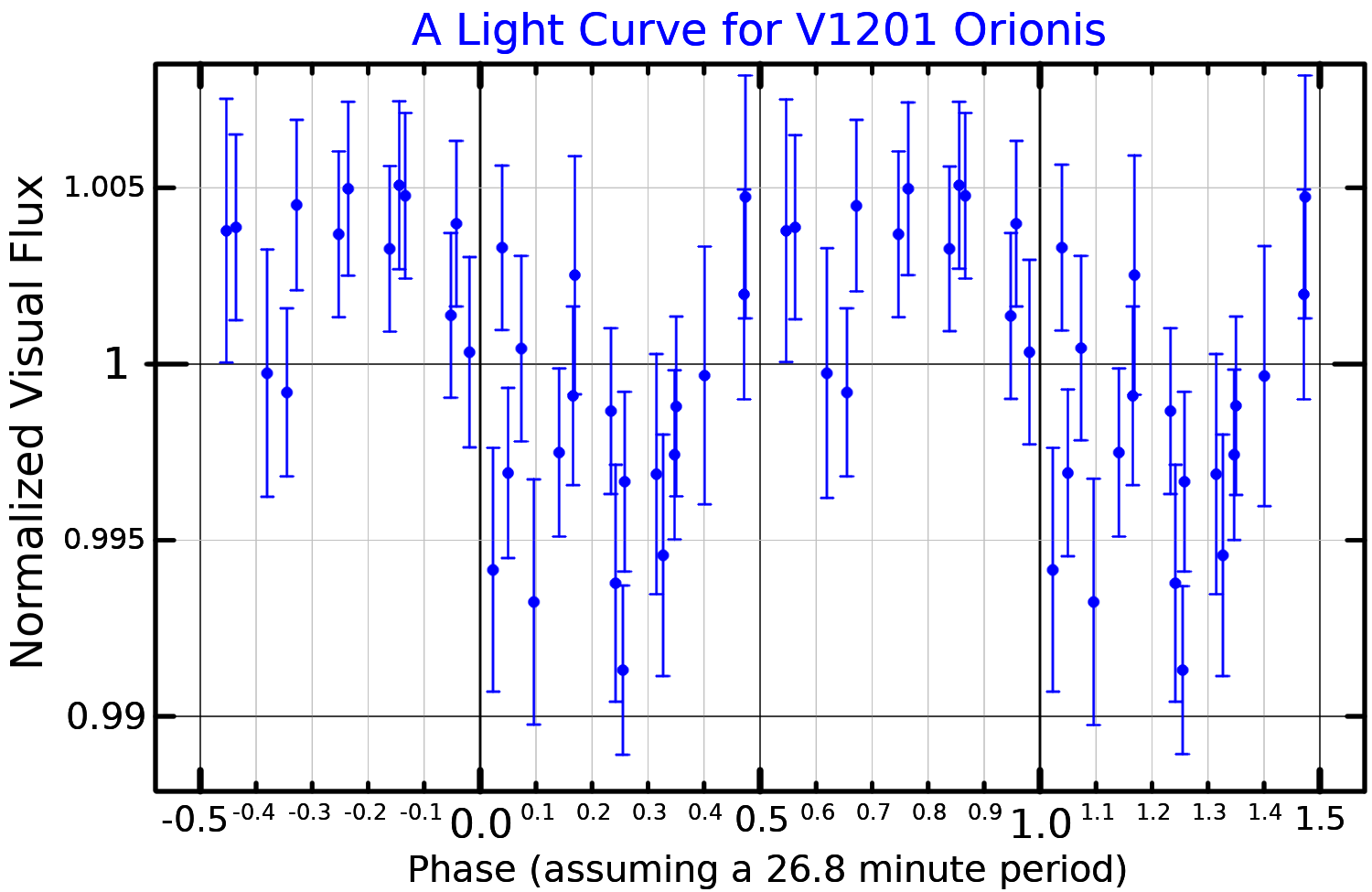
- A visual band light curve for V1201 Orionis, adapted from Brinkworth et al. (2013)

Observation data Epoch J2000 Equinox ICRS
- Constellation: Orion
- Right ascension: 05^{h} 56^{m} 25.45999^{s}
- Declination: +05° 21′ 48.4432″
- Apparent magnitude (V): 14.105

Characteristics
- Spectral type: DAP8.9
- Apparent magnitude (B): 14.69
- Apparent magnitude (V): 14.10
- Apparent magnitude (R): 14.0
- Apparent magnitude (I): 13.6
- Apparent magnitude (J): 12.930 ± 0.022
- Apparent magnitude (H): 12.720 ± 0.025
- Apparent magnitude (K): 12.653 ± 0.024

Astrometry
Radial velocity (R_{v})	−414.02±10.41 km/s
Proper motion (μ)	RA: -444.685 mas/yr Dec.: -925.140 mas/yr
Parallax (π)	123.1989±0.0170 mas
Distance	26.474 ± 0.004 ly (8.117 ± 0.001 pc)
Absolute magnitude (M_{V})	14.59 (Note: From apparent magnitude and parallax.)

Details
Mass	0.71 ± 0.03 M_{☉}
Radius	0.011 (Note: From surface gravity and mass.) R_{☉}
Surface gravity (log g)	8.20 ± 0.05 cgs
Temperature	5790 ± 110 K
Age	3.97 (Note: White dwarf cooling age, i. e. age as degenerate star (not including lifetime as main sequence star and as giant star)) Gyr

Other designations
- V1201 Ori, GJ 1087, EGGR 290, G 99-47, G 102-40, G 106-15, LHS 212, LTT 17891, NLTT 15834, WD 0553+053, 2MASS J05562547+0521486, USNO-B1.0 0953-00073703

Database references
SIMBAD	data

G 99-47 (V1201 Orionis, EGGR 290) is a nearby degenerate star (white dwarf) of spectral class DAP8 (DAP8.9, or DAP8.7), the single known component of the system, located in the constellation Orion. G 99-47 is the 10th-closest known white dwarf, the next closest after LP 658-2 and GJ 3991 B.

The mass of G 99-47 is 0.71±0.03 Solar masses; its surface gravity is 10^{8.20 ± 0.05} (1.58 · 10^{8}) cm·s^{−2}, or approximately 162 000 of Earth's, corresponding to a radius 7711 km, or 121% of Earth's. Its temperature is 5790 ± 110 K, almost like the Sun's; its cooling age, i. e. age as degenerate star (not including lifetime as main sequence star and as giant star) is 3.97 Gyr. Due almost equal to the Sun's temperature, GJ 1087 should appear almost the same white color as the Sun. The white dwarf has a strong magnetic field, with measured vertical component near surface equal to 560 T.

== Close approach to the Sun ==
In about 19,000 years, G 99-47 will have its closest approach to the Sun at a distance of about 2.5 light years.

== See also ==
- List of star systems within 25–30 light-years
