= Gliese 867 =

Star system in the constellation Aquarius

Observation data Epoch J2000 Equinox ICRS
- Constellation: Aquarius
- A
- Right ascension: 22^{h} 38^{m} 45.57462^{s}
- Declination: −20° 37′ 16.0874″
- Apparent magnitude (V): 9.08
- B
- Right ascension: 22^{h} 38^{m} 45.28128^{s}
- Declination: −20° 36′ 51.8102″
- Apparent magnitude (V): 11.49

Characteristics

A
- Evolutionary stage: main sequence
- Spectral type: M2.0V
- Variable type: UV Cet+BY Dra

B
- Evolutionary stage: main sequence
- Spectral type: M3.5V
- Variable type: UV Cet+BY Dra

Astrometry

A
Radial velocity (R_{v})	−8.70±0.69 km/s
Proper motion (μ)	RA: +449.207 mas/yr Dec.: −79.046 mas/yr
Parallax (π)	112.3859±0.0555 mas
Distance	29.02 ± 0.01 ly (8.898 ± 0.004 pc)
Absolute magnitude (M_{V})	9.39

B
Radial velocity (R_{v})	−5.95±3.96 km/s
Proper motion (μ)	RA: +424.590 mas/yr Dec.: −66.983 mas/yr
Parallax (π)	112.9867±0.0387 mas
Distance	28.867 ± 0.010 ly (8.851 ± 0.003 pc)

Orbit
Primary	A
Name	C
Period (P)	4.0831962(29) d
Semi-major axis (a)	0.005607±0.000036" (.04989 AU (Note: Semi-major axis in AU = $\frac{semimajor\ axis\ in\ seconds}{parallax}\ {{=}}\ \frac{.005607}{.1123859}$ = .04989 AU; as the eccentricity is 0.0052, the distance fluctuates between 99.5% and 100.5% of that, roughly from .0496 AU to .0502 AU.))
Eccentricity (e)	0.00520±0.00047
Inclination (i)	51.95±0.42°
Longitude of the node (Ω)	111.64±0.22°
Periastron epoch (T)	2437145.575±0.037 JD
Argument of periastron (ω) (secondary)	307.5±3.0°
Semi-amplitude (K_{1}) (primary)	46.138±0.011 km/s
Semi-amplitude (K_{2}) (secondary)	58.275±0.023 km/s

Orbit
Primary	B
Name	D
Period (P)	1.795±0.017 d
Eccentricity (e)	0 (assumed)
Periastron epoch (T)	2456160.5611±0.0268 JD
Semi-amplitude (K_{1}) (primary)	21.4±0.5 km/s

Details

A
Mass	0.5503±0.0095 M_{☉}
Radius	0.56 R_{☉}
Temperature	3416 K
Metallicity [Fe/H]	0.08 dex
Rotation	4.083 d (Note: The two stars are assumed to be in synchronous rotation, so the rotation period is the same as the orbital period.)
Rotational velocity (v sin i)	5.4±0.6 km/s

C
Mass	0.4357±0.0075 M_{☉}
Radius	0.45 R_{☉}
Rotation	4.083 d
Rotational velocity (v sin i)	4.4±0.6 km/s

B
Mass	0.29±0.06 M_{☉}

D
Mass	≥0.056±0.007 M_{☉}

Other designations
- BD−21 6267, GJ 867, CCDM J22388-2037AB
- A: FK Aqr, CPD−21 8162, HD 214479, HIP 111802, SAO 191294, LTT 9128, NLTT 54421
- B: FL Aqr, L 717-22, LP 876-81, LTT 9127, NLTT 54420

Database references
SIMBAD	A
- B
ARICNS	A
- B

Gliese 867 is a quadruple star system located 29 light-years (8.9 parsecs) away in the constellation Aquarius. It is composed of two binary sub-systems, Gliese 867 A & B, also known by their variable star designations FK Aquarii and FL Aquarii. Gliese 867 is the third-nearest quadruple system, after Gliese 570 and Mu Herculis, and the nearest such system where the primary star is a red dwarf. There are two closer quintuple systems, V1054 Ophiuchi and Xi Ursae Majoris, the former composed entirely of red dwarfs.

== System ==
GJ 867 A (FK Aqr A)
Period = 4.1 d
GJ 867 C (FK Aqr B)
Sep = 216 au
GJ 867 B (FL Aqr A)
Period = 1.8 d
GJ 867 D (FL Aqr B)

Hierarchy of orbits in the Gliese 867 system

Gliese 867 A & B are separated by 24.5 arcseconds, corresponding to a projected distance of 216 AU. Both are spectroscopic binaries. Gliese 867 A & B are both flare stars and BY Draconis variables. They have been known to be flare stars since 1978.

=== Gliese 867 A (FK Aquarii) ===
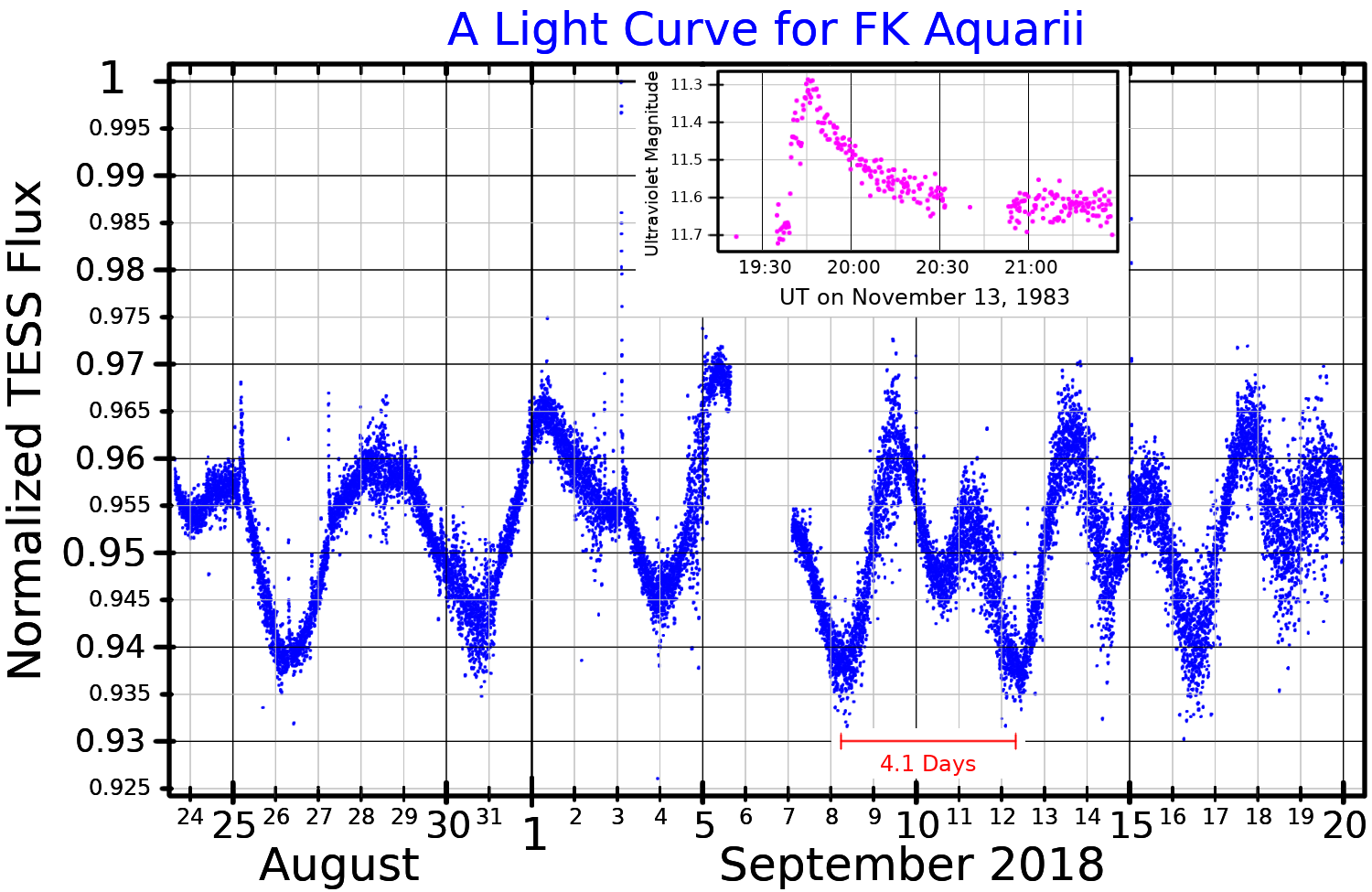
A light curve for FK Aquarii, plotted from TESS data. The binary's orbital period is marked in red. The inset plot, adapted from Byrne et al. (1990), shows a flare.

Gliese 867 A, also known as FK Aquarii, is a close binary orbiting every 4.1 days. The companion star is also called Gliese 867 C. Both stars are red dwarfs around half the mass of the Sun. The system has been known to be a spectroscopic binary since 1965, at that time referred to by its Durchmusterung designation BD−21°6267A. It has also been characterized by astrometry from the Gaia space telescope.

Both stars are magnetically active, and have strong dipolar magnetic fields resembling those found in lower-mass, fully convective red dwarfs. The primary star is the most massive red dwarf known to host this type of magnetic field as of 2024.

=== Gliese 867 B (FL Aquarii) ===
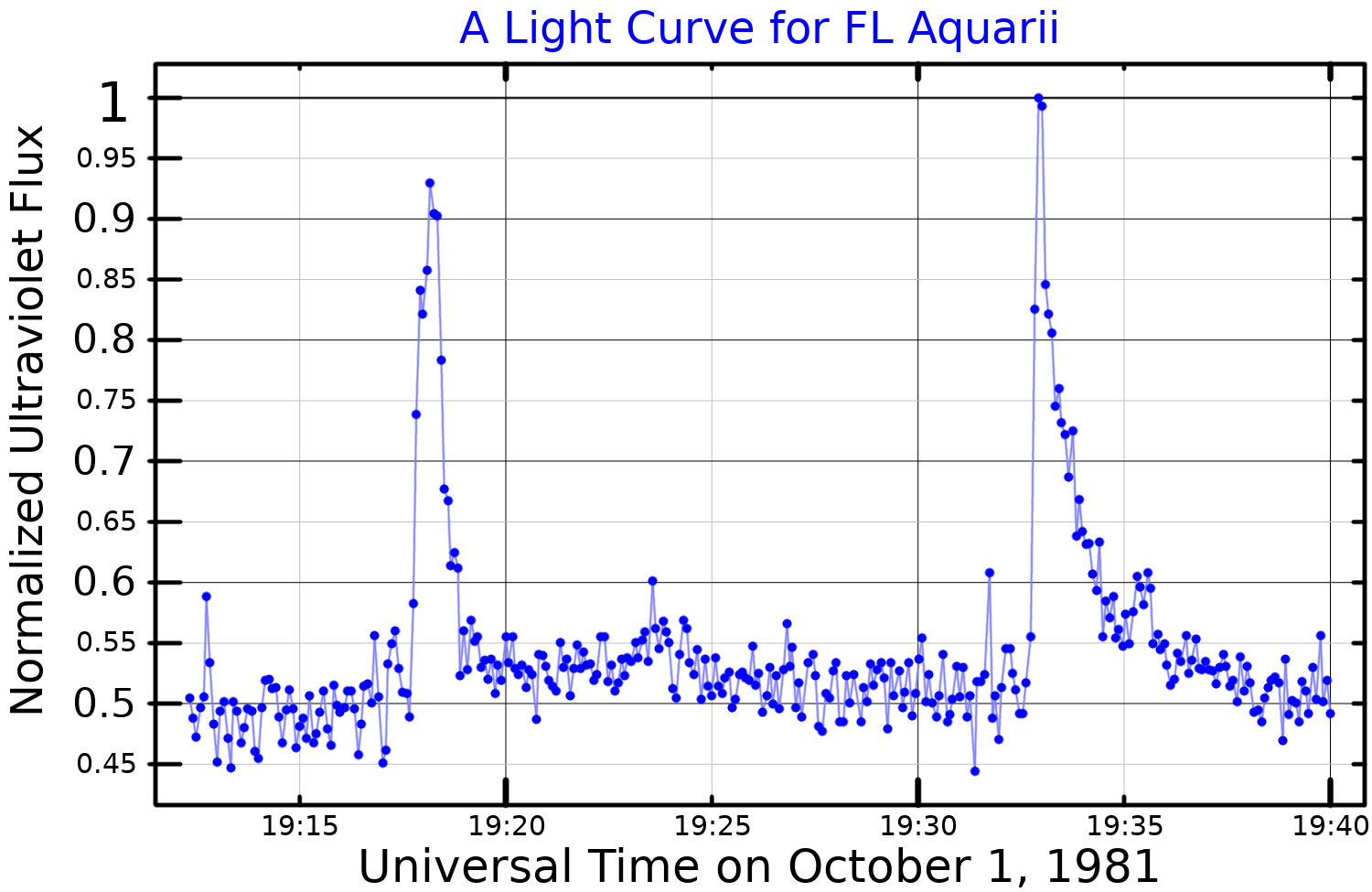
A light curve showing flares on FL Aquarii, adapted from Doyle et al. (1986)

Gliese 867 B, also known as FL Aquarii, is a close binary orbiting every 1.8 days. It was found to be a spectrosopic binary in 2014. The primary star is a red dwarf, while the companion, Gliese 867 D, has a minimum mass of only 61±7 Jupiter masses, and so may be a brown dwarf.

== See also ==
- EZ Aquarii
- Gliese 876
