= Fomalhaut C =

Star in the constellation Aquarius

Fomalhaut C (LP 876-10)
- Debris disk around Fomalhaut C from the REASONS survey

Observation data Epoch J2000 Equinox ICRS
- Constellation: Aquarius
- Right ascension: 22^{h} 48^{m} 04.49285^{s}
- Declination: −24° 22′ 07.7178″
- Apparent magnitude (V): 12.624

Characteristics
- Spectral type: M4V

Astrometry
Radial velocity (R_{v})	5.77±0.58 km/s
Proper motion (μ)	RA: 331.609 mas/yr Dec.: −183.805 mas/yr
Parallax (π)	130.2707±0.0325 mas
Distance	25.037 ± 0.006 ly (7.676 ± 0.002 pc)
Absolute magnitude (M_{V})	13.21 ± 0.02

Details
Mass	0.18±0.02 M_{☉}
Radius	0.23 ± 0.01 (Note: Radius calculated with temperature and luminosity) R_{☉}
Luminosity	0.004603 L_{☉}
Temperature	3,132±65 K
Metallicity [Fe/H]	−0.1 dex
Rotation	0.466 days

Other designations
- Fomalhaut C, α PsA C, LP 876-10, NLTT 54872, WDS J22577-2937C, 2MASS J22480446-2422075, Gaia DR2 6623351805412369024
- Location of Fomalhaut C in the constellation Aquarius

Database references
SIMBAD	data

Fomalhaut C, also designated LP 876-10, is the distant third star of the Fomalhaut system. It is about five degrees from Fomalhaut, roughly halfway between it and the Helix Nebula on the sky. It is currently 2.5 light-years (0.77 pc) from Fomalhaut (A), and 3.2 light-years away from Fomalhaut B (0.987 pc). The entire system is approximately 25 light-years (7.7 pc) from the Solar System.

== Discovery and observation ==
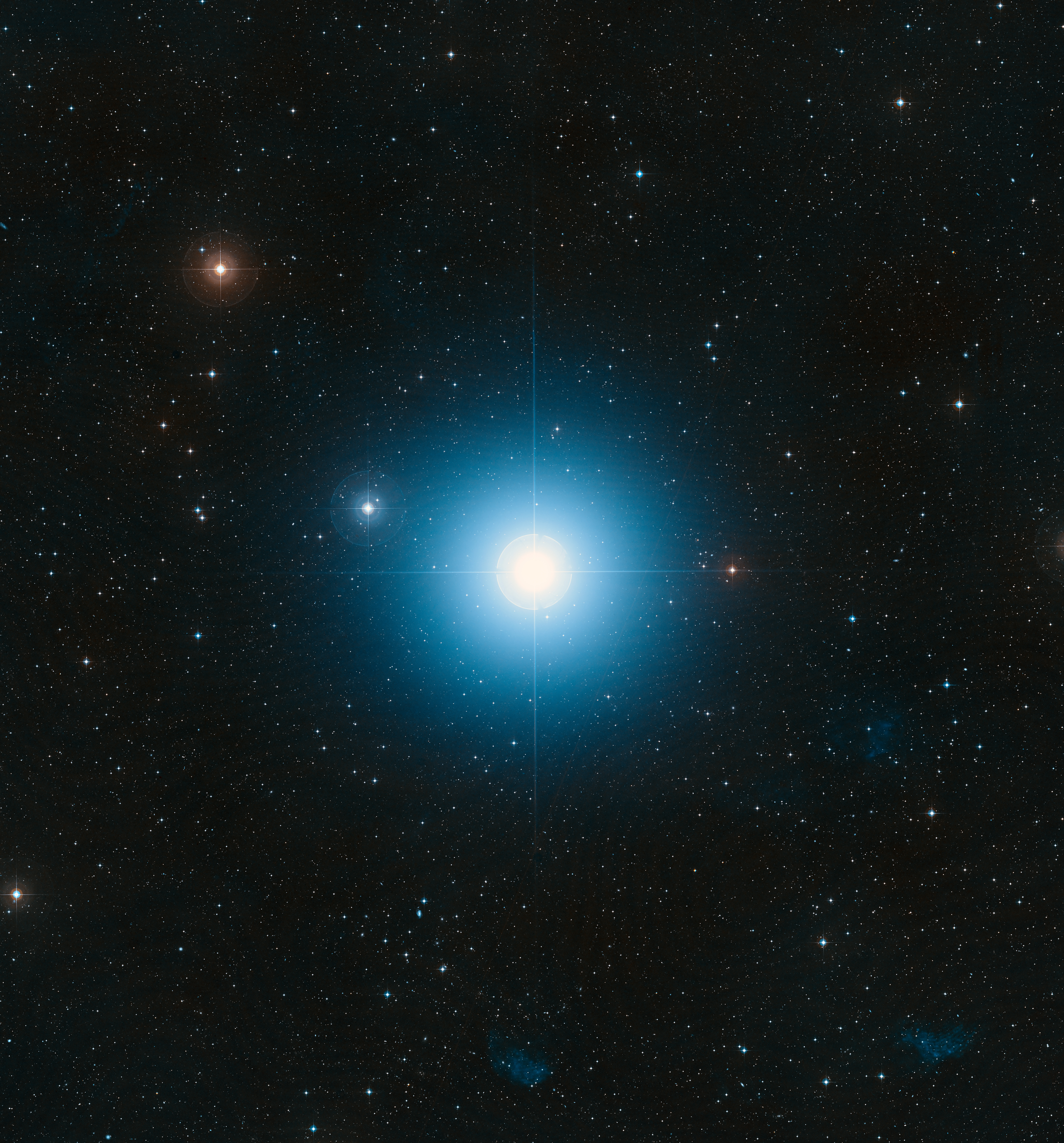
DSS image of Fomalhaut, the primary star of the system. This image does not contain Fomalhaut C.

Fomalhaut C was catalogued as a high-proper-motion star by Willem Luyten in 1979, and later, in October 2013, was determined to be part of the Fomalhaut system. The star has a mass of 0.2 M_{☉}, while Fomalhaut A is 1.9 M_{☉}, and Fomalhaut B is 0.7 M_{☉}. The apparent magnitude of Fomalhaut C is 12.6 requiring a six-inch aperture or larger telescope for direct visual observation. The entire system of Fomalhaut is around 440 million years old, which is roughly a tenth of the Solar System's age.

== Debris disk ==
The Fomalhaut C planetary system
Companion (in order from star)	Mass	Semimajor axis (AU)	Orbital period (days)	Eccentricity	Inclination (°)	Radius
Debris disk	26.4±0.6 AU				44±3°	—

In December 2013, a debris disk was discovered around this star. This is the second debris disk in the system, as a first one was discovered around Fomalhaut A. The debris disc was discovered with the Herschel Space Telescope, and with the telescope the debris disc's temperature has been estimated at 24 K. The distance from the star was originally thought to be around 10 AU, but since it is hypothesized that it is mainly small grains, which trap more heat, it may be further. However, if it were beyond 40 AU, it would have been already cataloged, which gives it a radius between 10 and 40 AU.

The disk was directly detected by ALMA in 2021 and by JWST in 2024.

=== Comets ===
In addition to the debris disk, there are also comets orbiting Fomalhaut C. The debris disk orbiting C is sometimes referred to as a comet belt, due to some very elliptical orbits. The disk around Fomalhaut A is also thought to have many comets, as it is also elliptical. The Fomalhaut A belt is thought to possibly be due to a close encounter with either an undiscovered exoplanet, Fomalhaut B, or Fomalhaut C. With both A and C having comet belts, the absence of one around B is a mystery. Not only does the presence of comets make the belt more elliptical, it also makes it brighter which takes a part in its discovery.

It has been hypothesized that Fomalhaut C could have hidden exoplanets within its belt of comets and asteroids. It has also been hypothesized that A & C have interacted which could have formed C's comet belt if the interaction involved A giving up comets and debris. With Fomalhaut B not having any discs or belts around it, it could have been unaffected by the encounter between them.

== Orbit ==
The orbit of Fomalhaut C around A is estimated to take 20 million years to complete. Due to the age of the three stars being 440 million years, and the distance of 2.5 light-years, this would mean that Fomalhaut C has only completed a full orbit around Fomalhaut A 22 times. The tidal radius of the Fomalhaut system is 6.2 light-years (1.9 parsecs), which makes Fomalhaut C well within it, which further proves the Fomalhaut system as a triple.

== See also ==
- Fomalhaut
- TW Piscis Austrini (Fomalhaut B)
- Fomalhaut b
