= Paul Kalas =

Greek American astronomer (born 1967)

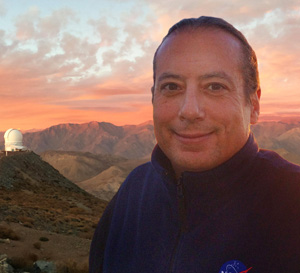
- Paul Kalas in 2015, Cerro Pachón, Chile
- Born: August 13, 1967 (age 59); New York City, United States
- Education: University of Hawaiʻi; University of Michigan
- Known for: Exoplanet Research; Fomalhaut, Fomalhaut b
- Awards: Newcomb Cleveland Prize (2009)
- Scientific career
- Fields: Astronomy
- Workplaces: University of California, Berkeley
- Doctoral advisor: David C. Jewitt

Paul Kalas (born August 13, 1967) is a Greek American astronomer known for his discoveries of debris disks around stars. Kalas led a team of scientists to obtain the first visible-light images of an extrasolar planet with orbital motion around the star Fomalhaut, at a distance of 25 light years from Earth. The planet is referred to as Fomalhaut b.

== Background ==
Kalas was born in New York City to George Kavallinis and Maria Drettakis, who immigrated to the United States from Heraklion, Crete. Kalas attended Detroit Country Day School in Michigan, and studied astronomy and physics at the University of Michigan, Ann Arbor. He earned a Doctor of Philosophy in Astronomy in 1996 from the University of Hawaiʻi under the direction of astronomer David C. Jewitt.

Kalas worked as a postdoctoral scientist at the Max Planck Institute for Astronomy in Heidelberg, Germany, the Space Telescope Science Institute, and the University of California, Berkeley. In 2006, he became an adjunct professor of astronomy at the University of California, Berkeley.

Kalas lives with his wife Aspasia Gkika and daughters Maria-Nikoleta and Natalia near Berkeley, California.

== Discoveries ==
Kalas discovered several circumstellar disks using a coronagraph on the Hubble Space Telescope and at the University of Hawaii 2.2-meter telescope at Mauna Kea, Hawaii. In 1995 he discovered various forms of asymmetric structures in optical images of the Beta Pictoris disk. He was the lead scientist for the first optical images of debris disks surrounding the nearby red dwarf AU Microscopii and the bright star Fomalhaut.

Kalas's Hubble Space Telescope image of Fomalhaut revealed a narrow belt of dusty material analogous to our Solar System's Kuiper Belt. However, Kalas also found that Fomalhaut's belt is narrow and geometrically offset from the star by 15 astronomical units. These features are considered strong evidence for an extrasolar planet orbiting Fomalhaut that gravitationally sculpts the morphology of the belt.

Circumstellar disks discovered: 5
AU Microscopii	October 14, 2003
Fomalhaut	May 17, 2004
HD 15115	July 17, 2006
HD 53143	September 11, 2004
HD 139664	October 14, 2004

== Honors ==
- Elected Fellow of the American Association for the Advancement of Science (2014)
- AIAA William H. Pickering Lecture (2010)
- Newcomb Cleveland Prize of the American Association for the Advancement of Science (2009)

== Selected publications ==
=== Articles ===
- Kalas, P.; Liu, M.C. & Matthews, B.C. (2004). "Discovery of a large dust disk around the nearby star AU Microscopii". Science. 303 (5666): 1990–1992. arXiv:astro-ph/0403132. Bibcode:2004Sci...303.1990K. doi:10.1126/science.1093420. PMID 14988511. S2CID 6943137.
- Kalas, P.; Graham, J.R. & Clampin, M. (2005). "A planetary system as the origin of structure in Fomalhaut's dust belt". Nature. 435 (7045): 1067–1070. arXiv:astro-ph/0506574. Bibcode:2005Natur.435.1067K. doi:10.1038/nature03601. PMID 15973402. S2CID 4406070.
- Kalas, Paul; et al. (2008). "Optical Images of an Exosolar Planet 25 Light-Years from Earth". Science. 322 (5906): 1345–1348. arXiv:0811.1994. Bibcode:2008Sci...322.1345K. doi:10.1126/science.1166609. PMID 19008414. S2CID 10054103.

=== Books ===
- Kalas, Paul (2018), The Oneironauts: Using dreams to engineer our future', Amazon Digital Services LLC - Kdp, ISBN 978-1720177616
