= Pleiades Phenomenon =

Reflection Nebulosity

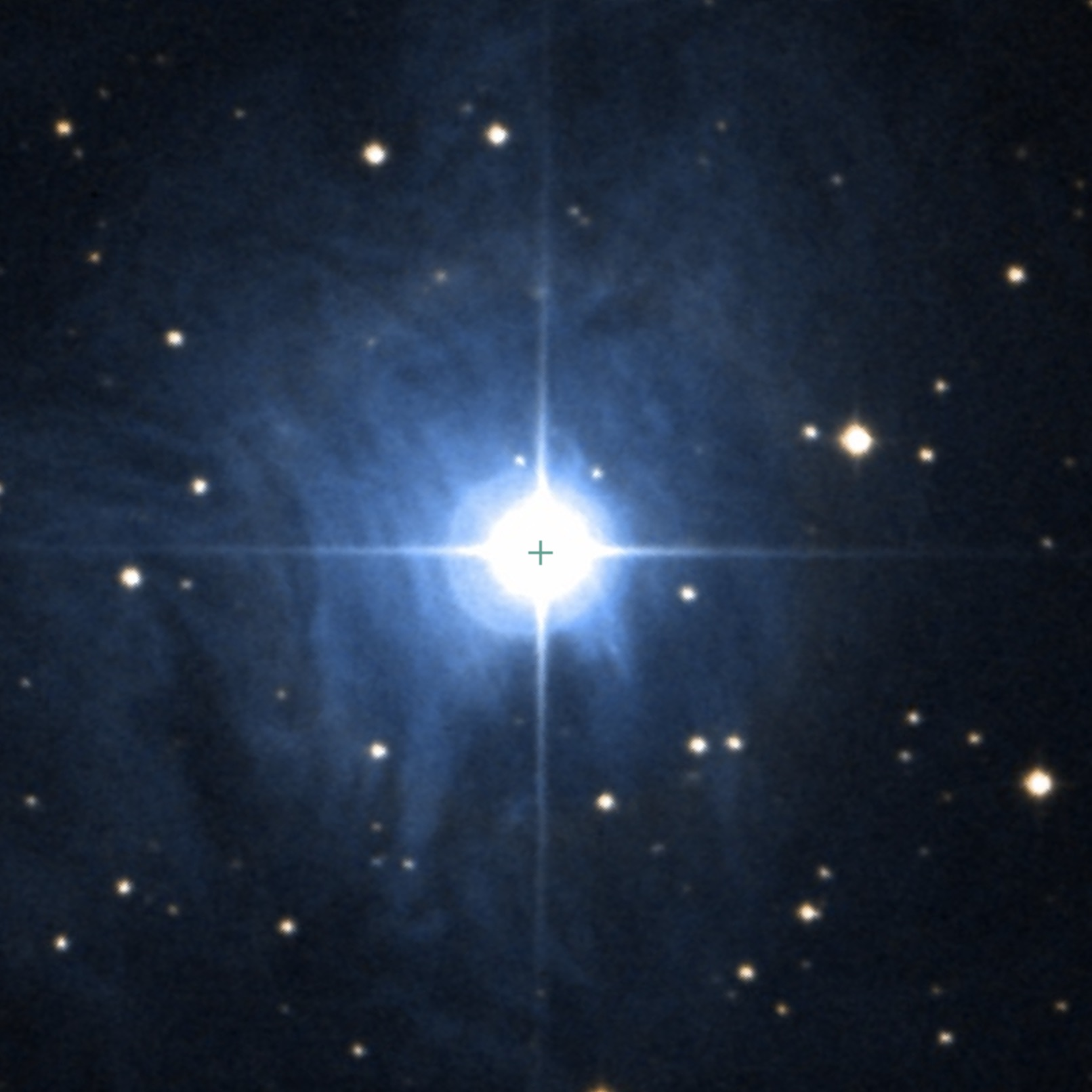
Example of the Pleiades Phenomenon around the star HD 26676.

The Pleiades Phenomenon refers to the chance encounter between a star and an interstellar cloud of dust that leads to the appearance of a reflection nebulosity with characteristics similar to those observed in the Pleiades open star cluster. This contrasts against reflection nebulae surrounding young stars where the dust is the remnant of star formation. The term Pleiades Phenomenon was coined by astronomer Paul Kalas who discovered five nebulosities not related to star forming regions using a coronagraph. The nebulosities were found to have "linear, filamentary, striated morphological structure" located between 1000 and 100,000 astronomical units from each star. A subsequent study of infrared sources in the Small Magellanic Cloud found evidence for the Pleiades Phenomenon outside of the Milky Way.
