= James R. Graham =

Irish astrophysicist

James R. Graham (c. 1960) is an Irish astrophysicist who works primarily in the fields of infrared astronomy instrumentation and adaptive optics.

== Biography ==
Graham pursued physics as his undergraduate major at Imperial College London, graduated with a BSc in 1982. He went on at Imperial College London to receive his PhD in physics in 1985. After receiving his PhD, Graham first held a research position at Lawrence Berkeley Lab, followed by a position at the California Institute of Technology. Since 1992, he has been a professor of astronomy at University of California, Berkeley.

== Research ==
In 1994, Graham was a member of a team that made one of the first definitive identifications of a brown dwarf in the Pleiades open cluster, which was also one of the first important discoveries made using the Keck telescopes. In the preceding years, other claims of brown dwarf detections were made and then often retracted or disputed. Graham's team looked for the signature of lithium absorption lines in the spectrum of the object. Lithium is quickly depleted in low mass stars due to mixing that brings the lithium in to contact with the hydrogen fusing core. As brown dwarfs by definition lack hydrogen fusion, the presence of lithium in the atmosphere of a low mass object is either an indicator of extreme youth or the absence of fusion. As such, the abundance of lithium in the atmosphere of PPL 15, along with the estimated age of the stars in Pleaides, indicate that PPL 15 is a brown dwarf.

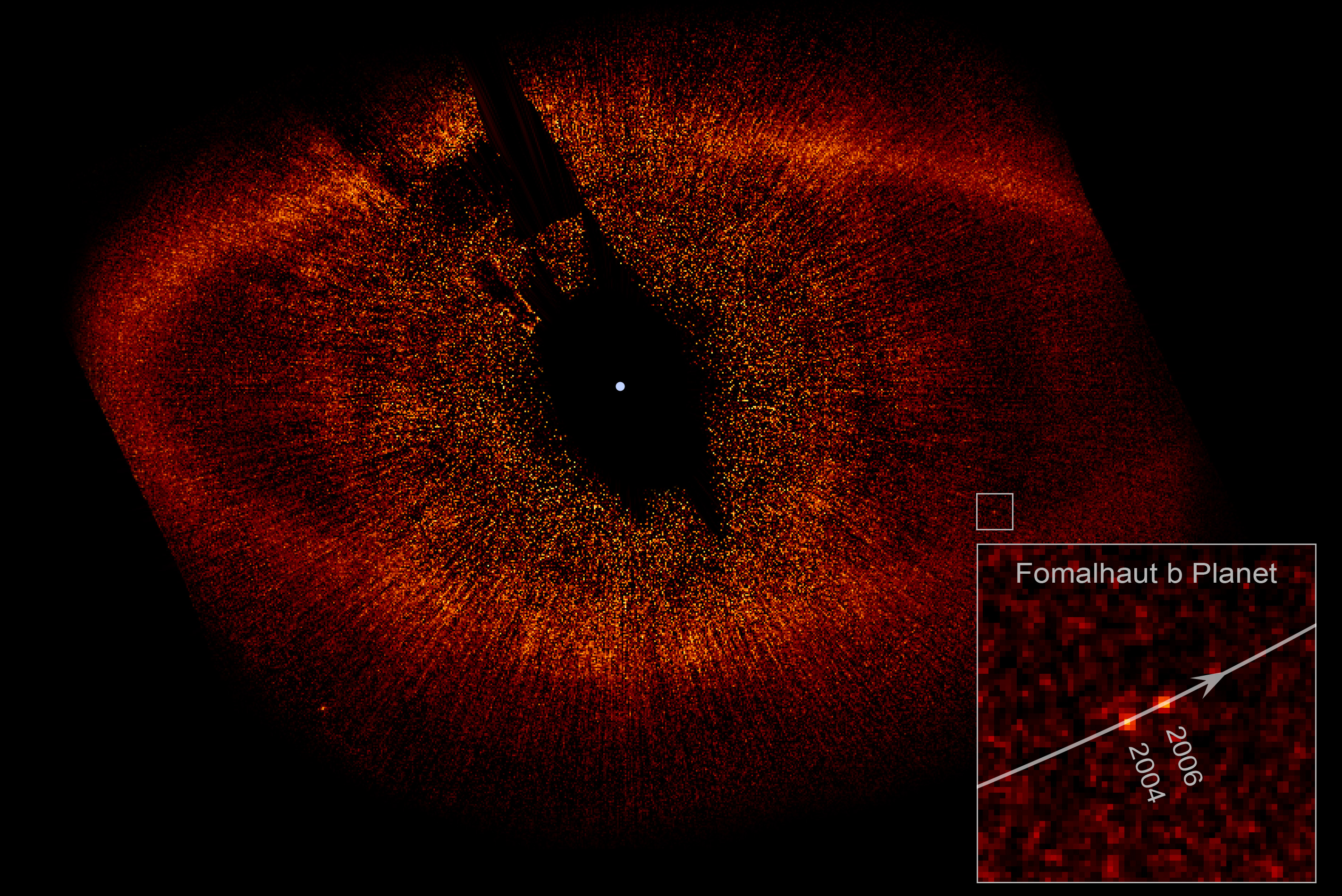
Fomalhaut b's position in 2004 and 2006.

Graham was involved in another first in 2008, when he was a member of the team that announced the detection of Fomalhaut b, the first exoplanet detected in visible light. Graham had first used the Hubble Space Telescope to take images of the debris disk around Fomalhaut in 2004, and from the structure of the disk, he and his team inferred the presence of a planet. Follow-up observations of the disk showed that a tiny speck of light at the inner edge of the disk was moving in orbit about Fomalhaut, as predicted.

Currently, Graham is working to detect many more planets by direct imaging. Graham is the project scientist for the Gemini Planet Imager, an extreme adaptive optics instrument that is on schedule to begin operation in 2013 at the Gemini Observatory in Chile. Imaging extrasolar planets is complicated primarily by the overwhelming brightness of the host star as compared to the planet, which Graham likens to "seeing a firefly next to a searchlight," and the distortions caused by random movement of air in the Earth's atmosphere. By using a coronagraph and adaptive optics, Graham hopes to overcome both difficulties and discover many more planets by the light they emit, and in doing so, learn directly about the composition of extrasolar planets.

== Honors ==
- Alfred P. Sloan Fellow (1992)
- Packard Fellow (1993)
- Noyce Prize for Excellence in Undergraduate Teaching (2007)
- Newcomb Cleveland Prize of the American Association for the Advancement of Science (2009)
- Miller Research Professorship with the Miller Institute for Basic Research in Science at the University of California Berkeley; 2013–14
