= HD 38529 =

Binary star system in the constellation Orion

- Location of HD 38529 (circled in red)

Observation data Epoch J2000.0 Equinox ICRS
- Constellation: Orion
- HD 38529 A
- Right ascension: 05^{h} 46^{m} 34.91314^{s}
- Declination: +01° 10′ 05.5029″
- Apparent magnitude (V): +5.95
- HD 38529 B
- Right ascension: 05^{h} 46^{m} 19.37663^{s}
- Declination: +01° 12′ 47.2640″
- Apparent magnitude (V): +13.35

Characteristics

HD 38529 A
- Evolutionary stage: subgiant
- Spectral type: G4IV
- B−V color index: 0.773

HD 38529 B
- Evolutionary stage: main sequence
- Spectral type: M3.0V

Astrometry

HD 38529 A
Radial velocity (R_{v})	30.19±0.12 km/s
Proper motion (μ)	RA: −77.806 mas/yr Dec.: −141.363 mas/yr
Parallax (π)	23.5714±0.0422 mas
Distance	138.4 ± 0.2 ly (42.42 ± 0.08 pc)
Absolute magnitude (M_{V})	+2.81

HD 38529 B
Radial velocity (R_{v})	30.94±0.43 km/s
Proper motion (μ)	RA: −78.612 mas/yr Dec.: −142.084 mas/yr
Parallax (π)	23.7139±0.0168 mas
Distance	137.54 ± 0.10 ly (42.17 ± 0.03 pc)
Absolute magnitude (M_{V})	+10.23

Details

HD 38529 A
Mass	1.479±0.037 M_{☉}
Radius	2.678±0.026 R_{☉}
Luminosity	6.16±0.15 L_{☉}
Surface gravity (log g)	3.83±0.06 cgs
Temperature	5619±44 K
Metallicity [Fe/H]	0.38±0.03 dex
Rotation	37.0±0.4 d
Rotational velocity (v sin i)	3.20±0.50 km/s
Age	3.07±0.39 Gyr

HD 38529 B
Mass	0.494 M_{☉}
Radius	0.496 R_{☉}
Luminosity	0.033 L_{☉}
Surface gravity (log g)	4.74 cgs
Temperature	3,487 K
Metallicity [Fe/H]	0.39 dex
Rotational velocity (v sin i)	17 km/s

Other designations
- RAG 1, WDS J05466+0110AB
- HD 38529 A: BD+01°1126, HIP 27253, HR 1988, WDS J05466+0110A
- HD 38529 B: WDS J05466+0110B, LP 598-99, 2MASS J05461937+0112471

Database references
SIMBAD	A
- B
Exoplanet Archive	data

HD 38529 (138 G. Orionis) is a binary star system approximately 138 light-years away in the constellation of Orion.

== HD 38529 A ==
HD 38529 A is a yellow subgiant star of spectral type G4IV, though it has also been classified as a main sequence dwarf of type G4V and a borderline giant star of type G8III/IV. It is about 48% more massive than the Sun.

Two substellar companions are known in orbit around this star, including one with a mass near the deuterium fusion limit that is often used as the dividing line between giant planets and brown dwarfs. There is a debris disk located at least 86 astronomical units from the star. Its orbit is probably mildly misaligned with the planetary orbits, by 21−45°.

=== Planetary system ===
In 2001, the planet HD 38529 b was discovered orbiting the star HD 38529 A by Debra Fischer and collaborators who detected it using the Doppler spectroscopy technique. It has a mass at least 78% that of Jupiter and orbits very close to the star, just beyond the distance limit for hot Jupiters. It does not transit the star.

In 2003, a massive superjovian HD 38529 c was found orbiting at 3.68 AU with a minimum mass of 12.7 Jupiter masses. Astrometric measurements from the Hipparcos satellite gave a best fit inclination of 160° and a true mass 37 times that of Jupiter, turning this planet into a brown dwarf.

Further study of the system using Hubble Space Telescope astrometry revised the mass of HD 38529 c downwards to 17.7 Jupiter masses and suggested the presence of an additional planet, orbiting in the gap between HD 38529 b and c. The possible third planet was refuted after additional radial velocity measurements were collected. Subsequent astrometric studies have found masses for HD 38529 c ranging from just 10.4 M_{J} to 18 M_{J}, with the most recent value as of 2025 being 12.9 M_{J}.

The HD 38529 A planetary system (Note: HD 38529 b: Henry et al. (2013) HD 38529 c: Feng et al. (2025) Debris disk: Xuan et al. (2020))
Companion (in order from star)	Mass	Semimajor axis (AU)	Orbital period (days)	Eccentricity	Inclination (°)	Radius
b	≥0.8047±0.0139 M_{J}	0.1278±0.0006	14.30978±0.00033	0.259±0.016	—	—
c	12.93+0.70 −0.49 M_{J}	3.604+0.043 −0.042	2127.8+3.3 −3.2	0.3507+0.0057 −0.0051	104.2+8.9 −11	—
Debris disk	46+38 −27–208±54 AU				71+10 −7°	—

== HD 38529 B ==
HD 38529 B is a common proper motion stellar companion to HD 38529 A at a projected distance of about ~12000 astronomical units. The star is a red dwarf of spectral type M3.0V. Wide binary stars such as HD 38529 AB have been shown to be vulnerable to disruption by galactic tides and perturbations by passing stars.

== See also ==
- List of extrasolar planets
- HD 168443
