= HD 168443 =

Star in the constellation Serpens

Observation data Epoch J2000.0 Equinox ICRS
- Constellation: Serpens
- Right ascension: 18^{h} 20^{m} 03.93329^{s}
- Declination: −09° 35′ 44.6146″
- Apparent magnitude (V): 6.92

Characteristics
- Spectral type: G6V
- B−V color index: 0.724±0.014

Astrometry
Radial velocity (R_{v})	−48.69±0.10 km/s
Proper motion (μ)	RA: −91.792±0.036 mas/yr Dec.: −223.979±0.030 mas/yr
Parallax (π)	25.5913±0.0410 mas
Distance	127.4 ± 0.2 ly (39.08 ± 0.06 pc)
Absolute magnitude (M_{V})	4.198

Details
Mass	0.995±0.019 M_{☉}
Radius	1.51±0.06 R_{☉}
Luminosity	2.413±0.009 L_{☉}
Surface gravity (log g)	4.07±0.06 cgs
Temperature	5,491±44 K
Metallicity [Fe/H]	+0.04±0.03 dex
Rotational velocity (v sin i)	2.20±0.50 km/s
Age	11.3+1.0 −0.8 Gyr

Other designations
- BD−09°4692, GJ 4052, HD 168443, HIP 89844, SAO 142228, LTT 7289

Database references
SIMBAD	data
Exoplanet Archive	data

HD 168443 is an ordinary yellow-hued star in the Serpens Cauda segment of the equatorial constellation of Serpens. It is known to have two substellar companions. With an apparent visual magnitude of 6.92, the star lies just below the nominal lower brightness limit of visibility to the normal human eye. This system is located at a distance of 127 light years from the Sun based on parallax, but is drifting closer with a radial velocity of −48.7 km/s.

This stellar object is a core hydrogen fusing G-type main-sequence star with a classification of G6V, although it is likely evolved with an age of around 11 billion years. It is slightly lower in mass than the Sun but has a radius that is larger by 51%. The star is spinning with a leisurely projected rotational velocity of 2.2 km/s and it has a very inactive chromosphere. It is radiating 2.4 times the luminosity of the Sun from its photosphere at an effective temperature of 5,491 K.

== Planetary system ==
HD 168443 is known to be orbited by a super-Jupiter exoplanet, discovered in 1999, and a brown dwarf, discovered in 2001. The brown dwarf takes 30 times longer to orbit the star than the planet. Both have eccentric orbits. An orbital fit to Hipparcos astrometric data suggested the brown dwarf has a mass of 34±12 M_{J}. A 2022 study utilizing both Hipparcos and Gaia data instead measured a true mass of 17.3 M_{J} for HD 168443 c, close to the minimum mass. Test simulations of massless particles orbiting in between these two bodies show that all such objects are quickly ejected within two million years. That suggests any other planetary companions would be orbiting further out from the star.

The HD 168443 planetary system
Companion (in order from star)	Mass	Semimajor axis (AU)	Orbital period (years)	Eccentricity	Inclination (°)	Radius
b	≥7.659±0.0975 M_{J}	0.2931±0.00181	0.1591010(11)	0.5288+0.0020 −0.0021	—	—
c	20.5±1.6 M_{J}	2.929+0.040 −0.045	4.8164+0.0052 −0.0030	0.2131±0.0034	117+6 −10	—

== See also ==
- HD 38529
- List of exoplanets discovered before 2000 - HD 168443 b
- List of exoplanets discovered between 2000–2009 - HD 168443 c
