= HD 168443 b =

Gas giant or brown dwarf orbiting HD 168443

Discovery
- Discovered by: Butler, Marcy et al.
- Discovery site: Hawaii, United States
- Discovery date: September 9, 1998
- Detection method: Doppler spectroscopy

Orbital characteristics
- Semi-major axis: 0.29 AU (43,000,000 km)
- Eccentricity: 0.529 ± 0.02
- Orbital period (sidereal): 58.116 ± 0.001 d
- Time of periastron: 2,451,616.36 ± 0.02
- Argument of periastron: 172.9
- Semi-amplitude: 475.9 ± 1.6
- Star: HD 168443

HD 168443 b is a planet with a minimum mass seven times as that of Jupiter. Given the high mass, this planet is likely to be a gas giant, or possibly a small brown dwarf depending on the orbital inclination. It orbits closer to its star than Mercury does to the Sun, and its surface temperature is likely to be very high. It was discovered in 1999 using radial velocity measurements taken at the W. M. Keck Observatory in Hawaii.

== See also ==
- List of exoplanets discovered before 2000
