= HD 107146 =

G-type star in the constellation Coma Berenices with a circumstellar disk

- Image of the debris disk with the REASONS survey

Observation data Epoch J2000 Equinox ICRS
- Constellation: Coma Berenices
- Right ascension: 12^{h} 19^{m} 06.50230^{s}
- Declination: +16° 32′ 53.8628″
- Apparent magnitude (V): 7.028

Characteristics
- Evolutionary stage: main sequence
- Spectral type: G2V
- U−B color index: +0.073
- B−V color index: +0.602

Astrometry
Radial velocity (R_{v})	+1.88 km/s
Proper motion (μ)	RA: −174.684 mas/yr Dec.: −149.0214 mas/yr
Parallax (π)	36.4038±0.0230 mas
Distance	89.59 ± 0.06 ly (27.47 ± 0.02 pc)
Absolute magnitude (M_{V})	+4.85

Details
Mass	1.09 M_{☉}
Radius	0.993±0.014 R_{☉}
Luminosity	1.1 L_{☉}
Surface gravity (log g)	4.56 cgs
Temperature	5850 K
Metallicity [Fe/H]	0.00 dex
Rotation	3.50±1.35 days
Age	80–200 Myr

Other designations
- BD+17°2462, HD 107146, HIP 60074, SAO 100038, NLTT 30317, 2MASS J12190650+1632541

Database references
SIMBAD	data

HD 107146 is a star in the constellation Coma Berenices that is located about 90 light-years (28 pc) from Earth. The apparent magnitude of 7.028 makes this star too faint to be seen with the unaided eye.

The physical properties of this star are similar to the Sun, including the stellar classification G2V, making this a solar analog. The mass of this star is about 109% of the solar mass (M_{☉}) and it has about 99% the radius of the Sun (R_{☉}). It is a young star with an age between 80 and 200 Myr. The axis of rotation is estimated at 21+8
−9 degrees to the line of sight and it completes a rotation in a relatively brief 3.5 days.

== Circumstellar disc ==
In 2003, astronomers recognized the excess infrared and submillimeter emission indicative of circumstellar dust, the first time such a debris disk phenomenon was noted around a star of similar spectral types to the Sun, though having a much younger age. In 2004 the Hubble Space Telescope detected the presence of a spatially resolved disk surrounding the star.

The star's circumstellar disc has dimensions of approximately 210 × 300 AU. The dusty ring is cool, with a temperature of 51 K (−222 °C; −368 °F), and has a dust mass of 0.250±0.004 M_{🜨} and nearly no gas. Analysis of the debris disk in the far-infrared and submillimeter wavelengths, carried out using the Hubble Space Telescope, suggests the presence of small grains in the disk. The disk appears to be slightly elongated to form an ellipse with its minor axis at a position angle of 58° ± 5°; working under the assumption that the disk is in fact circular gives it an inclination of 25° ± 5° from the plane of the sky. An analysis published in 2009 suggests the possible presence of a planet at a separation of 45-75 AU, in the wide gap centered at 75.4 AU which may be carved by the planet, but no planet with mass exceeding 1-2 M_{J} was observed in the gap.

The planetary system
Companion (in order from star)	Mass	Semimajor axis (AU)	Orbital period (days)	Eccentricity	Inclination (°)	Radius
Debris disk	46.6–135.6 AU				19.3±1.0°	—

== Gallery ==
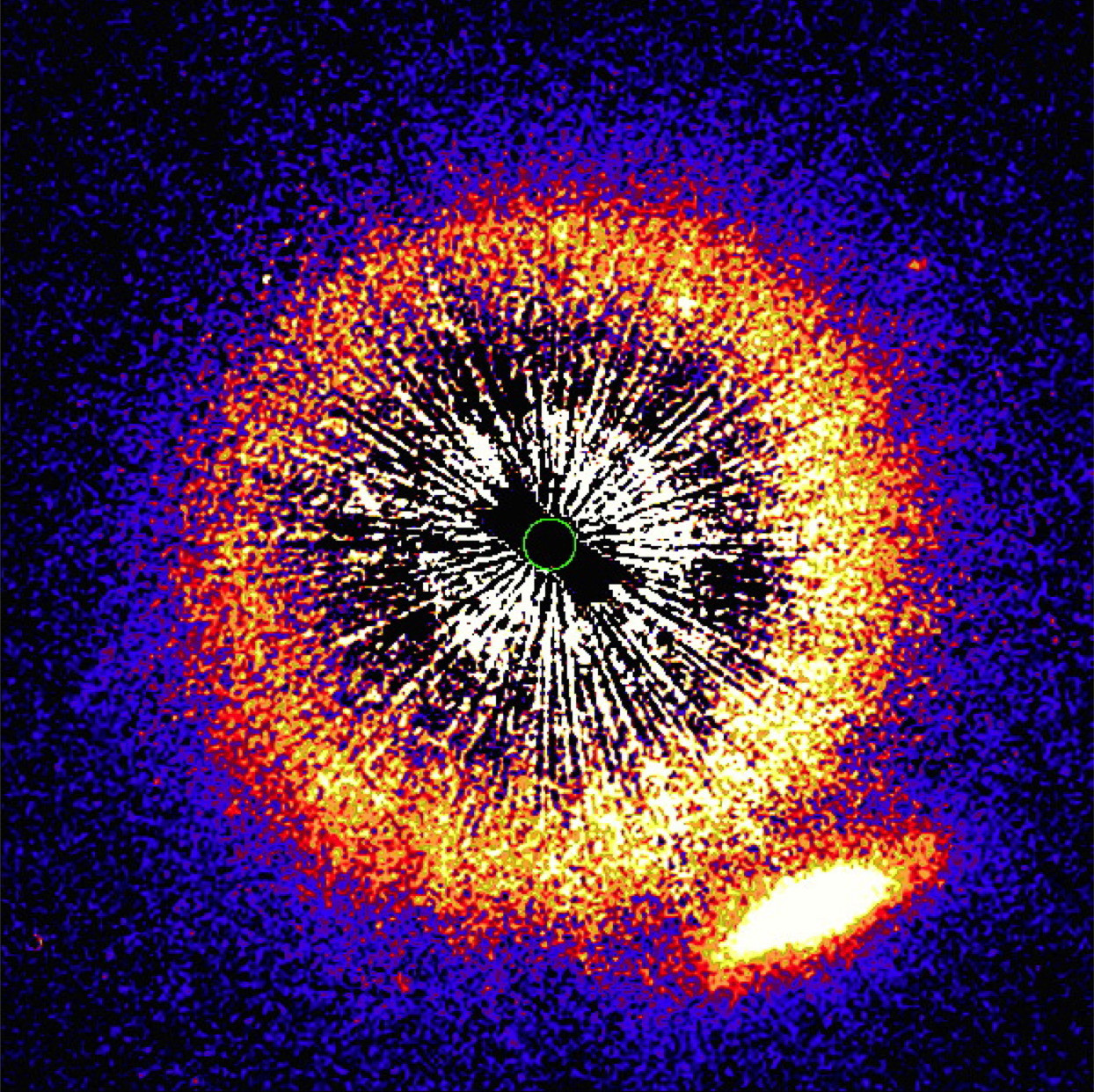
Transit of Vermin Galaxy behind HD 107146.

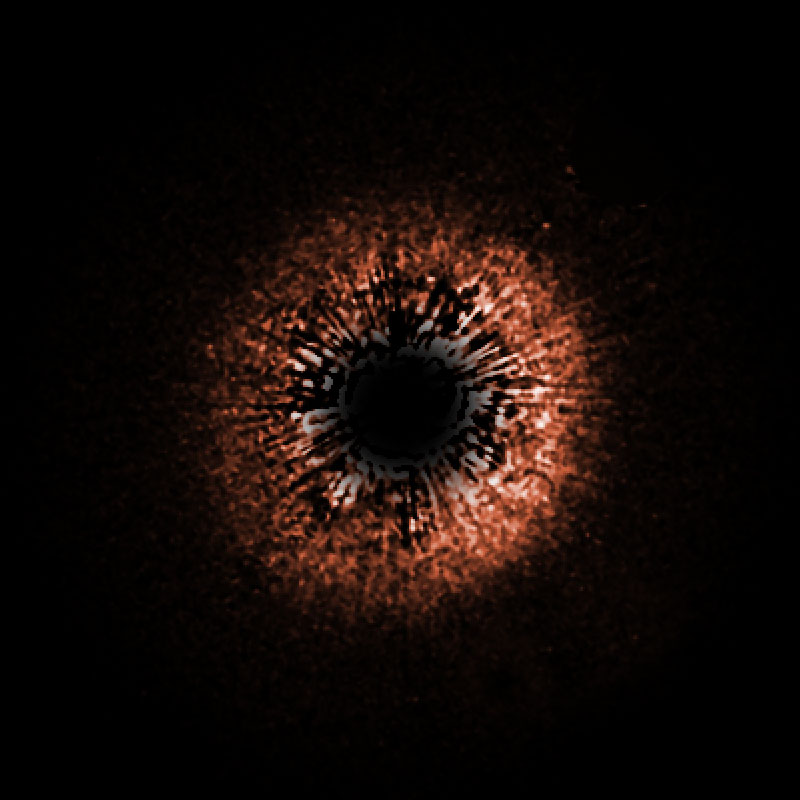
False colour image of HD 107146 taken by the Hubble Space Telescope, showing its circumstellar disc. The right side of the disc is brighter due to inclination of the disc to the line of sight and preferential forward scattering of the light from the star.
