= HD 38529 b =

Extrasolar planet in the constellation Orion

Discovery
- Discovered by: Fischer et al.
- Discovery site: United States
- Discovery date: July 5, 2000
- Detection method: Doppler Spectroscopy

Orbital characteristics
- Semi-major axis: 0.131 ± 0.0015 AU (19,600,000 ± 220,000 km) (Note: Parameters from the 2-companion solution (table 12). Including the unconfirmed third companion yields slightly different parameters.)
- Eccentricity: 0.248 ± 0.007
- Orbital period (sidereal): 14.3104 ± 0.0002 d
- Time of periastron: 2,450,020.19 ± 0.08
- Argument of periastron: 95.9 ± 1.7
- Semi-amplitude: 59.17 ± 0.42
- Star: HD 38529 A

HD 38529 b is an extrasolar planet approximately 138 light years away in the constellation of Orion. This planet was discovered in 2000. Because of its mass it is likely a gas giant.
