= AU Microscopii =

Star in the constellation Microscopium

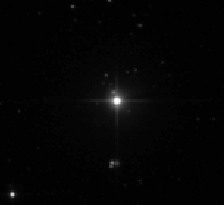
- AU Microscopii, J band image, 2MASS.

Observation data Epoch J2000 Equinox ICRS
- Constellation: Microscopium
- Right ascension: 20^{h} 45^{m} 09.53250^{s}
- Declination: –31° 20′ 27.2379″
- Apparent magnitude (V): 8.73

Characteristics
- Spectral type: M1Ve
- Apparent magnitude (V): 8.627±0.052
- Apparent magnitude (J): 5.436±0.017
- U−B color index: 1.01
- B−V color index: 1.45
- Variable type: Flare star

Astrometry
Radial velocity (R_{v})	−6.90±0.37 km/s
Proper motion (μ)	RA: +281.319 mas/yr Dec.: -360.148 mas/yr
Parallax (π)	102.9432±0.0231 mas
Distance	31.683 ± 0.007 ly (9.714 ± 0.002 pc)
Absolute magnitude (M_{V})	8.61

Details
Mass	0.60±0.04 M_{☉}
Radius	0.82±0.02 R_{☉}
Luminosity	0.102±0.002 L_{☉}
Surface gravity (log g)	4.52±0.05 cgs
Temperature	3665±31 K
Rotation	4.8367±0.0006 d
Rotational velocity (v sin i)	8.5±0.2 km/s
Age	23±3, 18.5±2.4 Myr

Other designations
- AU Mic, CD−31°17815, GJ 803, HD 197481, HIP 102409, SAO 212402, LTT 8214, PLX 4939.00, TOI-2221, MCC 824, LDS 720 A

Database references
SIMBAD	data
Exoplanet Archive	data
ARICNS	data

AU Microscopii (AU Mic) is a young red dwarf star located 31.7 light-years (9.7 parsecs) away – about 8 times as far as the closest star after the Sun. The apparent visual magnitude of AU Microscopii is 8.73, which is too dim to be seen with the naked eye. It was given this designation because it is in the southern constellation Microscopium and is a variable star. Like β Pictoris, AU Microscopii has a circumstellar disk of dust known as a debris disk and at least three exoplanets, with the presence of an additional planet being likely.

== Stellar properties ==
AU Mic is a young star at only 22 million years old; less than 1% of the age of the Sun. With a stellar classification of M1 Ve, it is a red dwarf star with a physical radius of 75% that of the Sun. Despite being half the Sun's mass, it is radiating only 9% as much luminosity as the Sun. This energy is being emitted from the star's outer atmosphere at an effective temperature of 3,700 K, giving it the cool orange-red hued glow of an M-type star. AU Microscopii is a member of the β Pictoris moving group. AU Microscopii may be gravitationally bound to the binary star system AT Microscopii.

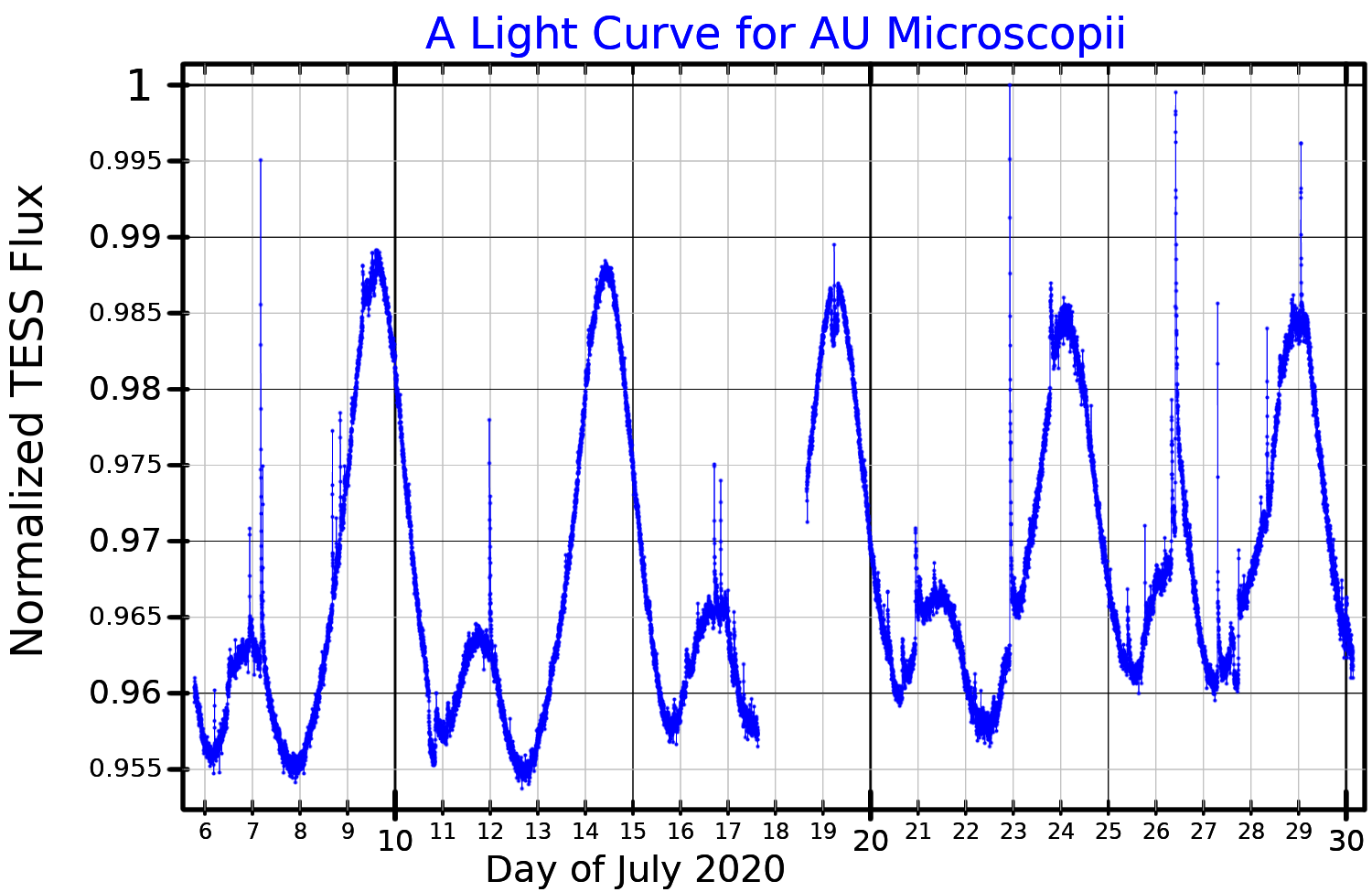
A light curve for AU Microscopii, plotted from TESS data

AU Microscopii has been observed in every part of the electromagnetic spectrum from radio to X-ray and is known to undergo flaring activity at all these wavelengths. Its flaring behaviour was first identified in 1973. Underlying these random outbreaks is a nearly sinusoidal variation in its brightness with a period of 4.865 days. The amplitude of this variation changes slowly with time. The V band brightness variation was approximately 0.3 magnitudes in 1971; by 1980 it was merely 0.1 magnitudes.

== Planetary system ==
AU Microscopii's debris disk has an asymmetric structure and an inner gap or hole cleared of debris, which has led a number of astronomers to search for planets orbiting AU Microscopii. By 2007, no searches had led to any detections of planets. However, in 2020 the discovery of a Neptune-sized planet was announced based on transit observations by TESS. Its rotation axis is well aligned with the rotation axis of the parent star, with the misalignment being equal to 5^{+16}_{−15}°.The radial-velocity confirmation of AU Microscopii b was led by astronomer Peter Plavchan.

Since 2018, a second planet, AU Microscopii c, was suspected to exist. It was confirmed in December 2020, after additional transit events were documented by the TESS observatory. A 2024 study which performed measurements of Rossiter–McLaughlin effect for the planet c revealed that the planet is possibly misaligned with the star's rotation axis, returning a poorly constrained value of projected obliquity λ_{c} = 67.8°+31.7°
−49.0°.

A third planet in the system was suspected since 2022 based on transit-timing variations, and "validated" in 2023, although several possible orbital periods of planet d cannot be ruled out yet. This planet has a mass comparable to that of Earth. Radial velocity observations have also found evidence for a fourth, outer planet as of 2023. Observations of the AU Microscopii system with the James Webb Space Telescope were unable to confirm the presence of previously unknown companions. Observations with CHEOPS also confirmed TTVs of AU Mic c, which is explained by a planet d on a 12.6 day orbit. The mass of planet d is found to be only about 20% of the mass of earth (or two Mars masses) according to this study.

The AU Microscopii planetary system
Companion (in order from star)	Mass	Semimajor axis (AU)	Orbital period (days)	Eccentricity	Inclination (°)	Radius
b	6.3+2.5 −1.8 M_{🜨}	0.0645±0.0013	8.4630351±0.0000003	0.00021±0.00006	89.9904+0.0036 −0.0019	4.07±0.17 R_{🜨}
d	1.053±0.511 M_{🜨}	—	12.73596±0.00793	0.00097±0.00042	89.31812±1.15800	—
c	11.6+3.3 −2.7 M_{🜨}	0.1101±0.0020	18.85901±0.00009	0.01056±0.00089	89.589+0.058 −0.068	3.24±0.16 R_{🜨}
e (unconfirmed)	35.2+6.7 −5.4 M_{🜨}	0.17	33.11±0.06	—	—	—
f (hypothetical)	~2 M_{J}	~3.52	—	~0.37	~30°	—
Debris disk?	5–6 AU				—	—
Debris disk	<50–>150 AU				88.4±0.1°	—

=== Debris disk ===
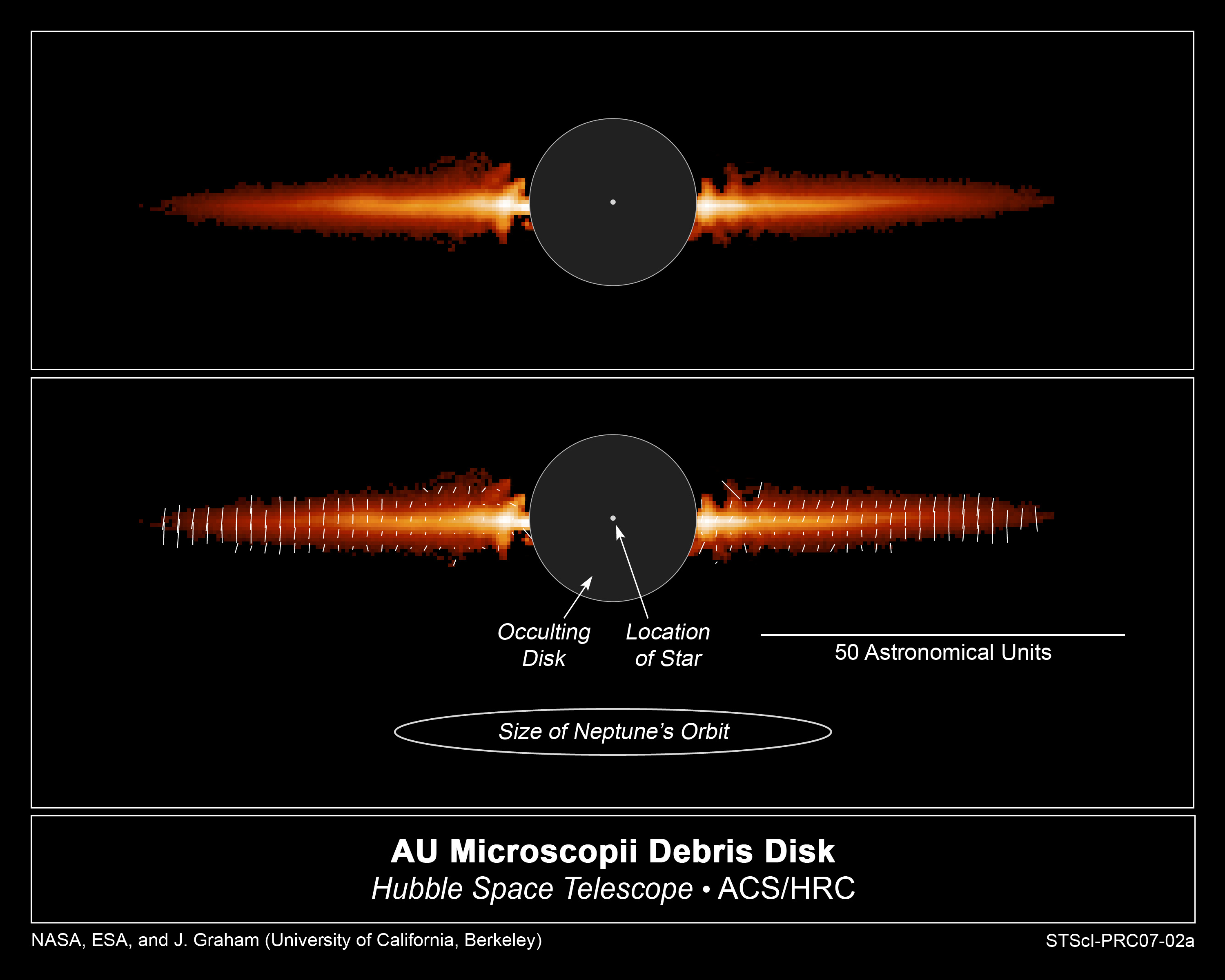
Hubble Space Telescope image of the debris disk around AU Microscopii.

This short time lapse sequence shows images of the debris disk's "fast-moving features".

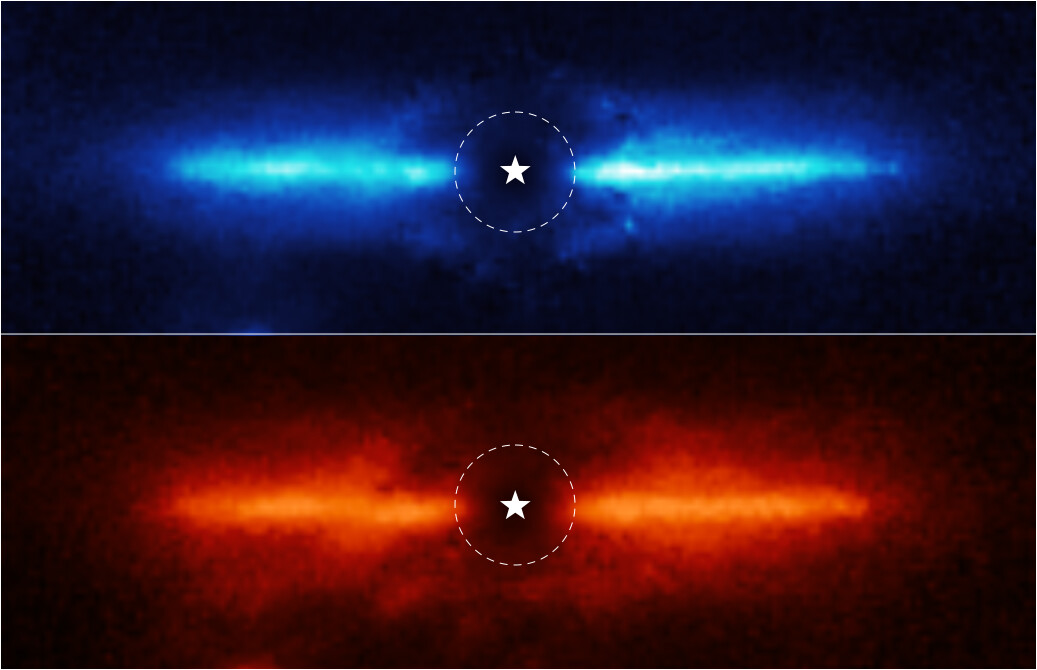
James Webb Space Telescope has imaged (Au Mic) the inner workings of a dusty disk surrounding a nearby red dwarf star.

All-sky observations with the Infrared Astronomy Satellite revealed faint infrared emission from AU Microscopii. This emission is due to a circumstellar disk of dust which first resolved at optical wavelengths in 2003 by Paul Kalas and collaborators using the University of Hawaii 2.2-m telescope on Mauna Kea, Hawaii. This large debris disk faces the earth edge-on at nearly 90 degrees, and measures at least 200 AU in radius. At these large distances from the star, the lifetime of dust in the disk exceeds the age of AU Microscopii. The disk has a gas to dust mass ratio of no more than 6:1, much lower than the usually assumed primordial value of 100:1. The debris disk is therefore referred to as "gas-poor", as the primordial gas within the circumstellar system has been mostly depleted. The total amount of dust visible in the disk is estimated to be at least a lunar mass, while the larger planetesimals from which the dust is produced are inferred to have at least six lunar masses.

The spectral energy distribution of AU Microscopii's debris disk at submillimetre wavelengths indicate the presence of an inner hole in the disk extending to 17 AU, while scattered light images estimate the inner hole to be 12 AU in radius. Combining the spectral energy distribution with the surface brightness profile yields a smaller estimate of the radius of the inner hole, 1 - 10 AU. The inner part of the disk is asymmetric and shows structure in the inner 40 AU. The inner structure has been compared with that expected to be seen if the disk is influenced by larger bodies or has undergone recent planet formation. The surface brightness (brightness per area) of the disk in the near infrared $\scriptstyle I$ as a function of projected distance $\scriptstyle r$ from the star follows a characteristic shape. The inner $\scriptstyle r\,<\,15 AU$ of the disk appear approximately constant in density and the brightness is unchanging, more-or-less flat. Around $\scriptstyle r\, \approx\, 15 AU$ the density and surface brightness begins to decrease: first it decreases slowly in proportion to distance as $\scriptstyle I\, \propto \, r^{-1.8}$; then outside $\scriptstyle r\, \approx\, 43 AU$, the density and brightness drops much more steeply, as $\scriptstyle I\, \propto \, r^{-4.7}$. This "broken power-law" shape is similar to the shape of the profile of β Pic's disk.

In October 2015 it was reported that astronomers using the Very Large Telescope (VLT) had detected very unusual outward-moving features in the disk. By comparing the VLT images with those taken by the Hubble Space Telescope in 2010 and 2011 it was found that the wave-like structures are moving away from the star at speeds of up to 10 kilometers per second (22,000 miles per hour). The waves farther away from the star seem to be moving faster than those close to it, and at least three of the features are moving fast enough to escape the gravitational pull of the star. Follow-up observations with the SPHERE instrument on the Very Large Telescope were able to confirm the presence of the fast-moving features, and James Webb Space Telescope observations found similar features within the disk in two NIRCam filters; however, these features have not been detected in the radio with Atacama Large Millimeter Array observations. These fast-moving features have been described as "dust avalanches", where dust particles catastrophically collide into planetesimals within the disk.

== Methods of observation ==
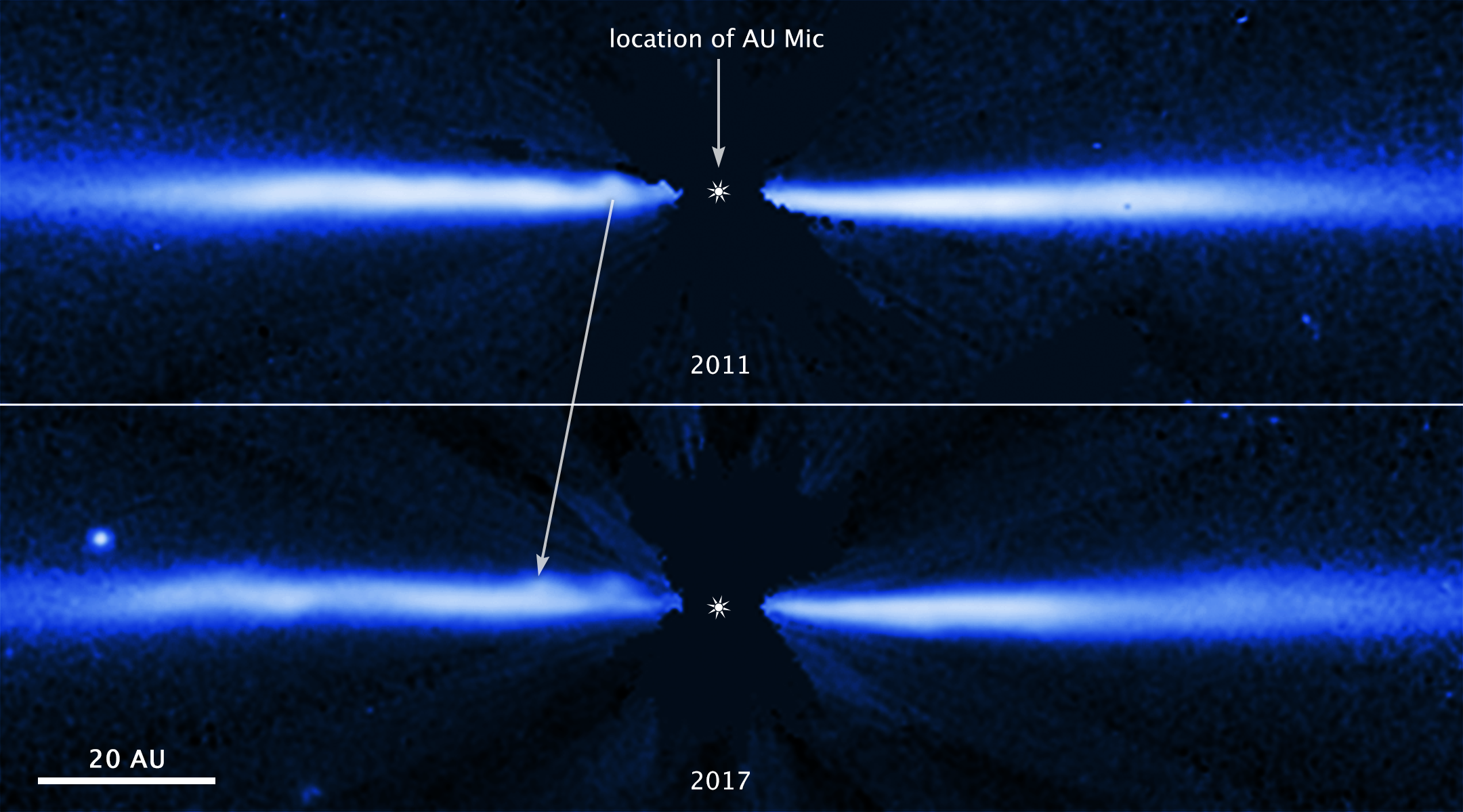
Hubble observations of blobs of material sweeping through stellar disc.

AU Mic's disk has been observed at a variety of different wavelengths, giving humans different types of information about the system. The light from the disk observed at optical wavelengths is stellar light that has reflected (scattered) off dust particles into Earth's line of sight. Observations at these wavelengths utilize a coronagraphic spot to block the bright light coming directly from the star. Such observations provide high-resolution images of the disk. Because light having a wavelength longer than the size of a dust grain is scattered only poorly, comparing images at different wavelengths (visible and near-infrared, for example) gives humans information about the sizes of the dust grains in the disk.

Millimeter observation of the disk from the REASONS survey

Optical observations have been made with the Hubble Space Telescope and Keck Telescopes. The system has also been observed at infrared and sub-millimeter wavelengths with the James Clerk Maxwell Telescope, Spitzer Space Telescope, and the James Webb Space Telescope. This light is emitted directly by dust grains as a result of their internal heat (modified blackbody radiation). The disk cannot be resolved at these wavelengths, so such observations are measurements of the amount of light coming from the entire system. Observations at increasingly longer wavelengths give information about dust particles of larger sizes and at larger distances from the star.

== Gallery ==
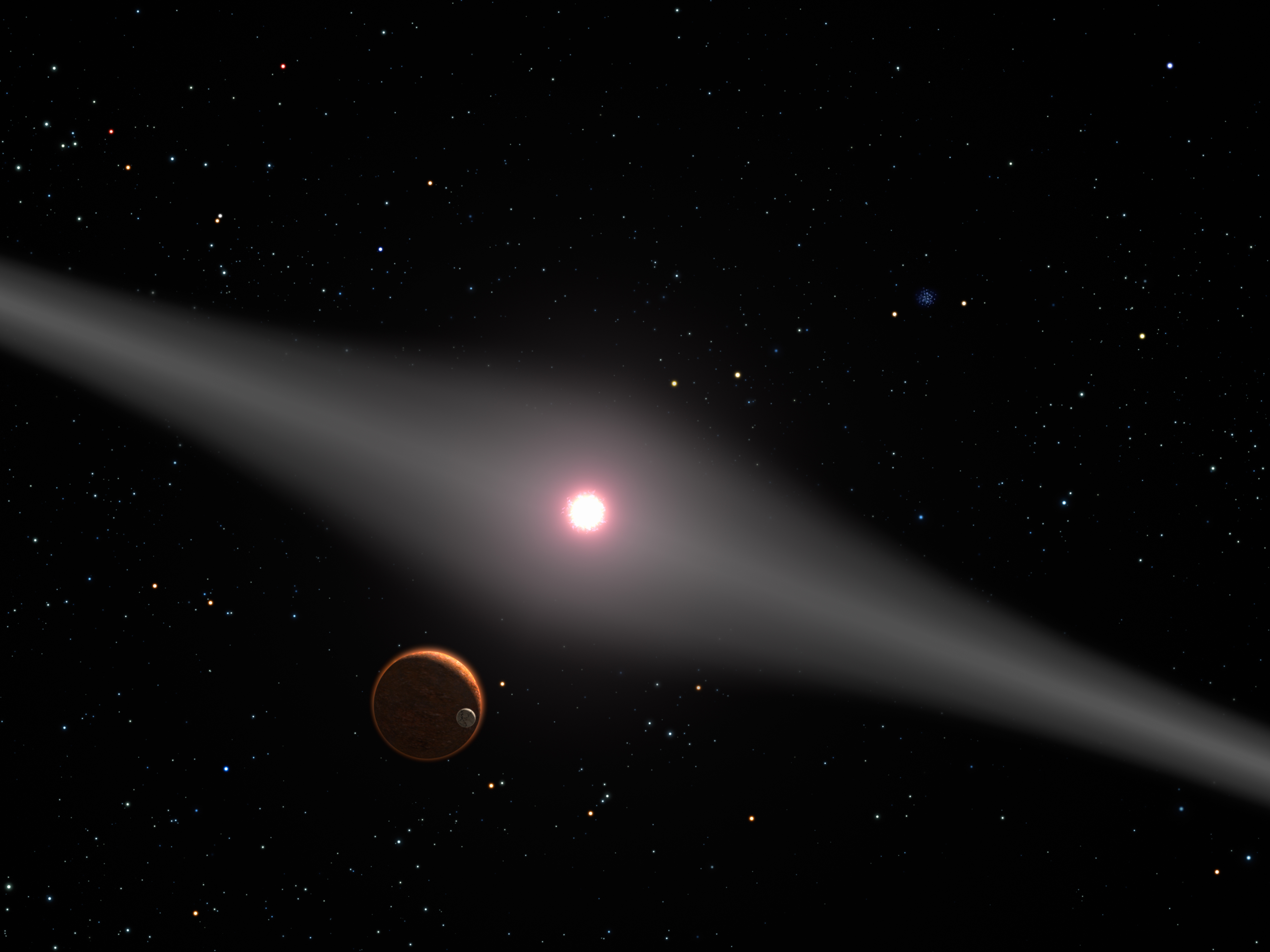
Artist's impression of AU Microscopii Credit: NASA/ESA/G. Bacon (STScI)

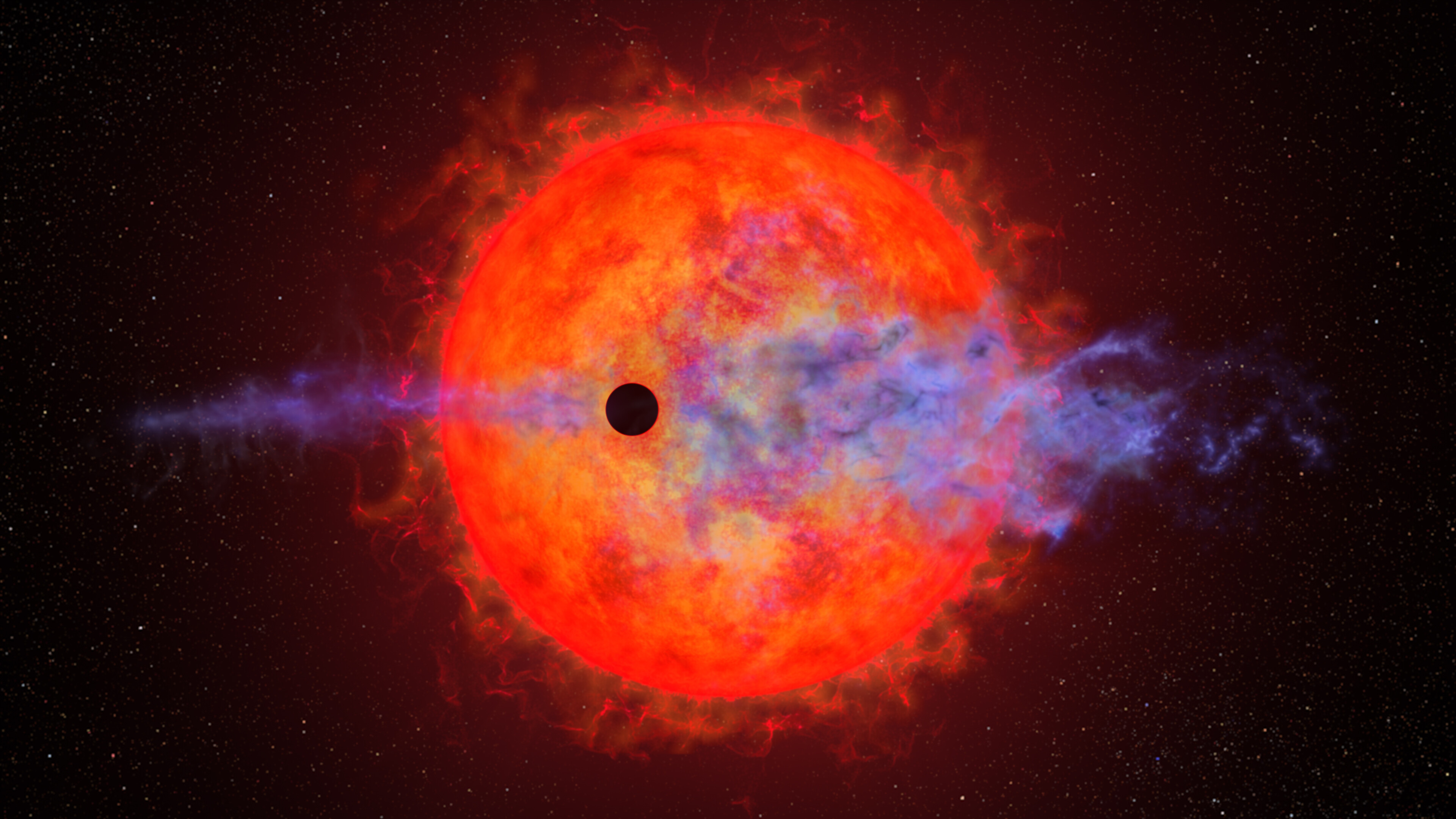
Artist's impression of AU Microscopii and planet AU Mic b, which is losing mass.

== See also ==
- List of exoplanets discovered in 2020 - AU Microscopii b and c
- List of exoplanets discovered in 2023 - AU Microscopii d
