= HD 92945 =

K-type star in the constellation Hydra

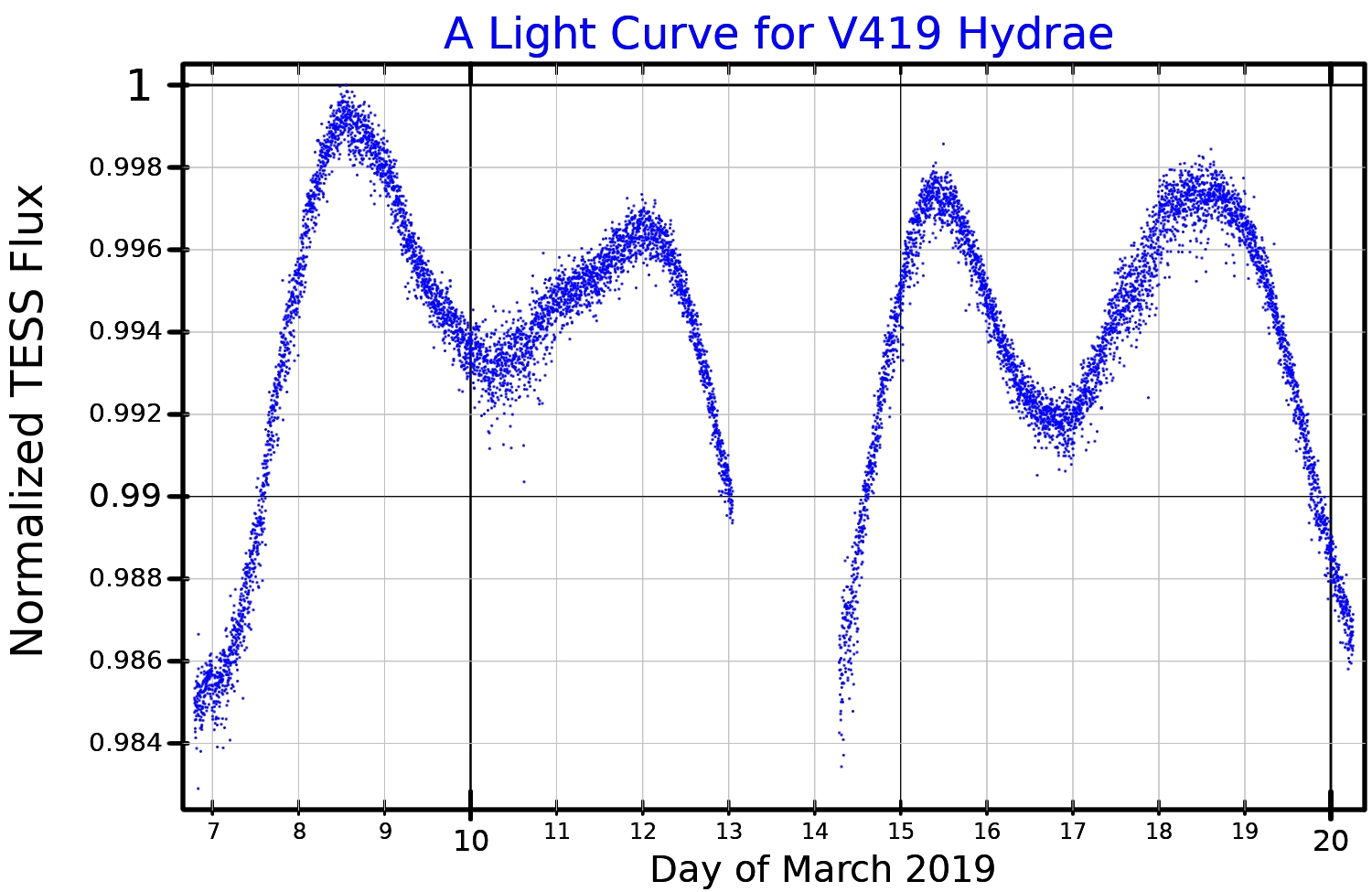
- A light curve for V419 Hydrae, plotted over one 13.47 day period, from TESS data

Observation data Epoch J2000 Equinox ICRS
- Constellation: Hydra
- Right ascension: 10^{h} 43^{m} 28.2716^{s}
- Declination: −29° 03′ 51.433″
- Apparent magnitude (V): 7.72

Characteristics
- Evolutionary stage: main sequence
- Spectral type: K1V
- U−B color index: +0.55
- B−V color index: +0.88
- Variable type: BY Dra

Astrometry
Radial velocity (R_{v})	22.706±0.14 km/s
Proper motion (μ)	RA: −215.484 mas/yr Dec.: −49.892 mas/yr
Parallax (π)	46.4931±0.0198 mas
Distance	70.15 ± 0.03 ly (21.509 ± 0.009 pc)
Absolute magnitude (M_{V})	6.07

Details
Mass	0.86±0.01 M_{☉}
Radius	0.77 R_{☉}
Luminosity	0.38 L_{☉}
Surface gravity (log g)	4.39 cgs
Temperature	5000 K
Metallicity [Fe/H]	−0.17 dex
Rotation	6.2 days
Rotational velocity (v sin i)	4 km/s
Age	294±23 Myr

Other designations
- V419 Hydrae, V419 Hya, CD−28 8394, CPD−28 4175, GJ 3615, HIP 52462, LTT 3932, NLTT 25167, PPM 258065, SAO 179168, 2MASS J10432828-2903513

Database references
SIMBAD	data

HD 92945 is a K-type main sequence star located 70 light years away in the northern constellation of Hydra. Its apparent visual magnitude varies by 0.02 magnitudes and is approximately 7.72 at maximum brightness.

== Debris disk ==
Image of the debris disk with the REASONS survey

In 2007, a debris disk with estimated dust mass 0.047±0.003 M_{🜨} has been observed around the star by coronagraphic imaging, using the ACS and NICMOS instruments on the Hubble Space Telescope. It appears to extend 45 to 175 astronomical units from HD 92945.

The disk has a gap 20+10
−8 AU wide at a radius of 73±3 AU, which may be being carved by a planet. No planet with mass exceeding 1-2 M_{J} was observed in the gap, but a lower-mass planet or a chain of two planets are still possible.

Evidence for a planet via astrometric observations was presented in 2024. It could be explain the presence of the gap through long-term resonances with the disk, as its orbital separation is much less than the gap's radius and thus the planet would not be carving the disk directly. Alternatively, both the inner planet and an additional planet within the gap could be shepherding the disk through long-term gravitational interactions.

The HD 92945 planetary system
Companion (in order from star)	Mass	Semimajor axis (AU)	Orbital period (years)	Eccentricity	Inclination (°)	Radius
Debris disk	50–140 AU				65.4±0.9°	—
(unconfirmed)	0.4 – 5 M_{J}	2.5 – 30	—	—	—	—
