= HD 139664 =

Star in the constellation Lupus

- Location of HD 139664 (circled in red)

Observation data Epoch J2000.0 Equinox J2000.0 (ICRS)
- Constellation: Lupus
- Right ascension: 15^{h} 41^{m} 11.3768^{s}
- Declination: −44° 39′ 40.342″
- Apparent magnitude (V): 4.64

Characteristics
- Evolutionary stage: main sequence
- Spectral type: F3/5V
- U−B color index: −0.03
- B−V color index: +0.413
- R−I color index: +0.20

Astrometry
Radial velocity (R_{v})	−7.08±0.03 km/s
Proper motion (μ)	RA: −169.106 mas/yr Dec.: −266.391 mas/yr
Parallax (π)	57.4759±0.1312 mas
Distance	56.7 ± 0.1 ly (17.40 ± 0.04 pc)
Absolute magnitude (M_{V})	3.57

Details
Mass	1.368±0.026 M_{☉}
Radius	1.26 R_{☉}
Luminosity	3.31 L_{☉}
Surface gravity (log g)	4.29 cgs
Temperature	6,704±63 K
Rotation	0.719 d
Rotational velocity (v sin i)	71.6 km/s
Age	1.11±1.40 Gyr

Other designations
- g Lupi, CD−44°10310, CPD−44°7529, GC 21070, GJ 594, HD 139664, HIP 76829, HR 5825, SAO 226064, PPM 320883, LTT 6256, NLTT 40843

Database references
SIMBAD	data

HD 139664 is a single star in the southern constellation of Lupus. It has the Bayer designation g Lupi; HD 139664 is the star's identifier from the Henry Draper Catalogue. It has a yellow-white hue and is visible to the naked eye with an apparent visual magnitude of 4.64. The star is located at a distance of 57 light years from the Sun based on parallax, and it is drifting closer with a radial velocity of −7 km/s. It is a member of the Hercules-Lyra association of co-moving stars.

This is an F-type main-sequence star with a stellar classification of F3/5V, which indicates it is generating energy through core hydrogen fusion. The estimated age is poorly constrained at around one billion years, but the age of the Hercules-Lyra association to which it belongs is 257±46 million years. It has a moderately high rate of spin, showing a projected rotational velocity of 71.6 km/s. The star has 1.37 times the mass of the Sun and 1.26 times the Sun's radius. It is radiating 3.31 times the luminosity of the Sun from its photosphere at an effective temperature of 6,704 K.

== Debris disk ==
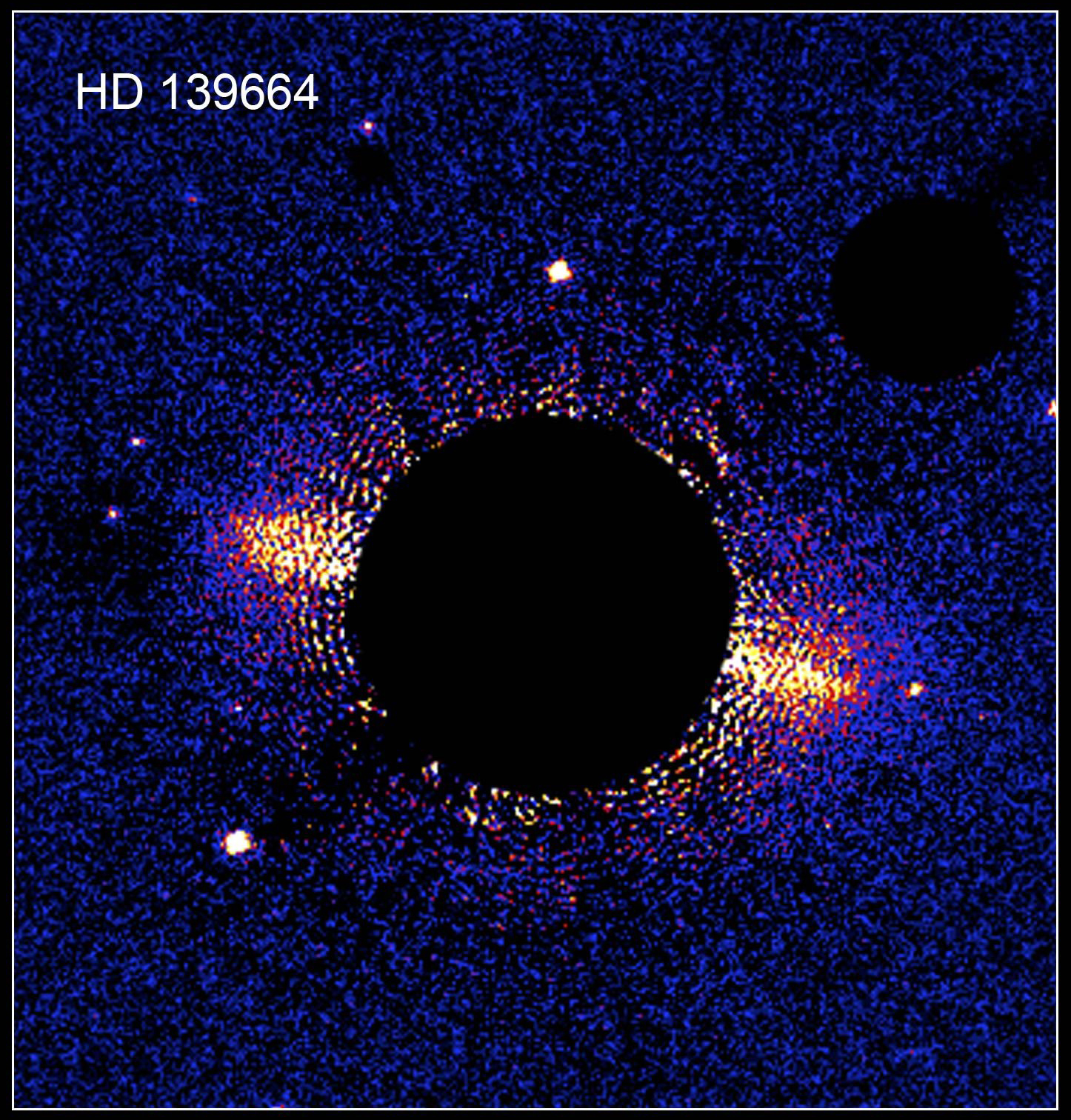
ACS image of debris disk around HD 139664. Credit: NASA/ESA

A debris disk has been imaged around this star using the coronagraphic mode of the ACS instrument on the Hubble Space Telescope. The disk appears to have a dust maximum at 83 AU from the star and a sharp outer boundary at 109 AU. These features may be caused by gravitational perturbations from planets orbiting the star.

The HD 139664 planetary system
Companion (in order from star)	Mass	Semimajor axis (AU)	Orbital period (days)	Eccentricity	Inclination (°)	Radius
circumstellar disc	75+6 −4 AU				>80°	—
