= HD 53143 =

Star in the constellation Carina

- A millimetre image of the disk with the REASONS survey

Observation data Epoch J2000 Equinox ICRS
- Constellation: Carina
- A
- Right ascension: 06^{h} 59^{m} 59.65505^{s}
- Declination: −61° 20′ 10.2526″
- Apparent magnitude (V): 6.80
- B
- Right ascension: 06^{h} 59^{m} 56.17524^{s}
- Declination: −61° 44′ 59.8415″

Characteristics

A
- Evolutionary stage: main sequence
- Spectral type: G9 V
- U−B color index: +0.43
- B−V color index: +0.80

B
- Evolutionary stage: Red dwarf
- Spectral type: M5.0
- Variable type: Flare star

Astrometry

A
Radial velocity (R_{v})	+21.3 km/s
Proper motion (μ)	RA: −161.873 mas/yr Dec.: +264.836 mas/yr
Parallax (π)	54.5252±0.0145 mas
Distance	59.82 ± 0.02 ly (18.340 ± 0.005 pc)
Absolute magnitude (M_{V})	6.30

B
Proper motion (μ)	RA: −159.849 mas/yr Dec.: +263.734 mas/yr
Parallax (π)	54.1045±0.0245 mas
Distance	60.28 ± 0.03 ly (18.483 ± 0.008 pc)

Details

A
Radius	0.85±0.02 R_{☉}
Luminosity	0.7 L_{☉}
Temperature	5,224 K
Metallicity [Fe/H]	0.22 dex
Rotation	9.6±0.1 days
Rotational velocity (v sin i)	4.0±1.0 km/s
Age	1.01±0.13 Gyr

B
Mass	0.129±0.004 M_{☉}
Radius	0.160±0.005 R_{☉}
Luminosity	(1.46±0.04)×10^{−3} L_{☉}
Surface gravity (log g)	5.15 cgs
Temperature	2,979±81 K
Rotation	0.336186 days

Other designations
- A: GJ 260, CD−61°1535, HD 53143, LTT 2715, SAO 249700, HIP 33690
- B: TIC 167812509, 2MASS J06595620-6145001, WISE J065955.94-614457.0

Database references
SIMBAD	A
- B

HD 53143 is a binary star in the constellation Carina, located 59.8 light-years (18.3 parsecs) from the Earth. With an apparent visual magnitude of 6.80, this star is a challenge to view with the naked eye even under ideal viewing conditions.

== Characteristics ==
The components of this binary system are separated by 2.48'.

Using the technique of gyrochronology, which measures the age of a low-mass star based on its rotation, HD 53143 A is about 1,010±130 million years old. Depending on the source, the stellar classification for this star is G9 V or K1V, placing it near the borderline between G-type and K-type main sequence stars. In either case, it is generating energy through the thermonuclear fusion of hydrogen at its core. This star is smaller than the Sun, with about 85% of the Sun's radius. It is emitting only 70% of the Sun's luminosity. The effective temperature of the star's outer envelope is cooler than the Sun at 5,224 K, giving it a golden-orange hue.

The secondary has a spectral class of M5.0. It is a red dwarf with 13% of the Sun's mass, 16% of the Sun's radius and only 0.15% of the luminosity of the Sun. It is a flare star.

== Debris disk ==
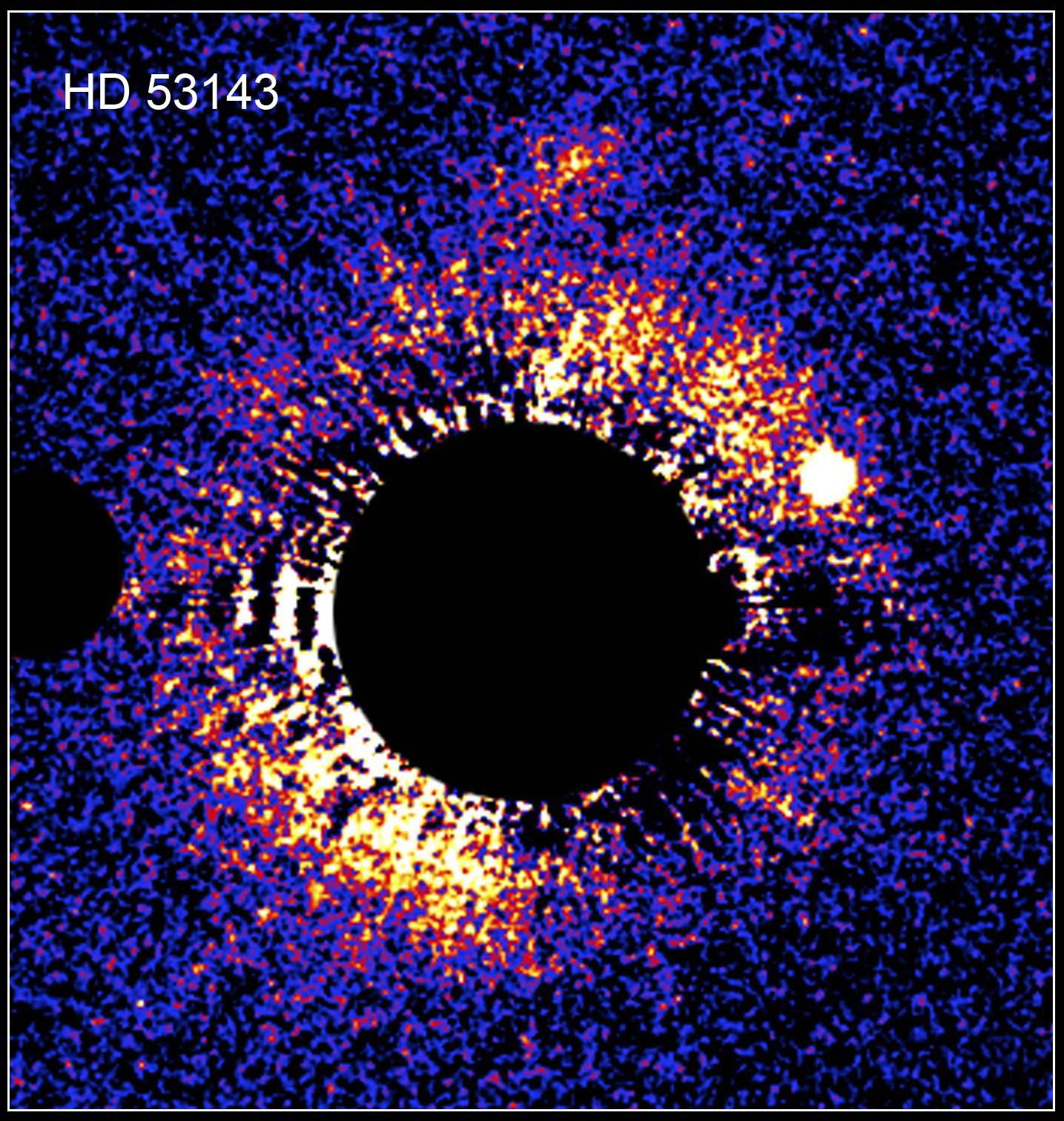
Debris disk around the star HD 53143 by the Hubble Space Telescope. The star itself has been hidden by the camera coronograph to make the disk visible.

Based upon an excess of infrared emission, a circumstellar debris disk has been found around the primary. This disk is inclined at an angle of about 40–50° to the line of sight from the Earth and it has an estimated mass of more than 7×10^{20} kg. (For comparison, the mass of the Moon is 7.3477×10^{22} kg.) This is one of the oldest known debris disk systems and hence may be replenished through the collision of larger bodies. The observed inner edge of the disk is at a distance of 55 Astronomical Units (AU) from the host star, while it stretches out to twice that distance, or 110 AU. This debris disk may extend outside this range, as the measurements are limited by the sensitivity of the instruments. The dust appears evenly distributed with no indication of clumping. The eccentricity of the ring is also one of the highest known, at 0.21.
