= HD 15115 =

F-type subgiant star in the constellation Cetus

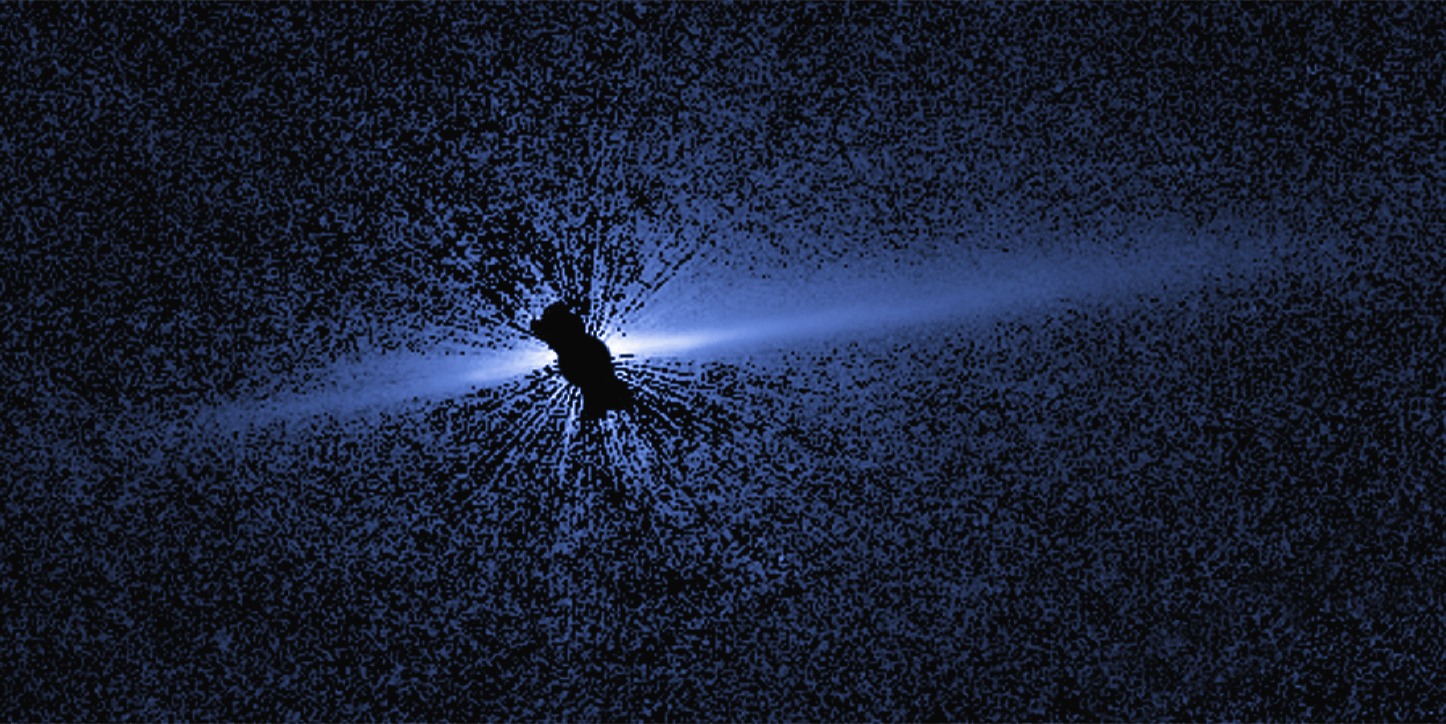
- Debris disk surrounding young star HD 15115; Credit: NASA, ESA, G. Schneider (University of Arizona), and the HST/GO 12228 Team

Observation data Epoch J2000 Equinox ICRS
- Constellation: Cetus
- Right ascension: 02^{h} 26^{m} 16.24578^{s}
- Declination: +06° 17′ 33.1865″
- Apparent magnitude (V): 6.76

Characteristics
- Evolutionary stage: main sequence
- Spectral type: F4IV or F2V
- U−B color index: −0.03
- B−V color index: +0.39

Astrometry
Radial velocity (R_{v})	0.81±0.12 km/s
Proper motion (μ)	RA: +88.013 mas/yr Dec.: −50.419 mas/yr
Parallax (π)	20.5026±0.0293 mas
Distance	159.1 ± 0.2 ly (48.77 ± 0.07 pc)
Absolute magnitude (M_{V})	+3.52

Details
Mass	1.19 M_{☉}
Radius	1.39±0.06 R_{☉}
Luminosity	3.74±0.01 L_{☉}
Surface gravity (log g)	4.30 cgs
Temperature	6,811+148 −152 K
Metallicity [Fe/H]	0.96 dex
Rotational velocity (v sin i)	89.8 km/s
Age	500 Myr

Other designations
- BD+05°338, HD 15115, HIP 11360, SAO 110532, WDS J02263+0618A

Database references
SIMBAD	data

HD 15115 is a single star in the equatorial constellation of Cetus. It is readily visible in binoculars or a small telescope, but is considered too dim to be seen with the naked eye at an apparent visual magnitude of 6.76. The distance to this object is 159 light years based on parallax, and it is slowly drifting further away at the rate of about 1 km/s. It has been proposed as a member of the Beta Pictoris moving group or the Tucana-Horologium association of co-moving stars; there is some ambiguity as to its true membership.

This object has a stellar classification of F4IV, suggesting it is an aging subgiant star that has exhausted the supply of hydrogen at its core. MacGregor and associates (2015) instead classify it as a young F-type main-sequence star with a class of F2V. Age estimates give a value of 500 million years, while membership in the β Pictoris moving group would indicate an age of around 21±4 million. It has 1.19 times the mass of the Sun, 1.39 times the Sun's radius, and has a relatively high rate of spin with a projected rotational velocity of 90 km/s. The star is radiating 3.74 times the luminosity of the Sun from its photosphere at an effective temperature of 6,811 K. Its metallicity – the abundance of elements other than hydrogen and helium – is nearly the same as in the Sun.

HD 15115 was shown to have an asymmetric debris disk surrounding it, which is being viewed nearly edge-on. The reason for the asymmetry is thought to be either the gravitational pull of a passing star (HIP 12545), an exoplanet, or interaction with the local interstellar medium. A magnitude 11.35 visual companion lies at an angular separation of 12.6″ along a position angle of 195°, as of 2015.
