= Fomalhaut b =

Extrasolar object orbiting Fomalhaut

Fomalhaut b Dagon
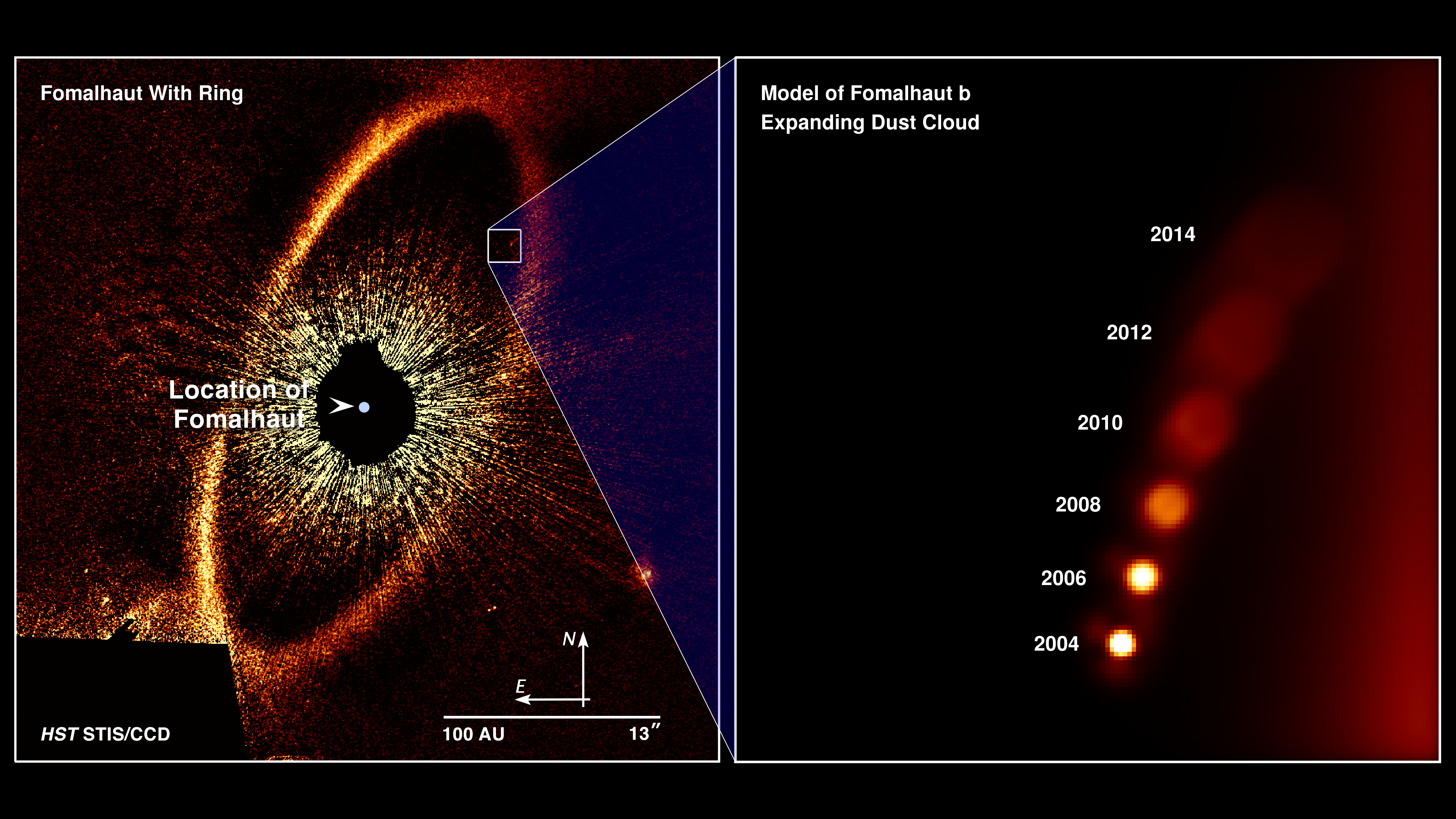
- Fomalhaut b as observed from 2004 to 2014. Previously thought to be an exoplanet, it is now known to be an expanding dust cloud.

Discovery
- Discovered by: Kalas et al.
- Discovery site: Hubble Space Telescope
- Discovery date: November 13, 2008
- Detection method: Direct imaging

Designations
- Alternative names: Dagon

Orbital characteristics
- Star: Fomalhaut

Fomalhaut b, formally named Dagon (/ˈdeɪɡən/), is an expanding dust cloud and former candidate planet observed near the A-type main-sequence star Fomalhaut, approximately 25 light-years away in the constellation of Piscis Austrinus. The object's discovery was initially announced in 2008 and confirmed in 2012 via images taken with the Advanced Camera for Surveys (ACS) on the Hubble Space Telescope. Under the working hypothesis that the object was a planet, it was reported in January 2013 that it had a highly elliptical orbit with a period of 1,700 Earth years. The object was one of those selected by the International Astronomical Union as part of NameExoWorlds, their public process for giving proper names to exoplanets. The process involved public nomination and voting for the new name. In December 2015, the IAU announced the winning name was Dagon.

The planetary hypothesis has since fallen out of favor; more gathered data suggested a dust or debris cloud is far more likely, and the object was placed on an escape trajectory. In 2023, a team of researchers used the James Webb Space Telescope's MIRI to probe the complex dust environment around Fomalhaut. They discovered a new intermediate dust belt that might be shepherded by an unseen planet and suggested that the blob, Fomalhaut b, could have originated in this belt. The recent research of the Fomalhaut system used the JWST's NIRCam equipped with coronagraphs to probe the complex dust ring in different wavelengths of infrared light. The absence of detection in certain wavelengths supports the idea that Fomalhaut b is not a massive planet but rather a dust cloud resulting from a collision among planetesimals.

== History of observations ==
=== Initial discovery by Hubble ===
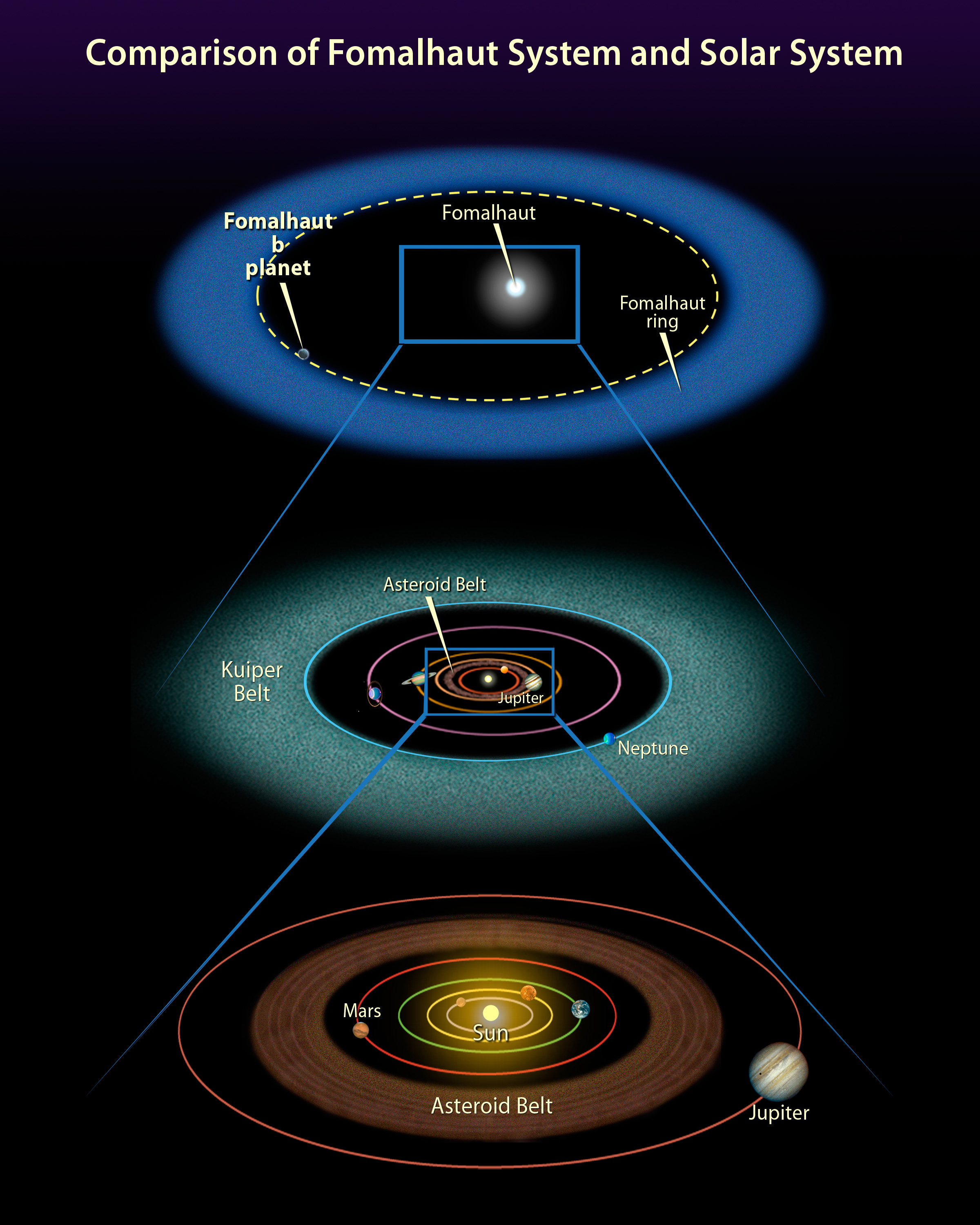
Comparison between the Solar System and the system around Fomalhaut

The existence of a massive planet orbiting Fomalhaut was first inferred from Hubble observations published in 2005 that resolved the structure of Fomalhaut's massive, cold debris disk (or dust belt/ring). The belt is not centered on the star, and has a sharper inner boundary than would normally be expected. The initial theory was that a massive planet on a wide orbit but located interior to this debris ring could clear out parent bodies and dust in its vicinity, leaving the ring appearing to have a sharp inner edge and making it appear offset from the star.

In May 2008, Paul Kalas, James Graham and their collaborators identified Fomalhaut b from Hubble/ACS images taken in 2004 and 2006 at visible wavelengths (i.e. 0.6 and 0.8 μm). NASA released the composite discovery photograph on November 13, 2008, coinciding with the publication of discovery by Kalas et al. in Science.

Kalas remarked, "It's a profound and overwhelming experience to lay eyes on a planet never before seen. I nearly had a heart attack at the end of May when I confirmed that Fomalhaut b orbits its parent star." In the image, the bright outer oval band is the dust ring, while the features inside of this band represent noise from scattered starlight.

=== Early follow-up observations and doubts ===
In the discovery paper, Kalas and collaborators suggested that Fomalhaut b's emission originates from two sources: from circumplanetary dust scattering starlight and from planet thermal emission. Here, the former explains most of the 0.6 μm brightness and planet thermal emission contributes to much of the 0.8 μm brightness. Their non-detections with ground-based infrared data suggested that Fomalhaut b could not be more massive than about three times Jupiter's mass if it were a planet.

However, Fomalhaut b should be detectable in space-based infrared data if it is a planet and has a mass between 1–3 times Jupiter's mass. On the contrary, observations from the infrared-sensitive Spitzer Space Telescope failed to detect Fomalhaut b, implying that Fomalhaut b has less mass than Jupiter if it is a planet. Furthermore, although Fomalhaut b was thought to be a plausible explanation for Fomalhaut's eccentric debris ring, measurements in the Kalas et al. paper hinted that it was moving too fast (i.e. not apsidally aligned) for this explanation to work. Finally, researchers analyzing September–October 2011 data from the ALMA for Fomalhaut's debris ring suggested an alternate hypothesis: that the ring could be shaped by much smaller, shepherding planets, neither of which needed to be Fomalhaut b. These results invoked skepticism about Fomalhaut b's status as an extrasolar planet.

=== Recovery and independent confirmation by Hubble ===
On October 24, 2012, a team led by Thayne Currie at the University of Toronto announced the first independent recovery of Fomalhaut b and revived the claim that Fomalhaut b was a planet. They reanalyzed the original Hubble data using new, more powerful algorithms for separating planet light from starlight and confirmed that Fomalhaut b does exist. They also provided a new detection of Fomalhaut b at 0.4 μm. They modeled the optical detection and infrared upper limits for Fomalhaut b, showing that Fomalhaut b's emission can be completely explained by starlight scattered by small dust and arguing that this dust surrounds an unseen planetary-mass object. Thus, they consider Fomalhaut b to plausibly be a "planet identified from direct imaging" even if Fomalhaut b is not, strictly speaking, a directly imaged planet insofar as the light does not come from a planetary atmosphere.

A second paper made public a day later and led by Raphael Galicher and Christian Marois at the Herzberg Institute of Astrophysics also independently recovered Fomalhaut b and confirmed the new 0.4 μm detection, claiming the spectral energy distribution (SED) of Fomalhaut b cannot be explained as due to direct or scattered radiation from a massive planet. They considered two models to explain the SED: (1) a large circumplanetary disk around a massive, but unseen, planet and (2) the aftermath of a collision during the past 100 years of two Kuiper belt objects of radii about 50 km.

Subsequent Hubble data obtained in 2010 and 2012 with the STIS instrument by Paul Kalas and collaborators again recovered Fomalhaut b. However, analysis of Fomalhaut b's astrometry showed that the object has a high eccentricity (e = 0.8), its orbit (projected on the sky) crosses the plane of Fomalhaut's debris ring, and thus it is unlikely to be the object sculpting the debris ring's sharp inner edge. Fomalhaut b's high eccentricity may be evidence for a significant dynamical interaction with a hitherto unseen planet at a smaller orbital separation.

The revival of the claim that Fomalhaut b was (possibly) a planet after it had been discounted led some to nickname the object a "zombie planet", although this is a non-technical term used in press material and does not appear in any peer-reviewed manuscript.

=== Confirmation as a debris cloud ===
Analyses of additional STIS data obtained in 2013 and 2014, published in 2020, found that Fomalhaut b is fading and expanding in size, a behavior that supports the interpretation of Fomalhaut b as a debris cloud from a collision between two asteroid-sized objects on an escape trajectory, rather than a planet. On May 7, 2020, the NASA Exoplanet Archive officially removed Fomalhaut b from its list of exoplanet candidates (confirmed or not).

Observations by the James Webb Space Telescope in 2023 did not detect Fomalhaut b in the infrared, confirming its nature as a dust cloud and not a planet.

== Physical characteristics ==
Fomalhaut b was hypothesized to be a gaseous, Jupiter-like planet, but the planet was disproven and confirmed to be a dust cloud.

== Other hypothesized planets ==
Based on the (now disproven) assumption that Fomalhaut b was a gaseous planet, the existence of additional planets closer to the star had been postulated. Fomalhaut b would be orbiting its host star at a wide separation, where forming massive planets is difficult. To explain its current location, Fomalhaut b would have had to be dynamically scattered by a more massive, unseen body located at smaller separations. Several ground-based observations have searched for this hypothetical Fomalhaut "c", but have yet to find it. At very small, Solar-System-like scales, any additional companions must have a mass less than thirteen times that of Jupiter. At slightly larger scales, comparable to the locations of the planets around HR 8799, any additional planets of Fomalhaut must have masses below about 2 to 7 Jupiter masses. A gaseous planet in an orbit like Fomalhaut b could have formed in situ if it coalesced from small pebble-sized objects that rapidly formed into a protoplanetary core which in turn accreted a gaseous envelope.

In observations taken in May 2023 with the James Webb Space Telescope's NIRCam and NIRSpec instruments, researchers identified ten sources within the dusty rings of the Fomalhaut system. One of these, informally dubbed S7, could be a planet in orbit around Fomalhaut. The upcoming Cycle 2 follow-up program aims to determine whether S7 is a background galaxy, brown dwarf, or a Jovian mass planet. Longer duration observations are anticipated to enhance signal strength and reduce noise, potentially enabling detection of smaller objects. This effort seeks to reduce the detection limit from approximately 0.6 Jupiter masses to around 0.3–0.4 Jupiter masses. Subsequent JWST observations aim to verify or dismiss the existence of S7. Furthermore, the Cycle 2 program may clarify S7's association with Fomalhaut and identify additional planets hinted at by the complex disk structure revealed in the MIRI results, as outlined by the authors.

== Gallery ==
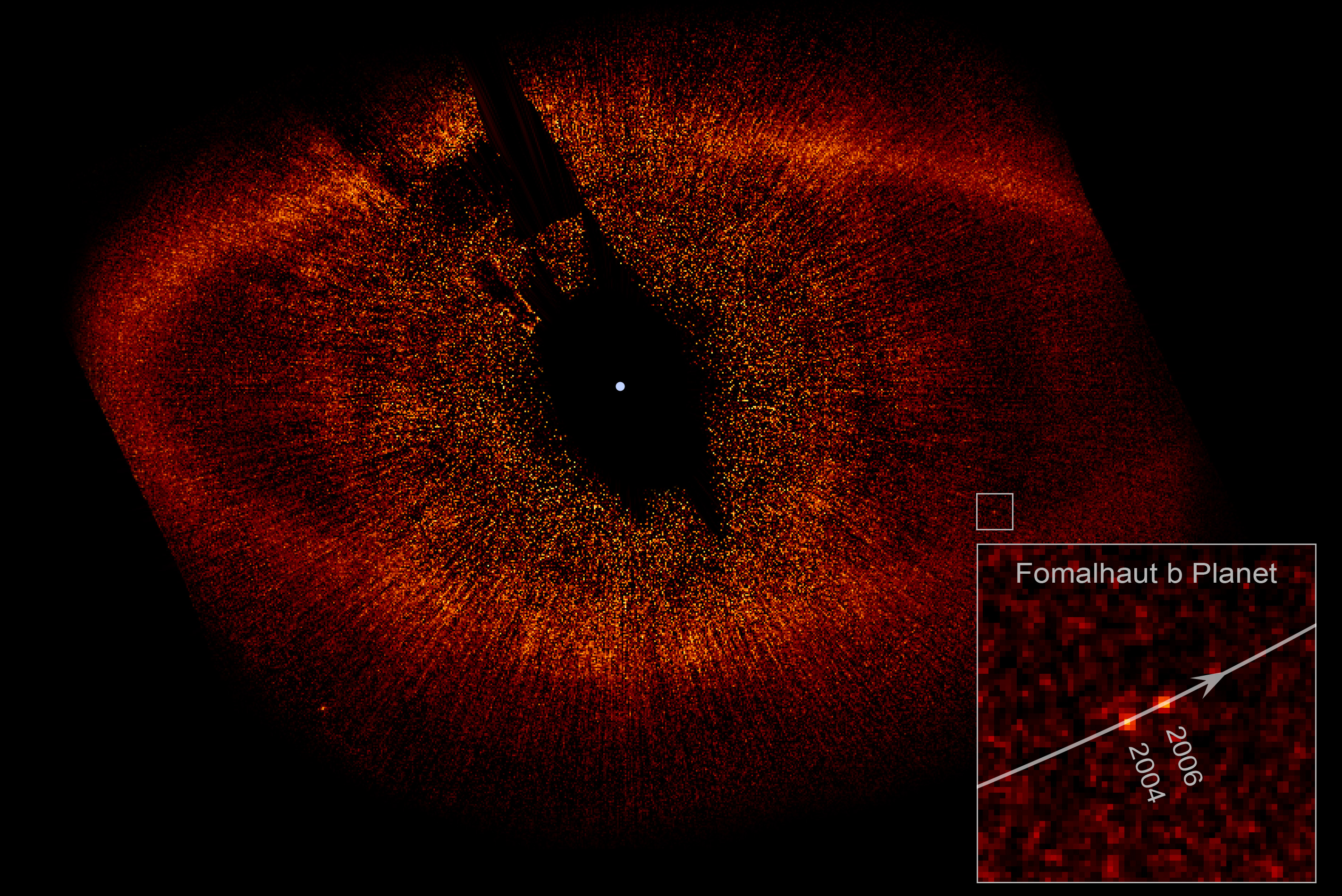
Fomalhaut b as observed from 2004 to 2006 (discovery image)

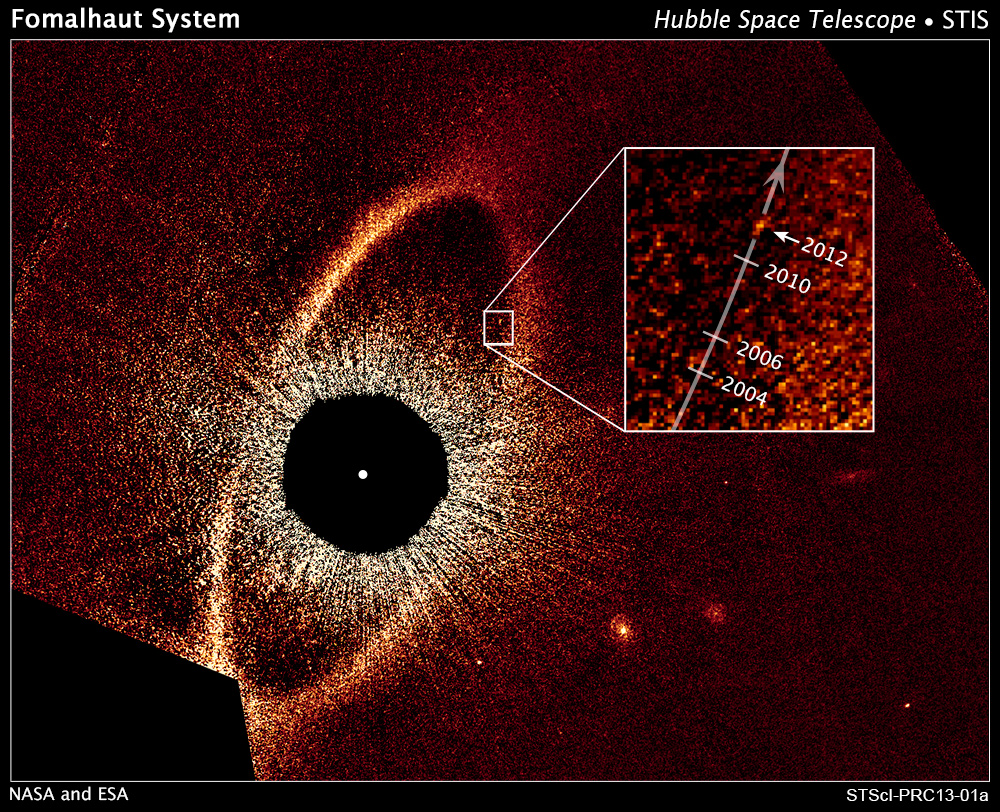
Fomalhaut b as observed from 2004 to 2012

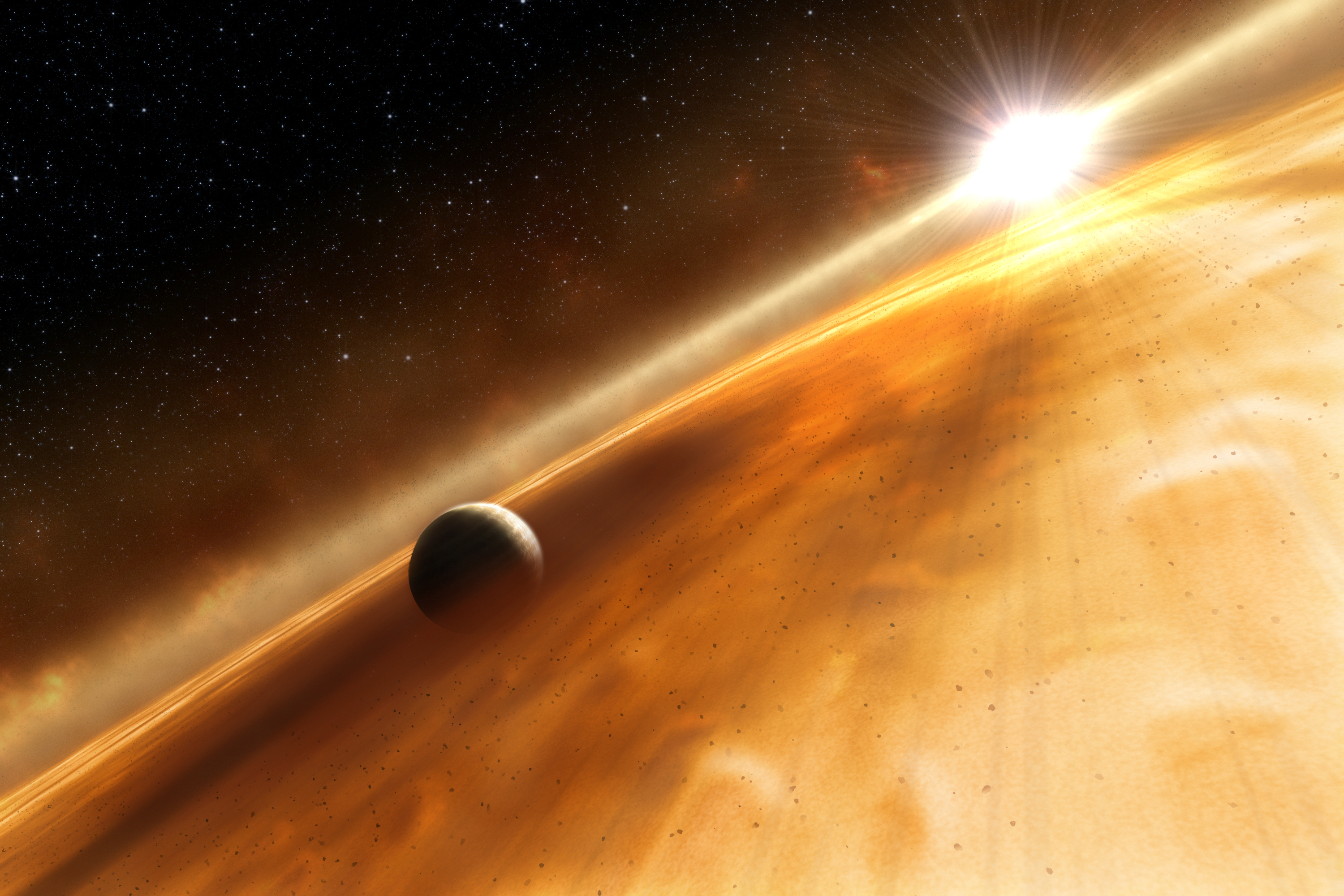
Artistic rendition of Fomalhaut b as a planet revolving around its parent star, a model which has now been disproven

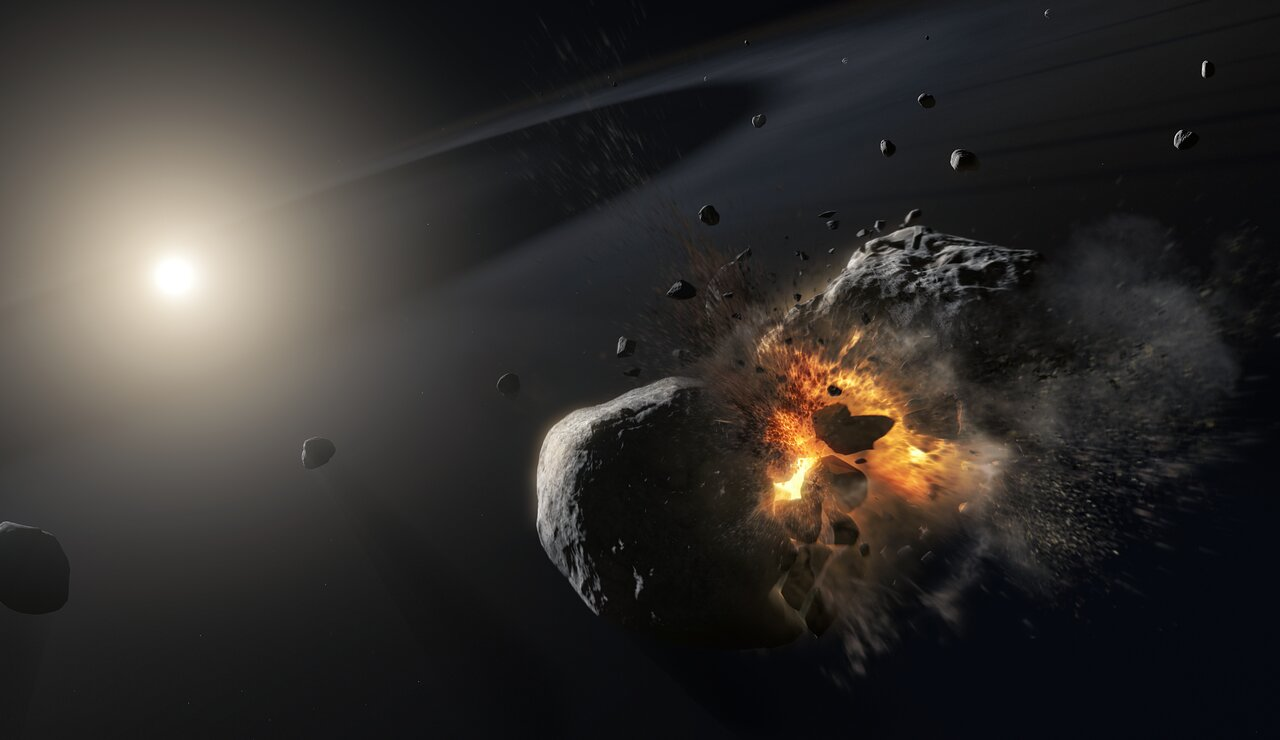
Visualisation of Fomalhaut and Fomalhaut b (artist's impression)

== See also ==
- Direct imaging of extrasolar planets
- Lists of exoplanets
- List of star systems within 25–30 light-years
