= Debris disk =

Disk of dust and debris in orbit around a star

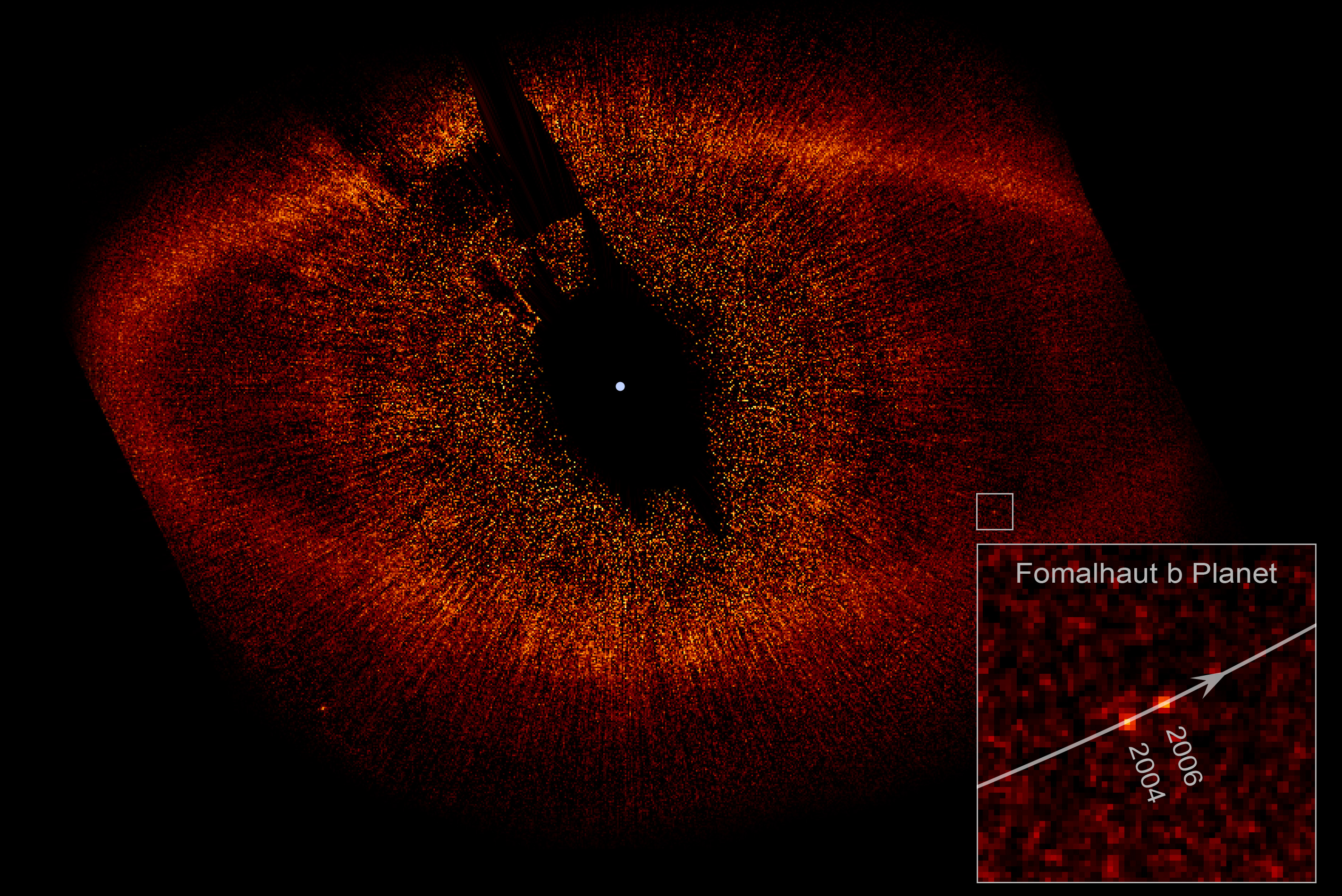
Hubble Space Telescope observation of the debris ring around Fomalhaut. The inner edge of the disk may have been shaped by the orbit of Fomalhaut b, at lower right.

A debris disk (American English), or debris disc (Commonwealth English), is a circumstellar disk of dust and debris in orbit around a star. Sometimes these disks contain prominent rings, as seen in the image of Fomalhaut on the right. Debris disks are found around stars with mature planetary systems, including at least one debris disk in orbit around an evolved neutron star. Debris disks can also be produced and maintained as the remnants of collisions between planetesimals, otherwise known as asteroids and comets.

As of 2001, more than 900 candidate stars had been found to possess a debris disk. They are usually discovered by examining the star system in infrared light and looking for an excess of radiation beyond that emitted by the star. This excess is inferred to be radiation from the star that has been absorbed by the dust in the disk, then re-radiated away as infrared energy.

Debris disks are often described as massive analogs to the debris in the Solar System. Most known debris disks have radii of 10–100 astronomical units (AU); they resemble the Kuiper belt in the Solar System, although the Kuiper belt does not have a high enough dust mass to be detected around even the nearest stars. Some debris disks contain a component of warmer dust located within 10 AU from the central star. This dust is sometimes called exozodiacal dust by analogy to zodiacal dust in the Solar System.

== Observation history ==
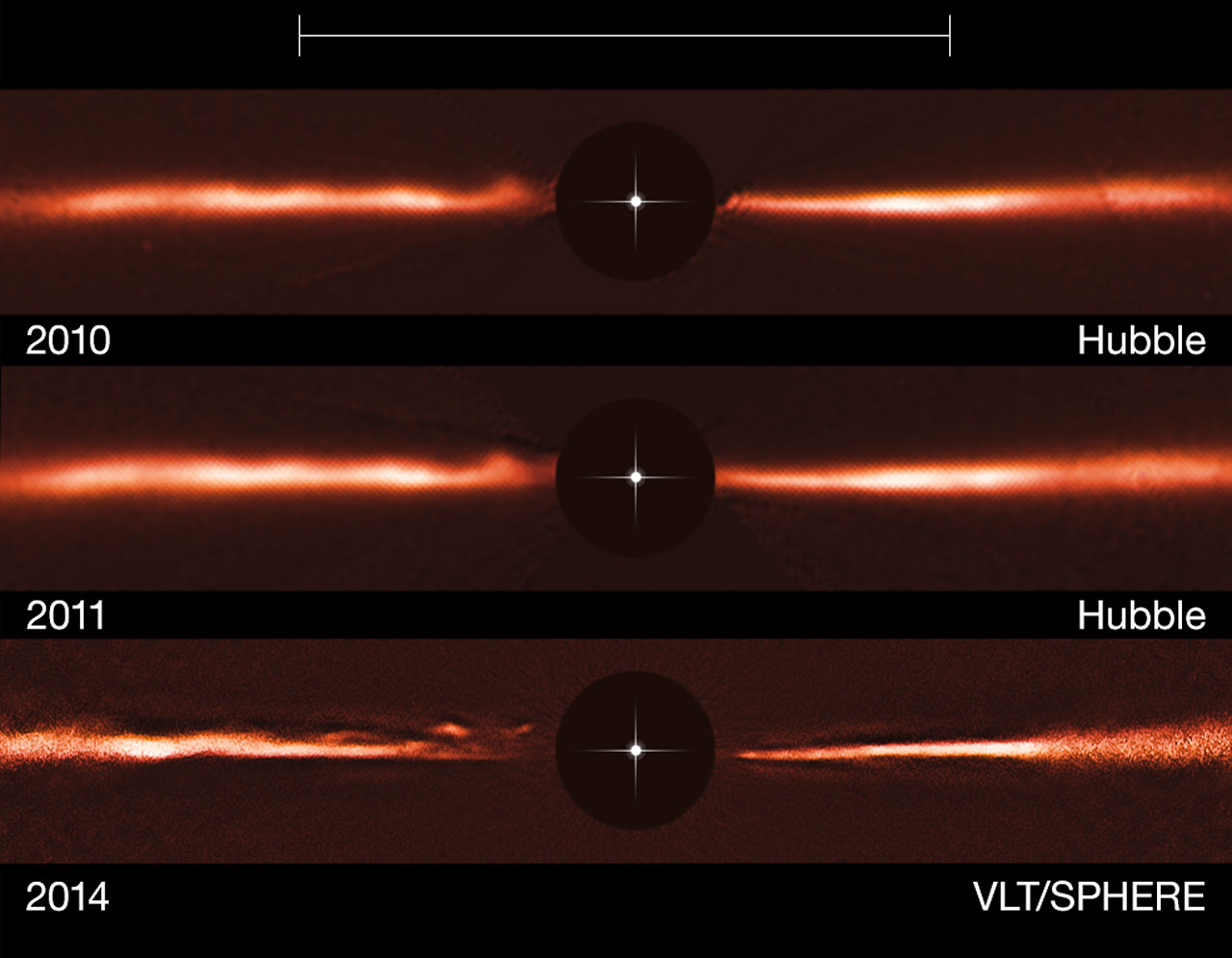
VLT and Hubble images of the disc around AU Microscopii.

In 1984 a debris disk was detected around the star Vega using the IRAS satellite. Initially this was believed to be a protoplanetary disk, but it is now known to be a debris disk due to the lack of gas in the disk and the age of the star. The first four debris disks discovered with IRAS are known as the "fabulous four": Vega, Beta Pictoris, Fomalhaut, and Epsilon Eridani. Subsequently, direct images of the Beta Pictoris disk showed irregularities in the dust, which were attributed to gravitational perturbations by an unseen exoplanet. That explanation was confirmed with the 2008 discovery of the exoplanet Beta Pictoris b.

Other exoplanet-hosting stars, including the first discovered by direct imaging (HR 8799), are known to also host debris disks. The nearby star 55 Cancri, a system that is also known to contain five planets, also was reported to have a debris disk, but that detection could not be confirmed. Structures in the debris disk around Epsilon Eridani suggest perturbations by a planetary body in orbit around that star, which may be used to constrain the mass and orbit of the planet.

On 24 April 2014, NASA reported detecting debris disks in archival images of several young stars, HD 141943 and HD 191089, first viewed between 1999 and 2006 with the Hubble Space Telescope, by using newly improved imaging processes.

In 2021, observations of a star, VVV-WIT-08, that became obscured for a period of 200 days may have been the result of a debris disk passing between the star and observers on Earth. Two other stars, Epsilon Aurigae and TYC 2505-672-1, are reported to be eclipsed regularly and it has been determined that the phenomenon is the result of disks orbiting them in varied periods, suggesting that VVV-WIT-08 may be similar and have a much longer orbital period that just has been experienced by observers on Earth. VVV-WIT-08 is ten times the size of the Sun in the constellation of Sagittarius.

== Origin ==
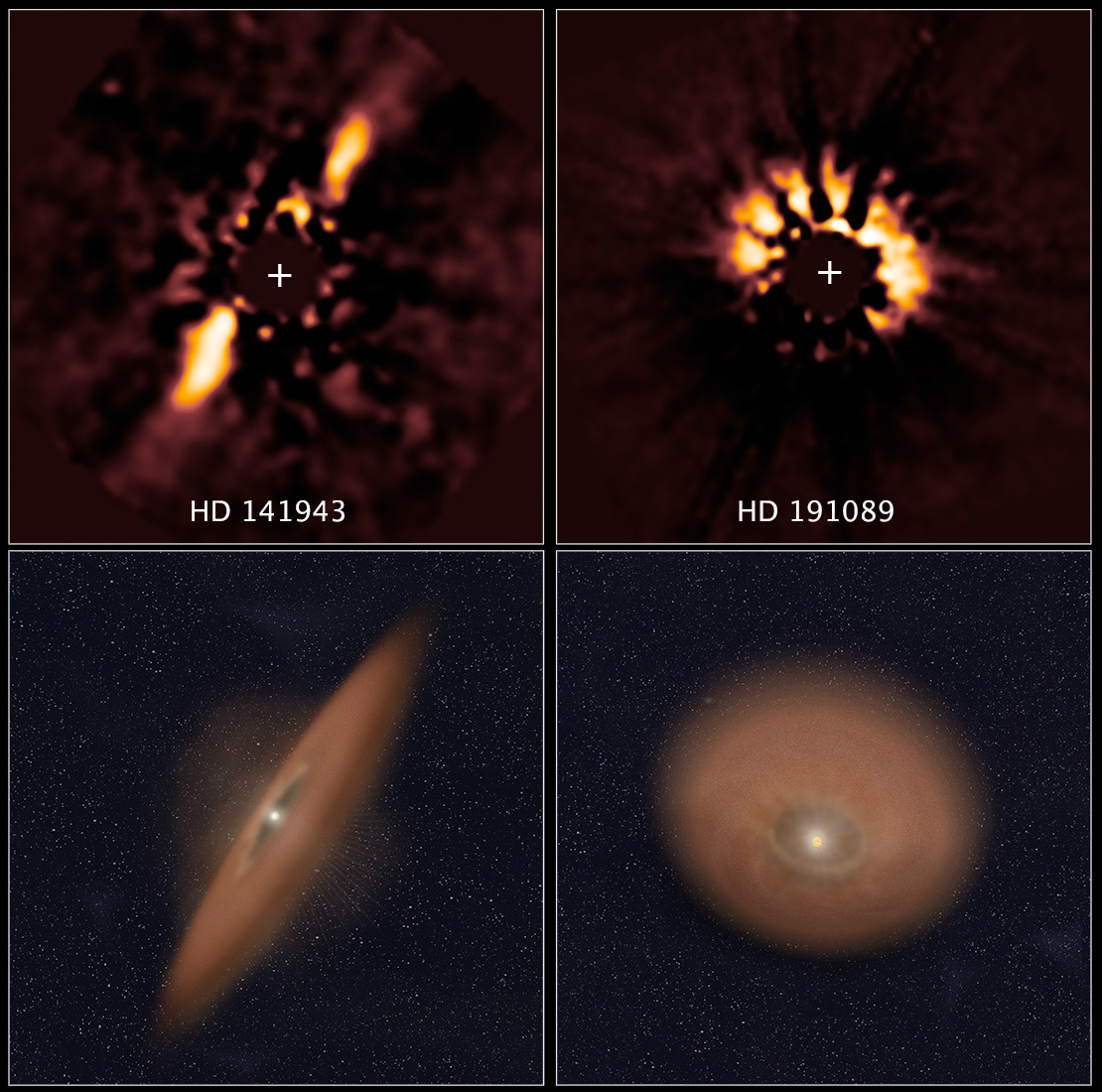
Debris disks detected in HST archival images of young stars, HD 141943 and HD 191089, using improved imaging processes (24 April 2014).

During the formation of a Sun-like star, the object passes through the T-Tauri phase during which it is surrounded by a gas-rich, disk-shaped nebula. Out of this material are formed planetesimals, which can continue accreting other planetesimals and disk material to form planets. The nebula continues to orbit the pre-main-sequence star for a period of 1–20 million years until it is cleared out by radiation pressure and other processes. Second generation dust may then be generated about the star by collisions between the planetesimals, which forms a disk out of the resulting debris. At some point during their lifetime, at least 45% of these stars are surrounded by a debris disk, which then can be detected by the thermal emission of the dust using an infrared telescope. Repeated collisions may cause a disk to persist for much of the lifetime of a star.

Typical debris disks contain small grains 1–100 μm in size. Collisions will grind down these grains to sub-micrometre sizes, which will be removed from the system by radiation pressure from the host star. In very tenuous disks such as the ones in the Solar System, the Poynting–Robertson effect can cause particles to spiral inward instead. Both processes limit the lifetime of the disk to 10 Myr or less. Thus, for a disk to remain intact, a process is needed to continually replenish the disk. This can occur, for example, by means of collisions between larger bodies, followed by a cascade that grinds down the objects to the observed small grains.

For collisions to occur in a debris disk, the bodies must be gravitationally perturbed sufficiently to create relatively large collisional velocities. A planetary system around the star can cause such perturbations, as can a binary star companion or the close approach of another star. The presence of a debris disk may indicate a high likelihood of exoplanets orbiting the star. Furthermore, many debris disks also show structures within the dust (for example, clumps and warps or asymmetries) that point to the presence of one or more exoplanets within the disk. The presence or absence of asymmetries in our own trans-Neptunian belt remains controversial although they might exist.

== Extreme debris disks ==
A sub-type of debris disk is the so-called "extreme debris disk" (EDD). This type is defined as exceeding 1% of the luminosity of the star in the infrared. An EDD is surrounded by warm dust (200-600 Kelvin), that orbits the star within a few astronomical units. In other words the dust is present in a region where terrestrial planets form. EDDs are rare and around 24 are known as of 2024. Infrared spectra with Spitzer have shown that the dust is dominated by small particles made up of silicates that have a size between sub-μm and a few μm. EDDs are interpreted to have formed from one or more giant collisions between large planetesimals or planetary bodies. This is different to most debris disks, which are sustained by smaller collisions. EDDs are often transient events, with the dust produced in the event lasting years around the star before radiation pressure blows the small particles away. 2MASS J08090250-4858172 was one of the first such systems with observed infrared variability, showing two giant impact events in 2012 and 2014. In rare cases the dust cloud can orbit in front of the star, causing dips of brightness in the optical. One such system is HD 166191, which shows a star-sized dust cloud transiting in front of the star. Giant impacts are more common in young systems and after around 300 Myrs giant impacts become less common. A few relative old EDDs are also known, reaching up to 5.5 Gyrs. These old EDDs often have a wide, eccentric companion, which might help trigger such giant impact events. Giant impacts might not always be detectable as EDDs. Such disks are made up of two types of dust. The first type is vapor condensates that is produced immediately in the event. The second type is dust created by the grinding down of boulders produced in the event. Simulations have shown that boulders are more important to classify disks as extreme.

== Known belts ==
Belts of dust or debris have been detected around many stars, including the Sun, including the following:

Star	Spectral class	Distance (ly)	Orbit (AU)	Notes
Epsilon Eridani	K2V	10.5	35–75	
Tau Ceti	G8V	11.9	35–50	
Vega	A0V	25	86–200	
Fomalhaut	A3V	25	133–158	
AU Microscopii	M1Ve	33	50–150	
HD 181327	F5.5V	51.8	89-110	
HD 69830	K0V	41	<1	
HD 207129	G0V	52	148–178	
HD 139664	F5IV–V	57	60–109	
Eta Corvi	F2V	59	100–150	
HD 53143	K1V	60	?	
Beta Pictoris	A6V	63	25–550	
Zeta Leporis	A2Vann	70	2–8	
HD 92945	K1V	72	45–175	
HD 107146	G2V	88	130	
Gamma Ophiuchi	A0V	95	520	
HR 8799	A5V	129	75	
51 Ophiuchi	B9	131	0.5–1200	
HD 12039	G3–5V	137	5	
HD 98800	K5e (?)	150	1	
HD 15115	F2V	150	315–550	
HR 4796 A	A0V	220	200	
HD 141569	B9.5e	320	400	
HD 113766 A	F4V	430	0.35–5.8	
HD 141943				
HD 191089				

The orbital distance of the belt is an estimated mean distance or range, based either on direct measurement from imaging or derived from the temperature of the belt. The Earth has an average distance from the Sun of 1 AU.

== See also ==
- Accretion disk
- Asteroid belt
- Circumplanetary disk – Accumulation of matter around a planet
- Exoasteroid belt
- List of extrasolar planetary collisions
- Protoplanetary disk
