= Van Biesbroeck's star catalog =

In 1961 the astronomer George Van Biesbroeck published a catalog of low luminosity stars discovered using the 82 in (2.1 m) Otto Struve refractor telescope of the McDonald Observatory in Texas.

== Survey and catalog ==
This survey is similar to earlier dim star surveys that were done by Max Wolf and Frank Elmore Ross but using later equipment and techniques that could detect even fainter stars. The stars in this catalog are all low luminosity stars that appear near known high proper motion stars in the telescope's field of view. The high proper motion indicates that the stars are close enough to Earth for a dim star to be seen with a large telescope. Presuming that these high proper motion stars might be binary stars with dim, previously undetected, companions, he took astrophotographs of the space around these stars looking for low luminosity stars that shared the high proper motions of the primary star. In general, the primary stars were too dim for a direct measurement of their distance by measuring their parallax at that time.

The stars in this catalog are identified by the designation; VB.

The original list ended at 12 with most identified as gravitationally bound in a binary or multiple star system. He also identified an additional 17 known high proper motion stars he later found to have low luminosity stars in the field of view of the bright star. Many of these stars were found to be optical double stars, not gravitationally bound to another star, and not known to be part of a binary system.

Most of the stars in this catalog are type K and M, red dwarf, stars, some with exceptionally low mass and luminosity. Three of the stars are type DC, white dwarf, stars.

The star from this catalog that is known to be closest to Earth is VB 10, at about 19 light years distance.

Low-luminosity stars discovered (Note: VB 13-29 just appear near the listed "primary" stars and are not associated with them.)
| Number | Magnitude | Type | Right Ascension | Declination | Primary Star | Proper Motion | Parallax | Notes |
| VB 1 | 16.0 | M6V | 05 45 43.22 | -22 20 03.5 | Gamma Leporis | -237 -580 | | Background star, not physically associated |
| VB 2 | 14.86 | M | 06 06 30.57 | +04 30 32.7 | Ross 413 | 155 -790 | | |
| VB 3 | 16.59 | DC | 07 45 38.73 | -33 47 50.0 | GC 10473 | -271 1668 | 65.79 | |
| VB 4 | 15 | DC | 11 34 29.74 | -32 49 56.6 | GC 15873 | -591 731 | 104.5 | |
| VB 5 | 15.43 | M4 | 11 46 32.70 | -40 29 47.7 | GC 16149 | -1530 403 | | |
| VB 6 | 16 | | 11 58 26.54 | -41 55 06.3 | CD-41 6879 | -643 -367 | | |
| VB 7 | 15.23 | M7V | 14 00 26.62 | +47 39 59.1 | Ross 1027 | -619 -301 | | |
| VB 8 | 16.7 | M6.5V | 16 55 35.29 | -08 23 40.1 | Wolf 629/630 | -771 -871 | 153.96 | |
| VB 9 | 13.02 | M3.5 | 18 35 27.23 | +45 45 40.3 | LFT 1421 | 460 361 | 63 | |
| VB 10 | 17.30 | M8V | 19 16 57.62 | +05 09 02.2 | Wolf 1055 | -614 -1368 | 164.3 | Primary is incorrectly listed as Wolf 1085. |
| VB 11 | 16.68 | DC | 20 56 47.79 | -04 50 39.8 | Ross 193 | 787.22 -218.69 | 56.56 | |
| VB 12 | 16.96 | sdM3 | 23 17 05.00 | -13 51 04.1 | GC 32412 | -525 -1168 | | |
| VB 13 | 15 | M | 00 55 49.48 | -11 38 03.6 | L 796-10 | 288 -114 | | |
| VB 14 | 14.2 | M1 | 01 52 50.90 | -10 34 13.7 | Ross 555 | 346 123 | | |
| VB 15 | 15 | | 5 25 33.79 | -3 29 48.3 | BD -3 3110 | | | Primary coordinates do not agree. VB 15 is not listed in SIMBAD |
| VB 16 | 13.77 | M4 | 06 49 05.42 | +37 06 53.4 | LFT 487 | 201 -1586 | 72 | |
| VB 17 | 15 | | 07 33 11.03 | -42 49 31.3 | LFT 533 | 92 -552 | | |
| VB 18 | 17 | | 10 57 14.97 | +41 57 56.5 | Fu 29 | -274 -262 | | The primary is unidentified. |
| VB 19 | 18 | | 11 16 05.66 | +07 57 43.0 | Wolf 373 | 167 -293 | | |
| VB 20 | 10.91 | | 11 17 11.716 | +17 29 26.92 | LFT 789 | -304.84 -33.81 | 10.25 | |
| VB 21 | 14 | | 12 03 22.74 | +69 03 54.5 | LFT 880 | -265 44 | | |
| VB 22 | 15.5 | | 13 36 59.29 | +07 51 54.5 | Ross 491 | 372 -14 | | |
| VB 23 | 15 | | 14 50 38.26 | +07 20 52.3 | LFT 1146 | -202 55 | | |
| VB 24A | 12.48 | M3 | 15 40 03.53 | +43 29 39.7 | | 1171 -317 | 74.2 | |
| VB 24B | 13.80 | M3.5 | 15 40 03.74 | +43 29 35.5 | | 1171 -317 | 74.2 | |
| VB 25 | 14 | | 16 45 47.58 | +33 26 34.8 | BD 33 2777 | -146 -366 | | |
| VB 26 | 14.05 | K | 16 55 13.76 | -08 07 58.7 | BD -8 4352 | -243 -664 | | |
| VB 27 | 15 | M | 18 23 17.66 | +72 41 55.6 | Chi Draconis | -98 484 | | |
| VB 28 | 15 | | 18 41 58.73 | +31 40 17.0 | Ross 145 | -116 -216 | | |
| VB 29 | 13 | M | 21 27 47.51 | +55 05 33.7 | Ross 198 | 492 193 | | |

The original 1961 catalog has been updated for this table using the latest coordinates from SIMBAD as many of these objects have moved a considerable distance away from their 1961 positions. The original object designations for the primary stars are used but modified to be consistent with SIMBAD standards where necessary. One primary star was incorrectly identified and two primary stars could not be positively identified from the original catalog.

== Significance ==
This catalog of stars is significant not only for the intrinsic features of the stars themselves but also for the stars proximity to Earth. These low mass, low luminosity stars close by are uniquely situated for exo-planetary searches using astrometry or optical methods. The low mass of the star enables observers on Earth to see a large motion of the star for a given planetary mass. The low luminosity of the stars makes a direct optical or infrared telescopic survey for orbiting objects, such as planets, near the star possible.

A notable member of this group is VB 10, discovered in 1944. This star was the least massive and dimmest star known at the time of its discovery. Based on a discovery claim made in 2009, VB 10 would have become the first star to have an extrasolar planet detected using astrometry, however this claim was later refuted.

== See also ==
- List of least massive stars
