= Gliese 752 =

Binary star system in the constellation Aquila

- Location of Gliese 752 in the constellation Aquila

Observation data Epoch J2000 Equinox ICRS
- Constellation: Aquila
- Gliese 752 A
- Right ascension: 19^{h} 16^{m} 55.25657^{s}
- Declination: +05° 10′ 08.0406″
- Apparent magnitude (V): ~9.12
- Gliese 752 B
- Right ascension: 19^{h} 16^{m} 57.61096^{s}
- Declination: +05° 09′ 01.6009″
- Apparent magnitude (V): ~17.30

Characteristics

Gliese 752 A
- Spectral type: M2.5V
- Apparent magnitude (B): ~10.63
- Apparent magnitude (V): ~9.13
- Apparent magnitude (R): ~8.3
- Apparent magnitude (J): ~5.58
- Apparent magnitude (H): ~4.93
- Apparent magnitude (K): ~4.67
- Variable type: BY

Gliese 752 B
- Spectral type: M8V
- Apparent magnitude (B): ~19.42
- Apparent magnitude (V): ~17.30
- Apparent magnitude (R): ~15.6
- Apparent magnitude (J): 9.908 ± 0.025
- Apparent magnitude (H): 9.226 ± 0.026
- Apparent magnitude (K): 8.765 ± 0.022
- Variable type: UV

Astrometry

A
Radial velocity (R_{v})	35.33±0.13 km/s
Proper motion (μ)	RA: −579.081 mas/yr Dec.: −1,332.868 mas/yr
Parallax (π)	169.0615±0.0239 mas
Distance	19.292 ± 0.003 ly (5.9150 ± 0.0008 pc)
Absolute magnitude (M_{V})	10.26±0.005

B
Proper motion (μ)	RA: −598.761 mas/yr Dec.: −1,366.063 mas/yr
Parallax (π)	168.9537±0.0668 mas
Distance	19.304 ± 0.008 ly (5.919 ± 0.002 pc)
Absolute magnitude (M_{V})	18.7

Details

Gliese 752 A
Mass	0.484±0.019 M_{☉}
Radius	0.481±0.014 R_{☉}
Luminosity (bolometric)	0.0326 ± 0.0004 L_{☉}
Surface gravity (log g)	4.90±0.07 cgs
Temperature	3,534±51 K
Metallicity	−0.04±0.16
Rotation	50.60±0.41 d
Rotational velocity (v sin i)	<2 km/s

Gliese 752 B
Mass	0.0881+0.0026 −0.0024 M_{☉}
Radius	0.1183+0.0059 −0.0057 R_{☉}
Luminosity (bolometric)	0.000499±0.000004 L_{☉}
Temperature	2,508+63 −60 K
Age	~1 Gyr

Other designations
- BD+04°4048, GJ 752, CCDM J19169+0510, WDS J19169+0510
- Gliese 752 A: V1428 Aql, HD 180617, HIP 94761, Ross 652, Wolf 1055, TYC 472-1252-1, GSC 00472-01252, 2MASS J19165526+0510086
- Gliese 752 B: VB 10, Van Biesbroeck's Star, V1298 Aql, 2MASS J19165762+0509021

Database references
SIMBAD	A
- VB 10 (B)
Exoplanet Archive	data

Gliese 752 is a binary star system in the constellation Aquila. This system is relatively nearby, at a distance of 19.3 light-years (5.9 parsecs).

The Gliese 752 system consists of two M-type stars. The primary star is the magnitude 9 Gliese (GJ) 752 A. The secondary star is the dim magnitude 17 Gliese (GJ) 752 B, more commonly referred to as VB 10. This stellar pair form a binary star system separated by about 74 arc seconds (~434 AU). This system is also known for its high proper motion of about 1 arc second a year. Component A has one known exoplanet. The system is unusually close (3.85 light years) to the bright star Altair, which, when seen from the system would have an apparent magnitude of around −2.43, as bright as Jupiter is from earth. (Note: calculated using each star's distance, position in the sky, and brightness)

The name and number are from the Catalogue of Nearby Stars, published by German astronomer Wilhelm Gliese in 1969.

== Gliese 752 A characteristics ==
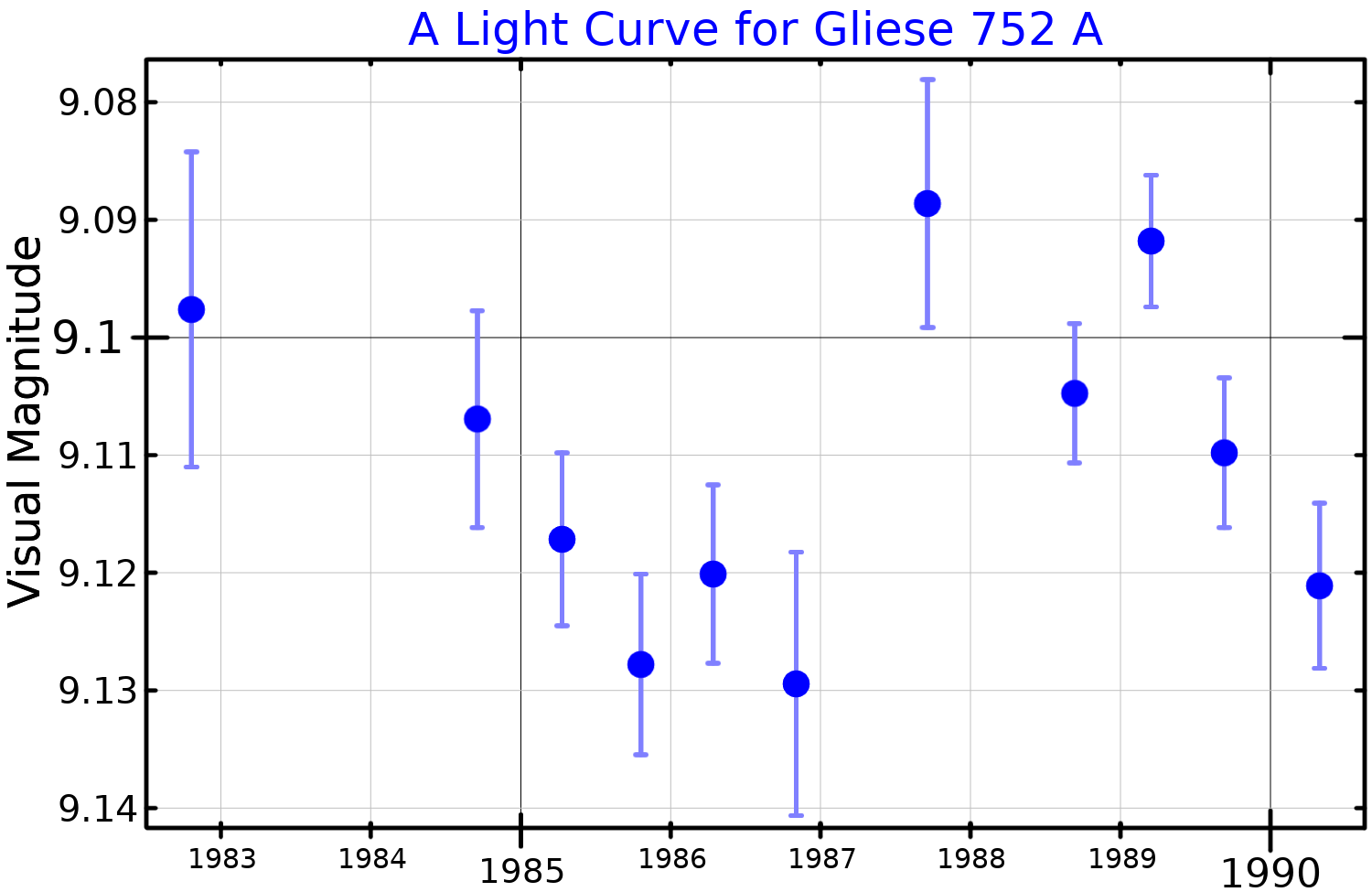
A visual band light curve for Gliese 752 A, adapted from Weis (1994)

The primary star, also known as Wolf 1055, is a type M2.5 red dwarf with about half the size and mass as the Sun and considerably cooler at 3,534±51 K. This star was first observed to be a high proper motion star by the German astronomer Max Wolf with his pioneering use of astrophotography. He added this star to his extensive catalog of such stars in 1919. It is a variable star with the variable star catalog name V1428 Aquilae. It is a BY Draconis type variable star subject to flare events.

== Planetary system ==
In August 2018, a group of scientists using measurements taken from the CARMENES spectrograph, on the Calar Alto Observatory located in Spain, announced they had detected a planet orbiting the larger of the stars, HD 180617 (Gliese 752 A). The measurements indicated the presence of a planet with a minimum mass comparable to Neptune on an orbit partly located within the habitable zone.

The HD 180617 (Gliese 752 A) planetary system
Companion (in order from star)	Mass	Semimajor axis (AU)	Orbital period (days)	Eccentricity	Inclination (°)	Radius
b	≥12.214±1.05 M_{🜨}	0.343±0.004	105.911±0.109	0.101±0.053	—	—

== Gliese 752 B characteristics ==
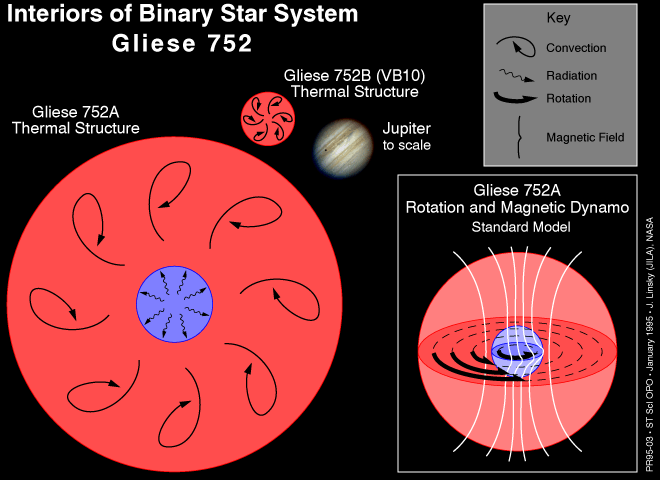
Diagram showing the relative sizes and internal dynamic processes of the two Gliese 752 stars

Gliese 752 was not known to be a binary star system until the discovery of a small dim secondary star by George Van Biesbroeck in 1944. This star is identified as VB 10 in Van Biesbroeck's star catalog. This star is notable for its very low mass. At .08 solar masses, it is near the lower mass limit for a star. It is also quite small at 10% of the solar radius. A type M8V red dwarf, the star is known for its very low luminosity (one of the least luminous stars yet observed) with an absolute magnitude of nearly 19, due to its very cool surface temperature of only 2600K. It is a variable star with the variable star catalog name V1298 Aquilae. This star is a UV Ceti type variable star also subject to flare events. It shares the large proper motion, along with the tendency to flare, with the primary star.

In 2009, the discovery of the extrasolar planet, VB 10b, was announced in orbit around this star. However a subsequent spectrographic survey failed to confirm the presence of any large planets in orbit around this star.

== Magnetic field ==
In 1994, the Hubble Space Telescope observed a solar flare on Gliese 752 B. This suggests that the star has a strong magnetic field, which came as a surprise to astronomers. It had previously been assumed that low mass red dwarfs would have insignificant or nonexistent magnetic fields. These tiny dwarfs are supposed to lack the radiative zone just outside the star's core that creates the magnetic field-creating dynamos in more massive stars like the Sun. Nevertheless, the detection of solar flares indicates that as yet unknown process allows low mass stars to produce sufficient magnetic fields to power such outbursts, even if solely by convection, without a radiative core.

== See also ==
- Binary star
- List of least massive stars
