= HD 102365 =

Binary star system in the constellation Centaurus

- Location of HD 102365 (circled in red)

Observation data Epoch J2000 Equinox ICRS
- Constellation: Centaurus
- A
- Right ascension: 11^{h} 46^{m} 31.07253^{s}
- Declination: −40° 30′ 01.2859″
- Apparent magnitude (V): 4.88
- B
- Right ascension: 11^{h} 46^{m} 32.68988^{s}
- Declination: −40° 29′ 47.6048″
- Apparent magnitude (V): 15

Characteristics
- Spectral type: G2V + M4V
- U−B color index: 0.10
- B−V color index: 0.67

Astrometry

A
Radial velocity (R_{v})	16.94±0.12 km/s
Proper motion (μ)	RA: −1530.971 mas/yr Dec.: +403.287 mas/yr
Parallax (π)	107.3024±0.0873 mas
Distance	30.40 ± 0.02 ly (9.319 ± 0.008 pc)
Absolute magnitude (M_{V})	5.07

B
Radial velocity (R_{v})	17.23±0.27 km/s
Proper motion (μ)	RA: −1534.679 mas/yr Dec.: +381.396 mas/yr
Parallax (π)	107.4237±0.0351 mas
Distance	30.362 ± 0.010 ly (9.309 ± 0.003 pc)

Details

A
Mass	0.79+0.03 −0.02 M_{☉}
Radius	0.99±0.02 R_{☉}
Luminosity	0.86±0.05 L_{☉}
Habitable zone inner limit	0.887 AU
Habitable zone outer limit	1.573 AU
Surface gravity (log g)	4.44±0.03 cgs
Temperature	5,594+49 −50 K
Metallicity [Fe/H]	−0.34±0.04 dex
Rotation	36.4±7.3 days
Rotational velocity (v sin i)	0.5 km/s
Age	11.0±0.9 Gyr

B
Mass	0.192 M_{☉}

Other designations
- 66 G. Cen, CD−39°7301, GJ 442, HD 102365, HIP 57443, HR 4523, SAO 223020, LHS 311, LTT 4373, PLX 2725.00
- B: LHS 313, VB 5

Database references
SIMBAD	A
- B
Exoplanet Archive	data
ARICNS	data

HD 102365 (66 G. Centauri) is a binary star system that is located in the northeastern part of the constellation Centaurus at a distance of about 30.4 light-years (9.3 parsecs) from the Solar System. The larger member of the system is a G-type star that is smaller than the Sun but of similar mass. It has a common proper motion companion that was discovered by W. J. Luyten in 1960. This M-type star appears to be in a wide orbit around the primary at a current separation of about 211 astronomical units (AU), (or 211 times the separation of the Earth from the Sun). By comparison, Neptune orbits at an average distance of 30 AU.

== Description ==
The stellar classification for the primary star in this system is G2V; the same as the Sun. That of the red dwarf companion is M4V. The primary star has an estimated 84% the mass of the Sun, 99% of the Sun's radius, and 86% of the Sun's luminosity. It is a slow rotator, with a projected rotational velocity of 0.5 km/s. The system is believed to be ancient, with modern estimates of the age between 11.0 and 13.1 billion years, over double that of the Solar System. Compared to the Sun, it only has about 52% of the abundance of elements other than hydrogen and helium; what astronomers term the metallicity of a star.

This star system has a relatively large proper motion. The HR 4523 system is presently located within the Epsilon Indi Moving Group, although it gives itself away as an interloper, since the star is older and has a different composition than the group members. It has space velocity components [U, V, W] = [−67, −40, +4] km/s.

== Search for planets ==
The primary star has been believed to be orbited by a Neptune-like planet with a minimum mass 9.3 times that of the Earth. The orbital period of this planet is 122.1 days. No other planets have been discovered orbiting this star. Initially detected in 2012 by Doppler spectroscopy (radial velocity method), a 2013 study was unable to confirm this planet, but it was detected again in a 2023 study. Evidence suggested the radial velocity variations are indeed caused from the orbital motion of a planet, and not from intrinsic processes arising from the star. However, it was again undetected in ESPRESSO observations taken by a 2025 study, which found evidence that the radial velocity variations instead arise from the star's magnetic field. Similarly, another 2025 paper also reported a non-detection. The NASA Exoplanet Archive demoted the planet to false positive status in April 2026.

An examination of this system in the infrared did not reveal an excess emission that would otherwise suggest the presence of a circumstellar debris disk.
