= LHS 2924 =

Red dwarf star in the constellation Boötes

Observation data Epoch J2000 Equinox ICRS
- Constellation: Boötes
- Right ascension: 14^{h} 28^{m} 43.2275^{s}
- Declination: +33° 10′ 39.259″
- Apparent magnitude (V): 19.35

Characteristics
- Spectral type: M9Ve
- Apparent magnitude (B): 21.2
- Apparent magnitude (R): 17.8
- Apparent magnitude (J): 11.99
- Apparent magnitude (H): 11.225
- Apparent magnitude (K): 10.744

Astrometry
Radial velocity (R_{v})	−39.14 km/s
Proper motion (μ)	RA: −346.961 mas/yr Dec.: −710.986 mas/yr
Parallax (π)	91.1634±0.0994 mas
Distance	35.78 ± 0.04 ly (10.97 ± 0.01 pc)
Absolute magnitude (M_{V})	19.15

Details
Mass	0.08 M_{☉}
Radius	0.107 R_{☉}
Luminosity (bolometric)	~0.00021 L_{☉}
Luminosity (visual, L_{V})	0.0000016 L_{☉}
Temperature	2130 K

Other designations
- GJ 3849, LHS 2924, LP 271-25, LSPM J1428+3310, NLTT 37480, TIC 286963145, 2MASS J14284323+3310391, WISEA J142842.93+331031.7, SDSS J142843.13+331036.8, FS 134

Database references
SIMBAD	data

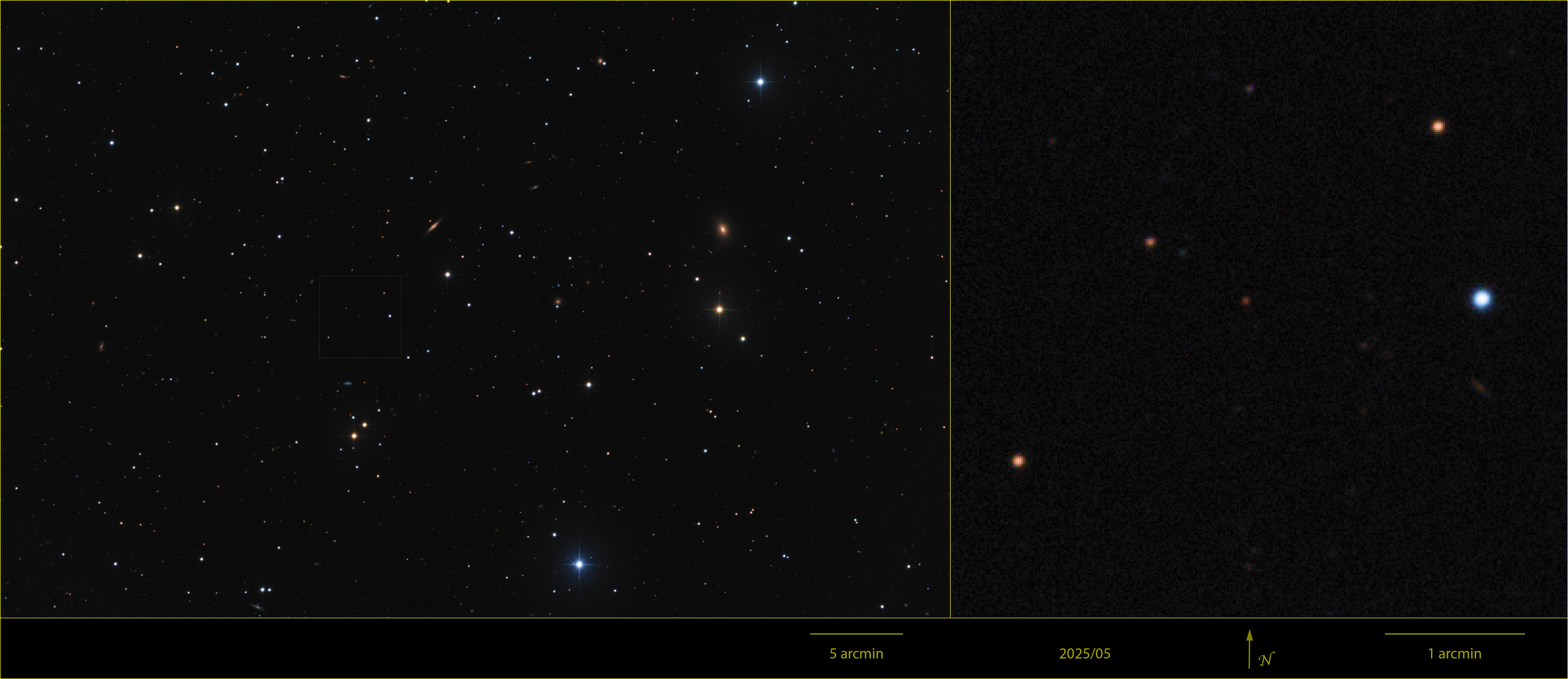
Section of the night sky showing LHS 2924 as a tiny red dot in the middle of the yellow square

LHS 2924, also commonly known as LP 271-25, is an extremely small and dim ultra-cool red dwarf located in the constellation of Boötes, about 35.78 light-years (10.97 parsecs) from the Sun. It is very challenging to see LHS 2924 from Earth, because it is extremely faint, having an apparent magnitude in the visible spectrum of only +19.35. Due to its faintness, it was only discovered in 1983, and it was the least massive star known at the time of its discovery, being smaller and less luminous than VB 10, which was before LHS 2924’s discovery the least massive and luminous star known. LHS 2924 is the primary standard for the M9V spectral class.

== See also ==
- 2MASS J0523-1403
- EBLM J0555-57
