= 171 G. Puppis =

Star in the constellation Puppis

Observation data Epoch J2000.0 Equinox ICRS
- Constellation: Puppis
- A
- Right ascension: 07^{h} 45^{m} 35.02168^{s}
- Declination: −34° 10′ 20.5143″
- Apparent magnitude (V): 5.38
- B
- Right ascension: 07^{h} 45^{m} 38.42749^{s}
- Declination: −33° 55′ 51.3414″
- Apparent magnitude (V): 16.7

Characteristics

A
- Evolutionary stage: Subgiant
- Spectral type: F9 V
- U−B color index: −0.085
- B−V color index: +0.56

Astrometry

A
Radial velocity (R_{v})	+102.6 km/s
Proper motion (μ)	RA: −221.54 mas/yr Dec.: +1,722.11 mas/yr
Parallax (π)	65.75±0.51 mas
Distance	49.6 ± 0.4 ly (15.2 ± 0.1 pc)
Absolute magnitude (M_{V})	+4.57

Orbit
Primary	Aa
Name	Ab
Period (P)	8,406+29 −7 days
Semi-major axis (a)	9.15+0.31 −0.33 AU
Eccentricity (e)	0.443+0.002 −0.001
Argument of periastron (ω) (secondary)	184.38+0.16 −0.17°
Semi-amplitude (K_{1}) (primary)	4.762±0.013 km/s

Details

Aa
Mass	0.85 M_{☉}
Radius	1.13+0.10 −0.09 R_{☉}
Luminosity	1.80+0.49 −0.28 L_{☉}
Surface gravity (log g)	4.34+0.07 −0.09 cgs
Temperature	5,858±70 K
Metallicity [Fe/H]	−0.78±0.06 dex
Rotational velocity (v sin i)	4.4 km/s

Ab
Mass	≥0.42±0.03 M_{☉}

B
Mass	0.507±0.007 M_{☉}
Radius	0.0135 (Note: Calculated, using the Stefan-Boltzmann law and the star's effective temperature and luminosity, with respect to the solar nominal effective temperature of 5,772 K: $$\sqrt{\left(\frac{5,772}{4,405}\right)^4 \times 10^{-4.2076}} = 0.0135\ R_\odot$$) R_{☉}
Luminosity	6.2×10^{−5} L_{☉}
Surface gravity (log g)	7.882±0.008 cgs
Temperature	4,405±15 K

Other designations
- GJ 288, HD 63077, HR 3018
- A: CD−33°4113, HIP 37853, HR 3018, SAO 198404
- B: VB 3, WD 0743-336

Database references
SIMBAD	A
- B
ARICNS	A
- B

171 G. Puppis (171 Pup) is a triple star system in the constellation of Puppis – the stern of Argo Navis – of apparent magnitude +5.38. Lacking a Bayer designation, it is instead known by its Gould designation. Based upon parallax measurements, the system is 49.6 light years away from the Solar System.

The inner pair form a spectroscopic binary with an orbital period of around 23 years. The orbit has a semi-major axis of 9.15 AU and a mild eccentricity of 0.443. The primary has a spectral class of F9V, matching a late F-type main-sequence star. However, stellar evolution models suggest it has left the main sequence and is now a subgiant. Little is known about the secondary, but its mass should be at least 0.42 M_{☉}.

There is a common proper motion companion, Van Biesbroeck 3 or WD 0743–340, at an angular separation of 869.65″ along a position angle of 2.81° from the inner pair. This is a white dwarf with a classification of DC11.0 and a temperature of 4,600 K, making it one of the coolest white dwarfs known.

171 G. Puppis is believed to be among the oldest star systems in the solar neighbourhood, being of the Population II. The primary's metal-to-hydrogen ratio is a logarithm of −0.78, translating to 16% of the Sun's abundance. In the early universe, the metallicity of the interstellar medium was much lower than that of the current universe.
