= HR 4458 =

Binary star system in the constellation Hydra

- Location of 20 Crateris (circled in red)

Observation data Epoch J2000 Equinox ICRS
- Constellation: Hydra
- A
- Right ascension: 11^{h} 34^{m} 29.48644^{s}
- Declination: −32° 49′ 52.8228″
- Apparent magnitude (V): 5.97
- B
- Right ascension: 11^{h} 34^{m} 30.47776^{s}
- Declination: −32° 50′ 02.4048″
- Apparent magnitude (V): 15

Characteristics

A
- Evolutionary stage: main sequence
- Spectral type: K0 V
- U−B color index: +0.325
- B−V color index: +0.80

B
- Evolutionary stage: white dwarf
- Spectral type: DC8

Astrometry

A
Radial velocity (R_{v})	−22.09±0.12 km/s
Proper motion (μ)	RA: −670.230 mas/yr Dec.: +822.399 mas/yr
Parallax (π)	104.6133±0.0277 mas
Distance	31.177 ± 0.008 ly (9.559 ± 0.003 pc)
Absolute magnitude (M_{V})	6.05

B
Proper motion (μ)	RA: –701.802 mas/yr Dec.: +828.928 mas/yr
Parallax (π)	104.6570±0.0267 mas
Distance	31.164 ± 0.008 ly (9.555 ± 0.002 pc)
Absolute magnitude (M_{V})	15

Orbit
Period (P)	1,400+600 −510 yr
Semi-major axis (a)	142+38 −37 au
Eccentricity (e)	0.28+0.57 −0.22
Inclination (i)	83.4+2.1 −7.1°

Details

HR 4458 A
Mass	0.900+0.044 −0.045 M_{☉}
Radius	0.84 R_{☉}
Luminosity (bolometric)	0.368 L_{☉}
Surface gravity (log g)	4.59 cgs
Temperature	5,241 K
Metallicity [Fe/H]	−0.37 dex
Rotational velocity (v sin i)	6.79 km/s
Age	4.6–5.8 Gyr

HR 4458 B
Mass	0.554±0.022 M_{☉}
Luminosity (bolometric)	0.000088 L_{☉}
Surface gravity (log g)	8.12 cgs
Temperature	5,000 K
Age	5.69 (Note: Cooling age) Gyr

Other designations
- 20 Crt, 289 G. Hya, CD−32°8179, GJ 432, HD 100623, HIP 56452, HR 4458, SAO 202583, LHS 308, LTT 4280, PLX 2678.00
- B: VB 4, WD 1132−325

Database references
SIMBAD	A
- B
ARICNS	data

HR 4458 (HD 100623) is a binary star system 31.18 light-years away in the equatorial constellation of Hydra. It has the Flamsteed designation 20 Crateris and the Gould designation 289 G. Hydrae; the former refers to the constellation Crater, since Flamsteed numbered the stars of Crater and the central portion of Hydra as a separate constellation from the other parts of Hydra. This object is visible to the naked eye as a dim, orange-hued star with an apparent visual magnitude of 5.97. It is moving closer to the Earth with a heliocentric radial velocity of −22 km/s.

The primary component is a K-type main-sequence star with a stellar classification of K0 V. It is around five billion years old with 90% of the Sun's mass and 84% of the Sun's radius. The star is radiating 37% of the Sun's luminosity from its photosphere at an effective temperature of 5,241 K. It has been examined for the presence of an infrared excess, but none was detected.

The secondary, designated VB 4, is a 15th-magnitude white dwarf of class DC8 sharing common proper motion with the primary. The orbital period of the pair is of 1,400 years, albeit with large uncertainty.
