= Blue dwarf (red-dwarf stage) =

Hypothetical class of star that develops from a red dwarf

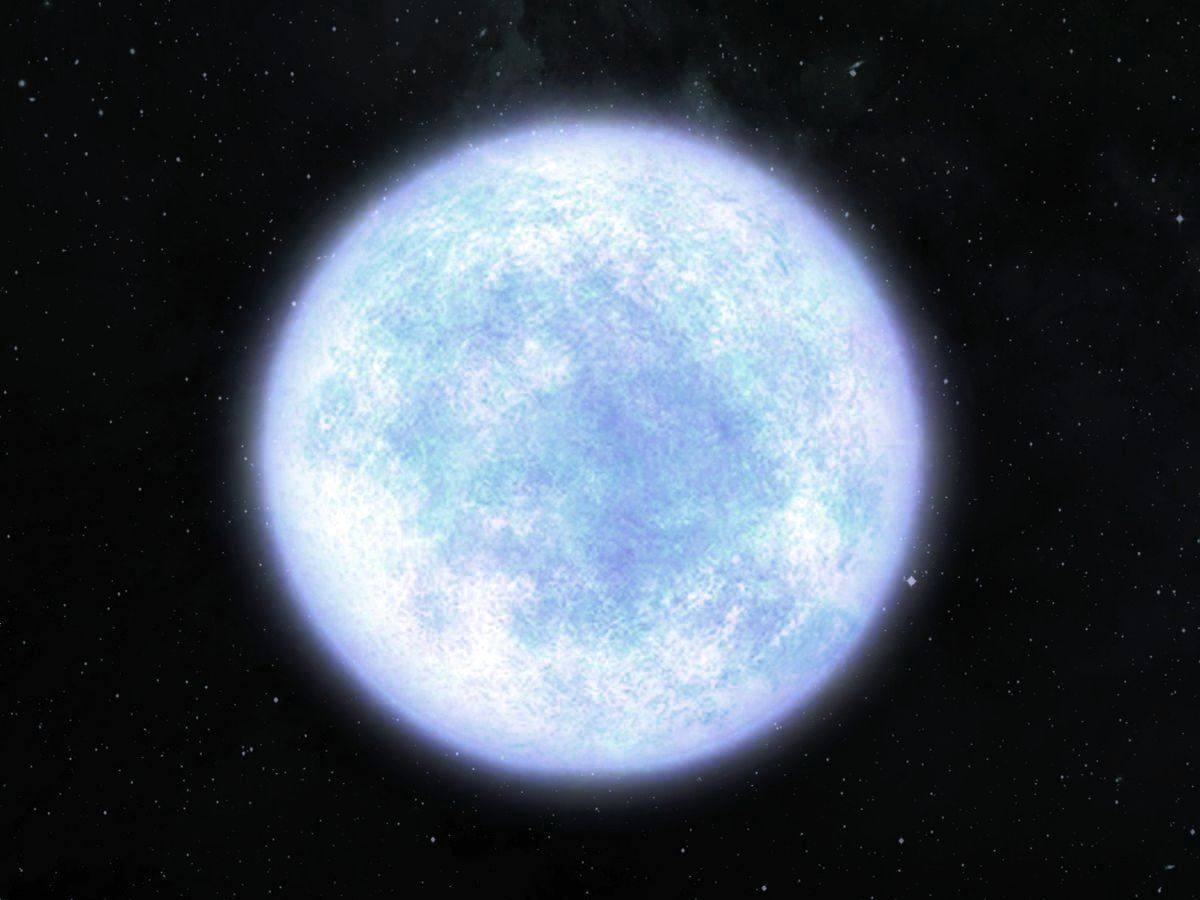
Artist's impression of a blue dwarf

A blue dwarf is a hypothetical class of star that develops from a red dwarf after it has exhausted much of its hydrogen fuel supply. Because red dwarfs fuse their hydrogen slowly and are fully convective (allowing their entire hydrogen supply to be fused, instead of merely that in the core), they are predicted to have lifespans of trillions of years; the universe is currently not old enough for any blue dwarfs to have formed yet. Their existence is predicted based on theoretical models.

== Hypothetical scenario ==
Stars increase in core power and pressure as they age, creating a power excess, which means they will find a way to get brighter. For stars more massive than red dwarfs, their opaque atmosphere means the star has to get larger to become more luminous. However, it is predicted that red dwarfs with less than 0.25 M_{☉} have clearer atmospheres. Thus they can increase luminosity simply by getting hotter, and as a result, more blue.

Despite their name, blue dwarfs would not necessarily increase in temperature enough to become blue stars. Simulations have been conducted on the evolution of red dwarfs with stellar mass between 0.06 M_{☉} and 0.25 M_{☉}. Of the masses simulated, the bluest of the blue dwarf stars at the end of the simulation had begun as a 0.14 M_{☉} red dwarf, and ended with surface temperature approximately 8,600 K (8,330 °C; 15,020 °F), making it a star of spectral type A.

== End of stellar life ==
Blue dwarfs are believed to eventually completely exhaust their store of hydrogen fuel, and their interior pressures are insufficient to fuse any other fuel. Once fusion ends, they are no longer main-sequence "dwarf" stars and become white dwarfs – which, despite the name, are not main-sequence stars and are not stars, but rather stellar remnants.

Once the former "blue" dwarf stars have become degenerate, non-stellar white dwarfs, they cool, losing the remnant heat left over from their final hydrogen-fusing stage. The cooling process also requires enormous periods of time – much longer than the age of the universe at present – similar to the immense time previously required for them to change from their original red dwarf stage to their final blue dwarf stage. The stellar remnant white dwarf will eventually cool to become a black dwarf. (The universe is not old enough for any stellar remnants to have cooled to "black", so black dwarfs are also a well-founded, but still hypothetical object.)

It is also theoretically possible for these dwarfs at any stage of their lives to merge and become larger stars, such as helium stars. Such stars should ultimately also become white dwarfs, which like the others, will cool down to black dwarfs.

== See also ==
- Lists of stars
- Wolf–Rayet star – Heterogeneous class of stars with unusual spectra
