= VB 10 =

Very small red dwarf star in the constellation Aquila

- An animation of images taken with the 200-inch (5.1 m) Hale Telescope over a period of nine years showing the proper motion of VB 10

Observation data Epoch J2000 Equinox ICRS
- Constellation: Aquila
- Right ascension: 19^{h} 16^{m} 57.61^{s}
- Declination: +05° 09′ 01.6″
- Apparent magnitude (V): 17.30

Characteristics
- Spectral type: M8.0V
- Apparent magnitude (B): ~19.42
- Apparent magnitude (R): ~15.6
- Apparent magnitude (J): 9.908 ±0.025
- Apparent magnitude (H): 9.226 ±0.026
- Apparent magnitude (K): 8.765 ±0.022
- Variable type: UV

Astrometry
Proper motion (μ)	RA: −599 mas/yr Dec.: −1,366 mas/yr
Parallax (π)	168.9537±0.0668 mas
Distance	19.304 ± 0.008 ly (5.919 ± 0.002 pc)
Absolute magnitude (M_{V})	18.7

Details
Mass	0.0881+0.0026 −0.0024 M_{☉}
Radius	0.1183+0.0059 −0.0057 R_{☉}
Luminosity (bolometric)	0.000499±0.000004 L_{☉}
Luminosity (visual, L_{V})	0.000003 L_{☉}
Surface gravity (log g)	5.5 cgs
Temperature	2,508+63 −60 K
Metallicity	~0
Rotation	23.6 days
Rotational velocity (v sin i)	6.5 km/s
Age	~1 Gyr

Other designations
- 2MASS J19165762+0509021, V1298 Aquilae, Gliese 752 B, Van Biesbroeck's Star

Database references
SIMBAD	data
Exoplanet Archive	data

VB 10 or Van Biesbroeck's star /vænˈbiːzbrʊk/ is a small and dim red dwarf located in the constellation Aquila. It is part of a binary star system. VB 10 is historically notable as it was the least luminous and least massive known star from its discovery in 1944, until 1982 when LHS 2924 was shown to be less luminous. Although it is relatively close to Earth, at about 19 light-years (5.8 parsecs), VB 10 is a dim magnitude 17, making it difficult to image with amateur telescopes as it can get lost in the glare of the primary star. VB 10 is also the primary standard for the M8V spectral class.

== History ==
VB 10 was discovered in 1944 by the astronomer George Van Biesbroeck using the 82-inch (2.1 m) Otto Struve reflector telescope at the McDonald Observatory. He found it while surveying the telescopic field of view of the high-proper-motion red dwarf Gliese 752 (Wolf 1055), for companions. Wolf 1055 had been catalogued 25 years earlier by German astronomer Max Wolf using similar astrophotographic techniques. It is designated VB 10 in the 1961 publication of Van Biesbroeck's star catalog. Later, other astronomers began referring to it as Van Biesbroeck's star in honor of its discoverer. Because it is so dim and so close to its much brighter primary star, earlier astronomical surveys missed it even though its large parallax and large proper motion should have made it stand out on photographic plates taken at different times.

== Characteristics ==
VB 10 has an extremely low luminosity with a baseline absolute magnitude of nearly 19 and an apparent magnitude of 17.3 (somewhat variable), making it very difficult to see; if it was placed at the center of our solar system instead of the Sun, it would shine on Earth's sky at a magnitude of −12.87—approximately the same magnitude as that of the full moon.

Later researchers also noted that its mass, at 0.08 solar mass (M_{☉}), is right at the lower limit needed to create internal pressures and temperatures high enough to initiate nuclear fusion and actually be a star rather than a brown dwarf. At the time of its discovery it was the lowest-mass star known. The previous record holder for the lowest mass was Wolf 359 at 0.09 M_{☉}.

VB 10 is also notable for its very large proper motion, moving more than one arcsecond a year through the sky as seen from Earth.

=== Flare star ===
VB 10 is a variable star and is identified in the General Catalogue of Variable Stars as V1298 Aquilae. It is a UV Ceti-type variable star and is known to be subject to frequent flare events. Its dynamics were studied from the Hubble Space Telescope in the mid-1990s. Although VB 10 has a normal low surface temperature of 2,600 K it was found to produce violent flares of up to 100,000 K. This came as a surprise to astronomers. It had previously been assumed that low mass red dwarfs would have insignificant or non-existent magnetic fields, which are necessary for the production of solar flares. The dwarfs were believed to lack the radiative zone just outside the star's core that powers the dynamo of stars like the Sun. Nevertheless, the detection of solar flares indicates some as yet unknown process allows the solely convective cores of low mass stars to produce sufficient magnetic fields to power such outbursts.

== Binary star ==
VB 10 is the secondary star of a bound binary star system. The primary is called Gliese 752, and hence VB 10 is also referred to as Gliese 752 B. The primary star is much larger and brighter. The two stars are separated by about 74 arcseconds (~434 AU).

== Claims of a planetary system ==
In May 2009, astronomers from NASA's Jet Propulsion Laboratory, Pasadena, California, announced that they had found evidence of a planet orbiting VB 10, which they designated VB 10b. The 200-inch (5.1 m) Hale Telescope at the Palomar Observatory was used to detect evidence of this planet using the astrometry method. The new planet was claimed to have a mass six times that of Jupiter and an orbital period of 270 days. However, subsequent studies using Doppler spectroscopy failed to detect the radial velocity variations that would be expected if such a planet was orbiting this small star. The claimants of VB 10b note that these Doppler measurements only rule out planets more massive than three times the mass of Jupiter, but this limit is only half the reported best-fit mass of the planet as originally claimed. The claims for this planet thus fall into a long history of claimed astrometric extrasolar planet detections that were subsequently refuted.

By 2016, it was suspected that an asymmetric debris disk signal was mistaken for the long-period planet.

== See also ==
- List of smallest known stars
- Stars named after people
