= HH 30 =

Protoplanetary disk in the Taurus molecular cloud

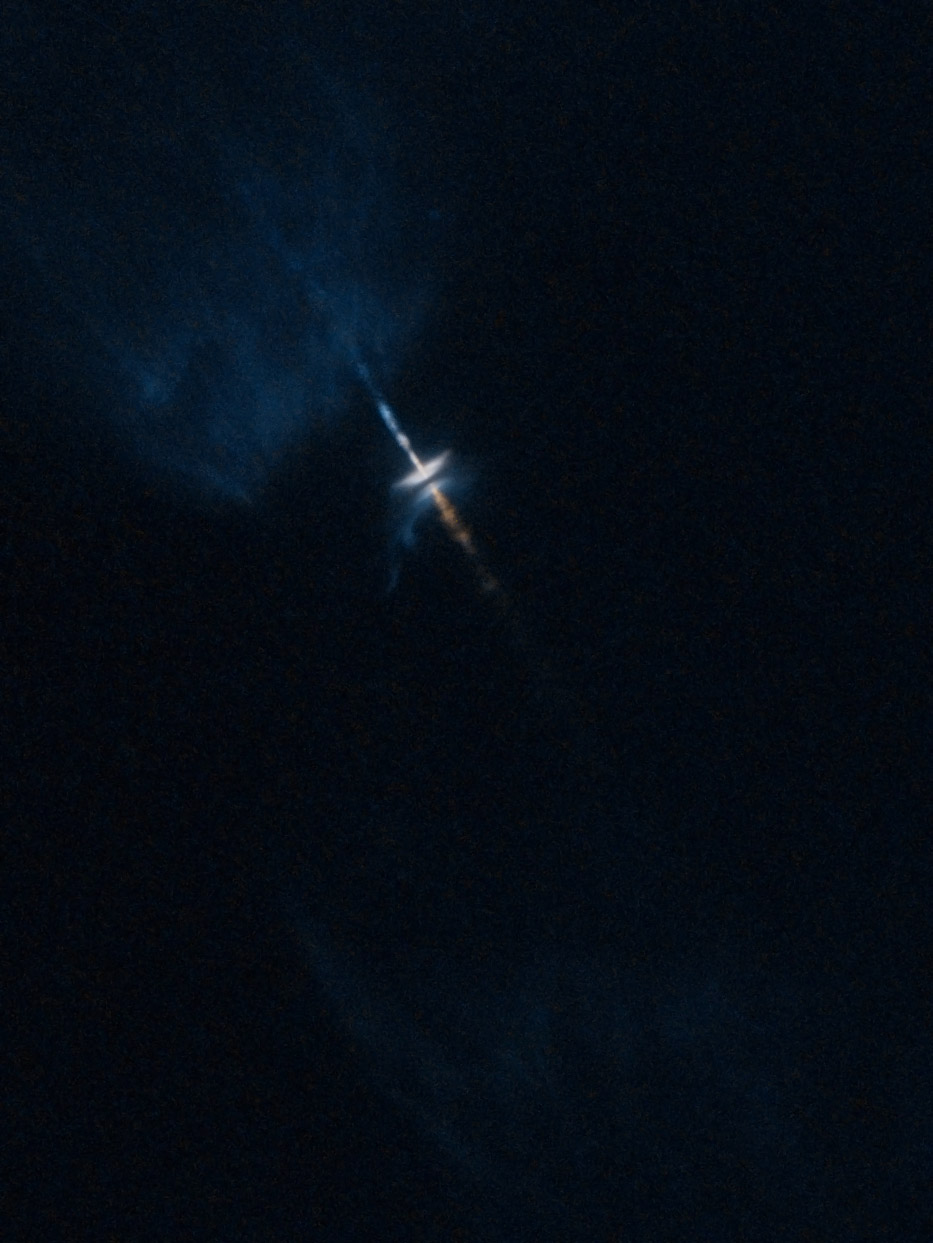
- HH 30 with Hubble ACS; Credit: ESA/Hubble and NASA Acknowledgement: Judy Schmidt

Observation data Epoch J2000 Equinox J2000
- Constellation: Taurus
- Right ascension: 04^{h} 31^{m} 37.51^{s}
- Declination: +18° 12′ 24.4″
- Apparent magnitude (V): 18.50±0.31

Characteristics
- Evolutionary stage: T Tauri star
- Spectral type: M0±2
- Variable type: variable nebula

Astrometry
Radial velocity (R_{v})	20.3±3.5 km/s
Distance	146.4±0.5 pc

Details
Mass	0.45±0.14 M_{☉}
Temperature	3,700 K
Rotational velocity (v sin i)	≤12 km/s
Age	approx. 1–2 Myr

Other designations
- 2MASS J04313747+1812244, JCMTSF J043137.4+181226, HH 30, HH 30 IRS, V1213 Tau, WISE J043137.48+181224.2, EPIC 210689083, TIC 353752582, Gaia DR3 3314311981834278912

Database references
SIMBAD	data

HH-30 (also V1213 Tauri) is an edge-on protoplanetary disk located about 146.4 parsecs from Earth that is surrounded by jets and a disk wind. HH-30 is located in the dark cloud LDN 1551 in the Taurus Molecular Cloud. The HH-30 disk is the prototype of an edge-on disk, due to its early discovery with Hubble. The object has been subject to many studies due to a wealth of dynamical processes that are happening to HH-30.

== Discovery ==
HH 30 was published by George Herbig in 1974 in the "Draft Catalog of Herbig–Haro Objects" and notes: "HH-30 (4h 28m 44s) is a small, almost stellar spot 2' south of XZ and HL Tau. There is a fainter nebulosity immediately northeast. The small fuzzy spot of very similar appearance at 35" in 250° from HL Tau is not a HH Object, but a star having Hα in emission." In 1996 it became clear that the object is an edge-on protoplanetary disk with jets.

== The central star ==
The star is hidden behind the dust of the disk. The spectral type was measured around M0 with the Keck Observatory, corresponding to a temperature of around 3700 Kelvin. Disk rotation constrained the star mass to 0.45 M_{☉}. One study suggest that the central object is a binary star, due to the jet wiggling. A follow-up study found that the jet-producing primary has a mass of 0.31 ±0.04 M_{☉} and that the secondary has a mass of 0.14 ±0.03 M_{☉}. Both objects should be separated by 18.0 ±0.6 astronomical units (AU).

== Protoplanetary disk ==
Observations with Hubble WFPC2 in 1996 discovered the disk, which has a radius of 250 AU. The disk is seen as a bi-reflection nebula and the disk blocks the light of the star. The northern part of the reflection nebula decreased in brightness by 0.5 mag between two observations, while the southern part increased in brightness by 0.5 mag. The disk around the star is a class II disk, meaning it contains both gas and dust particles. Observations with the Plateau de Bure interferometer detected the carbon monoxide (CO) emission and measured the rotation of the disk. Observations with the Atacama Large Millimeter Array (ALMA) showed the mid-plane of the disk in ^{13}CO and also measured its rotation. A study with JWST and archived Hubble and ALMA data was published in 2024. This showed inefficient dust settling in the disk. Dust settling means that larger dust grains settle to the mid-plane of the disk. The observation also showed that the disk contains spiral-like and tail-like structure. The disk has a very high inclination of at least 84°.

=== Jets ===
The jets were discovered in 1983 from CCD images at Calar Alto Observatory. A proper motion survey in 1990 showed a speed of around 170 km/s of the jets. This study also detected H-alpha, ionized nitrogen and sulfur in the jet. Early observations with Hubble showed that the knots of the jet have a speed of 100 to 300 km/s. JWST NIRCam and MIRI observations showed the previously observed jet and a bi-conical outflow. The jet is bright in the MIRI F1280W filter, likely tracing ionized neon emission. One knot was seen moving with around 121 km/s. The jet is seen with NIRSpec in ionized iron with a tight semi-opening angle of 1.4°±0.9°.

=== Disk wind ===
A CO outflow was first resolved in 2006, and in 2024 the outflow was detected with ALMA in ^{12}CO. The researchers found three distinct shells in the outflow and measured an outflow mass of (1.83 ±0.19)×10^{‑4} M_{☉}. This outflow is expanding with a speed of around 4–6 km/s and possibly rotates with a speed of ≤0.5 km/s. These shells can be explained by a magnetocentrifugal disk winds (MHD wind). Another study using NIRSpec and ALMA, found that the outflow is nestled within each other. The jet is seen with a tight semi-opening angle of around 1.4°. The disk wind is seen with a wider semi-opening angle, with the molecular hydrogen (H_{2}) emission having a semi-opening angle of around 14°. But this emission is also nestled within cold carbon monoxide (CO) emission from ALMA.

== See also ==
- List of resolved circumstellar disks

Examples of other edge-on disks:

- Beta Pictoris (debris disks)
- AU Microscopii (debris disks)
- HD 106906 (debris disk)
- Dracula's Chivito (protoplanetary)
- Gomez's Hamburger (protoplanetary)
- HK Tauri B (protoplanetary)
- 2MASS J04202144+2813491 (protoplanetary)

== Gallery ==
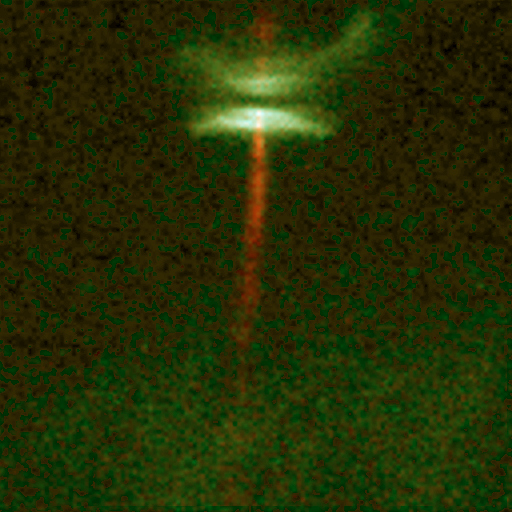
Hubble WFPC2 image of HH 30 in 1995

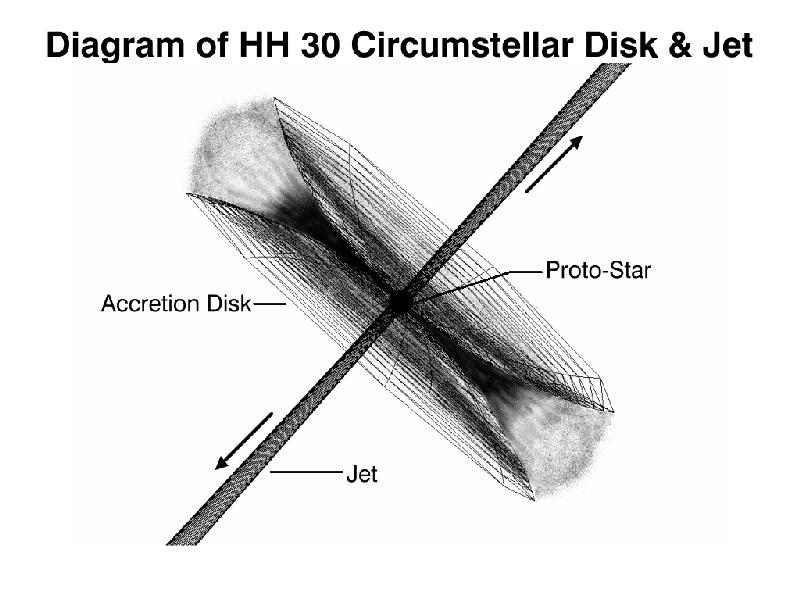
An early interpretation of the images of HH 30 in 1995

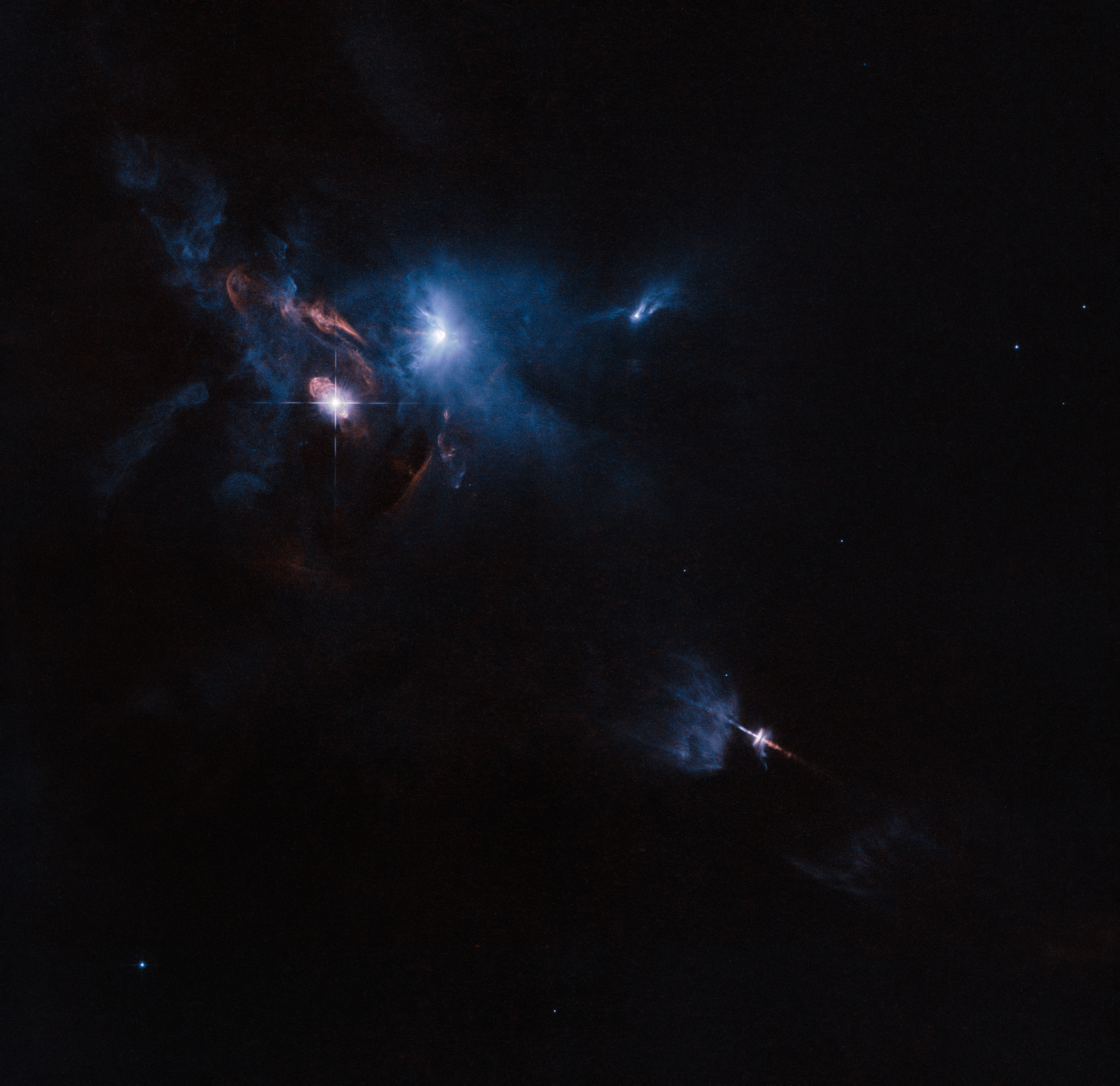
HH 30 (lower right) and XZ and HL Tauri on the upper left. Hubble ACS image.

Images of HH 30 by Webb, Hubble, and ALMA

HH 30 by Webb
