= HD 219617 =

Binary star system in the constellation Aquarius

Observation data Epoch J2000 Equinox J2000
- Constellation: Aquarius
- Right ascension: 23^{h} 17^{m} 05.0438^{s}
- Declination: −13° 51′ 03.597″
- Apparent magnitude (V): 8.14

Characteristics

HD 219617A
- Spectral type: sdF5

HD 219617B
- Spectral type: sdF6

Astrometry
Radial velocity (R_{v})	13.28±0.35 km/s
Parallax (π)	15.08±1.8 mas
Distance	approx. 220 ly (approx. 66 pc)
Absolute magnitude (M_{V})	+4.89

Orbit
Primary	HD 219617A
Name	HD 219617B
Period (P)	388^{+34}_{−24} y
Semi-major axis (a)	0.957^{+0.053}_{−0.041}″
Eccentricity (e)	0.464^{+0.040}_{−0.041}
Inclination (i)	86.93^{+0.07}_{−0.06}°

Details

HD 219617A
Mass	1.126^{+0.004}_{−0.005} M_{☉}
Surface gravity (log g)	4.30 cgs
Temperature	5825 K
Metallicity [Fe/H]	−1.45 dex
Rotational velocity (v sin i)	6.2 km/s
Age	16.14^{+0.81}_{−0.78} Gyr

HD 219617B
Mass	1.068±0.004 M_{☉}
Surface gravity (log g)	4.30 cgs

Other designations
- BD−14 6437, HIP 114962, ADS 16644, 2MASS J23170501-1351046, Gaia EDR3 2411728178376670976
- HD 219617A: TYC 5827-1181-2
- HD 219617B: TYC 5827-1181-1

Database references
SIMBAD	data
- A
- B

HD 219617 is a binary star system some 220 light-years away from the Solar System in the constellation Aquarius. It is composed of two metal-poor F-type subdwarf stars orbiting each other in a 388-year orbit. Unlike many halo stars, which exhibit an excess of alpha elements relative to iron, HD 219617 is depleted in iron peak and alpha elements, although alpha elements concentrations are poorly constrained. The stellar chemical composition is peculiar, being relatively oxygen-enriched and extremely depleted in neutron capture elements. The helium fraction of the binary star at present cannot be reliably determined, and appears to be near the primordial helium abundance.

The binary star HD 219617 is part of the hierarchical triple system LDS 6393, together with the red subdwarf VB 12 (LHS 541) of spectral class sdM3 at a projected separation of 19″ (1,200 AU). VB 12 also has several peculiarities. The star system belongs kinematically to the halo stars. Additional stellar components of the star system are suspected.

The binary nature of HD 219617 has been known since the 19th century, but uncertainties in measurement and a stellar conjunction in 1920 precluded determining even an approximate orbit until 1991. Then in 2017, the orbit was measured accurately, as separation between the stars increased.
