= Stellar flyby =

Astronomy phenomenon

Stellar flyby refers to the close passage of two or more stars, which remain unbound after their passage.

== Close encounters with the Sun ==
The Sun resides in a region of relatively low stellar density in the Milky Way. Thus, close stellar flybys are relatively rare. However, once in a while a star can come relatively close. One example is Scholz's star (WISE designation WISE 0720−0846 or fully WISE J072003.20−084651.2), which is a dim binary stellar system 22 light-years (6.8 parsecs) from the Sun in the constellation Monoceros near the galactic plane. The system passed through the Solar System's Oort cloud roughly 70,000 years ago. Gliese 710 or HIP 89825, an orange 0.6 M_{☉} star in the constellation Serpens Cauda, is projected to pass near the Sun in about 1.29 million years at a predicted minimum distance of 0.051 parsecs—0.1663 light-years (10,520 astronomical units) (about 1.60 trillion km) – about 1/25th of the current distance to Proxima Centauri.

== Close flybys in different environments ==
Close flybys are usually relatively rare among field stars, but are more common in star clusters In these groups of stars the stellar density is much higher, so that close passages between stars are more common. In particular in young star clusters, open clusters and globular clusters stellar flybys are thought to be common. In young clusters, such close stellar flybys might influence the frequency and size of protoplanetary discs, and influence the planet formation process in these environments.
