= Star cluster =

Group of stars

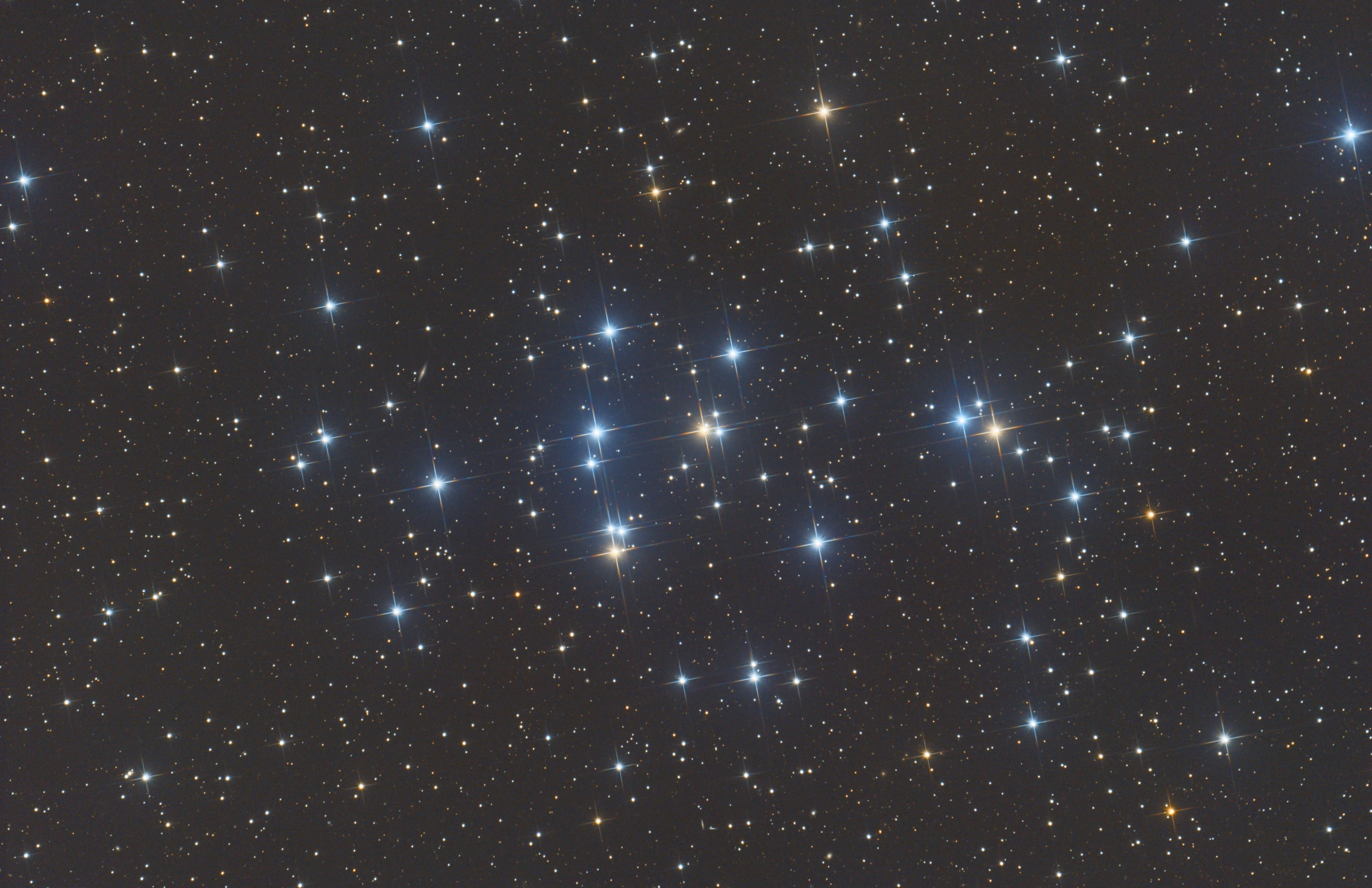
Messier 44, a cluster in the constellation of Cancer

A star cluster is a group of stars, that share an origin, formed at roughly the same time and held together by self-gravitation. Two main types of star clusters can be distinguished: globular clusters, tight groups of ten thousand to millions of old stars which are gravitationally bound; and open clusters, less tight groups of stars, generally containing fewer than a few hundred members. If a star cluster is obscured in visible light due to extinction, but visible in infrared light, it is classified as an infrared cluster.

As they move through their galaxy, over time, open clusters become disrupted by the gravitational influence of giant molecular clouds, so that the clusters observed are often young. Even though no longer gravitationally bound, they will continue to move in broadly the same direction through space and are then known as stellar associations, sometimes referred to as moving groups. Globular clusters, with more members and more mass, remain intact for far longer and the globular clusters observed are usually billions of years old.

Star clusters within the Milky Way that are visible to the naked eye, include the Pleiades and Hyades open clusters, and the globular cluster 47 Tucanae.

== Open cluster ==
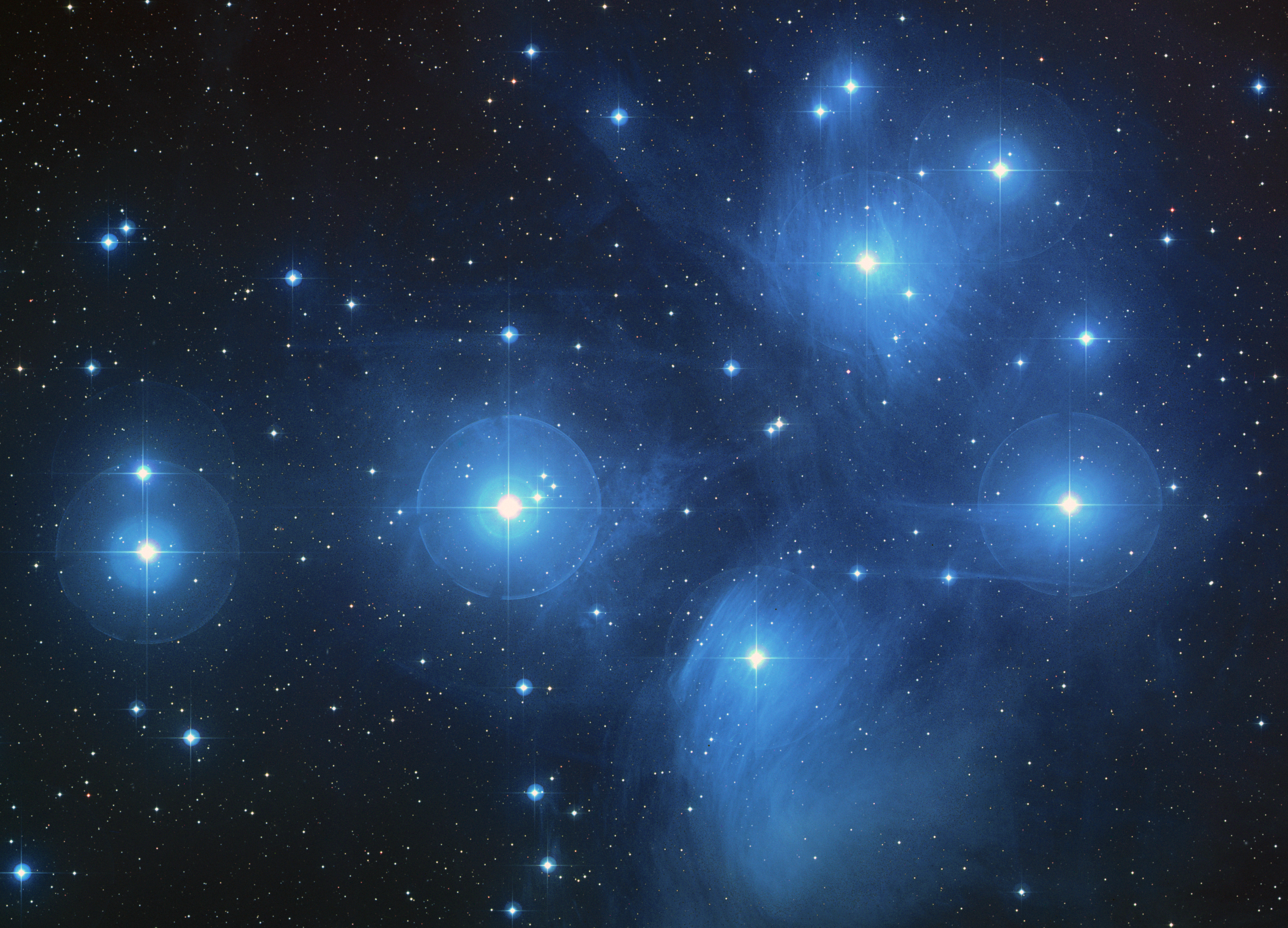
The Pleiades, an open cluster dominated by hot blue stars surrounded by reflection nebulosity

Open clusters are confined to the galactic plane, and are almost always found within spiral arms. They are generally young objects, up to a few tens of millions of years old, with a few rare exceptions as old as a few billion years, such as Messier 67 (the closest and most observed old open cluster) for example. They form in H II regions such as the Orion Nebula.

Open clusters typically have a few hundred members and are located in an area up to 30 light-years across. Being much less densely populated than globular clusters, they are much less tightly gravitationally bound, and over time, are disrupted by the gravity of giant molecular clouds and other clusters. Close encounters between cluster members can also result in the ejection of stars, a process known as "evaporation".

The most prominent open clusters are the Pleiades and Hyades in Taurus. The Double Cluster of h+Chi Persei can also be prominent under dark skies. Open clusters are often dominated by hot young blue stars, because although such stars are short-lived in stellar terms, only lasting a few tens of millions of years, open clusters tend to have dispersed before these stars die.

A subset of open clusters constitute a binary or aggregate cluster. New research indicates Messier 25 may constitute a ternary star cluster together with NGC 6716 and Collinder 394.

Establishing precise distances to open clusters enables the calibration of the period-luminosity relationship shown by Cepheids variable stars, which are then used as standard candles. Cepheids are luminous and can be used to establish both the distances to remote galaxies and the expansion rate of the Universe (Hubble constant). Indeed, the open cluster NGC 7790 hosts three classical Cepheids which are critical for such efforts.

=== Embedded cluster ===
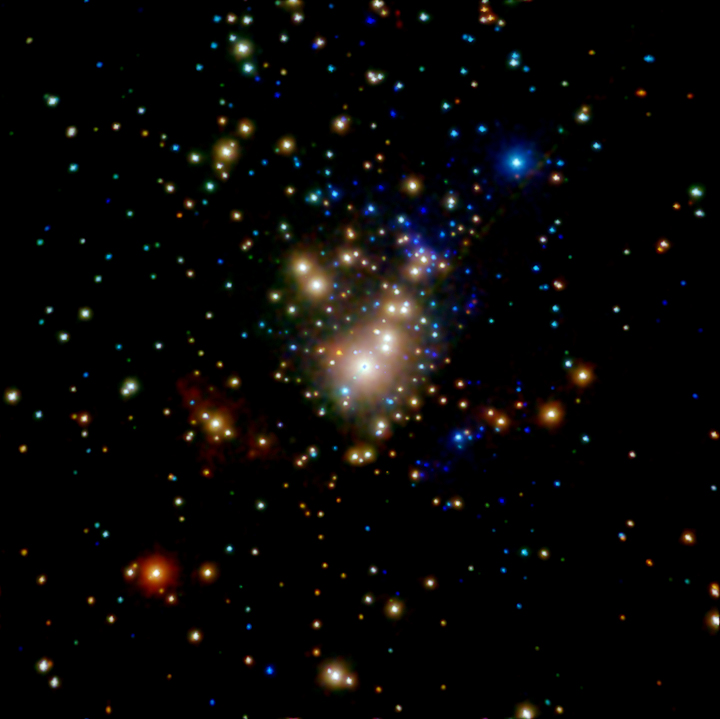
The embedded Trapezium cluster seen in X-rays which penetrate the surrounding clouds

Embedded clusters are groups of very young stars that are partially or fully encased in interstellar dust or gas which is often impervious to optical observations. Embedded clusters form in molecular clouds, when the clouds begin to collapse and form stars. There is often ongoing star formation in these clusters, so embedded clusters may be home to various types of young stellar objects including protostars and pre-main-sequence stars. An example of an embedded cluster is the Trapezium Cluster in the Orion Nebula. In ρ Ophiuchi cloud (L1688) core region there is an embedded cluster.

The embedded cluster phase may last for several million years, after which gas in the cloud is depleted by star formation or dispersed through radiation pressure, stellar winds and outflows, or supernova explosions. In general less than 30% of cloud mass is converted to stars before the cloud is dispersed, but this fraction may be higher in particularly dense parts of the cloud. With the loss of mass in the cloud, the energy of the system is altered, often leading to the disruption of a star cluster. Most young embedded clusters disperse shortly after the end of star formation.

The open clusters found in the Galaxy are former embedded clusters that were able to survive early cluster evolution. However, nearly all freely floating stars, including the Sun, were originally born into embedded clusters that disintegrated.

== Globular cluster ==
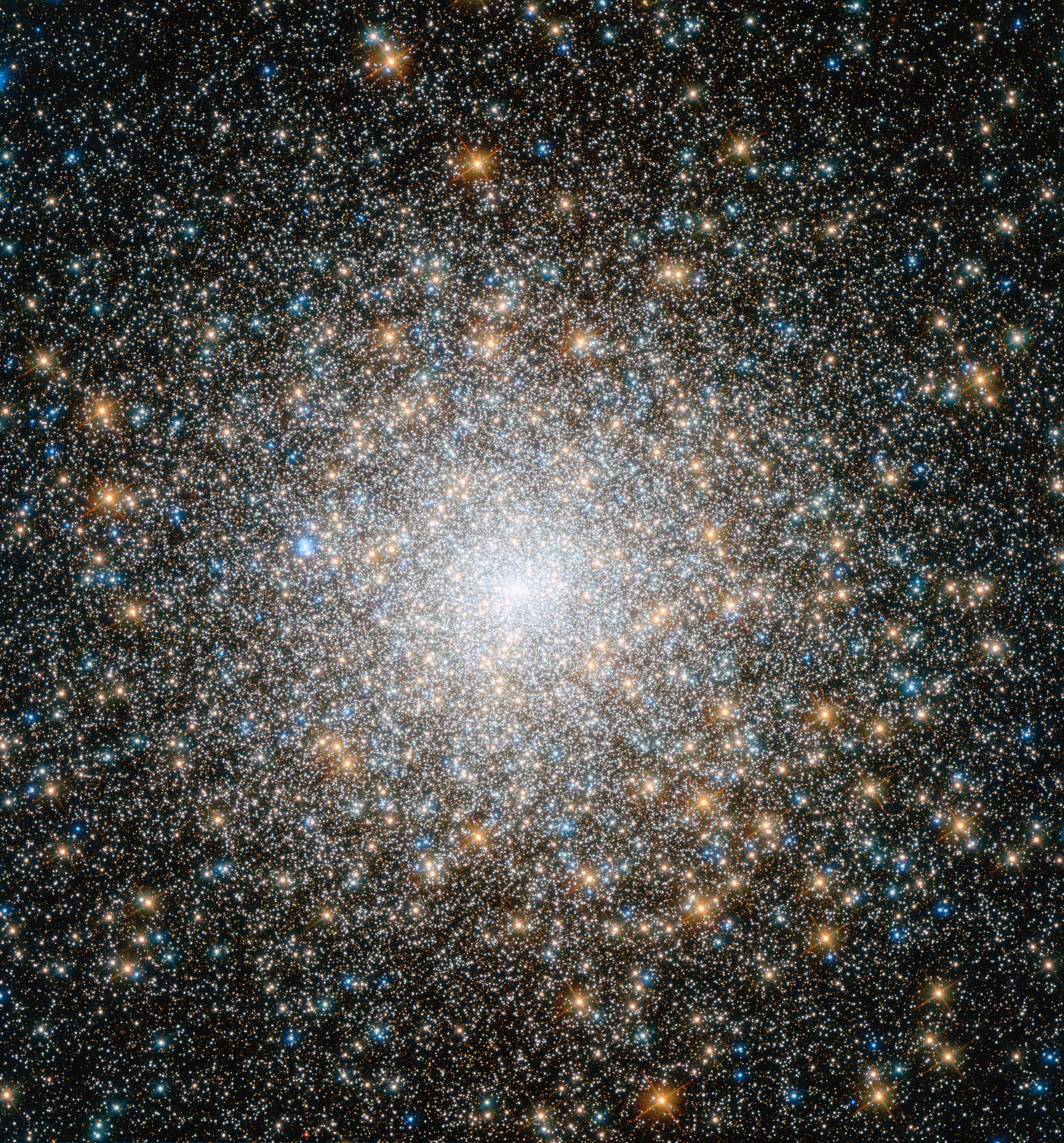
The globular cluster Messier 15 photographed by HST

Globular clusters are roughly spherical groupings ranging from 10 thousand to several million stars packed into regions ranging from 10 to 30 light-years across. They commonly consist of very old Population II stars – just a few hundred million years younger than the universe itself – which are mostly yellow and red, with masses less than two solar masses. Such stars predominate within clusters because hotter and more massive stars have exploded as supernovae, or evolved through planetary nebula phases to end as white dwarfs. Yet a few rare blue stars exist in globulars, thought to be formed by stellar mergers in their dense inner regions; these stars are known as blue stragglers.

In the Milky Way galaxy, globular clusters are distributed roughly spherically in the galactic halo, around the Galactic Center, orbiting the center in highly elliptical orbits. In 1917, the astronomer Harlow Shapley made the first respectable estimate of the Sun's distance from the Galactic Center, based on the distribution of globular clusters.

Until the mid-1990s, globular clusters were the cause of a great mystery in astronomy, as theories of stellar evolution gave ages for the oldest members of globular clusters that were greater than the estimated age of the universe. However, greatly improved distance measurements to globular clusters using the Hipparcos satellite and increasingly accurate measurements of the Hubble constant resolved the paradox, giving an age for the universe of about 13 billion years and an age for the oldest stars of a few hundred million years less.

Our Galaxy has about 150 globular clusters, some of which may have been captured cores of small galaxies stripped of stars previously in their outer margins by the tides of the Milky Way, as seems to be the case for the globular cluster M79. Some galaxies are much richer in globulars than the Milky Way: The giant elliptical galaxy M87 contains over a thousand.

A few of the brightest globular clusters are visible to the naked eye; the brightest, Omega Centauri, was observed in antiquity and catalogued as a star, before the telescopic age. The brightest globular cluster in the northern hemisphere is M13 in the constellation of Hercules.

== Super star cluster ==
Super star clusters are very large regions of recent star formation, and are thought to be the precursors of globular clusters. Examples include Westerlund 1 in the Milky Way.

== Intermediate forms ==
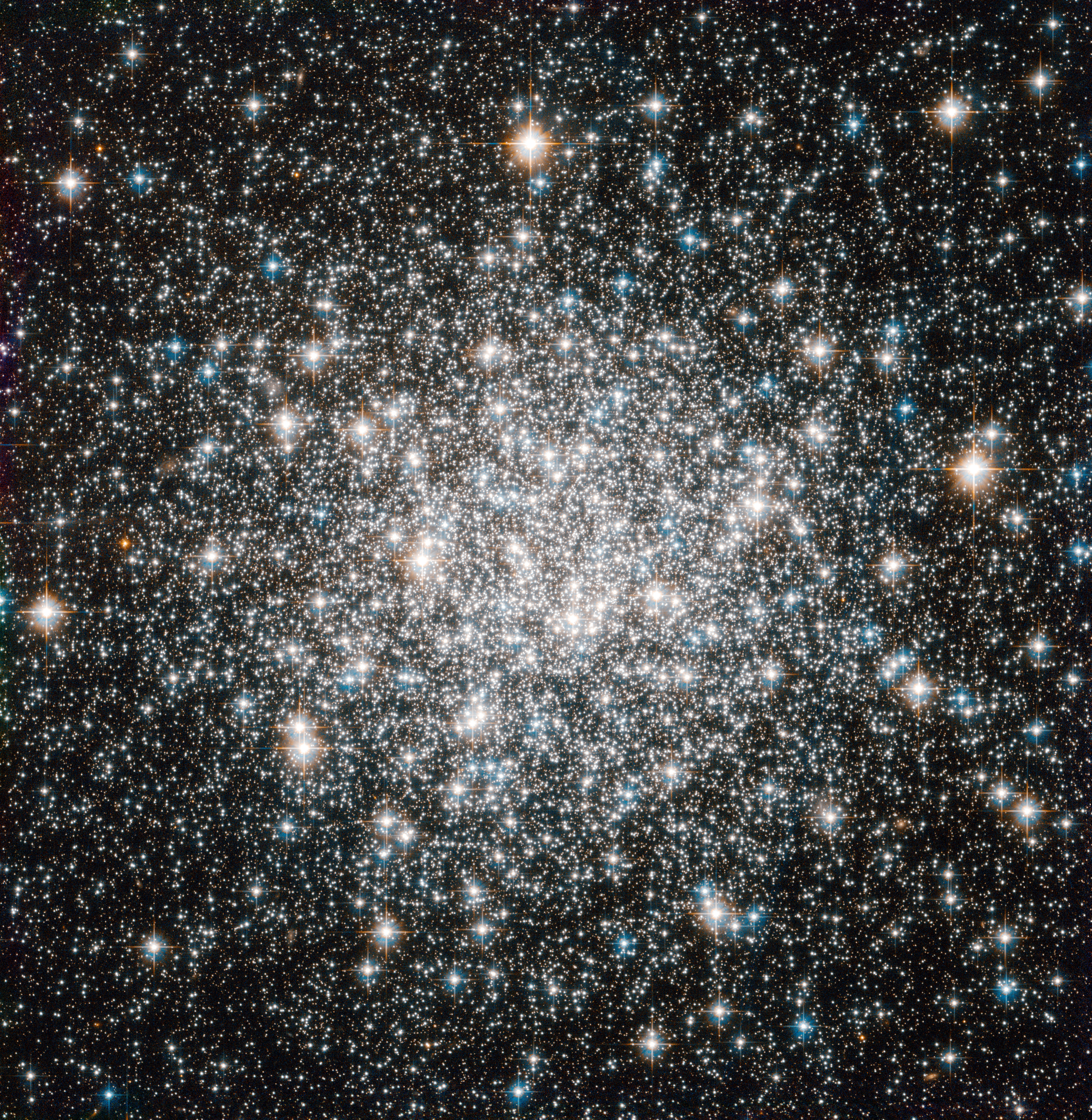
Messier 68, a loose globular cluster whose constituent stars span a volume of space more than a hundred light-years across

In 2005, astronomers discovered a new type of star cluster in the Andromeda Galaxy, which is, in several ways, very similar to globular clusters although less dense. No such clusters (which also known as extended globular clusters) are known in the Milky Way. The three discovered in Andromeda Galaxy are M31WFS C1 M31WFS C2, and M31WFS C3.

These new-found star clusters contain hundreds of thousands of stars, a similar number to globular clusters. The clusters also share other characteristics with globular clusters, e.g. the stellar populations and metallicity. What distinguishes them from the globular clusters is that they are much larger – several hundred light-years across – and hundreds of times less dense. The distances between the stars are thus much greater. The clusters have properties intermediate between globular clusters and dwarf spheroidal galaxies.

How these clusters are formed is not yet known, but their formation might well be related to that of globular clusters. Why M31 has such clusters, while the Milky Way has not, is not yet known. It is also unknown if any other galaxy contains this kind of clusters, but it would be very unlikely that M31 is the sole galaxy with extended clusters.

Another type of cluster are faint fuzzies which so far have only been found in lenticular galaxies like NGC 1023 and NGC 3384. They are characterized by their large size compared to globular clusters and a ringlike distribution around the centres of their host galaxies. As the latter they seem to be old objects.

== Astronomical significance ==
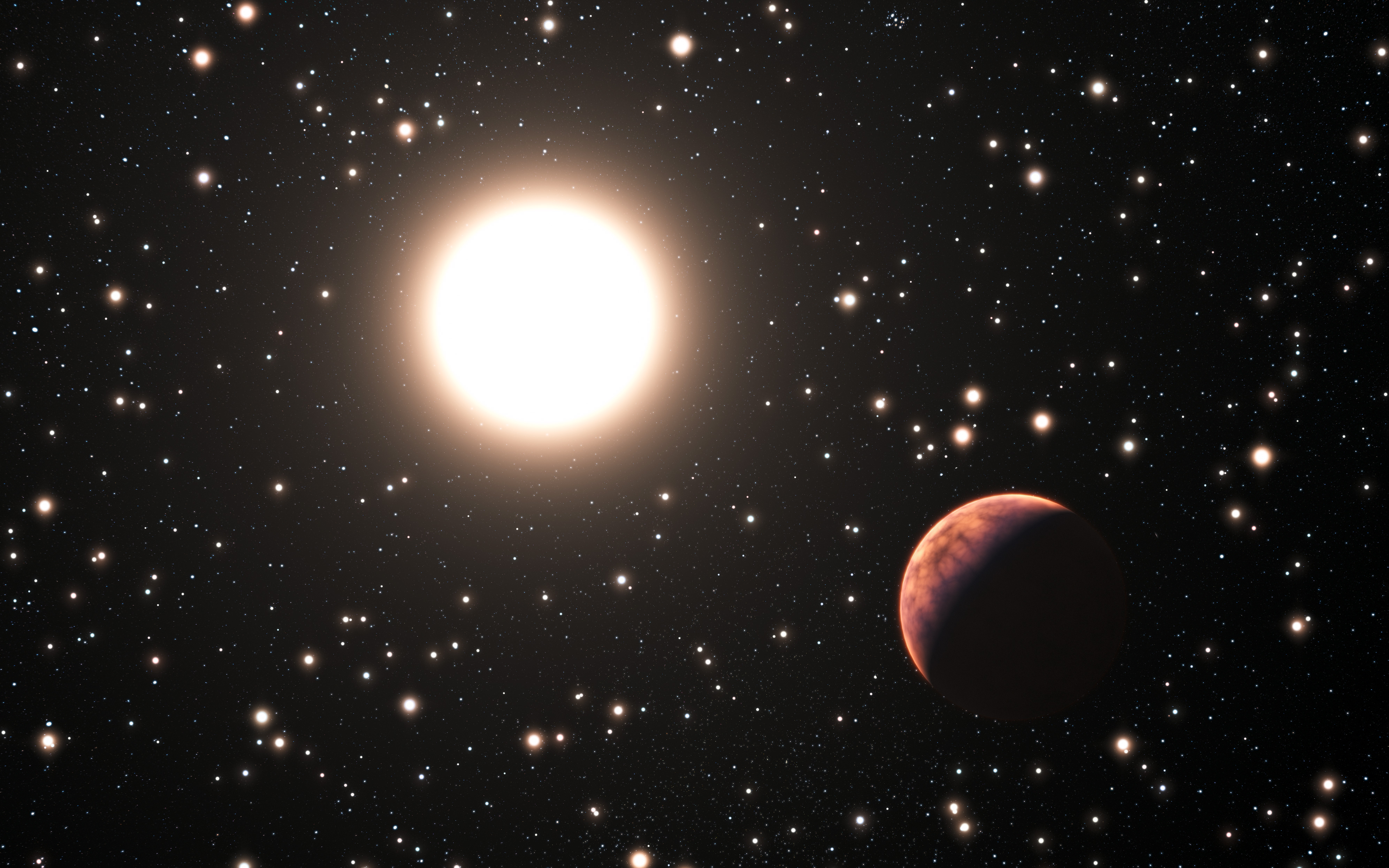
Artist's impression of an exoplanet orbiting a star in the cluster Messier 67

Star clusters are important in many areas of astronomy. The reason behind this is that almost all the stars in old clusters were born at roughly the same time. Various properties of all the stars in a cluster are a function only of mass, and so stellar evolution theories rely on observations of open and globular clusters. This is primarily true for old globular clusters. In the case of young (age < 1Gyr) and intermediate-age (1 < age < 5 Gyr), factors such as age, mass, chemical compositions may also play vital roles. Based on their ages, star clusters can reveal a lot of information about their host galaxies. For example, star clusters residing in the Magellanic Clouds can provide essential information about the formation of the Magellanic Clouds dwarf galaxies. This, in turn, can help us understand many astrophysical processes happening in our own Milky Way Galaxy. These clusters, especially the young ones can explain the star formation process that might have happened in our Milky Way Galaxy.

Clusters are also a crucial step in determining the distance scale of the universe. A few of the nearest clusters are close enough for their distances to be measured using parallax. A Hertzsprung–Russell diagram can be plotted for these clusters which has absolute values known on the luminosity axis. Then, when similar diagram is plotted for a cluster whose distance is not known, the position of the main sequence can be compared to that of the first cluster and the distance estimated. This process is known as main-sequence fitting. Reddening and stellar populations must be accounted for when using this method.

Nearly all stars in the Galactic field, including the Sun, were initially born in regions with embedded clusters that disintegrated. This means that properties of stars and planetary systems may have been affected by early clustered environments. This appears to be the case for our own Solar System, in which chemical abundances point to the effects of a supernova from a nearby star early in our Solar System's history.

== Star cloud ==
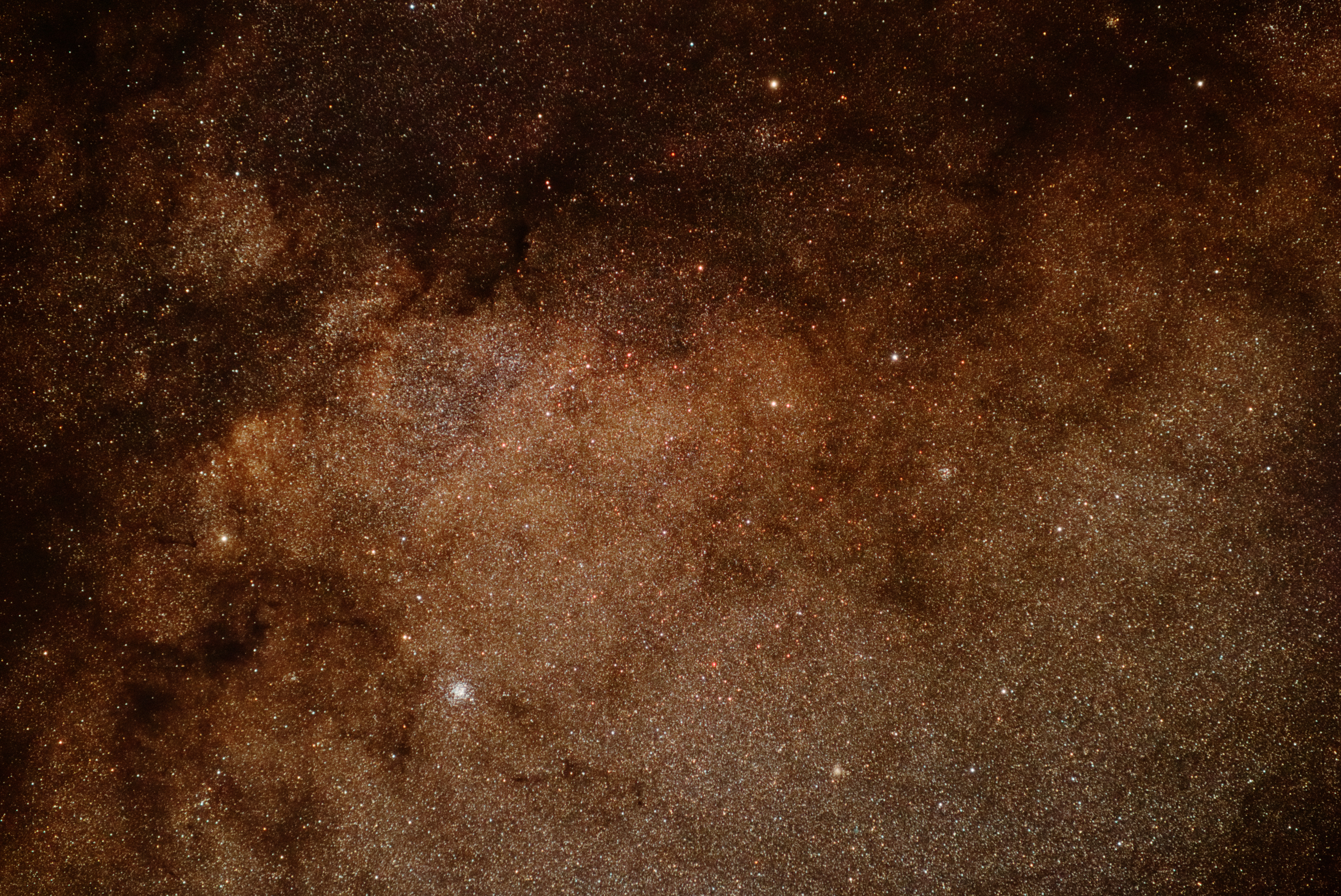
Scutum Star Cloud with open cluster Messier 11 at lower left

Technically not star clusters, star clouds are large groups of many stars within a galaxy, spread over very many light-years of space. Often they contain star clusters within them. The stars appear closely packed, but are not usually part of any structure. Within the Milky Way, star clouds show through gaps between dust clouds of the Great Rift, allowing deeper views along our particular line of sight. Star clouds have also been identified in other nearby galaxies. Examples of star clouds include the Large Sagittarius Star Cloud, Small Sagittarius Star Cloud, Scutum Star Cloud, Cygnus Star Cloud, Norma Star Cloud, and NGC 206 in the Andromeda Galaxy.

== Nomenclature ==
In 1979, the International Astronomical Union's 17th general assembly recommended that newly discovered star clusters, open or globular, within the Galaxy have designations following the convention "Chhmm±ddd", always beginning with the prefix C, where h, m, and d represent the approximate coordinates of the cluster centre in hours and minutes of right ascension, and degrees of declination, respectively, with leading zeros. The designation, once assigned, is not to change, even if subsequent measurements improve on the location of the cluster centre. The first of such designations were assigned by Gosta Lynga in 1982.

== See also ==
- Hypercompact stellar system
- Robust associations of massive baryonic objects (RAMBOs)
- Stellar flyby
