= List of star systems within 50–55 light-years =

This is a list of star systems within 50–55 light years of Earth.

== List ==
Key
#	Visible to the unaided eye
$	Bright star (absolute magnitude of +8.5 or brighter)
‡	White dwarf
§	Brown dwarf or sub-brown dwarf
*	Nearest in constellation

System	Star or (sub-) brown dwarf	Distance (ly)	Constellation	Coordinates: RA, Dec (Ep J2000, Eq J2000)	Stellar class	Apparent magnitude (V)	Parallax (mas)	Notes and additional references
Delta Aquilae	A$ (Guqi)	50.1 ± 0.6	Aquila	19^{h} 25^{m} 29.90139^{s} +03° 06′ 53.2061″	F0IV	3.365#	.00613	
Delta Aquilae	B	50.1 ± 0.6	Aquila	19^{h} 25^{m} 29.90139^{s} +03° 06′ 53.2061″	K		.00613	
51 Pegasi (Helvetios)		50.1 ± 0.6	Pegasus	22^{h} 57^{m} 27.9805^{s} +20° 46′ 07.797″	G5V	5.49	.00612	Has 1 Confirmed exoplanet (51 Pegasi b/Dimidium). It was the first exoplanet to be discovered orbiting a main-sequence star, the Sun-like 51 Pegasi, and marked a breakthrough in astronomical research. It is the prototype for a class of planets called hot Jupiters.
HR 159	A	50.2 ± 0.8	Cetus	00^{h} 37^{m} 20.7196^{s} −24° 46′ 02.1843″	G8V	5.57	.00612	
HR 159	B	50.2 ± 0.8	Cetus	00^{h} 37^{m} 20.7196^{s} −24° 46′ 02.1843″	G8V		.00612	
WISE 0614+3912		50.2	Auriga	06^{h} 14^{m} 07.51^{s} +39° 12′ 35.67″	T8	16.93	.00611	
WISE 1617+1807		50.2	Hercules	16^{h} 17^{m} 05.74^{s} +18° 07′ 14.10″	T8		.00611	
WISE 1627+3255		50.2	Horologium	16^{h} 27^{m} 25.65^{s} +32° 55′ 24.60″	T6	16.27	.00611	
Gliese 156		50.3 ± 0.9	Eridanus	03^{h} 54^{m} 35.47^{s} −06° 49′ 33.65″	K7V	9.02	.00610	
Phi² Ceti		50.4 ± 0.8	Cetus	00^{h} 50^{m} 07.58896^{s} −10° 38′ 39.5839″	F7V	5.172	.00608	
Sigma Boötis (Hemelein Secunda/Genghe)		50.4 ± 0.6	Boötes	14^{h} 34^{m} 40.817^{s} +29° 44′ 42.48″	F2V	4.46	.00608	
Gliese 862		50.4 ± 0.8	Piscis Austrinus	22^{h} 29^{m} 15.20^{s} −30° 01′ 06.40″	K5V	8.62	.00608	
Gliese 227		50.4 ± 0.7	Orion	06^{h} 06^{m} 40.35^{s} +15.32 29.92°	KV	6.53	.00608	
99 Herculis	A	50.5 ± 0.6	Hercules	18^{h} 07^{m} 01.53971^{s} +30° 33′ 43.6896″	F7V	5.10	.00607	
99 Herculis	B	50.5 ± 0.6	Hercules	18^{h} 07^{m} 01.53971^{s} +30° 33′ 43.6896″	K4V	8.45	.00607	
Gliese 758		50.5 ± 0.5	Lyra	19^{h} 23^{m} 34.01317^{s} +33° 13′ 19.0784″	G8V	6.36	.00607	
WISE 0542-1628		50.6	Lepus	05^{h} 42^{m} 31.28^{s} −16° 28′ 28.90″	T6.5	16.57	.00606	
WISE 1124-0421		50.6			T7			
WISE 2015+6646		50.6			T8			
Gliese 3685/3686		50.7 ^{+11.8}_{−8.0}	Leo	11^{h} 47^{m} 40.74723^{s} +00° 15′ 20.1018″	MV			
HD 38858		50.8 ± 0.9	Orion	05^{h} 48^{m} 34.94026^{s} −04° 05′ 40.7218″	G4V	5.97		has 1 known planet
HD 135599		50.8 ± 0.8			KV			
Gliese 778		50.8 ± 0.7			KV			
Mu Arae (Cervantes/HD 160691)		50.89 ± 0.07	Ara	17^{h} 44^{m} 08.70314^{s} −51° 50′ 02.5916″	G3IV–V	5.15		
Tau Boötis (Tepiamenit)		50.9 ± 0.6	Boötes	13^{h} 47^{m} 15.7382^{s} +17° 27′ 24.810″	F6IV	4.50		has 1 known planet
Gliese 1175		50.9 ± 0.6			KV			
WISE 1519+7009		50.9			T8			
HD 207129		51.0 ± 0.6	Grus	21^{h} 48^{m} 15.7512^{s} −47° 18′ 13.018″	G2V	5.58		
Gliese 782		51.1 ± 1.2			KV			
Gliese 397		51.1 ± 1.0			KV			has 1 known planet
HD 113538		51.2 ± 1.1	Centaurus	13^{h} 04^{m} 57.47645^{s} −52° 26′ 34.5284″	K9V	9.057		has 2 known planets
WISE 0325-3854		51.2			T9			
WISE 2342+0856		51.2			T6.5			
HD 139763		51.3 ± 1.1			KV			
Gliese 157		51.4 ± 1.7			KV			
WISE 0614+0951		51.5			T7			
WISE 0750+2725		51.5			T8.5			
WISE 0906+4735		51.5			T8			
WISE 1906+4508		51.5			T6			
Gliese 3929		51.54	Corona Borealis	15^{h} 58^{m} 18.80^{s} +35° 24′ 24.3″	M3.5V	12.675		Has 2 known planets and 1 candidate
Chi Herculis		51.7 ± 0.4	Hercules	15^{h} 52^{m} 40.54105^{s} +42° 27′ 05.4629″	F8Ve	4.62		
104 Tauri		51.8 ± 0.8	Taurus	05^{h} 07^{m} 27.00529^{s} +18° 38′ 42.1815″	G4V	4.92		
Gliese 777	A	51.8 ± 0.5	Cygnus	20^{h} 03^{m} 37.405^{s} +29° 53′ 48.49″	G6IV	5.71/14.40		has 3 known planets
Gliese 777	B	51.8 ± 0.5	Cygnus	20^{h} 03^{m} 37.405^{s} +29° 53′ 48.49″	M4.5V			has 3 known planets
Ross 640		51.84 ± 0.02	Hercules	16^{h} 28^{m} 25.0031^{s} +36° 46′ 15.847″	DZA5.5	13.83		
Gliese 619		51.9 ± 0.7			KV			
Gliese 112.1		51.9 ± 1.3			KV			
Gliese 156.2		52.1 ± 0.7			KV			
Gliese 462		52.2 ± 1.1			KV			
Gliese 3		52.2 ± 0.7			KV			
WISE 1457+5815		52.2			T7			
WISE 2319-1844		52.2			T7.5			
WISE 1622-0959		52.2 ± 6.5			T6			
Gliese 3781		52.3 ± 1.2			G8/K0V	7.06		
Gliese 32		52.3 ± 1.4			KV			
Gliese 1062		52.3 ± 2.9	Eridanus	03^{h} 38^{m} 15.69799^{s} −11° 29′ 13.5050″	MV			
HD 179930		52.5 ± 1.7			MV			
Gliese 1264		52.6 ± 2.1			MV			
HR 3138		52.8 ± 0.4			G0V			
Gliese 472		52.8 ± 0.5			KV			
Gliese 824		52.8 ± 0.9			KV			
I Carinae$		52.9 ± 0.4	Carina	10^{h} 24^{m} 23.70597^{s} −74° 01′ 53.8036″	F2IV	3.99#		
Gliese 152		52.9 ± 0.6			KV			
Xi Pegasi	A (Tugongli)	53.0 ± 0.7	Pegasus	22^{h} 46^{m} 41.58118^{s} +12° 10′ 22.3854″	F6V	4.195/11.70		
Xi Pegasi	B	53.0 ± 0.7	Pegasus	22^{h} 46^{m} 41.58118^{s} +12° 10′ 22.3854″	M3.5			
10 Ursae Majoris		53.0 ± 0.9	Ursa Major	09^{h} 00^{m} 38.38067^{s} +41° 46′ 58.6051″	F4V	3.96		
WISE 1042-3842		53.2			T6.5			
HR 6516		53.3 ± 0.8	Ophiuchus	17^{h} 30^{m} 23.79699^{s} −01° 03′ 46.4882″	G9IV-V	5.31		
9 Puppis		53.4 ± 0.8	Puppis	07^{h} 51^{m} 46.30295^{s} −13° 53′ 52.9169″	G2V	5.16		
Gliese 143		53.4 ± 1.3	Reticulum	03^{h} 26^{m} 59.22^{s} −63° 29′ 56.9″	KV			has 2 known planets
Gliese 1177		53.4 ± 2.7			KV			has 1 known planet
Gliese 826.1		53.4 ± 1.2			KV			
HD 40887		53.4 ± 0.9			K3V			
Alpha Circini (Xami)$		53.5 ± 0.5	Circinus*	14^{h} 42^{m} 30.41958^{s} −64° 58′ 30.4934″	A7 Vp SrCrE	3.18-3.21#		Variable
Gliese 247		53.5 ± 1.2	Lynx	06^{h} 49^{m} 57.0256^{s} +60° 20′ 07.9606″	KV			
BPM 37093		53.5 ^{+9.7}_{−7.1}	Centaurus	12^{h} 38^{m} 49.78112^{s} −49° 48′ 00.2195″	DAV4.4	14.0		Variable
WISE 2237-0614		53.5			T5	17.40		
BY Draconis		53.6 ± 0.6	Draco	18^{h} 33^{m} 55.7728^{s} +51° 43′ 08.905″	K6Ve	8.07		
Gliese 531		53.6 ± 0.8			KV			
Gliese 676	A	53.7 ± 1.5	Ara	17^{h} 30^{m} 11.20^{s} −51° 38′ 13.1″	M0V	9.59		has 4 known planets
Gliese 676	B	53.7 ± 1.5	Ara	17^{h} 30^{m} 11.20^{s} −51° 38′ 13.1″	M3V			has 4 known planets
Gliese 322		53.8 ± 1.3			KV			
WISE 0241-3653		53.8			T7			
Psi5 Aurigae		53.9 ± 0.6	Auriga	06^{h} 46^{m} 44.337^{s} +43° 34′ 38.73″	G0V	5.25		
HD 53705/53706/53680		53.9 ± 0.9	Puppis	07^{h} 03^{m} 57.315^{s} −43° 36′ 28.93″	GV			
Gliese 553		53.9 ± 1.4			KV			
Gliese 1049		53.9 ± 1.2			MV			
HD 128311		54.0 ± 0.9	Boötes	14^{h} 36^{m} 00.56073^{s} +09° 44′ 47.4536″	K0V	7.51		has 2 known planets and 1 candidate
Wolf 1130	A	54.09 ± 0.02	Cygnus	20^{h} 05^{m} 02.1951^{s} +54° 26′ 03.234″	M3	13.883±0.007		The closest type Ia supernova candidate to Earth.
Wolf 1130	B	54.09 ± 0.02	Cygnus	20^{h} 05^{m} 02.1951^{s} +54° 26′ 03.234″	D			The closest type Ia supernova candidate to Earth.
HR 5273		54.1 ± 0.7			GV			
WISE 0656+4205		54.1			T3			
WISE 2348-1028		54.1			T7			
Gliese 3839		54.36 ± 1.92			M4.5V			
WISE 1804+3117		54.4 ^{+12.2}_{−8.4}			T9.5			
WISE 0148-7202		54.4 ^{+19.8}_{−11.4}			T9.5			
Gliese 633		54.47 ± 0.98			M2.5V			
Beta Cassiopeiae (Caph)$		54.5 ± 0.5	Cassiopeia	00^{h} 09^{m} 10.68518^{s} +59° 08′ 59.2120″	F2III	2.28#		
HR 2225		54.5 ± 0.7	Canis Major	06^{h} 13^{m} 45.29538^{s} −23° 51′ 42.9715″	GV			
Gliese 795		54.5 ± 2.0			KV			
39 Tauri		54.6 ± 0.8	Taurus	04^{h} 05^{m} 20.258^{s} +22° 00′ 32.06″	G5V	5.90		
A 2329		54.6 ± 1.1			KV			
Gliese 295		54.8 ± 0.7			G8V	6.98		
Gliese 1181		54.8 ± 2.5			KV			
Gliese 786		54.8 ± 0.7			KV			
WISE 0333-5856		54.8			T3			
WISE 2357+1227		54.8			T6			
HD 7924		54.9 ± 0.5	Cassiopeia	01^{h} 21^{m} 59.11373^{s} +76° 42′ 37.0383″	K0V	7.185		has 3 known planets
System	Star or (sub-) brown dwarf	Distance (ly)	Constellation	Coordinates: RA, Dec (Ep J2000, Eq J2000)	Stellar class	Apparent magnitude (V)	Parallax (mas)	Notes and additional references

== See also ==
- Lists of stars
- List of star systems within 45–50 light-years
- List of star systems within 55–60 light-years
- List of nearest stars and brown dwarfs
