= List of star systems within 55–60 light-years =

This is a list of star systems within 55–60 light years of Earth.

== List ==
Key
#	Visible to the unaided eye (apparent magnitude of +6.5 or lower)
$	Bright star (absolute magnitude of +8.5 or brighter)
‡	White dwarf
§	Brown dwarf or sub-brown dwarf
*	Nearest in constellation

System	Star or (sub-) brown dwarf	Distance (ly)	Constellation	Coordinates: RA, Dec (Ep J2000, Eq J2000)	Stellar class	Apparent magnitude (V)	Parallax (mas)	Notes and additional references
HR 2721		55.0 ± 0.6	Lynx		G0V	5.54#		
Gliese 895.4		55.0 ± 0.6	Carina		KV			
Gliese 200		55.0 ± 1.6	Orion		KV			
HD 152391		55.2 ± 0.8	Ophiuchus		GV			
Gliese 886		55.2 ± 3.4	Aquarius		KV			
Gliese 565		55.3 ± 1	Libra		KV			
WISE 0366-0143		55.4	Eridanus		T?			
WISE 1225-1013		55.4	Virgo		T6			
WISE 1612-3420		55.4	Scorpio		T6.5			
WISE 1852+3537		55.4	Lyra		T7			
HD 7924		55.45 ± 0.02	Carina	01^{h} 21^{m} 59.11373^{s} +76° 42′ 37.0383″	K0.5V	7.167		Has 3 exoplanets
HR 2997		55.6 ± 0.5	Camelopardalis		GV			
Gliese 728		55.7 ± 1.5	Hercules		KV			
HD 76151		55.8 ± 0.8	Hydra	08^{h} 54^{m} 17.9471^{s} −05° 26′ 04.054″	G3V	6.00#		
HR 7232		56.0 ± 0.9	Corona Australis		GV			
HR 4864		56.0 ± 1	Andromeda		GV			
WISE 0245-3450		56.1	Fornax		T8			
WISE 1320+6034		56.1	Ursa Major		T6.5			
Iota Horologii		56.2 ± 0.5	Horologium	02^{h} 42^{m} 33.46667^{s} −50° 48′ 01.0551″	G0Vp	5.40#		has 1 known planet
Gliese 3076		56.23 ± 6.28	Pisces		M5.93			
37 Geminorum		56.3 ± 0.9	Gemini	06^{h} 55^{m} 18.66636^{s} +25° 22′ 32.5036″	G0V	5.73#	06^{h} 55^{m} 18.66636^{s} +25° 22′ 32.5036″	
HD 3765		56.3 ± 1	Andromeda	00^{h} 40^{m} 49.270^{s} +40° 11′ 13.82″	KV			
Gliese 3476		56.4 ± 0.6	Virgo		KV			
HIP 92444		56.4 ± 1.9	Sagittarius		KV			
Gliese 3222		56.4 ± 0.7	Vela		KV			
ADS 9544		56.4 ± 0.8	Serpens		KV			
Gliese 727		56.4 ± 1	Aquila		KV			
Tau¹ Hydrae		56.5 ± 2.2	Hydra	09^{h} 29^{m} 08.89655^{s} −02° 46′ 08.2649″	F6V	4.59#		
Gliese 3833		56.5 ± 1	Boötes		KV			
DENIS-P J1058.7-1548		56.5 ± 1	Crater	10^{h} 58^{m} 47.870^{s} −15° 48′ 17.23″	L3			
q¹ Eridani		56.6 ± 0.6	Eridanus	01^{h} 42^{m} 29.3145^{s} −53° 44′ 26.991″	F9V	5.52#		has 1 known planet
HR 6748		56.6 ± 0.8	Sagittarius		GV			
HD 184467		56.6 ± 0.6	Draco		KV			
Gliese 913		56.6 ± 2.9	Andromeda		MV			
Xi Ophiuchi		56.7 ± 0.9	Ophiuchus	17^{h} 21^{m} 00.37452^{s} −21° 06′ 46.5710″	F2V	4.39#		
10 Canum Venaticorum		56.7 ± 0.6	Canis Venatici	12^{h} 44^{m} 59.405^{s} +39° 16′ 44.10″	G0V	5.95#		
BD +68 278		56.7 ± 2.8	Camelopardalis		KV			
Rho Coronae Borealis		56.8 ± 0.7	Corona Borealis	16^{h} 01^{m} 02.66049^{s} +33° 18′ 12.6395″	G0V	5.40#		has 4 known planets
HD 126053	A$	56.95 ±0.04	Virgo		G1V	6.25#		has one known planet
HD 126053	B§	56.95 ±0.04	Virgo		sdT7.5			has one known planet
Chi Eridani$		57.0 ± 0.6	Eridanus	01^{h} 55^{m} 57.45606^{s} −51° 36′ 31.9736″	G8IV	3.70#		
39 Serpentis		57.0 ± 0.9	Serpens	15^{h} 53^{m} 12.19^{s} +13° 11′ 52.8″	GV			
Gliese 293.1		57.0 ± 1.5	Monoceros		KV			
Gliese 397.1		57.0 ± 1.4			MV			
g Lupi		57.1 ± 0.7	Lupus	15^{h} 41^{m} 11.3768^{s} −44° 39′ 40.342″	F5V	4.64#		
Gliese 649.1		57.1 ± 0.7			KV			
WISE 0247+3725		57.1	Pisces		T8			
G 29-38 (ZZ Piscium)		57.16 ± 0.03	Pisces	23^{h} 28^{m} 47.6365^{s} +05° 14′ 54.235″	DAV4.4	13.03		
Xi Geminorum (Alzirr)$		57.2 ± 0.8	Gemini	06^{h} 45^{m} 17.36432^{s} +12° 53′ 44.1311″	F5IV	3.35#		
58 Ophiuchi		57.2 ± 0.8	Ophiuchus	17^{h} 43^{m} 25.79354^{s} −21° 40′ 59.4989″	F5V	4.87#		
Gliese 241		57.2 ± 1.4	Gemini		KV			
Gliese 3633		57.2 ± 1	Leo		KV			
VVV BD001		57.2 ^{+4.3}_{−3.8}	Ophiuchus		L5			
59 Virginis		57.3 ± 0.3	Virgo	13^{h} 16^{m} 46.51486^{s} +09° 25′ 26.9601″	G0V	5.22#		has 1 known planet
HR 7783		57.3 ± 0.5	Draco		GV			
HR 5384		57.4 ± 1.1	Carina		GV			
HD 113194		57.4 ± 1.1	Hydra		KV			
Gliese 562		57.4 ± 1.3	Boötes		KV			
WISE 0528-3308		57.4	Columba		T7 pec			
HD 1237		57.5 ± 0.5	Hydrus	00^{h} 16^{m} 12.6791^{s} −79° 51′ 04.2447″	G6V	6.59		has 1 known planet
Gliese 1066		57.5 ± 0.9			KV			
15 Sagittae	A	57.6 ± 0.6	Sagitta	20^{h} 04^{m} 06.22077^{s} +17° 04′ 12.6766″	G0V	5.8#		
15 Sagittae	B	57.6 ± 0.6	Sagitta	20^{h} 04^{m} 06.22077^{s} +17° 04′ 12.6766″	L4			
83 Leonis	A	57.6 ± 1.5	Leo	11^{h} 26^{m} 45.32173^{s} +03° 00′ 47.1566″	K0IV	6.49/7.57#		has 2 known planets
83 Leonis	B	57.6 ± 1.5	Leo	11^{h} 26^{m} 45.32173^{s} +03° 00′ 47.1566″	K2V			has 2 known planets
Gliese 819		57.6 ± 1.2			KV			
HD 30876		57.7	Caelum*		K2V			
Delta Leonis (Zosma)$		57.7 ± 0.9	Leo	11^{h} 14^{m} 06.50142^{s} +20° 31′ 25.3853″	A4V	2.56#		
Gliese 340		57.7 ± 1.1			KV			
WISE 0138-0322		57.7	Cetus		T2			
WISE 0611-0410		57.7	Monoceros		T0			
WISE 1122+2550		57.7	Leo	11^{h} 22^{m} 55.50^{s} +25° 50′ 25.07″	T6			
HR 7644		57.8 ± 0.8			GV			has 1 known planet
Gliese 626		57.8 ± 1.4			KV			
Iota Pavonis		57.9 ± 0.7	Pavo	18^{h} 10^{m} 26.15370^{s} −62° 00′ 07.9922″	GV			
HD 35650		57.9 ± 1			KV			
HD 82443		57.9 ± 0.9			KV			
HR 5356		58.0 ± 1			FV			
HR 4525		58.0 ± 0.8			GV			
Gliese 365		58.0 ± 1.2			KV			
HR 2401		58.2 ± 0.6			FV			
V833 Tauri		58.2 ± 1.3	Taurus	04^{h} 36^{m} 48.2422^{s} +27° 07′ 55.888″	KV			
Alpha Comae Berenices (Diadem)	A	58.3 ± 1.5	Coma Berenices	13^{h} 09^{m} 59.285^{s} +17° 31′ 46.04″	F5V	4.85/5.53#		
Alpha Comae Berenices (Diadem)	B	58.3 ± 1.5	Coma Berenices	13^{h} 09^{m} 59.285^{s} +17° 31′ 46.04″	F5V			
Eta Coronae Borealis	A	58.3 ± 0.8	Corona Borealis	15^{h} 23^{m} 12.305^{s} +30° 17′ 16.17″	G1V	5.02#		
Eta Coronae Borealis	B	58.3 ± 0.8	Corona Borealis	15^{h} 23^{m} 12.305^{s} +30° 17′ 16.17″	G3V			
Eta Coronae Borealis	C	58.3 ± 0.8	Corona Borealis	15^{h} 23^{m} 12.305^{s} +30° 17′ 16.17″	L8			
Gamma Coronae Australis	A	58.4 ± 2.1	Corona Australis	19^{h} 06^{m} 25.11014^{s} −37° 03′ 48.3901″	F8V	4.20#		
Gamma Coronae Australis	B	58.4 ± 2.1	Corona Australis	19^{h} 06^{m} 25.11014^{s} −37° 03′ 48.3901″	F8V			
WISE 0206+2640		58.4	Aries		L9 pec			
Tau^{6} Eridani		58.5 ± 0.7	Eridanus	03^{h} 46^{m} 50.88819^{s} −23° 14′ 59.0046″	F5V	4.20#		
HD 130948		58.5 ± 0.9		14^{h} 50^{m} 15.8110^{s} +23° 54′ 42.634″	G1V	5.99#		
Gliese 1079		58.5 ± 0.8			KV			
Gliese 787		58.5 ± 1.4			KV			
Gliese 418		58.5 ± 1.4			KV			
Iota Centauri (Alhakim/Kulou)$		58.6 ± 0.8	Centaurus	13^{h} 20^{m} 35.81737^{s} −36° 42′ 44.2447″	A2V	2.73#		
Gliese 2037		58.6 ± 1			KV			
Gliese 3317		58.7 ± 0.8			KV			
Gliese 18		58.7 ± 1.2			KV			
WISE 2213+0911		58.7			T7			
DG Canum Venaticorum		58.76 ± 2.32	Canis Venatici	13^{h} 31^{m} 46.617^{s} +29° 16′ 36.72″	M4Ve			
HR 4989		58.8 ± 0.7		13^{h} 14^{m} 15.14474^{s} −59° 06′ 11.6540″	FIV			
212 Puppis	A	58.8 ± 0.6	Puppis		F5V	5.12/8.59#		
212 Puppis	B	58.8 ± 0.6	Puppis		K3V			
Delta Geminorum (Wasat)$	A	58.8 ± 0.9	Gemini	07^{h} 20^{m} 07.37978^{s} +21° 58′ 56.3377″	F0IV	3.53#		
Delta Geminorum (Wasat)$	B	58.8 ± 0.9	Gemini	07^{h} 20^{m} 07.37978^{s} +21° 58′ 56.3377″	KV			
Gliese 1240		58.8 ± 1			KV			
Rho Geminorum	A	58.9 ± 0.3	Gemini	07^{h} 29^{m} 06.719^{s} +31° 47′ 04.38″	F1V	4.25/12.5/7.74#		
Rho Geminorum	B	58.9 ± 0.3	Gemini	07^{h} 29^{m} 06.719^{s} +31° 47′ 04.38″	M5			
Rho Geminorum	C	58.9 ± 0.3	Gemini	07^{h} 29^{m} 06.719^{s} +31° 47′ 04.38″	K2.5V			
HD 154345		58.9 ± 0.6		17^{h} 02^{m} 36.40381^{s} +47° 04′ 54.7642″	G8V	6.74		has 1 known planet
HR 3220 (B Carinae)	A	58.9 ± 0.6	Carina	08^{h} 09^{m} 00.56958^{s} −61° 18′ 08.5836″	F6 V Fe-0.8 CH-0.4	4.75#		
HR 3220 (B Carinae)	B	58.9 ± 0.6	Carina	08^{h} 09^{m} 00.56958^{s} −61° 18′ 08.5836″	D			
Gliese 830		58.9 ± 1.5			KV			
HD 87883		58.9 ± 1		10^{h} 08^{m} 43.14059^{s} +34° 14′ 32.1466″	K0V	7.56		has 1 known planet
Gliese 3293		59		04^{h} 28^{m} 35.71911^{s} −25° 10′ 09.2979″	M2.5V	11.96		has 4 known planets
HD 154088		59.0 ± 0.9		17^{h} 04^{m} 27.843^{s} −28° 34′ 57.64″	K0V	6.726		has 1 known planet
70 Virginis		59.1 ± 0.8	Virgo	13^{h} 28^{m} 25.8086^{s} +13° 46′ 43.638″	G2.5Va	5.00#		has 1 known planet
HR 2208		59.1 ± 1			GV			
Chi Cancri		59.2 ± 1	Cancer	08^{h} 20^{m} 03.861^{s} +27° 13′ 03.74″	F6V	5.14#		
14 Herculis		59.2 ± 0.6	Hercules	16^{h} 10^{m} 24.31568^{s} +43° 49′ 03.5074″	K0V	6.67		has 2 known planets
Gliese 4008		59.3 ± 0.9			KV			
Eta Corvi		59.4 ± 0.7	Corvus	12^{h} 32^{m} 04.22653^{s} −16° 11′ 45.6165″	F2V	4.31#		
Pi Mensae		59.4 ± 0.5	Mensa	05^{h} 37^{m} 09.88684^{s} −80° 28′ 08.8346″	G1IV	5.67#		has 3 known planets
HIP 38939		59.4 ± 1.3			KV			
Epsilon Reticuli	A	59.5 ± 0.5	Reticulum	04^{h} 16^{m} 29.028^{s} −59° 18′ 07.76″	K2IV	4.44/12.5#		has 1 known planet
Epsilon Reticuli	B	59.5 ± 0.5	Reticulum	04^{h} 16^{m} 29.028^{s} −59° 18′ 07.76″	D			has 1 known planet
Beta Arietis (Sheratan)$	A	59.6 ± 0.8	Aries	01^{h} 54^{m} 38.41099^{s} +20° 48′ 28.9133″	A5V	2.655#		
Beta Arietis (Sheratan)$	B	59.6 ± 0.8	Aries	01^{h} 54^{m} 38.41099^{s} +20° 48′ 28.9133″	G2V			
Psi Velorum	A	59.7 ± 1	Vela	09^{h} 30^{m} 41.99958^{s} −40° 28′ 00.2616″	F3IV	3.60#		
Psi Velorum	B	59.7 ± 1	Vela	09^{h} 30^{m} 41.99958^{s} −40° 28′ 00.2616″	F0V			
Gliese 1106		59.7 ^{+5.1}_{−4.4}			KV			
WISE 2239+1617		59.7			T3			
Gliese 1120		59.8 ^{+3.7}_{−3.3}			KV			
Gliese 3488		59.8 ± 1.4			KV			
LQ Hydrae		59.8 ± 1.1	Hydra	09^{h} 32^{m} 25.568^{s} −11° 11′ 04.69″	KV			
Gliese 131		59.9 ± 1.5			KV			
System	Star or (sub-) brown dwarf	Distance (ly)	Constellation	Coordinates: RA, Dec (Ep J2000, Eq J2000)	Stellar class	Apparent magnitude (V)	Parallax (mas)	Notes and additional references

== See also ==
- Lists of stars
- List of star systems within 50–55 light-years
- List of star systems within 60–65 light-years
- List of nearest stars and brown dwarfs
