= HD 43162 =

Quadruple star system in constellation Canis Major

- Location of HD 43162 (circled)

Observation data Epoch J2000 Equinox ICRS
- Constellation: Canis Major
- HD 43162 A
- Right ascension: 06^{h} 13^{m} 45.29538^{s}
- Declination: −23° 51′ 42.9715″
- Apparent magnitude (V): +6.37 - 6.40
- HD 43162 B
- Right ascension: 06^{h} 13^{m} 45.40574^{s}
- Declination: −23° 52′ 07.5731″
- Apparent magnitude (V): +12.5 (combined)
- HD 43162 C
- Right ascension: 06^{h} 13^{m} 47.17685^{s}
- Declination: −23° 54′ 24.8191″
- Apparent magnitude (V): +12.96

Characteristics

HD 43162 A
- Spectral type: G6.5V
- B−V color index: 0.702
- J−H color index: 0.266
- J−K color index: 0.403
- Variable type: BY Draconis variable

HD 43162 B
- Spectral type: M3.5 / M5
- J−H color index: 0.579 / ?
- J−K color index: 0.835 / ?

HD 43162 C
- Spectral type: dM3.5e
- B−V color index: 1.36
- J−H color index: 0.563
- J−K color index: 0.851
- Variable type: Flare star

Astrometry

HD 43162 A
Radial velocity (R_{v})	21.91±0.09 km/s
Proper motion (μ)	RA: -47.564 mas/yr Dec.: 111.085 mas/yr
Parallax (π)	59.885±0.0192 mas
Distance	54.46 ± 0.02 ly (16.699 ± 0.005 pc)

HD 43162 B
Radial velocity (R_{v})	22.9±0.2 km/s
Proper motion (μ)	RA: -36.865 mas/yr Dec.: 124.763 mas/yr
Parallax (π)	59.377±0.4216 mas
Distance	54.9 ± 0.4 ly (16.8 ± 0.1 pc)

HD 43162 C
Proper motion (μ)	RA: -31.239 mas/yr Dec.: 111.054 mas/yr
Parallax (π)	59.9905±0.0222 mas
Distance	54.37 ± 0.02 ly (16.669 ± 0.006 pc)

Orbit
Primary	HD 43162 A
Name	HD 43162 B
Semi-major axis (a)	24" (410 AU)

Orbit
Primary	HD 43162 A
Name	HD 43162 C
Semi-major axis (a)	164" (2740 AU)

Details

HD 43162 A
Mass	0.98+0.02 −0.01 M_{☉}
Surface gravity (log g)	4.550±0.025 cgs
Temperature	5858±13 K
Metallicity [Fe/H]	0.025±0.009 dex
Rotation	7.24±0.22 d
Age	0.90+0.25 −0.27 Gyr

HD 43162 Ba
Temperature	3265+165 −85 K

HD 43162 Bb
Temperature	3180+85 −170 K

Other designations
- HD 43162, WDS J6138-2352
- HD 43162 A: V352 CMa, CD−23°3577, CPD−23°1125, GC 7961, GJ 3389, HIP 29568, HR 2225, SAO 171428, PPM 250051, TIC 124494439, TYC 6505-2273-1, GSC 06505-02273, 2MASS J06134528-2351433
- HD 43162 B: TIC 124494444, 2MASS J06134539-2352077, DENIS J061345.3-235207, WISE J061345.36-235206.3
- HD 43162 C: TIC 124494465, 2MASS J06134717-2354250, DENIS J061347.1-235424, WISE J061347.14-235423.7, WISEA J061347.14-235423.6, EUVE J0613-23.9B, USNO-B1.0 0660-00076188

Database references
SIMBAD	A
- B
- C

HD 43162 is a star system consisting of a young solar analog star orbited by a pair of red dwarfs and another solitary red dwarf farther away. It is located about 54.5 light-years (16.7 parsecs) away in the southern constellation of Canis Major, making it one of the closest quadruple star systems. With an apparent magnitude of about 6.4, it is barely visible to the naked eye under dark skies far from city lights.

In 1999, Giuseppe Cutispoto et al. announced their discovery that HD 43162 is a variable star. It was given its variable star designation, V352 Canis Majoris (often abbreviated to V352 CMa), in 2006.

== HD 43162 A ==
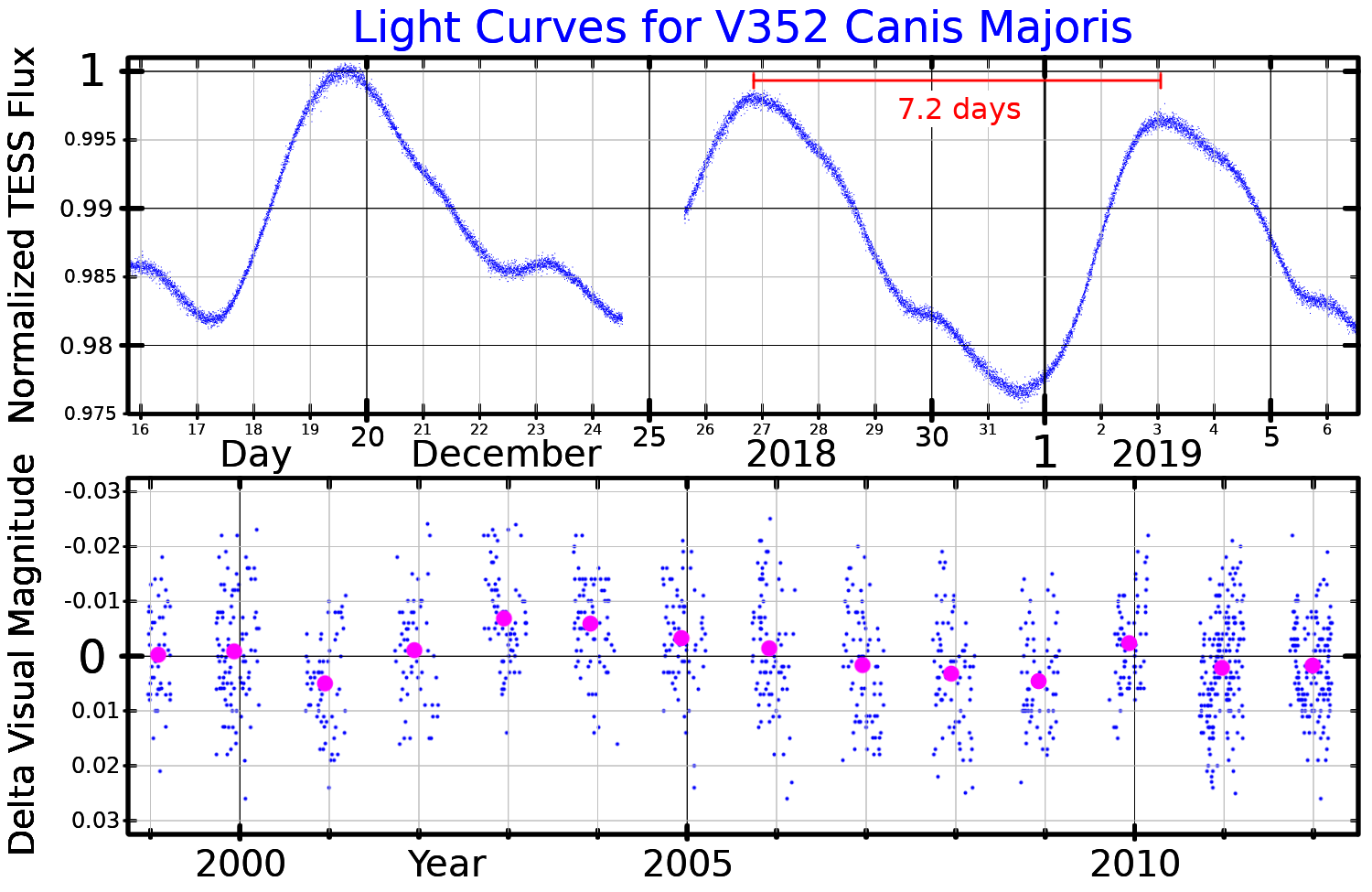
Two light curves for HD 43162. The upper panel, plotted from TESS data, shows the short term variability with the 7.2 day rotation period marked in red. The lower panel, adapted from Kajatkari et al. shows the variability on a timescale of years, with yearly mean values plotted in purple.

HD 43162 A, often simply HD 43162, is an active G-type main sequence star with the spectral type G6.5V. It is a BY Draconis variable with a long brightness cycle lasting 11.7±0.5 years. Though estimates on the star's age vary substantially, the star is likely young based on the strong calcium H and K emission lines (wavelengths 3968.469 Å and 3933.663 Å), high X-ray luminosity, rapid rotation, and its richness in lithium, though its metallicity ([Fe/H]) does not match the star's young age. The metallicity and its motion through space connotes that the star belongs to the young disk population, part of the Milky Way's thin disk.

The star has been noted to be abnormally poor in carbon, with a carbon-oxygen ratio calculated at [C/O]=−0.17±0.05 dex, despite having typical oxygen and iron abundances for solar-like stars. While oxygen is known to originate in the supernovae of massive stars, the origin of carbon remains unclear, and thus the reason for this anomalous carbon abundance is still unknown.

In 2009, the star became one of eleven stars discovered to be surrounded by debris disks by the Spitzer Space Telescope, alongside planetary hosts such as Gliese 581, HD 40979, and HD 178911, the latter two also multiple star systems. No planets have been discovered around HD 43162 A, however, the only one out of the eleven without known exoplanets.

Photometric data from the Hipparcos catalog indicates that the photometric variability of the star may be caused by an unresolved companion, which, if true, would make this component a binary system (Aa/Ab) itself, which may push the number of stars in the whole system up to five.

== HD 43162 Ba/Bb (2MASS J0613−2352 AB) ==
HD 43162 B, also known as 2MASS J06134539−2352077, was announced to be a co-moving companion to HD 43162 A in 2013, located at a separation of 24 arcseconds (410 AU) from the primary star. This object had been discovered to be a binary during the Astralux Large M-Dwarf Multiplicity Survey in 2012, and the two components have been determined to be red dwarfs.

The larger of the pair (2MASS J0613−2352A) has a spectral type of M3.5 and a temperature of 3,265 K, while the smaller (B) has the spectral type M5.0 and a temperature of 3,180 K. The two stars have a total mass of 0.57 M_{☉} or 0.42 M_{☉}, with a mass ratio of 0.63:0.37. They orbit each other with a period of 13 years at a distance of 3.91+0.83
−0.11 AU or 4.62+0.06
−0.04 AU, in a high eccentric orbit (eccentricity 0.77+0.10
−0.11 or 0.65±0.01). Due to the possible presence of missing mass, potential remains for the existence of another unseen body within the system.

They are likely part of the Argus Association, which places their age at 45±5 Ma.

== HD 43162 C ==
In 2010, the red dwarf 2MASS J06134717−2354250 was found to be a co-moving companion to HD 43162 A and was initially designated HD 43162 B, before it was re-designated HD 43162 C in 2013. It is situated 164 arcseconds away from the primary, which corresponds to a distance of 2,740 AU. It is a coronally active flare star with a spectral type of dM3.5e.

In 2003, before its physical association with the HD 43162 system was confirmed, the star was reported to have undergone a massive stellar flare, during which a 200-fold increase occurred in extreme ultraviolet (EUV) flux. This translates to a total energy of about 3×10^{34} ergs released in the 60–200 Å wavelength band, which is as energetic as the largest EUV flare that had been observed at the time, seen on AU Microscopii in July 1992.

== See also ==
- HD 53680, HD 53705, and HD 53706: another quadruple system at a similar distance from Earth
