= GQ Leonis =

Star in the constellation Leo

- Location of GQ Leonis (circled)

Observation data Epoch J2000.0 Equinox ICRS
- Constellation: Leo
- Right ascension: 11^{h} 47^{m} 45.72617^{s}
- Declination: +12° 54′ 03.3509″
- Apparent magnitude (V): 10.8

Characteristics
- Spectral type: K5Ve
- B−V color index: 1.020
- J−H color index: 0.608
- J−K color index: 0.782
- Variable type: BY Dra?

Astrometry
Radial velocity (R_{v})	−12.121±0.0020 km/s
Proper motion (μ)	RA: −73.229 mas/yr Dec.: 7.648 mas/yr
Parallax (π)	16.3363±0.1721 mas
Distance	200 ± 2 ly (61.2 ± 0.6 pc)

Orbit
Primary	MET 57Aa
Name	MET 57Ab
Period (P)	~45 yr
Semi-major axis (a)	0.25″

Details
Radius	~0.8 R_{☉}
Surface gravity (log g)	4.345±0.096 cgs
Temperature	4364±113 K
Metallicity [Fe/H]	−0.171±0.036 dex
Rotation	4.45±0.20 d
Rotational velocity (v sin i)	7.2±1.6 km/s
Age	126 or 12±4 Myr

Other designations
- GQ Leo, BPM 87617, TIC 14722732, TYC 870-798-1, GSC 00870-00798, 2MASS J11474574+1254033, Gaia DR3 3922763029242716032

Database references
SIMBAD	data

GQ Leonis (GSC 00870-00798) is a variable star located in the zodiac constellation of Leo, close to the second-magnitude star Denebola. With an apparent magnitude of 10.8, it is too faint to be seen by the naked eye but observable using a telescope with an aperture of 35 mm (1.4 in) or larger. It is situated at a distance of 200 light-years (61 parsecs) according to Gaia EDR3 parallax measurements, and is advancing towards the Solar System at a heliocentric radial velocity of −12.121 km/s.

== Physical properties ==
This is a K-type main-sequence star with the spectral type K5Ve, where the "e" suffix denotes the presence of emission lines. It is considered to be a field star, not part of any star cluster. It is expected to have a radius of about 0.8 R_{☉}, and shines at an effective temperature of 4,364 K (7,396 °F), giving it an orange hue. It is poorer in heavy elements than the Sun with a metallicity of −0.171, meaning it has 10^{−0.171} ≈ 67% the Sun's iron content. Age estimates vary between publications, but the consensus is that it is young and very active, as evidenced by strong emission in the calcium H and K lines and the Balmer series. The star is also a source of X-rays and extreme ultraviolet (EUV) radiation.

== Variability ==
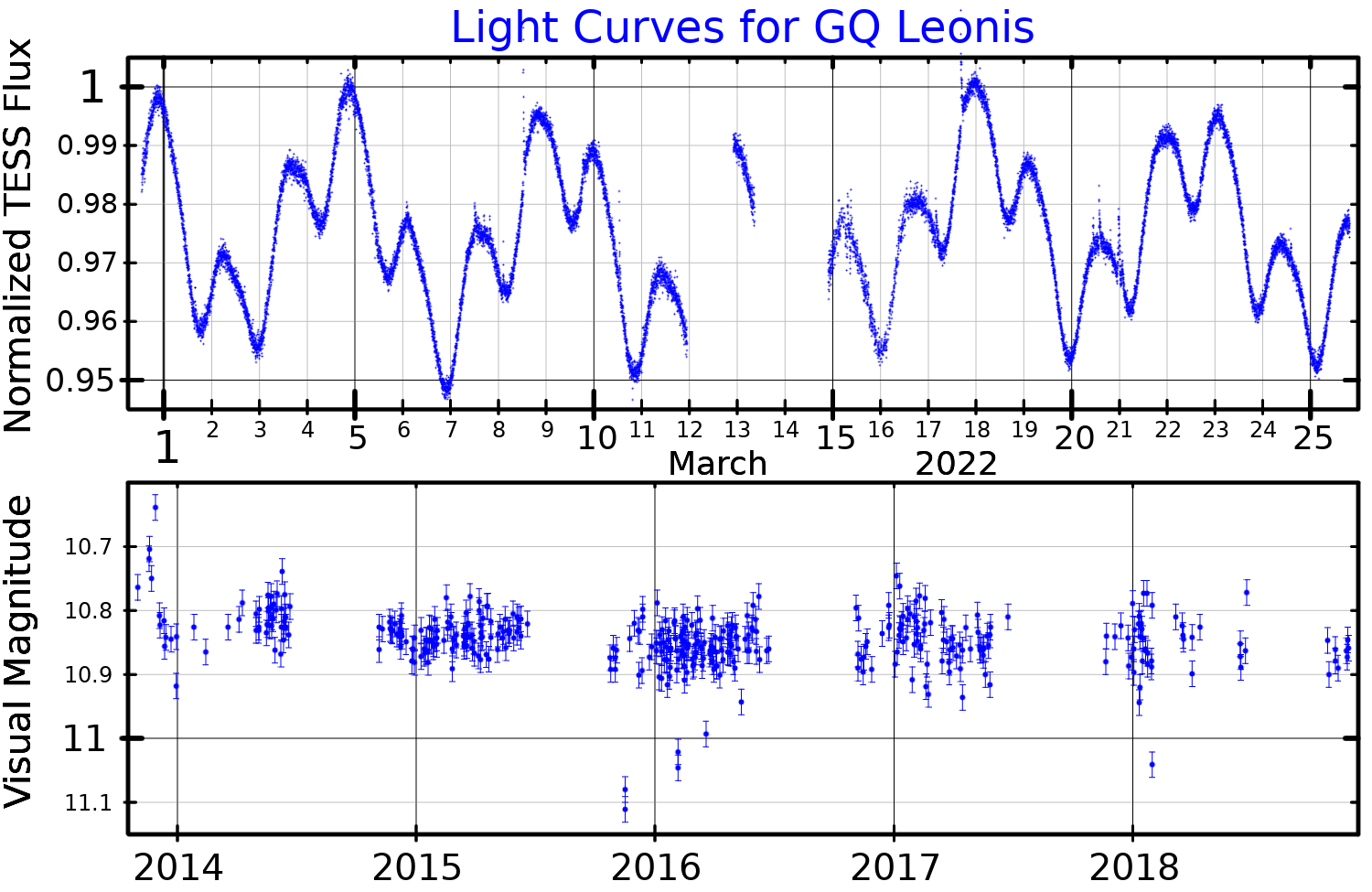
Light curves for GQ Leonis. The upper panel shows the short term variability as seen by TESS, and the lower panel shows the brightness over a much longer time interval as seen by ASASSN.

In 2001, the star was reported to show low-amplitude photometric variations with a period of 4.45 days. It was suspected that the star was a BY Draconis variable due to the period paired with the X-ray and EUV emissions. This was confirmed in 2004 in a paper which also newly classified HD 77191 and V573 Puppis as BY Dra variables. The star received its variable-star designation GQ Leonis in 2003.

== Stellar companions ==
Slow fluctuations are known to occur in the star's radial velocity. In a 2019 study, a 572-day (1.57 a) period was mentioned to fit the observed variations, but other periods remain possible. This object is also a visual binary, designated MET 57Aa/Ab in the Washington Double Star Catalog, with a separation of 0.25 arcseconds and a period of roughly 45 years. Additionally, an optical component (MET 57B) exists 9.5 arcseconds away.
