= HD 166 =

Star in the constellation Andromeda

- Location of HD 166 (circled in red)

Observation data Epoch J2000.0 Equinox ICRS
- Constellation: Andromeda
- Right ascension: 00^{h} 06^{m} 36.78401^{s}
- Declination: +29° 01′ 17.4127″
- Apparent magnitude (V): 6.13 – 6.17

Characteristics
- Evolutionary stage: main sequence
- Spectral type: K0Ve
- U−B color index: +0.30
- B−V color index: +0.755
- Variable type: BY Dra

Astrometry
Radial velocity (R_{v})	−6.75±0.12 km/s
Proper motion (μ)	RA: 380.159 mas/yr Dec.: −177.730 mas/yr
Parallax (π)	72.6419±0.0292 mas
Distance	44.90 ± 0.02 ly (13.766 ± 0.006 pc)
Absolute magnitude (M_{V})	5.41

Details
Mass	0.889 M_{☉}
Radius	0.9172±0.0090 R_{☉}
Luminosity	0.6078±0.0099 L_{☉}
Surface gravity (log g)	4.49±0.09 cgs
Temperature	5509±34 K
Metallicity [Fe/H]	0.00±0.03 dex
Rotation	6.23±0.01 days
Rotational velocity (v sin i)	4.1 km/s
Age	78±28 Myr

Other designations
- V439 And, NSV 33, BD+28°4704, GC 95, GJ 5, HD 166, HIP 544, HR 8, SAO 73743, PPM 89410, ADS 69 A, GSC 01735-00927, GSC 01735-02532

Database references
SIMBAD	data

HD 166 or V439 Andromedae (ADS 69 A) is a 6th magnitude star in the constellation Andromeda, approximately 45 light-years away from Earth. It is a variable star of the BY Draconis type, varying between magnitudes 6.13 and 6.18 with a 6.23 days periodicity. It appears within one degree of the star Alpha Andromedae and is a member of the Hercules-Lyra association moving group. It also happens to be less than 2 degrees from right ascension 00h 00m.

== Star characteristics ==
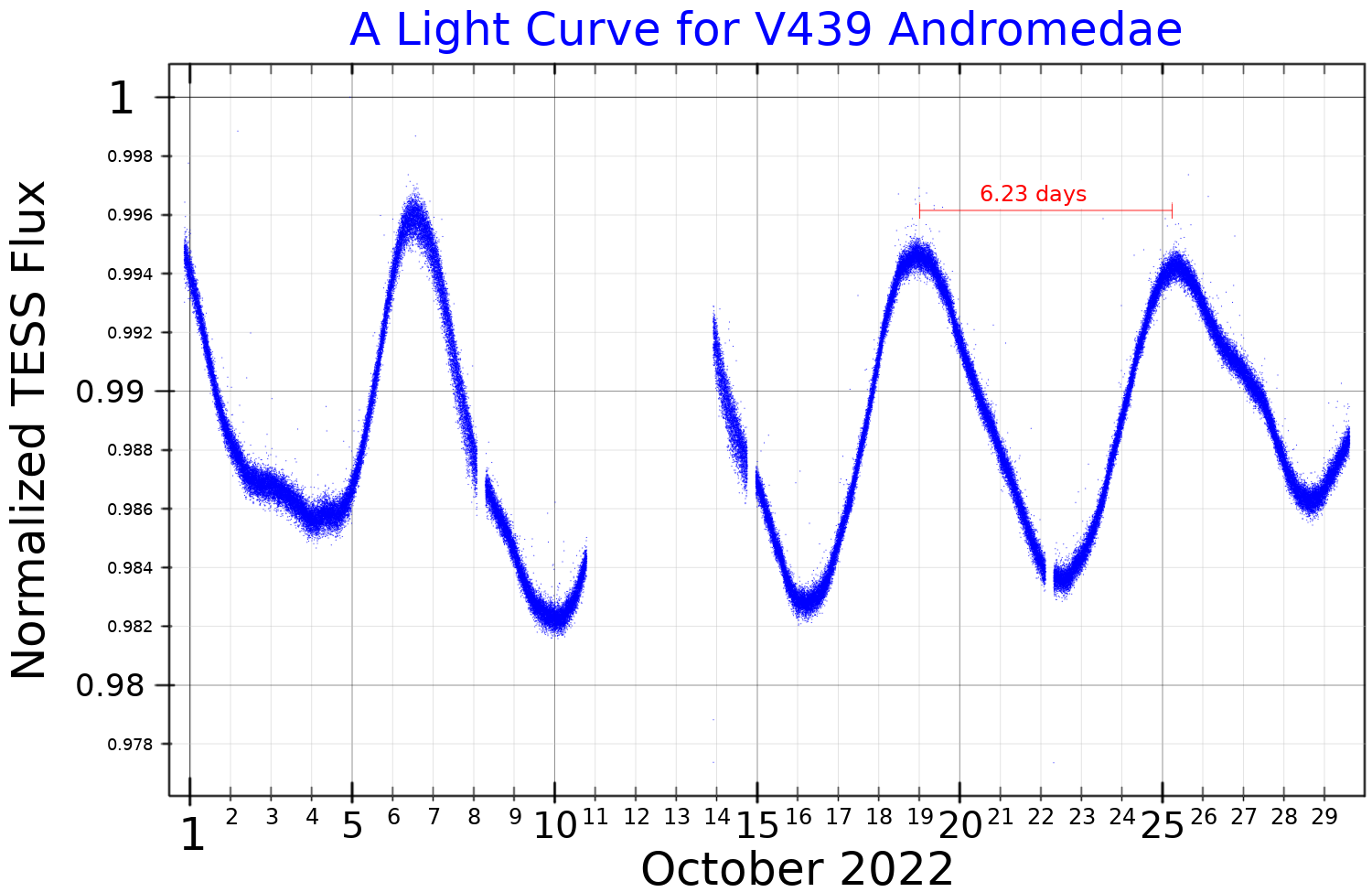
A light curve for V439 Andromedae, plotted from TESS data, with the 6.23 day rotation period shown in red

HD 166 is a K-type main sequence star, cooler and dimmer than the Sun, and has a stellar classification of K0Ve where the e suffix indicates the presence of emission lines in the spectrum. The star has a proper motion of 0.422 arcseconds per year in a direction 114.1° from north. It has an estimated visual luminosity of 61% of the Sun, and is emitting like a blackbody with an effective temperature of 5,327K. It has a diameter that is about 90% the size of the Sun and a radial velocity of −6.9 km/s. Age estimates range from as low as 78 million years old based on its chromospheric activity, up to 9.6 billion years based on a comparison with theoretical evolutionary tracks. X-ray emission has been detected from this star, with an estimated luminosity of 8.5×10^{28} erg s^{−1}.

An infrared excess has been detected around HD 166, most likely indicating the presence of a circumstellar disk at a radius of 7.5 AU. The temperature of this dust is 90 K.

== Variability ==
Eric J. Gaidos et al. first detected variability in HD 166 in the year 2000. It was given its variable star designation, V439 Andromedae, in 2006. It has been found that the periodicity in the photometric variability of HD 166 is coincident with the rotation period. This leads to its classification as a BY Draconis variable, where brightness variations are caused by the presence of large starspots on the surface and by chromospheric activity.
