= FF Andromedae =

Star in the constellation Andromeda

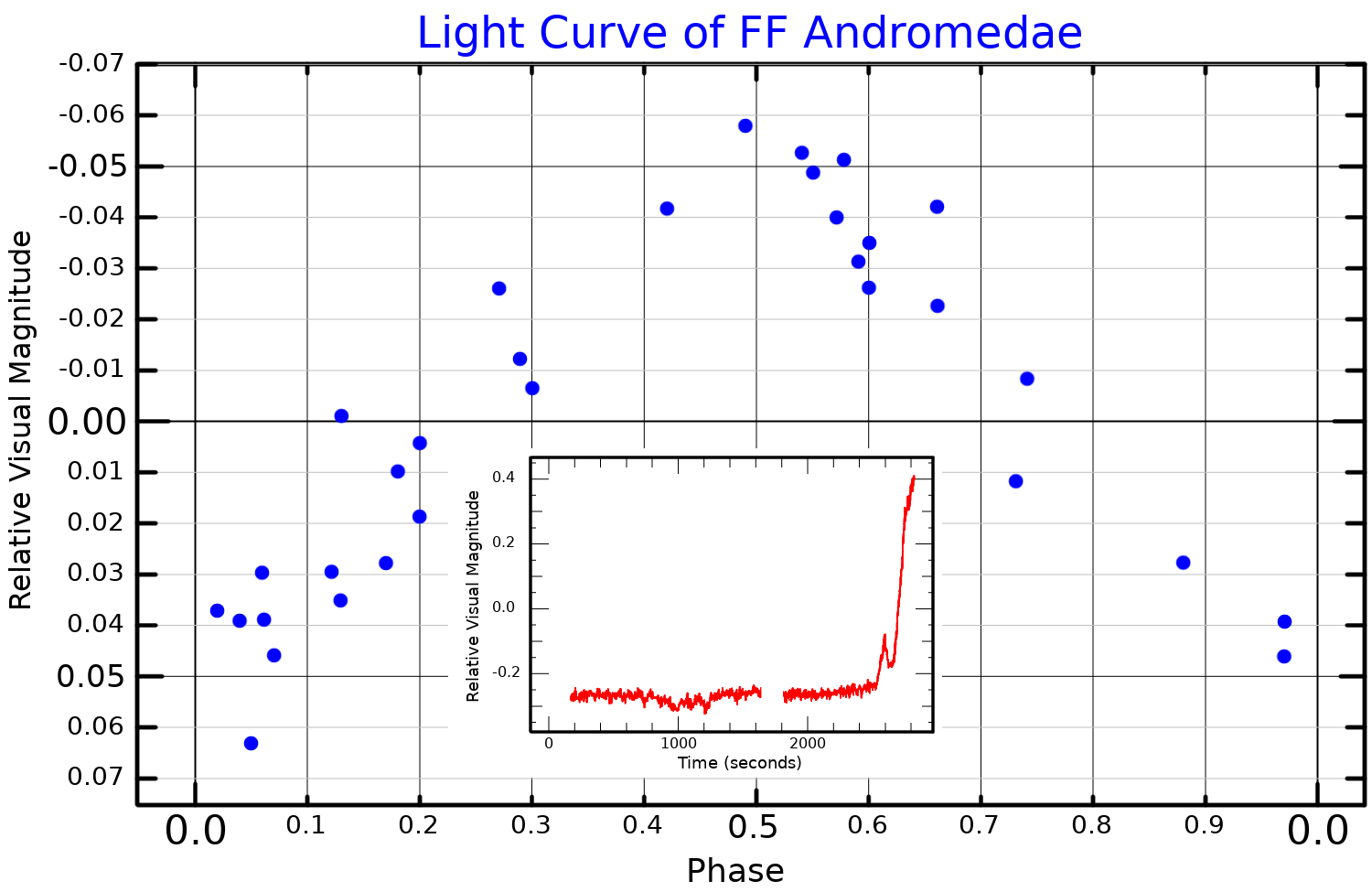
- Two light curves for FF Andromedae are shown. The main plot shows the variation in brightness as the star rotates, and the inset plot shows a flare that occurred on 18 October 1991. Adapted from plots in Bopp et al. 1977 and Peres et al. 1993.

Observation data Epoch J2000 Equinox ICRS
- Constellation: Andromeda
- Right ascension: 00^{h} 42^{m} 48.24949^{s}
- Declination: +35° 32′ 55.6580″
- Apparent magnitude (V): 10.428 variable

Characteristics
- Spectral type: M1Ve+M1Ve
- Apparent magnitude (B): 11.84
- Apparent magnitude (V): 10.428
- Apparent magnitude (R): 9.941
- Apparent magnitude (I): 8.8
- Apparent magnitude (G): 9.5526
- Apparent magnitude (J): 7.164
- Apparent magnitude (H): 6.506
- Apparent magnitude (K): 6.321
- Variable type: BY Dra + Flare

Astrometry
Radial velocity (R_{v})	−0.47±0.90 km/s
Proper motion (μ)	RA: 262.064±0.074 mas/yr Dec.: 77.062±0.109 mas/yr
Parallax (π)	46.0337±0.0542 mas
Distance	70.85 ± 0.08 ly (21.72 ± 0.03 pc)

Orbit
Period (P)	2.17 days
Inclination (i)	60°

Details

FF Andromedae A
Mass	0.55 M_{☉}
Radius	0.757 R_{☉}
Temperature	3,464 K
Metallicity [Fe/H]	+0.101 dex
Rotation	2.170 days
Rotational velocity (v sin i)	7.8 km/s

FF Andromedae B
Mass	0.55 M_{☉}
Radius	0.757 R_{☉}
Temperature	3,464 K
Metallicity [Fe/H]	+0.101 dex
Rotational velocity (v sin i)	6.6 km/s
Age	55 Myr

Other designations
- 2MASS J00424820+3532554, BD+34 106, HIP 3362, GJ 29.1, TYC 2283-26-1, NLTT 2314, WDS J00428+3533A

Database references
SIMBAD	data

FF Andromedae (often abbreviated to FF And) is a spectroscopic binary in the constellation Andromeda. It has a typical apparent visual magnitude of 10.4, but undergoes flare events that can increase its brightness by about a magnitude.

== System ==
Both stars in the FF Andromedae system are main sequence red dwarfs of spectral type M1Ve, meaning that the spectrum shows strong emission lines. The lines identified are H-alpha and Ca_{II}. They have a total mass of 1.10 M_{☉} and both are tidally locked, thus their rotation period is equal to the orbital period of 2.17 days.

The secondary component should not be confused with the 13th magnitude star listed in the Washington Double Star Catalog as WDS J00428+3533B and sometimes referred to as GJ 29.1B, which is just a line-of-sight giant star much more distant than FF Andromedae. The designation GJ 29.1B is also applied to the secondary red dwarf in the close spectroscopic binary.

== Variability ==
FF Andromedae shows a regular variability within a rotation period, typical of BY Draconis variable stars, but occasionally increases its brightness in a stellar flare. Small amplitude variations, at timescales of several minutes, were also reported during the quiescent phase. Small, but highly significant dips in the light curve have been detected approximately 25 minutes before a large flare.
