= HD 77191 =

Spectroscopic binary in the constellation Cancer

- Location of HD 77191 (circled)

Observation data Epoch J2000 Equinox ICRS
- Constellation: Cetus
- Right ascension: 09^{h} 01^{m} 22.77660^{s}
- Declination: +10° 43′ 58.5175″
- Apparent magnitude (V): 8.83 to 8.87

Characteristics
- Evolutionary stage: main sequence
- Spectral type: G0V + M
- B−V color index: +0.63
- J−H color index: +0.294
- J−K color index: +0.390
- Variable type: BY Draconis variable

Astrometry
Radial velocity (R_{v})	7.10±0.1 km/s
Proper motion (μ)	RA: −12.524 mas/yr Dec.: 4.156 mas/yr
Parallax (π)	16.4293±0.0623 mas
Distance	198.5 ± 0.8 ly (60.9 ± 0.2 pc)
Absolute magnitude (M_{V})	4.83±0.16

Orbit
Primary	HD 77191 A
Name	HD 77191 B
Period (P)	44.32±0.29 d
Semi-major axis (a)	(9.87±0.10)×10^{6} km (minimum)
Eccentricity (e)	0.315±0.008
Inclination (i)	105.1±3.5°
Periastron epoch (T)	53494.80±0.19
Argument of periastron (ω) (secondary)	297.5±2.2°

Details

HD 77191 A
Mass	1.01±0.02 M_{☉}
Radius	0.93±0.02 R_{☉}
Surface gravity (log g)	4.51±0.02 cgs
Temperature	5785±40 K
Metallicity [Fe/H]	−0.02±0.03 dex
Rotation	10.0±0.2 d
Rotational velocity (v sin i)	4.5±0.5 km/s
Age	1.46±1.26 Gyr

HD 77191 B
Mass	~0.38 M_{☉}

Other designations
- HL Cancri, AG+10°1163, BD+11°1961, HD 77191, HIP 44303, SAO 98298, PPM 126017, TIC 323492976, TYC 815-2116-1, GSC 00815-02116, 2MASS J09012277+1043585, Gaia DR3 603701328976020864

Database references
SIMBAD	HD 77191

HD 77191 is a spectroscopic binary composed of a Sun-like variable star and a probable red dwarf, located in the zodiac constellation of Cancer. It has the variable-star designation HL Cancri (abbreviated to HL Cnc). With an apparent magnitude of about 8.8, it is too faint to be seen by the naked eye but observable using binoculars as a yellow-hued dot of light. It is located at a distance of 198.5 light-years (60.9 parsecs) according to Gaia DR3 parallax measurements, and is receding from the Sun at a heliocentric radial velocity of 7.10 km/s.

The star is part of the Castor stream, a moving group of young stars that includes some of the brightest stars in the night sky, such as Castor, Fomalhaut, and Vega.

== Stellar properties ==
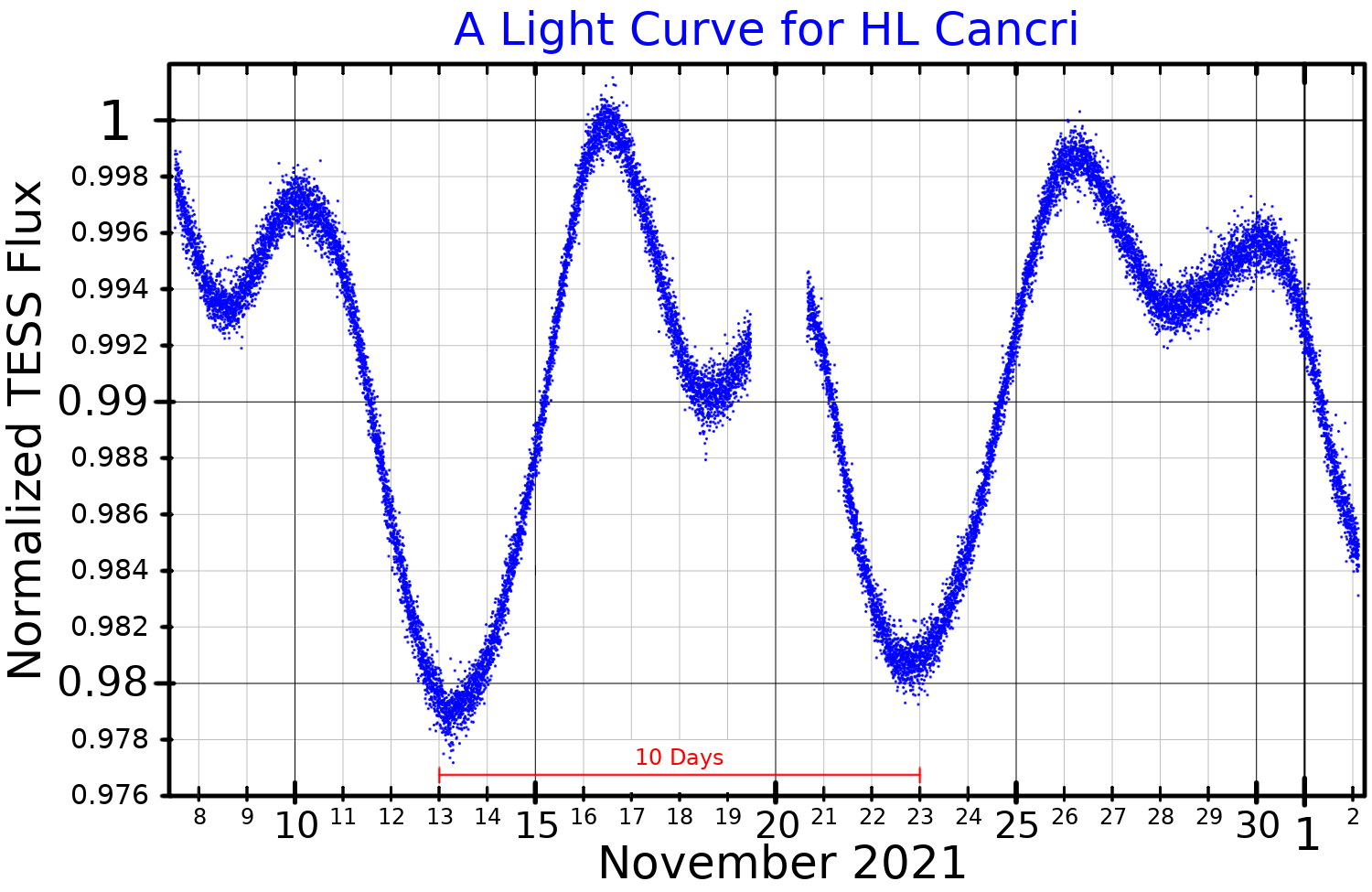
A light curve for HL Cancri, plotted from TESS data. The 10 day rotation period is marked in red.

The primary star is a G-type main-sequence star with the spectral type G0V, almost identical to the Sun in mass, effective temperature, and metallicity, but approximately 7% smaller in radius. Its spectrum shows clear signs of high stellar activity and a strong lithium doublet spectral line at wavelength 6707.8 Å, indicative of its youth, with an estimated age of 1.46±1.26 Gyr. Accordingly, the star displays large starspots, which are responsible for slight variations in its brightness, first discovered in 2000 with a mean amplitude of about 0.025 mag and a period of 10.0±0.2 d (which is also the star's rotation period). Hence, the star is classified as a BY Draconis variable.

Data collected by Hipparcos suggested that the star was single, but radial velocity observations via the Coravel spectrograph at the University of Cambridge yielded a 44-day period orbit for a binary companion. By matching the primary's rotational velocities measured through Doppler broadening and its photometric period, the mass of the unseen secondary star is placed at roughly 0.38 M_{☉}, making it likely a red dwarf.
