= GJ 3929 b =

Rocky exoplanet orbiting GJ 3929

- Artist's impressions of exoplanet GJ 3929 b around its host star

Discovery
- Discovered by: Kemmer et al.
- Discovery date: 2022
- Detection method: Transit

Designations
- Alternative names: Gliese 3929 b, TOI 2013 b, G 180-18 b

Orbital characteristics
- Semi-major axis: 0.0252±0.0005 AU
- Eccentricity: 0 (fixed)
- Orbital period (sidereal): 2.616 d
- Inclination: 88.442°±0.008°
- Star: GJ 3929

Physical characteristics
- Mean radius: 1.09±0.04 R_{🜨}
- Mass: 1.75+0.44 −0.45 M_{🜨}
- Mean density: 7.3±2.0 g/cm^{3}
- Temperature: 641±64 K (368 °C, dayside)

Atmosphere
- Composition by volume: None or oxygen-rich

GJ 3929 b (Gliese 3929 b, TOI-2013 b) is a confirmed exoplanet located 52 light-years away orbiting the red dwarf star GJ 3929. It is an Earth-sized planet, having a radius only 9% larger than that of Earth. It orbits its star at a distance of 0.0252 astronomical units (3,770,000 km), being located in the "Venus zone" of its star, and completes one orbit around it every 2 days and 15 hours. Because of the proximity of its star, GJ 3929 b has an equilibrium temperature of around 300 °C and receiving planetary insolation 17 times more intense than Earth receives from the Sun.

== Characteristics ==
=== Size, mass and density ===
Initially, the radius of GJ 3929 b was calculated at 1.15±0.04 R_{🜨}, and its mass at 1.21±0.42 M_{🜨}, giving a density of 4.4±1.6 g/cm^{3}. Later, observations using the NEID spectrometer on the WIYN 3.5 m Telescope measured the planet's mass to be 1.75±0.45 M_{🜨}; and observations using the ARCTIC imager, plus photometry from TESS and LCOGT, constrained the planet's radius to 1.09±0.04 R_{🜨}, this time giving a higher density of 7.3±2 g/cm^{3} (about 33% larger than Earth's (Note: The density of Earth is 5.513 g/cm³.)). The characteristics of this planet make it similar to Earth in terms of mass and radius.

=== Orbit ===
GJ 3929 b orbits its star at a distance of 0.0252 astronomical units (3,770,000 km), which makes it located in its host star's "Venus zone", a region where rocky planets might have runaway greenhouse conditions like Venus. GJ 3929 b completes an orbit around its star every 2 days, 14 hours and 47 minutes (2.616 days).

== Atmosphere and surface ==
The high density of GJ 3929 b does not suggest a dense atmosphere. Atmospheric scenarios such as a thin atmosphere of volatiles, a thin atmosphere of silicate enriched in refractory elements, or even no atmosphere at all are plausible. Due to its proximity to its host star, GJ 3929 b has probably already lost much of its atmosphere since its formation.

GJ 3929 b has been studied with the James Webb Space Telescope (JWST) in the search for an atmosphere. The search yield no detected molecular features, which rule out certain compositions such as a thick atmosphere rich in carbon dioxide (CO_{2}). The observations also measured the dayside temperature, which is consistent with that of a zero-albedo planet with no heat distribution, and indicates that GJ 3929 b is likely a bare rock. On the other hand, according to a 2026 study which also made use of JWST, the dayside temperature of GJ 3929 b is consistent with both airless and thin-atmosphere scenarios (such as an oxygen-rich, CO_{2}-poor atmosphere).

If GJ 3929 b is an airless planet, its surface is most likely covered with either crushed dunite rock or slab-form granite rock, based on secondary eclipse observations.

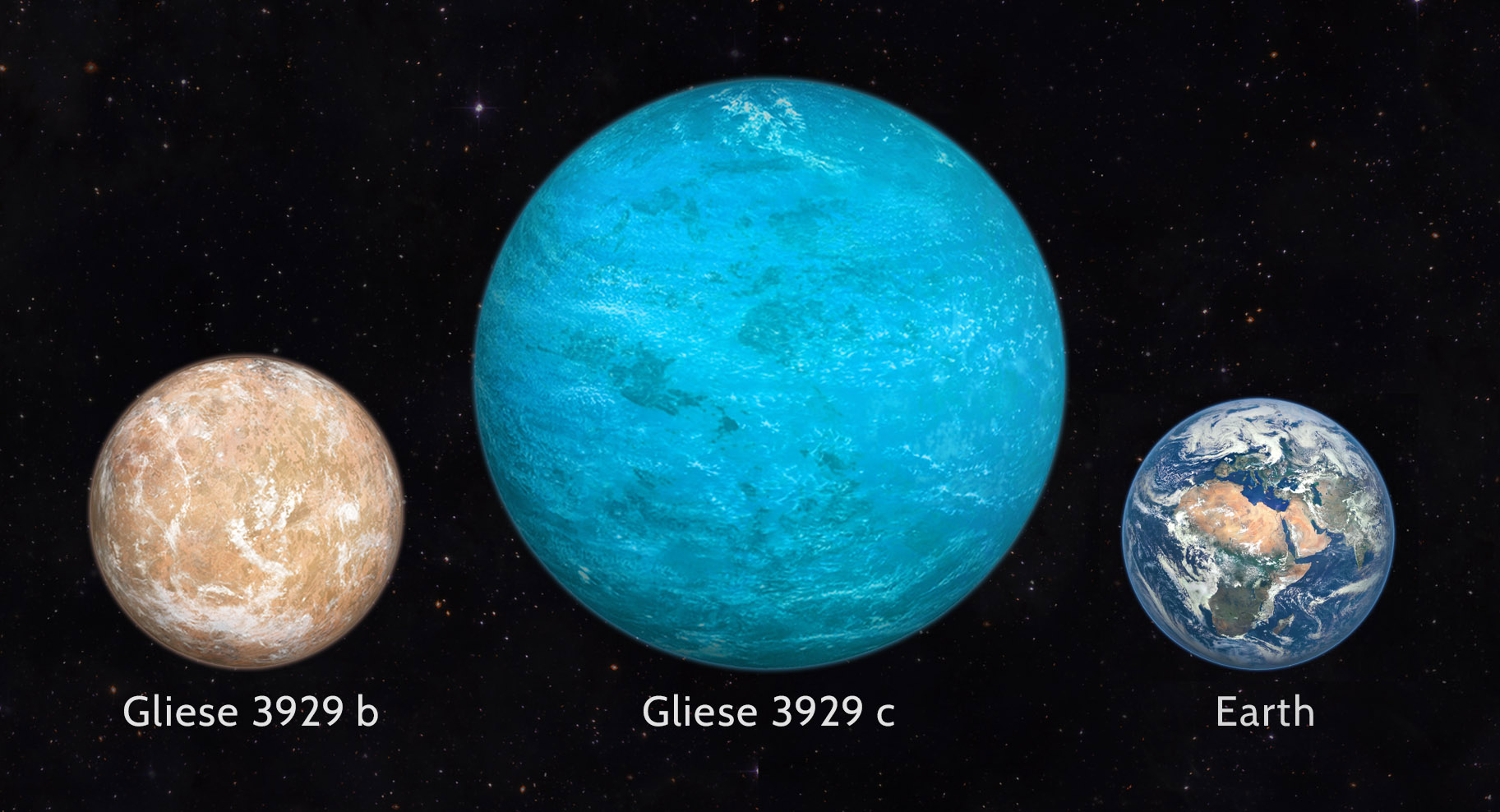
Artist's impression and size comparison of the two planets in the GJ 3929 system with Earth

== Discovery ==
GJ 3929 b was discovered by a team of astronomers led by Jonas Kermer, from the Heidelberg University in Germany. They reported a transit signal identified in the host star (GJ 3929)'s light curve detected by NASA's Transiting Exoplanet Survey Satellite (TESS). Afterwards, the planetary nature of this transit signal was confirmed using radial velocity observations with the CARMENES spectrograph, in addition to transit observations made with SAINT-EX and LCOGT. The discovery was announced in 2022.

The radial velocity observation with CARMENES also helped discover another planet in the planetary system, GJ 3929 c, a sub-Neptune detected by radial velocity.

== Host star ==
GJ 3929 is a red dwarf of spectral type M3.5V that is located 51.6 light years from Earth, in the constellation Corona Borealis. (Note: Obtained with a right ascension of 15^{h} 58^{m} 18.8^{s} and a declination of +35° 24′ 24.3″ on this website.) This star is smaller, cooler and less luminous than the Sun, having a radius of 0.32 R_{☉}, an effective temperature of 3,384 K (3,111 °C) and a luminosity equivalent to 1% of solar luminosity. Its age is estimated between 2.2 and 11 billion years.

The star also hosts another planet, called GJ 3929 c, a sub-Neptune orbits 3 times further than the innermost planet, at a distance of 0.081 astronomical units (12,100,000 km), but still below the habitable zone.
