= HD 178911 Bb =

Exoplanet orbiting HD 178911 B

Discovery
- Discovered by: Zucker et al.
- Discovery date: April 4, 2001
- Detection method: Radial velocity (Echelle)

Orbital characteristics
- Apastron: 0.393 AU (58,800,000 km)
- Periastron: 0.297 AU (44,400,000 km)
- Semi-major axis: 0.345 AU (51,600,000 km)
- Eccentricity: 0.139 ± 0.14
- Orbital period (sidereal): 71.511 ± 0.011 d 0.19578 y
- Average orbital speed: 52.7
- Time of periastron: 2,451,378.23 ± 83
- Argument of periastron: 172.3 ± 5
- Semi-amplitude: 346.9 ± 4.2
- Star: HD 178911 B

HD 178911 Bb is a planet discovered in 2001 by Zucker who used the radial velocity method. The minimum mass of this giant planet is 7.35 times that of Jupiter that orbits close to the star. The period of the planet is 71.5 days and the semi-amplitude is 346.9 m/s.
