= GJ 3929 =

Red dwarf star in the constellation Corona Borealis

Observation data Epoch J2000 Equinox ICRS
- Constellation: Corona Borealis
- Right ascension: 15^{h} 58^{m} 18.80^{s}
- Declination: +35° 24′ 24.3″
- Apparent magnitude (V): 12.67

Characteristics
- Evolutionary stage: main sequence
- Spectral type: M3.5V

Astrometry
Radial velocity (R_{v})	10.14 km/s
Proper motion (μ)	RA: −143.059 mas/yr Dec.: +318.120 mas/yr
Parallax (π)	63.1727±0.0208 mas
Distance	51.63 ± 0.02 ly (15.830 ± 0.005 pc)
Absolute magnitude (M_{V})	11.7

Details
Mass	0.313+0.027 −0.022 M_{☉}
Radius	0.32±0.01 R_{☉}
Luminosity	0.0109+0.0005 −0.0004 L_{☉}
Surface gravity (log g)	4.89±0.05 cgs
Temperature	3,384±88 K
Metallicity [Fe/H]	−0.02±0.12 dex
Rotation	122±13 d
Rotational velocity (v sin i)	<2 km/s
Age	7.1+4.1 −4.9 Gyr

Other designations
- G 180-18, TOI-2013, TIC 188589164, 2MASS J15581883+3524236, Gaia DR3 1372215976327300480

Database references
SIMBAD	data
Exoplanet Archive	data
ARICNS	data

GJ 3929, also known as Gliese 3929 and TOI-2013, is a red dwarf star located 51.6 light-years (18.6 parsecs) from Earth, in the constellation Corona Borealis. With an apparent magnitude of 12, it is not visible to the naked eye. In 2022, two exoplanets were detected orbiting the star.

== Characteristics ==
GJ 3929 is a red dwarf of spectral type M3.5V, having a radius of 0.32±0.01 R_{☉}, a mass of 0.313+0.027
−0.022 M_{☉} and a temperature of 3384±88 K. With an apparent magnitude of 12.7, it cannot be seen with the naked eye or with a small telescope. It has no companion stars and its age is estimated at 7.1 billion years, give or take four or five billion.

The star is located in the northern hemisphere, approximately 50 light years from Earth, in the direction of the constellation Corona Borealis. Its closest neighbor is the red dwarf G 179–57, located at a distance of 3.9 light years.

Nearest stars to GJ 3929
Name	Distance (light-years)
G 179-57	3.9
LP 224-38	5.2
Ross 640	5.6
Rho Coronae Borealis	5.9
Gliese 611	5.9

== Planetary system ==
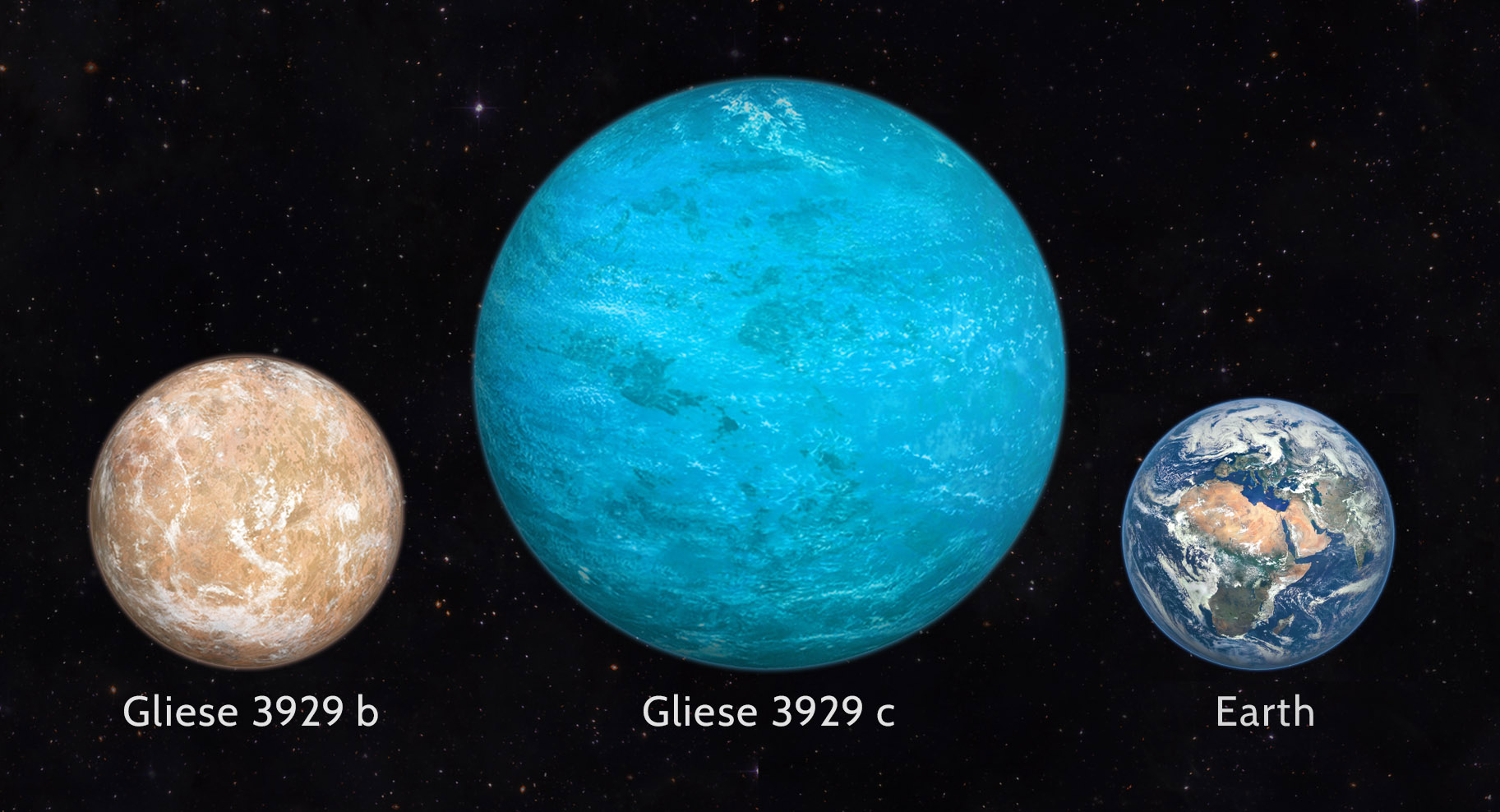
Artist's impression and size comparison of the two planets in the GJ 3929 system with Earth

In 2022, two exoplanets were detected orbiting around GJ 3929. The innermost, GJ 3929 b, is a rocky planet just 9% larger than Earth, while the outermost, GJ 3929 c, is a sub-Neptune with 5.7 times the mass of Earth. An additional planet candidate was discovered from follow-up radial velocity analysis in 2025 The three planets orbit inside (ie. hotter than) the star's habitable zone.

The GJ 3929 planetary system
Companion (in order from star)	Mass	Semimajor axis (AU)	Orbital period (days)	Eccentricity	Inclination (°)	Radius
b	1.75±0.45 M_{🜨}	0.0252±0.0005	2.616	0 (fixed)	88.442°±0.008	1.09±0.04 R_{🜨}
d (unconfirmed)	>1.37±0.15 M_{🜨}	0.0442±0.0007	6.116±0.004	0 (fixed)	—	—
c	>5.71±0.94 M_{🜨}	0.081±0.002	15.04±0.03	0 (fixed)	—	—

=== GJ 3929 b ===
The innermost planet, GJ 3929 b (TOI-2013 b), is an Earth-sized planet discovered by the transit method. Orbiting its star at a distance of 0.0252 astronomical units (3,770,000 km), the planet is located in its star's Venus zone, and completes a revolution every 2 days and 15 hours. The planet's equilibrium temperature is calculated at 568 K (295 °C), and it receives a planetary insolation 17 times greater than what the Earth receives from the Sun.

The planet's mass is calculated at 1.75±0.45 M_{🜨} according to photometric observations using the NEID spectrometer. Observations using the ARCTIC imager, plus photometry from TESS and LCOGT, constrained the planet's radius to 1.09±0.04 R_{🜨}. This radius makes GJ 3929 b very similar to Earth in terms of size.

It was discovered by a team of astronomers led by Jonas Kemmer. They reported a planetary transit signal in the host star's light curve. Subsequent observations, mainly with the CARMENES spectrograph, revealed that this transit signal is an orbiting exoplanet.

Due to the apparent brightness of the host star and its small size, GJ 3929 b is an excellent planet for atmospheric study with the James Webb Space Telescope. Observations have found no detected molecular features, which rules out certain compositions such as a thick atmosphere rich in carbon dioxide. The observations also measured the dayside temperature, which is consistent with that of a zero-albedo planet with no heat distribution, and indicate that GJ 3929 b is likely bare rock.

=== GJ 3929 c ===
The outermost planet, GJ 3929 c (TOI-2013 c) is a sub-Neptune discovered using the Radial velocity method. It orbits its star at a distance of 0.081 astronomical units (12,100,000 km), 3 times further away than GJ 3929 b, but still below GJ 3929's habitable zone, completing an orbit every 15 days.

Its minimum mass is 5.71±0.94 M_{🜨}, while its radius is unknown. Estimates using mass-radius relationship derive a radius of 2.26 R_{🜨}. Its equilibrium temperature is calculated at 317 K (44 °C), and it receives a planetary insolation 68% greater than what the Earth receives from the Sun.

GJ 3929 c was first identified in radial velocity data, which indicated the existence of another planet besides GJ 3929 b. Initially, it was just an exoplanet candidate, but it was later confirmed by a team led by Corey Beard. Because its orbital period (15 days) is far from its star's rotation period (122 days), it is unlikely that the radial velocity signal is actually an artifact of its parent star's activity and rotation.

== See also ==
- Gliese 436
