= HD 283750 =

Star in the constellation Taurus

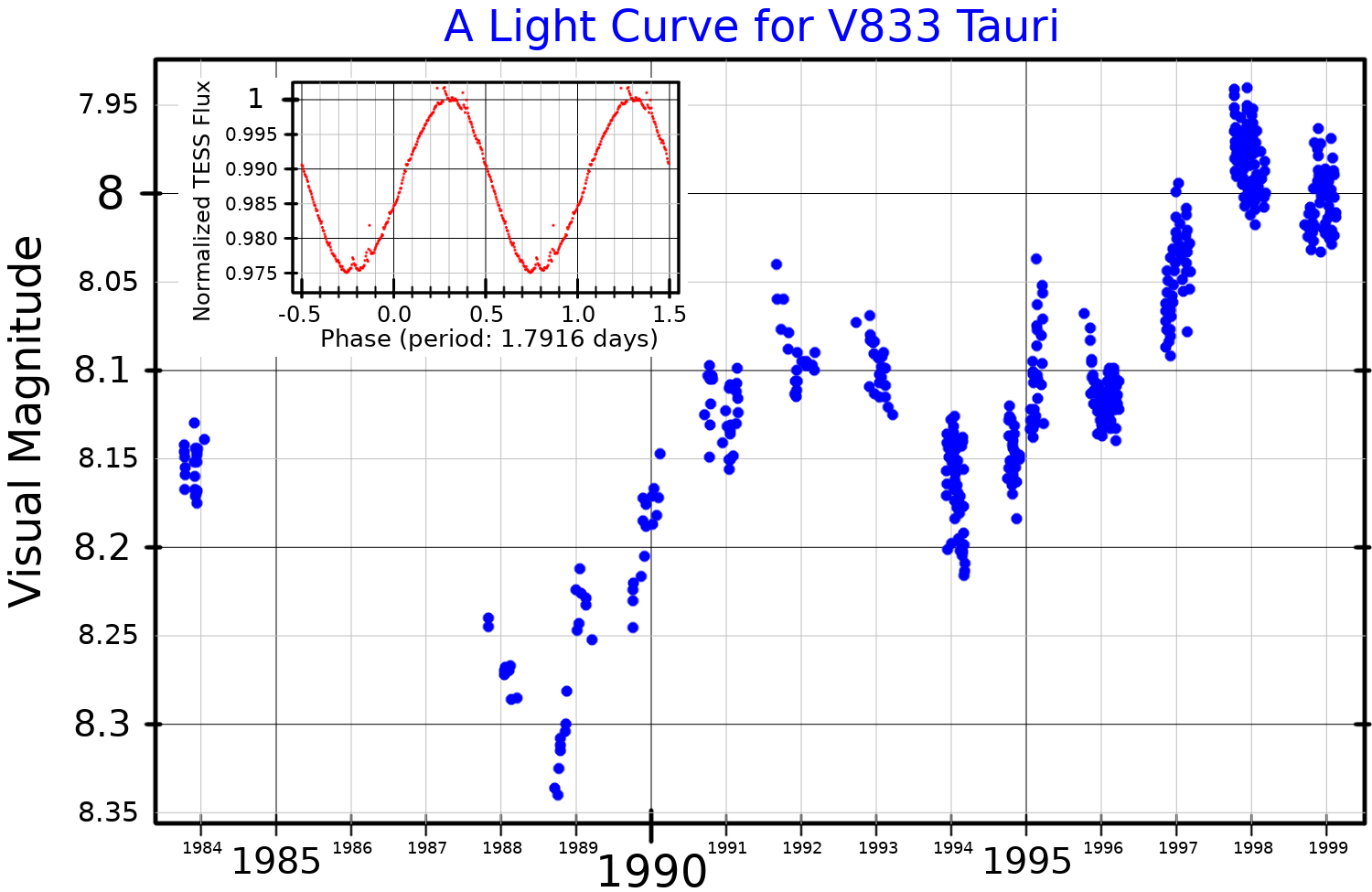
- A light curve for V833 Tauri. The main plot (adapted from Strassmeier et al. and Oláh et al.) shows the long term visual band variation, and the inset plot (plotted from TESS data) shows the periodic variability.

Observation data Epoch J2000 Equinox ICRS
- Constellation: Taurus
- Right ascension: 04^{h} 36^{m} 48.2422^{s}
- Declination: 27° 07′ 55.888″
- Apparent magnitude (V): 8.02 - 8.40

Characteristics
- Evolutionary stage: Main sequence
- Spectral type: K5Ve
- B−V color index: 1.12
- Variable type: BY Dra + Flare

Astrometry
Radial velocity (R_{v})	+42±3 km/s
Proper motion (μ)	RA: +232.17±0.06 mas/yr Dec.: −147.48±0.04 mas/yr
Parallax (π)	57.49±0.05 mas
Distance	56.73 ± 0.05 ly (17.39 ± 0.02 pc)

Details
Mass	0.8 M_{☉}
Radius	0.8 R_{☉}
Surface gravity (log g)	4.5 cgs
Temperature	4,250±100 K
Rotational velocity (v sin i)	7.4 km/s
Age	1 Gyr

Other designations
- V833 Tauri, BD+26°730, GJ 171.2, HIP 21482, TYC 1838-564-1, 2MASS J04364822+2707559, Gaia DR2 151650076838458112

Database references
SIMBAD	data

HD 283750, also known as V833 Tauri, is a K-type main-sequence star 57 light-years away from the Sun. The star is much younger than the Sun at 1 billion years. HD 283750 is similar to the Sun in its concentration of heavy elements.

The star has a co-moving white dwarf companion WD 0443+270 at a projected separation of 124″, both possibly ejected members of the Hyades cluster. The white dwarf companion has a rather exotic iron core and belongs to spectral class DA9 and has the mass of 0.62±0.02 M_{☉}.

In 1981, Lee William Hartmann et al. announced their discovery that the star, then known as BD+26°730, is a variable star. It was given its variable star designation, V833 Tauri, in 1985. Although HD 283750 was classified as a multi-period variable, a paper in 2020 claims its variability does not exceed the variability of the Sun, and no period can be identified.

HD 283750 is covered by a large amount of starspots, filling up to 28% of the stellar surface at the maxima of the magnetic cycle. In November 1993, the star emitted an extremely powerful flare with energy of 7.47×10^{34} ergs, which is on or even above the upper limit of possible energy releases in flare stars. The flares of HD 283750 are accompanied by particle beams strong enough to affect the polarization properties of the stellar photosphere.

== Suspected substellar companion ==
In 1996 a suspected 50-M_{J} brown dwarf HD 283750b on a 1.79-day orbit around HD 283750 was detected by the differential Doppler spectroscopy method. By 2007, the mass of the companion was refined to 0.19 M_{☉}, making it a red dwarf star.
