= HD 113538 b =

Extrasolar planet in the constellation Centaurus

Discovery
- Discovery date: 2010
- Detection method: Radial velocity

Orbital characteristics
- Semi-major axis: 0.71 ± 0.01 AU (106,200,000 ± 1,500,000 km)
- Eccentricity: 0.61 ± 0.11
- Orbital period (sidereal): 263.3 ± 2.3 d
- Star: HD 113538

HD 113538 b is an exoplanet approximately 51 light years away from Earth in the constellation Centaurus. It orbits its star (HD 113538) once every 263.3 days, placing it in the outer edge of the habitable zone. However it is most likely a gas giant with no solid surface.
