= HD 126053 =

Star in the constellation Virgo

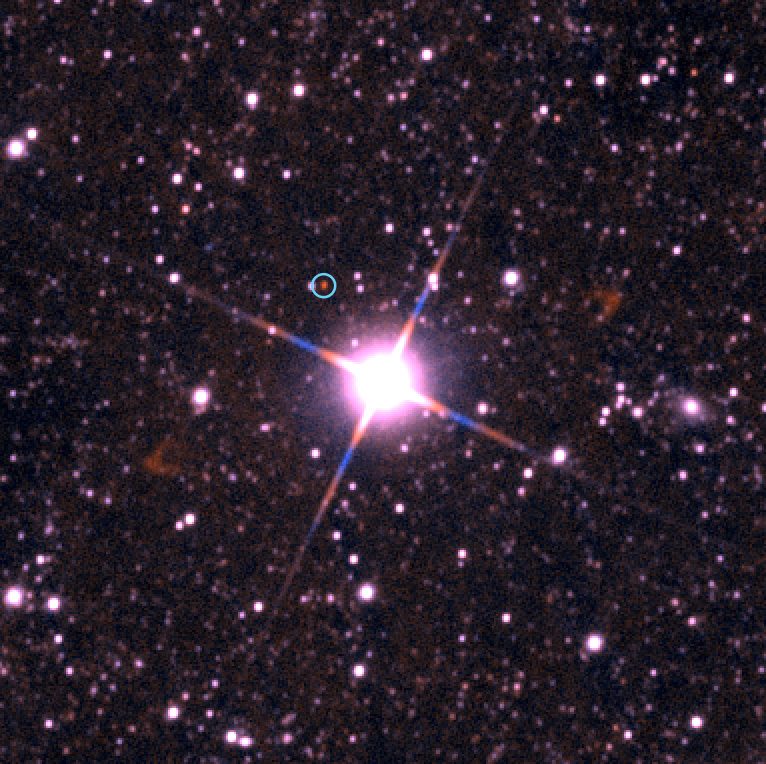
- HD 126053 and brown dwarf companion (blue circle); Credit: unWISE & Meli_thev

Observation data Epoch J2000.0 Equinox ICRS
- Constellation: Virgo
- Right ascension: 14^{h} 23^{m} 15.285^{s}
- Declination: +01° 14′ 29.64″
- Apparent magnitude (V): 6.25

Characteristics

HD 126053 A
- Evolutionary stage: Main sequence
- Spectral type: G1 V
- U−B color index: +0.09
- B−V color index: 0.639

HD 126053 B
- Evolutionary stage: Brown dwarf
- Spectral type: sdT7.5

Astrometry
Radial velocity (R_{v})	−19.17±0.06 km/s
Proper motion (μ)	RA: 223.531 mas/yr Dec.: −478.275 mas/yr
Parallax (π)	57.2706±0.0375 mas
Distance	56.95 ± 0.04 ly (17.46 ± 0.01 pc)
Absolute magnitude (M_{V})	+5.07

Details

HD 126053 A
Mass	0.89 M_{☉}
Radius	0.93 R_{☉}
Luminosity	0.83 L_{☉}
Luminosity (bolometric)	0.812 L_{☉}
Surface gravity (log g)	4.57 cgs
Temperature	5,722 K
Metallicity [Fe/H]	−0.28 dex
Rotation	22 d
Rotational velocity (v sin i)	3.08 km/s
Age	5.490 Gyr

HD 126053 B
Mass	0.019-0.047 M_{☉}
Radius	0.080-0.099 R_{☉}
Temperature	680±55 K
Metallicity	−0.35

Other designations
- BD+01°2920, GJ 547, HD 126053, HIP 70319, HR 5384, SAO 120424

Database references
SIMBAD	data

HD 126053 is the Henry Draper Catalogue designation for a star in the equatorial constellation of Virgo. It has an apparent magnitude of 6.25, which means it is faintly visible to the naked eye. According to the Bortle scale, it requires dark suburban or rural skies to view. Parallax measurements made by the Hipparcos spacecraft provide an estimated distance of 57 light years to this star. It is drifting closer with a heliocentric radial velocity of −19.2 km/s.

This star is considered a solar analog—meaning that it is photometrically analogous to the Sun. The physical properties of this star are similar to the Sun, although it is metal poor. Like the Sun, it has a magnetic activity cycle. It shares a common proper motion through space with the spectroscopic binary star system HD 122742, and in the past the three may have formed a triple star system. In the Bright Star Catalogue, it was noted as having an infrared excess. This may have been accreted from the HD 122742 system when the three stars were closer to each other.

In 2012, a brown dwarf was discovered orbiting this star at a distance of 2630 AU. This brown dwarf has a low temperature and is a T dwarf, with an estimated spectral type of T8p in the discovery paper. Discrepancies in the Y and K bands, likely due to low metallicity. Later the spectral types of low metallicity brown dwarfs, called subdwarfs, were revisited. This led to a re-classification of sdT7.5 and a metallicity of [M/H]= −0.35.

== Planetary system ==
In 2026, an 11-day period super-Earth was detected orbiting HD 126053 A using radial velocity method performed by the NEID spectrograph.

The HD 126053 planetary system
Companion (in order from star)	Mass	Semimajor axis (AU)	Orbital period (days)	Eccentricity	Inclination (°)	Radius
b	≥3.60±0.34 M_{🜨}	0.0933±0.0010	10.9145+0.0014 −0.0012	0.07+0.08 −0.05	—	—

== See also ==
- List of star systems within 55–60 light-years
