= LQ Hydrae =

Star in the constellation Hydra

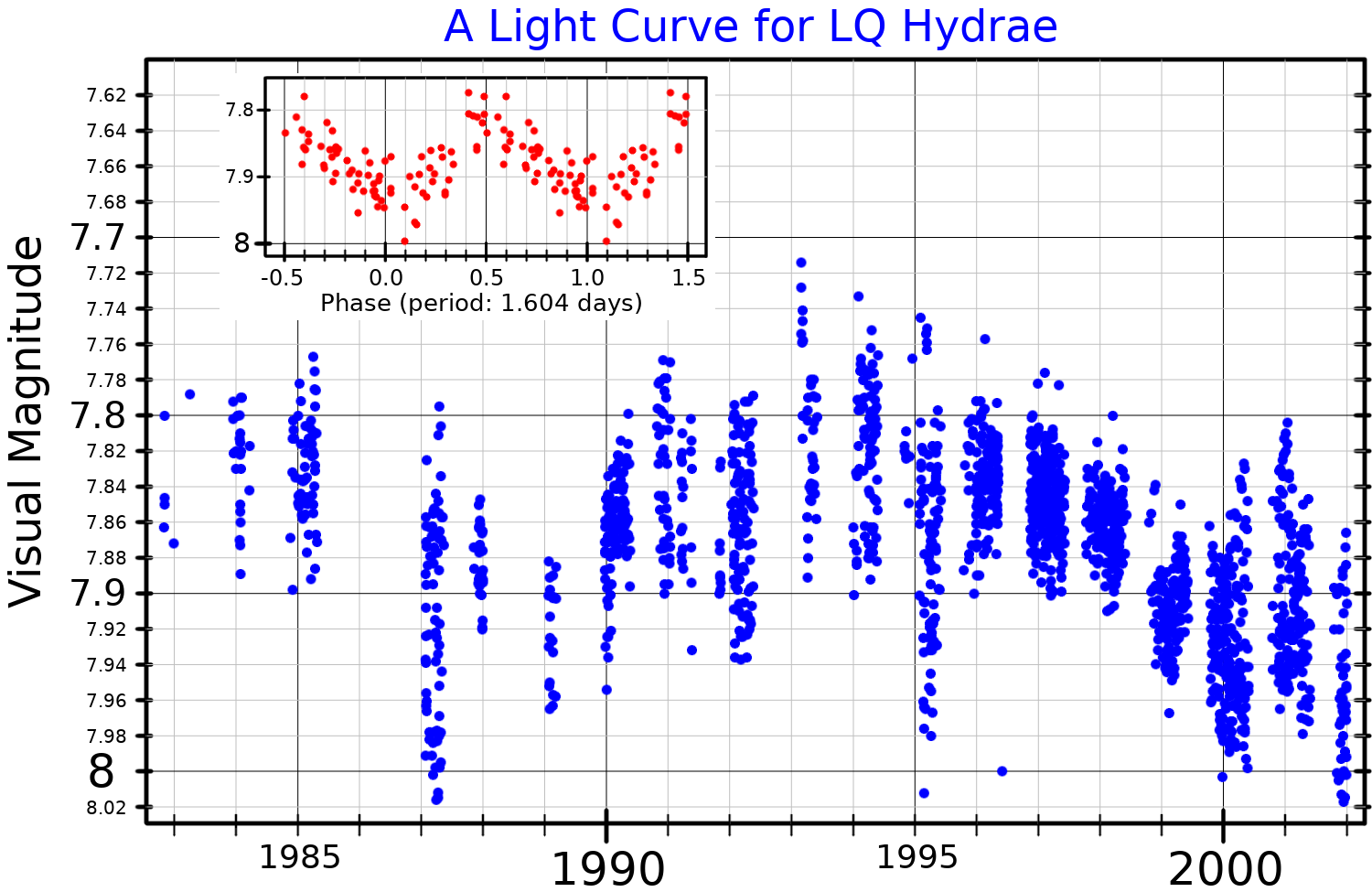
- A visual band light curve for LQ Hydrae. The main plot (adapted from Berdyugina et al.) shows the long-term variation, and the inset plot (adapted from Kiraga) shows the periodic variation.

Observation data Epoch J2000.0 Equinox J2000.0
- Constellation: Hydra
- Right ascension: 09^{h} 32^{m} 25.568^{s}
- Declination: −11° 11′ 04.69″
- Apparent magnitude (V): 7.79 to 7.86

Characteristics
- Evolutionary stage: Main sequence
- Spectral type: K1Vp
- B−V color index: 0.933±0.021
- Variable type: BY Dra

Astrometry
Radial velocity (R_{v})	7.58±0.27 km/s
Proper motion (μ)	RA: −248.040 mas/yr Dec.: 34.277 mas/yr
Parallax (π)	54.7362±0.0244 mas
Distance	59.59 ± 0.03 ly (18.269 ± 0.008 pc)
Absolute magnitude (M_{V})	6.47

Details
Mass	0.81 M_{☉}
Radius	1.0 R_{☉}
Luminosity	0.282±0.001 L_{☉}
Surface gravity (log g)	4.57 cgs
Temperature	4,812±39 K
Metallicity [Fe/H]	0.32 dex
Rotation	1.601 d
Rotational velocity (v sin i)	25±2 km/s
Age	Under 75 Myr

Other designations
- LQ Hya, BD−10 2857, GC 13168, GJ 355, HD 82558, HIP 46816, SAO 155272, LTT 3510

Database references
SIMBAD	data

LQ Hydrae is a single variable star in the equatorial constellation of Hydra. It is sometimes identified as Gl 355 from the Gliese Catalogue; LQ Hydrae is the variable star designation, which is abbreviated LQ Hya. The brightness of the star ranges from an apparent visual magnitude of 7.79 down to 7.86, which is too faint to be readily visible to the naked eye. Based on parallax measurements, this star is located at a distance of 59.6 light years from the Sun. It is drifting further away with a radial velocity of 7.6 km/s.

During a 1981 survey of southern stars, W. P. Bidelman found the H and K lines of ionized calcium for LQ Hya were filled in with emission. (W. D. Heintz independently made the same observation.) In 1986, F. C. Fekel and associates determined this is a young, rapidly rotating BY Draconis-type variable. A decade of photometry was used to determine a rotation period of 1.601136±0.000013 days (1 day, 14 hours, and 24 minutes) The star spots on the surface showed significant evolution over time scales of a few months. Variations in rotational modulation of surface activity suggested the star is undergoing differential rotation.

The high lithium abundance and rapid rotation of this star indicate it is a zero age main sequence star, or possibly even a pre-main sequence star. A strong flare event was observed on December 22, 1993, with an estimated energy release of ~5.7×10^{33} erg. Additional flares were detected thereafter, with ROSAT X-ray data from 1992 showing a strong flare during that time period. Observations from December 2000 and 2001 showed that the magnetic field of the star is dramatically changing its topology on a time frame of a year or less.

The stellar classification of LQ Hya is K1Vp, indicating it is a K-type main-sequence star with some peculiar features in the spectrum. In some respects it is considered an analog of a young Sun around the age of 60 million years. It shows strong emission of ultraviolet and has been detected in the X-ray band, showing an X-ray emission of 8.8×10^{29} erg/s and indicating high chromospheric activity levels. The star shows dual magnetic activity cycles with period of 6.8 and 11.4 years, which are somewhat comparable to the solar cycle in the Sun.
