= HD 178911 =

Triple star system in the constellation Lyra

- Location of HD 178911 (circled in red)

Observation data Epoch J2000.0 Equinox ICRS
- Constellation: Lyra
- Right ascension: 19^{h} 09^{m} 04.35193^{s}
- Declination: +34° 36′ 01.2420″
- Apparent magnitude (V): 6.70 (6.89 + 8.96 + 7.88)

Characteristics

HD 178911 Aa/Ab
- Evolutionary stage: Main sequence
- Spectral type: G1V + K1V
- B−V color index: 0.643±0.007

HD 178911 B
- Spectral type: G5V
- B−V color index: 0.750±0.015

Astrometry

HD 178911 Aa/Ab
Radial velocity (R_{v})	−38.09±1.01 km/s
Proper motion (μ)	RA: 76.618 mas/yr Dec.: 207.126 mas/yr
Parallax (π)	20.2306±0.3846 mas
Distance	161 ± 3 ly (49.4 ± 0.9 pc)
Absolute magnitude (M_{V})	3.28

HD 178911 B
Radial velocity (R_{v})	−40.324±0.0012 km/s
Proper motion (μ)	RA: 57.177 mas/yr Dec.: 195.900 mas/yr
Parallax (π)	24.3775±0.0274 mas
Distance	133.8 ± 0.2 ly (41.02 ± 0.05 pc)
Absolute magnitude (M_{V})	4.90

Orbit
Primary	HD 178911 Aa
Name	HD 178911 Ab
Period (P)	1,296.984±0.355 d
Semi-major axis (a)	0.074±0.002″
Eccentricity (e)	0.597±0.003
Inclination (i)	147.29±0.99°
Longitude of the node (Ω)	276.91±1.45°
Argument of periastron (ω) (secondary)	83.88±0.87°
Semi-amplitude (K_{1}) (primary)	6.47±0.09 km/s
Semi-amplitude (K_{2}) (secondary)	8.33±0.18 km/s

Details

HD 178911 Aa
Mass	0.802±0.055 M_{☉} 1.234±0.027 M_{☉}

HD 178911 Ab
Mass	0.622±0.053 M_{☉} 0.942±0.021 M_{☉}

HD 178911 B
Mass	1.03±0.02 M_{☉}
Radius	1.05±0.02 R_{☉}
Luminosity	1.00±0.02 L_{☉}
Surface gravity (log g)	4.40±0.02 cgs
Temperature	5,642±29 K
Metallicity [Fe/H]	0.23 dex
Rotational velocity (v sin i)	4.6 km/s
Age	4.8±1.3 Gyr

Other designations
- STF2747, HD 178911, HR 7272, WDS 19091+3436
- HD 178911 A: BD+34 3439, HIP 94076, SAO 67879, PPM 82386, LTT 15608, NLTT 47474
- HD 178911 B: BD+34 3438, HIP 94075, SAO 67875, PPM 82385, LTT 15608, NLTT 47473

Database references
SIMBAD	data
Exoplanet Archive	data

HD 178911 is a triple star system with an exoplanetary companion in the northern constellation of Lyra. With a combined apparent visual magnitude of 6.70, it is a challenge to view with the naked eye. The system is located at a distance of approximately 161 light years from the Sun based on parallax measurements, but is drifting closer with a radial velocity of −38 km/s.

== Stellar system ==
A companion star, designated component B, was first reported by F. G. W. Struve in 1823. As of 2019, the two have an angular separation of 16.0″ along a position angle of 263°. Component B shares a common motion through space with the primary, and thus they form a wide binary. This secondary is a magnitude 7.88 G-type main-sequence star with a stellar classification of G5V. The physical properties of this star are similar to the Sun, although it has a higher metallicity.

In 1985, the primary was determined to be a spectroscopic binary pair using the CHARA speckle interferometry program. Designated components Aa and Ab, these have an orbital period of 3.55 yr and an eccentricity (ovalness) of 0.6. They are magnitude 6.89 and 8.96. Based on based on a combined class of G5V for the pair, they have derived main sequence stellar classifications of G1V and K1V, respectively. C. D. Farrington and associates (2014) found dynamic masses for the components of 0.80 and 0.62, respectively. However, based on the classes, the expected masses should be around 1.0 and 0.8. Manuel Andrade (2019) derived higher dynamic masses of 1.20 and 0.94.

An additional companion HD 178911 C is a chance optical alignment and is not part of the system.

== Planetary system ==
In 2001 an extrasolar planet was discovered in orbit around HD 178911 B.

The HD 178911 B planetary system
Companion (in order from star)	Mass	Semimajor axis (AU)	Orbital period (days)	Eccentricity	Inclination (°)	Radius
b	>7.35 ± 0.60 M_{J}	0.345 ± 0.20	71.511 ± 0.011	0.139 ± 0.014	—	—

== See also ==
- List of extrasolar planets
