= HD 113538 =

Star in the constellation Centaurus

Observation data Epoch J2000.0 Equinox ICRS
- Constellation: Centaurus
- Right ascension: 13^{h} 04^{m} 57.47645^{s}
- Declination: −52° 26′ 34.5284″
- Apparent magnitude (V): 9.05

Characteristics
- Evolutionary stage: main sequence
- Spectral type: K9Vk:
- B−V color index: 1.362±0.009

Astrometry
Radial velocity (R_{v})	39.23±0.012 km/s
Proper motion (μ)	RA: −786.038 mas/yr Dec.: −795.591 mas/yr
Parallax (π)	61.3899±0.0523 mas
Distance	53.13 ± 0.05 ly (16.29 ± 0.01 pc)
Absolute magnitude (M_{V})	8.03

Details
Mass	0.585±0.05 M_{☉}
Radius	0.53±0.02 R_{☉}
Luminosity	0.127 L_{☉}
Surface gravity (log g)	3.79±0.53 cgs
Temperature	4,462±145 K
Metallicity [Fe/H]	−0.24±0.06 dex
Age	4.3±4.0 Gyr

Other designations
- CD−51 7244, GJ 9425, GJ 496.1, HD 113538, HIP 63833, LFT 966, LHS 344

Database references
SIMBAD	data

HD 113538 (Gliese 496.1) is a star with two planetary companions in the southern constellation of Centaurus. It is much too faint to be viewed with the naked eye at an apparent visual magnitude of 9.05. The distance to this star is 53 light years and it is drifting further away with a radial velocity of +39 km/s.

This is a K-type main-sequence star of a late spectral type, classified as K9Vk:. It displays chromospheric activity with a stellar cycle of at least four years and is metal poor. The star has 58.5% of the mass and 53% of the radius of the Sun. It is radiating just 12.7% of the luminosity of the Sun from its photosphere at an effective temperature of 4,462 K.

== Planetary system ==
Radial velocity variation of HD 113538 was inferred from observations with the HARPS spectrograph. The star is active (Log R'_{HK} −4.697, SMW 1.05), but the RV variation is not correlated with activity, indicating that planets are responsible. The data is fitted well by a solution including two planets, with an eccentric Saturn-mass planet and a more massive planet on a longer-period orbit—similar to the orbital architecture of the planetary system orbiting HD 163607, though with lower masses. Similar to HD 163607 b, the eccentricity and argument of periastron of HD 113538 b increases the planet's transit probability substantially more than it would be on a circular orbit.

The HD 113538 planetary system
Companion (in order from star)	Mass	Semimajor axis (AU)	Orbital period (days)	Eccentricity	Inclination (°)	Radius
b	≥ 0.36±0.04 M_{J}	1.24±0.04	663.2+8.4 −7.4	0.14±0.08	—	—
c	≥ 0.93±0.06 M_{J}	2.44±0.07	1,818+25 −22	0.20±0.04	—	—
