= 104 Tauri =

G-type star in the constellation Taurus

- Location of 104 Tauri (circled in red)

Observation data Epoch J2000 Equinox ICRS
- Constellation: Taurus
- Right ascension: 05^{h} 07^{m} 27.00529^{s}
- Declination: +18° 38′ 42.1815″
- Apparent magnitude (V): 4.92

Characteristics
- Evolutionary stage: subgiant
- Spectral type: G4V
- B−V color index: 0.64

Astrometry
Radial velocity (R_{v})	+20.19 km/s
Proper motion (μ)	RA: +534.73 mas/yr Dec.: +17.93 mas/yr
Parallax (π)	64.79±0.33 mas
Distance	50.3 ± 0.3 ly (15.43 ± 0.08 pc)
Absolute magnitude (M_{V})	3.75±0.06

Details
Mass	1.00+0.03 −0.04 M_{☉}
Radius	1.63±0.06 R_{☉}
Luminosity	2.41 L_{☉}
Habitable zone inner limit	1.17 AU
Habitable zone outer limit	2.76 AU
Surface gravity (log g)	4.06 cgs
Temperature	5,717 K
Metallicity [Fe/H]	−0.22 dex
Rotational velocity (v sin i)	10.00 km/s
Age	10.15 Gyr

Other designations
- m Tau, 104 Tau, BD+18°779, GJ 188, HD 32923, HIP 23835, HR 1656, SAO 94332

Database references
SIMBAD	data

104 Tauri (104 Tau) is the Flamsteed designation for a star in the equatorial constellation of Taurus. It has an apparent magnitude of 4.92, which is bright enough to be seen with the naked eye. Based upon parallax measurements, this star is located about 50 light-years from the Sun. It is moving further from the Sun with a heliocentric radial velocity of +20 km/s.

This star has a stellar classification of G4 V, which suggests it is an ordinary G-type main-sequence star that is generating energy through hydrogen fusion at its stellar core. It is an estimated 10 billion years old and is spinning with a projected rotational velocity of 10 km/s. The star has about the same mass as the Sun, with 1.6 times the Sun's radius. It is radiating 2.4 times the Sun's luminosity from its photosphere at an effective temperature of 5,717 K.

104 Tauri appears to have a modest barium enrichment compared to iron. This may indicate that the star had accreted stellar wind of a companion star in the asymptotic giant branch, which has since evolved into a white dwarf.

The star displays convincing evidence for an infrared excess, suggesting the presence of a circumstellar debris disk of dust. It also presents a statistically significant difference on proper motion measurements taken by the Hipparcos and Gaia spacecraft, suggesting the presence of an orbiting exoplanet.

On 24 July 2028, it will be occulted by Venus over Japan, East Siberia and the Pacific Ocean.
