= GJ 3685 =

Star in the constellation Leo

Observation data Epoch J2000 Equinox ICRS
- Constellation: Leo
- Right ascension: 11^{h} 47^{m} 40.74723^{s}
- Declination: +00° 15′ 20.1018″
- Apparent magnitude (V): 13.34

Characteristics
- Spectral type: M4V
- V−R color index: +1.22
- R−I color index: +1.55
- Variable type: Flare star

Astrometry
Radial velocity (R_{v})	7.02±0.32 km/s
Proper motion (μ)	RA: −314.284 mas/yr Dec.: −100.757 mas/yr
Parallax (π)	53.1361±0.0304 mas
Distance	61.38 ± 0.04 ly (18.82 ± 0.01 pc)

Details
Surface gravity (log g)	4.5 cgs
Temperature	3100 K
Metallicity	0.23
Rotational velocity (v sin i)	5.60±1.40 km/s

Other designations
- LP 613-49, LTT 13239, G 10-49, G 11-21

Database references
SIMBAD	data
ARICNS	data

GJ 3685 is a star in the constellation of Leo. It is extremely faint; its apparent magnitude is 13.3, and can only be seen with a ten-inch (25 cm) telescope (see Limiting magnitude). Based on a parallax of 53.1361 milliarcseconds, the system is located 61.4 light-years (18.8 parsecs) away from the Earth.

This is a part of a binary star system consisting of two components separated by 24″. The primary component, GJ 3685 (also known as GJ 3685 A), is a very old red dwarf that is also a flare star. A 20-minute flare was observed in 2004 by the GALEX satellite. Its companion, GJ 3686, is another faint red dwarf with a spectral type of M5. It is also known as LP 613-50 and is also located roughly the same distance as its primary.
