= BY Draconis =

Star in the constellation Draco

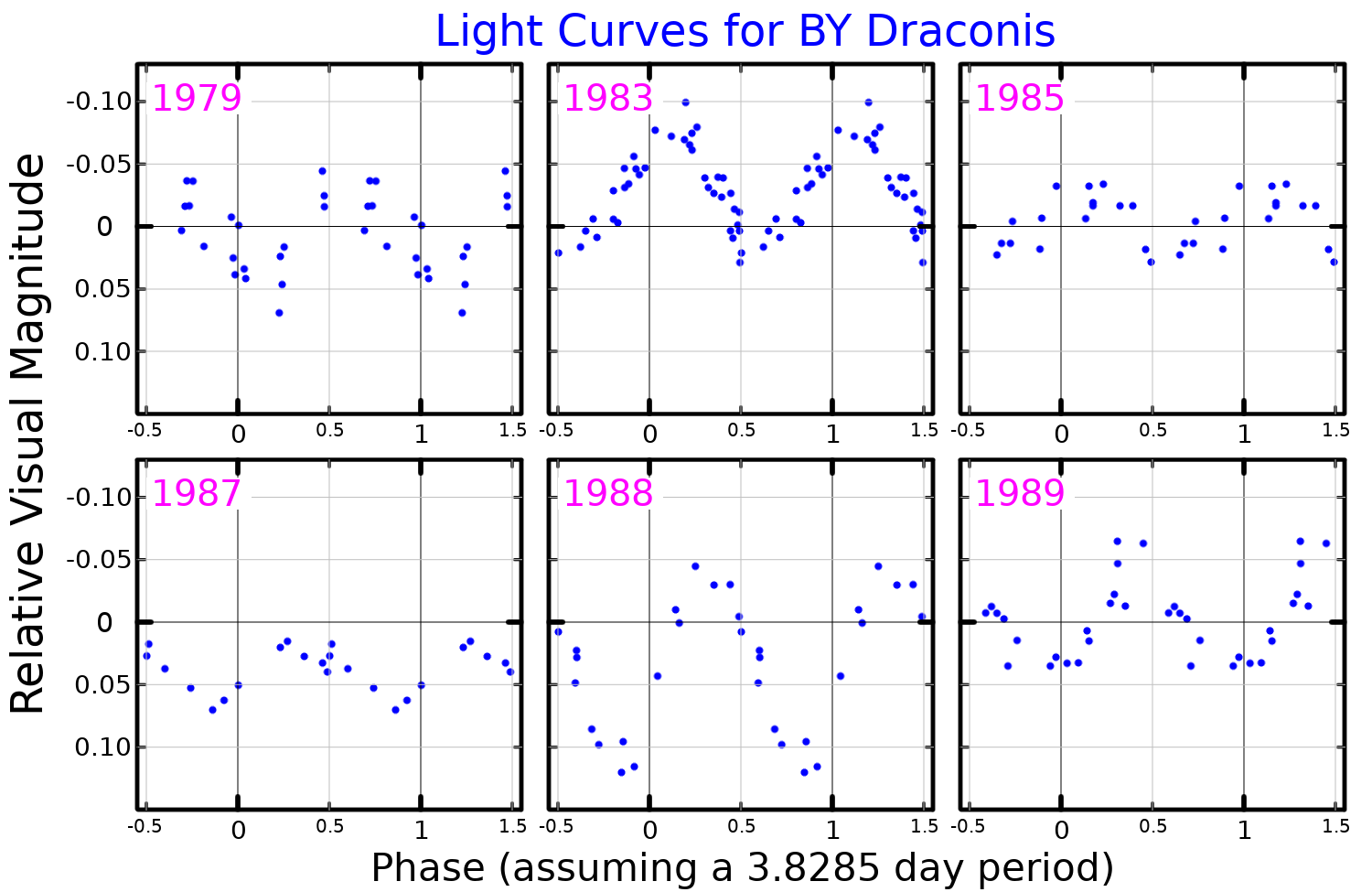
- Visual band light curves for BY Draconis from six different years, adapted from Pettersen et al. (1992)

Observation data Epoch J2000 Equinox ICRS
- Constellation: Draco
- AB
- Right ascension: 18^{h} 33^{m} 55.7721^{s}
- Declination: +51° 43′ 08.898″
- Apparent magnitude (V): 8.20

Characteristics
- Spectral type: K4Ve + K7.5Ve + M5
- U−B color index: +0.99
- B−V color index: +1.19
- Variable type: BY Dra + UV Cet

Astrometry

AB
Radial velocity (R_{v})	−25.484±0.046 km/s
Proper motion (μ)	RA: +185.715 mas/yr Dec.: −325.475 mas/yr
Parallax (π)	60.3814±0.0352 mas
Distance	54.02 ± 0.03 ly (16.561 ± 0.010 pc)
Absolute magnitude (M_{V})	7.48 / 8.63

Orbit
Primary	BY Dra A
Secondary	BY Dra B
Period (P)	5.9751139±0.0000046 d
Semi-major axis (a)	(4.4472±0.0091)×10^{−3}" (7.907±0.016 R_{☉})
Eccentricity (e)	0.30014±0.00062
Inclination (i)	154.41±0.29°
Longitude of the node (Ω)	152.3±0.1°
Periastron epoch (T)	JD 2453999.2144±0.0021
Argument of periastron (ω) (secondary)	230.33±0.17°
Semi-amplitude (K_{1}) (primary)	28.394±0.060 km/s
Semi-amplitude (K_{2}) (secondary)	32.284±0.061 km/s

Details

BY Dra A
Mass	0.792±0.026 M_{☉}
Radius	0.695±0.025 R_{☉}
Temperature	4,000 K
Metallicity	+0.0
Rotation	3.8285 days
Age	1–2 Gyr

BY Dra B
Mass	0.697±0.023 M_{☉}
Radius	0.61±0.02 R_{☉}
Temperature	4,000 K
Metallicity	+0.0
Rotation	3.8285 days
Age	1–2 Gyr

Other designations
- BY Dra, BD+51 2402, GJ 719, HD 234677, HIP 91009, SAO 31048, LTT 15477

Database references
SIMBAD	BY Dra AB
- BY Dra C
ARICNS	data

BY Draconis is a multiple star system in the constellation Draco, consisting of at least three main sequence stars. Components A and B form a close binary star system with a short orbital period of only 5.98 days. Their individual spectroscopic classifications are dK5e and dK7e. They form the prototype of a class of variable stars known as BY Draconis variables.

The third component (C) is widely separated from the A-B pair, by an angular distance of 17 arcseconds which corresponds to 260 AU at the estimated distance of this star system—where an AU is the average distance from the Earth to the Sun. Component C is an M5 class red dwarf star. There may be a fourth component to the system, orbiting with a ≤1000‑day period, responsible for the eccentricity of the 5.98-day orbit, but this has not been visually confirmed.

The variability of BY Draconis is caused by activity in the stellar photosphere called starspots, which are comparable to sunspots on the Sun but much larger on BY Dra, in combination with rapid rotation that changes the viewing angle of the activity relative to the observer. This variation has an average periodicity of 3.8285 days, but the brightness also changes over the course of several years—depending on the level of surface activity. Most observers believe that the primary star (A) is responsible for the variability as the secondary produces only a third of the total luminosity from the system. However, spots may occur on both stars. Unlike the Sun, these spots may occur in the polar regions of the stars.
