= 9 Puppis =

Binary star system in the constellation Puppis

Observation data Epoch J2000.0 Equinox ICRS
- Constellation: Puppis
- Right ascension: 07^{h} 51^{m} 46.30295^{s}
- Declination: −13° 53′ 52.9169″
- Apparent magnitude (V): 5.16

Characteristics
- Spectral type: G0V (G1 + G9)
- B−V color index: 0.600±0.007

Astrometry
Radial velocity (R_{v})	−21.34±0.16 km/s
Proper motion (μ)	RA: −67.75 mas/yr Dec.: −346.66 mas/yr
Parallax (π)	60.59±0.59 mas
Distance	53.8 ± 0.5 ly (16.5 ± 0.2 pc)
Absolute magnitude (M_{V})	4.07 (4.65 + 5.30)

Orbit
Period (P)	22.7010 ± 0.0270 yr
Semi-major axis (a)	602.0±7.2 mas
Eccentricity (e)	0.741±0.007
Inclination (i)	80.4±0.21°
Longitude of the node (Ω)	102.9±0.27°
Periastron epoch (T)	1,985.92±0.021 Byr
Argument of periastron (ω) (secondary)	73.1±0.4°
Semi-amplitude (K_{1}) (primary)	9.12±0.63 km/s
Semi-amplitude (K_{2}) (secondary)	9.69±0.26 km/s

Details

A
Mass	1.061±0.002 M_{☉}
Radius	1.04 (Note: Calculated, using the Stefan-Boltzmann law and the star's effective temperature and luminosity, with respect to the solar nominal effective temperature of 5,772 K: $$\sqrt{\biggl(\frac{5,772}{6,025}\biggr)^4 \cdot 10^{0.11}} = 1.04\ R_\odot.$$) R_{☉}
Luminosity	1.29 L_{☉}
Temperature	6,025 K
Age	5.0 Gyr

B
Mass	0.900±0.002 M_{☉}
Radius	0.87 (Note: Calculated, using the Stefan-Boltzmann law and the star's effective temperature and luminosity, with respect to the solar nominal effective temperature of 5,772 K: $$\sqrt{\biggl(\frac{5,772}{5,620}\biggr)^4 \cdot 10^{-0.17}} = 0.87\ R_\odot.$$) R_{☉}
Luminosity	0.67 L_{☉}
Temperature	5,620 K
Age	3.8 Gyr

Other designations
- 9 Pup, BD−13° 2267, GC 10629, GJ 291, HD 64096, HIP 38382, HR 3064, SAO 153500, ADS 6420, WDS J07518-1354, BU 101, 2MASS J07514629-1353526

Database references
SIMBAD	data

9 Puppis is a binary star system in the southern constellation of Puppis. It was originally designated 9 Argus, being part of the now defunct constellation Argo Navis. The system is faintly visible to the naked eye as a point of light with a combined apparent visual magnitude of 5.16. The magnitude difference between the two stars is 0.65. Parallax measurements yield a distance estimate to 9 Puppis of approximately 54 light years from the Sun, with the dynamic and trigonometric parallaxes for the system being in close agreement. It is drifting closer with a systemic radial velocity of –21 km/s. The motion of the system through space is predicted to bring it as close as 42.2 light-years in about 292,000 years.

The binary nature of this system was discovered by S. W. Burnham in 1873, and it now has the discovery code BU 101 (originally: β 101). Early efforts at computing orbital elements were made by Burnham (1894), Aitken (1914), and others. The latest refined elements show an orbital period of 22.7 years with a large eccentricity (ovalness) of 0.74. The orbital plane is highly inclined to the line of sight at an angle of 80.4°.

The physical size of the system's semimajor axis is estimated to be 10 AU. The large eccentricity of their orbit means a circumstellar planetary orbit would most likely only be stable over long periods with a semimajor axis inside 0.67 AU from the primary and 0.63 AU from the secondary. An outer circumbinary planet would have a stable orbit with a semimajor axis beyond about 34.5 AU from the barycenter.

The stellar classification of the 9 Puppis system is G0V, matching a G-type main-sequence star like the Sun. The dynamic masses of the components are 1.06 and 0.90 times the mass of the Sun, yielding estimated individual stellar classes of G1 for the primary and G9 for the secondary, respectively. The system has been listed as a probable member of the Ursa Major Moving Group, but was excluded by Soderblom and Mayor (1993) due to low lithium abundance and low X-ray flux. Their age determined from chromospheric heating is around seven billion years.
