= Ross 640 =

White dwarf star in the northern constellation of Hercules

Observation data Epoch J2000.0 Equinox ICRS
- Constellation: Hercules
- Right ascension: 16^{h} 28^{m} 25.0031^{s}
- Declination: +36° 46′ 15.847″
- Apparent magnitude (V): 13.83

Characteristics
- Evolutionary stage: white dwarf
- Spectral type: DZA5.5

Astrometry
Proper motion (μ)	RA: −494.230(15) mas/yr Dec.: 746.698(18) mas/yr
Parallax (π)	62.9109±0.0143 mas
Distance	51.84 ± 0.01 ly (15.895 ± 0.004 pc)
Absolute magnitude (M_{V})	+13.01

Details
Mass	0.58±0.03 M_{☉}
Luminosity	0.0007 L_{☉}
Surface gravity (log g)	7.76 cgs
Temperature	8,100 K
Age	1.02 Gyr

Other designations
- GJ 626.2, GJ 9564, LTT 14906, WD 1626+368

Database references
SIMBAD	data

Ross 640 is a white dwarf star in the northern constellation of Hercules, positioned near the constellation border with Corona Borealis. With an apparent visual magnitude of 13.83, it is too faint to be visible to the naked eye. Its trigonometric parallax from the Gaia mission is 62.9″, corresponding to a distance of 52 light-years (15.9 parsecs).

This compact star has a stellar classification of DZA5.5, indicating a metal-rich atmosphere accompanied by weaker lines of hydrogen. A detailed analysis of its spectrum revealed that Ross 640 is a relatively cool white dwarf with an effective temperature of approximately 8,100 K, which means that it has been in the white dwarf phase for slightly more than 1 billion years. Ross 640 has a spectrum characterized by hydrogen Balmer lines in the visible and very strong ionized magnesium lines in the ultraviolet. The presence of heavy elements in the photosphere of Ross 640 indicates that it recently accreted rocky debris from its planetary system.
