= HD 53680, HD 53705, and HD 53706 =

Quadruple star system in the constellation Puppis

HD 53705 / 53706 / 53680
- Location of HD 53680, HD 53705, and HD 53706 (circled)

Observation data Epoch J2000.0 Equinox ICRS
- Constellation: Puppis
- HD 53705
- Right ascension: 07^{h} 03^{m} 57.315^{s}
- Declination: −43° 36′ 28.93″
- Apparent magnitude (V): 5.559±0.003
- HD 53706
- Right ascension: 07^{h} 03^{m} 58.921^{s}
- Declination: −43° 36′ 40.87″
- Apparent magnitude (V): 6.859±0.003
- HD 53680
- Right ascension: 07^{h} 03^{m} 50.214^{s}
- Declination: −43° 33′ 41.41″
- Apparent magnitude (V): 8.686

Characteristics

HD 53705
- Evolutionary stage: main sequence
- Spectral type: G1.5V
- B−V color index: 0.624±0.009

HD 53706
- Evolutionary stage: main sequence
- Spectral type: K0.5V
- B−V color index: 0.779±0.020

HD 53680
- Spectral type: K6V
- B−V color index: 1.180±0.012

Astrometry

HD 53705
Radial velocity (R_{v})	+88.81±0.12 km/s
Proper motion (μ)	RA: −105.047 mas/yr Dec.: +389.833 mas/yr
Parallax (π)	58.6192±0.0477 mas
Distance	55.64 ± 0.05 ly (17.06 ± 0.01 pc)
Absolute magnitude (M_{V})	+4.47

HD 53706
Radial velocity (R_{v})	+88.55±0.12 km/s
Proper motion (μ)	RA: −101.722 mas/yr Dec.: +382.507 mas/yr
Parallax (π)	58.6173±0.0126 mas
Distance	55.64 ± 0.01 ly (17.060 ± 0.004 pc)
Absolute magnitude (M_{V})	+5.99

HD 53680
Radial velocity (R_{v})	+89.065±0.005 km/s
Proper motion (μ)	RA: −91.391 mas/yr Dec.: +434.521 mas/yr
Parallax (π)	57.7938±0.3355 mas
Distance	56.4 ± 0.3 ly (17.3 ± 0.1 pc)
Absolute magnitude (M_{V})	7.81±0.03

Orbit
Primary	HD 53680 A
Name	HD 53680 B
Period (P)	1,685.2+0.37 −0.38 days
Semi-major axis (a)	2.53±0.02 AU
Eccentricity (e)	0.485±0.002
Inclination (i)	163.6+1.4 −1.7°
Longitude of the node (Ω)	147.86+0.06 −0.08°
Argument of periastron (ω) (secondary)	226.17+0.13 −0.17°
Semi-amplitude (K_{1}) (primary)	1.252+0.001 −0.002 km/s

Details

HD 53705
Mass	0.99+0.02 −0.01 M_{☉}
Radius	1.24±0.02 R_{☉}
Luminosity	1.52+0.07 −0.08 L_{☉}
Surface gravity (log g)	4.29±0.02 cgs
Temperature	5,826±8 K
Metallicity [Fe/H]	−0.230±0.006 dex
Rotational velocity (v sin i)	1.6±0.5 km/s
Age	9.29+0.25 −0.26 Gyr

HD 53706
Mass	0.818±0.040 M_{☉}
Radius	0.873±0.018 R_{☉}
Luminosity	0.499±0.007 L_{☉}
Surface gravity (log g)	4.461+0.011 −0.020 cgs
Temperature	5192+9 −22 K
Metallicity [Fe/H]	−0.28±0.03 dex
Rotational velocity (v sin i)	0.3±0.5 km/s
Age	11.7+3.3 −9.6 (weakly constrained) Gyr

HD 53680 A
Mass	0.71±0.04 M_{☉}
Radius	0.68±0.03 R_{☉}
Luminosity	0.17+0.04 −0.02 L_{☉}
Surface gravity (log g)	4.62±0.03 cgs
Temperature	4,460±100 K
Metallicity [Fe/H]	−0.29±0.08 dex
Rotational velocity (v sin i)	2.08±0.31 km/s
Age	0.7 - 9.4 (weakly constrained) Gyr

HD 53680 B
Mass	0.22±0.02 M_{☉}

Other designations
- WDS J07040−4337
- HD 53705: GJ 264.1 A, GJ 9223 A, HD 53705, HIP 34065, HR 2667, IRAS 07024−4332 A
- HD 53706: GJ 264.1 B, GJ 9223 B, HD 53706, HIP 34069, HR 2668, IRAS 07024−4332 B
- HD 53680: GJ 264, HD 53680, HIP 34052

Database references
SIMBAD	HD 53705
- HD 53706
- HD 53680

HD 53705/53706/53680 is a star system that lies 56 light-years away in the constellation of Puppis. The system consists of four stars in two binaries, making it one of the nearest quadruple star systems.

The four components are a main sequence star similar to the Sun, two smaller K-type main sequence stars, and a low-mass star.

== Component discovery ==
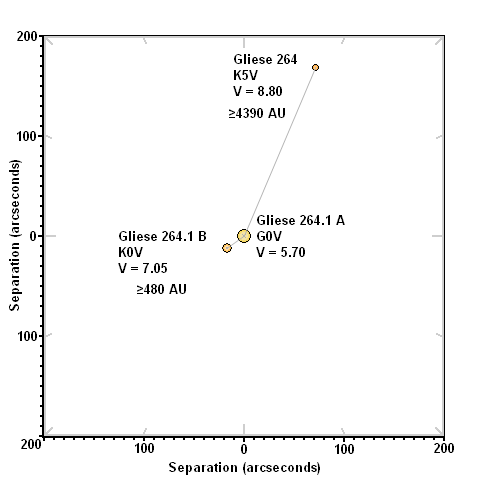
A diagram of HD 53706 (GJ 264.1 B) and HD 53680 (GJ 264), relative to HD 53705 (GJ 264.1 A)

The earliest observation of the HD 53705/HD 53706 pair in the Washington Double Star Catalog (WDS) dates to 1826 and was made by James Dunlop, stating a position angle of 119 degrees and a separation of 21.5 arcseconds for the companion. The two stars have moved very little relative to each other since, with the most recent measurement from 1999 stating a position angle of 126 degrees and a separation of 20.9 arcseconds. A separation of 21 arcseconds translates to a physical separation perpendicular to the line of sight of approximately 480 AU, so the orbit of the stars lasts somewhere on the order of millennia.

The relationship of HD 53680 to the closer binary was recognised later, with the first measurement in the WDS dating to 1900. With a position angle of 337 degrees and a separation of 185.7 arcseconds, HD 53680 lies on the opposite side of HD 53705 to HD 53706, and is about nine times more distant. This separation results in a physical separation perpendicular to the line of sight of 4390 AU, which is atypically distant for a stellar companion but still close enough to be strongly gravitationally bound.

While all three components have similar proper motion, HD 53680's proper motion as measured by the Hipparcos satellite is sizeably discrepant from the proper motions of the other two components. A clue to the cause of this is that HD 53680's Tycho-2 proper motion is different from the Hipparcos values, which indicates that the star is being perturbed by a close companion. A fit of the Hipparcos astrometric data found a weakly constrained fit found a period of 1500 days, an inclination of 180 degrees (a face-on orbit) and a semimajor axis of 30.6 milliarcseconds. The fit is weakly constrained because Hipparcos observations do not span the full orbit of the companion, but the fit does adjust HD 53680's proper motion to be consistent with the proper motion of HD 53705/53706.

The low inclination of HD 53680 B's orbit reduces the amplitude of the radial velocity variation that it caused on HD 53680 A. In this case, the effect reduced the minimum mass of the companion into the brown dwarf regime as deduced from observations with the CORALIE spectrograph. The spectroscopic orbit produces far stronger constraint compared to the astrometry-only orbit, and a mass of 0.22 M_{☉} is derived.

== Stellar properties ==
HD 53705, with a spectral type of G1.5V, is a G-type main-sequence star that is slightly hotter, larger and brighter than the Sun. HD 53706 and HD 53680 A are both K-type main-sequence stars, with spectral types of K0.5V and K6V, respectively. Both of these stars are substantially cooler, smaller and dimmer than the Sun.

The three stars with observed spectra in the system have similar metallicity values: [Fe/H] = −0.21±0.03 and −0.28±0.03 for HD 53705 and B, and [Fe/H] = −0.29±0.08 for HD 53680 A.

The sub-solar metallicity of the stars has the effect of heating up their chromospheres; Though HD 53705 has a mass that is approximately solar, its effective temperature is about fifty degrees hotter.

The kinematics of the stars, with large proper motion and radial velocity, suggests that the system is a member of the thick disk, the population of stars that comprise most of the older members of the Milky Way's spiral arms. This is supported by the parameters of HD 53705; the surface gravity of 4.34 is somewhat low for a G0V star, indicating that it is relatively old and moving towards the end of its main sequence lifetime - which, when coupled with the solar mass, mean that estimates for the star's age are approximately 9 billion years old, approximately twice the solar age. With a peculiar velocity of 75.7 km/s, The orbit of the system about the galaxy has an eccentricity of 0.31 and brings the system up to 151 parsecs away from the galactic plane - again indicative of a thick disk system.

== Planet searches ==
Being bright, solar-type and nearby, HD 53705 and B are targets for radial velocity (RV)-based planet searches.

HD 53705 was one of the 37 targets of the first RV-based planet search in the southern hemisphere, the ESO CES survey. This survey did not detect any companion with several Jovian masses out to a few AU. An extension of this survey to the HARPS spectrograph provides further constraint, suggesting that there are no Jupiter-mass companions out to about 5 AU.

HD 53705 can be presumed to be on the CORALIE sample, as it satisfies the criteria of parallax = ≥20 mas with error ≤5 mas, and spectral type between F8 and M1. HD 53706 fails the criteria due to the large error on its parallax, while HD 53680 satisfies them.

The two stars are also on the Anglo-Australian Telescope sample, which has found that they are stable to 4.5 and 2.9 m/s, respectively. This excludes the presence of giant planets at separations of a few AU around either star.
