= BY Draconis variable =

Variable stars of late spectral types

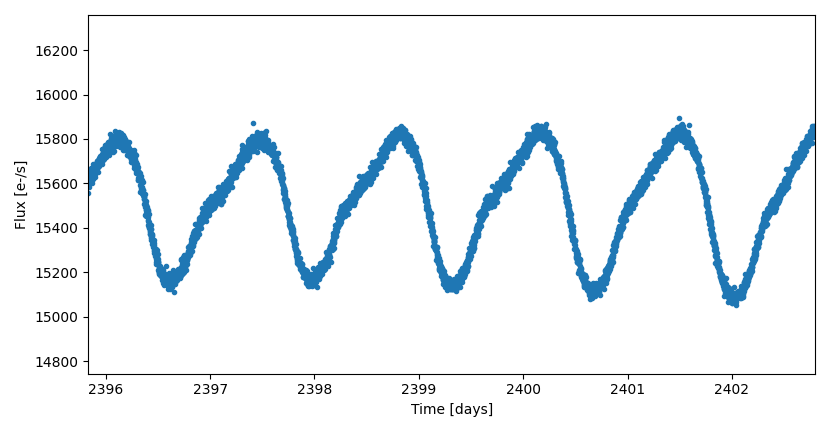
TESS light curve of a BY Dra-type variable star V1297 Her

BY Draconis variables are variable stars of late spectral types, usually K or M, and typically belong to the main sequence. The name comes from the archetype for this category of variable star system, BY Draconis. They exhibit variations in their luminosity due to rotation of the star coupled with starspots, and other chromospheric activity. Resultant brightness fluctuations are generally less than 0.5 magnitudes. Light curves of BY Draconis variables are quasiperiodic. The period is close to the star's mean rotational rate. The light curve is irregular over the duration of the period and it changes slightly in shape from one period to the next. For the star BY Draconis the shape of the light curve over a period remained similar for a month.

Nearby K and M stars that are BY Draconis variables include Barnard's Star, Kapteyn's Star, 61 Cygni, Ross 248, Lacaille 8760, Lalande 21185, Epsilon Eridani and Luyten 726-8. Ross 248 is the first discovered BY Draconis variable, the variability having been identified by Gerald Edward Kron in 1950. The variability of BY Draconis itself was discovered in 1966 and studied in detail by Pavel Fedorovich Chugainov over the period 1973–1976.

Some of these stars may exhibit flares, resulting in additional variations of the UV Ceti type. Likewise, the spectra of BY Draconis variables (particularly in their H and K lines) are similar to RS CVn stars, which are another class of variable stars that have active chromospheres.
