= List of stars in Reticulum =

This is the list of notable stars in the constellation Reticulum, sorted by decreasing brightness.

Name	B	Var	HD	HIP	RA	Dec	vis. mag.	abs. mag.	Dist. (ly)	Sp. class	Notes
α Ret	α		27256	19780	04^{h} 14^{m} 25.43^{s}	−62° 28′ 26.3″	3.33	−0.17	163	G7III	Rhombus, double star
β Ret	β		23817	17440	03^{h} 44^{m} 11.55^{s}	−64° 48′ 25.5″	3.84	1.41	100	K0IV SB	binary star system, spectroscopic binary
ε Ret	ε		27442	19921	04^{h} 16^{m} 29.08^{s}	−59° 18′ 06.3″	4.44	3.14	59	K2IV	double star; component A has a planet (b)
γ Ret	γ		25705	18744	04^{h} 00^{m} 53.81^{s}	−62° 09′ 33.7″	4.48	−1.41	490	M4III	semiregular variable, V_{max} = 4.42^{m}, V_{min} = 4.64^{m}, P = 25 d
δ Ret	δ		25422	18597	03^{h} 58^{m} 44.74^{s}	−61° 24′ 00.5″	4.56	−1.50	530	M2III	irregular variable, V_{max} = 4.54^{m}, V_{min} = 4.59^{m}
κ Ret	κ		22001	16245	03^{h} 29^{m} 22.19^{s}	−62° 56′ 18.4″	4.71	3.05	70	F5IV-V	binary star
ι Ret	ι		25728	18772	04^{h} 01^{m} 18.07^{s}	−61° 04′ 44.6″	4.97	−0.06	331	K4III	
ζ^{2} Ret	ζ^{2}		20807	15371	03^{h} 18^{m} 11.14^{s}	−62° 30′ 28.6″	5.24	4.83	39	G1V	component of the ζ Ret system
η Ret	η		28093	20384	04^{h} 21^{m} 53.22^{s}	−63° 23′ 12.5″	5.24	−0.09	380	G7III	
HD 27304			27304	19805	04^{h} 14^{m} 48.55^{s}	−62° 11′ 31.4″	5.45	0.88	267	K0III	double star
ζ^{1} Ret	ζ^{1}		20766	15330	03^{h} 17^{m} 44.47^{s}	−62° 34′ 36.8″	5.53	5.11	40	G2V	component of the ζ Ret system; suspected variable
HD 28732			28732	20825	04^{h} 27^{m} 46.04^{s}	−62° 31′ 16.4″	5.74	0.72	329	K0III	double star
HD 29399			29399	21253	04^{h} 33^{m} 34.10^{s}	−62° 49′ 25.1″	5.79	2.48	150	K1III	binary star; suspected variable
HD 22252			22252	16368	03^{h} 30^{m} 51.68^{s}	−66° 29′ 23.0″	5.81	−1.27	851	B8V	
θ Ret	θ		27657	20020	04^{h} 17^{m} 40.27^{s}	−63° 15′ 19.8″	5.88	0.12	462	B9III-IV	double star; suspected variable, V_{max} = 5.86^{m}, V_{min} = 5.90^{m}
HD 28413			28413	20619	04^{h} 25^{m} 05.36^{s}	−61° 14′ 17.7″	5.94	−0.53	642	K4/K5III	suspected variable
HD 20888			20888	15353	03^{h} 17^{m} 58.99^{s}	−66° 55′ 36.8″	6.03	2.21	189	A3V	
HD 25346			25346	18592	03^{h} 58^{m} 42.87^{s}	−57° 06′ 08.6″	6.05	2.10	201	F2IV	
HD 25170			25170	18401	03^{h} 56^{m} 03.90^{s}	−63° 27′ 49.8″	6.14	0.86	371	K1/K2III	
HD 23697			23697	17464	03^{h} 44^{m} 33.86^{s}	−54° 16′ 27.1″	6.29	1.83	254	K1III	double star
TT Ret		TT	27463	19917	04^{h} 16^{m} 20.92^{s}	−60° 56′ 54.8″	6.34	0.96	388	Ap EuCr(Sr)	double star; α^{2} CVn variable, , P = 2.83507 d
HD 26491			26491	19233	04^{h} 07^{m} 21.29^{s}	−64° 13′ 23.2″	6.37	4.54	76	G3V	
HD 22382			22382	16531	03^{h} 32^{m} 51.46^{s}	−61° 01′ 01.2″	6.42	0.82	429	K0III	
HD 23079	(π) (Note: Labelled Pi Horologii (π Hor/π Horologii) by Bode in his Uranographia)		23079	17096	03^{h} 39^{m} 43.10^{s}	−52° 54′ 57.0″	7.1	4.40	113	F9.5V	Tupi, has a planet (b)
HD 25171			25171	18387	03^{h} 55^{m} 49^{s}	−65° 11′ 12″	7.79		179	F8V	has a planet (b)
HD 21693			21693	16085	03^{h} 27^{m} 12^{s}	−58° 19′ 25″	7.94		105	G9IV	has two planets (b & c)
HD 21749			21749	16069	03^{h} 27^{m} 00.0^{s}	−63° 30′ 08″	8.1		53	K4.5	has two planets (b & c)
HD 23127			23127	17054	03^{h} 39^{m} 23.64^{s}	−60° 04′ 40.2″	8.56	3.81	291	G2V	has a planet (b)
HD 20586	(ξ) (Note: Labelled Xi Horologii (ξ Hor/ξ Horologii) by Bode in his Uranographia)		20586	14900	03^{h} 12^{m} 16.19^{s}	–79° 23′ 20.7″	8.85		2,673	K3III	
R Ret		R, S	29383	21252	04^{h} 33^{m} 32.83^{s}	−63° 01′ 45.0″	9.23	−1.71	5015	M4e-M7.5e	Mira variable, V_{max} = 6.35^{m}, V_{min} = 14.2^{m}, P = 281 d
HD 27894			27894	20277	04^{h} 20^{m} 47.05^{s}	−59° 24′ 39.0″	9.42	6.28	138	K2V	has at least three planets (b, c & d)
HD 23472			23472	17264	03^{h} 41^{m} 50.0^{s}	−62° 46′ 01″	9.7		128	K3.5V	has five transiting planets (e, f, d, b, c according to ExoFOP-TESS)
WASP-100					04^{h} 35^{m} 50.0^{s}	−64° 01′ 37″	10.8			F2	has a transiting planet (b)
WASP-119					03^{h} 43^{m} 46.0^{s}	−65° 11′ 38″	12.2		1086	G5	has a transiting planet (b)
NGC 1313 X-2					03^{h} 18^{m} 22.00^{s}	−66° 36′ 04.3″	23.6		12800000		ultraluminous X-ray source
WISE 0359-5401					03^{h} 59^{m} 34.06^{s}	−66° 36′ 04.3″			19.2	Y0	brown dwarf
WISE 0350-5658					03^{h} 50^{m} 00.32^{s}	−54° 01′ 54.6″			12.1	Y1	brown dwarf
Table legend: • Name = Proper name • B = Bayer designation • F or/and G. = Flamsteed designation or Gould designation • Var = Variable star designation • HD = Henry Draper Catalogue designation number • HIP = Hipparcos Catalogue designation number • RA = Right ascension for the Epoch/Equinox J2000.0 • Dec = Declination for the Epoch/Equinox J2000.0 • vis. mag. = visual magnitude (m or m_{v}), also known as apparent magnitude • abs. mag. = absolute magnitude (M_{v}) • Dist. (ly) = Distance in light-years from Earth • Sp. class = Spectral class of the star in the stellar classification system • Notes = Common name(s) or alternate name(s); comments; notable properties [for example: multiple star status, range of variability if it is a variable star, exoplanets, etc.]

== See also ==
- List of stars by constellation
