= Tupý =

Tupý may refer to:

- Karel Eugen Tupý (1813–1881), a Czech poet
- Daniel Tupý (1984–2005), a murdered Slovak university student

== See also ==
- Tupi (disambiguation)
- Tupy (disambiguation)
- Tuppy
