= Brazilian ship Tupi =

Tupi, also spelled Tupy, is the name of the following ships of the Brazilian Navy, named for the Tupi people:

- Brazilian cruiser Tupi, lead torpedo cruiser of the Tupi class serving with Tamoio and Tymbira around the turn of the 20th century.
- Brazilian submarine Tupy (1937) (S11), an Adua-class submarine acquired from Italy as a Tupy or T-class submarine; operated in World War II.
- Brazilian submarine Tupi (S30), lead Tupi-class submarine, launched in 1987, in active service

== See also ==
- Tupi (disambiguation)
- Tupy (disambiguation)
