= Reticulum in Chinese astronomy =

The modern constellation Reticulum is not included in the Three Enclosures and Twenty-Eight Mansions system of traditional Chinese uranography because its stars are too far south for observers in China to know about them prior to the introduction of Western star charts. Based on the work of Xu Guangqi and the German Jesuit missionary Johann Adam Schall von Bell in the late Ming Dynasty, this constellation has been classified as two of the 23 Southern Asterisms (近南極星區, Jìnnánjíxīngōu) under the name Snake's Head (蛇首, Shéshǒu) and White Patches Attached (夾白, Jiābái).

The name of the western constellation in modern Chinese is 網罟座 (wǎng gǔ zuò), meaning "net for birds or fish constellation".

== Stars ==
The map of Chinese constellation in constellation Reticulum area consists of:

Four Symbols	Mansion (Chinese name)	Romanization	Translation	Asterisms (Chinese name)	Romanization	Translation	Western star name	Proper Name	Chinese star name	Romanization	Translation
-	近南極星區 (non-mansions)	Jìnnánjíxīngōu (non-mansions)	The Southern Asterisms (non-mansions)								
-	近南極星區 (non-mansions)	Jìnnánjíxīngōu (non-mansions)	The Southern Asterisms (non-mansions)	蛇首	Shéshǒu	Snake's Head	β Ret		蛇首二	Shéshǒuèr	2nd star
-	近南極星區 (non-mansions)	Jìnnánjíxīngōu (non-mansions)	The Southern Asterisms (non-mansions)	夾白	Jiābái	White Patches Attached	α Ret	Rhombus	夾白二	Jiābáièr	2nd star

== See also ==
- Chinese astronomy
- Traditional Chinese star names
- Chinese constellations
