= SN 2005df =

2005 supernova event in the constellation Reticulum

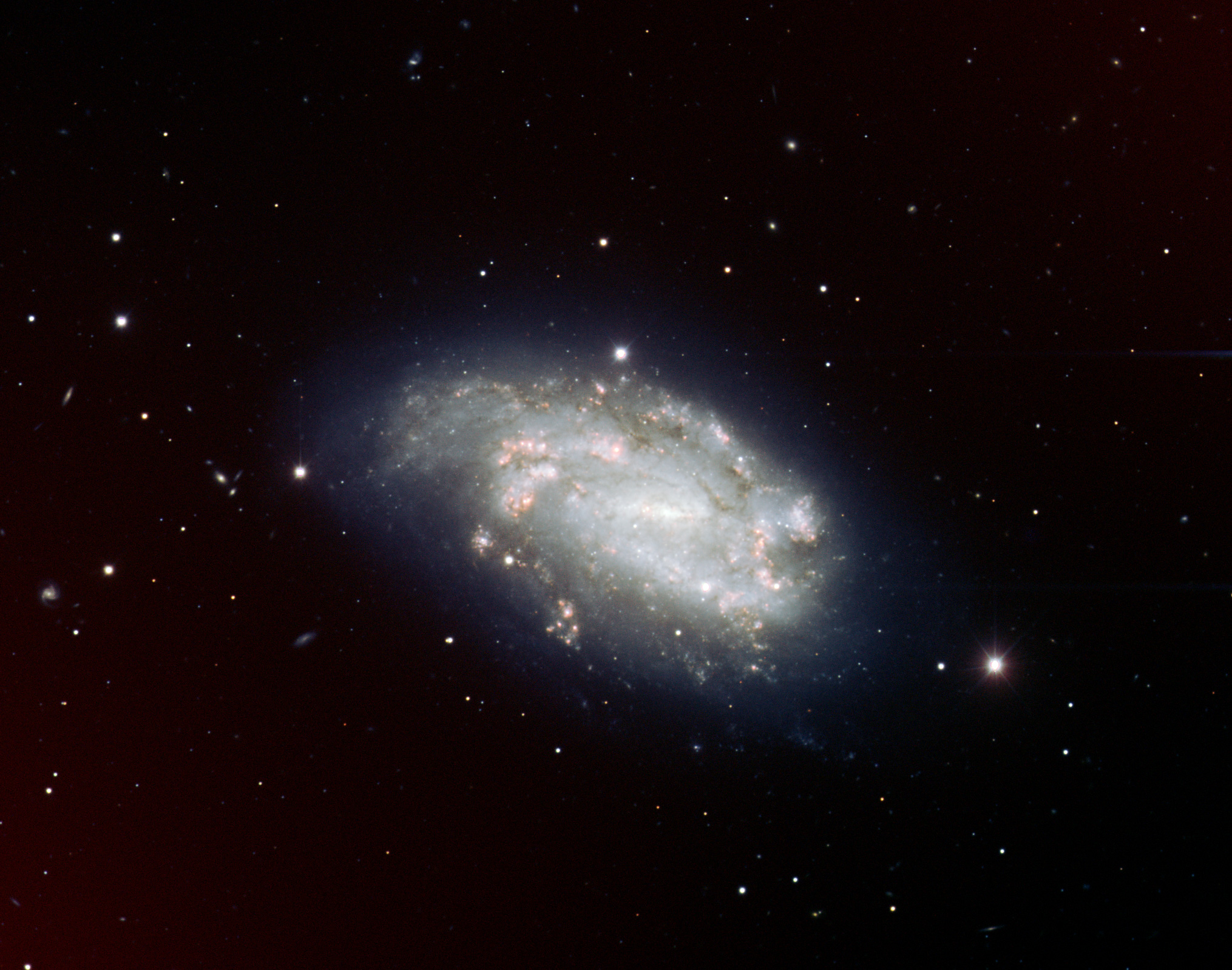
- SN 2005df is visible as the bright spot just above the galaxy
- Event type: Supernova
- Type Ia
- Date: 4 August 2005 by Robert Evans (UTC)
- Constellation: Reticulum
- Right ascension: 04^{h} 17^{m} 37.85^{s}
- Declination: −62° 46′ 09.5″
- Epoch: J2000
- Galactic coordinates: l = 274.49°, b = −41.2°
- Distance: 12.59 ± 0.20 Mpc (41.06 ± 0.65 Mly)
- Redshift: 0.0043
- Host: NGC 1559
- Progenitor type: White dwarf
- Notable features: First supernova observed in NGC 1559 since 1986; brightest of 2005
- Peak apparent magnitude: 12.3

SN 2005df was a Type Ia supernova in the barred spiral galaxy NGC 1559, which is located in the southern constellation of Reticulum. The event was discovered in Australia by Robert Evans on the early morning of 5 August 2005 with a 13.8 magnitude, and was confirmed by Alan Gilmore on 6 August. The supernova was classified as Type Ia by M. Salvo and associates. It was positioned at an offset of 15″ east and 40″ north of the galaxy's nucleus, reaching a maximum brightness of 12.3 on 18 August. The supernova luminosity appeared unreddened by dust from its host galaxy.

The progenitor was a carbon-oxygen white dwarf close to the Chandrasekhar limit, making a merger scenario unlikely. Modelling of the explosion shows a low central density for a hydrogen accretion scenario, suggesting the donating companion was a helium star or a tidally-disrupted white dwarf. Alternatively, the progenitor may have undergone some form of central mixing.
