= Tupy =

Tupy may refer to:

- Tupy, a cultivar of blackberry
- Tupy Futebol Clube, a Brazilian football club
- Esporte Clube Tupy, a Brazilian football club
- Karel Eugen Tupý, a Czech poet
- Daniel Tupý (1984–2005), a student from Slovakia, murder victim of a hate crime

== See also ==
- Tupý (disambiguation)
- Tupi (disambiguation)
