= Theta Reticuli =

Star in the constellation Reticulum

- Location of θ Reticuli (circled)

Observation data Epoch J2000.0 Equinox J2000.0 (ICRS)
- Constellation: Reticulum
- Right ascension: 04^{h} 17^{m} 40.27169^{s}
- Declination: −63° 15′ 19.4882″
- Apparent magnitude (V): 5.88 6.05 + 7.65

Characteristics

θ Ret A
- Spectral type: B9IV
- B−V color index: −0.09
- Variable type: suspected

θ Ret B
- Spectral type: kA2hA5VmA7
- B−V color index: +0.14

Astrometry

θ Ret A
Radial velocity (R_{v})	3.0±7.4 km/s
Proper motion (μ)	RA: +6.273 mas/yr Dec.: +35.360 mas/yr
Parallax (π)	7.0053±0.0401 mas
Distance	466 ± 3 ly (142.7 ± 0.8 pc)
Absolute magnitude (M_{V})	−0.04

θ Ret B
Proper motion (μ)	RA: +8.512 mas/yr Dec.: +35.235 mas/yr
Parallax (π)	7.1837±0.0540 mas
Distance	454 ± 3 ly (139 ± 1 pc)

Details

θ Ret A
Mass	3.363±0.117 M_{☉}
Luminosity	179 L_{☉}
Temperature	11,967 K
Rotation	2.9686 d
Age	166 Myr

θ Ret B
Mass	≥ 1.18 M_{☉}
Temperature	9,132 K
Age	200 Myr

Other designations
- θ^{2} Ret, CD−63°143, HD 27657, HIP 20020, HR 1372, WDS J04177-6315
- θ Ret A: NSV 1556, GC 5233, SAO 248986
- θ Ret B: GC 5232, SAO 248985

Database references
SIMBAD	data
- A
- B

Theta Reticuli is double star in southern constellation of Reticulum, located just 50′ south of Alpha Reticuli. The pair are visible to the naked eye as a dim, white-hued point of light with a combined apparent visual magnitude of 5.88. They lie at roughly the same distance from the Sun based on parallax, with the primary being around 466 light-years away. They also share a similar proper motion, suggesting they may be gravitationally bound.

The magnitude 6.05 primary, designated component A, has a stellar classification of B9IV, matching a B-type subgiant. It is 166 million years old with 3.4 times the mass of the Sun. The star is radiating 179 times the Sun's luminosity from its photosphere at an effective temperature of 11,967 K.

As of 2015, the magnitude 7.65 secondary, component B, had an angular separation of 4.10″ from the primary along a position angle of 3°. It is most likely a very young main-sequence star, and is an Am star with a stellar classification of kA2hA5VmA7. This notation indicates the spectrum displays the K-line of an A2-type star, the hydrogen lines of a cooler A5 star, and the metal lines of an A7 star. This system is a source of X-ray emission, which may be coming from the companion.
