= Tupi =

Tupi may refer to:

- Tupi people of Brazil
- Tupi or Tupian languages, spoken in South America
  - Tupi language, a dead Tupian language spoken by the Tupi people
- Tupi oil field off the coast of Brazil
- Tupi Paulista, a Brazilian municipality
- Tupi, South Cotabato, a Philippine municipality
  - Tupi National High School
- Tupi-class submarine, a Brazilian Navy version of the German Type 209 submarine
  - Brazilian submarine Tupi, the lead submarine of the class, commissioned in 1989
- Tupi Football Club, a Brazilian football (soccer) club
- Brazil national rugby union team, nicknamed Os Tupis
- Rede Tupi, the first Brazilian TV network (1950–1980) and a defunct Brazilian TV network.
- The tupi blackberry, a Mexican hybrid of the Comanche and Uruguai varieties
- Tupi (software), free and open source 2D animation software
- Tupí fermented cheese
- The proper name of the star HD 23079

== See also ==
- Tupiniquim, an Amerindian tribe who live in Brazil
- Tupy (disambiguation)
- Tupý (disambiguation)
