= Delta Reticuli =

Star in the constellation Reticulum

- Location of δ Reticuli (circled)

Observation data Epoch J2000.0 Equinox J2000.0 (ICRS)
- Constellation: Reticulum
- Right ascension: 03^{h} 58^{m} 44.74945^{s}
- Declination: −61° 24′ 00.6673″
- Apparent magnitude (V): 4.60

Characteristics
- Evolutionary stage: asymptotic giant branch
- Spectral type: M2 III
- U−B color index: +2.02
- B−V color index: +1.61
- Variable type: Suspected

Astrometry
Radial velocity (R_{v})	−1.4±2.8 km/s
Proper motion (μ)	RA: +9.80 mas/yr Dec.: −14.30 mas/yr
Parallax (π)	6.20±0.25 mas
Distance	530 ± 20 ly (161 ± 7 pc)
Absolute magnitude (M_{V})	−1.47

Details
Radius	56 R_{☉}
Luminosity	1,100 L_{☉}
Temperature	3,891 K

Other designations
- δ Ret, CPD−61 290, FK5 1110, HD 25422, HIP 18597, HR 1247, SAO 248918

Database references
SIMBAD	data

Delta Reticuli (Delta Ret, δ Reticuli, δ Ret) is a star in the southern constellation of Reticulum. It is visible to the naked eye, having an apparent visual magnitude of 4.60. The distance to this star, as estimated from its annual parallax shift of 6.20 mas, is roughly 530 light-years from the Sun.

This is an evolved red giant star on the asymptotic giant branch, having a stellar classification of M2 III. It has expanded to around 56 times the radius of the Sun and radiates 1,100 times the solar luminosity from its cool outer atmosphere at an effective temperature of 3,891 K.

Delta Reticuli is moving through the Milky Way at a speed of 13.3 km/s relative to the Sun. Its projected galactic orbit carries it between 22,700 and 30,400 light-years from the center of the galaxy.
