= HD 21693 =

Star in the constellation of Reticulum

Observation data Epoch J2000.0 Equinox J2000.0
- Constellation: Reticulum
- Right ascension: 03^{h} 27^{m} 12.482^{s}
- Declination: −58° 19′ 25.25″
- Apparent magnitude (V): 7.94

Characteristics
- Evolutionary stage: main sequence
- Spectral type: G9IV-V
- B−V color index: 0.761

Astrometry
Radial velocity (R_{v})	39.64±0.12 km/s
Proper motion (μ)	RA: 248.88 mas/yr Dec.: 94.75 mas/yr
Parallax (π)	30.0199±0.0339 mas
Distance	108.6 ± 0.1 ly (33.31 ± 0.04 pc)
Absolute magnitude (M_{V})	5.39

Details
Mass	0.896±0.033 M_{☉}
Radius	0.93 R_{☉}
Luminosity	0.66 L_{☉}
Surface gravity (log g)	4.37±0.04 cgs
Temperature	5,430±26 K
Metallicity [Fe/H]	0.00±0.02 dex
Rotation	35.2±4.0 days
Rotational velocity (v sin i)	1.6 km/s
Age	6.8±4.4 Gyr

Other designations
- CD−58°689, HD 21693, HIP 16085, SAO 233126

Database references
SIMBAD	data

HD 21693 is a star in the constellation Reticulum. It has an apparent visual magnitude of 7.94, therefore it is not visible to the naked eye. From its parallax measured by the Gaia spacecraft, it is located at a distance of 108.6 light-years (33.3 parsecs) from Earth.

This is a G-type star with a spectral type of G9IV-V, with features intermediate between main sequence and subgiant. In 2011, the discovery of two Neptune-mass exoplanets around HD 21693 was announced.

== Star ==
This star is classified with a spectral type of G9IV-V, indicating it is a slightly evolved star that is between the main sequence and the subgiant branch. Stellar evolution models suggest that it is right at the end of the main sequence, on the hook before the subgiant turnoff, with a mass of 0.90 M_{☉} and an age of around 7 billion years, although with a high uncertainty of plus or minus 4 billion years. From its Gaia-measured distance and brightness, it is calculated to have a radius of 0.93 R_{☉} and a luminosity of 0.66 L_{☉}. Its effective temperature is 5,430 K and its metallicity, the proportion of elements heavier than helium, and approximately equal to that of the Sun.

HD 21693 exhibits a stellar activity cycle with a period of 10 years, similar to the solar cycle, evidenced by long-term variations in various spectral activity indicators. Its log R′_{HK} chromospheric activity index varies between −5.02 and −4.83 during the cycle, an amplitude that is similar to that of the Sun's magnetic cycle. This index also shows a weaker variation with a period of 33.5 days, which may correspond to the star's rotation period. The activity cycle also affects the radial velocity of the star, which had to be taken into account when creating the orbital solution of the planets in the system.

HD 21693 has no known companion stars. One observation by the NACO instrument at the Very Large Telescope failed to detect other stars in the system, with a detection limit of 0.09 M_{☉} at 0.5 arcseconds (16.7 AU).

== Planetary system ==
In 2011 the discovery of two exoplanets orbiting HD 21693 was announced, detected by the radial velocity method using observations taken by the HARPS spectrograph, at the La Silla Observatory. The detailed analysis of the discovery was only published in 2019. The HARPS instrument made 210 measurements of the star's radial velocity between 2003 and 2015, revealing two period signals caused by the gravitational influence of orbiting planets, plus a 10-year signal caused by the star's activity cycle. The planetary signals have no equivalent in the star's spectral activity indicators, which confirms their planetary nature. The radial velocity residuals, after removing all periodic signals, still show higher variability than expected, which can be caused by strong granulation on the star's surface.

The inner planet, HD 21693 b, has a minimum mass of 8.2 M_{🜨} and is the transition regime between super-Earths and Neptune-mass planets. Since the radial velocity method used in its discovery cannot determine the inclination of its orbit, the planet's true mass cannot be determined, although the true mass is usually close to the minimum value. This planet orbits the star at a distance of 0.15 AU with a period of 22.7 days.

The outer planet, HD 21693 c, has a minimum mass of 17.4 M_{🜨}, similar to the mass of Neptune. It is located at a distance of 0.26 AU from the star and has an orbital period of 53.7 days. The planets in the system have a period ratio of 2.37, which is close to a 5:2 commensurability. In one possible formation scenario, they experienced convergent migration shortly after their formation, which trapped them in a 5:2 resonance, but this resonance was lost shortly after the dissipation of the protoplanetary disk.

The HD 21693 planetary system
Companion (in order from star)	Mass	Semimajor axis (AU)	Orbital period (days)	Eccentricity	Inclination	Radius
b	≥8.23+1.08 −1.05 M_{🜨}	0.1455+0.0058 −0.0063	22.6786+0.0085 −0.0087	0.12+0.09 −0.08	—	—
c	≥17.37+1.77 −1.79 M_{🜨}	0.2586+0.0103 −0.0113	53.7357+0.0312 −0.0309	0.07+0.06 −0.05	—	—

== See also ==
- Stars with planets discovered in the same paper: HD 20003, HD 20781, HD 31527, HD 45184, HD 51608, HD 134060, HD 136352
