= Kardašova Řečice =

- Town
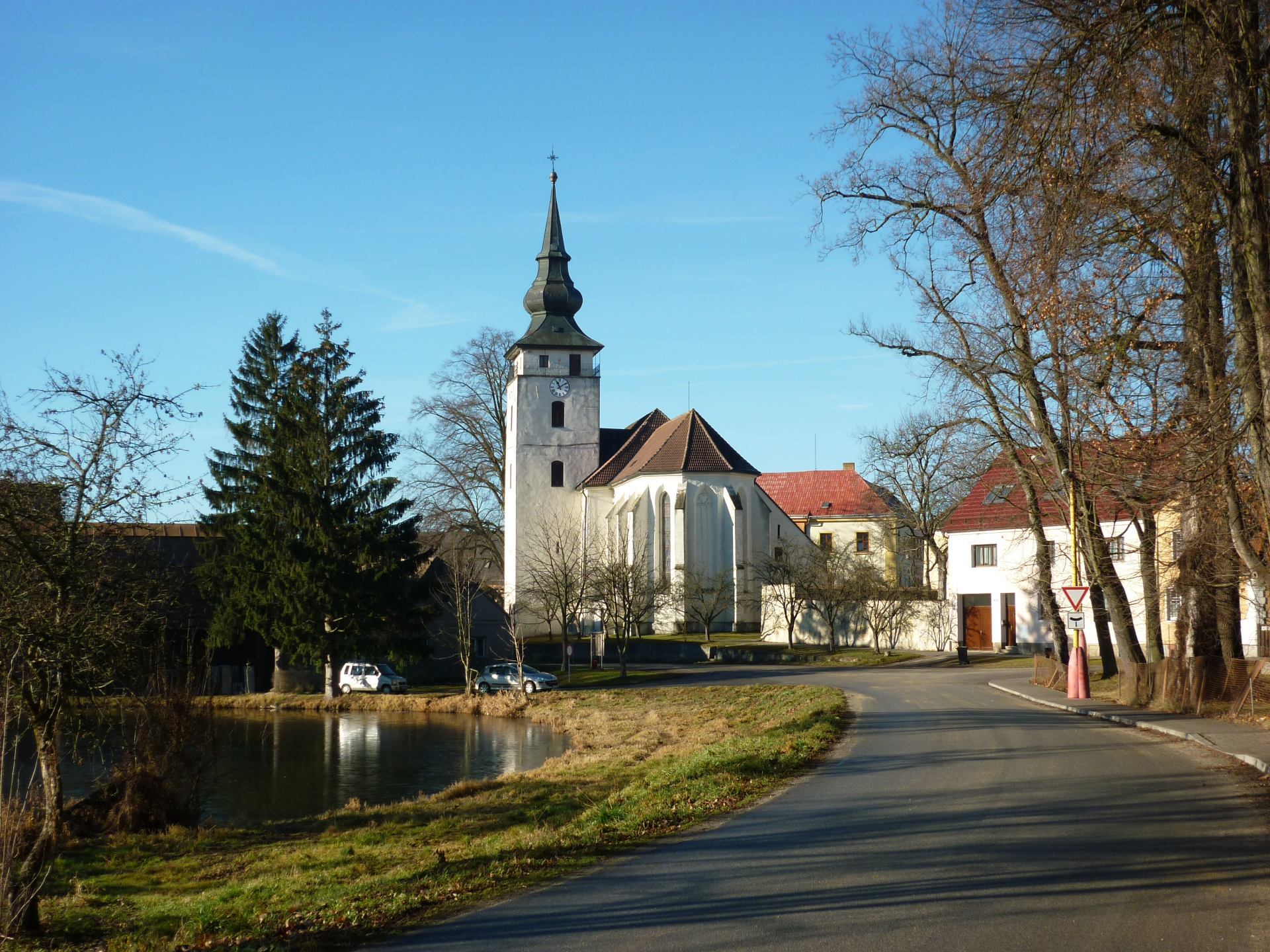
- Church of Saint John the Baptist

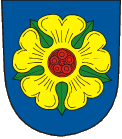
- Flag Coat of arms

- Location in the Czech Republic
- Coordinates: 49°11′5″N 14°51′11″E
- Country: Czech Republic
- Region: South Bohemian
- District: Jindřichův Hradec
- First mentioned: 1267

Government
  - Mayor: Dana Machová

Area
  - Total: 45.83 km^{2} (17.70 sq mi)
- Elevation: 439 m (1,440 ft)

Population (2026-01-01)
  - Total: 2,227
  - Density: 48.59/km^{2} (125.9/sq mi)
- Time zone: UTC+1 (CET)
  - Summer (DST): UTC+2 (CEST)
- Postal code: 378 21
- Website: www.kardasova-recice.cz

Kardašova Řečice (Czech pronunciation: [ˈkardaʃova ˈr̝ɛtʃɪtsɛ]) is a town in Jindřichův Hradec District in the South Bohemian Region of the Czech Republic. It has about 2,200 inhabitants. The town is located on the Řečice Stream in the Třeboň Basin.

== Administrative division ==
Kardašova Řečice consists of three municipal parts (in brackets population according to the 2021 census):

- Kardašova Řečice (1,957)
- Mnich (86)
- Nítovice (104)

== Etymology ==
The name Řečice was transferred to the settlement from the local watercourse. The Czech word řečice is an old diminutive form of the word řeka, i.e. 'river'. The attribute Kardašova ("Kardaš's") refers to the fishpond Kardaš north of the town, which was named after someone called Kardaš.

== Geography ==
Kardašova Řečice is located about 11 kilometres (7 mi) northwest of Jindřichův Hradec and 35 km (22 mi) northeast of České Budějovice. It lies in the Třeboň Basin; the southern part of the municipal territory lies also in the Třeboňsko Protected Landscape Area. The highest point is a nameless hill at 520 m (1,710 ft) above sea level. The Řečice Stream flows through the town. The municipal territory is rich in small streams and fishponds.

== History ==
The first written mention of Kardašova Řečice is from 1267.

== Demographics ==
Historical population

Year	Pop.	±%
1869	3,045	—
1880	3,020	−0.8%
1890	3,148	+4.2%
1900	3,129	−0.6%
1910	3,018	−3.5%

Year	Pop.	±%
1921	2,948	−2.3%
1930	2,779	−5.7%
1950	2,322	−16.4%
1961	2,450	+5.5%
1970	2,185	−10.8%

Year	Pop.	±%
1980	2,135	−2.3%
1991	2,105	−1.4%
2001	2,033	−3.4%
2011	2,225	+9.4%
2021	2,147	−3.5%

Source: Censuses

== Transport ==
The I/23 road (the section that connects the D3 motorway with Jindřichův Hradec) passes through the town.

Kardašova Řečice is located on the railway line České Budějovice–Jihlava.

== Sights ==
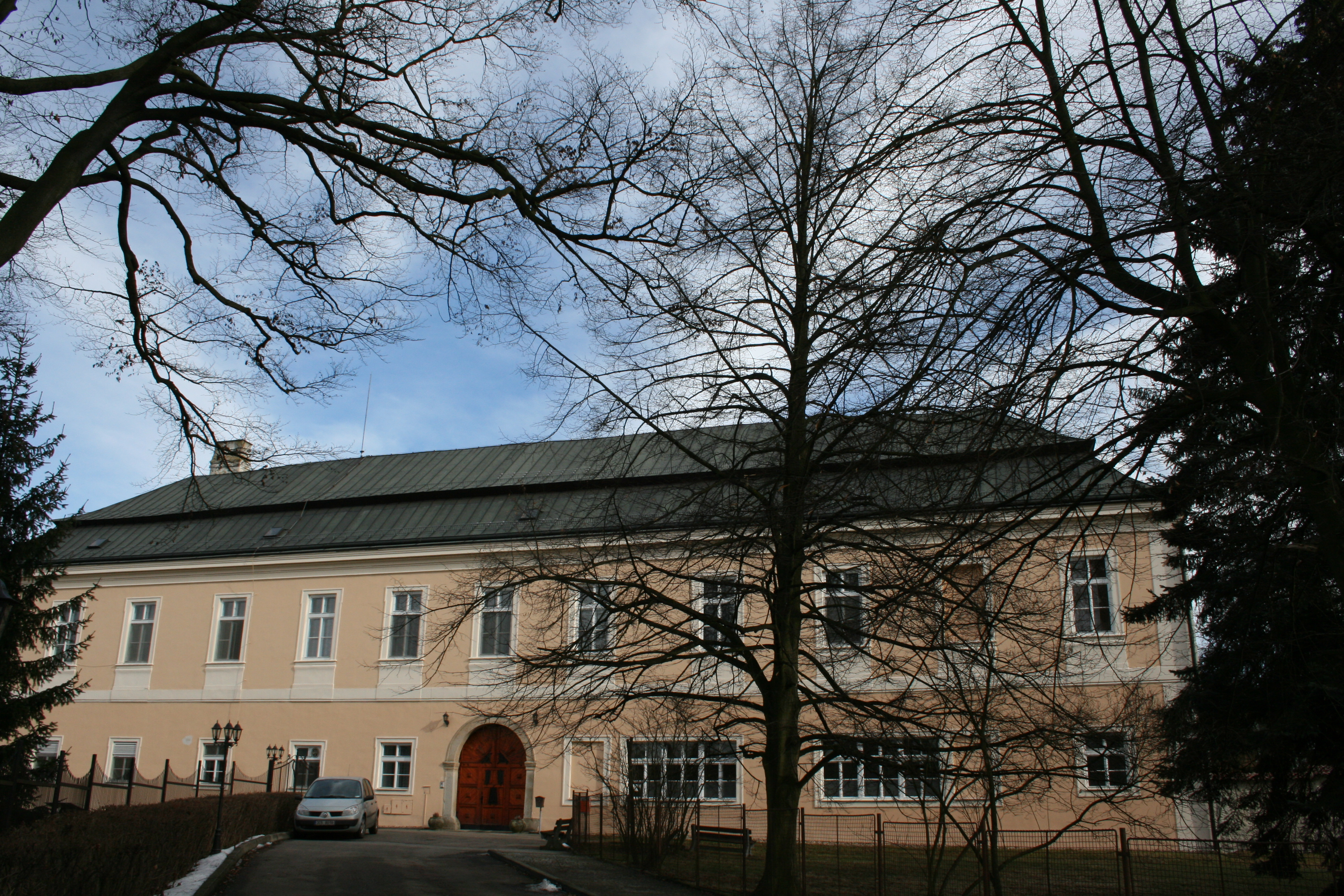
Kardašova Řečice Castle

The main landmark of the town is the Church of Saint John the Baptist. It was an early Gothic church from the mid-13th century, rebuilt in 1380. In 1615–1620, the tower was finished. The reconstruction to its present form took place in 1814.

The Kardašova Řečice Castle is a Baroque building from the 1720s. Since 1989, it has been owned by the Congregation of the School Sisters of Notre Dame, which established a retirement home there. The castle includes an English park. Both the castle and the park are not accessible to the public.

== Notable people ==
- Boleslav Jablonský (1813–1881), Catholic priest and poet
- Stanislav Komárek (born 1958), biologist, philosopher and writer

== Twin towns – sister cities ==
Kardašova Řečice is twinned with:

- Oberdiessbach, Switzerland
