= Kappa Reticuli =

Star system in the constellation Reticulum

- Location of κ Reticuli (circled)

Observation data Epoch J2000.0 Equinox J2000.0 (ICRS)
- Constellation: Reticulum
- Right ascension: 03^{h} 29^{m} 22.67742^{s}
- Declination: −62° 56′ 15.1042″
- Apparent magnitude (V): +4.71 + 10.7

Characteristics
- Spectral type: F3 V or F3 IV/V + M1
- U−B color index: −0.04
- B−V color index: +0.39

Astrometry
Radial velocity (R_{v})	+12.96±0.13 km/s
Proper motion (μ)	RA: +382.538 mas/yr Dec.: +373.589 mas/yr
Parallax (π)	45.9103±0.0934 mas
Distance	71.0 ± 0.1 ly (21.78 ± 0.04 pc)
Absolute magnitude (M_{V})	+2.98

Details

κ Ret A
Mass	1.34+0.05 −0.04 M_{☉}
Radius	1.65±0.03 R_{☉}
Luminosity	4.95+0.25 −0.23 L_{☉}
Surface gravity (log g)	4.10±0.10 cgs
Temperature	6,700+56 −52 K
Metallicity [Fe/H]	−0.17±0.07 dex
Rotational velocity (v sin i)	14.3±0.6 km/s
Age	2.29+0.43 −0.39 Gyr

κ Ret B
Mass	0.54 M_{☉}
Radius	0.50 R_{☉}
Luminosity	0.043 L_{☉}
Temperature	3,733 K

Other designations
- κ Ret, 4 Ret, CD−63°112, FK5 126, HD 22001, HIP 16245, HR 1083, SAO 248819, WDS J03294-6256A

Database references
SIMBAD	data

Kappa Reticuli (κ Reticuli) is a binary star system in the southern constellation of Reticulum. It is visible to the naked eye, having a combined apparent visual magnitude of +4.71. Based upon an annual parallax shift of 45.91 mas as seen from Earth, it is located at a distance of 71 light-years. Based upon its space velocity components, this star is a member of the Hyades supercluster of stars that share a common motion through space.

Houk and Cowley (1978) catalogued the yellow-hued primary, component A, with a stellar classification of F3 IV/V, indicating this is an F-type star that showing mixed traits of a main-sequence and a more evolved subgiant star. Later, Grey et al. (2006) listed a class of F3 V, suggesting it is an F-type main-sequence star. It is emitting a statistically significant amount of infrared excess, suggesting the presence of an orbiting debris disk. The secondary, component B, is an orange-hued star with a visual magnitude of 10.4 at an angular separation of 54 arcseconds from the primary.
