= Reticulum II =

Dwarf galaxy

Observation data (J2000 epoch)
- Constellation: Reticulum
- Right ascension: 03^{h} 35^{m} 42.14^{s}
- Declination: −54° 2′ 57.1″
- Distance: 103 kly (31.6 kpc)
- Apparent magnitude (V): 17.4

Characteristics
- Apparent size (V): 3.37′ × 3.64′
- Notable features: Enriched in r-process elements

Other designations
- Reticulum II, Reticulum 2

Reticulum II (or Reticulum 2) is a dwarf galaxy in the Local Group. Reticulum II was discovered in 2015 by analysing images from the Dark Energy Survey. It is a satellite of the Magellanic Clouds and was probably captured relatively recently. Like other dwarf spheroidal galaxies, its stellar population is old: the galaxy was quenched before 11.5 billion years ago.

Reticulum II is elongated, having a major/minor axis ratio of 0.6. The size is given by a half-light radius of 15 parsecs (pc). This is too large for it to be a globular cluster. The absolute magnitude (M_{V}) of the galaxy is −2.7. The distance from Earth is about 30 kpc. The galaxy contains some blue horizontal branch stars. Other features visible are a main sequence, and a main sequence turn off, and a red giant branch. It has an unusual enhancement of r-process elements, meaning that gold and europium are enriched in the brightest stars in the galaxy. About 72% of its stars are enriched in r-process elements. The implication of the unusual enrichment in elements heavier than zinc, is that the r-process is very rare, and only happened once in this galaxy, possibly by the collision of two neutron stars.

Gamma rays mostly with energies between 2 and 10 GeV have been detected by the Fermi satellite. The radiation from Reticulum II is more significant than that of other dwarf galaxy emissions. However this finding has been contested.

It has been named as a "globular-cluster-like dwarf".
