= HD 29399 =

Star in the constellation Reticulum

- Location of HD 29399 (circled)

Observation data Epoch J2000.0 Equinox ICRS
- Constellation: Reticulum
- Right ascension: 04^{h} 33^{m} 33.949^{s}
- Declination: −62° 49′ 25.24″
- Apparent magnitude (V): 5.780

Characteristics
- Evolutionary stage: Red-giant branch
- Spectral type: K1III
- U−B color index: +2.111
- B−V color index: +0.332

Astrometry
Radial velocity (R_{v})	31.56±0.13 km/s
Proper motion (μ)	RA: −117.58±0.04 mas/yr Dec.: −18.73±0.04 mas/yr
Parallax (π)	22.7240±0.0339 mas
Distance	143.5 ± 0.2 ly (44.01 ± 0.07 pc)

Details
Mass	1.361±0.057 M_{☉}
Radius	4.845±0.082 R_{☉}
Luminosity	11.7+0.6 −0.7 L_{☉}
Surface gravity (log g)	3.202±0.023 cgs
Temperature	4,845±52 K
Metallicity [Fe/H]	0.14±0.03 dex
Rotational velocity (v sin i)	2.48 km/s
Age	6.20±0.5 Gyr

Other designations
- CD−63°153, HD 29399, HIP 21253, HR 1475, SAO 249054

Database references
SIMBAD	data

HD 29399 is a binary star in the constellation Reticulum. Its main component is a red giant with an apparent magnitude of +5.78 which hosts an exoplanet. The secondary is a magnitude 9.2 star that is 31.9" distant from the primary. This system is only visible to the naked eye under dark skies far from light pollution. From its parallax measured by the Gaia spacecraft, it is located at a distance of 144 light-years (44 parsecs) from Earth.

== Star system ==
HD 29399 is a K-type giant star with a spectral type of K1III, which indicates it is an evolved star that has ceased hydrogen fusion in its nucleus and left the main sequence. It is now in the red-giant branch fusing hydrogen in a shell outside the core, having started is red giant life. Its main properties were inferred with high precision from an asteroseismology model created with photometric data acquired by the TESS spacecraft, which observed HD 29399 almost continuously for one year during its primary mission. HD 29399 has a mass of 1.36 M_{☉}, radius of 4.85 R_{☉}, and an age of about 6.2 billion years. It is shining with a bolometric luminosity of about 12 L_{☉}, and an effective temperature of 4,850 K. Its metallicity, the proportion of elements other than hydrogen and helium, is slightly higher than the solar value, with an iron abundance 40% greater than the Sun's.

HD 29399 is part probably of a binary system with a magnitude 9.2 star at an angular separation of 31.9 arcseconds. Astrometric data obtained by the Gaia spacecraft have confirmed that both stars have similar proper motions and distances from Earth. This star has an estimated mass of 0.79 M_{☉}, luminosity of 0.35 L_{☉}, and effective temperature of 4,900 K.

== Planetary system ==
This star was included in the Pan-Pacific Planet Search, which used the Anglo-Australian Telescope to search for exoplanets around giant stars in the southern hemisphere. A 2017 study, analyzing data from HD 29399 obtained in this survey, discovered a 765-day periodic signal in the star's radial velocity, which could be caused by an orbiting planet. However, the authors attributed this signal to a stellar magnetic cycle, reporting a periodicity in the star's light curve and a possible correlation between the radial velocity and the equivalent width of the Hα line, which both point to stellar activity being the cause of the signal. A 2022 study, using additional observations by the CORALIE spectrograph at the Leonhard Euler Telescope, confirmed the presence a 900-day signal in the star's radial velocity, and did not find evidence to support an stellar activity origin for this signal, concluding that a planet is the most likely explanation.

The planet, designated HD 29399 b, is a gas giant with a minimum mass of 1.6 M_{J}. Since the radial velocity method used in its discovery measures only the star's motion along the line of sight to Earth, the orbital inclination is unconstrained, and the planet's true mass cannot be determined. HD 29399 b takes 893 days to complete an orbit and is located at a distance of 1.91 AU from its star, which is far enough for its orbit to be unaffected by tidal forces at any point of the star's evolution. Its orbital eccentricity is small and the data are consistent with a circular orbit.

The orbital solution for HD 29399 includes a linear trend, indicating the existence of an additional body in the system. The current data are consistent with a second giant planet with a period of the order of decades, although nothing can be said with certainty about such object yet.

The HD 29399 planetary system
Companion (in order from star)	Mass	Semimajor axis (AU)	Orbital period (days)	Eccentricity	Inclination (°)	Radius
b	≥1.736±0.153 M_{J}	2.012±0.054	892.7±5.9	0.05±0.05	—	—
