= Iota Reticuli =

Star in the constellation Reticulum

- Location of ι Reticuli (circled)

Observation data Epoch J2000.0 Equinox J2000.0 (ICRS)
- Constellation: Reticulum
- Right ascension: 04^{h} 01^{m} 18.15162^{s}
- Declination: −61° 04′ 43.7559″
- Apparent magnitude (V): +4.97

Characteristics
- Spectral type: K4 III
- U−B color index: +1.70
- B−V color index: +1.42

Astrometry
Radial velocity (R_{v})	+60.5±0.8 km/s
Proper motion (μ)	RA: +66.79 mas/yr Dec.: +94.80 mas/yr
Parallax (π)	10.22±0.16 mas
Distance	319 ± 5 ly (98 ± 2 pc)
Absolute magnitude (M_{V})	+0.02

Details
Radius	24.3+1.9 −4.7 R_{☉}
Luminosity	179.8±5.1 L_{☉}
Temperature	4290+261 −158 K

Other designations
- ι Ret, CPD−61°293, HD 25728, HIP 18772, HR 1266, SAO 248927

Database references
SIMBAD	data

ι Reticuli, Latinized as Iota Reticuli, is a solitary, orange-hued star in the southern constellation of Reticulum. It is faintly visible to the naked eye, having a combined apparent visual magnitude of +4.97. Based upon an annual parallax shift of 10.22 mas as seen from Earth, it is located around 319 light years from the Sun. At present it is receding from the Sun with a radial velocity of +61 km/s, having come closest to the Sun 883,000 years ago at a distance of 212 light years. Iota Reticuli is moving through the Galaxy at a speed of 80.9 km/s relative to the Sun. Its projected Galactic orbit carries it between 12,300 and 25,100 light years from the center of the Galaxy.

This is an evolved K-type giant star with a stellar classification of K4 III. Having exhausted the supply of hydrogen at its core, the star cooled and expanded off the main sequence; at present it has 24 times the girth of the Sun. It is radiating 180 times the luminosity of the Sun from its swollen photosphere at an effective temperature of 4,290 K.
