= Gamma Reticuli =

Variable star in the constellation Reticulum

- Location of γ Reticuli (circled)

Observation data Epoch J2000.0 Equinox J2000.0 (ICRS)
- Constellation: Reticulum
- Right ascension: 04^{h} 00^{m} 53.80860^{s}
- Declination: −62° 09′ 33.4250″
- Apparent magnitude (V): 4.5

Characteristics
- Evolutionary stage: asymptotic giant branch
- Spectral type: M4 III
- U−B color index: +1.81
- B−V color index: +1.66
- Variable type: SR

Astrometry
Radial velocity (R_{v})	−7.0±2.7 km/s
Proper motion (μ)	RA: +3.03 mas/yr Dec.: +34.67 mas/yr
Parallax (π)	6.95±0.11 mas
Distance	469 ± 7 ly (144 ± 2 pc)
Absolute magnitude (M_{V})	−1.31

Details
Mass	1.5−2 M_{☉}
Radius	115 R_{☉}
Luminosity	1,846 L_{☉}
Surface gravity (log g)	0.8 cgs
Temperature	3,599 K
Metallicity [Fe/H]	0.0 dex

Other designations
- γ Ret, CD−62°149, HD 25705, HIP 18744, HR 1264, SAO 248925

Database references
SIMBAD	data

Gamma Reticuli (Gamma Ret, γ Reticuli, γ Ret) is a solitary star in the southern constellation of Reticulum. With an apparent visual magnitude of 4.5, it can be faintly seen with the naked eye. Based upon an annual parallax shift of 6.95 mas, it is located roughly 469 light years from the Sun. At that distance, the visual magnitude is diminished by an extinction factor of 0.08 due to interstellar dust.

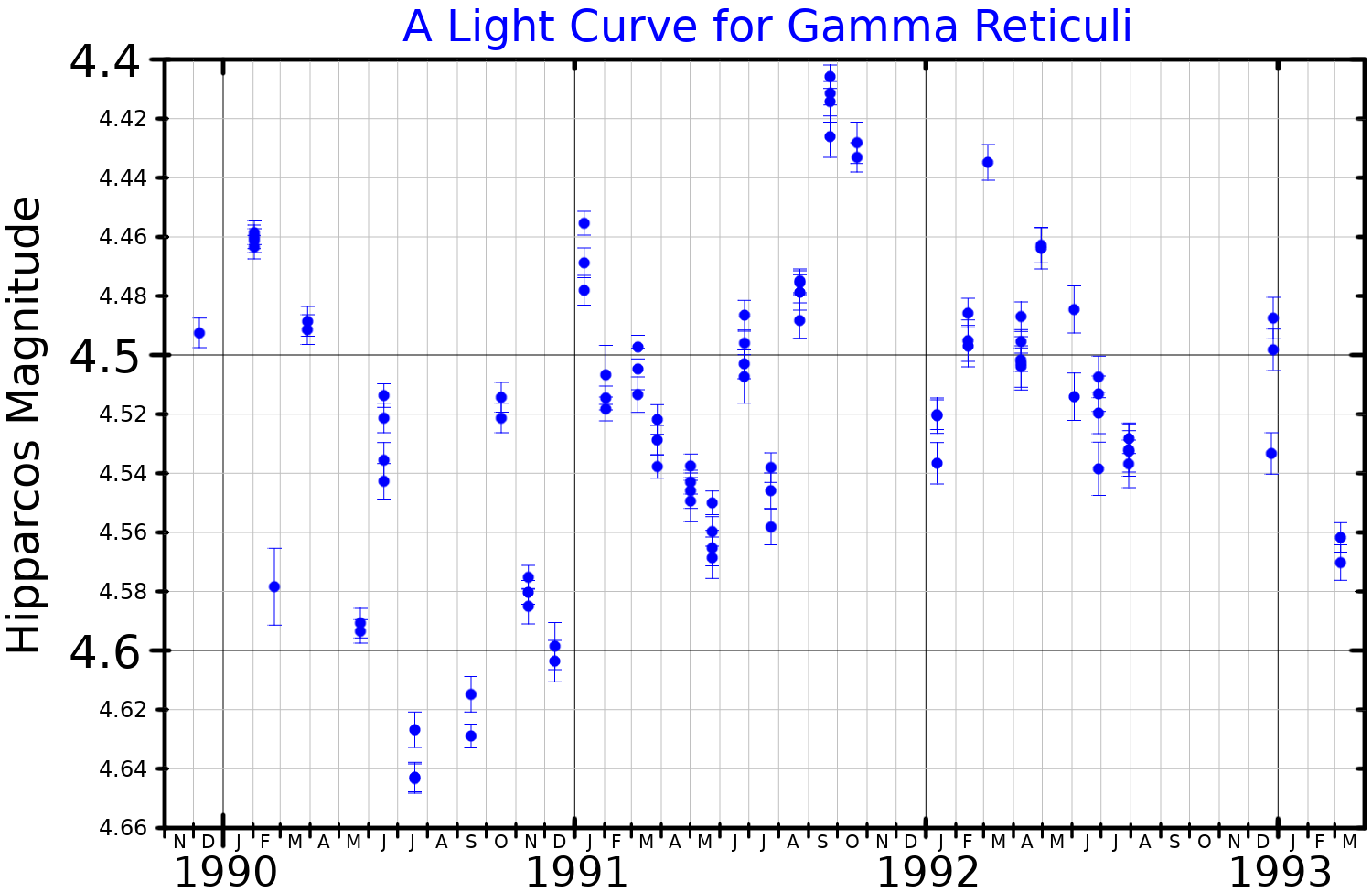
A light curve for Gamma Reticuli, plotted from Hipparcos data

This is an evolved red giant star, currently on the asymptotic giant branch, with a stellar classification of M4 III. It is a semiregular variable with a period of 25 days. Gamma Reticuli has 1.5−2 times the mass of the Sun, 115 times the Sun's radius, and radiates 1,846 times the solar luminosity from its outer atmosphere at an effective temperature of 3,450 K.

Gamma Reticuli is moving through the Galaxy at a speed of 24.8 km/s relative to the Sun. Its projected Galactic orbit carries it between 24,100 and 39,200 light years from the center of the Galaxy.
