= HD 23079 b =

Extrasolar planet in the constellation Reticulum

HD 23079 b / Guarani
Discovery
- Discovered by: Tinney et al.
- Discovery site: (Australia) Anglo-Australian Observatory
- Discovery date: October 2001
- Detection method: doppler spectroscopy

Orbital characteristics
- Semi-major axis: 1.60 ± 0.12 AU (239,000,000 ± 18,000,000 km)
- Eccentricity: 0.102 ± 0.031
- Orbital period (sidereal): 730.6 ± 5.7 d 2.000 y
- Time of periastron: 2,450,492 ± 37
- Argument of periastron: 55 ± 17
- Semi-amplitude: 54.9 ± 1.1
- Star: HD 23079

HD 23079 b, formally named Guarani, is an exoplanet approximately 109 light years away in the constellation Reticulum. The planet has mass of at least 2.45 Jupiters, although only the minimum mass is known since inclination is unknown. The planet takes almost exactly two years to orbit the star at the average distance of 1.6 AU. The planet's orbital eccentricity is about the same as 109 Piscium b, HD 75898 b, and HD 69830 b at 0.102. The distance range from as close as 1.44 AU to as far away as 1.76 AU from the parent star.

The planet was discovered in 2001 by Tinney et al., who used doppler spectrometer to look for shifts of star's spectrum caused by a gravity of the planet tug the star around as the planet orbits.

The planet HD 23079 b is named Guarani. The name was selected in the NameExoWorlds campaign by Brazil, during the 100th anniversary of the IAU. The planet is named after the Guarani people. HD 63765 and the planet HD 63765 b have names associated with Guarani cosmovision, selected by Bolivia.
