= HD 21749 =

Star in the constellation Reticulum

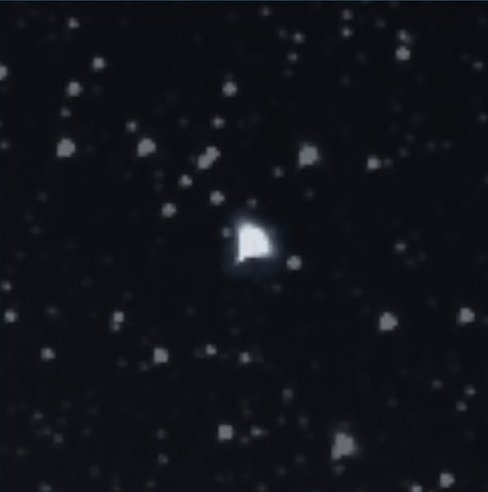
- HD 21749 – star in the constellation Reticulum

Observation data Epoch J2000 Equinox ICRS
- Constellation: Reticulum
- Right ascension: 03^{h} 26^{m} 59.22^{s}
- Declination: −63° 29′ 56.9″
- Apparent magnitude (V): 8.143

Characteristics
- Evolutionary stage: main sequence
- Spectral type: K4.5V
- U−B color index: 1.144
- B−V color index: 1.159

Astrometry
Radial velocity (R_{v})	59.32±0.12 km/s
Proper motion (μ)	RA: +355.20 mas/yr Dec.: −247.39 mas/yr
Parallax (π)	61.2271±0.0150 mas
Distance	53.27 ± 0.01 ly (16.333 ± 0.004 pc)
Absolute magnitude (M_{V})	6.95

Details
Mass	0.73±0.07 M_{☉}
Radius	0.695±0.030 R_{☉}
Luminosity	0.20597±0.00016 L_{☉}
Surface gravity (log g)	4.613+0.052 −0.061 cgs
Temperature	4640±100 K
Metallicity [Fe/H]	0.003±0.060 dex
Rotation	34.1+2.4 −2.7 d
Rotational velocity (v sin i)	1.04 km/s
Age	3.8±3.7 Gyr

Other designations
- CD−63 110, CPD−63 232A, GJ 143, HIP 16069, SAO 248808, WDS J03270-6330A, TYC 8870-01392-1, 2MASS J03265922-6329569, TOI-186

Database references
SIMBAD	data

HD 21749 is a star in the constellation Reticulum. It has an apparent visual magnitude of 8.143, which means it is too dim to be seen with the naked eye. From parallax measurements by the Gaia spacecraft, it is located 53 ly (16 pc) from Earth.

In 2019, it was discovered that the star has two exoplanets: a possibly rocky, mini-Neptune-sized exoplanet named HD 21749 b; and an Earth-sized exoplanet named HD 21749 c. These exoplanets were discovered by the TESS spacecraft.

== Stellar characteristics ==
HD 21749 is a K-type main-sequence star with a spectral type of K4.5V, indicating it is smaller and cooler than the Sun. It is estimated to have a mass of 0.73 M_{☉}, a radius of 0.70 R_{☉}, and a luminosity of 0.20 L_{☉}. Its effective temperature is 4,640 K, which gives the star an orange color typical of K-type stars. Its metallicity—the proportion of elements other than hydrogen and helium—is approximately equal to the Sun's.

This star is moderately active, as shown by its spectral activity indicators and photometric data. These measurements indicate a rotation period of around 30 to 40 days, with a most likely value of 34 days. Stellar activity also creates radial velocity variations, which complicates the measurement of the mass of the planets in the system.

A companion to HD 21749 is listed in double star catalogues, a 9th-magnitude star separated by 22″ in 2015, although decreasing rapidly due to the high proper motion of the primary. The companion is much more distant than the primary and the two are unrelated except being coincidentally in the same line of sight.

== Planetary system ==
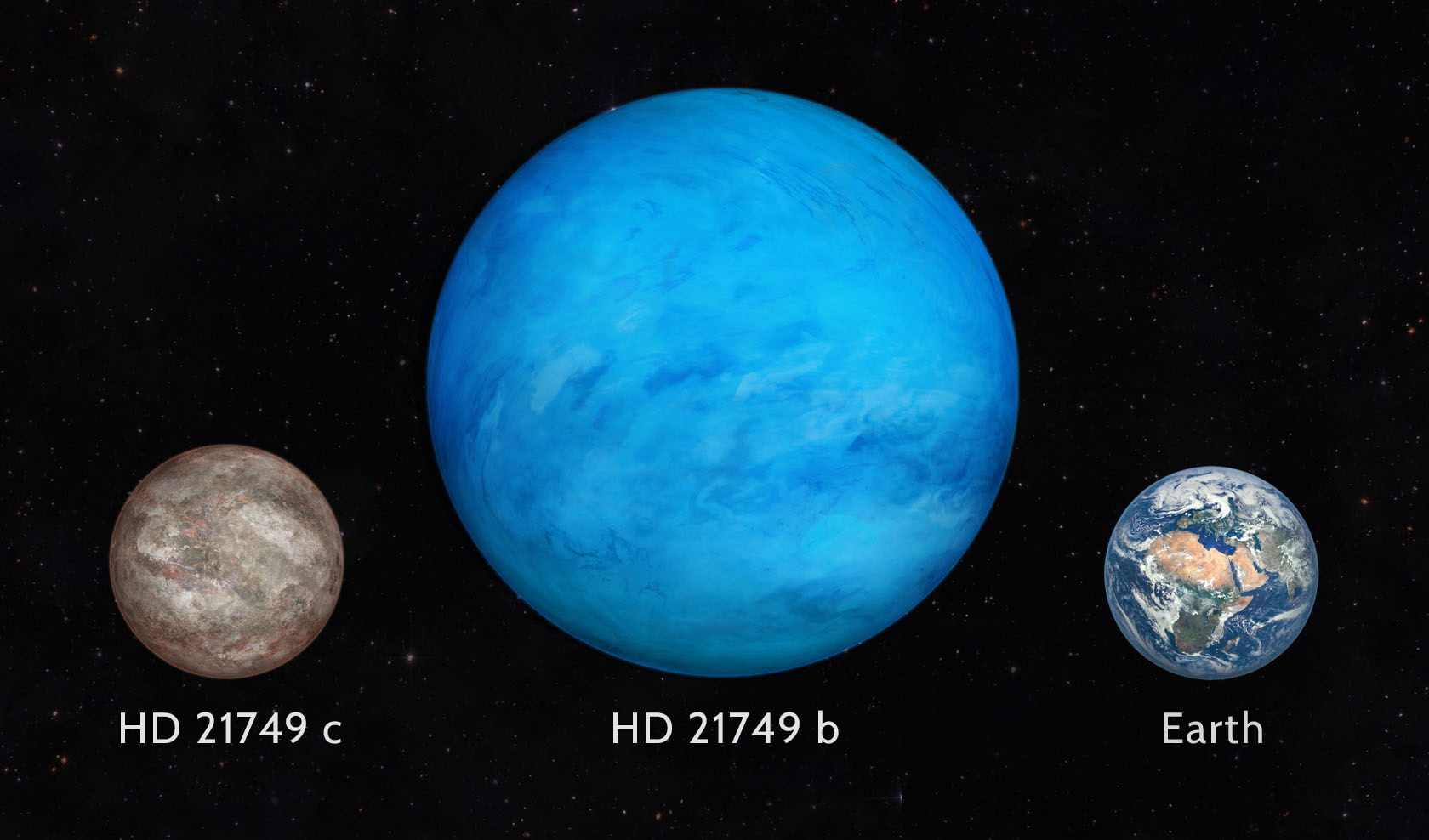
Size comparison of the two known planets of HD 21749 (artistic concept) with Earth

In January 2019, the discovery of an exoplanet around HD 21749 was published. The planet was identified from a single transit event detected by the TESS spacecraft, using data from the first two observation sectors of the mission. Since a single transit is insufficient to determine the orbit of a planet, astronomers used archival radial velocity data from the HARPS spectrograph to detect the planet's signal, which allowed the determination of its orbital period and mass. In April 2019, with two additional months of data from the TESS spacecraft, the orbital period of the planet was confirmed with the observation of new transits, and a second planet was discovered.

=== HD 21749 c ===
The inner planet, HD 21749 c (the second in order of discovery), is orbiting the star at a distance of 0.08 AU with a period of just 7.8 days. A terrestrial planet, it has a radius of 1.1 R_{🜨} and was the first Earth-sized planet found by TESS. Its mass is too low to be calculated with current radial velocity data, with an upper limit of 3.5 M_{🜨}; a probabilistic model estimates it is most likely between 1 and 2 M_{🜨}.

=== HD 21749 b ===
The outer planet, HD 21749 b, orbits the star at a distance of 0.21 AU with a period of 35.6 days. With a mass of 20 M_{🜨} and a radius of 2.9 R_{🜨}, it is similar to Neptune but much denser. Its density of 4.7 g/cm³ suggests it is composed of a substantial rocky core, with a radius of approximately 2.1 R_{🜨}, plus a relatively thick gaseous layer.

The HD 21749 planetary system
Companion (in order from star)	Mass	Semimajor axis (AU)	Orbital period (days)	Eccentricity	Inclination (°)	Radius
c	<3.5 M_{🜨}	0.076±0.008	7.7902+0.0004 −0.0006	0	89.44+0.36 −0.52	1.13+0.11 −0.10 R_{🜨}
b	20.0±2.7 M_{🜨}	0.209+0.022 −0.021	35.6133+0.0005 −0.0006	0.164+0.062 −0.058	89.40+0.07 −0.08	2.86+0.21 −0.20 R_{🜨}
