= HD 25171 =

Star in the constellation Reticulum

Observation data Epoch J2000.0 Equinox J2000.0 (ICRS)
- Constellation: Reticulum
- Right ascension: 03^{h} 55^{m} 49.440^{s}
- Declination: –65° 11′ 12.03″
- Apparent magnitude (V): 7.79

Characteristics
- Spectral type: F8 V
- B−V color index: 0.554

Astrometry
Radial velocity (R_{v})	+42.8 km/s
Proper motion (μ)	RA: +144.020 mas/yr Dec.: +81.550 mas/yr
Parallax (π)	17.928±0.0163 mas
Distance	181.9 ± 0.2 ly (55.78 ± 0.05 pc)
Absolute magnitude (M_{V})	4.09±0.07

Details
Mass	1.09±0.03 M_{☉}
Radius	1.069±0.041 R_{☉}
Luminosity	1.89 L_{☉}
Surface gravity (log g)	4.17±0.1 cgs
Temperature	6,063±50 K
Metallicity [Fe/H]	−0.11±0.04 dex
Rotation	14.4±0.6 d
Rotational velocity (v sin i)	1.0 km/s
Age	4.0±1.6 Gyr

Other designations
- CD–65 199, HD 25171, HIP 9141, SAO 248911

Database references
SIMBAD	data

HD 25171 is a star with an orbiting exoplanet in the southern constellation of Reticulum, the reticle. With an apparent visual magnitude of 7.79, this star is too faint to be viewed with the naked eye. However, it is readily visible through a small telescope from the southern hemisphere. Parallax measurements place it at a distance of roughly 182 light-years (56 parsecs) from Earth. It is drifting further away with a heliocentric radial velocity of +43 km/s.

Based upon its spectrum, this is an ordinary F-type main sequence star with a stellar classification of F8 V. It is slightly larger than the Sun, with 9% more mass and an 7% greater radius. As such, it is radiating 189% of the Sun's luminosity from its outer atmosphere at an effective temperature of 6,063 K. This gives it the yellow-white hued glow of an F-type star. It appears to be roughly the same age as the Sun; around four billion years.

A survey in 2015 ruled out the existence of any stellar companions at projected distances above 26 astronomical units.

== Planetary system ==
The planetary companion was discovered in 2010 with the HARPS instrument, which measured the radial velocity displacement caused by the gravitational perturbation of the star by the planet. This data provided an orbital period of 1,845 days and set a lower bound of the planet's mass at 95% of the mass of Jupiter. The planetary system of HD 25171 is analogous to Solar System in the sense that a gas giant orbiting outside the frost line, far enough to do not destabilize orbits within a circumstellar habitable zone.

The HD 25171 planetary system
Companion (in order from star)	Mass	Semimajor axis (AU)	Orbital period (days)	Eccentricity	Inclination (°)	Radius
b	>0.956±0.234 M_{J}	3.02±0.16	1845±15	0.08±0.06	—	—
