= Theta Doradus =

Star in the constellation Dorado

- Location of θ Doradus (circled)

Observation data Epoch J2000.0 Equinox J2000.0 (ICRS)
- Constellation: Dorado
- Right ascension: 05^{h} 13^{m} 45.456^{s}
- Declination: −67° 11′ 06.930″
- Apparent magnitude (V): +4.82

Characteristics
- Spectral type: K2/3 III CNIb/II
- U−B color index: +1.38
- B−V color index: +1.28

Astrometry
Radial velocity (R_{v})	+10.5±0.8 km/s
Proper motion (μ)	RA: +18.485 mas/yr Dec.: +38.123 mas/yr
Parallax (π)	6.0186±0.1209 mas
Distance	540 ± 10 ly (166 ± 3 pc)
Absolute magnitude (M_{V})	−0.56

Details
Mass	2.23 M_{☉}
Radius	35.6 R_{☉}
Luminosity	427 L_{☉}
Surface gravity (log g)	2.5 cgs
Temperature	4,320±59 K
Metallicity [Fe/H]	−0.16 dex
Rotational velocity (v sin i)	2.2 km/s
Age	1.17 Gyr

Other designations
- θ Dor, Theta Dor, CPD−67°401, FK5 196, HD 34649, HIP 24372, HR 1744, SAO 249225

Database references
SIMBAD	data

Theta Doradus is a solitary star in the southern constellation of Dorado. Its name is a Bayer designation that is Latinized from θ Doradus and abbreviated Theta Dor or θ Dor. With an apparent visual magnitude of +4.82, the star is bright enough to be faintly visible to the naked eye. Based upon an annual parallax shift of 6.02 mas as seen from Earth, it is located at a distance of around 540 light years from the Sun. It is drifting further away with a line of sight velocity component of +10.5 km/s.

This is an evolved orange-hued K-type giant star with a stellar classification of K2/3 III CNIb/II, where the suffix indicates it is a CN star, a cool giant showing unusually strong CN bands in its spectrum. With an age of around 1.17 billion years, it has an estimated 2.23 times the mass of the Sun and has expanded to about 36 times the Sun's radius. It is radiating 427 times the solar luminosity from its photosphere at an effective temperature of 4,320 K.

== Naming ==
In the Chinese astronomical adaptation of the European southern hemisphere constellations, 夾白 (Jiá Bái), meaning White Patches Attached, refers to an asterism consisting of θ Doradus and α Reticuli. Consequently, θ Doradus itself is known as 夾白一 (Jiá Bái yī, English: the First Star of White Patches Attached.)
