= HD 27894 =

Star in the constellation Reticulum

Observation data Epoch J2000.0 Equinox ICRS
- Constellation: Reticulum
- Right ascension: 04^{h} 20^{m} 47.046^{s}
- Declination: −59° 24′ 39.02″
- Apparent magnitude (V): 9.36

Characteristics
- Spectral type: K2 V
- U−B color index: +0.90
- B−V color index: +1.003±0.002

Astrometry
Radial velocity (R_{v})	82.785±0.0008 km/s
Proper motion (μ)	RA: 182.473±0.012 mas/yr Dec.: 270.012±0.017 mas/yr
Parallax (π)	22.8888±0.0121 mas
Distance	142.50 ± 0.08 ly (43.69 ± 0.02 pc)
Absolute magnitude (M_{V})	6.225

Details
Mass	0.83±0.03 M_{☉}
Radius	0.79±0.02 R_{☉}
Luminosity	0.33±0.01 L_{☉}
Surface gravity (log g)	4.56±0.03 cgs
Temperature	4,923±32 K
Metallicity [Fe/H]	+0.30±0.07 dex
Rotation	44 days
Rotational velocity (v sin i)	≤ 1.5 km/s
Age	7.7±2.3 Gyr

Other designations
- CD−59° 829, HD 27894, HIP 20277, LTT 1953

Database references
SIMBAD	data
Exoplanet Archive	data

HD 27894 is a single star with a system of orbiting exoplanets, located in the southern constellation of Reticulum. It is too faint to be seen with the naked eye at an apparent visual magnitude of 9.36. This system lies at a distance of 142.5 light years from the Sun, as determined via parallax measurements, and is drifting further away with a radial velocity of 83 km/s.

The spectrum of HD 27894 presents as a K-type main-sequence star, an orange dwarf, with a stellar classification of K2 V. This is a quiescent solar-type star that displays no significant magnetic activity in its chromosphere and is spinning slowly with a rotation period of roughly 44 days. The abundance of iron in the star is much higher than in the Sun, an indicator that it is metal-rich. It has 83% of the mass of the Sun and 79% of the Sun's radius. The star is radiating 33% of the luminosity of the Sun from its photosphere at an effective temperature of 4,923 K.

== Planetary system ==
In 2005, the Geneva Extrasolar Planet Search Team announced the discovery of an extrasolar planet orbiting the star. In 2017, the discovery of two additional exoplanets was announced. One is very close to the star like the one discovered earlier, while the other one orbits the star at a much larger distance. It is the first system where such a large gap between orbital distances has been found. In 2022, the inclination and true mass of HD 27894 d were measured via astrometry. The study only found strong evidence for planets b and d.

The HD 27894 planetary system
Companion (in order from star)	Mass	Semimajor axis (AU)	Orbital period (days)	Eccentricity	Inclination (°)	Radius
b	≥0.674±0.021 M_{J}	0.1286+0.0019 −0.0020	18.0071±0.0002	0.0334+0.0088 −0.0091	—	—
c	≥0.162+0.011 −0.040 M_{J}	0.198±0.001	36.07+0.26 −0.09	0.015+0.020 −0.002	—	—
d	7.58+0.60 −0.56 M_{J}	5.514±0.084	5,042±19	0.3239+0.0092 −0.0089	117.8+6.9 −11.0	—

== See also ==
- List of extrasolar planets
