= HD 23127 =

Star in the constellation Reticulum

Observation data Epoch J2000.0 Equinox ICRS
- Constellation: Reticulum
- Right ascension: 03^{h} 39^{m} 23.63799^{s}
- Declination: −60° 04′ 40.2386″
- Apparent magnitude (V): +8.576±0.002

Characteristics
- Spectral type: G2V
- B−V color index: 0.701±0.013

Astrometry
Radial velocity (R_{v})	+21.9±1.7 km/s
Proper motion (μ)	RA: 73.621±0.042 mas/yr Dec.: 142.847±0.045 mas/yr
Parallax (π)	10.6258±0.0232 mas
Distance	306.9 ± 0.7 ly (94.1 ± 0.2 pc)
Absolute magnitude (M_{V})	3.62

Details
Mass	1.208±0.045 M_{☉}
Radius	1.490±0.104 R_{☉}
Luminosity	3.01±0.03 L_{☉}
Surface gravity (log g)	4.146±0.054 cgs
Temperature	5,843±52 K
Metallicity [Fe/H]	0.29±0.03 dex
Rotation	~33 days
Age	4.508±0.788 Gyr

Other designations
- CD−60°762, HD 23127, HIP 17054, SAO 248860, TYC 8867-913-1, GSC 08867-00913

Database references
SIMBAD	data

HD 23127 is a star in the southern constellation of Reticulum. With an apparent visual magnitude of +8.58 it is not visible to the naked eye, but can be viewed with a good pair of binoculars. The star is located at a distance of 307 light years from the Sun based on parallax, and is drifting further away with a radial velocity of ~22 km/s. It has an absolute magnitude of 3.62.

This is a G-type main-sequence star with a stellar classification of G2V, which means it is generating energy through core hydrogen fusion. HD 23127 is more massive than the Sun at 1.21 solar masses and has a 49% larger radius. It is metal-rich, having nearly double the abundance of iron in its atmosphere compared to the Sun. This star has an age of 4.5 billion years; about the same as the Sun.

On Friday, February 9, 2007, a 3.32 years period jovian planet was found by using the wobble method by O'Toole and colleagues in Australia. It has minimum mass 53% greater than Jupiter and orbits with a 41% eccentricity. The maximum stable period for a hypothetical inner planet is 322.1 days.

The HD 23127 planetary system
Companion (in order from star)	Mass	Semimajor axis (AU)	Orbital period (days)	Eccentricity	Inclination (°)	Radius
b	≥1.527+0.037 −0.038 M_{J}	2.370±0.032	1,211.17+11.11 −8.91	0.406+0.083 −0.09	—	—

== See also ==
- List of extrasolar planets
