= NGC 1559 =

Galaxy in the constellation Reticulum

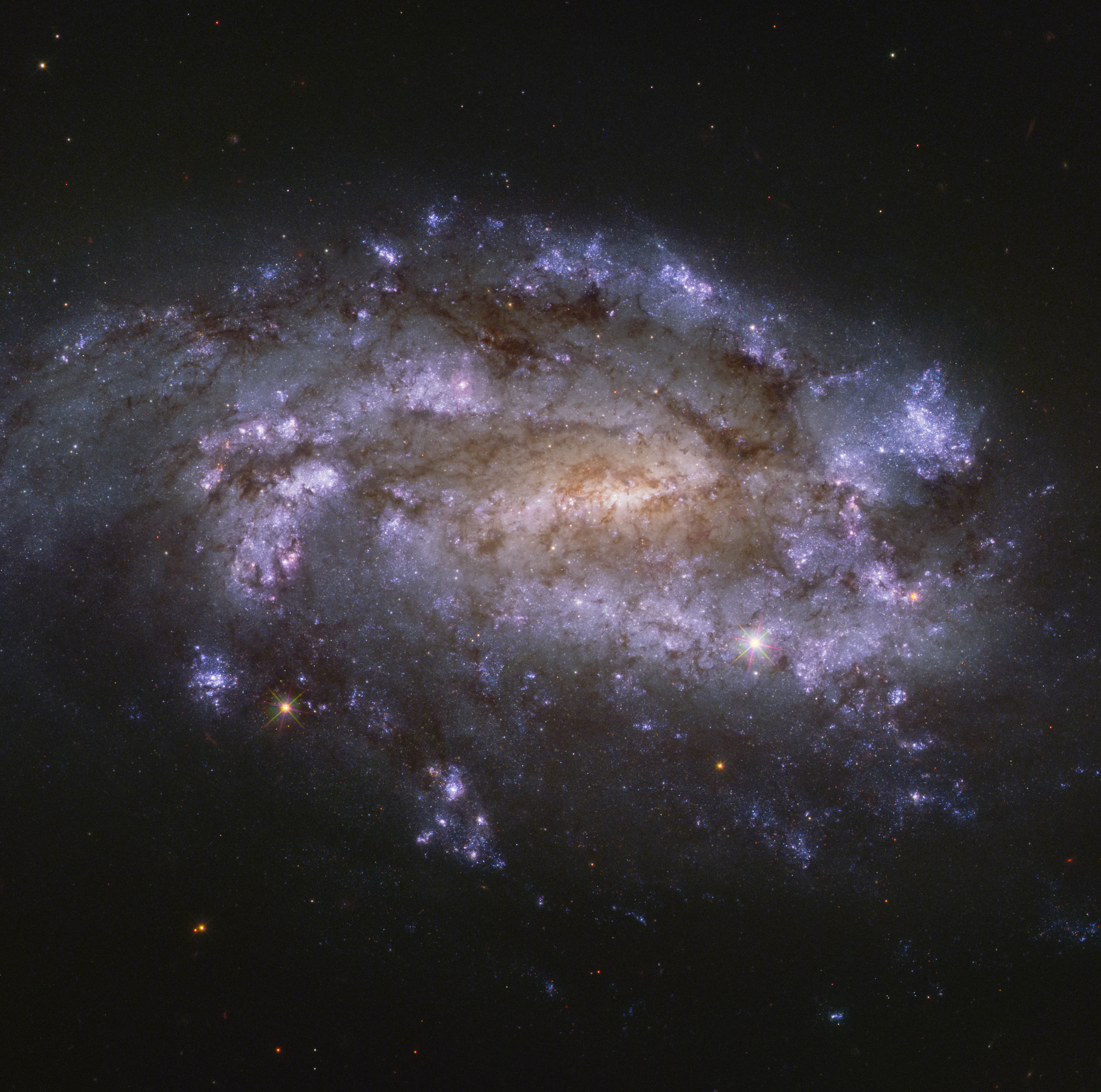
- NGC 1559 imaged by the Hubble Space Telescope

Observation data (J2000.0 epoch)
- Constellation: Reticulum
- Right ascension: 04^{h} 17^{m} 35.7506^{s}
- Declination: −62° 47′ 01.316″
- Redshift: 1304 ± 4 km/s
- Distance: 48.73 ± 2.18 Mly (14.942 ± 0.669 Mpc)
- Apparent magnitude (V): 11

Characteristics
- Type: SB(s)cd
- Size: ~75,600 ly (23.17 kpc) (estimated)
- Apparent size (V): 3.5′ × 2.0′

Other designations
- ESO 084- G 010, IRAS 04170-6253, 2MASX J04173578-6247012, PGC 14814

NGC 1559 is a barred spiral galaxy in the constellation Reticulum. It was discovered on 6 November 1826 by Scottish astronomer James Dunlop.

NGC 1559 is a Seyfert galaxy, i.e. it has a quasar-like nuclei with very high surface brightnesses whose spectra reveal strong, high-ionisation emission lines, but unlike quasars, the host galaxy is clearly detectable. Although it was originally thought to be a member of the Dorado Group, subsequent observations have shown that it is in fact not a member of any galaxy group or cluster and does not have any nearby companions. NGC 1559 has massive spiral arms and strong star formation. It contains a small bar which is oriented nearly east–west and spans 40″. Its bar and disc are the source of very strong radio emissions.

== Supernovae ==
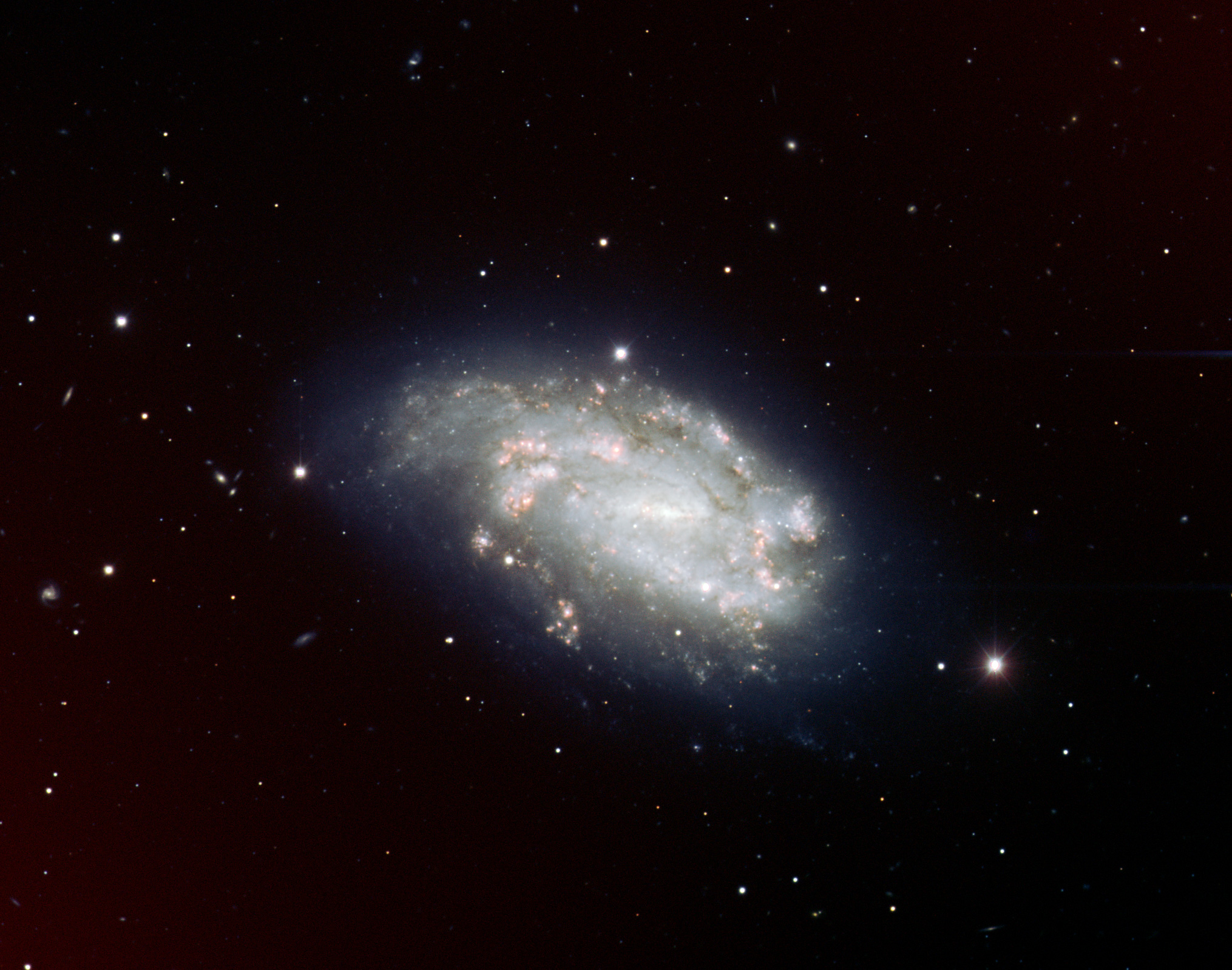
Supernova SN 2005df is visible as the bright star just above the galaxy (imaged by ESO's 8.2m VLT)

Four supernovae have been observed in NGC 1559:

- SN 1984J (Type II, mag. 13.5) was discovered by Australian amateur astronomer Robert Evans on 27 July 1984.
- SN 1986L (Type II, mag. 13.5) was discovered by Robert Evans on 7 October 1986.
- SN 2005df (Type Ia, mag 13.8) was discovered by Robert Evans on 4 August 2005. It got as bright as magnitude 12.3, making it the brightest supernova observed in 2005.
- SN 2009ib (Type II-P, mag. 14.7) was discovered by the CHASE project (CHilean Automatic Supernova sEarch) on 6 August 2009.

== See also ==
- List of NGC objects (1001–2000)
