= Tuppy =

Tuppy is a name. Notable people with this name include:

== Surname ==
- Hans Tuppy (1924–2024), Austrian biochemist and politician

== Given name ==
- Tuppy Diack (1930–2025), New Zealand rugby union player
- Tuppy Ngintja Goodwin (born c. 1952), Aboriginal Australian artist
- Tuppy Owen-Smith (1909–1990), South African cricket player
- Tuppy Owens (1944–2025), English sex therapist

== Fictional characters ==
- Tuppy Glossop
