= R Reticuli =

Variable star in the constellation Reticulum

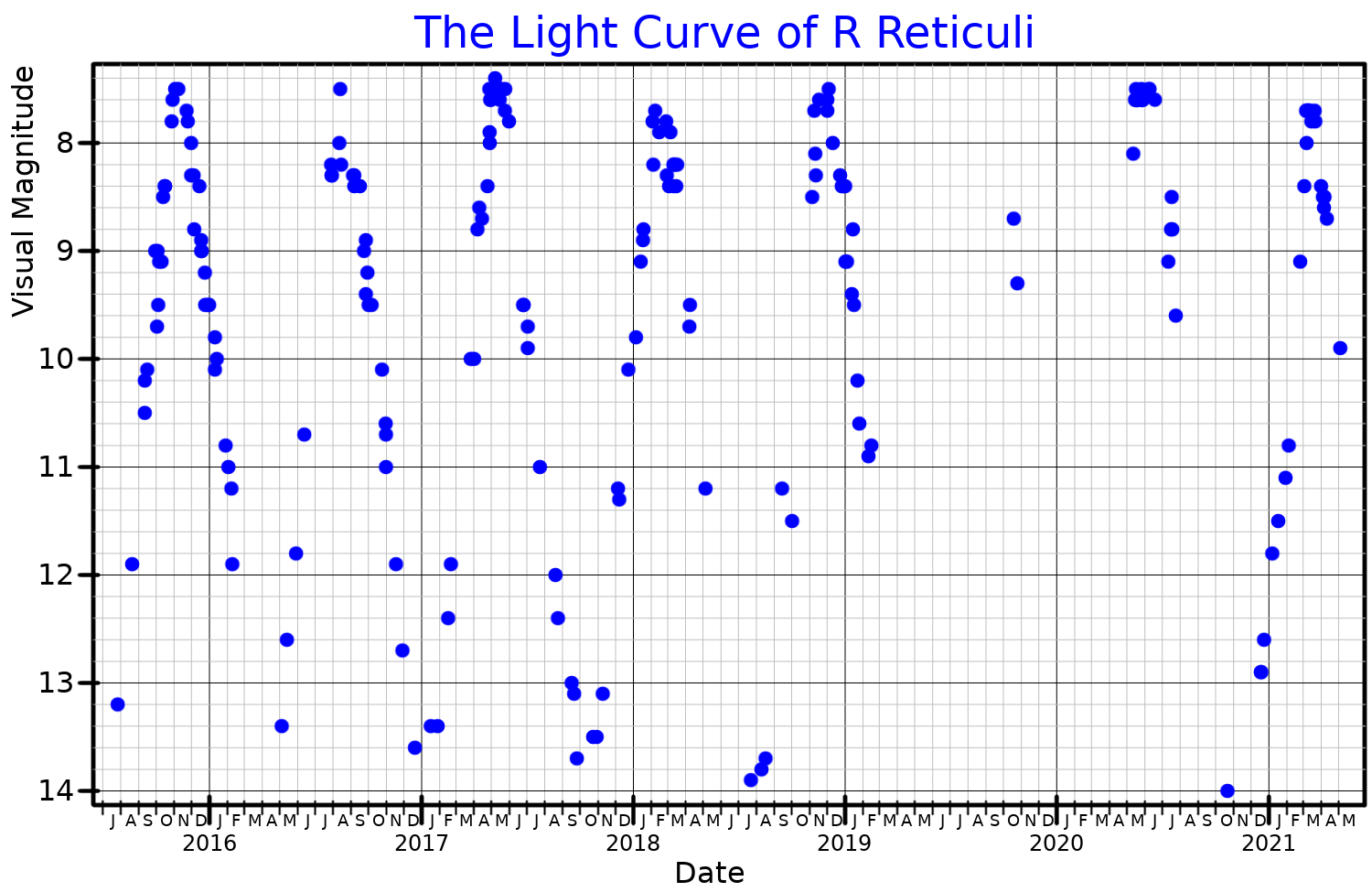
- The visual band light curve of R Reticui, from AAVSO data

Observation data Epoch J2000 Equinox J2000
- Constellation: Reticulum
- Right ascension: 04^{h} 33^{m} 32.83070^{s}
- Declination: −63° 01′ 44.9951″
- Apparent magnitude (V): 6.35 – 14.2

Characteristics
- Evolutionary stage: AGB
- Spectral type: M4e - M7.5e
- B−V color index: 1.099±0.045
- Variable type: Mira

Astrometry
Radial velocity (R_{v})	26.0±4.6 km/s
Proper motion (μ)	RA: +12.111 mas/yr Dec.: +16.384 mas/yr
Parallax (π)	1.3622±0.0492 mas
Distance	2,390 ± 90 ly (730 ± 30 pc)

Details
Mass	0.88+0.04 −0 M_{☉}
Radius	249+21 −34 R_{☉}
Luminosity	7,571±1,671 L_{☉}
Surface gravity (log g)	−0.445 cgs
Temperature	3,410+264 −131 K
Metallicity [Fe/H]	0.55 dex

Other designations
- R Ret, S Ret, HD 29383, HIP 21252, SAO 249053

Database references
SIMBAD	data

R Reticuli, also listed under the duplicate variable star designation S Reticuli, is a Mira variable star in the southern constellation Reticulum. It is an aging red giant star on the asymptotic giant branch with a stellar classification that varies between M4e to M7.5e, being hottest near maximum visual magnitude. The brightness of the star varies between apparent visual magnitudes 6.35 and 14.2 with an average period of 281.08±0.58 d. The mean maximum magnitude is 7.57 and the mean minimum magnitude 13.80.
