= HD 23127 b =

Extrasolar planet in the constellation Reticulum

Discovery
- Discovered by: O'Toole et al.
- Discovery site: Australia
- Discovery date: February 9, 2007
- Detection method: radial velocity

Orbital characteristics
- Semi-major axis: 2.29 AU (343,000,000 km)
- Eccentricity: 0.44 ± 0.07
- Orbital period (sidereal): 1214 ± 9 d 3.32 y
- Time of periastron: 2,400,229 ± 19
- Argument of periastron: 190 ± 6
- Semi-amplitude: 27.5 ± 1
- Star: HD 23127

HD 23127 b is a jovian extrasolar planet orbiting the star HD 23127 at the distance of 2.29 AU, taking 3.32 years to orbit. The orbit is very eccentric, a so-called "eccentric Jupiter". At periastron, the distance is 1.28 AU, and at apastron, the distance is 3.30 AU. The mass is at least 1.37 times Jupiter. Only the minimum mass is known because the inclination is not known.
