= Tupi National High School =

Public high school in South Cotabato, Philippines

Location
- Poblacion; Tupi, South Cotabato; Philippines
- 6°19′44″N 124°57′19″E

Information
- Type: Public National High School
- Motto: Tupi National High School, Takes the Lead!
- Established: 1966
- Principal: Benny M. Toribio
- Grades: 7 to 12
- Color: Maroon

Tupi National High School is a public national high school established in 1966.

The High school changed its name from Tupi Barangay High School when it was converted to a national high school in 1985 through Parliamentary Bill No. 5750.

In 2009, its annex in Barangay Cebuano was separated into an independent national high school called Cebuano National High school through Republic Act 9767.

Over the years, Tupi National High School has established itself as one of the leading public secondary schools in the Municipality of Tupi and the Province of South Cotabato through its academic programs and student achievements in various division, regional, and national competitions.

The school offers several special curricular programs, including the Science, Technology, and Engineering (STE) Program, the Special Program in the Arts (SPA), the Special Program in Sports (SPS), and the Special Program in Foreign Language (SPFL). Students from these programs have represented the Schools Division of South Cotabato in fields such as journalism, robotics, science and technology, accounting, foreign languages, performing arts, and sports.

The school's campus journalists regularly participate in the Division Schools Press Conference (DSPC), Regional Schools Press Conference (RSPC), and National Schools Press Conference (NSPC), representing the municipality and the Schools Division of South Cotabato in various individual and group categories."Conduct of Mobile Journalism Competition for the Upcoming RSPC 2026". Department of Education Schools Division of South Cotabato.

Students under the Science, Technology, and Engineering Program have likewise represented the school in robotics and innovation competitions at the division and regional levels.

The Special Program in the Arts has also gained recognition in cultural and documentary competitions. In 2022, Tupi National High School won first place in the Sinedokyu Mobile Documentary Contest organized by the Arts, Culture, Tourism and Museum Unit of South Cotabato among participating Special Program in the Arts schools in the province."Tupi NHS wins "Sinedokyu" Film Documentary Contest". Province of South Cotabato. 1 June 2022.

Despite being one of the newer programs offered by the school, the Special Program in Foreign Language has earned national recognition through the Department of Education's National Festival of Talents. During the 2024 National Festival of Talents held in Naga City, Cebu, student Kenjie Panganiban placed third in the Lingo Stars: Foreign Language Exposition (Spanish) category."DepEd Memorandum No. 051, s. 2024: Results of the 2024 National Festival of Talents" (PDF). Department of Education. In the following year, Prince Ace Gumpal represented Region XII in the same category during the 2025 National Festival of Talents held in Vigan City, Ilocos Sur, earning national recognition for the school's Spanish program."NFOT 2025: CALABARZON secures back-to-back championship in Vigan". Explained PH.

== Supreme Secondary Learner Government ==
The Supreme Secondary Learner Government (SSLG) is the highest student governing body of Tupi National High School. It serves as the official representative organization of the student body and promotes student leadership, participation in school governance, and the implementation of student-centered programs and activities in accordance with the policies and programs of the Department of Education.

Position	SY 2026–2027	SY 2025–2026
President	Xierra Marie Robleza	Christianne Jugador
Vice President	Queen Ryshah Curay	Ren Ernest Lorenzo
Secretary	Kyle Cedrick Leal Siao	Lyca Gania
Assistant Secretary	—	Rizie Fe Enate
Treasurer	Raine Austria Santos	Linsley Ann Santos
Auditor	Verj Andrew Labuaya	Jeza Maristel Abanes
Assistant Auditor	—	Jeff Ethan Espiritu (Appointed)
Public Information Officer (PIO)	Nazeer Ambod	Sanjo Lanaza
Protocol Officer (PO)	Zian Owell Lazaro	Ivan Christoph Uy
Grade 7 Representatives	—	Priah Khane Marcos, Juriz Loresca
Grade 8 Representatives	Juriz Loresca, Priah Khane Marcos	Andi Infante, Jannah Toñacao
Grade 9 Representatives	Rheana Asperga, Andi Infante	Judi Khoy Tanting, Gethro Jamindang
Grade 10 Representatives	Eugene Rainelle Palate, Judi Khoy Tanting	Xierra Marie Robleza, Chloe Enate
Grade 11 Representatives	Casey Louise Joson, Rheanin Angel Maglasang	Raine Santos, Verj Andrew Labuaya
Grade 12 Representatives	Ester Crizhia Oraning, Ivan Christoph Uy	Krizyl Love Pedregosa, Erinn Juele
