= HD 23079 =

Star in the constellation Reticulum

HD 23079 / Tupi
Observation data Epoch J2000.0 Equinox ICRS
- Constellation: Reticulum
- Right ascension: 03^{h} 39^{m} 43.09600^{s}
- Declination: −52° 54′ 57.0174″
- Apparent magnitude (V): 7.12

Characteristics
- Spectral type: F9.5V
- B−V color index: 0.583±0.009

Astrometry
Radial velocity (R_{v})	+0.648±0.0004 km/s
Proper motion (μ)	RA: −192.838 mas/yr Dec.: −92.021 mas/yr
Parallax (π)	29.8633±0.0194 mas
Distance	109.22 ± 0.07 ly (33.49 ± 0.02 pc)
Absolute magnitude (M_{V})	4.47

Details
Mass	1.01±0.02 M_{☉}
Radius	1.08±0.02 R_{☉}
Luminosity	1.372±0.005 L_{☉}
Surface gravity (log g)	4.37±0.02 cgs
Temperature	6,003±36 K
Metallicity [Fe/H]	−0.12±0.01 dex
Rotation	15.0±2.6 days
Rotational velocity (v sin i)	1.281±0.160 km/s
Age	5.1±1.0 Gyr

Other designations
- Tupi, CD–53°738, GC 4401, HD 23079, HIP 17096, SAO 233208, LTT 1739

Database references
SIMBAD	data
Exoplanet Archive	data

HD 23079, also named Tupi, is a star in the southern constellation of Reticulum. Since the star has an apparent visual magnitude of 7.12, it is not visible to the naked eye, but at least in binoculars it should be easily visible. Parallax measurements give a distance estimate of 109 light-years from the Sun. It is slowly drifting further away with a radial velocity of +0.65 km/s.

This object is an inactive F-type main sequence star with a stellar classification of F9.5V; in between F8 and G0. This indicates it is generating energy through core hydrogen fusion. The star is similar to the Sun, but is slightly hotter and more massive. It is about 5.1 billion years old and it is spinning slowly with a projected rotational velocity of 1.3 km/s. The metallicity of this star is below solar, meaning the abundance of elements other than hydrogen and helium is lower than in the Sun.

== Nomenclature ==
This was one of the systems selected to be named in the 2019 NameExoWorlds campaign during the 100th anniversary of the IAU, which assigned each country a star and planet to be named. This system was assigned to Brazil. The approved names were Tupi for the star and Guarani for planet b, named after the Tupi and Guarani indigenous peoples of Brazil.

== Planetary system ==
In October 2001, a giant planet orbiting the star was announced, detected by the radial velocity method. The orbit of this object is similar to that of Mars, and the presence of such a large planet would have a strong impact on an Earth-like planet in the habitable zone of this Star. Any Earthlike planet would have to exist either as an exomoon or Trojan planet of HD 23079 b.

With additional observations, the discovery of a second planet, HD 23079 c, was announced in 2025. This is a sub-Neptune mass planet orbiting closer to the star, with a period of only 5.75 days.

The HD 23079 planetary system
Companion (in order from star)	Mass	Semimajor axis (AU)	Orbital period (days)	Eccentricity	Inclination (°)	Radius
c	≥8.1±0.8 M_{🜨}	—	5.74894+0.00022 −0.00021	0.07+0.09 −0.05	—	—
b / Guarani	≥2.66±0.05 M_{J}	1.586±0.003	735.7±0.4	0.072+0.012 −0.011	—	—
