= Murder of Daniel Tupý =

2005 murder in Bratislava, Slovakia

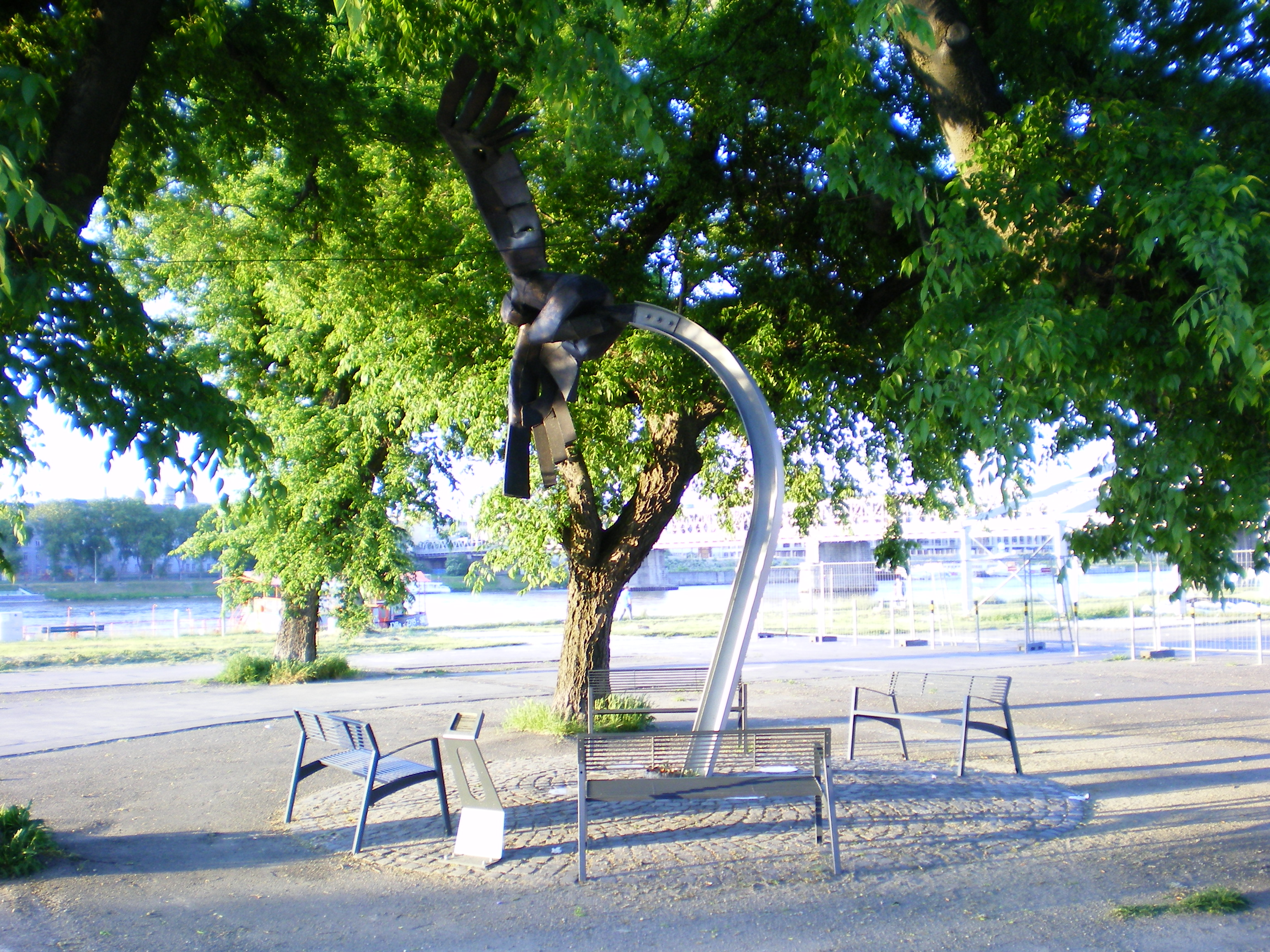
The monument erected in memory of Daniel Tupý. The inscription says: "At this place on 4 november 2005. Daniel Tupý, a student of the Faculty of Philosophy at Comenius University was murdered"

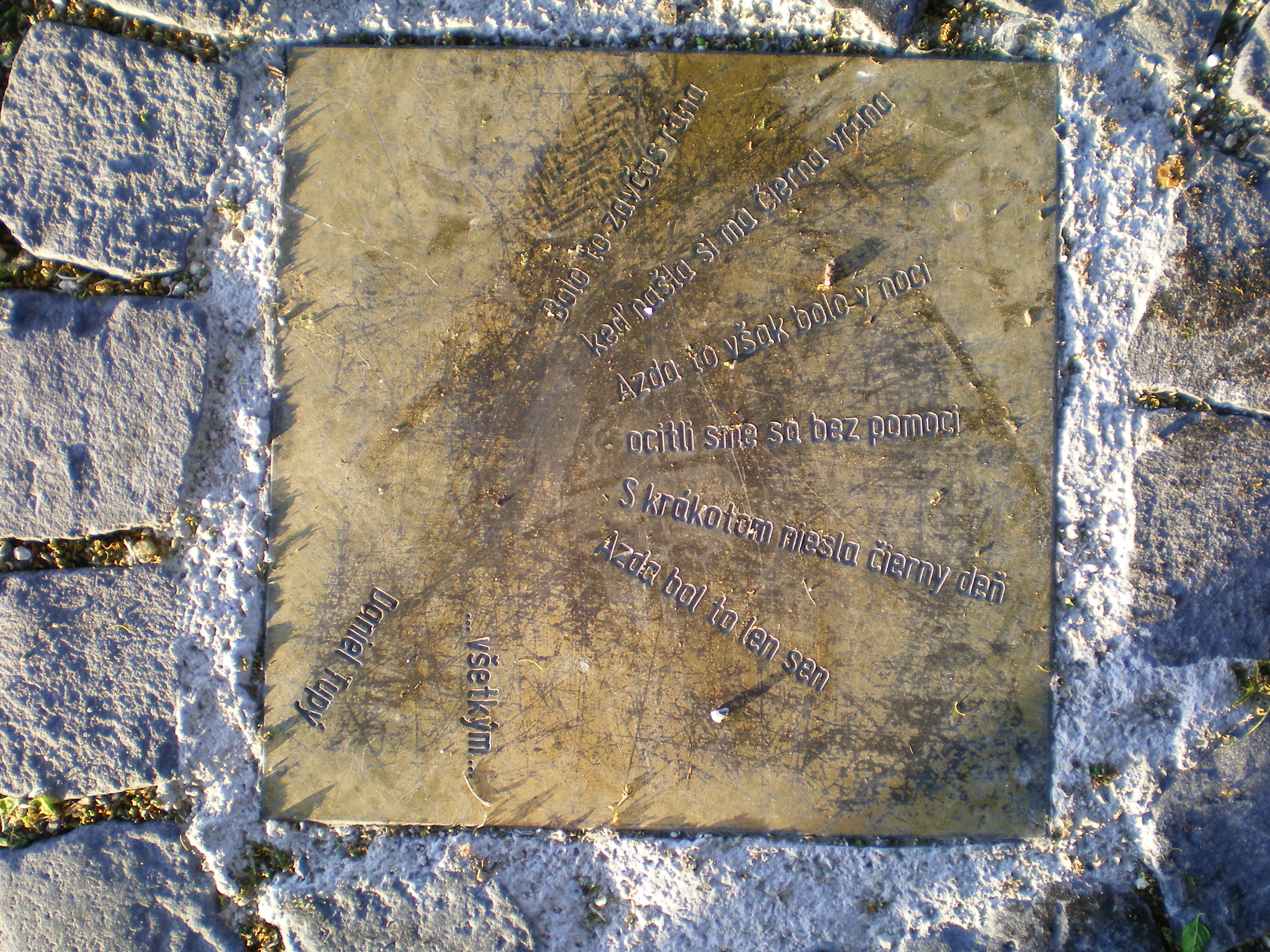
A poem engraved into a piece of metal as part of the Daniel Tupý memorial. It was early in the morning, when a black raven was prowling Maybe it was in the darkness, we found ourselves helpless It brought a new day croaking, "it was a dream" were we hoping...for all of us Daniel Tupý

Daniel Tupý (1984 in Žilina – November 4, 2005 in Petržalka, Bratislava) was a Slovak university student from Žilina. His violent death shocked the Slovak media and public, and aimed the public attention at the violence and growing dangers of the various Slovak extremist groups.

== Life ==
Tupý was born and raised in Žilina. After graduating from high school, he entered the Comenius University and moved to Bratislava.

== Death ==
On November 4, 2005, Tupý was with his friends at the Tyršovo embankment of the Danube in Petržalka when a group of neo-Nazis suddenly attacked them from behind. During the attack Tupý suffered multiple stabs in the back, and he was pronounced dead upon arrival at a hospital. His friends were assaulted and beaten; they fully recovered later. The true cause of the attack was never clarified, however multiple witnesses said that neo-Nazis attacked them because Tupý (being a rocker) had long hair, black clothes, and a guitar with him. The media attention made resolving the case the top priority of the Slovak police; however his attackers were not identified. The police claimed that they knew who the perpetrators were, but that they had insufficient evidence to arrest them.

On the first anniversary of his death, Comenius University edited his poems into a book, which they titled Ticho po anjelovi ("Silence after the angel"). The Slovak interior minister, Robert Kaliňák held a speech, where he claimed that the "perpetrators can not feel safe themselves". Concerts were also organized and held to commemorate his death. A memorial to the victims of racism and neo-Nazism was also erected, and unveiled at Bratislava's Tyršovo embankment on November 16, at the site of the murder. Numerous mass marches against racism were also held throughout November in Bratislava, Košice, Zvolen and Prešov, and more have been held since.

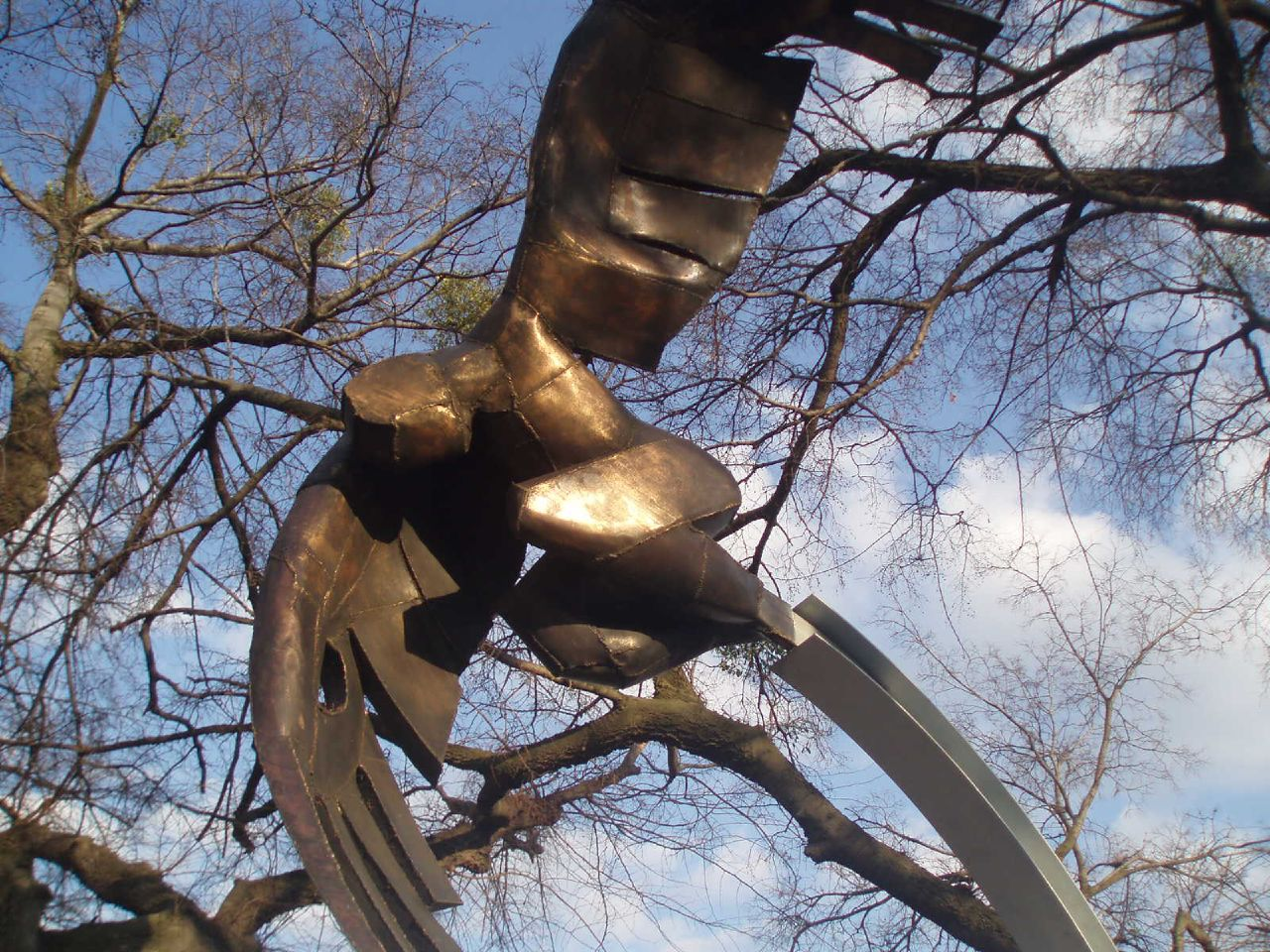
Part of the Daniel Tupy Memorial, marking the location of his murder

After three years of investigation, on February 27, 2008, three neo-Nazis were arrested for murdering Daniel. A fourth suspect was also sought, but he had committed suicide some time before the arrests. The number of suspects quickly rose to six. An unrevealed witness confessed in April 2008 that one of the suspects committed the murder, attacking Tupý from behind with two knives in his hand. The witness also claimed that Tupý's friends were attacked by at least six other neo-Nazis. The five living suspects were arrested in a local bar, from where they often went to "clean up" the neighbourhood. One of them was later allegedly linked to the Bratislava mafia.

The statistics in 2005 showed a number of (at least) 121 crimes as "racially or ethnically motivated" or "motivated by some extremist cause", and 82 were resolved. 25 of them were actual physical abuse, including Tupý and his friends' case. Such attacks are mainly targeted at Romani people, however the other minorities, most commonly the Hungarians have also fallen victims of such attacks. The most recent racially motivated attack, which gained huge media attention and eventually affected Slovak-Hungarian relations, was Hedvig Malina's case.

== See also ==
- Crime in Slovakia

== Literature ==
- Tupý, Daniel: "Ticho po anjelovi", Bratislava, Univerzita Komenského, 2006, ISBN 80-223-2257-1 (63 pages, posthumus)

== Sources ==
- Szlovák emlékművet avatnak a szélsőségek áldozatainak, Találjuk ki Közép-Európát?, 2005 (Hungarian)
- Rok po smrti Daniela Tupého vychádza kniha jeho veršov, SME.sk, October 30, 2006 (Slovak)
- Uplynul rok od zavraždenia Daniela Tupého, Bleskovsky, November 11, 2006 (Slovak)
- Kaliňák: Tupého vrahovia sa nemôžu cítiť bezpečne, SME.sk, November 4, 2006 (Slovak)
- Letartóztatták Daniel Tupý gyilkosait Bumm.sk, February 27, 2008 (Hungarian)
- Culture shocks, The Slovak Spectator, November 27, 2006 (English)
- Neo-Nazis won't just go away, Slovak Spectator, October 15, 2007 (English)
- Daniel Tupý gyilkosa tanúként vallott egy másik gyilkosságban, parameter.sk, April 24, 2008 (Hungarian)
- Four accused in student's slaying, The Slovak Spectator, March 3, 2008 (English)
- Three youths charged in murder of Daniel Tupý, The Slovak Spectator, March 18, 2008 (English)
- Mafia man may be behind Tupý murder, The Slovak Spectator, February 28, 2008 (English)
- Tupý's commemorating page on his former high school's webpage, pictures of him and his funeral. (Slovak)
