= Beta Reticuli =

Star in the constellation Reticulum

- Location of β Reticuli (circled)

Observation data Epoch J2000.0 Equinox J2000.0 (ICRS)
- Constellation: Reticulum
- Right ascension: 03^{h} 44^{m} 11.97587^{s}
- Declination: −64° 48′ 24.8610″
- Apparent magnitude (V): +3.84

Characteristics
- Spectral type: K2-IIIb
- U−B color index: +1.11
- B−V color index: +1.13

Astrometry
| Radial velocity (R_{v}) | 51.1±4.1 km/s |
| Proper motion (μ) | RA: +307.13 mas/yr Dec.: +77.50 mas/yr |
| Parallax (π) | 32.22±0.46 mas |
| Distance | 101 ± 1 ly (31.0 ± 0.4 pc) |
| Absolute magnitude (M_{V}) | +1.46±0.03 |

Orbit
| Period (P) | 1,918.31±0.73 d |
| Semi-major axis (a) | 27.8±0.46 mas |
| Eccentricity (e) | 0.33461±0.00035 |
| Inclination (i) | 82.85±3.0° |
| Longitude of the node (Ω) | 16±4.4° |
| Periastron epoch (T) | 2452806.14 ± 0.33 |
| Argument of periastron (ω) (secondary) | 42.023±0.084° |
| Semi-amplitude (K_{1}) (primary) | 5.1235±0.0025 km/s |

Details

β Ret A
| Mass | 1.2±0.2 M_{☉} |
| Radius | 9.3±0.4 R_{☉} |
| Temperature | 4,580±80 K |
| Age | 5–6 Gyr |

β Ret B
| Mass | 0.4±0.1 M_{☉} |

Other designations
- β Ret, CPD−65°263, FK5 141, HD 23817, HIP 17440, HR 1175, SAO 248877, WDS J03442-6448A

Database references
| SIMBAD | data |

Beta Reticuli (Beta Ret, β Reticuli, β Ret) is binary star system in southern constellation of Reticulum. It is visible to the naked eye with an apparent visual magnitude of +3.84. Based upon an annual parallax shift of 32.22 mas, it is located at a distance of 101.0 light-years (31.0 parsecs).

This is a single-lined spectroscopic binary with an orbital period of 5.25 years and an eccentricity of 0.33. The primary, component A, is an evolved K-type giant star with a stellar classification of K2-IIIb. It is between 5 and 6 billion years old, with 1.2 times the mass of the Sun and 9.3 times the Sun's radius. The companion, component B, is most likely a red dwarf with a classification in the range M0–M4.

During the mid-20th century, the Dutch-American astronomer Willem Jacob Luyten proposed that the G3V star HD 24293 formed a third component of this system, based upon similar proper motions. However, this was subsequently ruled out based on more accurate measurements, since their actual distances, radial velocities, and proper motions do not match.

Beta Reticuli is moving through the Galaxy at a speed of 69.2 km/s relative to the Sun. Its projected Galactic orbit carries it between 10,100 and 24,200 light years from the center of the Galaxy. Beta Reticuli came closest to the Sun 319,000 years ago when it had brightened to magnitude 2.98 from a distance of 67 light years.

== Naming ==
In Chinese caused by adaptation of the European southern hemisphere constellations into the Chinese system, 蛇首 (Shé Shǒu), meaning Snake's Head, refers to an asterism consisting of β Reticuli and α Hydri. Consequently, β Reticuli itself is known as 蛇首二 (Shé Shǒu èr, English: the Second Star of Snake's Head.)
