= Boleslav Jablonský =

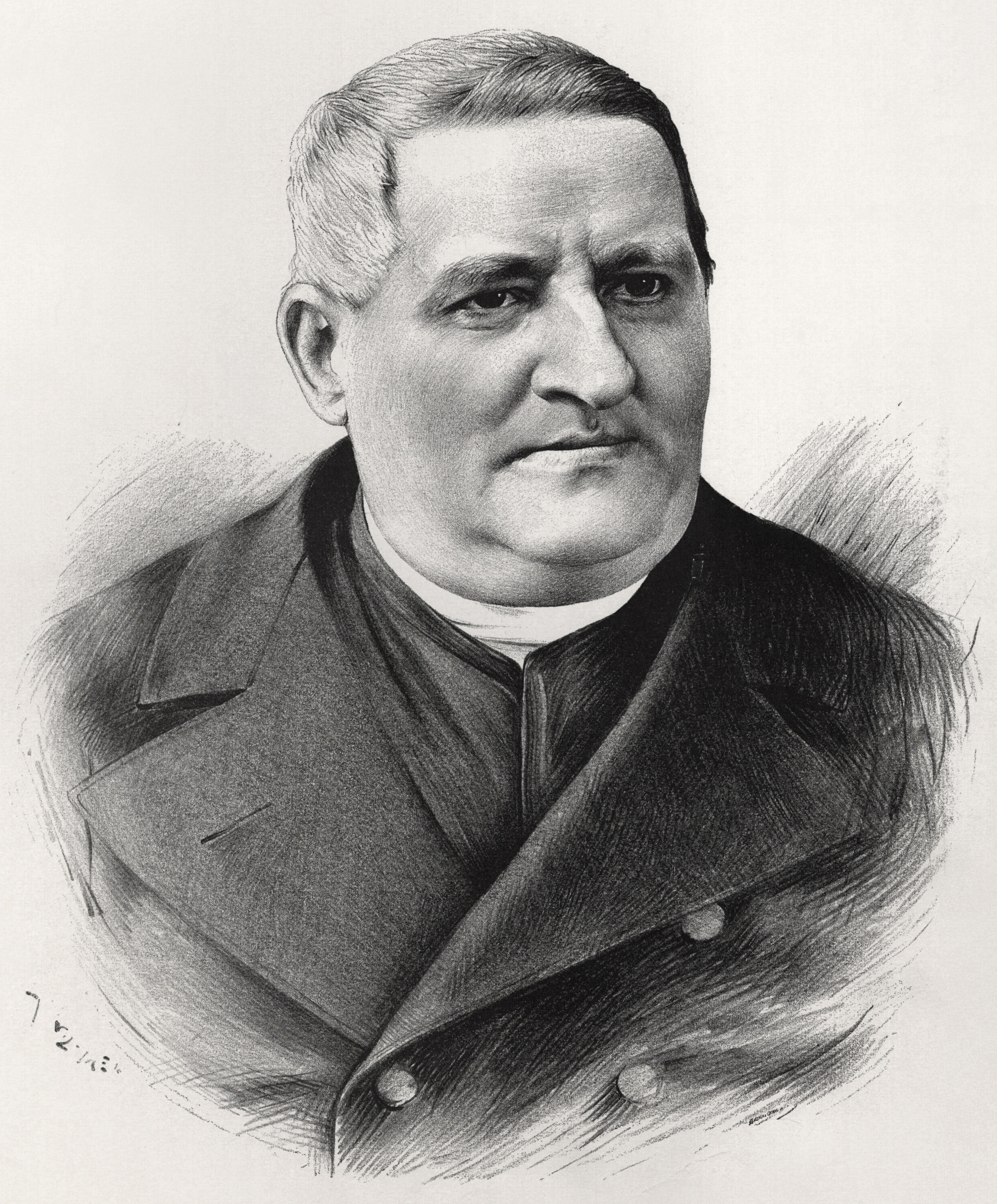
- Boleslav Jablonský
- Born: Karel Eugen Tupý; 14 January 1813; Kardašova Řečice
- Died: 27 February 1881 (aged 68); Kraków-Zwierzyniec
- Occupations: poet, Catholic priest
- Known for: Salomo

Boleslav Jablonský (real name Karel Eugen Tupý) (14 January 1813 in Kardašova Řečice – 27 February 1881 in Kraków-Zwierzyniec) was a Czech poet and Catholic priest.

Although Jablonský studied theology, he was one of the most popular Czech poets in the 19th century, whose songs (Písně milosti) found international renown.

One of his popular poems was Salomo or the wisdom of the father (Salomon neboli Moudrost otcova). A compilation of his poems (Básně) was published in 1872.

He is buried at the Vyšehrad Cemetery in Prague.
