= Reticulum =

Constellation in the southern celestial hemisphere

- Constellation
- List of stars in Reticulum
- Abbreviation: Ret
- Genitive: Reticuli
- Pronunciation: /rɪˈtɪkjʊləm/, genitive /rɪˈtɪkjʊlaɪ/
- Symbolism: the Reticle
- Right ascension: 03^{h} 13^{m} 27.0455^{s}–04^{h} 37^{m} 05.8883^{s}
- Declination: −52.7470779°–−67.2479248°
- Quadrant: SQ1
- Area: 114 sq. deg. (82nd)
- Main stars: 4
- Bayer/Flamsteed stars: 11
- Stars with planets: 7
- Stars brighter than 3.00^{m}: 0
- Stars within 10.00 pc (32.62 ly): 2
- Brightest star: α Ret (Rhombus) (3.33^{m})
- Nearest star: WISE 0350−5658
- Messier objects: none
- Bordering constellations: Horologium; Dorado; Hydrus
- Visible at latitudes between +23° and −90°. Best visible at 21:00 (9 p.m.) during the month of December.

Reticulum is a small, faint constellation in the southern sky. Its name is Latin for a small net, or reticle—a net of crosshairs at the focus of a telescope eyepiece that is used to measure star positions. The constellation is best viewed between October and December, and save for one main star visible in ideal conditions, cannot be seen from north of the 30th parallel north.

== History ==
A constellation in this area was introduced by Isaac Habrecht II in his celestial globe in 1621, who named it Rhombus. It was replaced with a somewhat different constellation by the French astronomer Nicolas Louis de Lacaille in the eighteenth century; during his stay at the Cape of Good Hope, he named the constellation le Réticule Rhomboide to commemorate the reticle in his telescope eyepiece. The name was later Latinized to Reticulum in his star catalogue Coelum Australe Stelliferum. In 1810, the stars of Reticulum were used by William Croswell to produce the constellation Marmor Sculptile, which represented the bust of Christopher Columbus, but this did not catch on among astronomers.

The constellation Reticulum became officially recognized during the First General Assembly of the International Astronomical Union in 1922. The boundary for this and other constellations was drawn up by Belgian astronomer Eugène Delporte along arcs of right ascension and declination for epoch 1875. These were published in 1930 in the Delimination Scientifique des Constellations at the behest of the IAU.

== Features ==
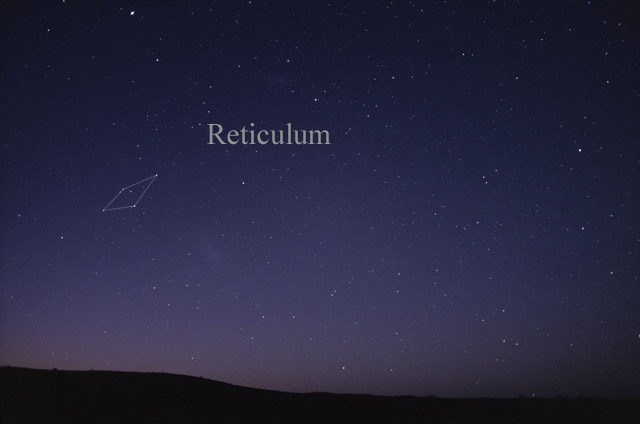
The constellation of Reticulum, the net, as it can be seen by the naked eye

Lacaille gave 10 stars Bayer designations Alpha through Iota in 1756 and labelled two stars as Zeta. In 1879, Benjamin Gould added Kappa Reticuli as he felt the star was bright enough to warrant a name.

Only two of the stars in this constellation are brighter than visual magnitude 5: Alpha (α) (the proper name is Rhombus since 19 September 2024) and Beta (β) reticuli. The reddish star R Reticuli is a Mira variable. This variable was discovered by C. Ragoonatha Chary at the Madras Observatory in India.

The binary star system Epsilon Reticuli consists of a spectral class K2IV star being orbited by a white dwarf. Based on parallax measurements, this system is located about 50 light years from the Sun. In 2000, a planetary companion was announced, orbiting the star ε Reticuli A.

Zeta Reticuli is a wide binary star system, with both members being similar to the Sun. It is located at a distance of about 39 light years. This system gained some notoriety in ufology when the alleged alien abductees Betty and Barney Hill named it as the home of their abductors.

In 2005, a type Ia supernova was discovered in the spiral galaxy NGC 1559, located in the constellation.

The dwarf galaxy Reticulum II is enriched in r-process heavy elements.

The Horologium-Reticulum Supercluster is a galaxy supercluster that ranges from 700 million to 1.2 billion light-years from Earth.

== See also ==
- Reticulum (Chinese astronomy)
