= Tau Persei =

Star in the constellation Perseus

τ Persei
- Location of τ Persei (circled)

Observation data Epoch J2000 Equinox ICRS
- Constellation: Perseus
- Right ascension: 02^{h} 45^{m} 15.46108^{s}
- Declination: +52° 45′ 44.9240″
- Apparent magnitude (V): 3.94 - 4.07

Characteristics
- U−B color index: +0.46
- B−V color index: +0.74
- Variable type: Algol

τ Per A
- Spectral type: G8 IIIa
- U−B color index: +0.68
- B−V color index: +0.91

τ Per B
- Spectral type: A3-4 V
- U−B color index: +0.07
- B−V color index: +0.15

Astrometry
Radial velocity (R_{v})	2.2 ± 0.7 km/s
Proper motion (μ)	RA: −1.26 mas/yr Dec.: −4.37 mas/yr
Parallax (π)	12.83±0.36 mas
Distance	254 ± 7 ly (78 ± 2 pc)
Absolute magnitude (M_{V})	−0.65 −0.45 / 1.26

Orbit
Period (P)	4.149 yr
Semi-major axis (a)	0.055
Eccentricity (e)	0.728
Inclination (i)	94.5°
Longitude of the node (Ω)	100.6°
Periastron epoch (T)	B 2013.888
Argument of periastron (ω) (secondary)	54.1°

Details

τ Per A
Mass	2.99 ± 0.10 M_{☉}
Radius	16.08 ± 0.54 R_{☉}
Luminosity	191 L_{☉}
Surface gravity (log g)	2.47 ± 0.03 cgs
Temperature	5507 ± 83 K
Metallicity [Fe/H]	−0.20 ± 0.03 dex
Age	0.39 ± 0.05 Gyr

τ Per B
Mass	1.8 M_{☉}
Radius	2.2 R_{☉}
Temperature	8970 ± 150 K

Other designations
- 18 Per, BD+52°641, HD 17878, HD 17879, HIP 13531, HR 854, SAO 23685

Database references
SIMBAD	data

Tau Persei (τ Per), also known as 18 Persei, is a binary star in the constellation of Perseus. The system is fairly close, and is located about 254 light-years (78 parsecs) away, based on its parallax.

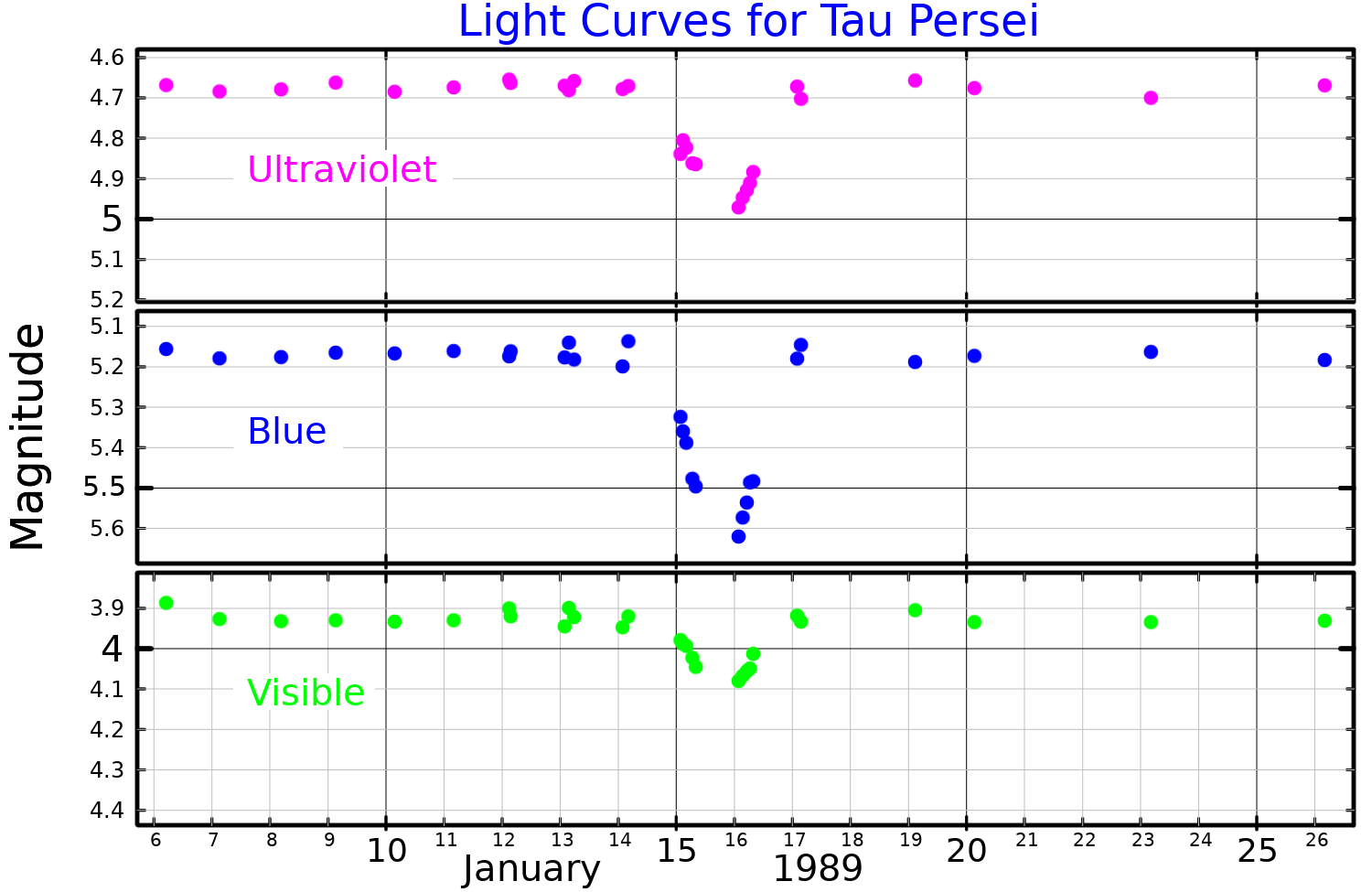
Light curves for the 1989 eclipse of Tau Persei, plotted from data published by Schmidtke and Hopkins (1990)

Tau Persei is an eclipsing binary, which means the two stellar components orbit each other in such an orientation that they periodically eclipse each other, while blocking the other's light. Unlike many eclipsing binaries that have short orbital periods, Tau Persei has an orbital period of 4.15 years. With a semi-major axis of 0.055 arcseconds, this is one of the few eclipsing binaries whose components can be resolved with interferometry.

The primary component of Tau Persei is a red giant with a spectral type of G8III. It has a radius 16 times that of the Sun, and is about 390 million years old. Its companion is an A-type main-sequence star. In 1989, the primary star eclipsed the secondary, allowing for the stellar parameters to be derived via its light curve.

== Naming ==
In Chinese, 大陵 (Dà Líng), meaning Mausoleum, refers to an asterism consisting of τ Persei, 9 Persei, ι Persei, κ Persei, β Persei, ρ Persei, 16 Persei and 12 Persei. Consequently, the Chinese name for τ Persei itself is 大陵二 (Dà Líng èr, English: the Second Star of Mausoleum.).
