= Zeta Herculis =

Multiple star system in the constellation Hercules

- Location of ζ Herculis (circled)

Observation data Epoch J2000 Equinox ICRS
- Constellation: Hercules
- Right ascension: 16^{h} 41^{m} 17.16104^{s}
- Declination: +31° 36′ 09.7873″
- Apparent magnitude (V): 2.81

Characteristics
- Spectral type: F9 IV + G7 V
- U−B color index: +0.21
- B−V color index: +0.65
- Variable type: Suspected

Astrometry
Radial velocity (R_{v})	–68.43 km/s
Proper motion (μ)	RA: –461.52 mas/yr Dec.: +342.28 mas/yr
Parallax (π)	93.32±0.47 mas
Distance	35.0 ± 0.2 ly (10.72 ± 0.05 pc)
Absolute magnitude (M_{V})	2.65
Absolute bolometric magnitude (M_{bol})	2.699 / 5.254

Orbit
Period (P)	34.45 yr
Semi-major axis (a)	1.33″
Eccentricity (e)	0.46
Inclination (i)	131°
Longitude of the node (Ω)	50°
Periastron epoch (T)	1967.7
Argument of periastron (ω) (secondary)	111°

Details

ζ Her A
Mass	1.45±0.01 M_{☉}
Radius	2.76±0.02 R_{☉}
Luminosity	7.372±0.080 L_{☉}
Surface gravity (log g)	3.72±0.03 cgs
Temperature	5,760±96 K
Metallicity [Fe/H]	+0.04±0.03 dex
Rotational velocity (v sin i)	4.8 km/s
Age	6.2 Gyr

ζ Her B
Mass	0.98±0.02 M_{☉}
Radius	0.915–0.920 R_{☉}
Luminosity	0.62±0.06 L_{☉}
Temperature	5,300±150 K

Other designations
- Tianji, ζ Her, 40 Her, BD+31 2884, GJ 635, HD 150680, HIP 81693, HR 6212, SAO 65485, ADS 10157 AB, WDS J16413+3136AB, LHS 3234, LTT 14952

Database references
SIMBAD	data

Zeta Herculis, Latinized from ζ Herculis, formally named Tianji, is a binary star system in the constellation Hercules. It has a combined apparent visual magnitude of 2.81, which is readily visible to the naked eye. Parallax measurements put it at a distance of about 35.0 light-years (10.7 parsecs) from Earth.

The primary member is a subgiant star that is somewhat larger than the Sun and has just begun to evolve away from the main sequence as the supply of hydrogen at its core becomes exhausted. It is orbited by a smaller companion star at a mean angular separation of 1.5 arcseconds, which corresponds to a physical separation of about 15 Astronomical Units. This distance is large enough so that the two stars do not have a significant tidal effect on each other. The stars orbit each other over a period of 34.45 years, with a semi-major axis of 1.33" and an eccentricity of 0.46.

Component A has a stellar classification of F9 IV. It has about 2.7 times the radius of the Sun and 1.45 times the Sun's mass. This star is radiating more than seven times the luminosity of the Sun at an effective temperature of 5,760 K. The secondary component (Component B) is about the same size and mass as the Sun, with an effective temperature of 5,300 K. Both stars are rotating slowly. There may be a faint third member of this system, although little is known about it.

The dual nature of this system was reported by F. G. W. Struve in 1826. The pair orbit each other with a period of 34.45 years and an eccentricity of 0.46. The magnitude difference between the A-B pair is 1.52 ± 0.04 magnitudes (at 700 nm). Two astrometric studies have failed to detect a third component to the A-B binary.

This system forms part of the Zeta Herculis moving group of stars. This group includes: φ^{2} Pavonis, ζ Reticuli, 1 Hydrae, Gl 456, Gl 678, and GJ 9079.

In Chinese astronomy, 天紀 (Tiān Jì), meaning Celestial Discipline, refers to an asterism consisting of ζ Herculis, ξ Coronae Borealis, ε Herculis, 59 Herculis, 61 Herculis, 68 Herculis, HD 160054 and θ Herculis. Consequently, the Chinese name for ζ Herculis itself is 天紀二 (Tiān Jì èr, English: the Second Star of Celestial Discipline). The IAU Working Group on Star Names adopted the name Tianji for Zeta Herculis A on 14 May 2026, after this Chinese constellation. Tianji (with different meanings) is also the Chinese name of the stars Phecda and λ Velorum (Suhail).
