= Iota Persei =

Main sequence star in the constellation Perseus

- Location of ι Persei (circled)

Observation data Epoch J2000 Equinox J2000
- Constellation: Perseus
- Right ascension: 03^{h} 09^{m} 04.019^{s}
- Declination: +49° 36′ 47.80″
- Apparent magnitude (V): 4.062

Characteristics
- Evolutionary stage: Main sequence
- Spectral type: G0V or F9.5 V
- U−B color index: +0.119
- B−V color index: +0.595

Astrometry
| Radial velocity (R_{v}) | 49.47±0.12 km/s |
| Proper motion (μ) | RA: +1,265.475 mas/yr Dec.: −91.50 mas/yr |
| Parallax (π) | 94.5412±0.1448 mas |
| Distance | 34.50 ± 0.05 ly (10.58 ± 0.02 pc) |
| Absolute magnitude (M_{V}) | 3.94 |

Details
| Mass | 1.08 – 1.1 M_{☉} |
| Radius | 1.383±0.018 R_{☉} |
| Luminosity | 2.02±0.11 L_{☉} |
| Surface gravity (log g) | 4.05±0.09 cgs |
| Temperature | 5,849±72 K |
| Metallicity [Fe/H] | +0.09 dex |
| Rotational velocity (v sin i) | 4.1 km/s |
| Age | 3.2–4.1 Gyr |

Other designations
- ι Per, BD+49°857, FK5 112, GC 3740, GJ 124, HD 19373, HIP 14632, HR 937, SAO 38597, PPM 45875, CCDM J03091+4936A, WDS J03091+4937A

Database references
| SIMBAD | data |

ι Persei, Latinized as Iota Persei, is a single star in the northern constellation Perseus. This object is visible to the naked eye as a faint, yellow-white hued point of light with an apparent visual magnitude of 4.1. It is located 34.5 light years from the Sun based on parallax, and is drifting further away with a radial velocity of +49 km/s. Iota Persei has a relatively high proper motion across the sky.

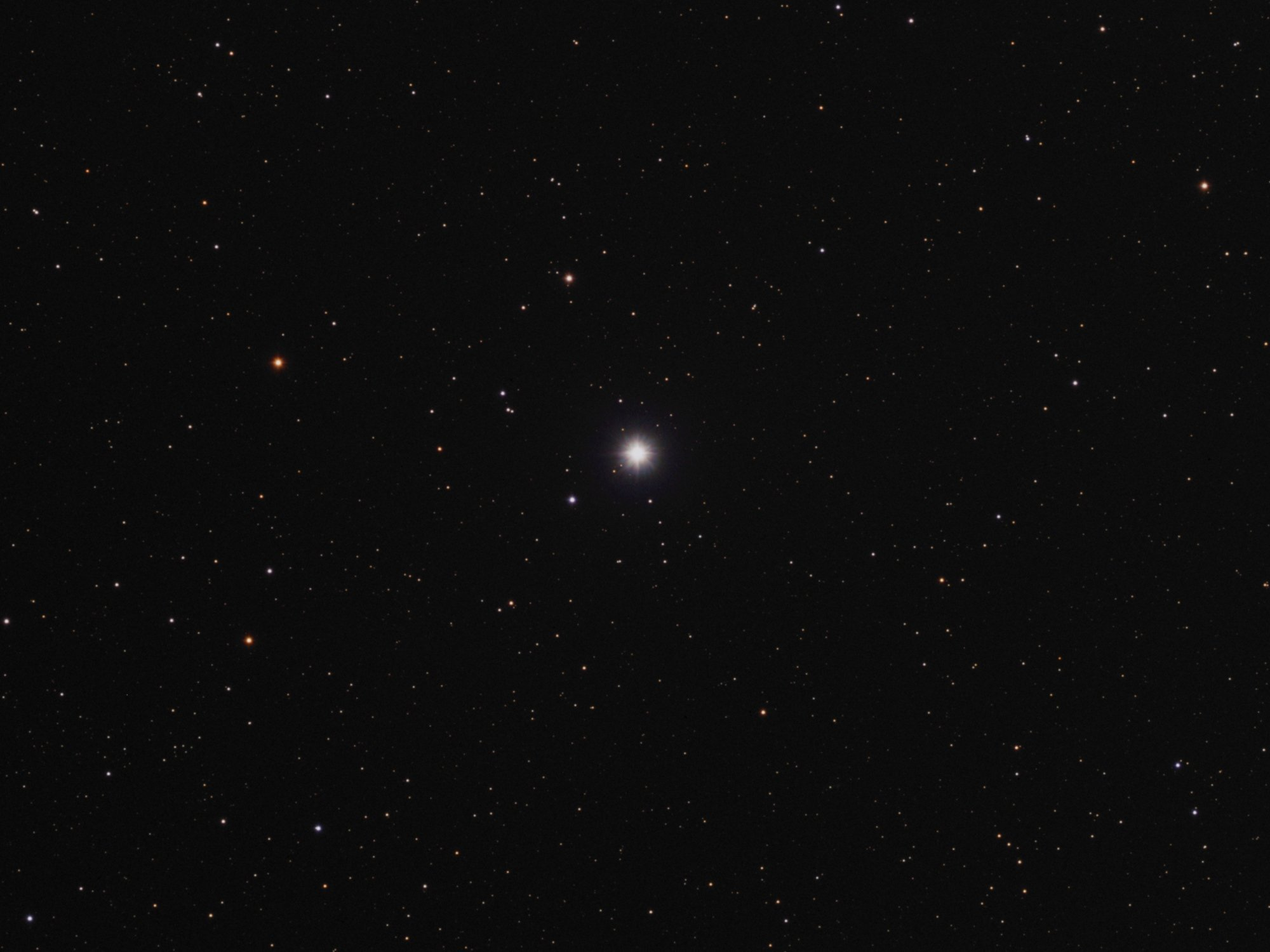
ι Persei in optical light

This is a late F- or early G-type main-sequence star with a stellar classification of around G0V. It is about 3–4 billion years old and is spinning slowly with a projected rotational velocity of 4 km/s. The star has 1.1 times the mass of the Sun and 1.383 times the Sun's radius. It is radiating 2.02 times the luminosity of the Sun from its photosphere at an effective temperature of 5,849 K.

There is a 12.4-magnitude line-of-sight companion star that is not believed to be gravitationally associated with Iota Persei. This object is located at an angular separation of 154.4″ from the primary along a position angle of 125°, as of 2014.

== Naming ==
In Chinese, 大陵 (Dà Líng), meaning Mausoleum, refers to an asterism consisting of ι Persei, 9 Persei, τ Persei, κ Persei, β Persei, ρ Persei, 16 Persei and 12 Persei. Consequently, the Chinese name for ι Persei itself is 大陵三 (Dà Líng sān, English: the Third Star of Mausoleum).
