= Phi2 Pavonis =

Star in the constellation Pavo

Phi^{2} Pavonis
Observation data Epoch J2000.0 Equinox J2000.0 (ICRS)
- Constellation: Pavo
- Right ascension: 20^{h} 40^{m} 02.63822^{s}
- Declination: −60° 32′ 56.0200″
- Apparent magnitude (V): +5.10

Characteristics
- Spectral type: G0 V Fe-0.8 CH-0.5
- U−B color index: −0.02
- B−V color index: +0.53

Astrometry
Radial velocity (R_{v})	−32.02±0.05 km/s
Proper motion (μ)	RA: +313.48 mas/yr Dec.: −569.91 mas/yr
Parallax (π)	40.55±0.27 mas
Distance	80.4 ± 0.5 ly (24.7 ± 0.2 pc)

Details
Mass	1.09±0.02 M_{☉}
Radius	1.86±0.05 R_{☉}
Luminosity	3.39 L_{☉}
Surface gravity (log g)	4.20±0.02 cgs
Temperature	6,091±27 K
Metallicity [Fe/H]	−0.38±0.04 dex
Rotation	27.7±1.7 d
Rotational velocity (v sin i)	1.95±0.43 km/s
Age	5.69±0.24 Gyr

Other designations
- φ^{2} Pav, CD−60°7508, GJ 794.2, GJ 9701, HD 196378, HIP 101983, HR 7875, SAO 254846

Database references
SIMBAD	data
ARICNS	data

Phi^{2} Pavonis (φ^{2} Pav, φ^{2} Pavonis) is a solitary star in the southern constellation of Pavo (the Peacock). It is faintly visible to the naked eye with an apparent visual magnitude of +5.10. Based upon an annual parallax shift of 40.55 mas as seen from Earth, it is located 80.4 light years from the Sun. At that distance, the visual magnitude is diminished by an extinction factor of 0.07 due to interstellar dust. It is a member of the thin disk population.

This is a yellow-white hued G-type main sequence star with a stellar classification of G0 V Fe-0.8 CH-0.5. This notation indicates the surface abundance of iron and cyanogen are below normal for this class of star. It is around 5.7 billion years old and is spinning with a period of around 28 days. It has an estimated 1.09 times the mass of the Sun and is 1.86 times the Sun's radius. The star is radiating 3.39 times the solar luminosity from its photosphere at an effective temperature of 6,091 K.

This system was in 1991 a test case for the Zeta Herculis moving group, of low metallicity stars with 5 billion years of age. This group includes besides Zeta Herculis: δ Trianguli, ζ Reticuli, 1 Hydrae, Gl 456, Gl 678, and Gl 9079.

In 1998, using the European Southern Telescope in Chile, a planet was announced to be orbiting the star. This team retracted this claim in 2002, but found a different periodicity of 7 days possibly due to stellar rotation.

== See also ==
- Zeta Herculis
