= Epsilon Herculis =

Multiple star system in the constellation Hercules

- Location of ε Herculis (circled)

Observation data Epoch J2000 Equinox J2000
- Constellation: Hercules
- Right ascension: 17^{h} 00^{m} 17.37378^{s}
- Declination: +30° 55′ 35.0565″
- Apparent magnitude (V): 3.9111

Characteristics
- Evolutionary stage: main sequence
- Spectral type: A0 V or A0 IV+
- U−B color index: −0.10
- B−V color index: −0.01

Astrometry
| Proper motion (μ) | RA: −47.69 mas/yr Dec.: +26.90 mas/yr |
| Parallax (π) | 21.04±0.14 mas |
| Distance | 155 ± 1 ly (47.5 ± 0.3 pc) |
| Absolute magnitude (M_{V}) | +0.54 |

Orbit
| Period (P) | 4.0235 d |
| Eccentricity (e) | 0.02 |
| Periastron epoch (T) | 2417947.2420 ± 10.0 JD |
| Argument of periastron (ω) (secondary) | 138° |
| Semi-amplitude (K_{1}) (primary) | 70.7 km/s |
| Semi-amplitude (K_{2}) (secondary) | 112.0 km/s |

Details
| Mass | 2.6±0.1 M_{☉} |
| Radius | 2.72±0.07 R_{☉} |
| Luminosity | 64 L_{☉} |
| Surface gravity (log g) | 3.98±0.02 cgs |
| Temperature | 10197±57 K |
| Metallicity [Fe/H] | −0.25±0.04 dex |
| Rotational velocity (v sin i) | 60 km/s |
| Age | 400+50 −40 Myr |

Other designations
- Khepdenreret, ε Her, 58 Her, BD+31°2947, FK5 634, GC 22935, HD 153808, HIP 83207, HR 6324, SAO 65716

Database references
| SIMBAD | data |

Epsilon Herculis, Latinized from ε Herculis, formally named Khepdenreret, is a fourth-magnitude multiple star system in the northern constellation of Hercules. The combined apparent visual magnitude of 3.9111 is bright enough to make this system visible to the naked eye. Based upon an annual parallax shift of 21.04 mas as seen from Earth, it is located 155 light years from the Sun. The system is moving closer to the Sun with a radial velocity of −25 km/s.

There is disagreement over the properties of this system. Petrie (1939) classified two components as class A0 and A2 with a visual magnitude difference of 1.5. Batten et al. (1989) catalogued it as a double-lined spectroscopic binary system with an orbital period of four days and an eccentricity of 0.02. However, Hipparcos was not able to detect the duplicity. Tokovinin (1997) and Faraggiana et al. (2001) catalogued it as a triple star system. Cowley et al. (1969) gave it a combined stellar classification of A0 V, whereas Gray & Garrison (1987) classified it as an A0 IV+. Wolff & Preston (1978) listed a magnesium overabundance. Since 1995 it has been classified as a Lambda Boötis star, although this has been brought into question.

In Chinese astronomy, 天紀 (Tiān Jì), meaning Celestial Discipline, refers to an asterism consisting of ε Herculis, ξ Coronae Borealis, ζ Herculis, 59 Herculis, 61 Herculis, 68 Herculis, HD 160054 and θ Herculis. Consequently, the Chinese name for ε Herculis itself is 天紀三 (Tiān Jì sān, English: the Third Star of Celestial Discipline). This star was also part of the ancient Egyptian constellation Reret, representing a hippopotamus goddess also called Taweret; it was named Khepdenreret, the buttocks of the hippopotamus, in the Ramesside star clocks. The IAU Working Group on Star Names adopted the name Khepdenreret for Epsilon Herculis Aa on 14 May 2026.
