= Theta Herculis =

Star in the constellation Hercules

θ Herculis
- Location of θ Herculis (circled in red)

Observation data Epoch J2000 Equinox ICRS
- Constellation: Hercules
- Right ascension: 17^{h} 56^{m} 15.18054^{s}
- Declination: +37° 15′ 01.9343″
- Apparent magnitude (V): 3.851

Characteristics
- Spectral type: K1IIaCN2
- U−B color index: +1.40
- B−V color index: +1.35
- R−I color index: +0.63
- Variable type: Irregular (suspected)

Astrometry
Radial velocity (R_{v})	–28.32 km/s
Proper motion (μ)	RA: 2.67 mas/yr Dec.: 6.47 mas/yr
Parallax (π)	4.33±0.13 mas
Distance	750 ± 20 ly (231 ± 7 pc)
Absolute magnitude (M_{V})	−2.71+0.26 −0.23

Details
Mass	5.89±0.07 M_{☉}
Radius	82±2 R_{☉}
Luminosity	2,410±150 L_{☉}
Surface gravity (log g)	1.37±0.04 cgs
Temperature	4,448±23 K
Metallicity [Fe/H]	−0.03±0.15 dex
Rotational velocity (v sin i)	3.4 ± 0.6 km/s
Age	130 Myr

Other designations
- θ Her, 91 Her, BD+37°2982, FK5 672, GC 24415, HD 163770, HIP 87808, HR 6695, SAO 66485

Database references
SIMBAD	data

Theta Herculis is a single, variable star in the northern constellation of Hercules. This object is visible to the naked eye as a faint, orange-hued star with an apparent visual magnitude of 3.851. Based upon parallax measurements, it is located around 750 light years away from the Sun. The star is advancing toward the Earth with a heliocentric radial velocity of –28 km/s.

This is an aging K-type bright giant with a stellar classification of K1IIaCN2, where the suffix notation indicates a strong overabundance of CN in the spectrum. The brightness variations of this star was first noticed in 1935 by M. Fedtke and confirmed by Erich Przybyllok and Kurt Walter the same year. French astronomer Paul Muller then classified Theta Herculis as an irregular variable with a range of magnitudes between 3.7 and 4.1 and a periodicity of roughly 8–9 days.

The star is about 130 million years old with 5.89 times the mass of the Sun. With the hydrogen at its core exhausted, the star has expanded to 82 times the Sun's radius. It is radiating 2,400 times the luminosity of the Sun from its enlarged photosphere at an effective temperature of 4,448 K.

== Nomenclature and etymology ==
θ Herculis is the Bayer designation, Latinised to Theta Herculis, abbreviated to θ Her or Theta Her.

In the Calendarium of Al Achsasi Al Mouakket, this star was designated Rekbet al Jathih al Aisr, which was translated into Latin as Genu Sinistrum Ingeniculi, meaning the left knee of the kneeling man.

In Chinese, 天紀 (Tiān Jì), meaning Celestial Discipline, refers to an asterism consisting of θ Herculis, ξ Coronae Borealis, ζ Herculis, ε Herculis, 59 Herculis, 61 Herculis, 68 Herculis and HD 160054. Consequently, the Chinese name for θ Herculis itself is 天紀九 (Tiān Jì jiǔ, English: the Ninth Star of Celestial Discipline.) It was also Tien Ke, Heaven's Record.
