= Zeta Herculis Moving Group =

Star cluster

Zeta Herculis Moving Group is a set of stars that share a common motion through space.

The existence of this moving group was first published in 1958 by Olin J. Eggen. Based upon the high velocity motion of the star Zeta Herculis through space, he searched for stars that were following a similar velocity and direction. A total of 22 candidate members were identified. Among the group members he included β Hydri, ρ Persei, η Reticuli, φ^{1} Lupi, ζ Herculis and ε Octantis. He estimated the group velocity at 74.5 km/s. In 1970, Richard Woolley refined the list to ten stars, including φ^{2} Pavonis and ζ^{1}/ζ^{2} Reticuli as members of this cluster.

The parallel motion of the stars in this group implies a common origin, and hence a similar age and composition. The membership of ζ Herculis and HD 158614 came into question because their composition appeared to show they were much younger than other members of the group. The average age was estimated as 8.2 billion years, while ζ Herculis was estimated as 6.3 billion years in age. However, a statistical analysis of the metallicity for stars in this group showed no difference from a comparison sample, indicating that it may not be possible to determine more information about this group based on the composition of its members.

Members of the ζ Her moving group (1958 version)
Name	Constellation	B	F	HD	HIP	vis. mag.	Dist. (ly)	Sp. class	Notes
ζ Her (Tianji)	Hercules	ζ	40	150680	81693	2.81	35	F9IV	
β Hyi	Hydrus	β		2151	2021	2.82	24	G2IV	
ρ Per	Perseus	ρ	25	19058	14354	3.32	325	M3IIIvar	Gorgonea Tertia
φ^{1} Lup	Lupus	φ^{1}	88	136422	75177	3.57	326	K5III	
47 Psc	Pisces		47	2411	2219	5.01	490	M3IIIvar	TV Psc
ε Oct	Octans	ε		210967	110256	5.09	268	M6III	BO Oct
η Ret	Reticulum	η		28093	20384	5.24	380	G7III	
84 Vir	Virgo		84	119425	66936	5.35	217	K1III	
HD 71377	Puppis			71377	41395	5.52	268	K1/K2III	
HD 43899	Columba			43899	29842	5.54	302	K2III	
HD 100733	Centaurus	C^{1}		100733	56518	5.64	652	M3III	V763 Cen
HD 150275	Ursa Minor			150275	80850	6.35	408	K1III	
29 LMi	Leo Minor		29	90250	51047	6.49	413	K1III	
HD 221354	Cassiopeia			221354	116085	6.76	55	K2V	Gliese 895.4
HD 9166	Cassiopeia			9166	7166	6.81	485	K3III	
HD 30455	Taurus			30455	22349	6.96	100	G2V...	
71 Leo	Leo		71	98824	55533	7.03	773	K1III	
HD 219829	Cassiopeia			219829	115112	8.09	106	K0V...	
HD 68788	Camelopardalis			68788	40848	8.35	101	K1V	
HD 209134	Pisces Austrinus			209134		9.11		K3V	
HD 89668	Sextans			89668	50657	9.42	106	F8V	
HD 106364	Camelopardalis			106364		10.03		K2III+...	

Members of the ζ Her moving group (1970 version)
Name	Constellation	B	F	HD	HIP	vis. mag.	Dist. (ly)	Sp. class	Notes
ζ Her (Tianji)	Hercules	ζ	40	150680	81693	2.81	35	F9IV	
β Hyi	Hydrus	β		2151	2021	2.82	24	G2IV	
φ^{2} Pav	Pavo	φ^{2}		196378	101983	5.11	79	F8V	
ζ^{2} Ret	Reticulum	ζ^{2}		20807	15371	5.24	39	G1V	
HD 158614	Ophiuchus			158614	85667	5.31	54	G8IV-V	Gliese 678
ζ^{1} Ret	Reticulum	ζ^{1}		20766	15330	5.53	40	G2V	
1 Hya	Hydra		1	70958	41211	5.61	89	F3V	
HD 14680	Fornax			14680	10977	8.79	100	F3V	
HIP 59198	Virgo				59198	11.69	94	K7	Gliese 456
