= Rho Persei =

Star in the constellation Perseus

ρ Persei
- Location of ρ Persei (circled)

Observation data Epoch J2000 Equinox ICRS
- Constellation: Perseus
- Right ascension: 03^{h} 05^{m} 10.59385^{s}
- Declination: +38° 50′ 24.9943″
- Apparent magnitude (V): +3.13 to 3.77

Characteristics
- Evolutionary stage: AGB
- Spectral type: M4 II
- U−B color index: +1.79
- B−V color index: +1.65
- Variable type: SRb

Astrometry
Radial velocity (R_{v})	+29.10±0.30 km/s
Proper motion (μ)	RA: +129.22 mas/yr Dec.: –105.70 mas/yr
Parallax (π)	10.60±0.25 mas
Distance	308 ± 7 ly (94 ± 2 pc)
Absolute magnitude (M_{V})	−1.7

Details
Mass	1.9±0.7 M_{☉}
Radius	143±12 R_{☉}
Luminosity	2,692+192 −180 L_{☉}
Surface gravity (log g)	0.37±0.15 cgs
Temperature	3,479±125 K
Metallicity [Fe/H]	−0.15 dex
Rotational velocity (v sin i)	11.2 km/s
Age	440 Myr

Other designations
- Gorgonea Tertia, Rho Per, ρ Per, 25 Persei, BD+38°630, FK5 109, GC 3682, HD 19058, HIP 14354, HR 921, SAO 56138, PPM 68074

Database references
SIMBAD	data

Rho Persei, Latinized from ρ Persei, is a star in the northern constellation of Perseus. It has the traditional name Gorgonea Tertia /ɡɔːrɡəˈniːə ˈtɜːrʃə/, being the third member of the quartet called the Gorgonea in reference to the Gorgons from the legend of Perseus. An apparent visual magnitude of around 3.5 makes it visible to the naked eye, but a challenge to view from a well-lit urban environment. Based upon parallax measurements, it is located at a distance of roughly 308 light-years (94 pc) from Earth.

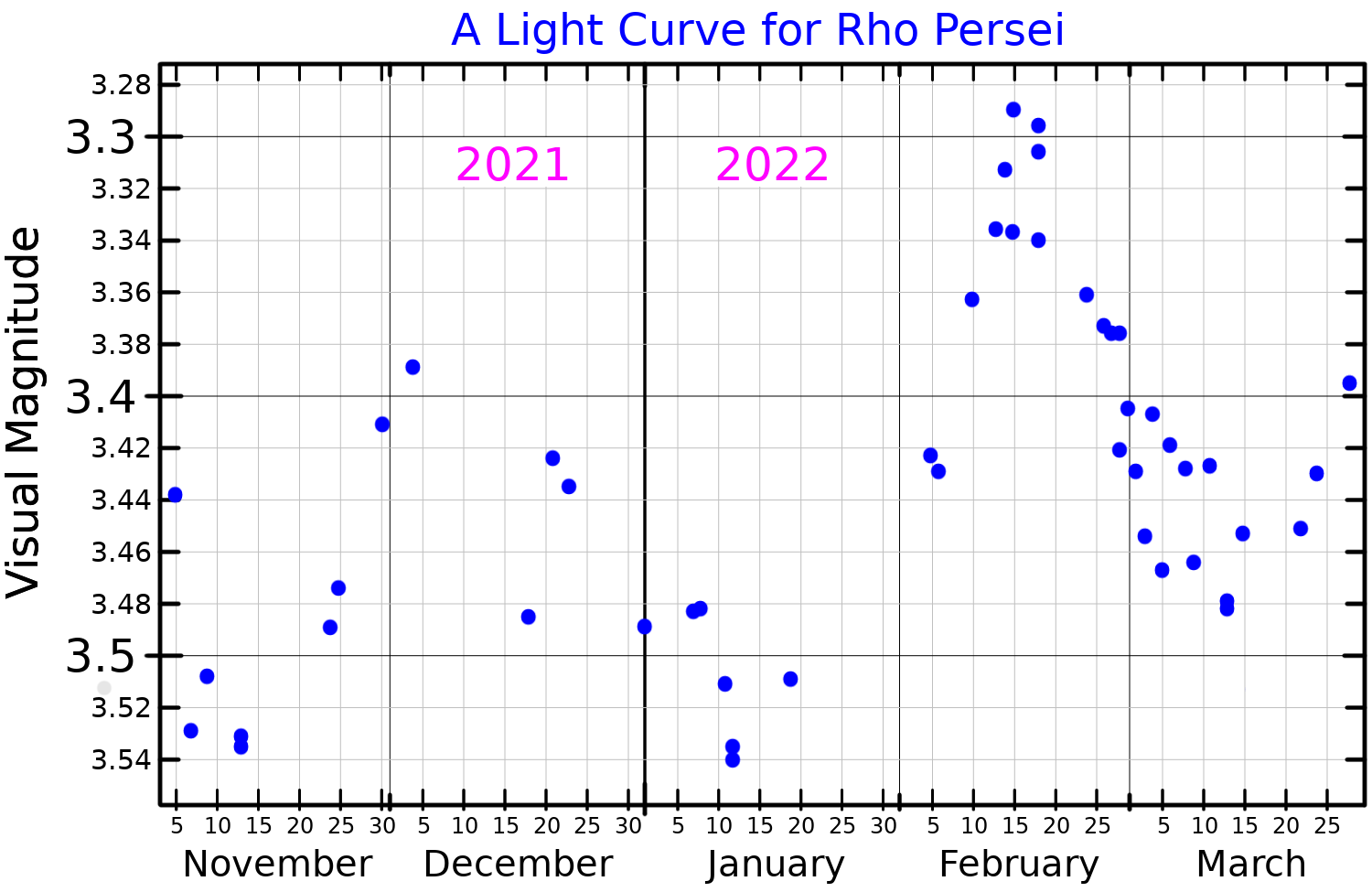
A visual band light curve for Rho Persei, plotted from AAVSO data

In 1854 Johann Schmidt discovered that Rho Persei is a variable star. Rho Persei is a semiregular variable star, whose apparent magnitude varies between 3.3 and 4.0 with periods of 50, 120 and 250 days. The star has reached the asymptotic giant branch of its evolution. It is a bright giant star with a stellar classification of M4 II. The outer envelope has an effective temperature of 3,479 K, giving it the red-orange hue of an M-type star.

This star has a mass 1.9 times the mass of the Sun, while it has expanded to 143 solar radii. It is radiating some 2,700 times the Sun's luminosity. Rho Persei is losing mass at the rate of 1.2×10^{−8} solar masses per year, or the equivalent of the Sun's mass every 83 million years. It is about 440 million years in age.

== Naming ==
In Chinese, 大陵 (Dà Líng), meaning Mausoleum, refers to an asterism consisting of ρ Persei, 9 Persei, τ Persei, ι Persei, κ Persei, β Persei, 16 Persei and 12 Persei. Consequently, the Chinese name for ρ Persei itself is 大陵六 (Dà Líng liù, Englishthe Sixth Star of Mausoleum.).
