= Jaana Toivari-Viitala =

Finnish egyptologist

Dr Jaana Toivari-Viitala
- Born: 16 May 1964; Loviisa
- Died: 12 May 2017 (aged 52); Helsinki

Academic background
- Education: Leiden University
- Thesis: Women at Deir El-Medina: A Study of the Status and Roles of the Female Inhabitants in the Workmen's Community During the Ramesside Period (2001)

Academic work
- Discipline: Egyptologist
- Institutions: University of Helsinki

Jaana Toivari-Viitala (16 May 1964 – 12 May 2017) was a Finnish egyptologist and museum curator who was Chair of the Finnish Egyptology Society and Head of the Department of Egyptology at the University of Helsinki.

== Biography ==
Toivari-Viitala was born in Loviisa on 16 May 1964. She was passionate about Ancient Egypt since her childhood. She studied for her PhD at the Leiden University, which explored the lives of the women who lived at Deir el-Medîna, the village where the builders of the tombs in the Valley of the Kings lived. This work examined many aspects of women's lives there, including sex, maternity and property ownership. She argued that women were independent and active in the economic life of the community there.

=== Career ===
Toivari-Viitala was one of the editors of The Deir el-Medina Database (an online index of texts from Deir el-Medîna, compiled at Leiden University from 1998), to which she contributed for many years. She was appointed head of the Department of Egyptology at the University of Helsinki. From 2008-13 she led the project Ihminen ja ympäristö (Man and the Environment), which was funded by the Academy of Finland in order to study and record part of the UNESCO World Heritage Site at Thebes.

In 2009, she curated the exhibition Egypt! Egypt! Egypt! which brought objects from collections across Europe to Finland, marking the 40th anniversary of the Finnish Egyptology Society. She became chair of the Finnish Egyptology Society in 2005. She was later curator at Loviisa Museum.

=== Research ===
Toivari-Viitala's research examined the role women played in Egyptian life, particularly in terms of economics and administration. She was also an expert on Egyptian love poetry, personal names and hieroglyphics. Her work on papyrus manuscripts led to a collaboration examining the eclipsing variable star Algol, which was recorded in the Cairo Calendar. The link between the astronomical phenomenon and the specific manuscript was first raised by Toivari-Viitala and was widely reported, including in the New Scientist.

Toivari-Viitala died suddenly in Helsinki on 12 May 2017.
