= Eta Reticuli =

Star in the constellation Reticulum

- Location of η Reticuli (circled)

Observation data Epoch J2000.0 Equinox J2000.0 (ICRS)
- Constellation: Reticulum
- Right ascension: 04^{h} 21^{m} 53.32714^{s}
- Declination: −63° 23′ 11.0072″
- Apparent magnitude (V): 5.22

Characteristics
- Spectral type: G7 III
- U−B color index: +0.62
- B−V color index: +0.945

Astrometry
Radial velocity (R_{v})	+45.0±0.8 km/s
Proper motion (μ)	RA: +85.56 mas/yr Dec.: +174.62 mas/yr
Parallax (π)	8.48±0.18 mas
Distance	385 ± 8 ly (118 ± 3 pc)
Absolute magnitude (M_{V})	+1.28

Details
Mass	2.54 M_{☉}
Radius	12 R_{☉}
Luminosity	120 L_{☉}
Surface gravity (log g)	2.49 cgs
Temperature	4,951±48 K
Metallicity [Fe/H]	−0.15±0.03 dex
Age	1.17 Gyr

Other designations
- Eta Ret, η Ret, CPD−63 324, FK5 163, HD 28093, HIP 20384, HR 1395, SAO 249009

Database references
SIMBAD	data

Eta Reticuli, Latinized from η Reticuli, is a solitary star in the southern constellation of Reticulum. With an apparent visual magnitude of 5.22, it is faintly visible to the naked eye on a dark night. Based upon an annual parallax shift of 8.48 mas, it is located at a distance of roughly 385 light years from the Sun. It may be a member of the high-velocity Zeta Herculis Moving Group of stars that share a common motion through space.

This is an evolved G-type giant star with a stellar classification of G7 III. Based upon stellar models, it has an estimated 2.54 times the mass of the Sun and 13.24 times the Sun's radius. With an age of around 1.17 billion years, it is radiating 120 times the solar luminosity from its outer atmosphere at an effective temperature of 4,948 K.

Eta Reticuli is moving through the Galaxy at a speed of 117.6 km/s relative to the Sun. Its projected Galactic orbit carries it between 11,700 and 31,600 light years from the center of the Galaxy.
