= HD 43899 =

Star in the constellation Columba

- Location of HD 43899 (circled in red)

Observation data Epoch J2000.0 Equinox ICRS
- Constellation: Columba
- Right ascension: 06^{h} 17^{m} 01.23139^{s}
- Declination: −37° 44′ 14.8056″
- Apparent magnitude (V): 5.53±0.01

Characteristics
- Evolutionary stage: red clump
- Spectral type: K2 III
- U−B color index: +1.11
- B−V color index: +1.14

Astrometry
Radial velocity (R_{v})	66.5±4.3 km/s
Proper motion (μ)	RA: +1.657 mas/yr Dec.: +83.920 mas/yr
Parallax (π)	11.4725±0.0449 mas
Distance	284 ± 1 ly (87.2 ± 0.3 pc)
Absolute magnitude (M_{V})	+0.73

Details
Mass	1.15±0.10 M_{☉}
Radius	11.67±0.19 R_{☉}
Luminosity	61^{+2.6}_{−5.0} L_{☉}
Surface gravity (log g)	2.04±0.24 cgs
Temperature	4,686±122 K
Metallicity [Fe/H]	−0.12±0.08 dex
Rotational velocity (v sin i)	2.9±1 km/s
Age	6.32±1.68 Gyr

Other designations
- 86 G. Columbae, CD−37°2707, CPD−37°890, GC 8075, HD 43899, HIP 29842, HR 2263, SAO 196653

Database references
SIMBAD	data

HD 43899, also designated as HR 2263, is a solitary, orange hued star located in the southern constellation Columba, the dove. It has an apparent magnitude of 5.53, allowing it to be faintly visible to the naked eye. Based on parallax measurements from the Gaia spacecraft, the object is estimated to be 284 light years distant. It appears to be rapidly receding with a heliocentric radial velocity of 66.5 km/s. Eggen (1993) lists HD 43899 as an old disk star and its kinematics match with that of the ζ Herculis moving group.

HD 43899 is an evolved giant star that is currently on the horizontal branch, a red clump star, fusing a hydrogen shell around an inert helium core. It has a stellar classification of K2 III. At present the object has 115% the mass of the Sun and an effective temperature of 4,686 K. At the age of 6.32 billion years, it has already left the main sequence and now radiates 61 times the luminosity of the Sun from an enlarged photosphere 11.7 times that of the sun. HD 43899 has an iron abundance 24% below solar levels, making it slightly metal deficient. It spins modestly with a projected rotational velocity of 2.9 km/s.
