= Algol paradox =

Paradox in astronomy

In stellar astronomy, the Algol paradox is a paradox situation when the two stars of a binary star system appear to act opposite their cycle towards death; one star is more advanced in its stellar evolution than the other despite that star being smaller (less massive) than the other. This paradox is observed when one smaller star has already exited its main sequence form and its larger partner has not. It is considered an axiom that the rate of evolution of stars depends on a star's mass: the greater the mass, the faster this evolution, and the more quickly it leaves the main sequence and starts to die, entering either its subgiant or giant phase.

In the case of Algol and other binary stars, something completely different is observed: the less massive star is already a subgiant, while the star with much greater mass is still on the main sequence. Since the partner stars of the binary are thought to have formed at approximately the same time and so should have similar ages, this appears paradoxical. The more massive star, rather than the less massive one, should have left the main sequence first.

The paradox is resolved by the fact that in many binary stars, there can be a flow of material between the two, disturbing the normal process of stellar evolution. As the flow progresses, their evolutionary stage advances, even as the relative masses change. Eventually, the originally more massive star reaches the next stage in its evolution despite having lost much of its mass to its companion.

== See also ==
- Algol variable
