= Epsilon Octantis =

Variable star in the constellation Octans

ε Octantis
- Location of ε Octantis (circled)

Observation data Epoch J2000 Equinox ICRS
- Constellation: Octans
- Right ascension: 22^{h} 20^{m} 01.67970^{s}
- Declination: −80° 26′ 23.0947″
- Apparent magnitude (V): 4.58 - 5.30

Characteristics
- Evolutionary stage: AGB
- Spectral type: M5III
- U−B color index: +1.18
- B−V color index: +1.47
- Variable type: SRb

Astrometry
Radial velocity (R_{v})	+11.70 km/s
Proper motion (μ)	RA: +56.81 mas/yr Dec.: −43.47 mas/yr
Parallax (π)	11.22±0.23 mas
Distance	291 ± 6 ly (89 ± 2 pc)
Absolute magnitude (M_{V})	+0.34

Details
Mass	1.34 M_{☉}
Radius	112±15 R_{☉}
Luminosity	1,819 L_{☉}
Surface gravity (log g)	2.15 cgs
Temperature	3,560±264 K

Other designations
- BO Oct, ε Oct, CD−81°831, FK5 839, GC 31166, HD 210967, HIP 110256, HR 8481, SAO 258928

Database references
SIMBAD	data

Epsilon Octantis, Latinized from ε Octantis, is a star in the southern circumpolar constellation of Octans. It is a faintly visible to the naked eye with an apparent visual magnitude of about 5. The annual parallax shift of 11.22 mas yields a distance estimate of around 291 light years. It is moving further from the Sun with a radial velocity of +11.7 km/s.

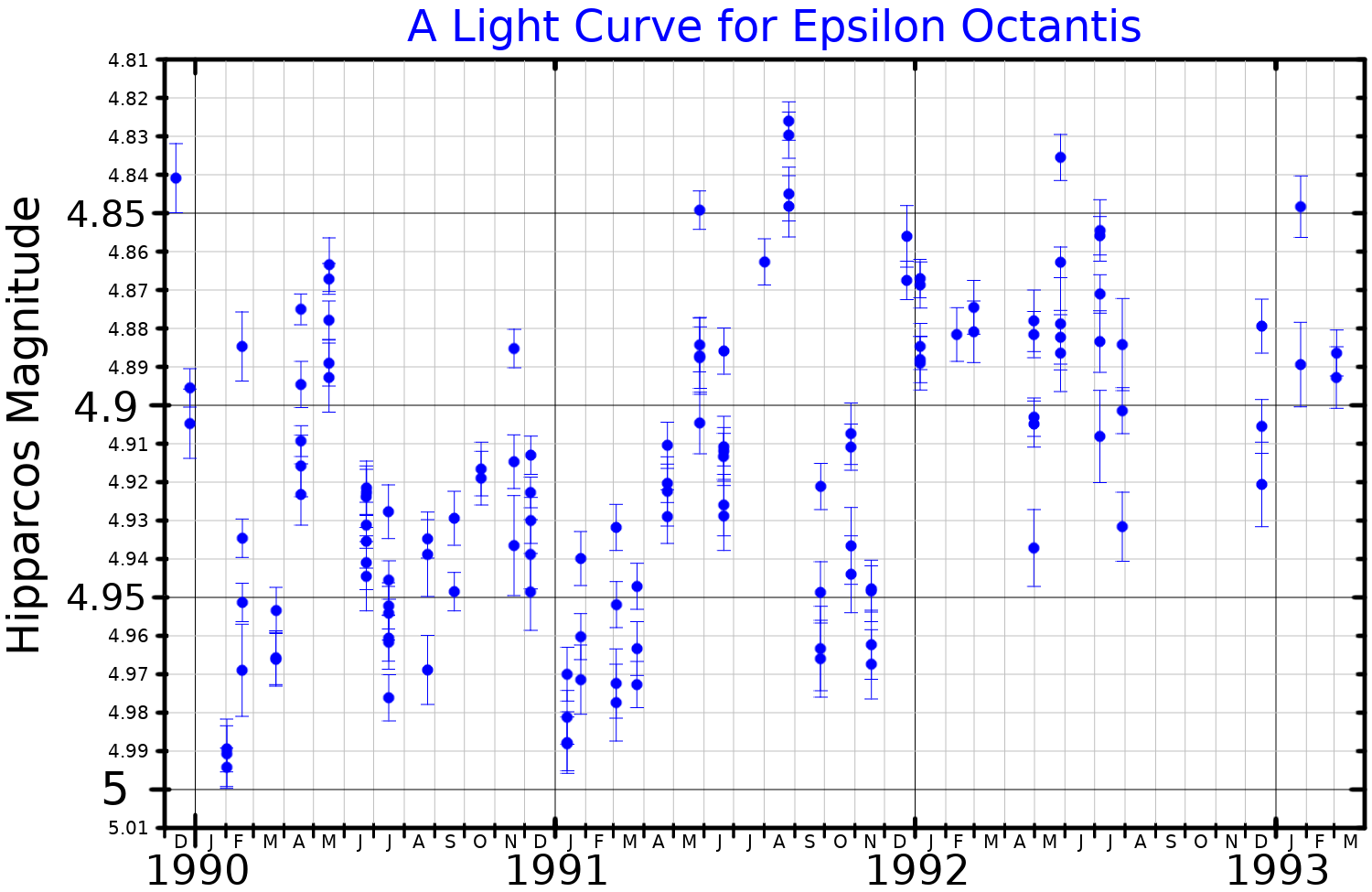
A light curve for Epsilon Octantis, plotted from Hipparcos data

This is an evolved, cool red giant star with a stellar classification of class M5III. It is a semiregular variable with a magnitude range of 4.58 to 5.30 and a (poorly defined) period around 55 days. The star has 1.34 times the mass of the Sun and has expanded to around 112 times the Sun's radius. It is radiating 1,819 times the Sun's luminosity from its enlarged photosphere at an effective temperature of 3,560 K.

Epsilon Octantis was found to be variable on a survey of the southern sky conducted by the Bamberg observatory, which was reported in 1966. In 1972, it was assigned the variable star designation BO Octantis, although this is now recognised as a mistake since stars with Bayer designations are not given a separate variable star designation.
