= HD 158614 =

Binary star in the constellation Ophiuchus

Observation data Epoch J2000.0 Equinox ICRS
- Constellation: Ophiuchus
- Right ascension: 17^{h} 30^{m} 23.79699^{s}
- Declination: −01° 03′ 46.4882″
- Apparent magnitude (V): +5.31 (6.02 + 5.93)

Characteristics
- Evolutionary stage: Subgiant
- Spectral type: G9IV-V + G9IV-V
- B−V color index: +0.715±0.013

Astrometry
Radial velocity (R_{v})	−77.197±0.064 km/s
Proper motion (μ)	RA: −127.77 mas/yr Dec.: −168.61 mas/yr
Parallax (π)	61.19±0.68 mas
Distance	53.3 ± 0.6 ly (16.3 ± 0.2 pc)
Absolute magnitude (M_{V})	4.24

Orbit
Period (P)	46.585±0.023 yr
Semi-major axis (a)	969.71±0.60 mas
Eccentricity (e)	0.17636±0.00074
Inclination (i)	99.177±0.037°
Longitude of the node (Ω)	151.769±0.033°
Periastron epoch (T)	2008.601±0.037
Argument of periastron (ω) (secondary)	324.57±0.32°
Semi-amplitude (K_{1}) (primary)	5.00±0.11 km/s
Semi-amplitude (K_{2}) (secondary)	5.40±0.11 km/s

Details

A
Mass	1.018±0.048 M_{☉}

B
Mass	0.943±0.046 M_{☉}

Other designations
- STF 2173, BD−00°3300, GJ 678, HIP 85667, HR 6516, SAO 141702, WDS J17304-0104

Database references
SIMBAD	data

HD 158614 is a visual binary star system in the equatorial constellation of Ophiuchus. The system is visible to the naked eye with a combined apparent visual magnitude of +5.31. It is located at a distance of 53.3 light years from the Sun based on parallax, but is drifting closer with a radial velocity of −77 km/s and is predicted to come to within 11.0 light-years in around 196,000 years. The system has been included as a candidate member of the Zeta Herculis moving group. However, chemical abundances appear to rule that out.

The pair were found to be a double star by F. G. W. Struve in 1827 and given the catalogue identifier Σ 2173 (now STF 2173). Since then it has completed multiple orbits, yielding orbital elements showing a period of 46.585 years and an eccentricity of 0.17636. The two components have similar spectra that match a stellar classification of G9IV-V. They show almost no luminosity variation; one of the pair appears to vary by 0.002 in magnitude. Both components have masses similar to that of the Sun: 102% and 94%, respectively.

== See also ==
- Zeta Herculis
