= Zeta Reticuli =

Binary star system in the constellation Reticulum

ζ Reticuli
- Location of ζ Reticuli (circled)

Observation data Epoch J2000.0 Equinox J2000.0
- Constellation: Reticulum
- ζ^{1} Ret
- Right ascension: 03^{h} 17^{m} 46.16345^{s}
- Declination: −62° 34′ 31.1525″
- Apparent magnitude (V): 5.52
- ζ^{2} Ret
- Right ascension: 03^{h} 18^{m} 12.81888^{s}
- Declination: −62° 30′ 22.9047″
- Apparent magnitude (V): 5.22

Characteristics
- Spectral type: G3−5V + G2V
- U−B color index: +0.08 / +0.01
- B−V color index: +0.63 / +0.58
- R−I color index: +0.34 / +0.34

Astrometry

ζ^{1} Ret
Radial velocity (R_{v})	+12.44±0.12 km/s
Proper motion (μ)	RA: +1,337.5 mas/yr Dec.: +649.8 mas/yr
Parallax (π)	83.0240±0.0438 mas
Distance	39.28 ± 0.02 ly (12.045 ± 0.006 pc)
Absolute magnitude (M_{V})	5.11±0.01
Absolute bolometric magnitude (M_{bol})	5.03±0.03

ζ^{2} Ret
Radial velocity (R_{v})	+11.94±0.13 km/s
Proper motion (μ)	RA: +1,331 mas/yr Dec.: +647.725 mas/yr
Parallax (π)	83.0606±0.0608 mas
Distance	39.27 ± 0.03 ly (12.039 ± 0.009 pc)
Absolute magnitude (M_{V})	4.83
Absolute bolometric magnitude (M_{bol})	4.79±0.03

Details

ζ^{1} Ret
Mass	0.95+0.02 −0.01 M_{☉}
Radius	0.92±0.02 R_{☉}
Luminosity	0.80±0.04 L_{☉}
Surface gravity (log g)	4.53±0.01 cgs
Temperature	5,737±7 K
Metallicity [Fe/H]	−0.224±0.004 dex
Rotational velocity (v sin i)	2.2±0.8 km/s
Age	3.40+0.72 −0.43 Gyr

ζ^{2} Ret
Mass	0.91±0.05 M_{☉}
Radius	0.98±0.02 R_{☉}
Luminosity	1.01±0.06 L_{☉}
Surface gravity (log g)	4.43±0.10 cgs
Temperature	5,846+52 −59 K
Metallicity [Fe/H]	−0.26±0.03 dex
Rotational velocity (v sin i)	1.74 km/s
Age	1.5–3.0 Gyr

Other designations
- ζ Reticuli, WDS J03182-6230
- ζ^{1} Reticuli: ζ^{1} Ret, Zeta^{1} Ret, CPD−63°217, GJ 136, HD 20766, HIP 15330, HR 1006, SAO 248770, LFT 275, LHS 171, LTT 1573
- ζ^{2} Reticuli: ζ^{2} Ret, Zeta^{2} Ret, CPD−62°265, GJ 138, HD 20807, HIP 15371, HR 1010, SAO 248774, LFT 276, LHS 172, LTT 1576

Database references
SIMBAD	ζ^{1} Ret
- ζ^{2} Ret

Zeta Reticuli is a wide binary star system in the southern constellation of Reticulum. Its name is a Bayer designation that is Latinized from ζ Reticuli and abbreviated Zeta Ret or ζ Ret. From the southern hemisphere the pair can be seen with the naked eye as a double star in very dark skies. Based upon parallax measurements, this system is located at a distance of about 39.3 light-years (12 parsecs) from Earth. Both stars are solar analogs, which means they have physical characteristics similar to those of the Sun. They belong to the Zeta Herculis Moving Group of co-moving stars that share a common origin.

== Nomenclature ==
At a declination of −62°, the system is not visible from Britain's latitude of +53°, so it never received a Flamsteed designation in John Flamsteed's 1712 Historia Coelestis Britannica. The Bayer designation for this star system, Zeta (ζ) Reticuli, originated in a 1756 star map by the French astronomer Abbé Nicolas-Louis de Lacaille. Subsequently, the two stars received separate designations in the Cape Photographic Durchmusterung, which was processed between 1859 and 1903, then in the Henry Draper Catalogue, published between 1918 and 1924.

== Characteristics ==
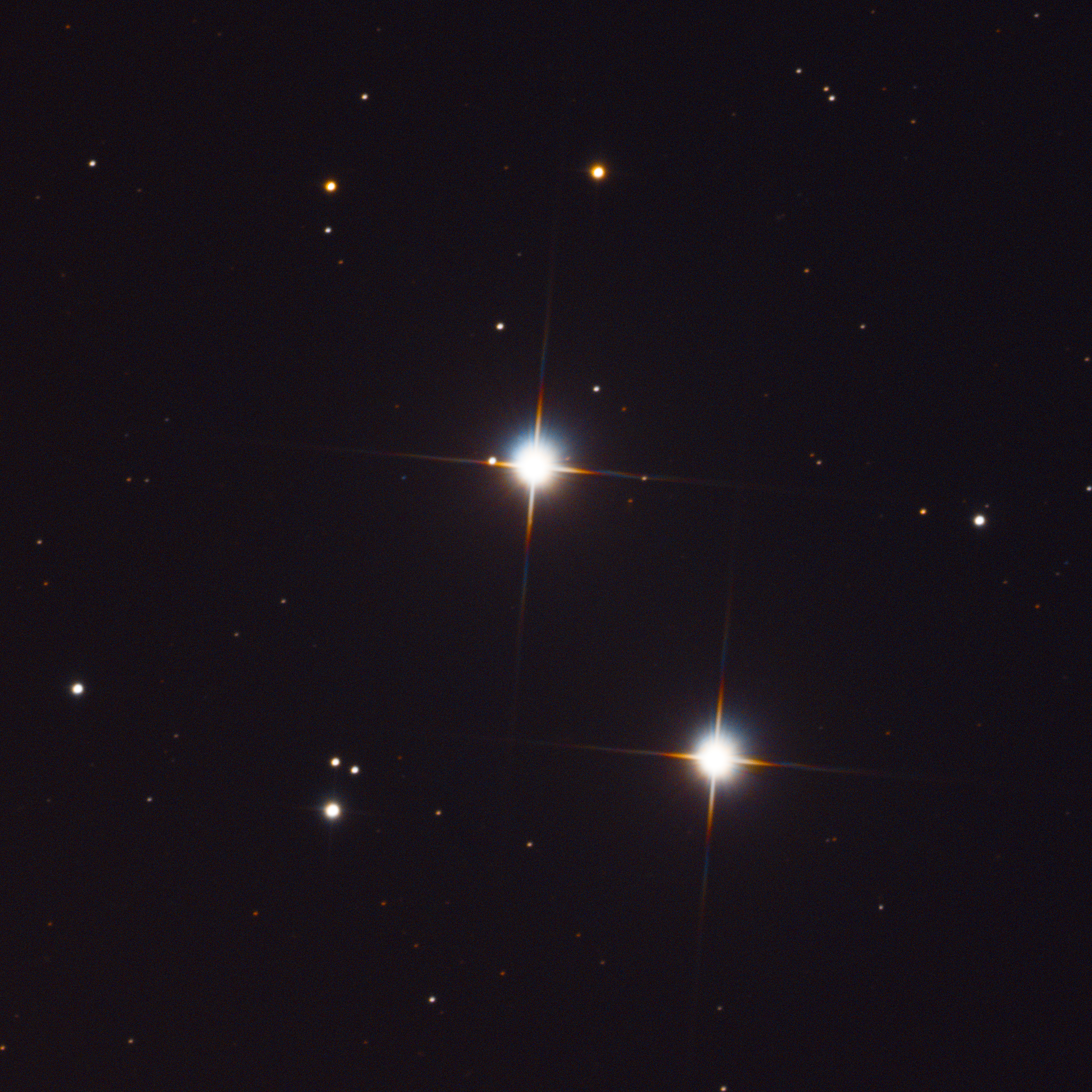

The double star ζ Reticuli is located in the western part of the small Reticulum constellation, about 25′ from the constellation's border with Horologium. In dark southern skies, the two stars can be viewed separately with the naked eye, or with a pair of binoculars. ζ^{1} Reticuli has an apparent magnitude of 5.52, placing it on the border between 5th- and 6th-magnitude stars. ζ^{2} Reticuli is slightly brighter at magnitude 5.22.

The two stars are located at similar distances from the Sun and share the same motion through space, confirming that they are gravitationally bound and form a wide binary star system. They have an angular separation of 309.2 arcseconds (5.2 arcminutes); far enough apart to appear as a close pair of separate stars to the naked eye under suitable viewing conditions. The distance between the two stars is at least 3,750 AU (0.06 light-year, or almost a hundred times the average distance between Pluto and the Sun), so their orbital period is 170,000 years or more.

Both stars share similar physical characteristics to the Sun, so they are considered solar analogs. Their stellar classification is nearly identical to that of the Sun. ζ^{1} has 95% of the Sun's mass and 92% of the Sun's radius. ζ^{2} is slightly larger and more luminous than ζ^{1}, with 91% of the Sun's mass and 98% of the Sun's radius. The two stars are somewhat deficient in metals, having only 60% of the proportion of elements other than hydrogen and helium as compared to the Sun. For reasons that remain uncertain, ζ^{1} has an anomalously low abundance of beryllium. Two possible explanations are: during the star's formation it underwent multiple intense bursts of mass accretion from a rapidly rotating protostellar cloud, or else the star underwent rotational mixing brought on by a period of rapid rotation during the star's youth.

Both stars were considered unusual because they were thought to have had a lower luminosity than is normal for main-sequence stars of their age and surface temperature. That is, they lie below the main-sequence curve on the Hertzsprung–Russell diagram for newly formed stars. However, this was challenged, after using the much more accurate parallaxes from the Hipparcos catalogue (ESA, 1997), it was calculated that the stars actually have higher luminosities and so are shifted upwards, putting them in the main sequence. Most stars will evolve above this curve as they age.

ζ^{1} has an intermediate level of magnetic activity in its chromosphere with an erratic variability. A long-term activity cycle of ~4.2 years has been tentatively identified. ζ^{2} is more sedate, showing a much lower level of activity with a ~7.9-year cycle, which may indicate it is in a Maunder Minimum state. Although the kinematics of this system suggest that they belong to a population of older stars, the properties of their stellar chromospheres suggests that they are only about 2 billion years old.

This star system belongs to the Zeta Herculis Moving Group of stars that share a common motion through space, suggesting that they have a common origin. In the galactic coordinate system, the [U, V, W] components of the space velocity for this system are equal to [−70.2, −47.4, +16.4] km/s for ζ^{1} and [−69.7, −46.4, +16.8] km/s for ζ^{2}. They are currently following an orbit through the Milky Way galaxy that has an eccentricity of 0.24. This orbit will carry the system as close as 17.4 kly (5.335 kpc) and as far as 28.6 kly (8.769 kpc) from the Galactic Center. The inclination of this orbit will carry the stars as much as 1.3 kly (0.4 kpc) from the plane of the galactic disk. This likely puts them outside the thick disk population of stars.

== Alleged debris disk ==
Zeta Reticuli has no known planets. In 2002, ζ^{1} was examined at an infrared wavelength of 25 μm, but no indication of an excess of infrared radiation was found.

In 2007, the Spitzer Space Telescope was used to find an apparent infrared excess at a wavelength of 70 μm around ζ^{2}. This radiation was attributed to emission by a debris disk with a mean temperature of 150 K (−123 °C), theorized to be orbiting the host star at a distance of 4.3 AU. In 2010, the Herschel Space Observatory, a telescope with a comparatively superior spatial resolution and, unlike Spitzer, able to resolve radiation excesses beyond the wavelength of 70 μm, determined the infrared excess as coming from a two-lobed structure that looked like a debris disk seen edge-on. This debris disk interpreted as an analogy to the Kuiper belt with a semi-major axis of 100 AU and a temperature of 30–40 K.

However, observations with ALMA from October and November 2017 revealed that the structure observed by Herschel shows no common proper motion with Zeta Reticuli. In these observations, no significant flux has been detected around ζ^{2}, showing that the alleged debris disk is not real, but rather a case of background confusion. The observations demonstrate the need to follow up Herschel observations of debris disks.

== In UFO folklore ==
The bestseller The Interrupted Journey (1966) about Barney and Betty Hill reproduced a "star map" drawn by Betty, allegedly based on one she saw aboard an alien spaceship. Based on the map, a fan of the book named Marjorie Fish speculated that the aliens might originate from Zeta Reticuli. By 1974, the Hill case was referred to as the Zeta Reticuli incident.

In the episode entitled "Encyclopaedia Galactica" (S01E12) of the limited series Cosmos (1980), Carl Sagan demonstrated that the Hill map bore no resemblance to the real-life map.

In the broadcast UFO Cover Up? Live (1988), alleged government informant "Falcon" (Richard C. Doty) spread stories of Majestic 12, a hidden cabal that supposedly has made a secret treaty with grey aliens from Zeta Reticuli who operate out of Area 51. Alleged Area 51 worker Bob Lazar has spread similar stories of aliens from Zeta Reticuli.
