= 68 Herculis =

Triple star system in the constellation Hercules

- Location of 68 Herculis (circled)

Observation data Epoch J2000 Equinox ICRS
- Constellation: Hercules
- Right ascension: 17^{h} 17^{m} 19.56781^{s}
- Declination: +33° 06′ 00.3684″
- Apparent magnitude (V): 4.80

Characteristics
- Spectral type: B2 V + B8-9
- B−V color index: −0.166±0.011
- Variable type: Algol/semi-detached

Astrometry
Radial velocity (R_{v})	−17.1±2.8 km/s
Proper motion (μ)	RA: −4.298 mas/yr Dec.: −5.621 mas/yr
Parallax (π)	3.4346±0.1164 mas
Distance	950 ± 30 ly (291 ± 10 pc)
Absolute magnitude (M_{V})	−2.66±0.30 (−2.35 + −1.15)

Orbit
Primary	68 Her Aa
Name	68 Her Ab
Period (P)	2.05102685 days
Semi-major axis (a)	14.95±0.17 R_{☉}
Eccentricity (e)	0.0 (fixed)
Inclination (i)	78.9±0.4°
Periastron epoch (T)	50,344.99±0.009
Argument of periastron (ω) (secondary)	0.0 (fixed)°
Semi-amplitude (K_{1}) (primary)	101±1 km/s
Semi-amplitude (K_{2}) (secondary)	252±1.8 km/s

Details

68 Her Aa
Mass	7.88±0.26 M_{☉}
Radius	4.93±0.15 R_{☉}
Luminosity	4,786+343 −319 L_{☉}
Surface gravity (log g)	3.948±0.024 cgs
Temperature	21,600±220 K
Rotational velocity (v sin i)	145±5 km/s

68 Her Ab
Mass	2.79±0.12 M_{☉}
Radius	4.26±0.06 R_{☉}
Luminosity	426.5+86.4 −71.7 L_{☉}
Surface gravity (log g)	3.625±0.013 cgs
Temperature	12,600±550 K
Rotational velocity (v sin i)	105±5 km/s

Other designations
- u Her, 68 Her, BD+33°2864, HD 156633, HIP 84573, HR 6431, SAO 65913, WDS J17173+3306A

Database references
SIMBAD	data

68 Herculis is a triple star system located around 950 light-years away from the Sun in the northern constellation of Hercules. In the astronomical community it is often referred to by its Bayer designation of u Herculis, while 68 Herculis is the Flamsteed designation. The system is visible to the naked eye as a faint, blue-white-hued point of light with a peak apparent visual magnitude of 4.80. It is approaching the Earth with a heliocentric radial velocity of −17 km/s.

As early as the 1840s, Johann Friedrich Julius Schmidt believed 68 Herculis was a variable star, initially thinking it might be a long period or irregular variable. By 1869 he had concluded that its brightness varies with a regular period, but his period estimates were far longer than the true value. In 1908 the star was put on an observing program at Harvard College Observatory, and professor Oliver Wendell determined that the star is an eclipsing binary with a period of 2.05 days.

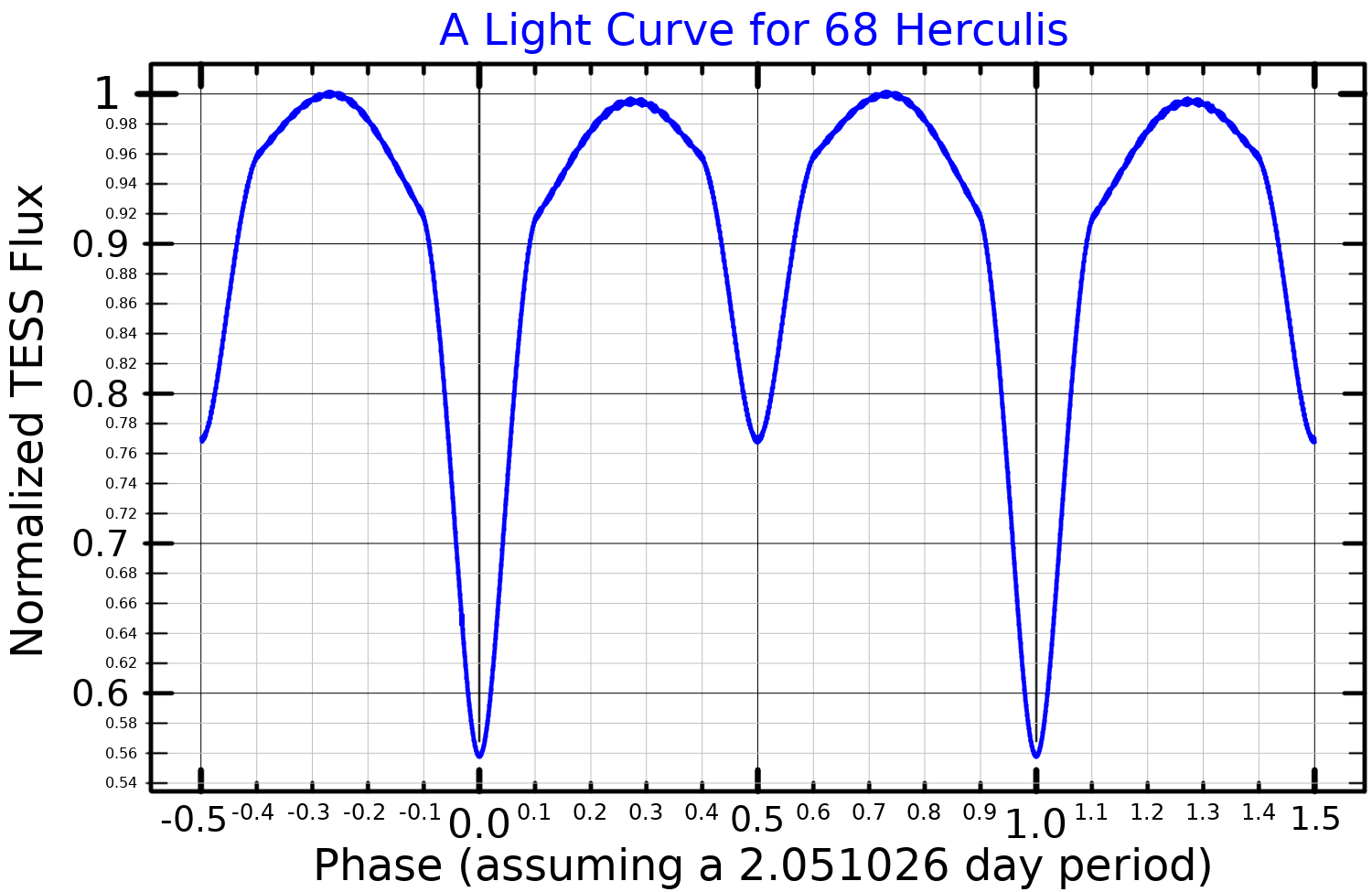
A light curve for 68 Herculis, plotted from TESS data

The inner pair of this system form a well-studied semidetached binary with the orbital plane oriented near the line of sight to the Earth, making it an Algol-type eclipsing binary. They have an orbital period of just over two days and a semimajor axis of 15 times the radius of the Sun, with the secondary component transferring mass to the hotter primary star. The main eclipse reduces the magnitude of the system to 5.37, while the second eclipse lowers the brightness to magnitude 4.93. Theoretical calculations suggest the donor star began with 7.2 times the mass of the Sun, the current primary at 3.6 solar masses, and their initial orbital period was around 1.35 days.

The primary, designated component Aa or sometimes just A, displays Beta Cephei-like pulsational behavior. It appears to be a B-type main-sequence star with a stellar classification of B2 V. The star has a high rate of spin, with a projected rotational velocity of 145 km/s. It has nearly eight times the mass of the Sun and five times the Sun's radius. The star is radiating 4,786 times the Sun's luminosity from its photosphere at an effective temperature of 21,600 K.

The secondary, component Ab or occasionally just B, has proven difficult to classify, but appears as a B-type star of type B8-9. It is close to triple the mass of the Sun with 4.3 times the Sun's radius. The star is spinning with a projected rotational velocity of 105 km/s. It is radiating 426.5 times the Sun's luminosity from its photosphere at an effective temperature of 12,600 K.

The third member of this system, component B, lies at an angular separation of 4.4″ from the inner pair with a visual magnitude of 10.2. It shares a common proper motion and similar parallax to the eclipsing pair, and is modelled to be a main-sequence star somewhat more massive, hotter, and more luminous than the Sun. Any orbit would require thousands of years.
