= Xi Coronae Borealis =

Star in the constellation Corona Borealis

ξ Coronae Borealis
- Location of ξ Coronae Borealis (circled)

Observation data Epoch J2000.0 Equinox J2000.0 (ICRS)
- Constellation: Corona Borealis
- Right ascension: 16^{h} 22^{m} 05.82391^{s}
- Declination: +30° 53′ 31.1837″
- Apparent magnitude (V): 4.85

Characteristics
- Evolutionary stage: red clump
- Spectral type: G9 IIIFe−0.5
- U−B color index: +0.80
- B−V color index: +0.97

Astrometry
Radial velocity (R_{v})	−29.20±0.16 km/s
Proper motion (μ)	RA: −97.43 mas/yr Dec.: +107.45 mas/yr
Parallax (π)	17.78±0.25 mas
Distance	183 ± 3 ly (56.2 ± 0.8 pc)
Absolute magnitude (M_{V})	+1.04

Details
Mass	2.36 M_{☉}
Radius	8 R_{☉}
Luminosity	36 L_{☉}
Surface gravity (log g)	2.9 cgs
Temperature	4,853±5 K
Metallicity [Fe/H]	−0.08 dex
Rotational velocity (v sin i)	2.8 km/s
Age	676 Myr

Other designations
- ξ CrB, 19 CrB, BD+31°2845, HD 147677, HIP 80181, HR 6103, SAO 65254, WDS J16221+3054A

Database references
SIMBAD	data

Xi Coronae Borealis (ξ CrB) is a binary star system in the northern constellation of Corona Borealis. It is visible to the naked eye with a combined apparent visual magnitude of 4.85. Based upon an annual parallax shift of 17.78 mas as seen from the Earth, it is located about 183 light years from the Sun.

As of 2009, the pair had an angular separation of 91 mas along a position angle of 139.4°. The brighter member, component Aa, is an evolved G-type giant star with a stellar classification of G9 III. It is a red clump star that is generating energy by helium fusion at its core. The star has an estimated 2.36 times the mass of the Sun and has expanded to 8 times the Sun's radius. It is radiating 36 times the solar luminosity from its photosphere at an effective temperature of 4,853 K.

In Chinese astronomy, this star is part of the constellation Tiānjì (天紀, "Celestial Discipline"), the rest of which is in Hercules. The Chinese name for ξ CrB itself is Tiānjì yī (天紀一), the first star of Tiānjì.
