= 12 Persei =

Star in the constellation Perseus

- Location of 12 Persei (circled)

Observation data Epoch J2000.0 Equinox ICRS
- Constellation: Perseus
- Right ascension: 02^{h} 42^{m} 14.91569^{s}
- Declination: +40° 11′ 38.1898″
- Apparent magnitude (V): 4.94

Characteristics
- Evolutionary stage: main sequence
- Spectral type: F9 V
- U−B color index: +0.08
- B−V color index: +0.56

Astrometry
| Radial velocity (R_{v}) | −23.04±0.04 km/s |
| Proper motion (μ) | RA: −17.20 mas/yr Dec.: −183.30 mas/yr |
| Parallax (π) | 41.34±0.43 mas |
| Distance | 78.9 ± 0.8 ly (24.2 ± 0.3 pc) |
| Absolute magnitude (M_{V}) | +2.99 |

Orbit
| Period (P) | 330.98 d |
| Semi-major axis (a) | 53.18 mas |
| Eccentricity (e) | 0.663 |
| Inclination (i) | 127.17° |

Details

12 Per A
| Mass | 1.382±0.019 M_{☉} |
| Radius | 1.55 R_{☉} |
| Luminosity | 3.02 L_{☉} |
| Surface gravity (log g) | 4.20±0.10 cgs |
| Temperature | 6195±200 K |
| Metallicity [Fe/H] | ≥0.35 dex |
| Rotational velocity (v sin i) | 13 km/s |
| Age | 1.12 Gyr |

12 Per B
| Mass | 1.240±0.017 M_{☉} |
| Radius | 1.31 R_{☉} |
| Luminosity | 1.86 L_{☉} |
| Surface gravity (log g) | 4.30±0.10 cgs |
| Temperature | 6000±200 K |

Other designations
- 12 Per, BD+39° 610, FK5 2187, GJ 105.6 АВ, HD 16739, HIP 12623, HR 788, SAO 55793

Database references
| SIMBAD | data |

12 Persei (12 Per) is a double-lined spectroscopic binary star system in the northern constellation Perseus. Its combined apparent magnitude is 4.94, which means it can be viewed with the naked eye. Based upon parallax measurements, this system is about 79 light years away from the Sun.

The magnitude difference between the two components is estimated to be 0.51. Based upon this, the primary has a mass around 138% of the Sun, 155% of the Sun's radius, and shines with three times the Sun's luminosity. The smaller secondary component is also larger than the Sun, with 124% of the Sun's mass, 131% of the radius of the Sun, and has 186% of the Sun's luminosity. The stellar classification of the primary is F9 V, which suggests it is an F-type main sequence star. The pair have an estimated age of just over a billion years.

The pair orbit each other with a period of 331 days and an eccentricity of 0.663. The semimajor axis of their orbit is 1.27 AU, which means the inner stability radius for a hypothetical planet orbiting the pair would be at 4.35 AU. This lies outside the habitability zone for this system.
