= 9 Persei =

Blue supergiant star in the constellation Perseus

- Location of 9 Persei (circled)

Observation data Epoch J2000 Equinox ICRS
- Constellation: Perseus
- Right ascension: 02^{h} 22^{m} 21.43482^{s}
- Declination: +55° 50′ 44.3518″
- Apparent magnitude (V): 5.15 - 5.25

Characteristics
- Spectral type: A2 Ia
- U−B color index: −0.11
- B−V color index: +0.37
- Variable type: α Cyg

Astrometry
Radial velocity (R_{v})	−15.20 km/s
Proper motion (μ)	RA: +0.374 mas/yr Dec.: −1.798 mas/yr
Parallax (π)	0.7603±0.1139 mas
Distance	approx. 4,300 ly (approx. 1,300 pc)
Absolute magnitude (M_{V})	−4.73

Details
Mass	10.5 M_{☉}
Radius	88.9+3.8 −2.8 R_{☉}
Luminosity	12,331±2,189 L_{☉}
Surface gravity (log g)	1.74 cgs
Temperature	9,840 K
Metallicity [Fe/H]	+0.26 dex
Rotational velocity (v sin i)	25 km/s

Other designations
- i Persei, 9 Per, V474 Per, BD+55°598, FK5 2159, GC 2836, HD 14489, HIP 11060, HR 685, SAO 23256, CCDM J02224+5551A, WDS J02224+5551A

Database references
SIMBAD	data

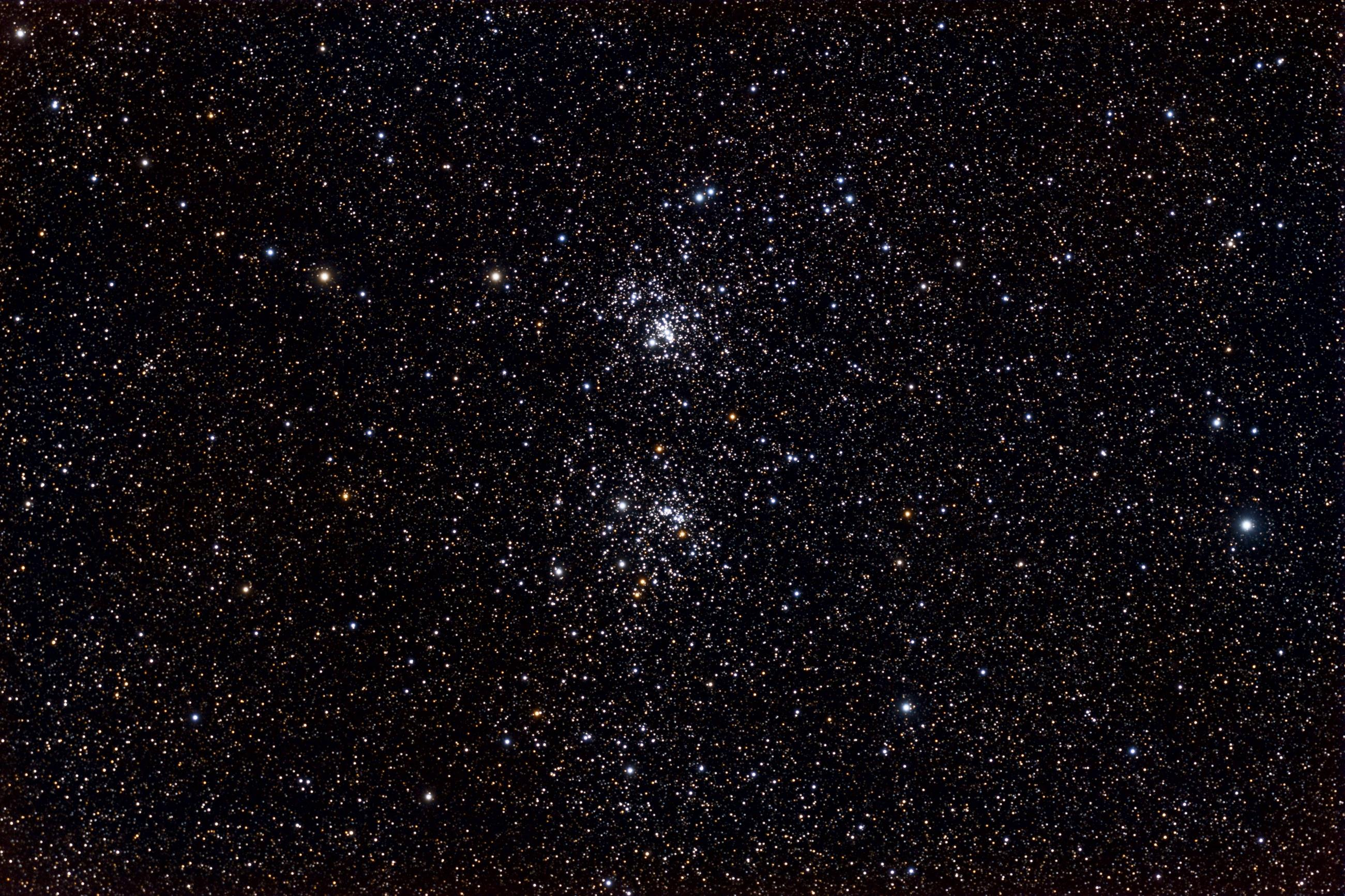
The Double Cluster. 9 Persei is the brightest star on right side of the image. North is to the left.

9 Persei is a single variable star in the northern constellation Perseus, located around 4,300 light years away from the Sun. It has the Bayer designation i Persei; 9 Persei is the Flamsteed designation. This body is visible to the naked eye as a faint, white-hued star with an apparent visual magnitude of about 5.2. It is moving closer to the Sun with a heliocentric radial velocity of −15.2 km/s. The star is a member of the Perseus OB1 association of co-moving stars.

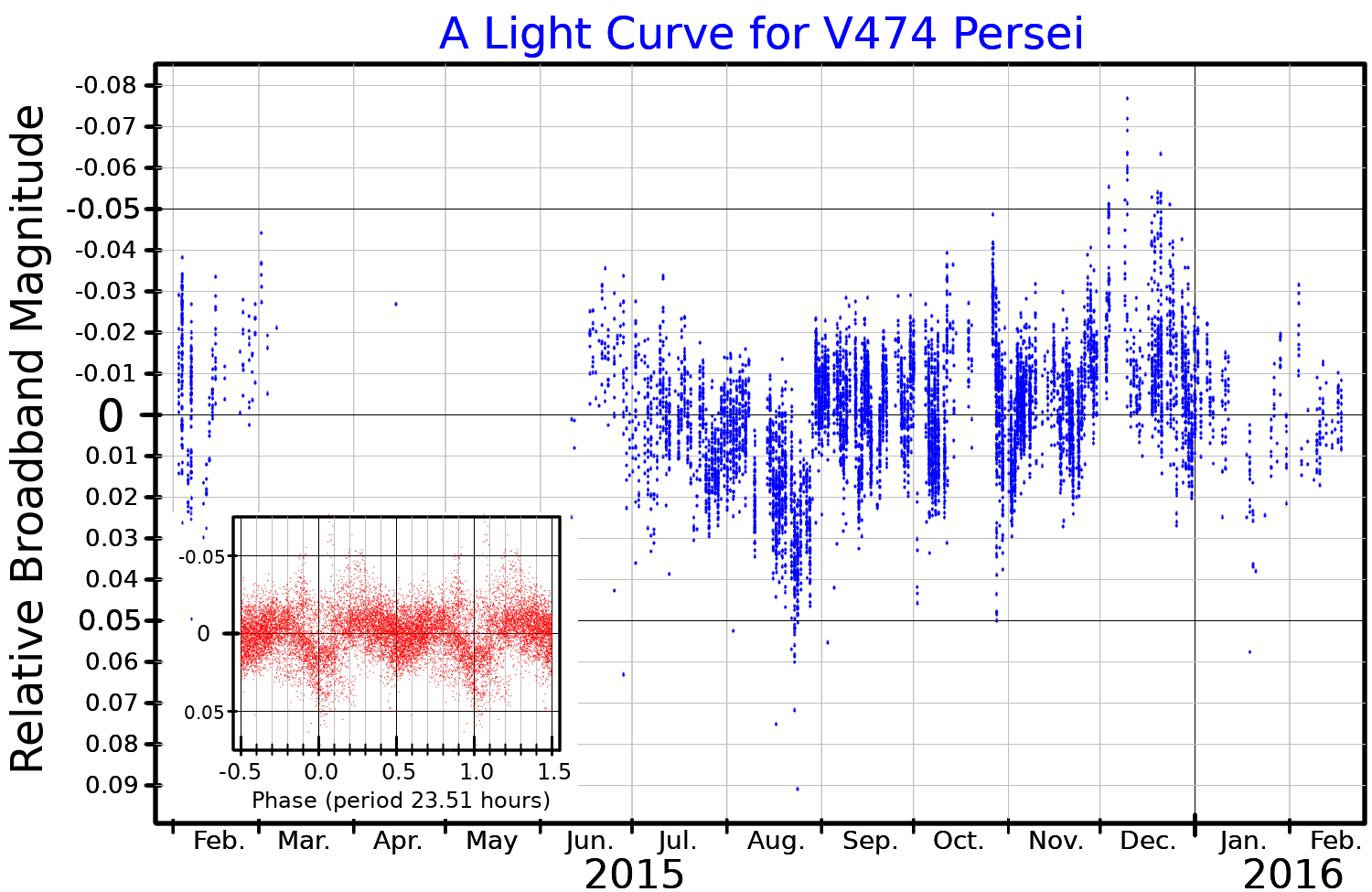
A light curve for V474 Persei. The main plot shows the variation over a year, and the inset plot shows the same data folded over the best-fit period. The data was published by Burggraaff et al. (2018)

This is a blue supergiant with a stellar classification of A2 Ia, a massive star that has used up its core hydrogen and is now fusing heavier elements. It is an Alpha Cygni variable (designated V474 Persei), a type of non-radial pulsating variable. It ranges in magnitude from 5.15 down to 5.25. The star has 10.5 times the mass of the Sun and has expanded to 89 times the Sun's radius. It is radiating over 12,000 times the luminosity of the Sun from its swollen photosphere at an effective temperature of 9,840 K.

9 Persei has one visual companion, designated component B, at an angular separation of 12.3″ and magnitude 12.0.
