= 16 Persei =

Star in the constellation Perseus

- Location of 16 Persei (circled)

Observation data Epoch J2000 Equinox ICRS
- Constellation: Perseus
- Right ascension: 02^{h} 50^{m} 35.05979^{s}
- Declination: 38° 19′ 07.1080″
- Apparent magnitude (V): 4.22

Characteristics
- Spectral type: F2III
- U−B color index: +0.08
- B−V color index: +0.34
- Variable type: δ Sct(?)

Astrometry
| Radial velocity (R_{v}) | +14.00 km/s |
| Proper motion (μ) | RA: +195.77 mas/yr Dec.: −109.98 mas/yr |
| Parallax (π) | 27.01±0.19 mas |
| Distance | 120.8 ± 0.8 ly (37.0 ± 0.3 pc) |
| Absolute magnitude (M_{V}) | 1.38 |

Details
| Mass | 1.80 M_{☉} |
| Radius | 3.2 R_{☉} |
| Luminosity | 23.36 L_{☉} |
| Surface gravity (log g) | 3.72 cgs |
| Temperature | 7,004 K |
| Metallicity [Fe/H] | −0.04 dex |
| Rotational velocity (v sin i) | 149 km/s |
| Age | 1.44 Gyr |

Other designations
- 16 Per, NSV 956, BD+37°646, FK5 2194, GC 3401, HD 17584, HIP 13254, HR 840, SAO 55928, CCDM J02506+3818A, LTT 10924

Database references
| SIMBAD | data |

16 Persei is a single, suspected variable star in the northern constellation of Perseus, located approximately 121 light years away based on parallax. It is visible to the naked eye as a yellow-white hued star with an apparent visual magnitude of 4.22. This object is moving further from the Earth with a heliocentric radial velocity of +14 km/s. It displays a relatively high proper motion, traversing the celestial sphere at the rate of 0.224″ per year.

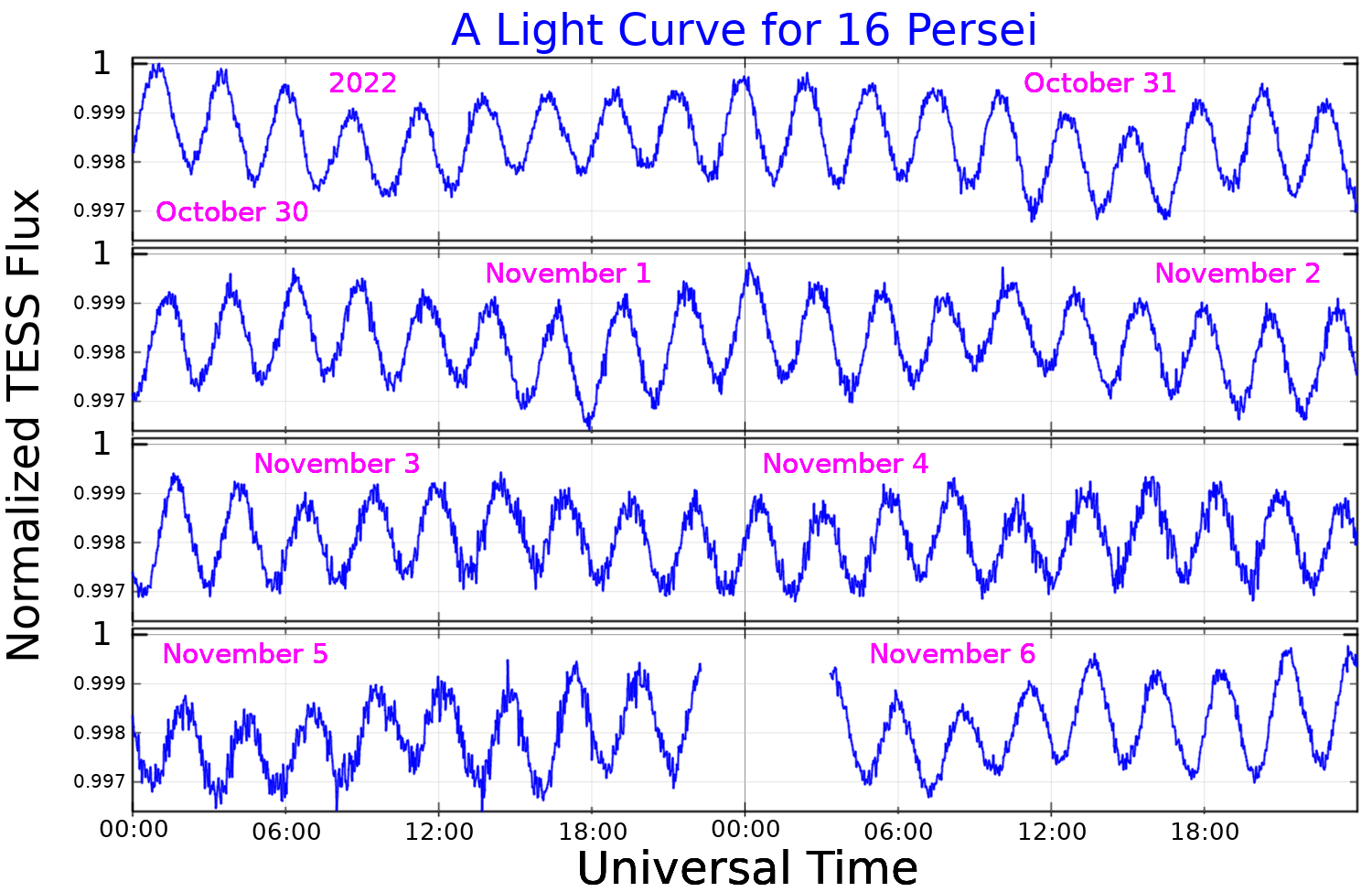
A light curve for 16 Persei, plotted from TESS data

Based upon a stellar classification of F2 III, this matches an aging giant star that has exhausted the hydrogen at its core and is evolving away from the main sequence. It is a possible pulsating Delta Scuti variable, although there is some uncertainty about this classification. However, Kunzli and North (1998) found no variation. The star is 1.44 billion years old with 1.8 times the mass of the Sun and 3.2 times the Sun's radius. It shows a high rotation rate with a projected rotational velocity of 149 km/s, which is causing an equatorial bulge that is an estimated 24% larger than the polar radius. 16 Persei is radiating 23 times the Sun's luminosity from its photosphere at an effective temperature of 7,004 K.

It has two reported visual companions: B, with a magnitude of 12.8 and separation of 76.7", and C, with magnitude 10.43 and separation 234".
