= List of stars in Hydrus =

This is the list of notable stars in the constellation Hydrus, sorted by decreasing brightness.

Name	B	Var	HD	HIP	RA	Dec	vis. mag.	abs. mag.	Dist. (ly)	Sp. class	Notes
β Hyi	β		2151	2021	00^{h} 25^{m} 39.20^{s}	−77° 15′ 18.1″	2.79	3.45	24	G2IV	suspected variable, V_{max} = 2.75^{m}, V_{min} = 2.81^{m}
α Hyi	α		12311	9236	01^{h} 58^{m} 45.87^{s}	−61° 34′ 11.7″	2.86	1.16	71	F0V	Head of Hydrus
γ Hyi	γ		24512	17678	03^{h} 47^{m} 14.23^{s}	−74° 14′ 21.3″	3.26	−0.83	214	M2III	Foo Pih; semiregular variable
δ Hyi	δ		15008	11001	02^{h} 21^{m} 45.02^{s}	−68° 39′ 33.9″	4.08	0.99	135	A3V	
ε Hyi	ε		16978	12394	02^{h} 39^{m} 35.22^{s}	−68° 16′ 01.0″	4.12	0.76	153	B9III	
η^{2} Hyi	η^{2}		11977	8928	01^{h} 54^{m} 56.01^{s}	−67° 38′ 50.9″	4.68	0.57	217	G5III	has a planet (b)
ν Hyi	ν		18293	13244	02^{h} 50^{m} 28.54^{s}	−75° 04′ 00.8″	4.76	−0.26	329	K3III	
ζ Hyi	ζ		17566	12876	02^{h} 45^{m} 32.53^{s}	−67° 37′ 00.2″	4.83	0.05	295	A2IV/V	
λ Hyi	λ		4815	3781	00^{h} 48^{m} 35.12^{s}	−74° 55′ 24.1″	5.09	1.10	205	K5III	
μ Hyi	μ		16522	11757	02^{h} 31^{m} 40.12^{s}	−79° 06′ 33.3″	5.27	0.51	292	G4III	
θ Hyi	θ		19400	14131	03^{h} 02^{m} 15.40^{s}	−71° 54′ 09.0″	5.51	−0.52	525	B8III/IV	
ι Hyi	ι		21024	15201	03^{h} 15^{m} 57.36^{s}	−77° 23′ 19.0″	5.51	3.17	96	F4IV-V	
π^{1} Hyi	π^{1}		14141	10418	02^{h} 14^{m} 14.50^{s}	−67° 50′ 29.6″	5.57	−1.21	739	M1III	suspected variable, V_{max} = 5.52^{m}, V_{min} = 5.58^{m}
π^{2} Hyi	π^{2}		14287	10513	02^{h} 15^{m} 28.56^{s}	−67° 44′ 46.8″	5.67	−0.11	468	K2III	
BN Hyi	ρ	BN	20313	14521	03^{h} 07^{m} 31.90^{s}	−78° 59′ 21.9″	5.70	1.26	248	F2II-III	δ Sct variable, ΔV = 0.02^{m}
HD 10615			10615	7921	01^{h} 41^{m} 47.95^{s}	−60° 47′ 21.3″	5.70	0.42	371	K2/K3III	
HD 8810			8810	6631	01^{h} 25^{m} 05.28^{s}	−64° 22′ 10.0″	5.92	−1.53	1009	M0III	
HD 1801			1801	1706	00^{h} 21^{m} 28.74^{s}	−77° 25′ 36.7″	5.96	−0.69	697	K3III	
HD 21722			21722	15968	03^{h} 25^{m} 36.25^{s}	−69° 20′ 11.7″	5.96	2.99	128	F3V	
κ Hyi	κ		15248	11095	02^{h} 22^{m} 52.47^{s}	−73° 38′ 45.0″	5.99	1.05	318	K0III	suspected variable
HD 9896			9896	7387	01^{h} 35^{m} 14.71^{s}	−58° 08′ 21.8″	6.03	3.00	132	F2V	
τ^{2} Hyi	τ^{2}		11604	8366	01^{h} 47^{m} 46.69^{s}	−80° 10′ 34.2″	6.05	2.09	202	F0III	
HD 11995			11995	8983	01^{h} 55^{m} 46.47^{s}	−60° 51′ 40.1″	6.07	2.73	152	F0IV/V	
HD 12477			12477	9318	01^{h} 59^{m} 41.08^{s}	−66° 03′ 59.7″	6.09	0.50	428	K2III	
HD 10042			10042	7271	01^{h} 33^{m} 39.26^{s}	−78° 30′ 16.1″	6.11	0.46	441	G3IV	
HD 19940			19940	14547	03^{h} 07^{m} 49.00^{s}	−69° 15′ 53.8″	6.12	1.30	300	K1III	
HD 21563			21563	15840	03^{h} 24^{m} 02.28^{s}	−69° 37′ 28.7″	6.14	−0.17	595	A4:V+...	
σ Hyi	σ		12363	8991	01^{h} 55^{m} 50.25^{s}	−78° 20′ 55.2″	6.15	3.07	135	F5/F6IV/V	
HD 10052			10052	7506	01^{h} 36^{m} 44.77^{s}	−58° 16′ 15.5″	6.18	−0.78	805	M3III	semiregular variable, V_{max} = 6.11^{m}, V_{min} = 6.23^{m}
CT Hyi		CT	24188	17543	03^{h} 45^{m} 23.70^{s}	−71° 39′ 29.7″	6.26	0.50	463	B8V	α^{2} CVn variable
τ^{1} Hyi	τ^{1}		10859	7879	01^{h} 41^{m} 21.29^{s}	−79° 08′ 53.7″	6.33	0.91	395	G6/G8III	
HD 12270			12270	9149	01^{h} 57^{m} 53.37^{s}	−65° 25′ 28.9″	6.36	0.28	535	G8II/III	
HD 11944			11944	8957	01^{h} 55^{m} 19.69^{s}	−60° 18′ 44.6″	6.43	2.73	179	F2V	
HD 1221			1221	1268	00^{h} 15^{m} 54.94^{s}	−75° 54′ 41.8″	6.49	−0.18	704	G8/K0III	
GJ 3021			1237	1292	00^{h} 16^{m} 12.68^{s}	−79° 51′ 04.3″	6.59	5.36	57	G8.5Vk	has a planet (b)
CN Hyi		CN	17653	12884	02^{h} 45^{m} 36.97^{s}	−71° 14′ 09.4″	6.66		195.8	F6V	W UMa variable
η^{1} Hyi	η^{1}		11733	8751	01^{h} 52^{m} 34.74^{s}	−67° 56′ 40.2″	6.77	−0.03	748	B9V	suspected variable
CH Hyi	(α)	CH	12853	9472	02^{h} 01^{m} 52.33^{s}	−74° 26′ 44.62″	6.87		2265		
HD 18050	(γ)		18050	13119	02^{h} 48^{m} 44.42^{s}	−73° 50′ 29.40″	6.94		924		suspected variable
HD 13950	(β)		10206	13950	02^{h} 11^{m} 17.63^{s}	−74° 30′ 04.93″	7.14		824		
HD 10180			10180	7599	01^{h} 37^{m} 53.58^{s}	−60° 30′ 41.5″	7.33	4.36	128	G1V	has six confirmed planets (c, d, e, f, g and h) and three unconfirmed planets (b, i and j)
HD 20003			20003	14530	03^{h} 07^{m} 38^{s}	−72° 19′ 19″	8.37		143	G8V	has two planets (b & c)
HD 19918		BT	19918	14026	03^{h} 00^{m} 37.09^{s}	−81° 54′ 07.3″	9.35		801	Ap...	rapidly oscillating Ap star
HD 2685			2685		00^{h} 29^{m} 19.0^{s}	−76° 18′ 15″	9.59		646	Ap...	has a planet (b)
WASP-126					04^{h} 13^{m} 30.0^{s}	−69° 13′ 37″	10.8		763	G2	has a transiting planet (b)
VW Hyi		VW			04^{h} 09^{m} 11.39^{s}	−71° 17′ 41.3″	14.4				SU UMa variable, V_{max} = 8.4^{m}, V_{min} = 14.4^{m}, P = 0.074271 d
SMSS J031300.36-670839.3					03^{h} 13^{m} 00.36^{s}	−67° 08′ 39.3″	14.7			K	oldest known star as of 2014
WX Hyi		WX			02^{h} 09^{m} 50.84^{s}	−63° 18′ 39.9″	14.85				SU UMa variable, V_{max} = 9.6^{m}, V_{min} = 14.85^{m}, P = 0.074813 d
BL Hyi		BL			01^{h} 41^{m} 00.38^{s}	−67° 53′ 27.4″	14.9			Am	AM Her variable and eclipsing binary, V_{max} = 14.3^{m}, V_{min} = 18.6^{m}, P = 0.078915 d
Table legend: • Name = Proper name • B = Bayer designation • F or/and G. = Flamsteed designation or Gould designation • Var = Variable star designation • HD = Henry Draper Catalogue designation number • HIP = Hipparcos Catalogue designation number • RA = Right ascension for the Epoch/Equinox J2000.0 • Dec = Declination for the Epoch/Equinox J2000.0 • vis. mag. = visual magnitude (m or m_{v}), also known as apparent magnitude • abs. mag. = absolute magnitude (M_{v}) • Dist. (ly) = Distance in light-years from Earth • Sp. class = Spectral class of the star in the stellar classification system • Notes = Common name(s) or alternate name(s); comments; notable properties [for example: multiple star status, range of variability if it is a variable star, exoplanets, etc.]

== See also ==
- List of stars by constellation
