= Hydrus in Chinese astronomy =

The modern constellation Hydrus is not included in the Three Enclosures and Twenty-Eight Mansions system of traditional Chinese uranography because its stars are too far south for observers in China to know about them prior to the introduction of Western star charts. Based on the work of Xu Guangqi and the German Jesuit missionary Johann Adam Schall von Bell in the late Ming Dynasty, this constellation has been classified under the 23 Southern Asterisms (近南極星區, Jìnnánjíxīngōu) with the names Snake's Tail (蛇尾, Shéwěi), Snake's Abdomen (蛇腹, Shéfù), Snake's Head (蛇首, Shéshǒu) and White Patched Nearby (附白, Fùbái).

The name of the western constellation in modern Chinese is 水蛇座 (shuǐ shé zuò), which means "the water snake constellation."

== Stars ==
The map of Chinese constellation in constellation Hydrus area consists of:

Four Symbols	Mansion (Chinese name)	Romanization	Translation	Asterisms (Chinese name)	Romanization	Translation	Western star name	Chinese star name	Romanization	Translation
-	近南極星區 (non-mansions)	Jìnnánjíxīngōu (non-mansions)	The Southern Asterisms (non-mansions)							
-	近南極星區 (non-mansions)	Jìnnánjíxīngōu (non-mansions)	The Southern Asterisms (non-mansions)	蛇尾	Shéwěi	Snake's Tail	β Hyi	蛇尾一	Shéwěiyī	1st star
-	近南極星區 (non-mansions)	Jìnnánjíxīngōu (non-mansions)	The Southern Asterisms (non-mansions)	蛇腹	Shéfù	Snake's Abdomen				
-	近南極星區 (non-mansions)	Jìnnánjíxīngōu (non-mansions)	The Southern Asterisms (non-mansions)	蛇腹	Shéfù	Snake's Abdomen	ζ Hyi	蛇腹一	Shéfùyī	1st star
-	近南極星區 (non-mansions)	Jìnnánjíxīngōu (non-mansions)	The Southern Asterisms (non-mansions)	蛇腹	Shéfù	Snake's Abdomen	ε Hyi	蛇腹二	Shéfùèr	2nd star
-	近南極星區 (non-mansions)	Jìnnánjíxīngōu (non-mansions)	The Southern Asterisms (non-mansions)	蛇腹	Shéfù	Snake's Abdomen	δ Hyi	蛇腹三	Shéfùsān	3rd star
-	近南極星區 (non-mansions)	Jìnnánjíxīngōu (non-mansions)	The Southern Asterisms (non-mansions)	蛇腹	Shéfù	Snake's Abdomen	η^{2} Hyi	蛇腹四	Shéfùsì	4th star
-	近南極星區 (non-mansions)	Jìnnánjíxīngōu (non-mansions)	The Southern Asterisms (non-mansions)	蛇首	Shéshǒu	Snake's Head	α Hyi	蛇尾一	Shéshǒuyī	1st star
-	近南極星區 (non-mansions)	Jìnnánjíxīngōu (non-mansions)	The Southern Asterisms (non-mansions)	附白	Fùbái	White Patches Nearby				
-	近南極星區 (non-mansions)	Jìnnánjíxīngōu (non-mansions)	The Southern Asterisms (non-mansions)	附白	Fùbái	White Patches Nearby	γ Hyi	附白一	Fùbáiyī	1st star
-	近南極星區 (non-mansions)	Jìnnánjíxīngōu (non-mansions)	The Southern Asterisms (non-mansions)	附白	Fùbái	White Patches Nearby	κ Hyi	附白二	Fùbáièr	2nd star

== See also ==
- Chinese astronomy
- Traditional Chinese star names
- Chinese constellations
