= Eta Hydri =

The Bayer designation Eta Hydri (η Hyi / η Hydri) is shared by two stars, in the constellation Hydrus:

- η^{1} Hydri, also HD 11733, a B-type main-sequence star
- η^{2} Hydri, also HD 11977, a G-type main-sequence star with an exoplanet (η^{2} Hydri b)
