= Hydrus (disambiguation) =

Hydrus is a small constellation in the southern sky.

Hydrus may also refer to:

- Hydrus (Chinese astronomy), constellations recognized in China
- Hydrus (legendary creature), a creature from Medieval bestiaries
- Hydrus (roller coaster), a Gerstlauer Euro-Fighter roller coaster at Casino Pier
- Hydrus (software), a software suite for simulating subsurface water flow
- SS Hydrus (1903), a Great Lakes freighter
- The 7th Colossus from Shadow of the Colossus
- Hydrus, the ancient name of Otranto

== See also ==
- Hydros (disambiguation)
