= NGC 802 =

Lenticular galaxy in the constrellation Hydrus

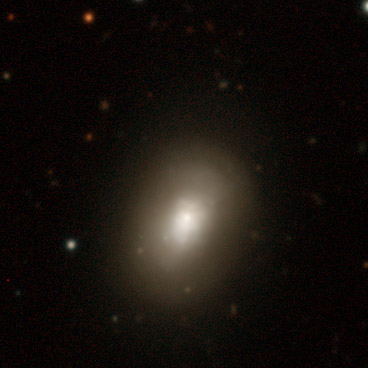
- legacy surveys image of NGC 802

Observation data (J2000 epoch)
- Constellation: Hydrus
- Right ascension: 01^{h} 59^{m} 05.96016^{s}
- Declination: −67° 52′ 12.1264″
- Redshift: 0.004954
- Heliocentric radial velocity: 1481.5 km/s
- Distance: 68.0 ± 4.8 Mly (20.84 ± 1.46 Mpc)
- Apparent magnitude (B): 14.17

Characteristics
- Type: SAB0^{+}(s) pec:

Other designations
- PGC 7505

NGC 802 is a lenticular galaxy in the constellation Hydrus. It is about 68 million light-years from the Milky Way and has a diameter of about 20,000 light years. NGC 802 was discovered on November 2, 1834 by the British astronomer John Herschel.

== See also ==
- List of NGC objects (1–1000)
