= PKS 0252−71 =

Radio galaxy in the constellation of Hydrus

PKS 0251−71
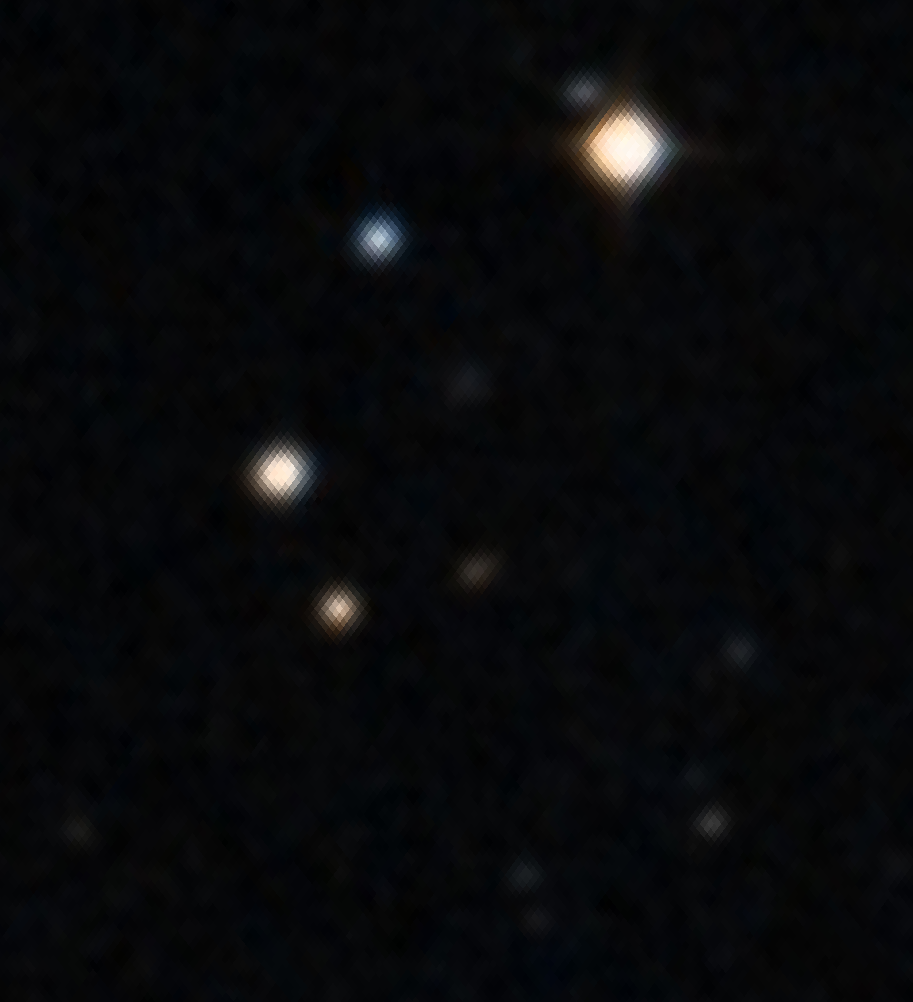
- The Radio galaxy PKS 0251−71

Observation data (J2000.0 epoch)
- Constellation: Hydrus
- Right ascension: 02^{h} 52^{m} 46.15^{s}
- Declination: −71° 04′ 35.26″
- Redshift: 0.562880
- Heliocentric radial velocity: 168,747 km/s
- Distance: 5.636 Gly
- Apparent magnitude (V): 19.0

Characteristics
- Type: NLRG

Other designations
- G4Jy 304, ICRF J025246.1−710435, LEDA 2823293, PAPER J042.83−71.00, PKS B0252−712, SUMSS J025246−710436

PKS 0252−71 is a radio galaxy located in the southern constellation of Hydrus. The redshift of the object is (z) 0.562 and it was first discovered by astronomers as an astronomical radio source in 1977 whom they associated it with two objects. Later in 1994, it was identified with a faint slightly resolved galaxy described to have emission lines in its spectrum.

== Description ==
PKS 0251−71 is classified as a narrow-line radio galaxy with a compact steep spectrum (CSS) source. The emission lines in its optical spectrum are found mainly rich in ionized chemical element abundances.

The radio source of PKS 0251−71 is found mainly compact with a symmetric structural appearance with the radio peaks having a separation gap of 145 milliarcseconds when imaged by Very Long Baseline Interferometry (VLBI). There are two resolved components containing 95% of the total flux density at 3.7 Jansky. There is absence of a radio core between the lobes. A study published in 2014, has found its X-ray spectrum is mainly faint with two components; one jet-related with a bright appearance and some traces of absorption.

The host galaxy of PKS 0251−71 is suggested to have an irregular halo structure surrounding it and also towards a companion galaxy that is located 33 kiloparsecs south from it. This suggest both galaxies are somehow interacting with each other. There is also presence of outflows from the galaxy but it is mainly confined to the edges of its radio lobes with its outflow radius only being half of its radio source.
