= NGC 813 =

Lenticular galaxy in the constrellation Hydrus

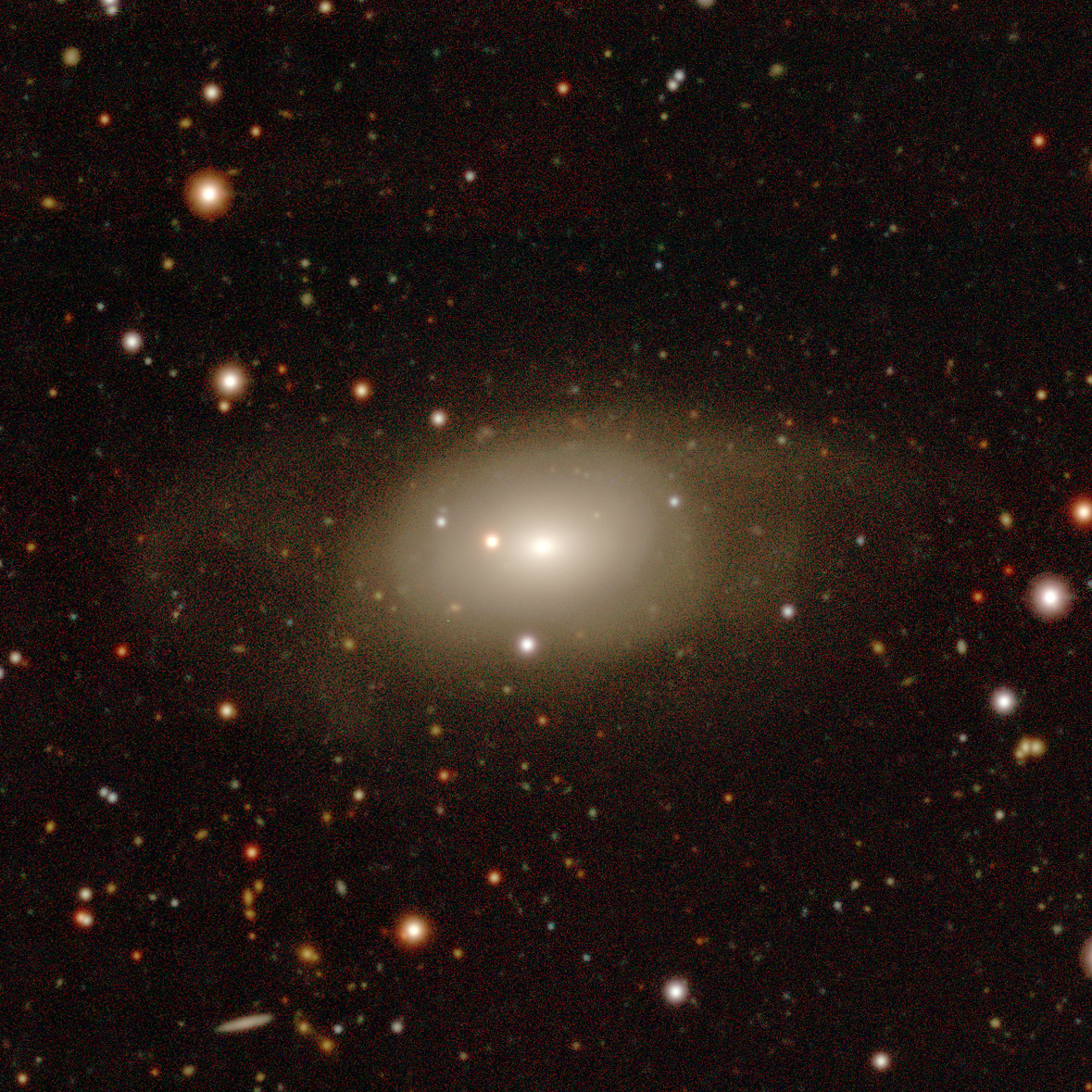
- legacy surveys image of NGC 813

Observation data (J2000 epoch)
- Constellation: Hydrus
- Right ascension: 02^{h} 01^{m} 36.113^{s}
- Declination: −68° 26′ 20.99″
- Redshift: 0.027219
- Heliocentric radial velocity: 8049 km/s
- Distance: 386.5 ± 27.1 Mly (118.50 ± 8.30 Mpc)
- Apparent magnitude (B): 13.84

Characteristics
- Type: SAB(r)0/a:

Other designations
- PGC 7692

NGC 813 is a lenticular galaxy in the constellation Hydrus. It is estimated to be 390 million light-years from the Milky Way and has a diameter of approximately 140,000 ly. NGC 813 was discovered on November 24, 1834, by the British astronomer John Herschel.

== Supernova ==
One supernova has been observed in NGC 813:

- SN 2020abzv (Type Ia, mag. 16.6), was discovered by ASAS-SN on 9 December 2020.

== See also ==
- List of NGC objects (1–1000)
