= NGC 1466 =

Globular star cluster in the constrellation Hydrus

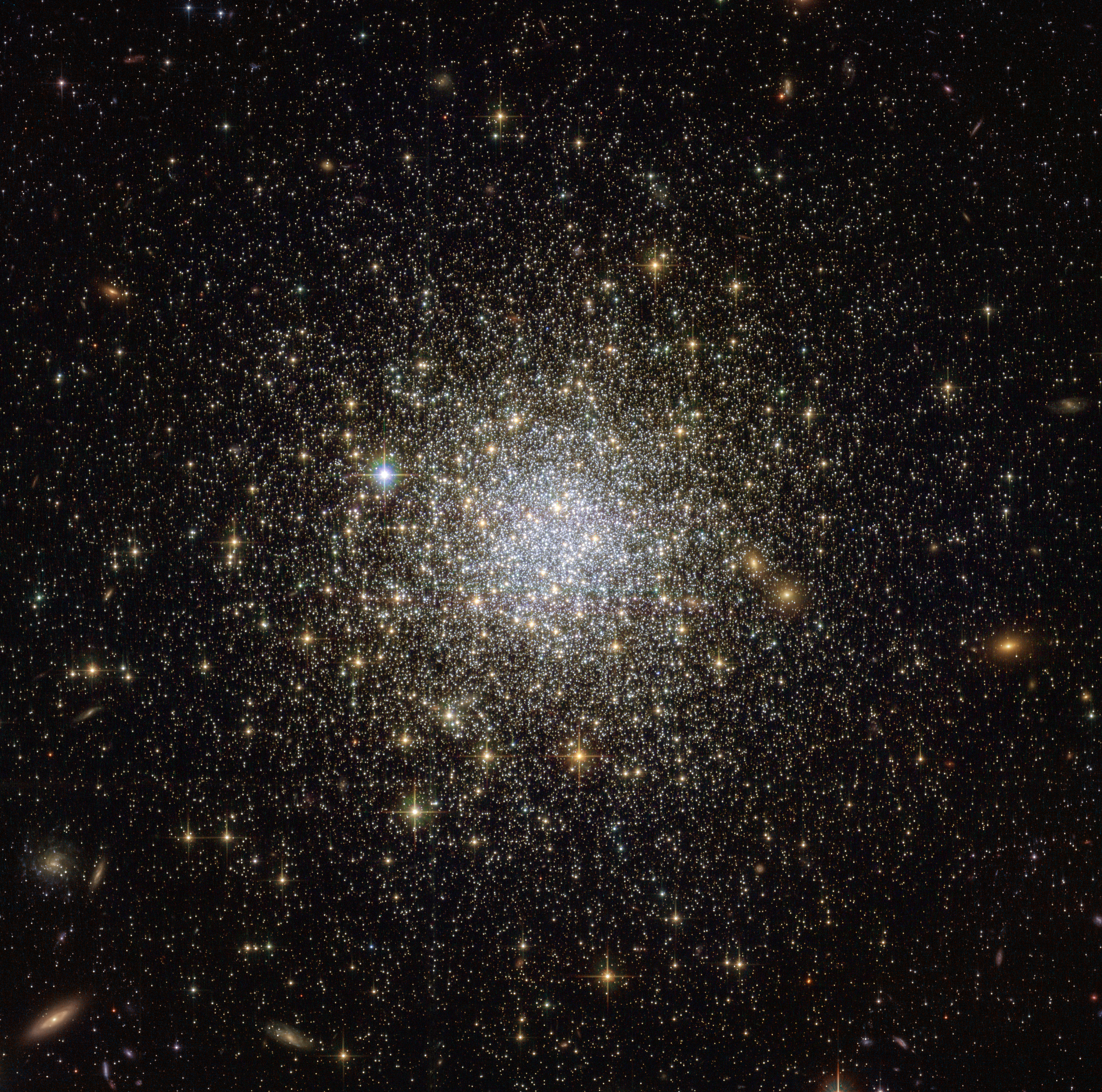

Observation data (J2000 epoch)
- Constellation: Hydrus
- Right ascension: 03^{h} 44^{m} 33^{s}
- Declination: −71° 40′ 17″
- Distance: 48.5 kpc (158 kly)
- Apparent magnitude (V): 11.4
- Apparent dimensions (V): 3.50′

Physical characteristics
- Mass: 1.4×10^{5} M_{☉}
- Metallicity: [Fe/H] = −1.60 dex
- Estimated age: 13.1 Gyr
- Other designations: SL1, LW1, ESO54SC16, KMHK1, PGC 2802621

NGC 1466 is the New General Catalogue designation for a globular cluster in the deep southern constellation of Hydrus. It is located in the outskirts of the Large Magellanic Cloud, which is a satellite galaxy of the Milky Way. The object was discovered November 26, 1834 by English astronomer John Herschel. John Dreyer described it as "pF, pS, iR, glbM, *7 f", meaning "pretty faint, pretty small, irregular round, gradually a little brighter middle, with a 7th magnitude star nearby". When using a small telescope, this is a "faint, small, unresolved and difficult" target with an angular size of 1.9 arc minutes. It has an integrated visual magnitude of 11.4.

This cluster has a reddening corrected distance modulus of 18.43±0.15, corresponding to a distance of 48.5 kpc. The cluster has a mass of about 140,000 times the mass of the Sun. It is an old cluster, having an estimated age of 13.1 billion years. In photographs, the cluster spans an apparent size of 3.50 arc minutes. The core radius has an angular size of 10.7±0.4 arc seconds, while the half-light radius is 24.3 arc seconds.

There are a total of 49 known and one candidate RR Lyrae variable stars in the cluster, as of 2011. Eight are RRd, or double-mode RR Lyrae variables. The average periods are 0.591 days for RR Lyrae type ab and 0.335 days for RR Lyrae type c. These are consistent with a classification of Oosterhoff-intermediate for the cluster. Twelve other variables have been identified, including two long-period variables and a Cepheid variable.
