= Nu Hydri =

Star in the constellation Hydrus

- Location of ν Hydri (circled)

Observation data Epoch J2000 Equinox ICRS
- Constellation: Hydrus
- Right ascension: 02^{h} 50^{m} 28.45915^{s}
- Declination: −75° 04′ 00.9969″
- Apparent magnitude (V): 4.76

Characteristics
- Spectral type: K3III
- U−B color index: +1.56
- B−V color index: +1.33

Astrometry
Radial velocity (R_{v})	+3.09±0.16 km/s
Proper motion (μ)	RA: −33.392 mas/yr Dec.: −27.286 mas/yr
Parallax (π)	9.8538±0.1433 mas
Distance	331 ± 5 ly (101 ± 1 pc)
Absolute magnitude (M_{V})	−0.33

Details
Mass	3.5 or 1.79 M_{☉}
Radius	21.23+3.23 −4.50 R_{☉}
Luminosity	183.8±3.2 L_{☉}
Surface gravity (log g)	3.30 cgs
Temperature	4,612+584 −315 K
Metallicity [Fe/H]	−1.52 dex
Rotation	50 d
Rotational velocity (v sin i)	1.3 km/s
Age	2.38 Gyr

Other designations
- ν Hyi, CPD−75°204, FK5 2199, GC 3463, HD 18293, HIP 13244, HR 872, SAO 255929

Database references
SIMBAD	data

ν Hydri, Latinized as Nu Hydri, is a single star in the southern circumpolar constellation of Hydrus. It is orange-hued and faintly visible to the naked eye with an apparent visual magnitude of 4.76. This object is located approximately 331 light years from the Sun based on parallax, and is drifting further away with a radial velocity of +3 km/s. It is a member of the Ursa Major Moving Group of stars that share a common motion through space.

This is an aging giant star with a stellar classification of K3III. With the supply of hydrogen at its core exhausted, the star has expanded and cooled. At present it has 21 times the girth of the Sun. It is 2.4 billion years old with estimates of its mass ranging from 1.8 to 3.5 times the mass of the Sun. The star is radiating 184 times the Sun's luminosity from its swollen photosphere at an effective temperature of 4,612 K.
