= HD 10180 c =

Extrasolar planet in the constrellation Hydrus

- Orbits of the inner planets of the HD 10180 planetary system, using the orbital configuration from an eight-body (the star and seven planets) Newtonian model taking into account tidal dissipation.

Discovery
- Discovery date: 24 August 2010

Orbital characteristics
- Semi-major axis: 0.0641 ± 0.0010 AU (9,590,000 ± 150,000 km)
- Eccentricity: 0.073±0.031
- Orbital period (sidereal): 5.75969±0.00028 d
- Average orbital speed: 136
- Argument of periastron: 328±24
- Star: HD 10180

Physical characteristics
- Mass: >0.0416±0.0014 M_{J}

HD 10180 c is an exoplanet approximately 130 light-years away in the constellation Hydrus. It was discovered in 2010 using the radial velocity method. With a minimum mass comparable to that of Neptune, it is of the class of planets known as Hot Neptunes. Dynamical simulations suggest that if the mass gradient was any more than a factor of two, the system would not be stable.

While planet c does not exist in any mean motion resonances, both planets with adjacent orbits (b and d) share near resonances with c.
