= Hydros =

Hydros may refer to:

- HYDROS (Hydrosphere State), a planned satellite mission and predecessor of the Soil Moisture Active Passive satellite, providing measurements of soil-moisture and freeze thaw state
- Hydros, a fictional ocean planet in The Face of the Waters by Robert Silverberg

== See also ==
- Hydrus (disambiguation)
