= NGC 1511 =

Galaxy in the constellation Hydrus

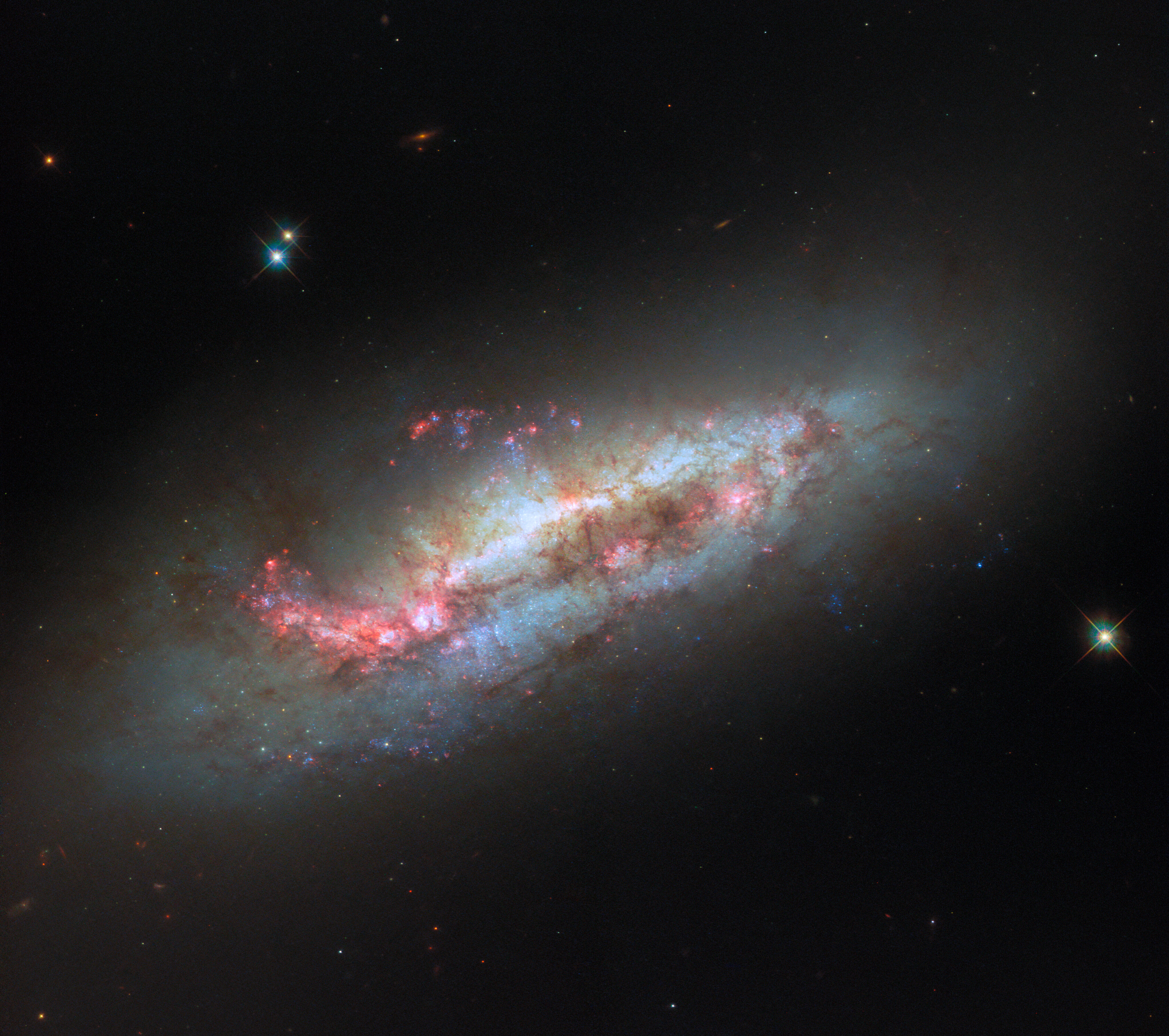
- NGC 1511 imaged by the Hubble Space Telescope

Observation data (J2000 epoch)
- Constellation: Hydrus
- Right ascension: 03^{h} 59^{m} 36.9554^{s}
- Declination: −67° 38′ 03.094″
- Redshift: 0.004474
- Heliocentric radial velocity: 1341 ± 5 km/s
- Distance: 64.4 ± 4.5 Mly (19.76 ± 1.39 Mpc)
- Group or cluster: NGC 1511 Group (LGG 107)
- Apparent magnitude (V): 11.3

Characteristics
- Type: SAa pec: HII
- Size: ~83,000 ly (25.45 kpc) (estimated)
- Apparent size (V): 3.5′ × 1.3′

Other designations
- ESO 055- G 004, IRAS 03594-6746, 2MASX J03593698-6738033, MCG +00-12-072, PGC 14236

NGC 1511 is a barred spiral galaxy in the constellation of Hydrus. Its velocity with respect to the cosmic microwave background is 1341 ± 5 km/s, which corresponds to a Hubble distance of 19.76 ± 1.39 Mpc (~64 million light-years). It was discovered by British astronomer John Herschel on 2 November 1834.

== Morphology ==
Eskridge, Frogel, and Pogge published a paper in 2002 describing the morphology of 205 closely spaced spiral or lenticular galaxies. The observations were made in the H-band of the infrared and in the B-band (blue). Eskridge and colleagues described NGC 1511 as:

Nearly edge-on. SW side of bulge is hidden by a prominent dust band, indicating that the bulge is small. Inner SE spiral arm has several very bright star-forming knots. Arms do not appear very extended (may be due to foreshortening), but there is an extended, featureless LSB [Low Surface Brightness] disk beyond the arms.

== NGC 1511 Group ==
According to A.M. Garcia, the galaxy NGC 1511 is the central member of the NGC 1511 group (also known as LGG 107) that includes NGC 1473 and NGC 1511A. Some sources also include the galaxy ESO 54-21 in this group.

== Supernova ==
One supernova has been observed in NGC 1511: SN 1935C (type unknown, mag. 12.5). The supernova was discovered by Emily Hughes Boyce on 16 August 1935, and was initially thought to be either a supernova, or a nova associated with the Large Magellanic Cloud. It was classified as a nova, and known as either HV 11970 or Nova Hydri 1935. In September 1988, Sidney Van den Bergh and Martha L. Hazen concluded definitively that the object was a supernova in NGC 1511, and the star was given the designation SN 1935C.

== Image gallery ==
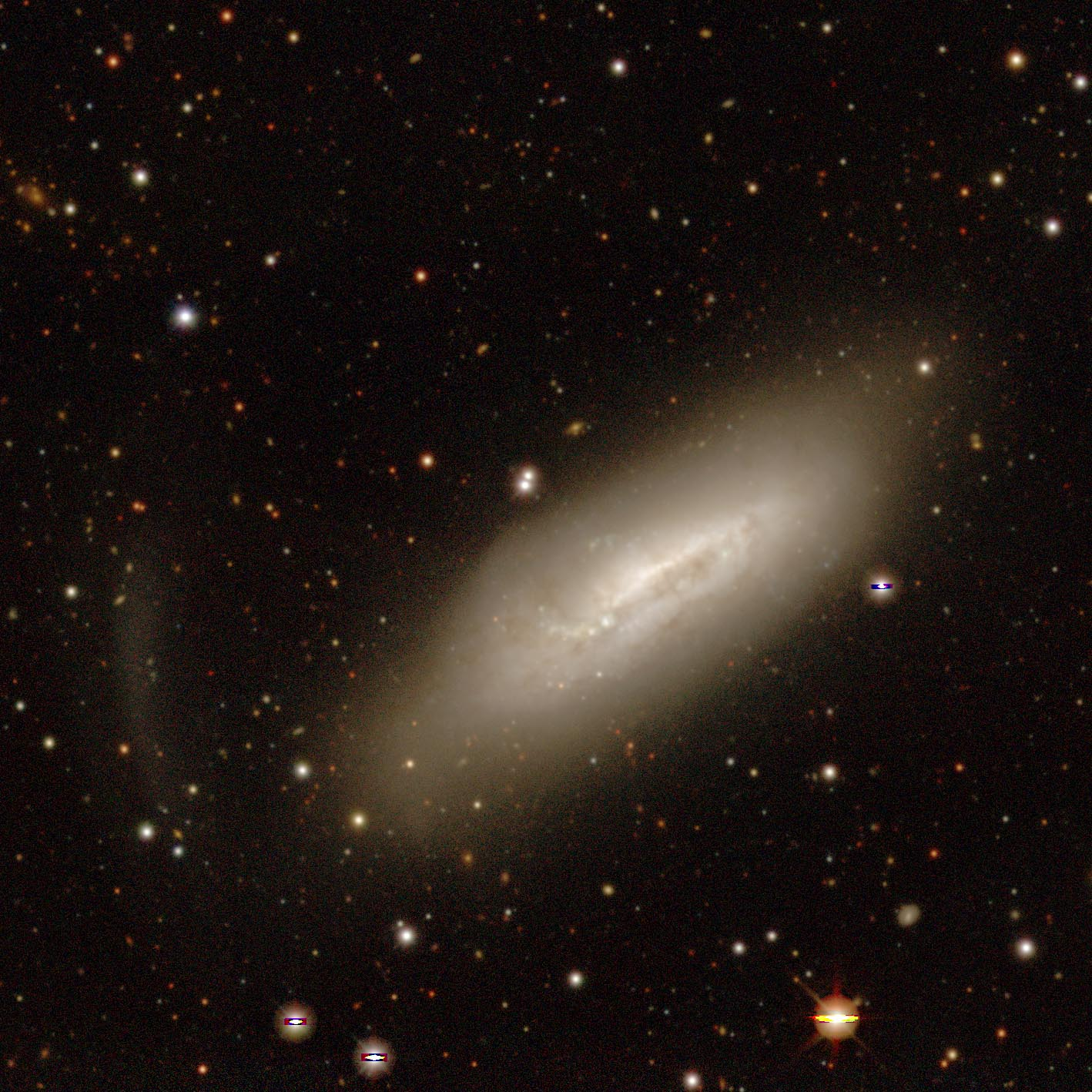
NGC 1511 imaged by Legacy Surveys

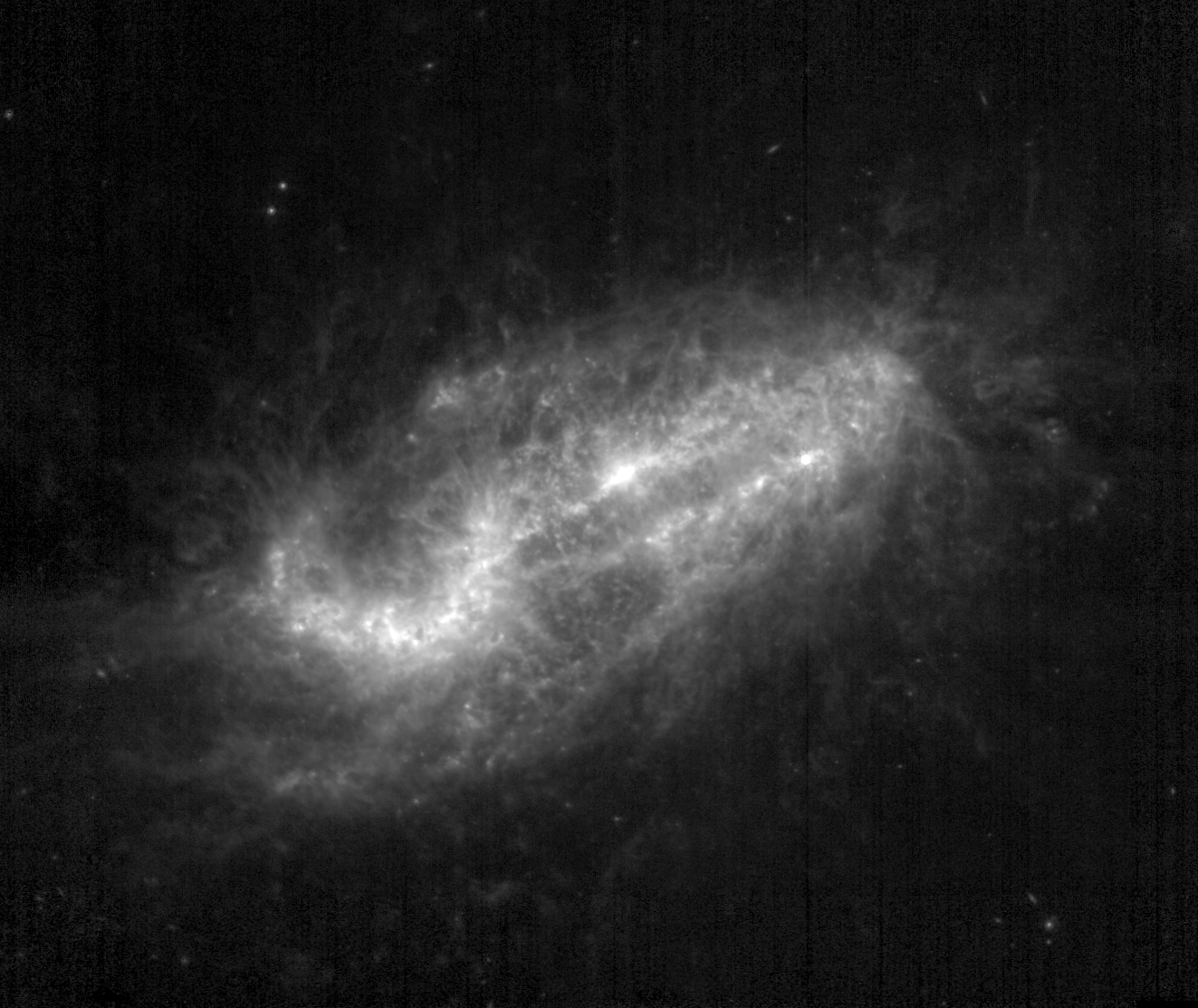
NGC 1511 imaged by the James Webb Space Telescope

== See also ==
- List of NGC objects (1001–2000)
