= Beta Hydri =

Brightest star of the constellation Hydrus

β Hydri
- Location of β Hydri (circled)

Observation data Epoch J2000 Equinox ICRS
- Constellation: Hydrus
- Right ascension: 00^{h} 25^{m} 45.07036^{s}
- Declination: −77° 15′ 15.2860″
- Apparent magnitude (V): 2.80

Characteristics
- Spectral type: G2 IV
- U−B color index: +0.11
- B−V color index: +0.62

Astrometry
Radial velocity (R_{v})	+22.4 km/s
Proper motion (μ)	RA: +2,219.54 mas/yr Dec.: +324.09 mas/yr
Parallax (π)	134.07±0.11 mas
Distance	24.33 ± 0.02 ly (7.459 ± 0.006 pc)
Absolute magnitude (M_{V})	3.45 ± 0.01

Details
Mass	1.107±0.009 M_{☉}
Radius	1.831±0.009 R_{☉}
Luminosity	3.45±0.10 L_{☉}
Surface gravity (log g)	3.97±0.04 cgs
Temperature	5,917±25 K
Metallicity [Fe/H]	−0.12±0.02 dex
Rotation	23.0±0.8 days
Rotational velocity (v sin i)	6.0 km/s
Age	6.1—7.5 Gyr

Other designations
- β Hyi, CD−77 15, CPD−77 16, FK5 11, GJ 19, HD 2151, HIP 2021, HR 98, SAO 255670, LFT 43, LHS 6, LPM 22, LTT 226, PLX 69

Database references
SIMBAD	data

Beta Hydri (β Hyi, β Hydri) is a star in the southern circumpolar constellation of Hydrus. (Note that Hydrus is not the same as Hydra.) With an apparent visual magnitude of 2.8, this is the brightest star in the constellation. Based upon parallax measurements the distance to this star is about 24.33 light-years (7.46 parsecs).

At a distance of 13°, it is the closest easily visible star to the south celestial pole, and around 150 BC it was within two degrees of it, which made it the southern pole star.

== Characteristics ==
The spectrum of this star matches a stellar classification of G2 IV, with the luminosity class of 'IV' indicating this is a subgiant star. As such, it is a slightly more evolved star than the Sun, with the supply of hydrogen at its core becoming exhausted. Around 113% of the mass of the Sun, it has expanded to 184% of the Sun's radius, with more than three times the Sun's luminosity. It is one of the oldest stars in the solar neighborhood, with an age between 6.1 and 7.5 billion years. This star bears some resemblance to what the Sun might look like in the far distant future, making it an object of interest to astronomers.

Beta Hydri has a strong magnetic field, which is not common for evolved stars that lost most of it during their main sequence phase. It is believed that during the subgiant phase, the star temporarily re-established a large magnetic field.

== Search for planets ==
In 2002, Endl et al. inferred the possible presence of an unseen companion orbiting Beta Hydri as hinted by a radial velocity linear trend with a periodicity exceeding 20 years. A substellar object such as a planet with a minimum mass of 4 Jupiter masses and orbital separation of roughly 8 AU could explain the observed trend. If confirmed, it would be a true Jupiter-analogue, though 4 times more massive. So far no planetary/substellar object has been certainly detected.

These results were not confirmed in CES and HARPS measurements published in 2012. Instead, the long-term radial velocity variations may be caused by the star's magnetic cycle. Similarly, a 2023 study detected long-period radial velocity variations that were attributed to stellar activity.

== See also ==
- List of nearest bright stars
- List of nearest G-type stars
