= Epsilon Hydri =

Star in the constellation Hydrus

ε Hydri
- Location of ε Hydri (circled)

Observation data Epoch J2000 Equinox ICRS
- Constellation: Hydrus
- Right ascension: 02^{h} 39^{m} 35.36121^{s}
- Declination: −68° 16′ 01.0103″
- Apparent magnitude (V): 4.12

Characteristics
- Evolutionary stage: main sequence
- Spectral type: B9 Va
- U−B color index: −0.14
- B−V color index: −0.06

Astrometry
Radial velocity (R_{v})	+13.6±0.9 km/s
Proper motion (μ)	RA: +87.30 mas/yr Dec.: +0.09 mas/yr
Parallax (π)	21.48±0.09 mas
Distance	151.8 ± 0.6 ly (46.6 ± 0.2 pc)
Absolute magnitude (M_{V})	+0.78

Details
Mass	2.64 M_{☉}
Radius	2.2 R_{☉}
Luminosity	60 L_{☉}
Surface gravity (log g)	4.33 cgs
Temperature	10,970±373 K
Rotational velocity (v sin i)	96 km/s
Age	133 Myr

Other designations
- ε Hyi, CPD−68°161, FK5 95, GC 3240, HD 16978, HIP 12394, HR 806, SAO 248621

Database references
SIMBAD	data

Epsilon Hydri, Latinized from ε Hydri, is a single, blue-white hued star in the southern constellation of Hydrus. It is a faint star with an apparent visual magnitude of 4.12, but it can be seen with the naked eye. Measurements made by the Hipparcos spacecraft showed an annual parallax shift of 21.48 mas, which provides a distance estimate of 152 light years. The star is moving away from the Sun with a radial velocity of +13.6 km/s. It is a member of the Tucana-Horologium moving group, an association of stars that share a common motion through space.

The stellar classification for this star is B9 Va, indicating that is it a B-type main-sequence star that is generating energy through hydrogen fusion at its core. It is a young star, just 133 million years in age, and has a high rate of spin with a projected rotational velocity of 96 km/s. This is giving the star a mild oblate shape with an equatorial bulge that is 5% greater than the polar radius. Epsilon Hydri has an estimated 2.64 times the mass of the Sun and 2.2 times the Sun's radius. It is radiating 60 times the Sun's luminosity from its photosphere at an effective temperature of around 10,970 K.
