= HD 10180 =

Star in the constellation Hydrus

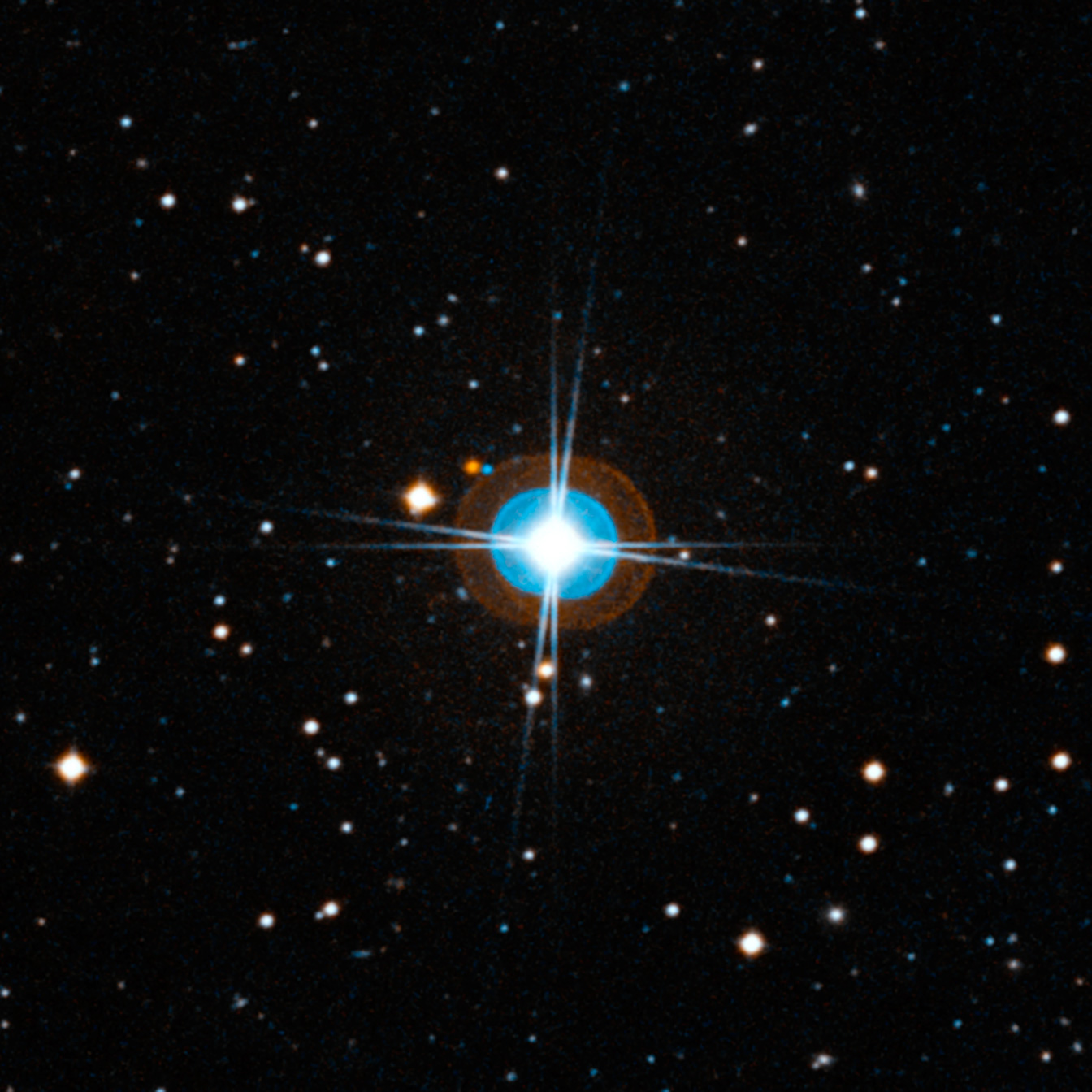
- View of the sky around the star HD 10180 (center); Credit: ESO

Observation data Epoch J2000 Equinox ICRS
- Constellation: Hydrus
- Right ascension: 01^{h} 37^{m} 53.57724^{s}
- Declination: −60° 30′ 41.4821″
- Apparent magnitude (V): 7.33

Characteristics
- Evolutionary stage: Main sequence
- Spectral type: G1V

Astrometry
Radial velocity (R_{v})	+35.44±0.12 km/s
Proper motion (μ)	RA: −14.303±0.017 mas/yr Dec.: +8.058±0.016 mas/yr
Parallax (π)	25.6611±0.0146 mas
Distance	127.10 ± 0.07 ly (38.97 ± 0.02 pc)
Absolute magnitude (M_{V})	+4.37

Details
Mass	1.062+0.027 −0.024 M_{☉}
Radius	1.20+0.05 −0.06 R_{☉}
Luminosity	1.64±0.02 L_{☉}
Surface gravity (log g)	4.39 cgs
Temperature	5,911 K
Metallicity [Fe/H]	+0.08 dex
Rotation	24±3 d
Rotational velocity (v sin i)	< 3 km/s
Age	4.3 Gyr

Other designations
- 2MASS J01375356-6030414, CD−61°285, HD 10180, HIP 7599, SAO 248411

Database references
SIMBAD	data
Exoplanet Archive	data

HD 10180 is a Sun-like star in the southern constellation Hydrus that is notable for its large planetary system. Since its discovery, at least six exoplanets have been observed orbiting it, and some studies have proposed up to nine potential planets, which would make it potentially the largest of all known planetary systems, including the Solar System.

== Characteristics ==
Based upon parallax measurements, it is located at a distance of 127 light-years (39 parsecs) from Earth. The apparent visual magnitude of this star is 7.33, which is too faint to be viewed with the naked eye although it can be readily observed with a small telescope. At a declination of −60°, this star cannot be seen at latitudes north of the tropics.

HD 10180 is a G-type main-sequence star, and thus generates energy at its core through the thermonuclear fusion of hydrogen. The mass of this star is estimated as 6% greater than the Sun's mass, it has a radius of 120% that of the Sun, and is radiating 149% of the Sun's luminosity. The effective temperature of the star's chromosphere is 5,911 K, giving it a yellow-hued glow like the Sun. HD 10180 has a 20% higher abundance of elements other than hydrogen/helium compared to the Sun. (Note: For [Fe/H] equal to 0.08, the proportion is given by: 10^{0.08} = 1.20 or 120%.) With an estimated age of 7.3 billion years, it is a stable star with no significant magnetic activity. The estimated period of rotation is about 24 days.

A survey in 2015 ruled out the existence of any stellar companions at projected distances from 13 to 324 astronomical units.

== Planetary system ==
On August 24, 2010, a research team led by Christophe Lovis of the University of Geneva announced that the star has at least five planets, and possibly as many as seven. The planets were detected using the HARPS spectrograph, in conjunction with the ESO's 3.6 m telescope at La Silla Observatory in Chile, using Doppler spectroscopy.

The HD 10180 planetary system
Companion (in order from star)	Mass	Semimajor axis (AU)	Orbital period (days)	Eccentricity	Inclination (°)	Radius
b (unconfirmed)	≥1.3±0.8 M_{🜨}	0.0222±0.0011	1.17766+0.00021 −0.00022	0.05+0.49 −0.05	—	—
c	≥13.2±0.4 M_{🜨}	0.06412±0.00101	5.75969±0.00028	0.073±0.031	>0.2841	—
i (unconfirmed)	≥1.9+1.6 −1.8 M_{🜨}	0.0904+0.0043 −0.0047	9.655+0.022 −0.072	0.05+0.23 −0.05	—	—
d	≥12.0±0.7 M_{🜨}	0.12859±0.00202	16.3570±0.0038	0.131±0.052	>0.2005	—
e	≥25.6±1.0 M_{🜨}	0.2699±0.0043	49.748±0.025	0.051±0.033	>0.2366	—
j (unconfirmed)	≥5.1+3.1 −3.2 M_{🜨}	0.330+0.017 −0.016	67.55+0.68 −0.88	0.07+0.12 −0.07	—	—
f	≥19.4±1.2 M_{🜨}	0.4929±0.0078	122.744±0.232	0.119±0.054	>0.3028	—
g	≥23.3±4.4 M_{🜨}	1.427±0.028	615	0.15±0.10	>0.3663	—
h	≥46.3±3.4 M_{🜨}	3.381±0.121	2500	0.095±0.086	>0.5496	—

On April 5, 2012, astronomer Mikko Tuomi of the University of Hertfordshire submitted a paper to Astronomy and Astrophysics approved for publishing on April 6, 2012 that proposed a nine-planet model for the system. Re-analysing the data using Bayesian probability analysis, previously known planets' parameters were revised and further evidence was found for the innermost planet (b) as well as evidence of two additional planets (i and j).

Subsequent studies since 2014 have found that a six-planet model is the best fit to the data. The system is not known to be a transiting planetary system, and as such planets are unlikely to be detected or verified by the transit method.

Animation of the planetary system

In 2017, an orbital simulation showed that the formation of dynamically stable families of comets in the HD 10180 system is unlikely. The identified reason for the instability of cometary orbits was the location of the most massive planet HD 10180 h in the outermost orbit.

=== Orbital arrangement ===
Orbits of the HD 10180 planetary system, using the orbital configuration from an eight-body (the star and seven planets) Newtonian model taking into account tidal dissipation (Note: The parameters are taken from the Newtonian fit taking into account tidal dissipation given in table 6 of Lovis et al. (2010). A purely Keplerian solution with slightly different parameters is given in table 3 of the same paper.)

The system contains six planets with minimum masses from 12 to 46 times Earth's (ranging in mass from roughly Uranus to sub-Saturn) at orbital radii of 0.06, 0.13, 0.27, 0.49, 1.43 and 3.38 AU. In the Solar System this set of orbits would fit within the main asteroid belt.

There are no planets known to be in mean-motion resonances, although the system has a number of near resonances including 3c:2i:1d and 3e:2j:1f. The approximate ratios of periods of adjacent orbits are (proceeding outward): 1:5, 1:3, 1:3, 2:5, 1:5, 3:11.

Since the inclination of the planets' orbits is unknown, only minimum planetary masses can presently be obtained. Dynamical simulations suggest that the system cannot be stable if the true masses of the planets exceed the minimum masses by a factor of greater than three (corresponding to an inclination of less than 20°, where 90° is edge-on). A 2020 study set upper limits on the masses of the confirmed planets based on non-detections in Gaia astrometry: planet c is <8.626 M_{J}, planet d is <10.37 M_{J}, planet e is <20.44 M_{J}, planet f is <14.03 M_{J}, planet g is <10.62 M_{J}, and planet h is <22.63 M_{J}. While some of these upper limits are in the mass range of brown dwarfs, it is likely that the true masses are significantly smaller.

=== Planets ===
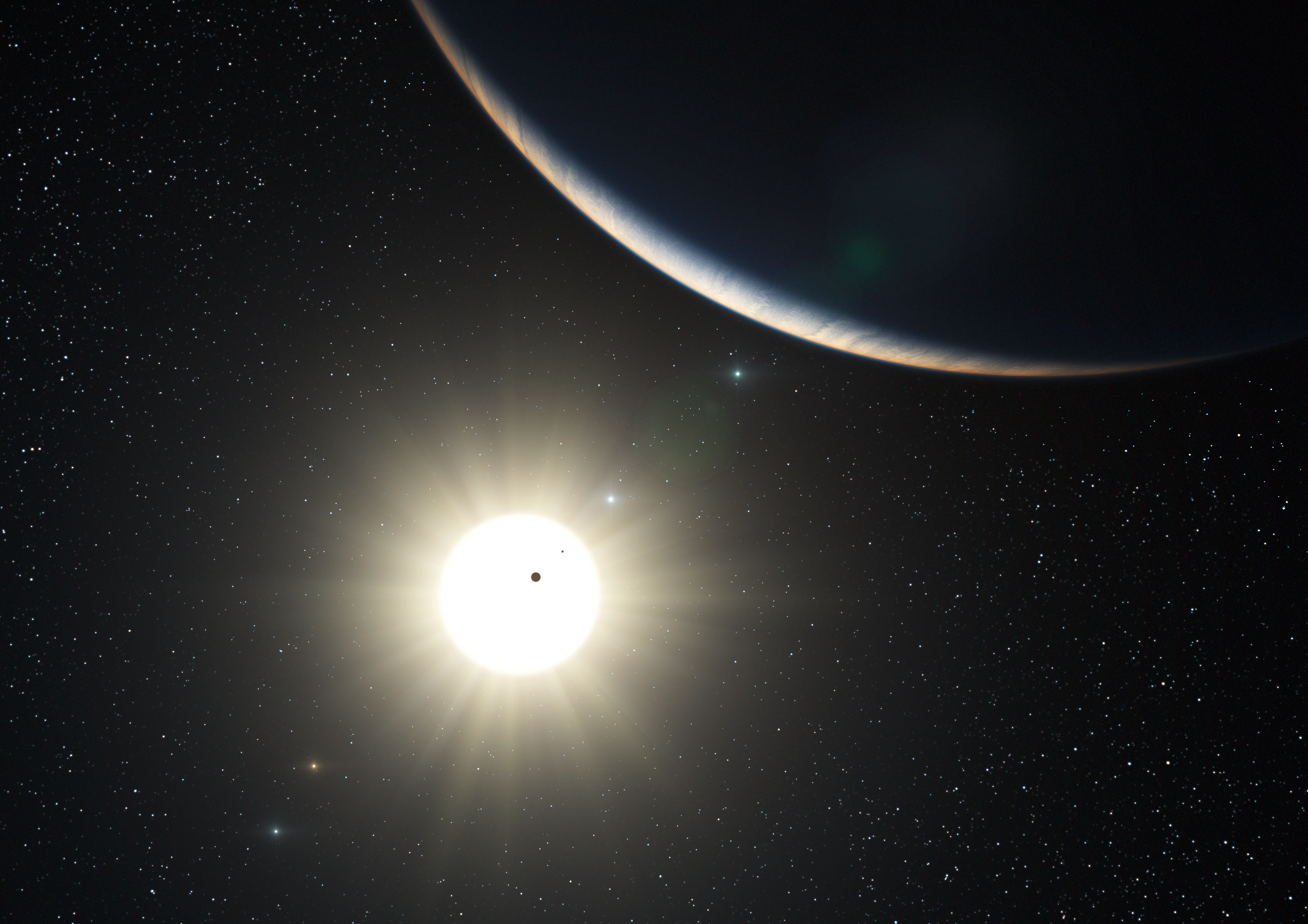
Artist's impression of HD 10180 d. Also depicted are planets b and c in transit.

HD 10180 b is a possible Earth-sized planet (minimum mass 1.3 times Earth's) located at 0.02 AU. Its orbital radius was originally estimated to have a near-circular orbit at a distance of 0.02225 ± 0.00035 AU (closer than Mercury, about one-seventh the distance and correspondingly hotter), taking 1.1 days to complete a full orbit. The estimated parameters of planet b were revised in 2012 with a slightly smaller orbital radius and a more eccentric orbit. The false detection probability was initially 1.4%; its probability was improved by Mikko Tuomi in 2012, but it was not confirmed by subsequent studies, such as Kane in 2014.

HD 10180 c, with a minimum mass comparable to that of Uranus, is a hot Neptune. Dynamical simulations suggest that if the mass gradient was any more than a factor of two, the system would not be stable. Its orbital period and eccentricity were originally estimated at 5.75979 ± 0.00062 and 0.045 ± 0.026 respectively; however, these were revised in 2012 in favour of a more eccentric orbit. The false detection probability is less than 0.1%.

HD 10180 i is a possible but unconfirmed hot super-Earth claimed by Mikko Tuomi in 2012. Subsequent studies have not confirmed it.

HD 10180 d is a hot Neptune. Its mass was initially estimated at >11.75 ± 0.65 Earth masses (smaller than Uranus) and on a slightly eccentric orbit; however, this was re-estimated with a larger mass and less eccentric orbit in 2012.

HD 10180 e is thought to be a hot Neptune with about twice the mass of Neptune. Its estimated orbital distance and eccentricity were downscaled in 2012. The false detection probability is less than 0.1%.

HD 10180 j is a possible but unconfirmed hot super-Earth or gas dwarf claimed by Mikko Tuomi in 2012. Subsequent studies have not confirmed it.

HD 10180 f is a hot Neptune and similar in mass to HD 10180 e. At an orbital distance of 0.49 AU and eccentricity of 0.12, its orbit is analogous to that of Mercury with a similar black-body-temperature range, though with its high mass, any greenhouse effect caused by an atmosphere would give it searing Venus-like or greater temperatures. Its estimated orbital distance and eccentricity were downscaled slightly in 2012. The false detection probability is less than 0.1%.

HD 10180 g is a giant planet with a mass larger than Neptune's. It has a significantly eccentric orbit at 1.4 AU and either crosses the system's predicted habitable zone or lies within it though it does not fit current models for planetary habitability due to its large mass (at least 23 times Earth). If it is a gas giant, it is likely of Sudarsky Class II. There is a possibility that a natural satellite with sufficient atmospheric pressure could have liquid water on its surface. Its estimated orbital distance and eccentricity were downscaled in 2012 but remains in the habitable zone. The false detection probability is less than 0.1%.

HD 10180 h is the largest and outermost known planet in the system. Originally, it was thought to be a Saturn-sized giant planet with a minimum mass 65 times that of Earth, though this minimum mass has since been revised downward to 46 Earth masses. Orbiting at 3.4 AU, a distance comparable to the distance of the outer part of the asteroid belt from the Sun and as such it is likely a Sudarsky Class I planet. The spurious detection probability is 0.6%.

== See also ==
- Kepler-90, a star with eight known planets (the first known to have an equal number of planets as the Solar System).
- TRAPPIST-1, a star with seven known planets.
- HD 163296, a star with four confirmed planets and many more planet candidates.
