= GJ 3021 b =

Extrasolar planet in the constrellation Hydrus

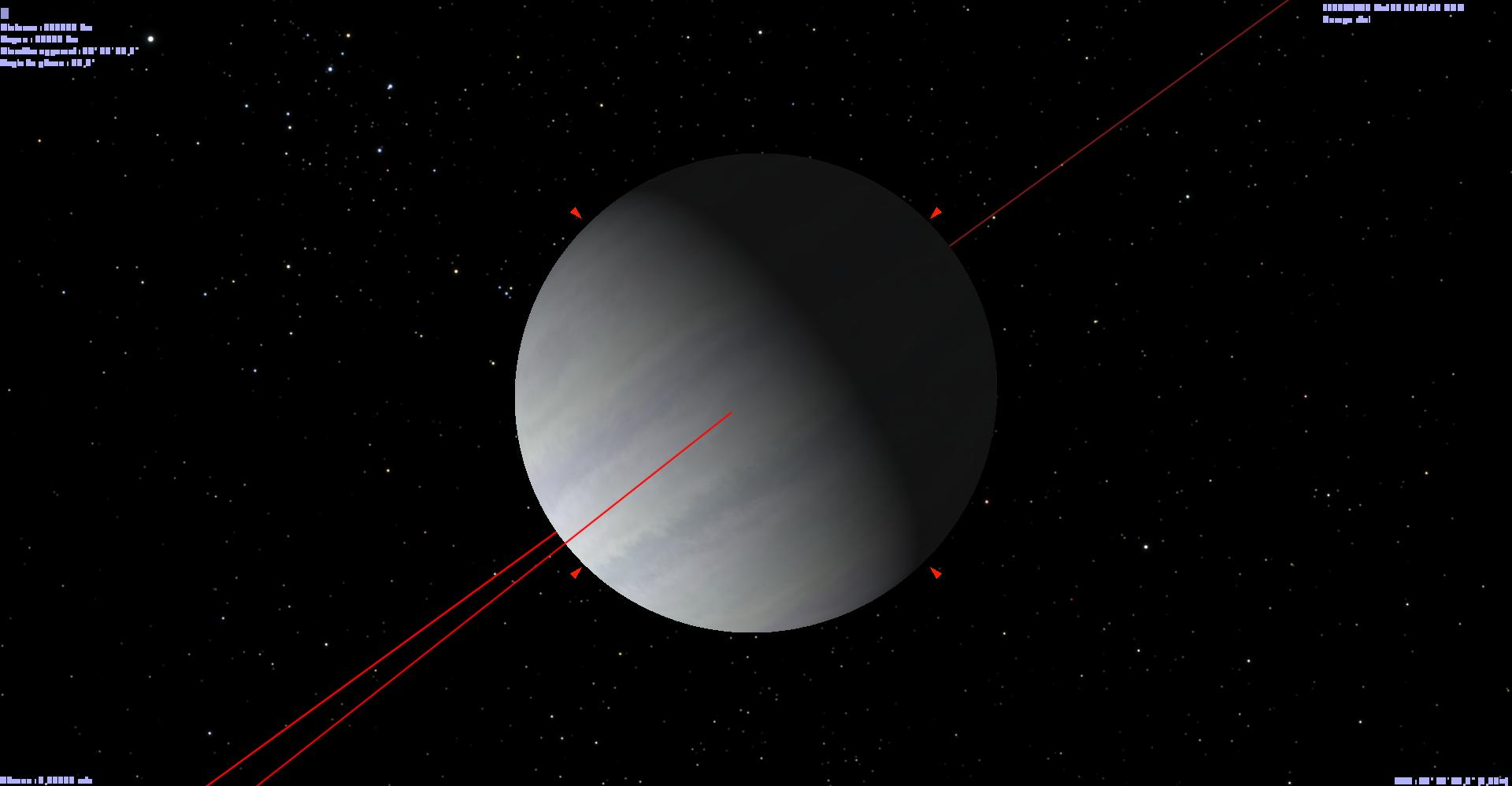
- GJ 3021 b

Discovery
- Discovered by: Naef, Mayor, Queloz
- Discovery site: EULER, La Silla, Chile
- Discovery date: 25 January 2000
- Detection method: Radial velocity

Orbital characteristics
- Semi-major axis: 0.495 AU (74,100,000 km)
- Eccentricity: 0.511 ± 0.017
- Orbital period (sidereal): 133.71 ± 0.20 d
- Time of periastron: 2,451,545.86 ± 0.64
- Argument of periastron: 290.7 ± 3.0
- Semi-amplitude: 167.0 ± 4.0
- Star: GJ 3021

GJ 3021 b, also known as Gliese 3021 b or HD 1237 b, is an extrasolar planet approximately 57 light-years away, orbiting its bright G-dwarf parent star in the Southern constellation of Hydrus. It was discovered with the Swiss Euler Telescope at the Chilean La Silla Observatory in 2000.

As determined by doppler spectroscopy, the jovian planet has an elongated orbit about 0.5 AU from its host star and a minimum mass 3.37 times that of Jupiter. Its orbital period of more than 133 days is much longer than that for typical hot Jupiters.

A study published in 2001 suggested that the usual inability to determine the orbital inclination of an extrasolar planet through radial velocity measurement had caused this mass to be severely underestimated. The astrometric orbit gives an orbital inclination of 11.8° and a mass of 16 Jupiter masses, which would make the object a brown dwarf. However, later analysis showed that Hipparcos was not sensitive enough to accurately determine astrometric orbits for substellar companions, which means the inclination (and hence the true mass) of the planet are still unknown.
