= Alpha Hydri =

Star in the constrellation Hydrus

- Location of α Hydri (circled)

Observation data Epoch J2000.0 Equinox ICRS
- Constellation: Hydrus
- Right ascension: 01^{h} 58^{m} 46.19467^{s}
- Declination: −61° 34′ 11.4948″
- Apparent magnitude (V): +2.90

Characteristics
- Evolutionary stage: main sequence
- Spectral type: F0 IV
- U−B color index: +0.189
- B−V color index: +0.290

Astrometry
Radial velocity (R_{v})	+7 km/s
Proper motion (μ)	RA: +263.66 mas/yr Dec.: +26.77 mas/yr
Parallax (π)	45.43±0.44 mas
Distance	71.8 ± 0.7 ly (22.0 ± 0.2 pc)
Absolute magnitude (M_{V})	+1.153

Details
Mass	2.10+0.17 −0.03 M_{☉}
Radius	3.27+0.11 −0.04 R_{☉}
Luminosity	21.00±0.75 L_{☉}
Surface gravity (log g)	3.64±0.05 cgs
Temperature	7,059+21 −56 K
Metallicity [Fe/H]	0.21+0.10 −0.08 dex
Rotational velocity (v sin i)	118 km/s
Age	810 Myr

Other designations
- α Hyi, CD−62°71, GJ 83, HIP 9236, HR 591, SAO 248474

Database references
SIMBAD	data

Alpha Hydri, Latinized from α Hydri, is the second brightest star in the southern circumpolar constellation of Hydrus. It is readily visible to the naked eye in locations south of 28°N with an apparent visual magnitude of +2.9. It is sometimes informally known as the Head of Hydrus. This should not be confused with Alpha Hydrae (Alphard) in the constellation Hydra. Alpha Hydri is one of only three stars in the constellation Hydrus that are above the fourth visual magnitude. This star can be readily located as it lies to the south and east of the prominent star Achernar in the constellation Eridanus.

Based upon parallax measurements from the Hipparcos mission, Alpha Hydri is located at a distance of about 71.8 light-years (22.0 parsecs) from Earth. This subgiant star is 3.3 times larger and 2.1 as massive as the Sun, with a stellar classification of F0 IV. It is about 810 million years old and is radiating 21 times the Sun's luminosity from its outer atmosphere at an effective temperature of 7,059 K. Alpha Hydri emits X-rays similar to Altair. The space velocity components of this star are [U, V, W] = [−14, −14, -2] km/s.

== Naming ==
In Chinese caused by adaptation of the European southern hemisphere constellations into the Chinese system, 蛇首 (Shé Shǒu), meaning Snake's Head, refers to an asterism consisting of α Hydri and β Reticuli. Consequently, α Hydri itself is known as 蛇首一 (Shé Shǒu yī, English: the First Star of Snake's Head.)
