= VW Hydri =

Star system in the constellation Hydrus

Observation data Epoch J2000.0 Equinox ICRS
- Constellation: Hydrus
- Right ascension: 04^{h} 09^{m} 11.3967^{s}
- Declination: −71° 17′ 41.555″
- Apparent magnitude (V): 8.4 to 14.4

Characteristics
- Evolutionary stage: white dwarf + main sequence
- Spectral type: DQ
- Variable type: SU UMa

Astrometry
| Proper motion (μ) | RA: +51.340 mas/yr Dec.: +12.250 mas/yr |
| Parallax (π) | 18.5743±0.0167 mas |
| Distance | 175.6 ± 0.2 ly (53.84 ± 0.05 pc) |

Orbit
| Period (P) | 0.07427130(14) days |

Details

white dwarf
| Mass | 0.71+0.18 −0.26 or 0.95±0.12 M_{☉} |
| Radius | 0.0134+0.0036 −0.0037 R_{☉} |
| Surface gravity (log g) | 8.04+0.38 −0.41 cgs |
| Temperature | 20,000–50,000 K |

companion
| Mass | 0.106±0.026 or 0.125±0.015 M_{☉} |
| Radius | 0.16–0.18 R_{☉} |

Other designations
- TYC 9156-1776-1, 2MASS J04091138-7117413

Database references
| SIMBAD | data |

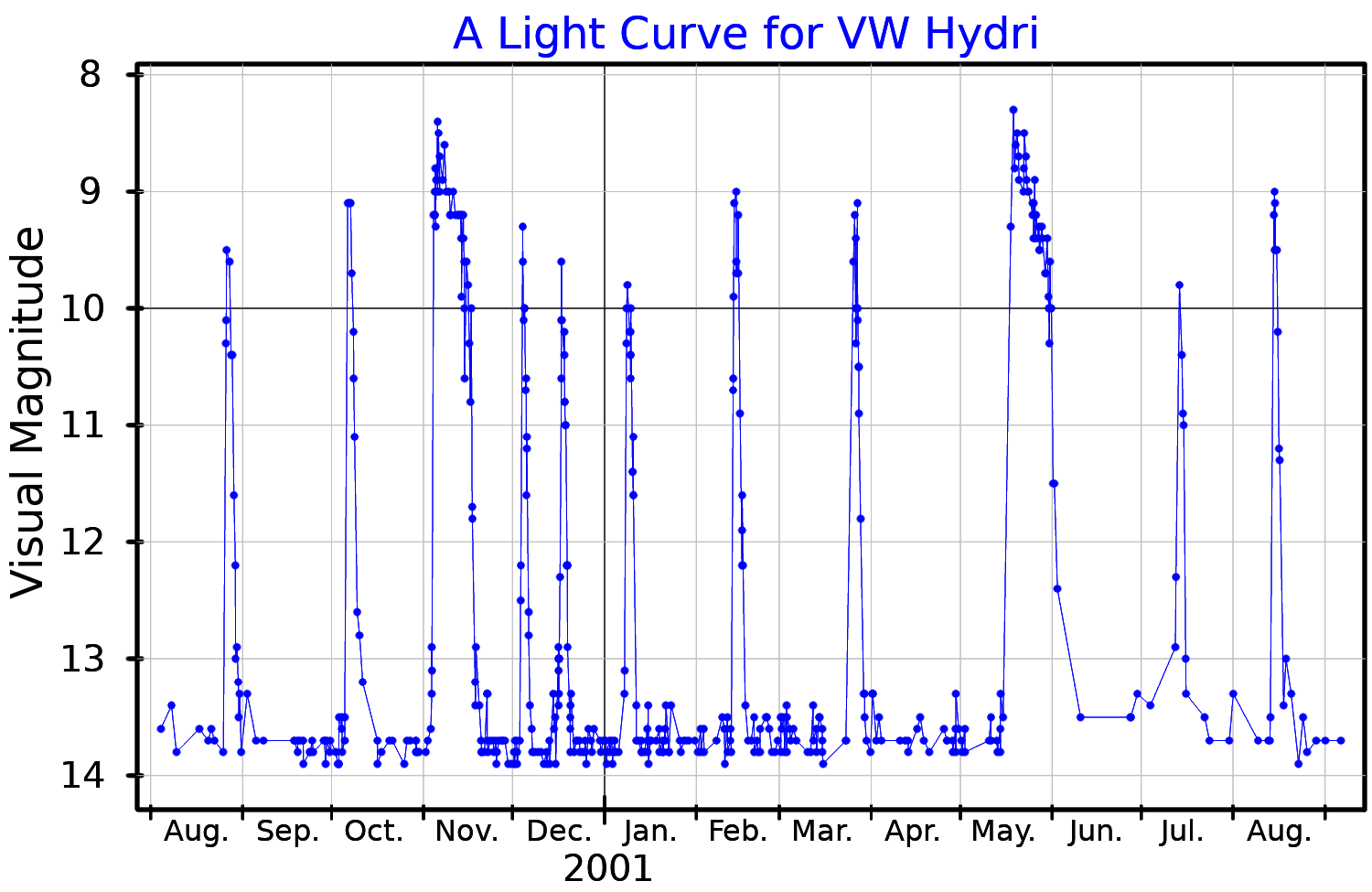
A visual band light curve for VW Hydri, plotted from AAVSO data

VW Hydri is a dwarf nova of the SU Ursae Majoris type in the deep southern constellation Hydrus; a star system that consists of a white dwarf and another generally cool star.

VW Hydri is one of the brightest dwarf novae systems in the sky. These systems are characterised by frequent eruptions and less frequent supereruptions. The former are smooth, while the latter exhibit short "superhumps" of heightened activity. The white dwarf sucks matter from the other star onto an accretion disc and periodically erupts, reaching apparent magnitude 8.4 in superoutbursts, 9.0 in normal outbursts and remaining at magnitude 14.4 when quiet. Normal outbursts occur every 27.3 days and last for 1.4 days, while superoutbursts happen 179 days and last for 12.6 days.
