= Zeta Hydri =

Star in the constellation Hydrus

ζ Hydri
- Location of ζ Hydri (circled)

Observation data Epoch J2000 Equinox ICRS
- Constellation: Hydrus
- Right ascension: 02^{h} 45^{m} 32.63435^{s}
- Declination: −67° 36′ 59.8268″
- Apparent magnitude (V): 4.83

Characteristics
- Spectral type: A2IV
- U−B color index: +0.09
- B−V color index: +0.06

Astrometry
Radial velocity (R_{v})	+3.60 km/s
Proper motion (μ)	RA: +66.41 mas/yr Dec.: +43.38 mas/yr
Parallax (π)	11.47±0.17 mas
Distance	284 ± 4 ly (87 ± 1 pc)
Absolute magnitude (M_{V})	0.13

Details
Mass	2.44 M_{☉}
Radius	3.9 R_{☉}
Luminosity	79.55 L_{☉}
Surface gravity (log g)	3.72 cgs
Temperature	9,144 K
Rotational velocity (v sin i)	116 km/s

Other designations
- ζ Hyi, CPD−68°169, FK5 2191, GC 3354, HD 17566, HIP 12876, HR 837, SAO 248644

Database references
SIMBAD	data

Zeta Hydri, Latinized from ζ Hydri, is a single, white-hued star in the southern constellation of Hydrus. It is faintly visible to the naked eye with an apparent magnitude of 4.83. This distance to this star can be estimated from its annual parallax shift of 11.47 mas, showing it to be about 284 light years away. It is moving further away from the Sun with a radial velocity of +3.6 km/s.

The spectrum of this star matches a stellar classification of A2 IV, suggesting it is a subgiant star that is in the process of evolving away from the main sequence as the supply of hydrogen at its core becomes exhausted. It has a high rate of spin, showing a projected rotational velocity of 116 km/s. This is giving the star a slight oblate shape with an equatorial bulge that is 5% larger than the polar radius. It has 2.4 times the mass of the Sun and nearly four times the Sun's radius. Zeta Hydri is radiating 80 times the Sun's luminosity into space from its photosphere at an effective temperature of 9,144 K.
