= HD 20003 =

Star in the constellation Hydrus

Observation data Epoch J2000.0 Equinox ICRS
- Constellation: Hydrus
- Right ascension: 03^{h} 07^{m} 37.91875^{s}
- Declination: −72° 19′ 18.8010″
- Apparent magnitude (V): 8.39

Characteristics
- Spectral type: G8 V
- B−V color index: 0.771±0.015

Astrometry
Radial velocity (R_{v})	−16.174±0.0005 km/s
Proper motion (μ)	RA: +71.893 mas/yr Dec.: −7.995 mas/yr
Parallax (π)	23.8764±0.0283 mas
Distance	136.6 ± 0.2 ly (41.88 ± 0.05 pc)
Absolute magnitude (M_{V})	5.18

Details
Mass	0.942±0.046 M_{☉}
Radius	0.92+0.05 −0.01 R_{☉}
Luminosity	0.705+0.002 −0.001 L_{☉}
Surface gravity (log g)	4.423±0.323 cgs
Temperature	5494±27 K
Metallicity [Fe/H]	+0.04±0.02 dex
Rotation	38.9±4 d
Rotational velocity (v sin i)	2.216±0.273 km/s
Age	5.3+2.8 −2.6 Gyr

Other designations
- CD−72°148, HD 20003, HIP 14530, SAO 255959, 2MASS J21281220-2143340

Database references
SIMBAD	data
Exoplanet Archive	data

HD 20003 is a star in the southern constellation Hydrus. With an apparent visual magnitude of 8.39, this yellow-hued star is much too faint to be visible to the naked eye. It is located at a distance of 136.6 light years from the Sun based on parallax. HD 20003 is drifting closer with a radial velocity of −16 km/s, and is predicted to come to within 97 light-years in around 1.4 million years from now.

This object is an ordinary, G-type main-sequence star with a stellar classification of G8 V. It is around five billion years old with a magnetic activity cycle lasting about ten years and a projected rotational velocity of 2.2 km/s. The star has 94% of the mass of the Sun and 92% of the Sun's radius. The metallicity of this star is similar to the Sun, if slightly higher. It is radiating 70.5% of the luminosity of the Sun from its photosphere at an effective temperature of 5,510 K.

The survey in 2015 have ruled out the existence of any stellar companions at projected distances above 18 astronomical units.

== Planetary system ==
HD 20003 has two planets that are at least 12 and 13.4 times as massive as the Earth and have orbital periods of just under 12 and 34 days, respectively. These were detected by the HARPS survey in 2011, and the findings were confirmed using Spitzer in 2017.

Since 2017, a third planet HD 20003 d on roughly half-year orbit is suspected.

The HD 20003 planetary system
Companion (in order from star)	Mass	Semimajor axis (AU)	Orbital period (days)	Eccentricity	Inclination (°)	Radius
b	≥0.0378±0.0031 M_{J}	0.0974±0.0016	11.849±0.0028	0.4±0.08	—	—
c	≥0.0422±0.004 M_{J}	0.1961±0.0032	33.823±0.0654	0.16±0.09	—	—
