= HD 1237 =

Binary star system in the constrellation Hydrus

Observation data Epoch J2000.0 Equinox ICRS
- Constellation: Hydrus
- Right ascension: 00^{h} 16^{m} 12.6791^{s}
- Declination: −79° 51′ 04.245″
- Apparent magnitude (V): 6.59

Characteristics

HD 1237 A
- Spectral type: G6 V
- B−V color index: 0.749

HD 1237 B
- Spectral type: M4 V

Astrometry
Radial velocity (R_{v})	−5.2±0.2 km/s
Proper motion (μ)	RA: 433.908±0.044 mas/yr Dec.: −56.322±0.039 mas/yr
Parallax (π)	56.9319±0.0235 mas
Distance	57.29 ± 0.02 ly (17.565 ± 0.007 pc)
Absolute magnitude (M_{V})	5.37±0.01

Details

HD 1237 A
Mass	0.99±0.02 M_{☉}
Radius	0.86±0.07 R_{☉}
Luminosity	0.64 L_{☉}
Surface gravity (log g)	4.550±0.031 cgs
Temperature	5,549±18 K
Metallicity [Fe/H]	+0.151±0.015 dex
Rotation	7.0±0.7 d
Rotational velocity (v sin i)	5.3±1.0 km/s
Age	400+1,000 −200 Myr

HD 1237 B
Mass	0.13 M_{☉}

Other designations
- 2 G. Hydri, CD−80° 9, GJ 3021, HD 1237, HIP 1292, SAO 258219, 2MASS J00161266-7951042

Database references
SIMBAD	data

HD 1237 is a binary star system approximately 57 light-years away in the constellation of Hydrus (the Water Snake).

The visible star in the system, A, is considered to be a solar analog due close mass to the sun. HD 1237 differs from the sun in that HD 1237 is much younger, has high metallicity, has much cooler temperature and is in a binary system. As of 2000, it has been confirmed that an extrasolar planet orbits the star. It is of note for being a relatively Sun-like star not very far from the Sun that is home to an extrasolar planet.

== Stellar components ==
As a nearby Sun-like star, the last decade has seen HD 1237 A being studied carefully for the first time, especially after its substellar companion was discovered. It is currently believed that it is 800 million years old, though age estimates range from 150 million to 8.8 billion years old depending on the method used for the determination. The star is more enriched with iron than the Sun, is chromospherically active, and rotates around its axis more quickly than the Sun.

The secondary star was discovered in 2006 during a deep imaging survey conducted at the European Southern Observatory using the Very Large Telescope. HD 1237 B is a M4 red dwarf star at a projected separation of 68 AU.

== Planetary system ==
Announced in 2000, the Jovian planet GJ 3021 b (GJ 3021 being an alternate less-used designation for this star) orbits about 0.5 astronomical units from HD 1237 A with a minimum mass 3.37 times that of Jupiter, as determined by measuring variations in the radial velocity of the star. A study published in 2001 suggested that the usual inability to determine the orbital inclination of an extrasolar planet through radial velocity measurement had caused this mass to be severely underestimated. The astrometric orbit gives an orbital inclination of 11.8° and a mass of 16 Jupiter masses, which would make the object a brown dwarf. However, later analysis showed that Hipparcos was not sensitive enough to accurately determine astrometric orbits for substellar companions, which means the inclination (and hence the true mass) of the planet are still unknown.

The HD 1237 planetary system
Companion (in order from star)	Mass	Semimajor axis (AU)	Orbital period (days)	Eccentricity	Inclination (°)	Radius
b	≥3.37±0.09 M_{J}	0.49	133.71±0.20	0.511±0.017	—	—

== See also ==
- Epsilon Reticuli
- HD 196885
- List of extrasolar planets
