= Delta Hydri =

Star in the constellation Hydrus

δ Hydri
- Location of δ Hydri (circled)

Observation data Epoch J2000 Equinox ICRS
- Constellation: Hydrus
- Right ascension: 02^{h} 21^{m} 44.94286^{s}
- Declination: −68° 39′ 33.9038″
- Apparent magnitude (V): 4.09

Characteristics
- Spectral type: A2 V
- U−B color index: +0.05
- B−V color index: +0.03

Astrometry
Radial velocity (R_{v})	+6.00 km/s
Proper motion (μ)	RA: -49.95 mas/yr Dec.: +2.48 mas/yr
Parallax (π)	23.35±0.34 mas
Distance	140 ± 2 ly (42.8 ± 0.6 pc)
Absolute magnitude (M_{V})	0.92

Details
Mass	2.25 M_{☉}
Radius	2.3 R_{☉}
Luminosity	39.52 L_{☉}
Surface gravity (log g)	3.98 cgs
Temperature	9,880±336 K
Metallicity [Fe/H]	+0.12 dex
Rotational velocity (v sin i)	162 km/s
Age	209 Myr

Other designations
- δ Hyi, CPD−69°113, FK5 1065, GC 2872, HD 15008, HIP 11001, HR 705, SAO 248545

Database references
SIMBAD	data

Delta Hydri, Latinized from δ Hydri, is a single, white-hued star in the southern constellation of Hydrus. It is bright enough to be faintly visible to the naked eye with an apparent visual magnitude of 4.09. The distance to this star, based upon an annual parallax shift of 23.35 mas, is about 140 light years. It is moving away from the Sun with a radial velocity of +6 km/s.

This is an ordinary A-type main-sequence star with a stellar classification of A2 V It is about 209 million years old and has a high rate of spin, showing a projected rotational velocity of 162 km/s. This is giving the star an oblate shape with an equatorial bulge that is 7% larger than the polar radius. The star has 2.25 times the mass of the Sun and 2.3 times the Sun's radius. It is radiating 39.5 times the Sun's luminosity from its photosphere at an effective temperature of around 9.880. Delta Hydri has been checked for an infrared excess, but none was found.
