= Eta2 Hydri b =

Extrasolar planet in the constrellation Hydrus

Eta^{2} Hydri b
Discovery
- Discovered by: Setiawan et al.
- Discovery site: Chile, La Silla
- Discovery date: 25 May 2005
- Detection method: Radial velocity

Orbital characteristics
- Semi-major axis: 1.93 AU (289 million km)
- Eccentricity: 0.40±0.07
- Orbital period (sidereal): 711±8 d
- Time of periastron: 2,451,420
- Argument of periastron: 351.5±9.5
- Semi-amplitude: 105±8
- Star: Eta^{2} Hydri

Physical characteristics
- Mass: >6.54 M_{J}

Eta^{2} Hydri b (η^{2} Hyi b, η^{2} Hydri b), commonly known as HD 11977 b, is an extrasolar planet that is approximately 217 light-years away in the constellation of Hydrus. The presence of the planet around an intermediately massive giant star provides indirect evidence for the existence of planetary systems around A-type stars.
