= Eta1 Hydri =

Star in the constellation Hydrus

Eta^{1} Hydri
Observation data Epoch J2000.0 Equinox J2000.0 (ICRS)
- Constellation: Hydrus
- Right ascension: 01^{h} 52^{m} 34.78591^{s}
- Declination: −67° 56′ 40.1823″
- Apparent magnitude (V): 6.76

Characteristics
- Evolutionary stage: main sequence
- Spectral type: B9 V
- B−V color index: −0.050±0.002

Astrometry
Radial velocity (R_{v})	+15.0±3.0 km/s
Proper motion (μ)	RA: +18.270 mas/yr Dec.: −8.948 mas/yr
Parallax (π)	5.2719±0.0548 mas
Distance	619 ± 6 ly (190 ± 2 pc)
Absolute magnitude (M_{V})	+0.77

Details
Mass	2.7 M_{☉}
Radius	2.8 R_{☉}
Luminosity	83 L_{☉}
Surface gravity (log g)	3.98 cgs
Temperature	10,445 K
Age	311 Myr

Other designations
- η^{1} Hyi, AAVSO 0152-68, CD−68°87, HD 11733, HIP 8751, SAO 248455

Database references
SIMBAD	data

Eta^{1} Hydri, Latinized from η^{1} Hydri, is a blue-white hued star in the southern constellation of Hydrus. It has an apparent visual magnitude of 6.76, which may be too faint to be visible to the naked eye. Based upon an annual parallax shift of 5.27 mas as measured from Earth, the system is located about 619 light years distant from the Sun. At that distance, the visual magnitude of the star is diminished by 0.10 magnitudes of extinction due to interstellar dust. The star is drifting further away with a heliocentric radial velocity of +15 km/s.

This is a B-type main-sequence star with a stellar classification of B9 V that was suspected in 1939 by Herbert Schneller of being variable. However, this may have been based on a photographic plate that was later rejected. It is listed in the General Catalogue of Variable Stars, but marked as probably constant.

The star is about 311 million years old and is radiating 83 times the luminosity of the Sun from its photosphere at an effective temperature of 10,445 K.
