= Gamma Hydri =

Variable star in the constrellation Hydrus

- Location of γ Hydri (circled in red)

Observation data Epoch J2000.0 Equinox J2000.0 (ICRS)
- Constellation: Hydrus
- Right ascension: 03^{h} 47^{m} 14.34062^{s}
- Declination: −74° 14′ 20.2686″
- Apparent magnitude (V): 3.26

Characteristics
- Evolutionary stage: AGB
- Spectral type: M1 III
- U−B color index: +1.98
- B−V color index: +1.62

Astrometry
Radial velocity (R_{v})	+15.8±0.6 km/s
Proper motion (μ)	RA: +50.85 mas/yr Dec.: +114.74 mas/yr
Parallax (π)	15.24±0.11 mas
Distance	214 ± 2 ly (65.6 ± 0.5 pc)
Absolute magnitude (M_{V})	−0.83

Details
Mass	1.0 M_{☉}
Radius	62±1 R_{☉}
Luminosity	513 L_{☉}
Surface gravity (log g)	0.84 cgs
Temperature	3499 K
Metallicity [Fe/H]	0.0 dex

Other designations
- γ Hyi, CPD−74°276, HD 24512, HIP 17678, HR 1208, SAO 256029

Database references
SIMBAD	data

γ Hydri, Latinised as Gamma Hydri, is a solitary, red-hued star in the constellation Hydrus. It has an apparent visual magnitude of 3.26, making it easily visible to the naked eye at night. Based upon an annual parallax shift of 15.24 mas as measured from Earth, the system is located about 214 light-years from the Sun.

This is an evolved red giant star with a stellar classification of M1 III, and is most likely on the asymptotic giant branch of the HR diagram. It is a semiregular variable that pulsates between magnitudes 3.26 and 3.33, although its period is not known precisely. It has about the same mass as the Sun, but has expanded to around 62 times the Sun's radius. The star is radiating 513 times the Sun's luminosity from its enlarged photosphere at an effective temperature of 3,499 K.
