= Eta2 Hydri =

Evolved G-type star in the constellation Hydrus

Eta^{2} Hydri
- Location of η^{2} Hydri (circled in red)

Observation data Epoch J2000.0 Equinox J2000.0
- Constellation: Hydrus
- Right ascension: 01^{h} 54^{m} 56.131^{s}
- Declination: −67° 38′ 50.29″
- Apparent magnitude (V): +4.68

Characteristics
- Evolutionary stage: Red clump
- Spectral type: G8IIIb
- B−V color index: 0.931±0.036
- Variable type: Constant

Astrometry
Radial velocity (R_{v})	−17.75±0.15 km/s
Proper motion (μ)	RA: +75.927 mas/yr Dec.: +73.401 mas/yr
Parallax (π)	14.7444±0.0878 mas
Distance	221 ± 1 ly (67.8 ± 0.4 pc)
Absolute magnitude (M_{V})	0.57±0.07

Details
Mass	2.08±0.04 M_{☉}
Radius	11.17±0.07 R_{☉}
Luminosity	65.92±0.86 L_{☉}
Surface gravity (log g)	2.71±0.27 cgs
Temperature	4,932±20 K
Metallicity [Fe/H]	−0.24±0.05 dex
Rotational velocity (v sin i)	2.4±1.0 km/s
Age	0.87±0.05 Gyr

Other designations
- η^{2} Hyi, CPD−68 101, HD 11977, HIP 8928, HR 570, SAO 248460

Database references
SIMBAD	data
Exoplanet Archive	data

Eta^{2} Hydri is a star in the southern constellation of Hydrus. The name is Latinized from η^{2} Hydri and often catalogued as HD 11977. It is visible to the naked eye with an apparent visual magnitude of +4.68, and is one of the least variable stars known. The distance to Eta^{2} Hydri is approximately 221 light-years based on parallax measurements, but it is drifting closer to the Sun with a radial velocity of −18 km/s.

The stellar classification of Eta^{2} Hydri is G8IIIb, which indicates this is a evolved giant star. It is located in the clump zone of the HR diagram, which means it has already ascended the red giant branch and is now generating energy by core helium fusion surrounded by a hydrogen fusing shell. Based on its mass, it was probably a class A star (similar to Vega or Fomalhaut) when it was on the main sequence. It is estimated to be around 870 million years old and has expanded to 11 times the Sun's diameter, though is only around two times as massive as the Sun. The star has a leisurely rotation, with a period of no more than 230–270 days. As of 2005, an extrasolar planet was confirmed to be orbiting the star.

== Planetary system ==
In 2005, the giant planet Eta^{2} Hydri b was found in orbit around Eta^{2} Hydri by measuring radial velocity variations. This object has at least 6.3 times the mass of Jupiter and is orbiting with a period of 1.95 years. It is the first giant planet to be found in orbit around an intermediate-mass giant star.

The Eta^{2} Hydri planetary system
Companion (in order from star)	Mass	Semimajor axis (AU)	Orbital period (days)	Eccentricity	Inclination (°)	Radius
b	>6.29±0.07 M_{J}	1.89±0.11	711±8	0.40±0.07	—	—

== See also ==
- HD 11964
