= NGC 5988 =

Galaxy in the constellation Serpens

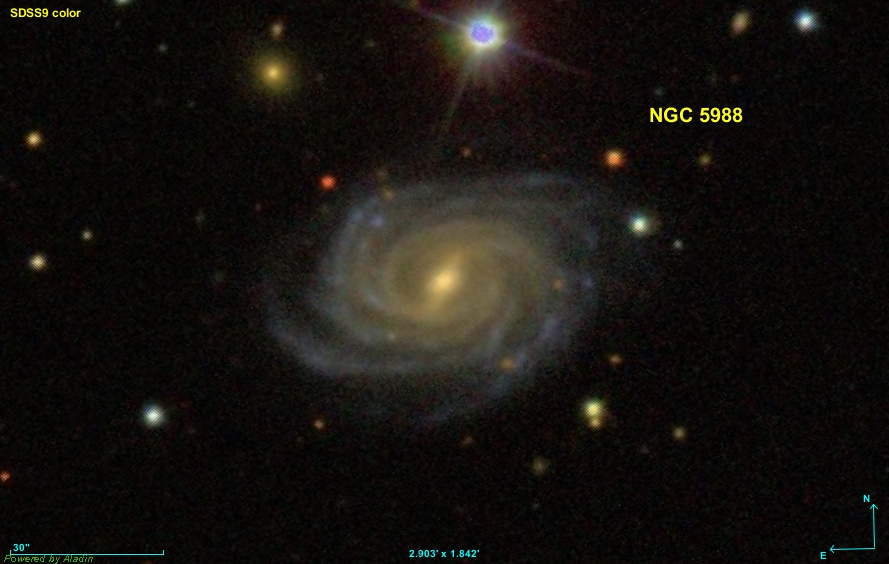
- NGC 5988 imaged by SDSS

Observation data (J2000 epoch)
- Constellation: Serpens
- Right ascension: 15^{h} 44^{m} 33.8559^{s}
- Declination: +10° 17′ 35.33″
- Redshift: 0.035259
- Heliocentric radial velocity: 10,570 ± 4 km/s
- Distance: 514.6 ± 36.0 Mly (157.78 ± 11.05 Mpc)
- Apparent magnitude (V): 13.8

Characteristics
- Type: Scd
- Size: ~298,900 ly (91.63 kpc) (estimated)
- Apparent size (V): 1.2′ × 1.0′

Other designations
- IRAS F15421+1026, 2MASX J15443383+1017356, UGC 9998, MCG +02-40-012, PGC 55921, CGCG 078-058

NGC 5988 is a large spiral galaxy in the constellation of Serpens. Its velocity with respect to the cosmic microwave background is 10697 ± 10 km/s, which corresponds to a Hubble distance of 514.6 ± 36.0 Mly (157.78 ± 11.05 Mpc). However, one non-redshift measurement gives a much larger distance of 668.62 Mly (205.000 Mpc). It was discovered by American astronomer Lewis Swift on 17 April 1887.

NGC 5988 is a LINER galaxy, i.e. it has a type of nucleus that is defined by its spectral line emission which has weakly ionized or neutral atoms, while the spectral line emission from strongly ionized atoms is relatively weak.

One supernova has been observed in NGC 5988: SN 2023hbv (Type II, mag. 19.278) was discovered by ATLAS on 29 April 2023.

== See also ==
- List of NGC objects (5001–6000)
