= L183 =

Pre-stellar core in the constellation Serpens

Molecular cloud
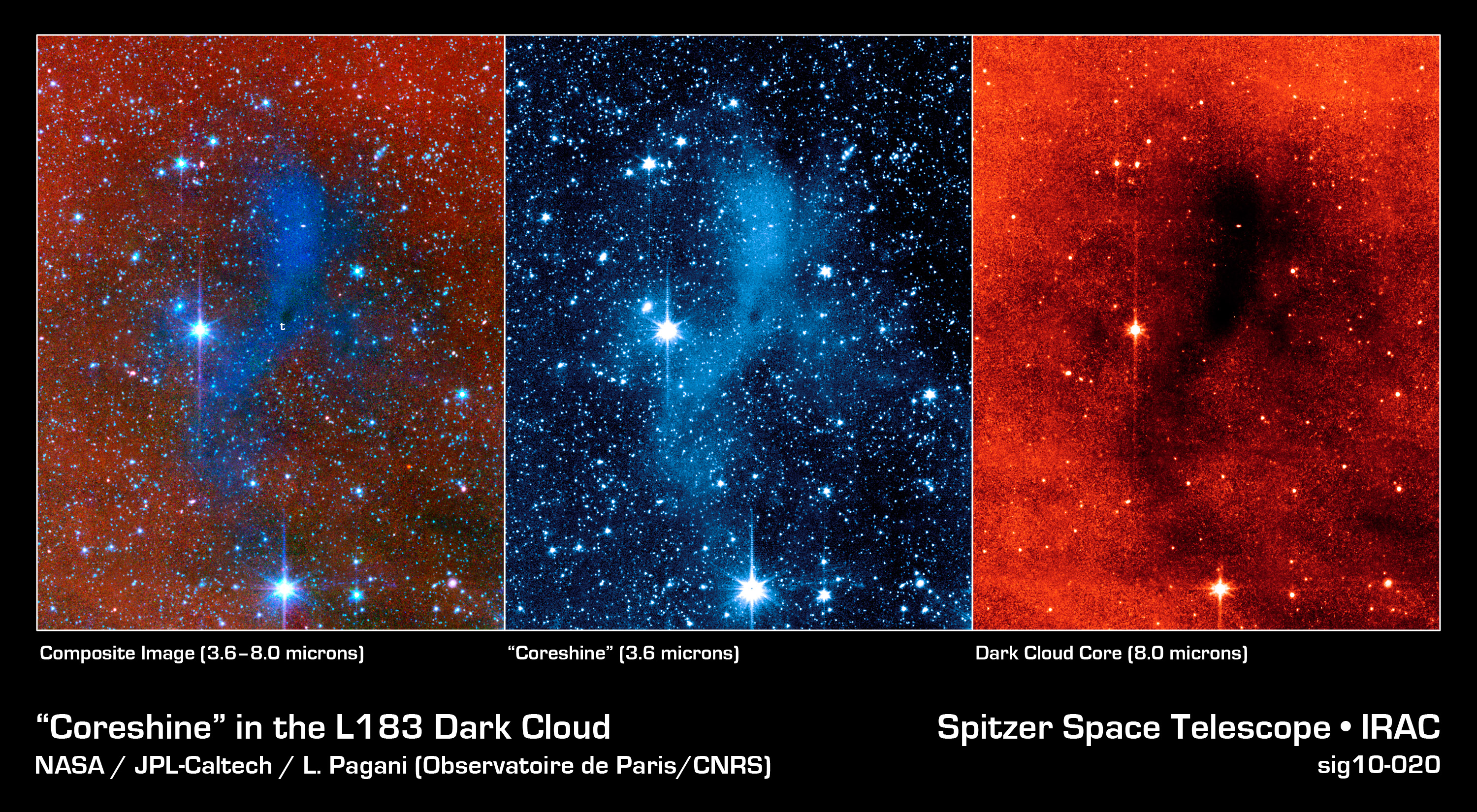
- L183 in different infrared wavelengths as imaged by the Spitzer Space Telescope

Observation data: J2000 epoch
- Right ascension: 15^{h} 54^{m} 12.2^{s}
- Declination: −02° 49′ 42″
- Distance: 360 ly
- Apparent diameter: 75′
- Constellation: Serpens
- Designations: LDN 134N

L183 or L134N is a pre-stellar core in the constellation Serpens Cauda 360 light-years away. This massive accumulation of gas and dust was the interstellar object in which the phenomenon of coreshine was first investigated by astronomers and produced a new means of probing its previously opaque core.
