= Sh 2-54 =

Nebula in the constellation Serpens

Emission nebula
- H II region
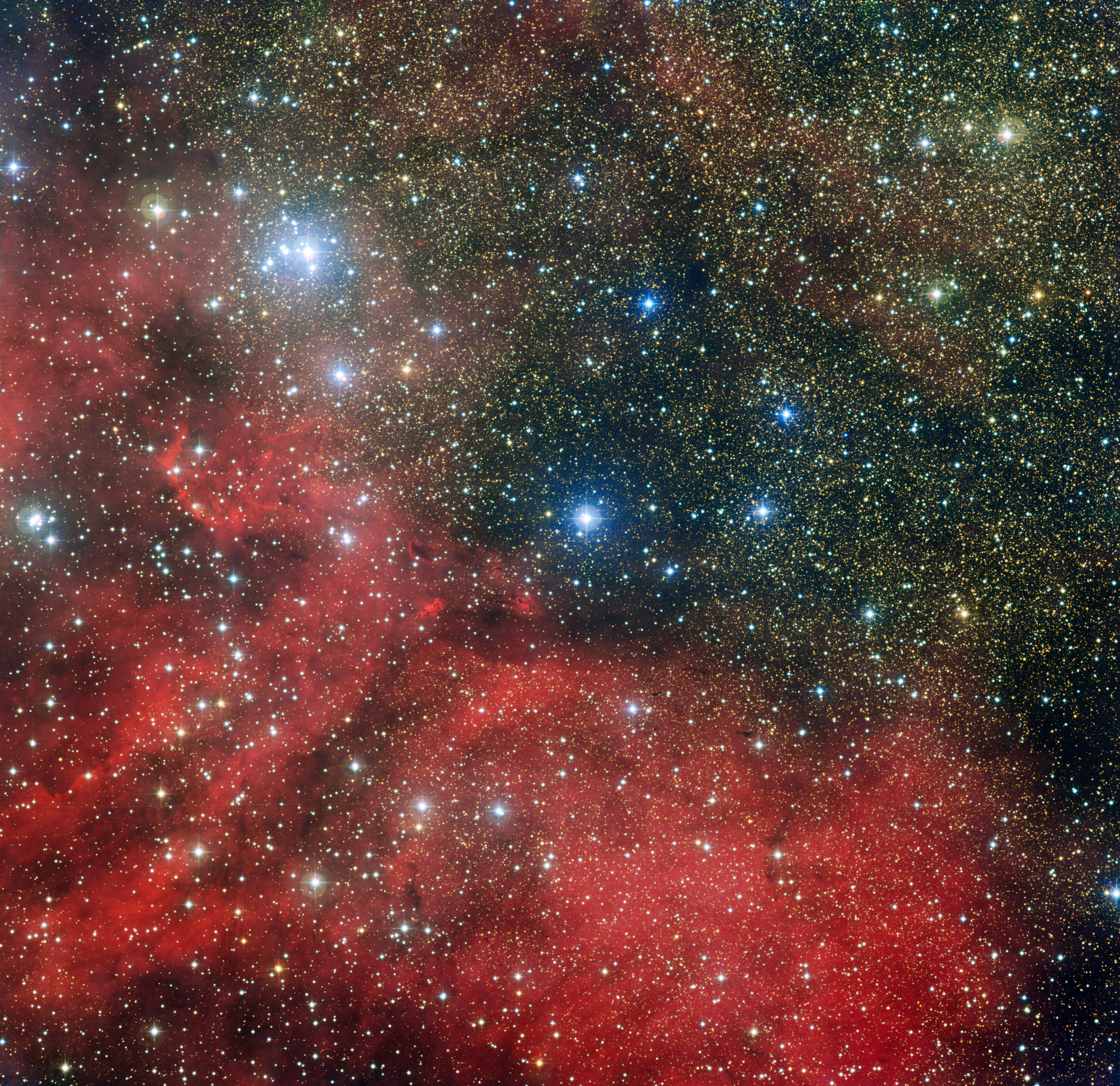
- Sh 2-54 nebula surrounding the star cluster NGC 6604

Observation data: J2000 epoch
- Right ascension: 18^{h} 17^{m} 53^{s}
- Declination: −11° 40′ 58″
- Distance: 6,200 ly
- Apparent dimensions (V): 140 arcmins
- Constellation: Serpens

Physical characteristics
- Radius: 126.25 ly
- Designations: RCW 167, Gum 84/85, W35, LBN 72

Sh 2-54 is an extended bright nebula in the constellation of Serpens.

In its core there are many protostars and many infrared sources; some of these sources, like IRAS 18151−1208, are most probably very young high-mass stars. The older star population in this region has an average age of 4–5 million years, and its components are grouped in the open cluster NGC 6604.

Sh 2-54 belongs to an extended nebulosity that includes also the Eagle Nebula and the Omega Nebula. The young high-mass stars of this region constitute the Serpens OB1 and Serpens OB2 OB association.

== Gallery ==
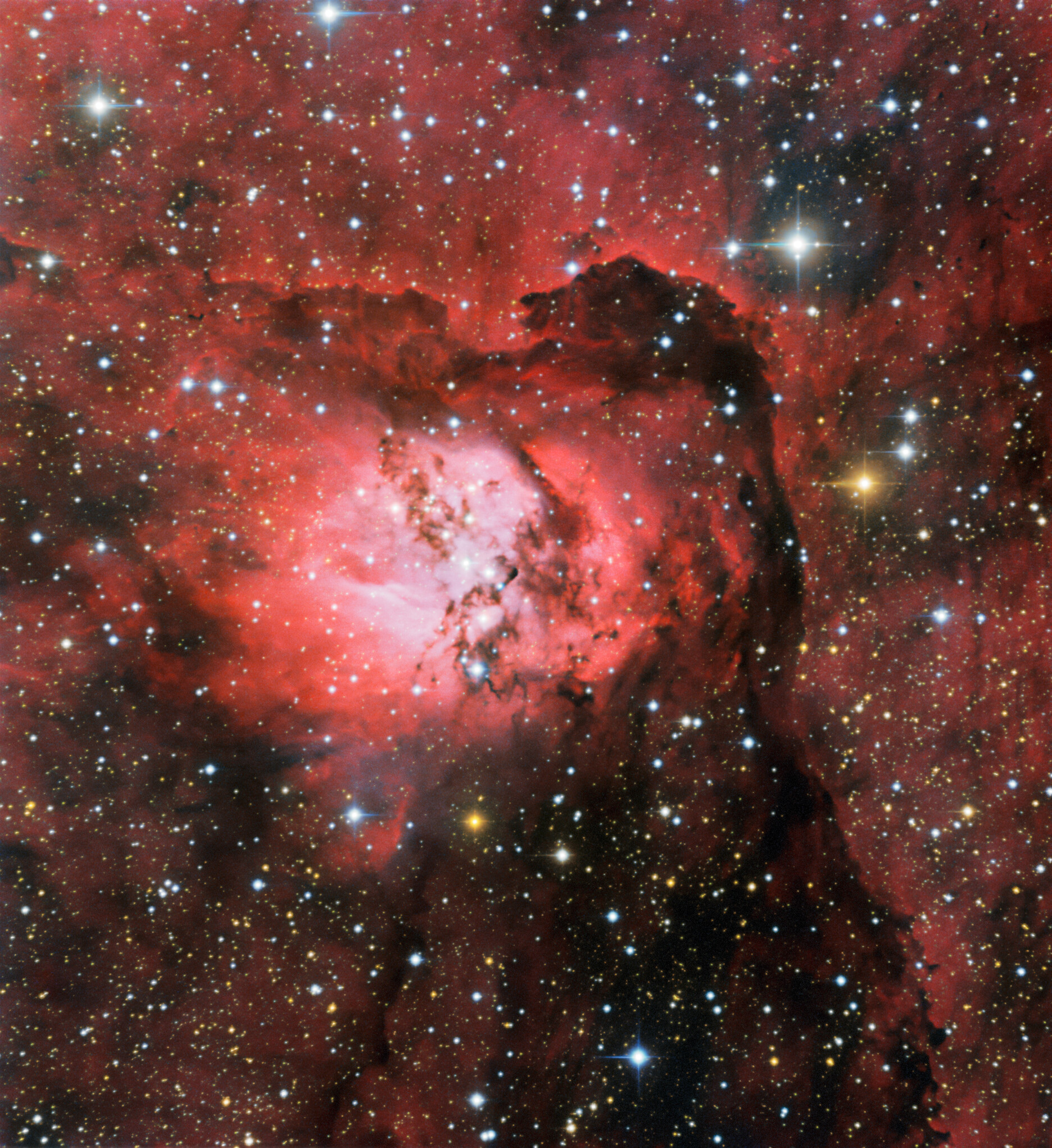
Serpent's Nebula

== See also ==
- H II region
