= SDSS J1536+0441 =

Quasar in the constellation Serpens

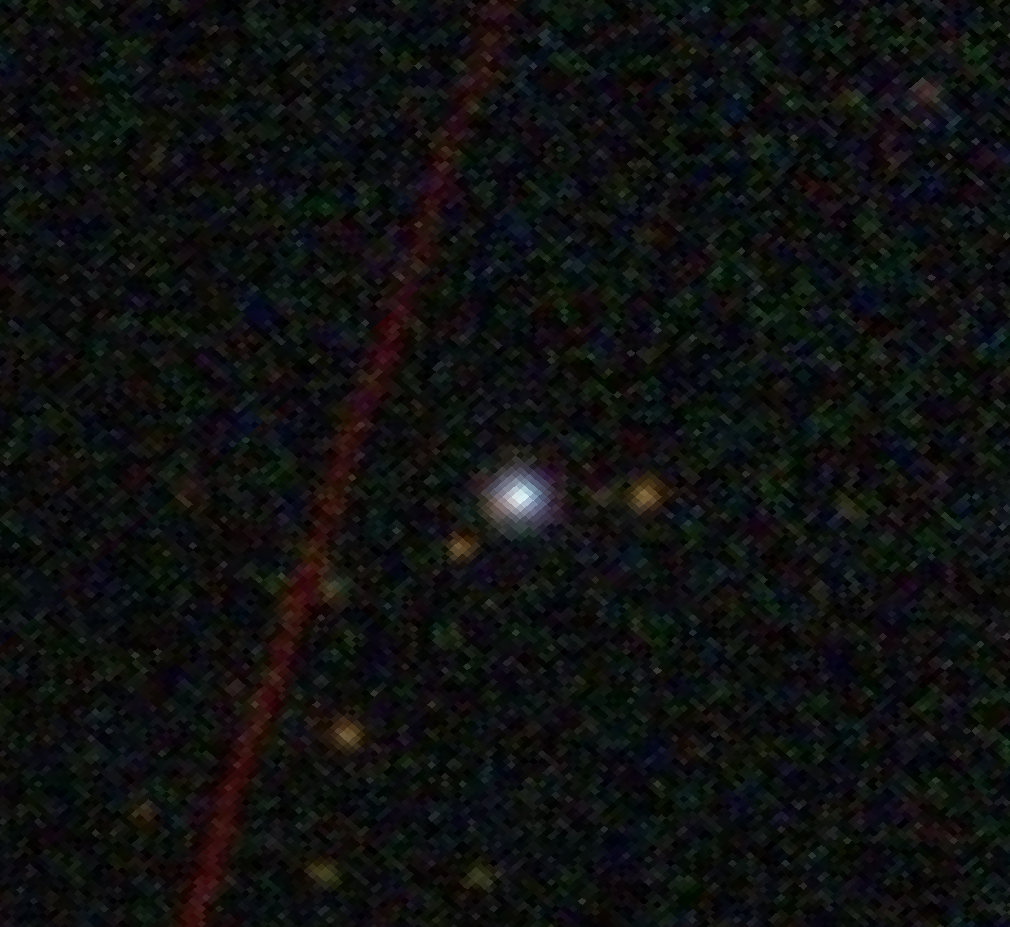
- The quasar SDSS J1536+0441.

Observation data (J2000.0 epoch)
- Constellation: Serpens
- Right ascension: 15^{h} 36^{m} 36.22^{s}
- Declination: +04° 41′ 27.01″
- Redshift: 0.388938
- Heliocentric radial velocity: 116,601 ± 13 km/s
- Distance: 5,611.2 ± 392.8 Mly (1,720.39 ± 120.43 Mpc)

Characteristics
- Type: Candidate BH binary
- Size: ~215,000 ly (65.9 kpc) (estimated)

Other designations
- KODIAQ J153636+044127, SDSS J153636.22+044127.0, LQAC 234+004 002

SDSS J1536+0441 known as SDSS J153636.22+044127.0, is a quasar located in the constellation of Serpens. The redshift of the object is (z) 0.388 and it was first discovered by astronomers in March 2009. They classified it as a binary black hole candidate with two emission line components separated with a velocity of 3,500 kilometers per seconds, although classification as a quasar pair seems more accurate.

== Description ==
SDSS J1536+0441 is classified as radio-quiet. It contains two supermassive black holes, having a separation gap of 0.1 parsecs. The black holes are estimated to have masses of 10^{7.3} and 10^{8.9} M_{☉} and have an orbital period of around 100 years. The optical spectrum of the quasar contains a single set of narrow absorption lines and two broad emission lines. Studies also showed it is a double-peaked emitter object, with the central broad component described as redshifted by about 400 kilometers per seconds, suggesting outflows. A blue wing component has been observed, weak in hydrogen-beta profile and strong in hydrogen-alpha profile.

High resolution imaging made in September 2009 showed the quasar is located inside a moderately rich galaxy cluster. The host of the quasar is only just resolved. It is asymmetrically elongated and has extended radio emission. There is a bright close companion located 5 kiloparsecs away from the quasar. Imaging by the Hubble Space Telescope revealed the companion is a smooth elliptical galaxy without any tidal interactions.

Radio imaging made with the Very Large Array (VLA) at 8.5 GHz frequencies found there are two unresolved sources that have a measured diameter of only around 1.9 kiloparsecs, with the companion and the quasar in correspondence with the sources, suggesting they each contain an active galactic nucleus. Imaging made by European Very Long Baseline Interferometry (VLBI) telescopes, would later confirm the theory based on presence of two compact radio cores that are positioned in the objects. The cores have a flat or an inverted radio spectrum with estimated flux densities of 0.72 mJy and 0.24 mJy at 5 GHz frequencies.
