= NGC 5940 =

Spiral galaxy in the constellation Serpens

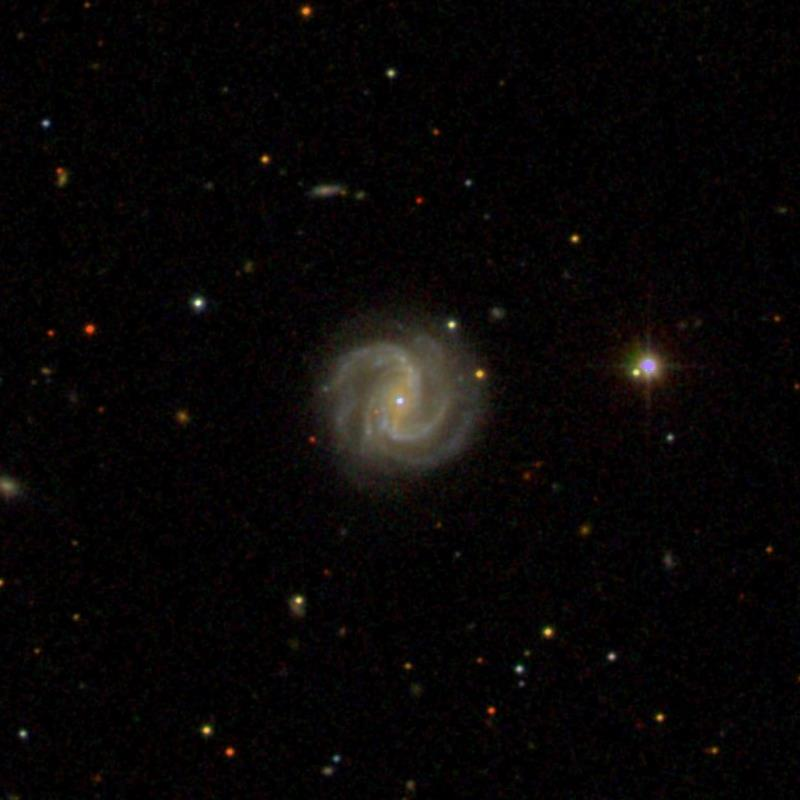

Observation data (J2000 epoch)
- Constellation: Serpens
- Right ascension: 15h 31m 18.070s
- Declination: +07d 27m 27.91s
- Redshift: 0.03405
- Heliocentric radial velocity: 10,209 km/s
- Distance: 500 Mly (153.3 Mpc)
- Apparent magnitude (V): 15.56

Characteristics
- Type: Seyfert galaxy
- Size: 140,000 ly

Other designations
- PGC 55295, IRAS F15288+0737, UGC 9876, LEDA 55295, MRK 1511, MRK 9030, MCG +01-39-025

NGC 5940 is a barred spiral galaxy located in the constellation Serpens. The galaxy was found on April 19, 1887, by Lewis Swift, an American astronomer. NGC 5940 is located 500 million light-years away from the Milky Way and it is approximately 140,000 light-years across in diameter.

NGC 5940 is a Seyfert type 1 galaxy and is considered a quasar according to the SIMBAD database. It is registered under the Markarian Catalogue as Markarian 1511 or MRK 9030. It has an bright active core, meaning there is a presence of an acceleration disc around its huge black hole. This in turn, emits strong radiation and ultraviolet rays that later get ejected into the depths of space.
