= W Serpentis =

Variable star in the constellation Serpens

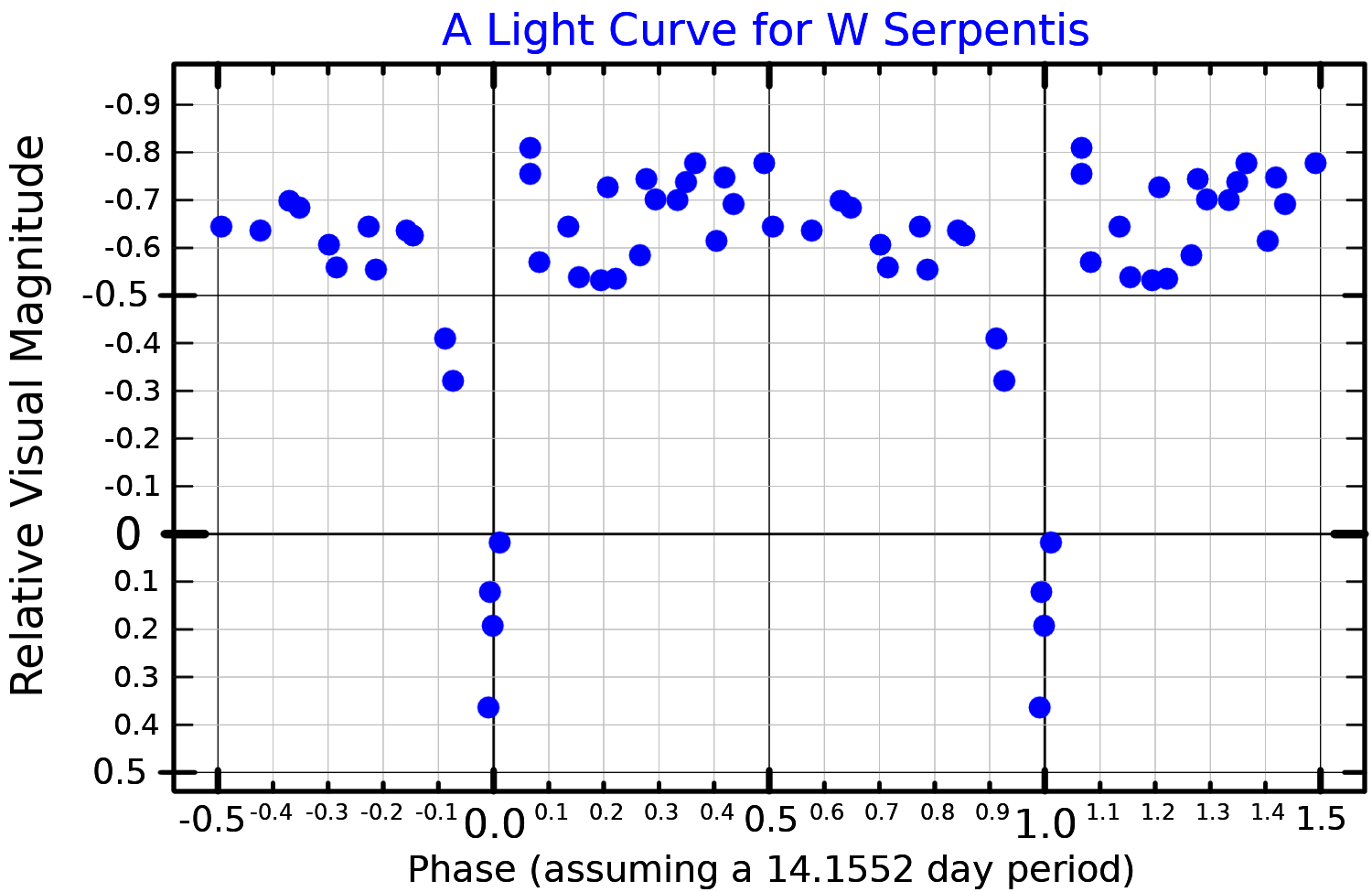
- A visual band light curve for W Serpentis, adapted from Piirola et al. (2005)

Observation data Epoch J2000.0 Equinox ICRS
- Constellation: Serpens
- Right ascension: 18^{h} 09^{m} 50.64856^{s}
- Declination: −15° 33′ 00.2634″
- Apparent magnitude (V): 8.42-10.2

Characteristics
- Spectral type: F8/G2Iaep + AV
- Variable type: W Ser

Astrometry
Proper motion (μ)	RA: 0.590 mas/yr Dec.: 3.058 mas/yr
Parallax (π)	1.1340±0.0237 mas
Distance	2,880 ± 60 ly (880 ± 20 pc)

Orbit
Period (P)	14.1787 days
Semi-major axis (a)	48.7 R_{☉}
Eccentricity (e)	0
Inclination (i)	72.5°

Details

cool
Mass	2.0 M_{☉}
Radius	14.3 R_{☉}
Temperature	5000 K

hot
Mass	5.7 M_{☉}
Radius	3.8 R_{☉}
Temperature	17900 K

Other designations
- BD−15°4842, HD 166126, HIP 88994, SAO 161128

Database references
SIMBAD	data

W Serpentis is an eclipsing binary star in the constellation Serpens. It is always too faint to be seen with the naked eye, varying between apparent magnitudes 8.42 and 10.2 with a period of just over 14 days. Annie Jump Cannon's discovery that the star is a variable star was published in 1907. Its variable brightness is mainly due to eclipses; however, variations in its period indicate there are some innate changes in luminosity of one or both component stars as they interact with each other, and it has been difficult to disentangle the light to determine their nature. The period is increasing by 14 seconds a year, indicating that a massive amount of material is being transferred from the larger fainter star to the smaller brighter one.

The system has been found to contain an accretion disk, and was one of the first discovered W Serpentids, which are eclipsing binaries containing exceptionally strong far-ultraviolet spectral lines. These systems have a high rate of mass transfer between one star and the other, and are thought to evolve first into double periodic variables and then classical Algol variables. In the late stages of mass transfer, such systems can develop an optically thick disc and are segregated as a separate class of W Serpentis stars. The classes may also represent different types of system altogether, with the W Serpentis type being younger and more massive.

The spectral types of the component stars are not known; the hotter brighter component appears spectrally similar to an F-type giant. However, the central star appears to be completely obscured by material and may be a B-type main sequence star. The spectrum of the cooler fainter star has not been identified. Examining the polarised light shows that a jet of material is probably coming from the primary star as well. The properties of the two components are highly uncertain. Their orbital separation has been calculated to be as low as 17.2 R_{☉} or as high as 48.7 R_{☉}. The orbit is generally assumed to be circular, although the 9th catalogue of spectroscopic binary orbits gives an eccentric orbit from a very old source. The accretion disc has been calculated at 14.9 R_{☉} across. The sizes of the two stars are disputed: different sources give masses of 5.7 M_{☉} and 2.0 M_{☉} or 1.5 M_{☉} and 1.0 M_{☉} for the hot and cool components respectively, and radii of 3.8 R_{☉} and 14.3 R_{☉} or 1.3 R_{☉} and 1.0 R_{☉} for the hot and cool components respectively.
