= Red Square Nebula =

Nebula in the constellation Serpens

Reflection nebula
- Protoplanetary nebula
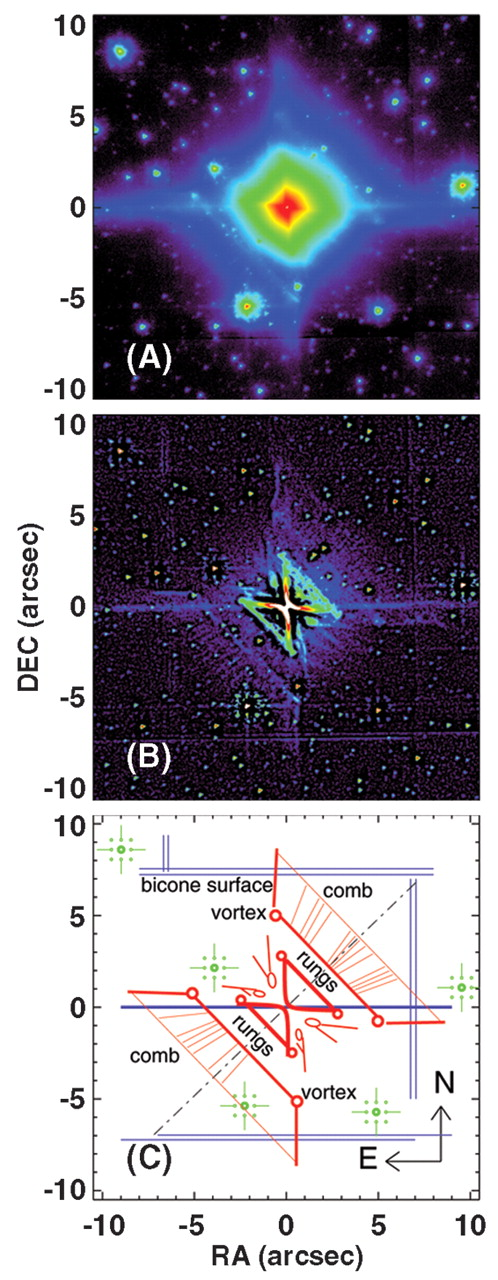

Observation data: J2000 epoch
- Subtype: bipolar nebula
- Right ascension: 18^{h} 21^{m} 16.060^{s}
- Declination: −13° 01′ 25.69″
- Distance: 5000 ly (1500 pc)
- Constellation: Serpens

Physical characteristics
- Radius: 0.206 ly
- Designations: MWC 922

The Red Square Nebula is a celestial object located in the area of the sky occupied by star MWC 922 in the constellation Serpens. The first images of this bipolar nebula, taken using the Palomar Observatory Hale Telescope in California, were released in April 2007. It is notable for its square shape, which according to Sydney University astrophysicist Peter Tuthill, makes it one of the most nearly discrete-symmetrical celestial objects ever imaged.

The explanation proposed by Tuthill and his collaborator James Lloyd of Cornell University is that the square shape arises from two cone shapes placed tip-to-tip, as seen from the side. This also explains the "double-ring" structure seen in SN 1987A.

A series of faint spokes radiate from the center of the structure. One possible explanation is that these spokes are shadows cast by periodic ripples or waves on the surface of an inner disk close to the central star.

There is no clear explanation of how the central star could produce the nebula's shape:

Towards the end of their lives, many low-mass stars, like the Sun, slough off their outer layers to produce striking 'planetary' nebulae. But the hot star at the heart of the Red Square nebula, called MWC 922, appears to be relatively massive, suggesting another process formed its signature shape. "How did all this beautiful, crisp structure form?" asks Peter Tuthill of the University of Sydney in Australia. "This is the million dollar question."
