= NGC 5920 =

Lenticular galaxy located in constellation Serpens

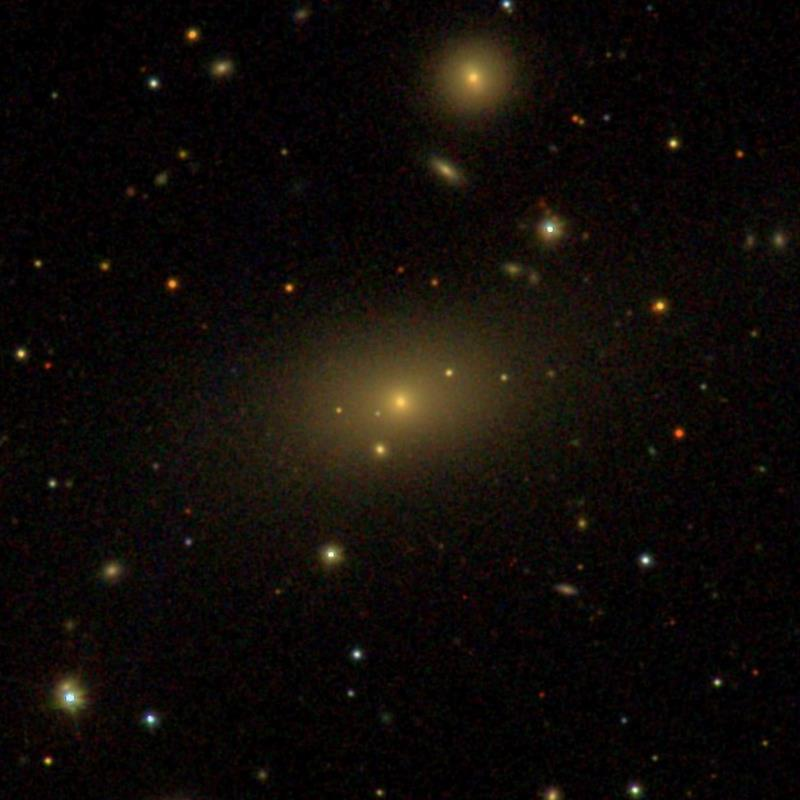

Observation data (J2000 epoch)
- Constellation: Serpens
- Right ascension: 15^{h} 21^{m} 51.85^{s}
- Declination: +07° 42′ 31.75″
- Redshift: 0.044196
- Heliocentric radial velocity: 13,250 km/s
- Distance: 645.9 ± 45.1 Mly (198.02 ± 13.82 Mpc)
- Group or cluster: MKW 3
- Apparent magnitude (V): 13.7

Characteristics
- Type: Radio galaxy, BCG
- Size: ~299,000 ly (91.8 kpc) (estimated)

Other designations
- PGC 54839, UGC 9822, 4C 07.41, Z 49-145, FIRST J152151.85+074231, PKS 1519+07, 3C 318.1

NGC 5920 is a large lenticular galaxy located in the constellation Serpens. Discovered on March 30, 1887, by American astronomer Lewis Swift, NGC 5920 is around 645 million light-years distant from planet Earth. It is a narrow-line radio galaxy and about 300,000 light-years in diameter.

== Characteristics ==
NGC 5920 has an active galactic nucleus. It presents a radio jet. In addition, it hosts a radio source in its core called 3C 318.1, indicating emissions of strong radio waves. NGC 5920 was studied by Chandra-MUSE, in which X-ray and optical filament analysis in clusters were carried out. The main purpose for this was to find the excitation process responsible for increased filament emission. The research was further improved by following the cold gas phase and through study of intensive ratios in emission lines that caused the excitation. Researchers found that, there was a spatial connection between the filaments that are cold and having lower metal abundance levels.

== Group Membership ==
NGC 5920 is the brightest cluster galaxy of a small galaxy cluster which is known as MKW 3. Apart from it, another radio galaxy NGC 5919, is also located there.
