= NGC 5921 =

Galaxy in the constellation Serpens

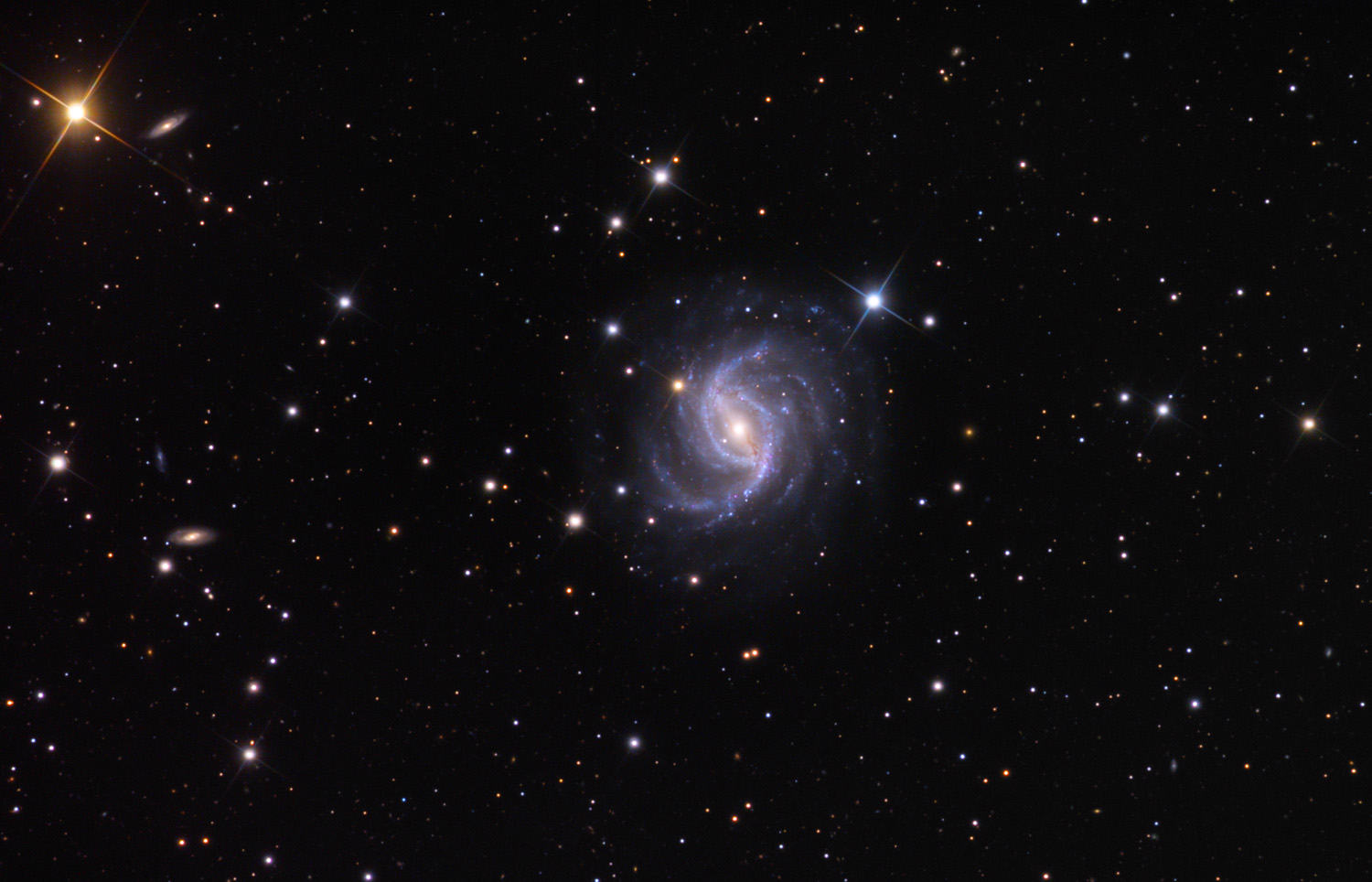
- NGC 5921 as taken at the Mount Lemmon SkyCenter

Observation data (J2000 epoch)
- Constellation: Serpens Caput
- Right ascension: 15^{h} 21^{m} 56.5^{s}
- Declination: +05° 04′ 14″
- Redshift: 0.00470 ± 0.00001
- Heliocentric radial velocity: 1480 ± 1 km/s
- Distance: 65 Mly
- Apparent magnitude (V): 11.5

Characteristics
- Type: SB(r)bc
- Size: 87,300 ly (26.78 kpc) (diameter; D_{25} isophote)
- Apparent size (V): 4.9′ × 4.0′

Other designations
- UGC 9824, PGC 54849

NGC 5921 is a barred spiral galaxy located approximately 65 million light-years from the Solar System in the constellation Serpens Caput. It was discovered by William Herschel on 1 May 1786. In February 2001 a type II supernova (SN 2001X) was discovered in NGC 5921. It is a member of the Virgo III Groups, a series of galaxies and galaxy clusters strung out to the east of the Virgo Supercluster of galaxies.

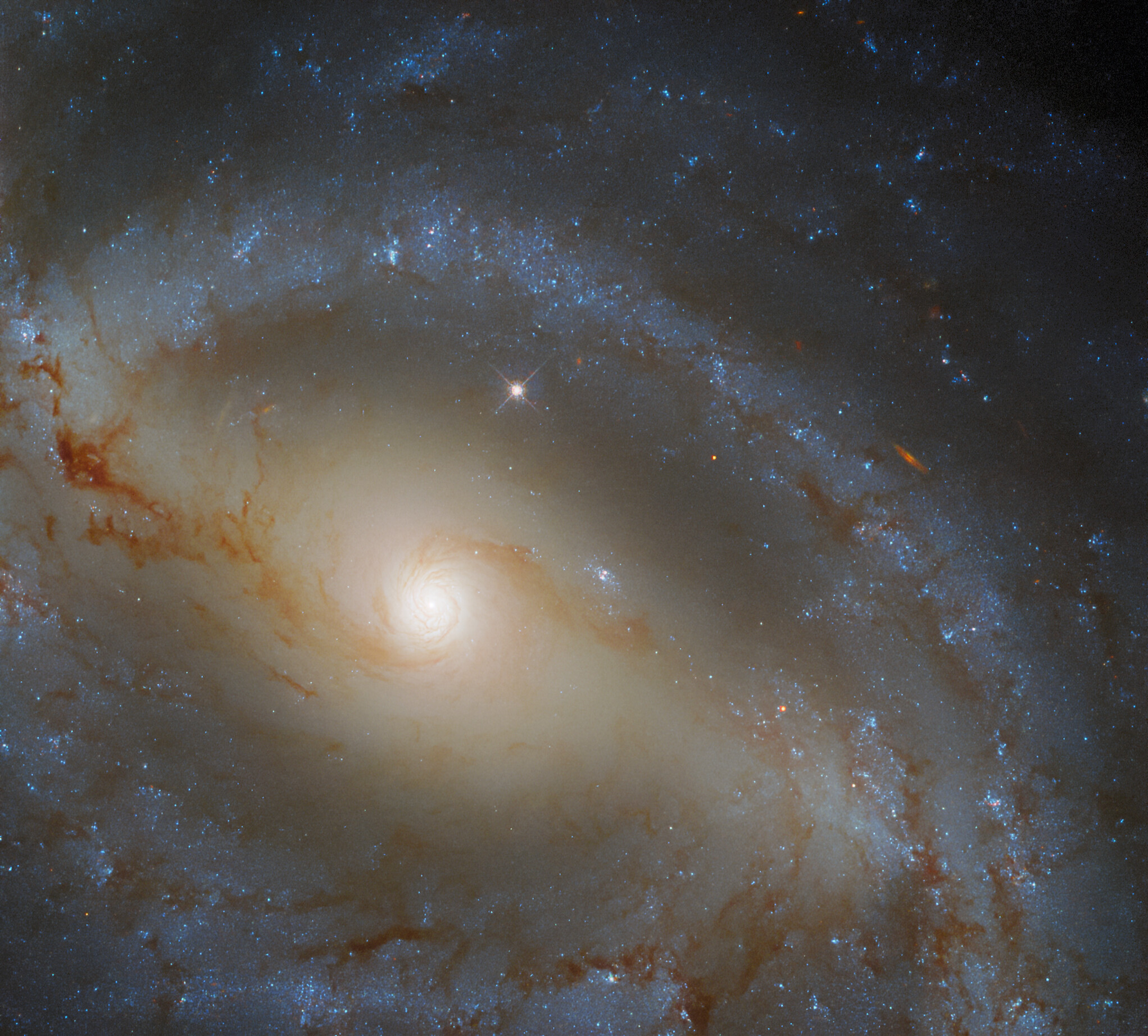
Hubble Space Telescope image of NGC 5921's center

== See also ==
- Spiral Galaxy NGC 1300
- List of NGC objects (5001–6000)
