= R Serpentis =

Variable star in the constellation Serpens

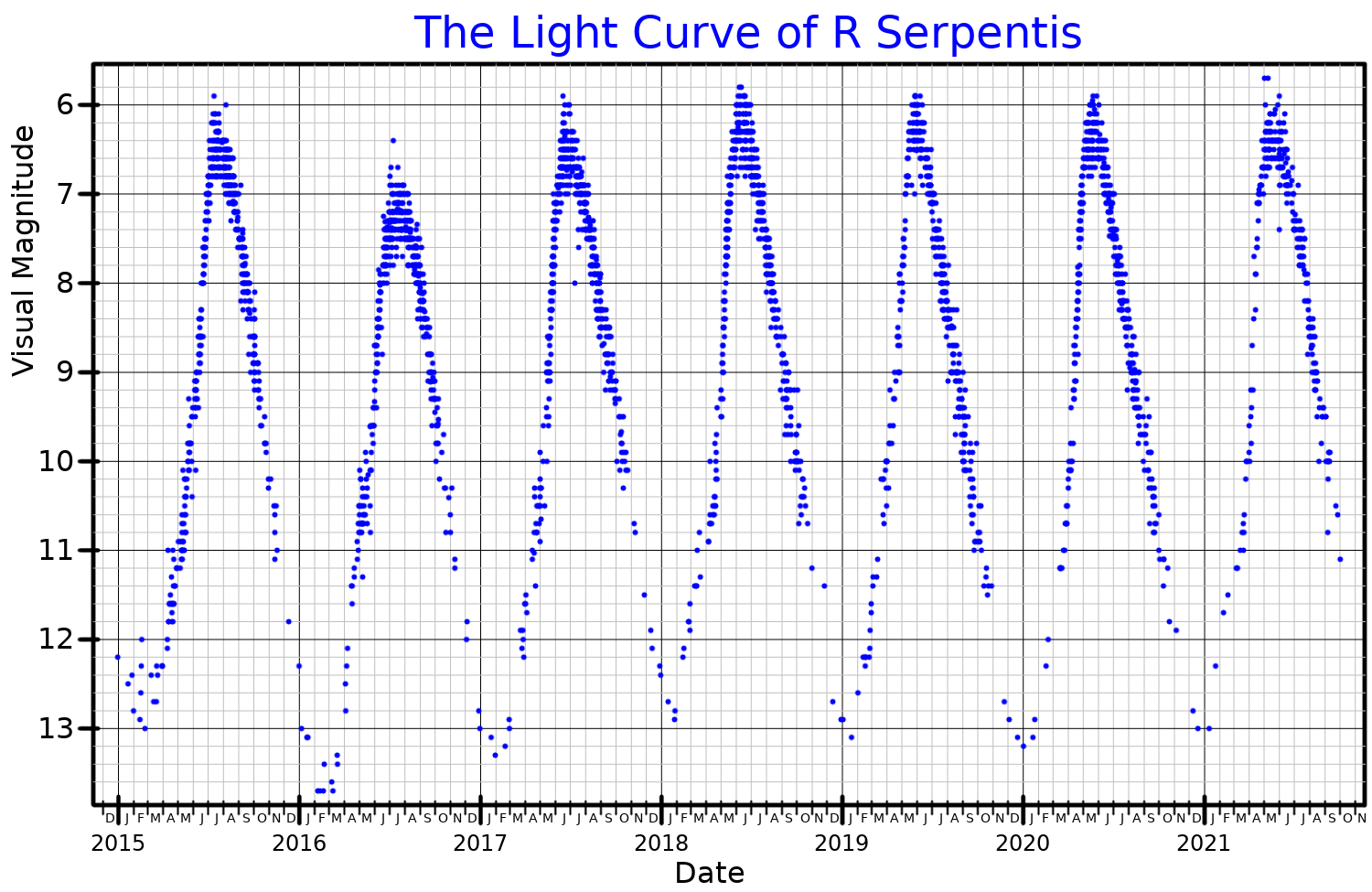
- The visual band light curve of R Serpentis, from AAVSO data

Observation data Epoch J2000 Equinox ICRS
- Constellation: Serpens
- Right ascension: 15^{h} 50^{m} 41.73245^{s}
- Declination: +15° 08′ 01.0810″
- Apparent magnitude (V): 5.2 - 14.4

Characteristics
- Evolutionary stage: AGB
- Spectral type: M5-8e
- B−V color index: 1.500±0.510
- Variable type: Mira

Astrometry
Radial velocity (R_{v})	23.8±0.8 km/s
Proper motion (μ)	RA: +2.387 mas/yr Dec.: −36.699 mas/yr
Parallax (π)	3.5110±0.2966 mas
Distance	930 ± 80 ly (280 ± 20 pc)

Details
Mass	3.6 M_{☉}
Radius	79 R_{☉}
Luminosity	758 L_{☉}
Surface gravity (log g)	1.55 cgs
Temperature	3,413 K

Other designations
- R Ser, BD+15°2918, HD 141850, HIP 77615, HR 5894, SAO 101771

Database references
SIMBAD	data

R Serpentis is a Mira variable type star in the equatorial constellation of Serpens. It ranges between apparent magnitude 5.16 and 14.4, and spectral types M5e to M8e, over a period of 356.41 days. When it is near maximum brightness, it can be seen with the naked eye under excellent observing conditions. The variability of this star was discovered in 1826 by Karl Ludwig Harding.
