= 3C 321 =

Galaxy in the constellation Serpens

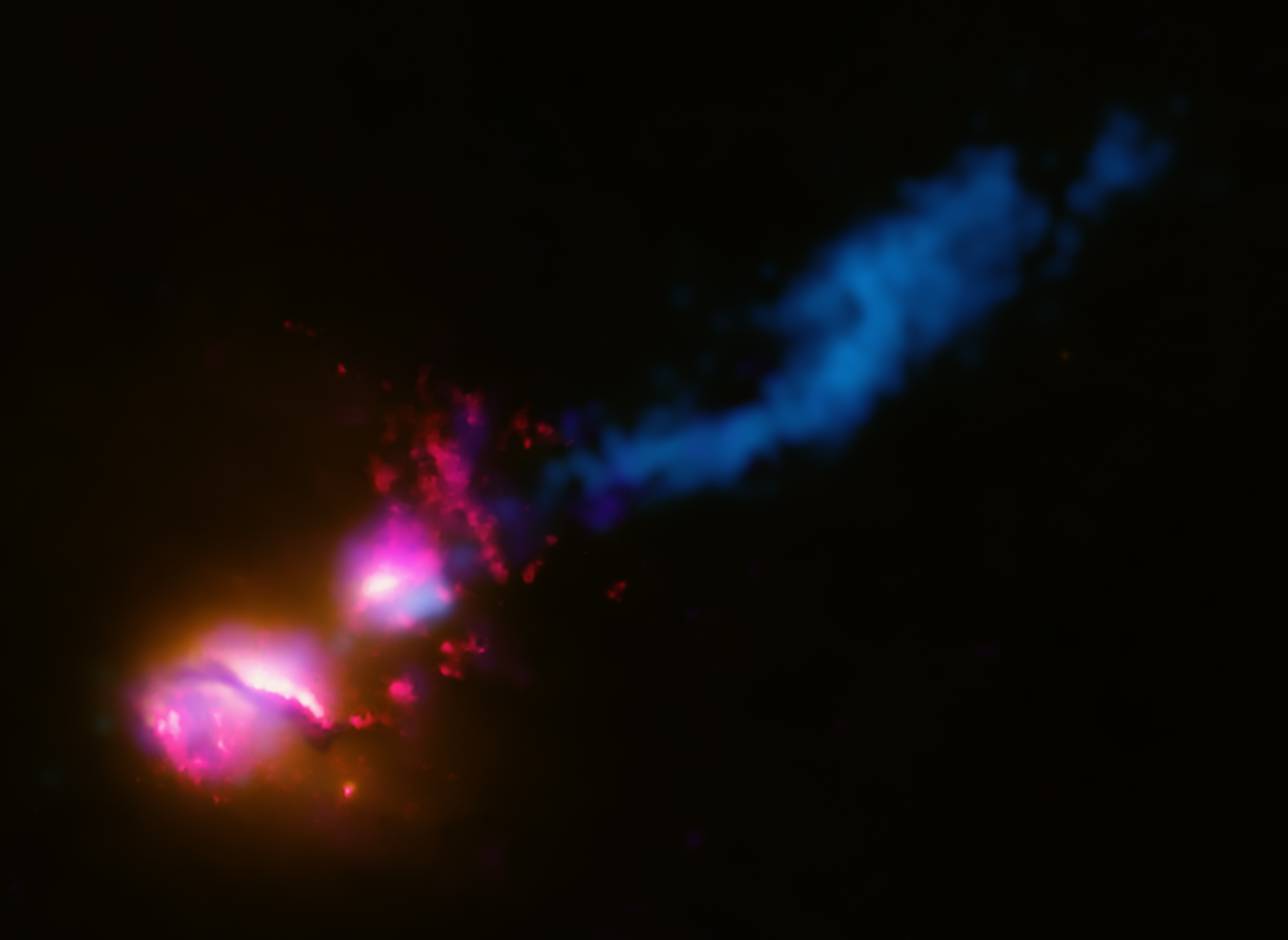
- Galaxy system 3C 321. A stream of energy is erupting from the "Death Star Galaxy" at bottom-left, striking its companion galaxy at top-right.

Observation data (J2000 epoch)
- Constellation: Serpens
- Right ascension: 15^{h} 31^{m} 43.48^{s}
- Declination: +24° 04′ 19.3″
- Redshift: 0.096190
- Heliocentric radial velocity: 27456 km/s
- Distance: 1.2 billion ly (370 Mpc) (Light travel time)
- Apparent magnitude (V): 16.00
- Apparent magnitude (B): 16.32

Characteristics
- Type: Sa

Other designations
- PGC 55317

3C 321 is a system of two galaxies rotating around each other. They are notable for showing the first observed galaxy smiting another galaxy with a blast of energy, which is theorized to be from a supermassive black hole at the center of the former galaxy.

The larger galaxy, dubbed the "Death Star Galaxy" by NASA astronomers, has an energetic jet directed towards its companion. The discovery was announced by NASA on 18 December 2007. Observation of the enormous jet was possible due to the combined efforts of both space and ground-based telescopes.

Tools included NASA's Chandra X-ray Observatory, Hubble Space Telescope, Spitzer Space Telescope, the Very Large Array, and the Multi-Element Radio Linked Interferometer Network.
