= NRAO 530 =

Flat spectrum radio quasar in the constellation Serpens

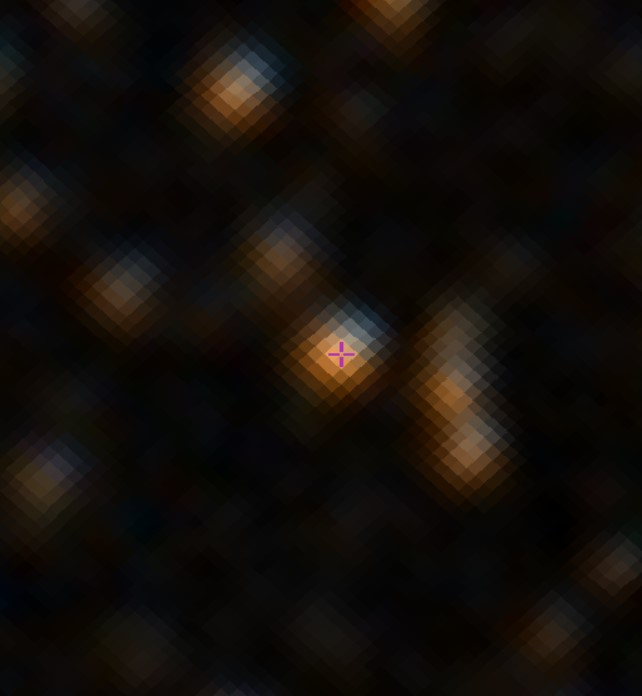
- The flat spectrum radio quasar NRAO 530.

Observation data (J2000.0 epoch)
- Constellation: Serpens
- Right ascension: 17^{h} 33^{m} 02.705^{s}
- Declination: −13° 04′ 49.548″
- Redshift: 0.899000
- Heliocentric radial velocity: 269,513 km/s
- Distance: 7.558 Gly
- Apparent magnitude (V): 19.5
- Apparent magnitude (B): 18.0

Characteristics
- Type: blazar;FRSQ;LPQBLLAC

Other designations
- LEDA 2829294, PKS 1730-130, 4FGL J1733.0-1305, G4Jy 1417, Cul 1730-130, PKS 1730-13, PKS B1730-130

NRAO 530 or PKS 1730-13 is a flat-spectrum radio quasar located in the southern constellation of Serpens. It has a redshift of 0.902. and was first discovered by two astronomers, W.J. Welch and Hyron Spinrad in 1973. It is classified as a blazar because of its optical variability across the electromagnetic spectrum in radio, gamma ray and X-ray bands. This quasar is also further categorized an OVV quasar.

== Description ==
Like many other blazars, NRAO 530 is shown to be in a flaring state. In 1994, it showed a striking flare that was observed in radio and millimeter wavelengths in its 30-year history with two of its distinctive flares nearly tripling the 90 GHz flux. A short X-ray flare was detected in February 2004 by INTEGRAL, with the source being detected in the 20-40 keV energy range at the level of ≈2 × 10^{−10} erg cm^{−2} s^{−1}. In 2010, there was increased gamma-ray flux from the blazar leading to a high amplitude outburst.

NRAO 530 contains a core-jet structure showing detections of superluminal motions in 5 of the jet components with projected velocities between the range of 13.6 and 25.2c. Additionally, the structure's compact component (the radio core) is found to be the strongest with polarized emission around it. There is an extended radio structure present containing slight emission knots being aligned in a confined curved western jet, terminating at a hot spot location. When situated close to the core, the jet abruptly bends, revealing an evolution of a position angle from north at projected VLBI scale distance of ~400 parsecs. This is then increased towards west at a larger VLBI scale of ~10 kiloparsecs. In the eastern side, a faint and broad counter-jet is seen ending at another bright hot spot creating a diffused lobe.

NRAO 530 has two-sided radio lobes, which the western lobe is found stronger compared to the eastern lobe and is linked to the core. Furthermore, the western lobe is located 11 arcsecs west by a position angle of -86°. An expanding halo was detected between 1994 and 1995 with an apparent projected velocity of 26 h^{−1} c.

The supermassive black hole mass in NRAO 530 is uncertain with some studies estimating it between the ranges of 3 × 10^{8} M_{☉} and 2 × 10^{9} M_{☉}.
