= Mu Serpentis =

Star in the constellation Serpens

μ Serpentis
- Location of μ Serpentis (circled)

Observation data Epoch J2000.0 Equinox J2000.0 (ICRS)
- Constellation: Serpens
- Right ascension: 15^{h} 49^{m} 37.20696^{s}
- Declination: −03° 25′ 48.7358″
- Apparent magnitude (V): 3.543

Characteristics
- Evolutionary stage: main sequence
- Spectral type: A0 V
- U−B color index: −0.025
- B−V color index: −0.032

Astrometry
Radial velocity (R_{v})	−9.4±2.7 km/s
Proper motion (μ)	RA: −100.28 mas/yr Dec.: +25.99 mas/yr
Parallax (π)	19.23±0.38 mas
Distance	170 ± 3 ly (52 ± 1 pc)
Absolute magnitude (M_{V})	−0.04

Orbit
Period (P)	36±2 yr
Semi-major axis (a)	0.110±0.010″
Eccentricity (e)	0.4±0.3
Inclination (i)	103±28°
Longitude of the node (Ω)	296±28°
Periastron epoch (T)	1988.9±1.8
Argument of periastron (ω) (secondary)	308±32°

Details

μ Ser A
Mass	2.4 ± 0.4 M_{☉}
Luminosity	92 L_{☉}
Temperature	9,487 K
Rotational velocity (v sin i)	96 km/s

μ Ser B
Mass	2.3 ± 0.4 M_{☉}

Other designations
- μ Ser, 32 Serpentis, BD−02°4052, FK5 585, HD 141513, HIP 77516, HR 5881, SAO 140787

Database references
SIMBAD	data

Mu Serpentis, Latinized from μ Serpentis, is a binary star in the Serpens Caput (head) section of the equatorial constellation Serpens. It is visible to the naked eye with an apparent visual magnitude of 3.543. Based upon an annual parallax shift of 19.23 mas as seen from Earth, it is located around 170 light years from the Sun.

This is an astrometric binary for which coarse orbital elements have been determined based on interferometric observations. The pair orbit each other with a period of around 36 years and an eccentricity of roughly 0.4. The primary member, component A, is a white-hued A-type main sequence star with a stellar classification of A0 V. The nature of the secondary, component B, is less certain – it may be a class A or F type star of unknown luminosity class.

In Chinese astronomy, Mu Serpentis is called 天乳, Pinyin: Tiānrǔ, meaning Celestial Milk, because this star is marking itself and stand alone in Celestial Milk asterism, Root mansion (see : Chinese constellation).
