= Kappa Serpentis =

Red giant star in the constellation Serpens

- Location of κ Serpentis (circled in red)

Observation data Epoch J2000 Equinox ICRS
- Constellation: Serpens
- Right ascension: 15^{h} 48^{m} 44.37720^{s}
- Declination: +18° 08′ 29.6337″
- Apparent magnitude (V): 4.09

Characteristics
- Evolutionary stage: red giant branch
- Spectral type: M0.5III
- U−B color index: +1.95
- B−V color index: +1.62

Astrometry
Radial velocity (R_{v})	−38.48 km/s
Proper motion (μ)	RA: −52.407 mas/yr Dec.: −88.419 mas/yr
Parallax (π)	8.5231±0.1657 mas
Distance	383 ± 7 ly (117 ± 2 pc)
Absolute magnitude (M_{V})	−1.25

Details
Mass	2.7 M_{☉}
Radius	71.31+1.42 −1.48 R_{☉}
Luminosity	1,021±57 L_{☉}
Surface gravity (log g)	1.96 cgs
Temperature	3,863±39 K
Metallicity [Fe/H]	−0.30 dex

Other designations
- Gudja, κ Ser, 35 Ser, NSV 7269, BD+18 3074, FK5 584, HD 141477, HIP 77450, HR 5879, SAO 101752

Database references
SIMBAD	data

Kappa Serpentis, Latinised from κ Serpentis, is a single, red-hued star in the constellation Serpens, in its head (Serpens Caput). It has the proper name Gudja /ˈɡuːdʒə/ and the Flamsteed designation 35 Serpentis. This star is visible to the naked eye with an apparent visual magnitude of +4.09. It is located approximately 383 light years from the Sun, based on parallax, and is drifting closer with a radial velocity of −38 km/s.

This object is an aging red giant star with a stellar classification of M0.5III. After exhausting the supply of hydrogen at its core, the star cooled and expanded off the main sequence, and now has around 71 times the Sun's radius. It is radiating nearly 1,000 times the luminosity of the Sun from its photosphere at an effective temperature of 3,863 K. This is a suspected variable star. Although simple grading based on its colour and luminosity mark this star as possibly being on the asymptotic giant branch, a closer study places it as being towards the most luminous part of the red giant branch, before starting core helium fusion.

== Nomenclature ==
κ Serpentis (Latinised to Kappa Serpentis) is the star's Bayer designation.

The star bore the traditional name Gudja (or Judja) in the culture of the Wardaman people of the Northern Territory of Australia, meaning 'water goanna'. In 2016, the IAU organized a Working Group on Star Names (WGSN) to catalog and standardize proper names for stars. The WGSN approved the name Gudja for this star on 10 August 2018 and it is now so included in the List of IAU-approved Star Names.
