= NGC 6535 =

Globular cluster in the constellation Serpens

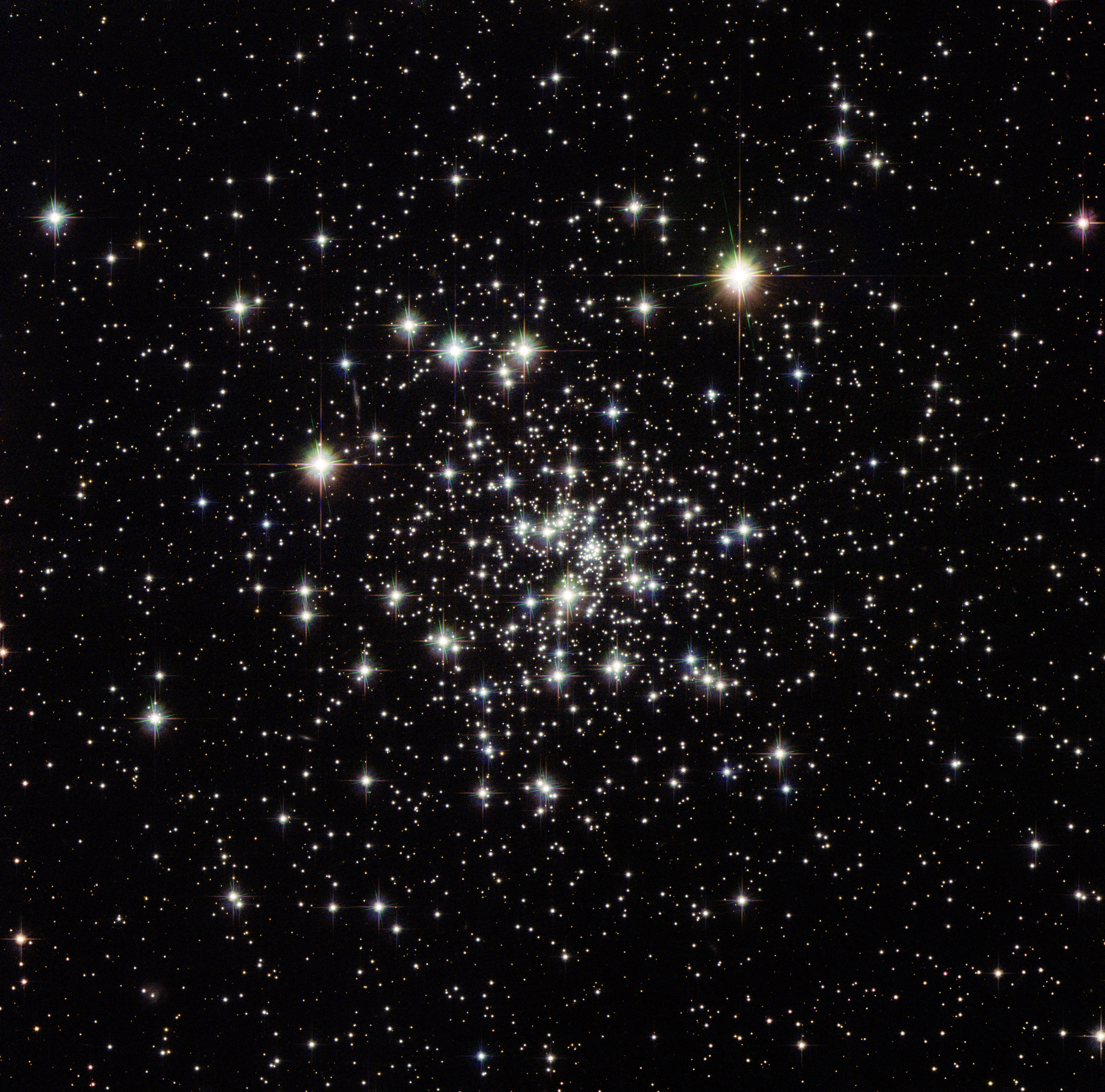

Observation data (J2000 epoch)
- Class: XI
- Constellation: Serpens
- Right ascension: 18^{h} 03^{m} 50.51^{s}
- Declination: −00° 17′ 51.5″
- Distance: 22 kly (6.8 kpc)
- Apparent magnitude (V): 9.85

Physical characteristics
- Mass: (2.21±0.78)×10^{4} M_{☉}
- Metallicity: [Fe/H] = −1.95±0.04 dex
- Estimated age: 12.75 Gyr
- Other designations: NGC 6535, C 1801-003, Glc 83

NGC 6535 is a globular cluster of stars located at a distance of 22,200 light years from Earth in the equatorial constellation of Serpens, and is listed in the New General Catalogue. Its discovery is usually attributed to astronomer John Russell Hind in 1852. However, Wolfgang Steinicke has uncovered evidence that William Herschel's first discovery was actually NGC 6535, which he observed on 24 August 1780.

This is a halo globular cluster located close to the galactic bulge at a distance of 13 kly (3.9 kpc) from the Galactic Center. It has an estimated age of 12.75 billion years. For an object of its type, NGC 6535 has a relatively low mass of 2.2×10^{4} times the mass of the Sun. The core radius is 2.3 ly (0.71 pc) and the tidal radius is 50 ly (15.3 pc). It has an unusually high mass-to-light ratio of 11.

The cluster is suspected to harbour an intermediate-mass black hole in its center. Unusually for a low-mass globular cluster, it has multiple generations of stars. Rather small and sparse for a globular cluster, this cluster contains no known RR Lyrae variables, which is unusual for a globular cluster. Nine blue stragglers have been discovered.
