= Omicron Serpentis =

Star in the constellation Serpens

- Location of ο Serpentis (circled in red)

Observation data Epoch J2000.0 Equinox J2000.0 (ICRS)
- Constellation: Serpens
- Right ascension: 17^{h} 41^{m} 24.87286^{s}
- Declination: −12° 52′ 31.1086″
- Apparent magnitude (V): 4.26

Characteristics
- Spectral type: A2 Va
- U−B color index: +0.08
- B−V color index: +0.07
- Variable type: δ Sct

Astrometry
Radial velocity (R_{v})	−30.2±1.2 km/s
Proper motion (μ)	RA: −72.90 mas/yr Dec.: −55.55 mas/yr
Parallax (π)	18.83±0.25 mas
Distance	173 ± 2 ly (53.1 ± 0.7 pc)
Absolute magnitude (M_{V})	+0.760

Details
Mass	2.13 M_{☉}
Radius	2.2 R_{☉}
Luminosity	42.6 L_{☉}
Surface gravity (log g)	3.82±0.14 cgs
Temperature	8,972±305 K
Rotational velocity (v sin i)	112.6±1.2 km/s
Age	518 Myr

Other designations
- ο Ser, 56 Ser, BD−12°4808, FK5 3405, HD 160613, HIP 86565, HR 6581, SAO 160747.

Database references
SIMBAD	data

Omicron Serpentis (ο Ser, ο Serpentis) is a solitary star in the Serpens Cauda (tail) section of the equatorial constellation Serpens. Based upon an annual parallax shift of 18.83 mas as seen from Earth, it is located around 173 light years from the Sun. The star is visible to the naked eye with a base apparent visual magnitude of +4.26.

This is a white-hued A-type main sequence star with a stellar classification of A2 Va. It is located on the lower instability strip and is classified as a Delta Scuti type variable star. The apparent magnitude of the star varies in the range 4.26−4.27 with a period of 76 minutes, or 0.053 days.

The star has an estimated 2.13 times the mass of the Sun and about 2.2 times the Sun's radius. It is about half a billion years old and is spinning with a projected rotational velocity of 112.6 km/s. Omicron Serpentis is radiating 42.6 times the solar luminosity from its photosphere at an effective temperature of 8,972 K.

In 1909, the symbiotic nova RT Serpentis appeared near Omicron, although it only reached a maximum magnitude of 10.
