= Coreshine =

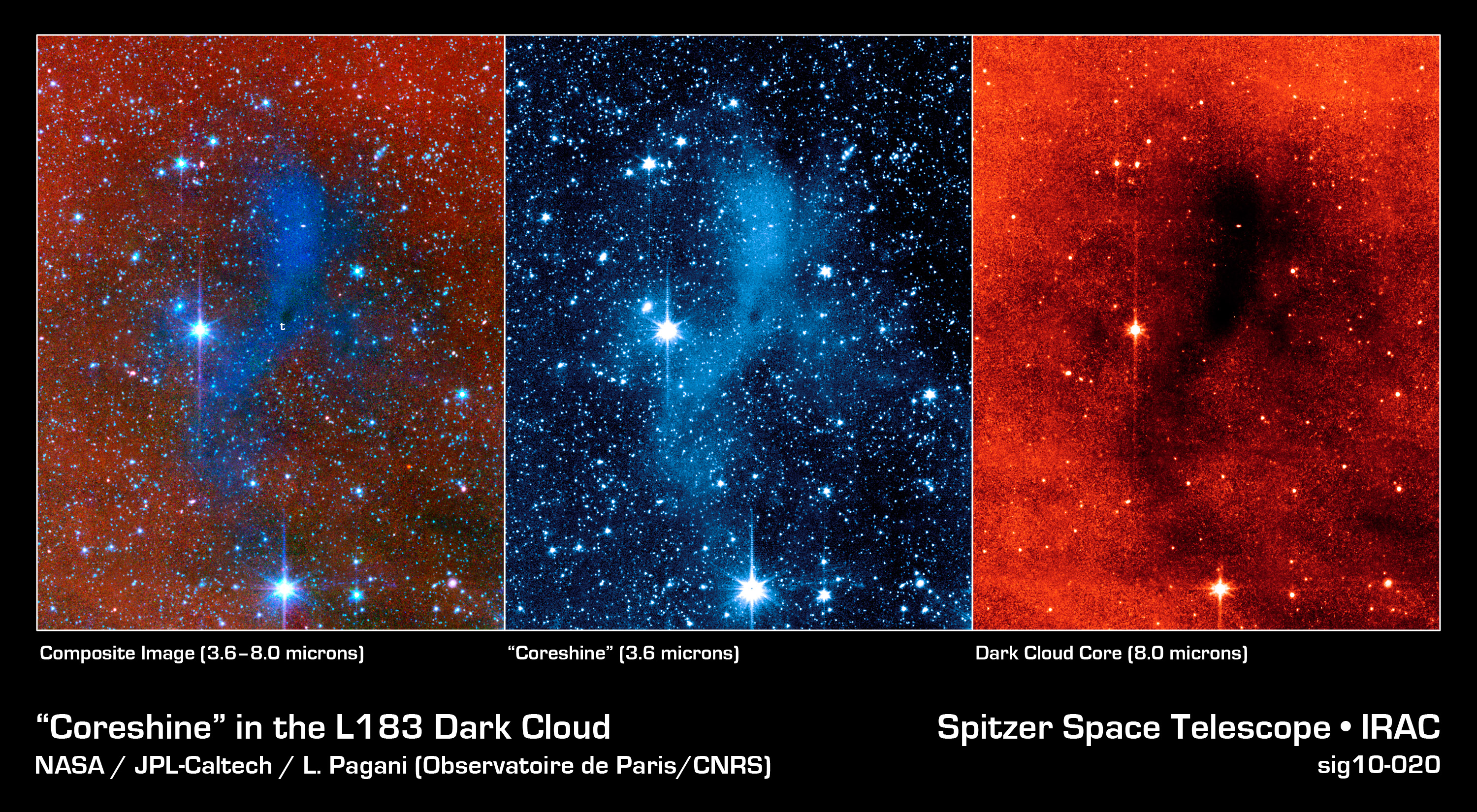

Coreshine is an astronomical term for infrared light scattered by unusually large grains of dust in the denser core regions of molecular clouds and which evidently begin their growth before the start of cloud collapse. These clouds which are opaque to visible light, are a mixture of gas and dust and are the regions where stars are formed.

Coreshine offers a new tool for observing the earliest phases of star formation, a process effectively hidden up to now. The scattered mid-infrared light, found throughout our galaxy, could reveal the origins of the cloud material, the size and density of the dust particles, the age of the core region, the distribution of the dust and gas, and the chemical processes taking place deep inside the cloud.

The phenomenon was first studied seriously with NASA’s Spitzer Space Telescope. Researchers Laurent Pagani (CNRS, Paris Observatory), Jürgen Steinacker (Max Planck Institute for Astronomy) and colleagues from the California Institute of Technology and Laboratoire d’Astrophysique de l’Observatoire de Grenoble, discovered surprisingly bright mid-infrared radiation from the core of the molecular cloud L183 in the constellation Serpens Cauda 360 light-years away. Using computer simulations, it became clear that they were observing light scattered by particles of around 1 micrometer in diameter. In a follow-up they studied 110 molecular clouds, at distances between 300 and 1300 light-years, and which had been part of previous Spitzer surveys. The results showed that coreshine is a widespread phenomenon and was present in about half the clouds studied. Clouds in the southern constellation Vela show no coreshine and it is thought that this has been brought about by recorded supernova explosions in the region, blowing away or destroying larger dust particles.

Coreshine will lead to new projects for both the Spitzer and James Webb Space Telescope, the latter of which is due to be launched in 2021.

== See also ==
- Infrared Space Observatory
