= NGC 5964 =

Galaxy in the constellation Serpens

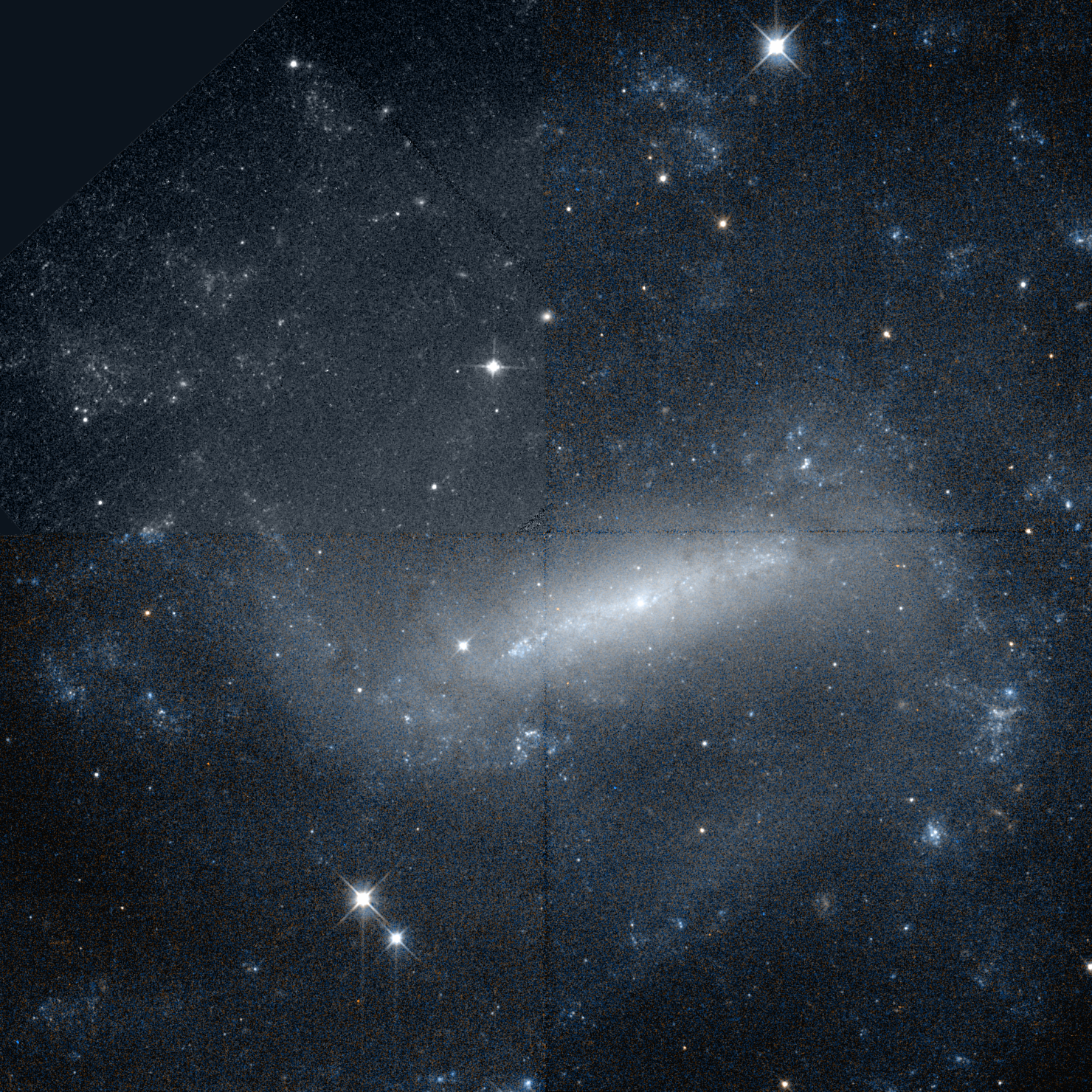
- NGC 5964 imaged by the Hubble Space Telescope

Observation data (J2000 epoch)
- Constellation: Serpens Caput
- Right ascension: 15^{h} 37^{m} 36.3^{s}
- Declination: +5° 58′ 24″
- Redshift: 1447 ± 1 km/s
- Apparent magnitude (V): 12.6

Characteristics
- Type: SB(rs)d
- Apparent size (V): 4.2′ × 3.2′

Other designations
- UGC 9935, PGC 55637

NGC 5964 is a barred spiral galaxy in the constellation Serpens Caput. NGC 5964 is also known by the names IC 4551 and PGC 55637.

NGC 5964 has relatively unwound spiral arms; it lacks the clear defined spiral arms the Milky Way galaxy has. The central bar is very small, long and thin. NGC 5964 thus does not have a galactic habitable zone like the Milky Way. For the Milky Way, the galactic habitable zone is commonly believed to be an annulus with an outer radius of about 10 kiloparsecs and an inner radius close to the Galactic Center, both of which lack hard boundaries.
