= PDS 456 =

Quasar in the constellation Serpens

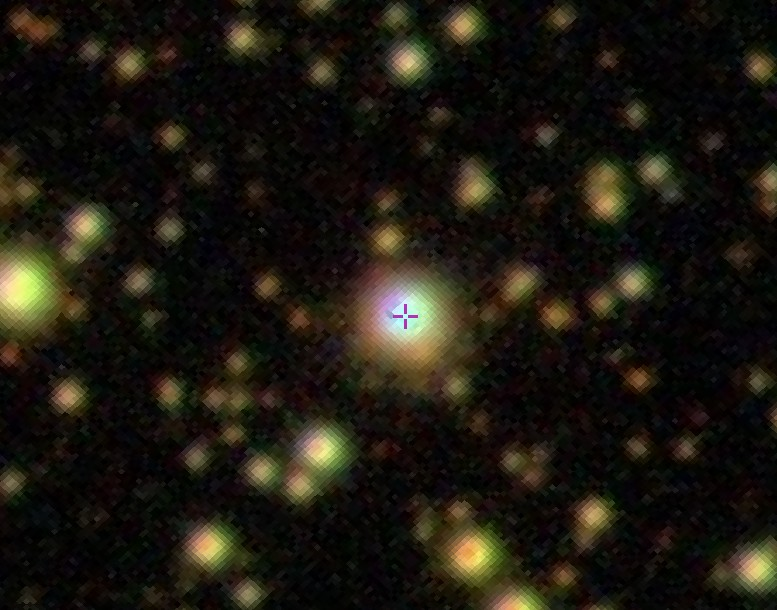
- The quasar PDS 456.

Observation data (J2000.0 epoch)
- Constellation: Serpens
- Right ascension: 17^{h} 28^{m} 19.7906^{s}
- Declination: −14° 15′ 55.816″
- Redshift: 0.185000
- Heliocentric radial velocity: 55,462 km/s
- Distance: 2.177 Gly
- Apparent magnitude (V): 14.03
- Apparent magnitude (B): 14.69

Characteristics
- Type: QSO

Other designations
- QSO B1725-142, IRAS 17254-1413, NVSS J172819-141555, 6dFGS J172819.8-141556

PDS 456 is a relatively nearby radio-quiet quasar located in the constellation of Serpens. This is a luminous active galactic nucleus (AGN) with a redshift of (z) 0.184, first discovered by astronomers conducting the Pico dos Dias survey in 1997. The object is known to have prototypical ionized ultra-fast X-ray outflows and a bolometric luminosity value of 10^{47} erg s^{−1}.

== Description ==
An extremely bright X-ray flare was detected from PDS 456 in September 2018. Based on observations, it showed a flux increase by a factor 4, including its time-scale doubling and a high level of flare energy, exceeding 10^{51} erg. In addition, PDS 456 also displayed X-ray emission hardening following the flare. Radio images by very long baseline interferometry (VLBI) found PDS 456 has a complex nucleus described to be radio-emitting, an extended structure and a jet.

In 2019, observations by the Atacama Large Millimeter Array (ALMA) found PDS 456 to contain kiloparsec-scale molecular outflows. The molecular outflows are estimated to have a mass of 2.5 × 10^{8} M_{☉} while a value of 290 M_{☉} yr^{−1} was calculated for its outflow mass rate. Given its short depletion time, it is estimated the star-formation in PDS 456 would be quenched.

Additionally, disk wind from the accretion disk and signatures of highly ionized gas detected via X-ray broadband spectra of PDS 456, was also present. A supermassive black hole mass of 10^{9.2±0.2} M_{☉} was estimated for the object.
