= 4C 11.50 =

Quasar located in the constellation of Serpens

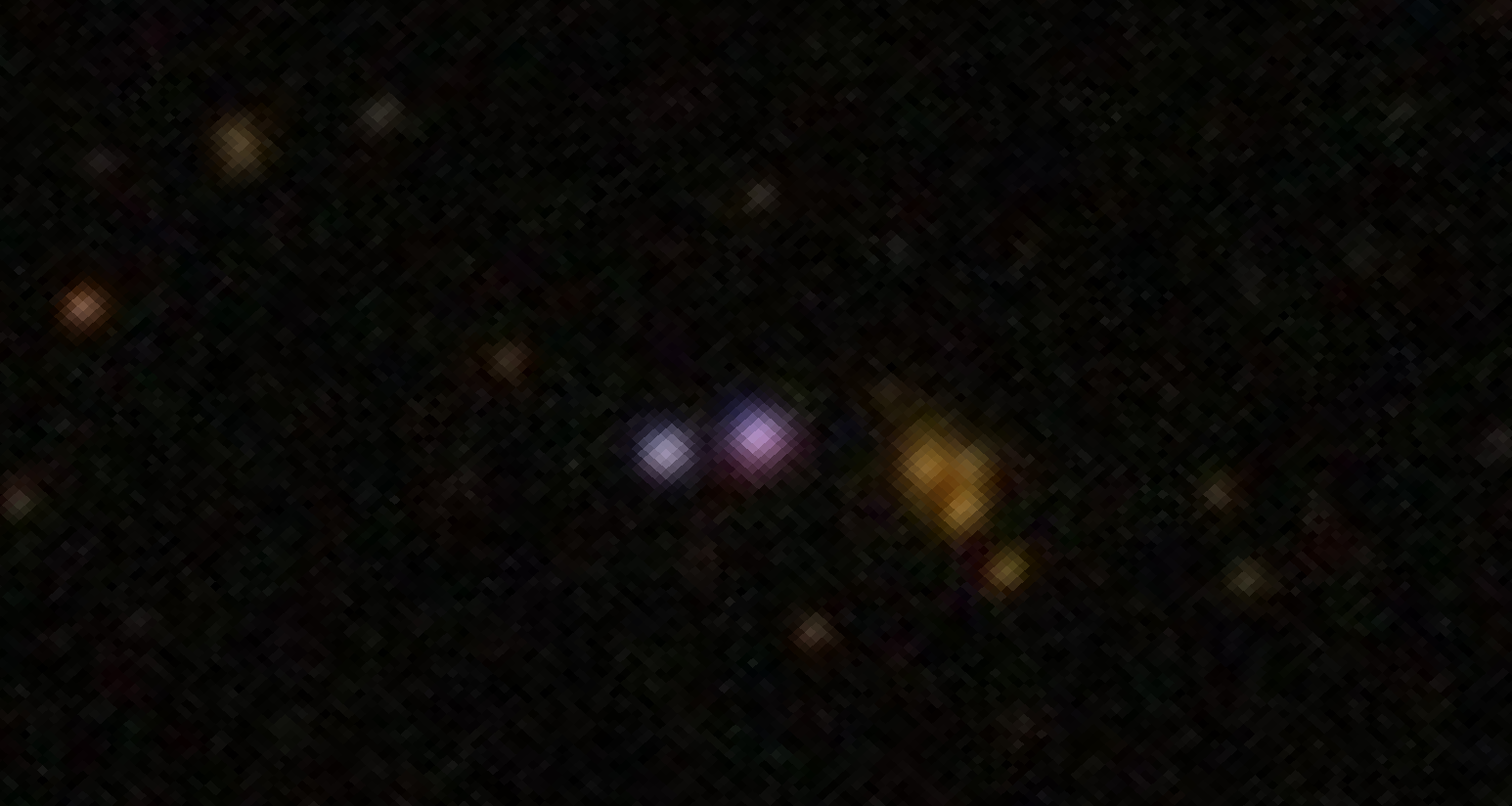
- SDSS image of 4C 11.50

Observation data (J2000.0 epoch)
- Constellation: Serpens
- Right ascension: 15^{h} 50^{m} 43.59^{s}
- Declination: +11° 20′ 47.45″
- Redshift: 0.435980
- Heliocentric radial velocity: 130,704 km/s
- Distance: 4.710 Gly
- Apparent magnitude (V): 17.23

Characteristics
- Type: LPQ;blazar Sy1.5
- Size: ~201,000 ly (61.5 kpc) (estimated)

Other designations
- PKS 1548+114, LEDA 2819018, OR +181, 2MASS J15504359+1120475, SDSS J155043.59+112047.4, MC2 1548+114, RX J1550.7+1120, TXS 1548+114, IERS B1548+114, EF B1548+1129

4C 11.50 known as Q1548+114A, is a radio-loud quasar located in the constellation of Serpens. The redshift of the object is (z) 0.435 and it was first discovered as a double quasar pair by Alan Stockton in July 1974 who found the pair are separated by 2.5 arcseconds with the other quasar located at redshift (z) 1.901. Despite being proposed as a gravitational lens candidate, no second image has been ever detected, and both quasars were later found unrelated to each other based on further spectra studies.

== Description ==
4C 11.50 is classified to have a compact source. When observed in 1974, it is found to contain a dominant compact component coincident together in the position of the quasar with two other components displaying a steep spectrum. The same year, it was classified as a double source which has a separation of 21 arcseconds from each other in a 170° position angle and a detected component hosting much of 20% of the flux density. There are also presence of outer lobe structures in the quasar containing multiple hot spots with the source itself being categorized as bend at 47° from the positions of the bright components.

New observations made with Very Long Baseline Interferometry (VLBI) and Very Large Array (VLA) found the radio structure of 4C 11.50 as different. On milliarcsecond scales, the nucleus of the source appears as weak without any presence of any extended structures. There are two components, mainly a slight resolved component and a weak feature. Observations on large-scale would find the quasar has a much detailed double-lobed structure and a radio jet that is described as straight, leading towards the southeastern direction from the radio core. However, only two jet knots and the northwestern hot spot feature do exhibit signs of linear polarization.

The host galaxy of 4C 11.50 is classified as a spiral galaxy undergoing strong gravitational interactions based on a two-dimensional fitting model and a presence of a possible tidal arm feature by Hubble Space Telescope observations, making this host quite unusual for any of the radio-loud quasars, predominantly hosted by elliptical galaxies. The V-magnitude of the galaxy is estimated to be -22.78 and it has a total host magnitude of -21.32. There are presence of three other galaxies, located in the west direction from the quasar, forming a packed group with each other.

Variability has been detected in 4C 11.50 with its radio core displaying signs of brightening up. The core can also be classified as having an inverted radio spectrum with the total flux density estimated as approximately 250 mJy, suggesting a structure on milliarcsecond scales might be well be present.
