= NGC 6604 =

Open cluster in the constellation of Serpens

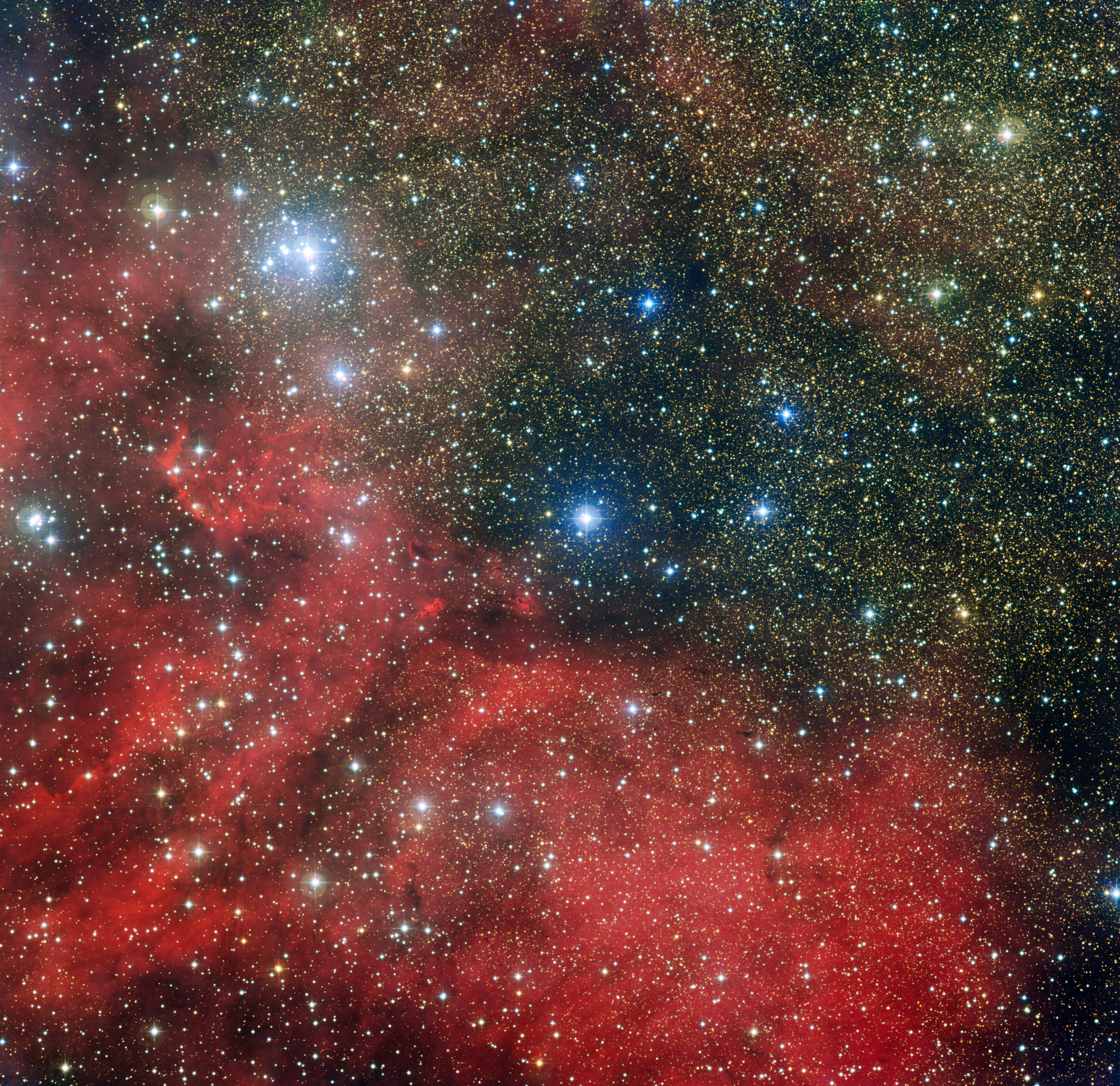
- NGC 6604 and its surroundings taken by the Wide Field Imager attached to the 2.2-metre MPG/ESO telescope at the La Silla Observatory in Chile

Observation data (J2000 epoch)
- Right ascension: 18^{h} 18^{m} 03.0^{s}
- Declination: −12° 14′ 30″
- Distance: 4,580 ly (1,403 pc)
- Apparent magnitude (V): 6.5

Physical characteristics
- Estimated age: 6.5 Myr
- Other designations: NGC 6604, Cr 373, MM 23, OCl 56, C 1815-122, CTB 50, NRL 17, [KPR2004b] 439, Cl Mrk 39, LMH 24, OCISM 11

Associations
- Constellation: Serpens

NGC 6604 is a young open cluster of stars in the equatorial constellation of Serpens, positioned about 1.5° north of the Eagle Nebula (NGC 6611). The cluster was discovered by William Herschel on July 15, 1784. It is located at a distance of 4,580 light years from the Sun, about 210 ly (65 pc) above the galactic plane. NGC 6604 forms the densest part of the Ser OB2 association of co-moving stars.

This cluster is fairly compact with a Trumpler class of I3p, and is still undergoing star formation. It lies at the heart of an H II region with the identifier S54, and the two are most likely linked. The cluster has an estimated age of 6.5 million years and contains several massive stars of the OB type. One of these is the high mass triple star system HD 167971, which includes the over-contact eclipsing binary MY Ser. It is one of the most luminous stars in the galaxy. HD 168112 is another colliding-wind binary in the cluster; both systems are over-luminous in their X-ray emission.
