= Double periodic variable =

Type of stellar binary

A Double Periodic Variable (DPV) is a type of binary star. As the name implies, the systems vary in brightness not only due to eclipses of one star by the other, but also on a cycle of roughly 33 times longer than the orbit. The star gaining mass from the other has a thick disk of material surrounding it, and the systems apparently lose mass cyclically into the interstellar medium over time. The cause for the secondary longer variability still is not established, but it has been proposed to be linked to a magnetic dynamo in the donor (mass transferring) star. A notable example is β Lyrae, itself a prototype eclipsing binary system. The stars are rare, with 21 systems found in the Galaxy and more than 170 in the Magellanic Clouds (Abril 2016).

== List ==
Catalogues of Double Periodic Variables are given by Mennickent, Otero and Kołaczkowski (2016), Pawlak et al. (2013) and Poleski et al. (2010). Some few examples are given below.

The following list contains selected double periodic variables that are of interest to amateur or professional astronomy. Unless otherwise noted, the given magnitudes are in the V-band.

Star	Maximum magnitude	Minimum magnitude	Eclipse period (in days)	Spectral type
V393 Scorpii	7.39	8.31	7.72	B3III
AU Monocerotis	8.20	9.16	11.11	B5IV+F8-G0II-III
