= Serpens =

Constellation split into two non-contiguous parts

- Constellation
- List of stars in Serpens
- Abbreviation: Ser
- Genitive: Serpentis
- Pronunciation: /ˈsɜːrpɪnz/, genitive /sərˈpɛntɪs/
- Symbolism: the Snake
- Right ascension: Serpens Caput: 15^{h} 10.4^{m} –16^{h} 22.5^{m} Serpens Cauda: 17^{h} 16.9^{m} –18^{h} 58.3^{m}
- Declination: Serpens Caput: 25.66°–−03.72° Serpens Cauda: 06.42°–−16.14°
- Area: Serpens Caput: 428 sq. deg. Serpens Cauda: 208 sq. deg. Total: 637 sq. deg. (23rd)
- Main stars: 11
- Bayer/Flamsteed stars: 57
- Stars brighter than 3.00^{m}: 1
- Stars within 10.00 pc (32.62 ly): 2
- Brightest star: α Ser (Unukalhai) (2.63^{m})
- Nearest star: Gliese 701 (HD 165222)
- Messier objects: 2
- Meteor showers: 0
- Bordering constellations: Serpens Caput: Corona Borealis; Boötes; Virgo; Libra; Ophiuchus; Hercules Serpens Cauda: Aquila; Ophiuchus; Sagittarius; Scutum
- Visible at latitudes between +75° and −65°. Best visible at 21:00 (9 p.m.) during the month of July.

Serpens (Ancient Greek: Ὄφις, romanized: Óphis, lit. 'the Serpent') is a constellation in the northern celestial hemisphere. One of the 48 constellations listed by the 2nd-century astronomer Ptolemy, it remains one of the 88 modern constellations designated by the International Astronomical Union. It is unique among the modern constellations in being split into two non-contiguous parts, Serpens Caput (Serpent Head) to the west and Serpens Cauda (Serpent Tail) to the east. Between these two halves lies the constellation of Ophiuchus, the "Serpent-Bearer". In figurative representations, the body of the serpent is represented as passing behind Ophiuchus between Mu Serpentis in Serpens Caput and Nu Serpentis in Serpens Cauda.

The brightest star in Serpens is the red giant star Alpha Serpentis, or Unukalhai, in Serpens Caput, with an apparent magnitude of 2.63. Also located in Serpens Caput are the naked-eye globular cluster Messier 5 and the naked-eye variables R Serpentis and Tau^{4} Serpentis. Notable extragalactic objects include Seyfert's Sextet, one of the densest galaxy clusters known; Arp 220, the prototypical ultraluminous infrared galaxy; and Hoag's Object, the most famous of the very rare class of galaxies known as ring galaxies.

Part of the Milky Way's galactic plane passes through Serpens Cauda, which is therefore rich in galactic deep-sky objects, such as the Eagle Nebula (IC 4703) and its associated star cluster Messier 16. The nebula measures 70 light-years by 50 light-years and contains the Pillars of Creation, three dust clouds that became famous for the image taken by the Hubble Space Telescope. Other striking objects include the Red Square Nebula, one of the few objects in astronomy to take on a square shape; and Westerhout 40, a massive nearby star-forming region consisting of a molecular cloud and an H II region.

== History ==
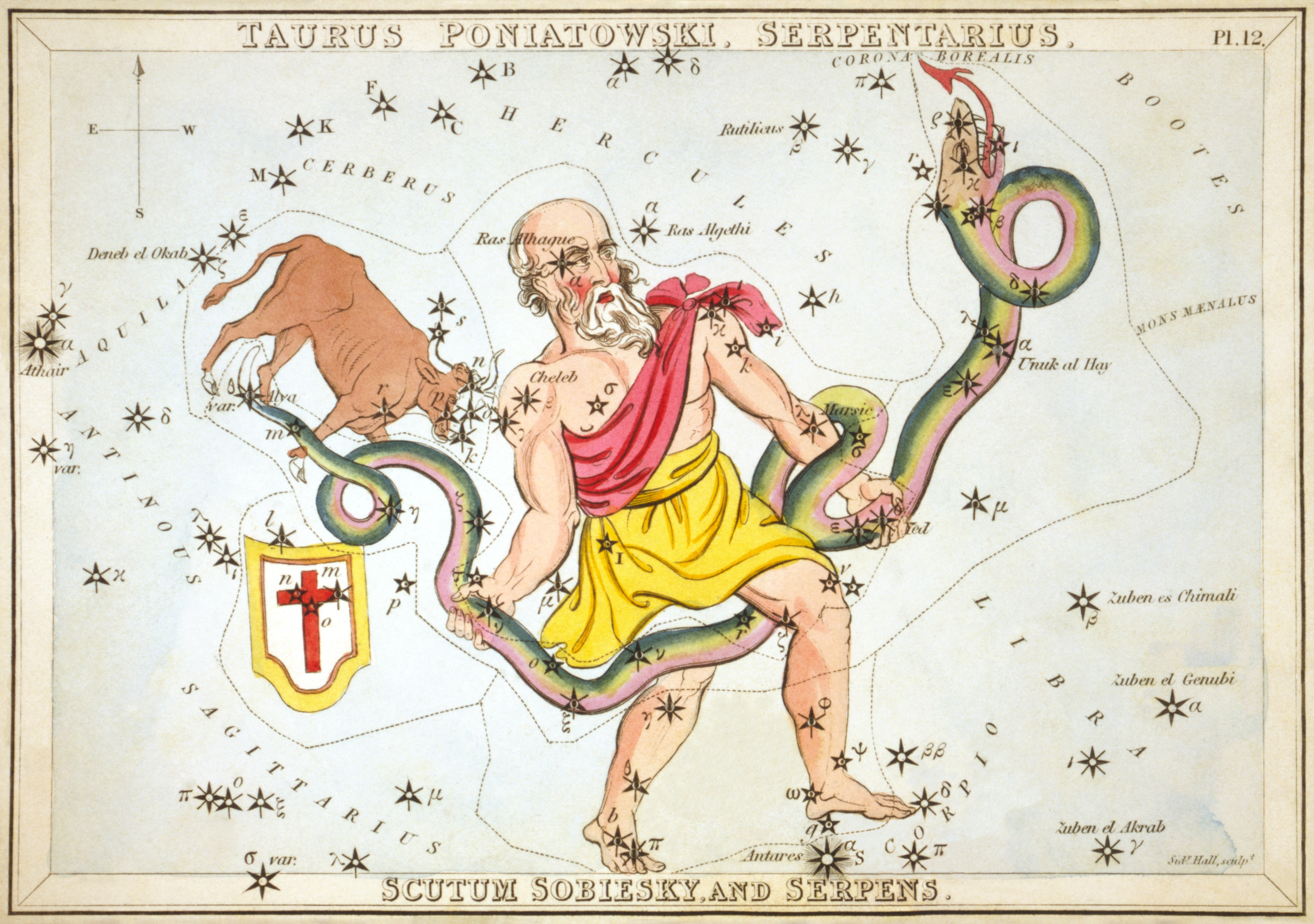
Serpens held by Ophiuchus, as depicted in Urania's Mirror, a set of constellation cards published in London c. 1825. Above the tail of the serpent is the now-obsolete constellation Taurus Poniatovii while below it is Scutum

In Greek mythology, Serpens represents a snake held by the healer Asclepius. Represented in the sky by the constellation Ophiuchus, Asclepius once killed a snake, but the animal was subsequently resurrected after a second snake placed a revival herb on it before its death. As snakes shed their skin every year, they were known as the symbol of rebirth in ancient Greek society, and legend says Asclepius would revive dead humans using the same technique he witnessed. Although this is likely the logic for Serpens' presence with Ophiuchus, the true reason is still not fully known. Sometimes, Serpens was depicted as coiling around Ophiuchus, but the majority of atlases showed Serpens passing either behind Ophiuchus' body or between his legs.

In some ancient atlases, the constellations Serpens and Ophiuchus were depicted as two separate constellations, although more often they were shown as a single constellation. One notable figure to depict Serpens separately was Johann Bayer; thus, Serpens' stars are cataloged with separate Bayer designations from those of Ophiuchus. When Eugène Delporte established modern constellation boundaries in the 1920s, he elected to depict the two separately. However, this posed the problem of how to disentangle the two constellations, with Deporte deciding to split Serpens into two areas—the head and the tail—separated by the continuous Ophiuchus. These two areas became known as Serpens Caput and Serpens Cauda, caput being the Latin word for head and cauda the Latin word for tail.

In Chinese astronomy, most of the stars of Serpens represented part of a wall surrounding a marketplace, known as Tianshi, which was in Ophiuchus and part of Hercules. Serpens also contains a few Chinese constellations. Two stars in the tail represented part of Shilou, the tower with the market office. Another star in the tail represented Liesi, jewel shops. One star in the head (Mu Serpentis) marked Tianru, the crown prince's wet nurse, or sometimes rain.

There were two "serpent" constellations in Babylonian astronomy, known as Mušḫuššu and Bašmu. It appears that Mušḫuššu was depicted as a hybrid of a dragon, a lion and a bird, and loosely corresponded to Hydra. Bašmu was a horned serpent (cf. Ningishzida) and roughly corresponds to the Ὄφις constellation of Eudoxus of Cnidus on which the Ὄφις (Serpens) of Ptolemy is based.

== Characteristics ==
Serpens is the only one of the 88 modern constellations to be split into two disconnected regions in the sky: Serpens Caput (the head) and Serpens Cauda (the tail). The constellation is also unusual in that it depends on another constellation for context; specifically, it is being held by the Serpent Bearer Ophiuchus.

Serpens Caput is bordered by Libra to the south, Virgo and Boötes to the west, Corona Borealis to the north, and Ophiuchus and Hercules to the east; Serpens Cauda is bordered by Sagittarius to the south, Scutum and Aquila to the east, and Ophiuchus to the north and west. Covering 636.9 square degrees total, it ranks 23rd of the 88 constellations in size. It appears prominently in both the northern and southern skies during the Northern Hemisphere's summer. Its main asterism consists of 11 stars, and 108 stars in total are brighter than magnitude 6.5, the traditional limit for naked-eye visibility.

Serpens Caput's boundaries, as set by Belgian astronomer Eugène Delporte in 1930, are defined by a 10-sided polygon, while Serpens Cauda's are defined by a 22-sided polygon. In the equatorial coordinate system, the right ascension coordinates of Serpens Caput's borders lie between 15^{h} 10.4^{m} and 16^{h} 22.5^{m} , while the declination coordinates are between 25.66° and −03.72°. Serpens Cauda's boundaries lie between right ascensions of 17^{h} 16.9^{m} and 18^{h} 58.3^{m} and declinations of 06.42° and −16.14°. The International Astronomical Union (IAU) adopted the three-letter abbreviation "Ser" for the constellation in 1922.

== Features ==
=== Stars ===
==== Head stars ====
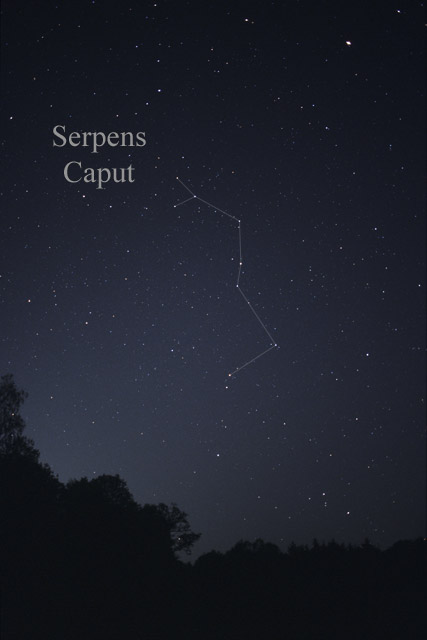
The constellation Serpens (Caput) as it can be seen by the naked eye

Marking the heart of the serpent is the constellation's brightest star, Alpha Serpentis. Traditionally called Unukalhai, is a red giant of spectral type K2III located approximately 23 parsecs distant with a visual magnitude of 2.630 ± 0.009, meaning it can easily be seen with the naked eye even in areas with substantial light pollution. A faint companion is in orbit around the red giant star, although it is not visible to the naked eye. Situated near Alpha is Lambda Serpentis, a magnitude 4.42 ± 0.05 star rather similar to the Sun positioned only 12 parsecs away. It has an exoplanet orbiting around it. Another solar analog in Serpens is the primary of Psi Serpentis, a binary star located slightly further away at approximately 14 parsecs.

Beta (the proper name is Zhou since 5 December 2024), Gamma, and Iota Serpentis form a distinctive triangular shape marking the head of the snake, with Kappa Serpentis (the proper name is Gudja) being roughly midway between Gamma and Iota. The brightest of the four with an apparent magnitude of roughly 3.67, Beta Serpentis is a white main-sequence star roughly 160 parsecs distant. It is likely that a nearby 10th-magnitude star is physically associated with Beta, although it is not certain. The Mira variable R Serpentis, situated between Beta and Gamma, is visible to the naked eye at its maximum of 5th-magnitude, but, typical of Mira variables, it can fade to below magnitude 14. Gamma Serpentis itself is an F-type subgiant located only 11 parsecs distant and thus is quite bright, being of magnitude 3.84 ± 0.05. The star is known to show solar-like oscillations. Iota Serpentis is a binary star system.

Delta Serpentis, forming part of the body of the snake between the heart and the head, is a multiple star system positioned around 70 parsecs from Earth. Consisting of four stars, the system has a total apparent magnitude of 3.79 as viewed from Earth, although two of the stars, with a combined apparent magnitude of 3.80, provide nearly all the light. The primary, a white subgiant, is a Delta Scuti variable with an average apparent magnitude of 4.23. Positioned very near Delta, both in the night sky and likely in actual space at an estimated distance of around 70 parsecs, is the barium star 16 Serpentis. Another notable variable star visible to the naked eye is Chi Serpentis, an Alpha² Canum Venaticorum variable situated midway between Delta and Beta which varies from its median brightness of 5.33 by 0.03 magnitudes over a period of approximately 1.5 days. Chi Serpentis is a chemically peculiar star.

The two stars in Serpens Caput that form part of the Snake's body below the heart are Epsilon and Mu Serpentis, both third-magnitude A-type main-sequence stars. Both have a peculiarity: Epsilon is an Am star, while Mu is a binary. Located slightly northwest of Mu is 36 Serpentis, another A-type main-sequence star. This star also has a peculiarity; it is a binary with the primary component being a Lambda Boötis star, meaning that it has solar-like amounts of carbon, nitrogen, and oxygen, while containing very low amounts of iron peak elements. The secondary star has also been a source of X-ray emissions. 25 Serpentis, positioned a few degrees northeast of Mu Serpentis, is a spectroscopic binary consisting of a hot B-type giant and an A-type main-sequence star. The primary is a slowly pulsating B star, which causes the system to vary by 0.03 magnitudes.

Serpens Caput contains many RR Lyrae variables, although most are too faint to be seen without professional photography. The brightest is VY Serpentis, only of 10th magnitude. This star's period has been increasing by approximately 1.2 seconds per century. A variable star of a different kind is Tau^{4} Serpentis, a cool red giant that pulsates between magnitudes 5.89 and 7.07 in 87 days. This star has been found to display an inverse P Cygni profile, where cold infalling gas on to the star creates redshifted hydrogen absorption lines next to the normal emission lines.

Several stars in Serpens have been found to have planets. The brightest, Omega Serpentis, located between Epsilon and Mu, is an orange giant with a planet of at least 1.7 Jupiter-masses. NN Serpentis, an eclipsing post-common-envelope binary consisting of a white dwarf and a red dwarf, is very likely to have two planets causing variations in the period of the eclipses. Although it does not have a planet, the solar analog HD 137510 has been found to have a brown dwarf companion within the brown-dwarf desert.

PSR B1534+11 is a system consisting of two neutron stars orbiting each other, one of which is a pulsar with a period of 37.9 milliseconds. Situated approximately 1000 parsecs distant, the system was used to test Albert Einstein's theory of general relativity, validating the system's relativistic parameters to within 0.2% of values predicted by the theory. The X-ray emission from the system has been found to be present when the non-pulsar star intersects the equatorial pulsar wind of the pulsar, and the system's orbit has been found to vary slightly.

==== Tail stars ====
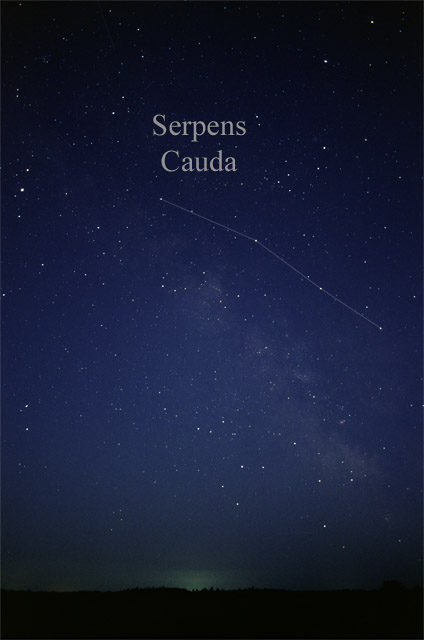
The constellation Serpens (Cauda) as it can be seen by the naked eye

The brightest star in the tail, Eta Serpentis, is similar to Alpha Serpentis' primary in that it is a red giant of spectral class K. This star, however, is known to exhibit solar-like oscillations over a period of approximately 2.16 hours. The other two stars in Serpens Cauda forming its asterism are Theta and Xi Serpentis. Xi, where the asterism crosses over to Mu Serpentis in the head, is a triple star system located approximately 105 parsecs away. Two of the stars, with a combined apparent magnitude of around 3.5, form a spectroscopic binary with an angular separation of only 2.2 milliarcseconds, and thus cannot be resolved with modern equipment. The primary is a white giant with an excess of strontium. Theta, forming the tip of the tail, is also a multiple system, consisting of two A-type main-sequence stars with a combined apparent magnitude of around 4.1 separated by almost half an arcminute. There is also a third G-type star with a mass and radius similar to that of the Sun.

Lying near the boundary with Ophiuchus are Zeta, Nu, and Omicron Serpentis. All three are 4th-magnitude main-sequence stars, with Nu and Omicron being of spectral type A and Zeta being of spectral type F. Nu is a single star with a 9th-magnitude visual companion, while Omicron is a Delta Scuti variable with amplitude variations of 0.01 magnitudes. In 1909, the symbiotic nova RT Serpentis appeared near Omicron, although it only reached a maximum magnitude of 10.

The star system 59 Serpentis, also known as d Serpentis, is a triple star system consisting of a spectroscopic binary containing an A-type star and an orange giant and an orange giant secondary. The system shows irregular variations in brightness between magnitudes 5.17 and 5.2. In 1970, the nova FH Serpentis appeared just slightly north of 59 Serpentis, reaching a maximum brightness of 4.5. Also near 59 Serpentis in the Serpens Cloud are several Orion variables. MWC 297 is a Herbig Be star that in 1994 exhibited a large X-ray flare and increased in X-ray luminosity by five times before returning to the quiescent state. The star also appears to possess a circumstellar disk. Another Orion variable in the region is VV Serpentis, a Herbig Ae star that has been found to exhibit Delta Scuti pulsations. VV Serpentis has also, like MWC 297, been found to have a dusty disk surrounding it, and is also a UX Orionis star, meaning that it shows irregular variations in its brightness.

The star HR 6958, also known as MV Serpentis, is an Alpha^{2} Canum Venaticorum variable that is faintly visible to the naked eye. The star's metal abundance is ten times higher than the Sun for most metals at the iron peak and up to 1,000 times more for heavier elements. It has also been found to contain excess silicon. Barely visible to the naked eye is HD 172365, a likely post-blue straggler in the open cluster IC 4756 that contains a large excess of lithium. HD 172189, also located in IC 4756, is an Algol variable eclipsing binary with a 5.70 day period. The primary star in the system is also a Delta Scuti variable, undergoing multiple pulsation frequencies, which, combined with the eclipses, causes the system to vary by around a tenth of a magnitude.

As the galactic plane passes through it, Serpens Cauda contains many massive OB stars. Several of these are visible to the naked eye, such as NW Serpentis, an early Be star that has been found to be somewhat variable. The variability is interesting; according to one study, it could be one of the first discovered hybrids between Beta Cephei variables and slowly pulsating B stars. Although not visible to the naked eye, HD 167971 (MY Serpentis) is a Beta Lyrae variable triple system consisting of three very hot O-type stars. A member of the cluster NGC 6604, the two eclipsing stars are both blue giants, with one being of the very early spectral type O7.5III. The remaining star is either a blue giant or supergiant of a late O or early B spectral type. Also an eclipsing binary, the HD 166734 system consists of two O-type blue supergiants in orbit around each other. Less extreme in terms of mass and temperature is HD 161701, a spectroscopic binary consisting of a B-type primary and an Ap secondary, although it is the only known spectroscopic binary to consist of a star with excess of mercury and manganese and an Ap star.

South of the Eagle Nebula on the border with Sagittarius is the eclipsing binary W Serpentis, whose primary is a white giant that is interacting with the secondary. The system has been found to contain an accretion disk, and was one of the first discovered Serpentids, which are eclipsing binaries containing exceptionally strong far-ultraviolet spectral lines. It is suspected that such Serpentids are in an earlier evolutionary phase, and will evolve first into double periodic variables and then classical Algol variables. Also near the Eagle Nebula is the eclipsing Wolf–Rayet binary CV Serpentis, consisting of a Wolf–Rayet star and a hot O-type subgiant. The system is surrounded by a ring-shaped nebula, likely formed during the Wolf–Rayet phase of the primary. The eclipses of the system vary erratically, and although there are two theories as to why, neither of them is completely consistent with current understanding of stars.

Serpens Cauda contains a few X-ray binaries. One of these, GX 17+2, is a low-mass X-ray binary consisting of a neutron star and, as in all low-mass X-ray binaries, a low-mass star. The system has been classified as a Sco-like Z source, meaning that its accretion is near the Eddington limit. The system has also been found to approximately every 3 days brighten by around 3.5 K-band magnitudes, possibly due to the presence of a synchrotron jet. Another low-mass X-ray binary, Serpens X-1, undergoes occasional X-ray bursts. One in particular lasted nearly four hours, possibly explained by the burning of carbon in "a heavy element ocean".

Φ 332 (Finsen 332) is a tiny and difficult double-double star at 18:45 / +5°30', named Tweedledee and Tweedledum by South African astronomer William Stephen Finsen, who was struck by the nearly identical position angles and separations at the time of his 1953 discovery. Gliese 710 is a star that is expected to pass very close to the Solar System in around 1.29 million years.

=== Deep-sky objects ===
==== Head objects ====
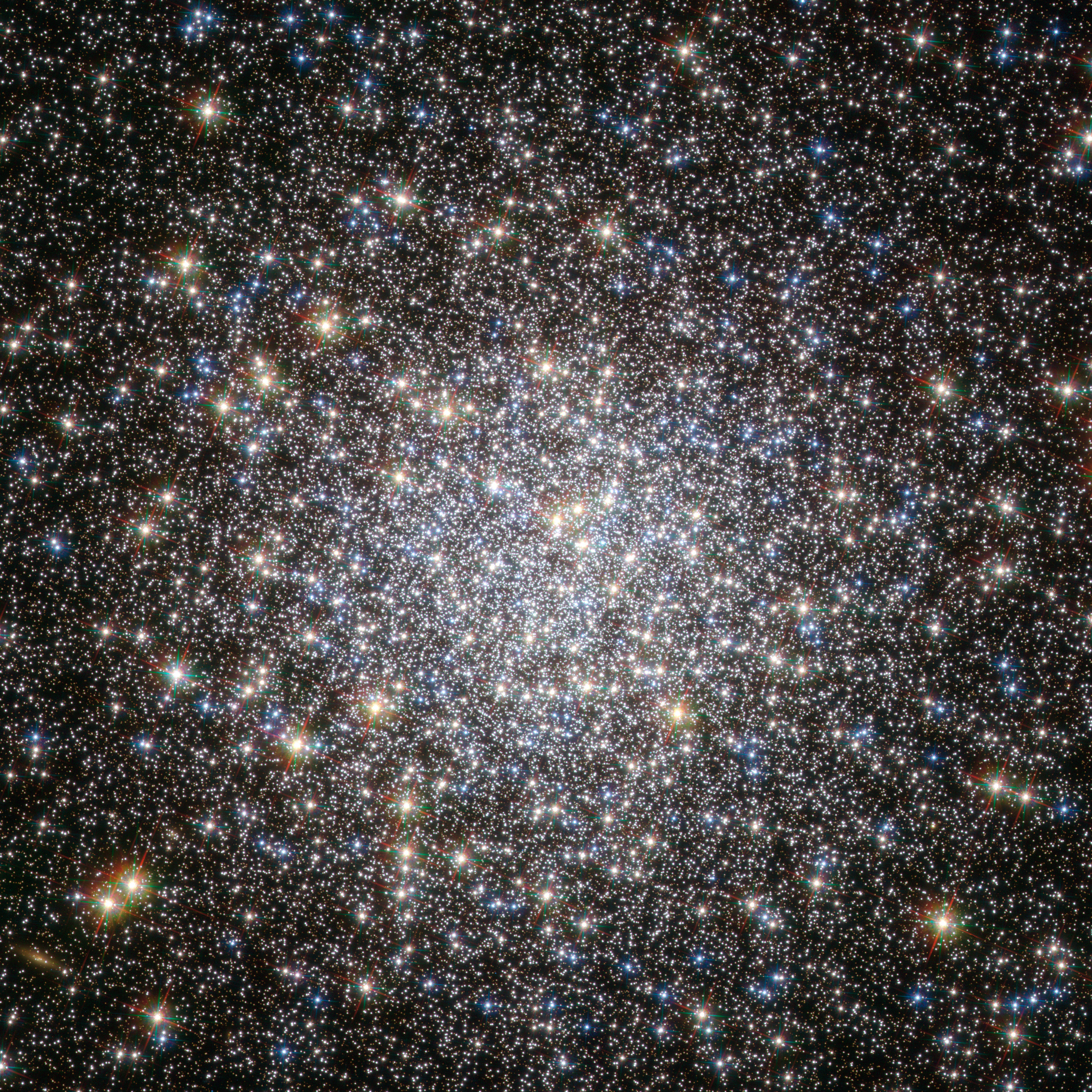
Messier 5, a globular cluster that can be seen with the naked eye under good conditions

As the galactic plane does not pass through this part of Serpens, a view to many galaxies beyond it is possible. However, a few structures of the Milky Way Galaxy are present in Serpens Caput, such as Messier 5, a globular cluster positioned approximately 8° southwest of α Serpentis, next to the star 5 Serpentis. Barely visible to the naked eye under good conditions, and is located approximately 25,000 ly distant. Messier 5 contains a large number of known RR Lyrae variable stars, and is receding from us at over 50 km/s. The cluster contains two millisecond pulsars, one of which is in a binary, allowing the proper motion of the cluster to be measured. The binary could help our understanding of neutron degenerate matter; the current median mass, if confirmed, would exclude any "soft" equation of state for such matter. The cluster has been used to test for magnetic dipole moments in neutrinos, which could shed light on some hypothetical particles such as the axion. The brightest stars in Messier 5 are around magnitude 10.6, and the globular cluster was first observed by William Herschel in 1791.

Another globular cluster is Palomar 5, found just south of Messier 5. Many stars are leaving this globular cluster due to the Milky Way's gravity, forming a tidal tail over 30000 light-years long. It is over 11 billion years old. It has also been flattened and distorted by tidal effects.

The L134/L183 is a dark nebula complex that, along with a third cloud, is likely formed by fragments of a single original cloud located 36 degrees away from the galactic plane, a large distance for dark nebulae. The entire complex is thought to be around 140 parsecs distant. L183, also referred to as L134N, is home to several infrared sources, indicating pre-stellar sources thought to present the first known observation of the contraction phase between cloud cores and prestellar cores. The core is split into three regions, with a combined mass of around 25 solar masses.

Outside of the Milky Way, there are no bright deep-sky objects for amateur astronomers in Serpens Caput, with nothing else above 10th magnitude. The brightest is NGC 5962, a spiral galaxy positioned around 28 megaparsecs distant with an apparent magnitude of 11.34. Two supernovae have been observed in the galaxy, and NGC 5962 has two satellite galaxies. Slightly fainter is NGC 5921, a barred spiral galaxy with a LINER-type active galactic nucleus situated somewhat closer at a distance of 21 megaparsecs. A type II supernova was observed in this galaxy in 2001 and was designated SN 2001X. Fainter still are the spirals NGC 5964 and NGC 6118, with the latter being host to the supernova SN 2004dk.

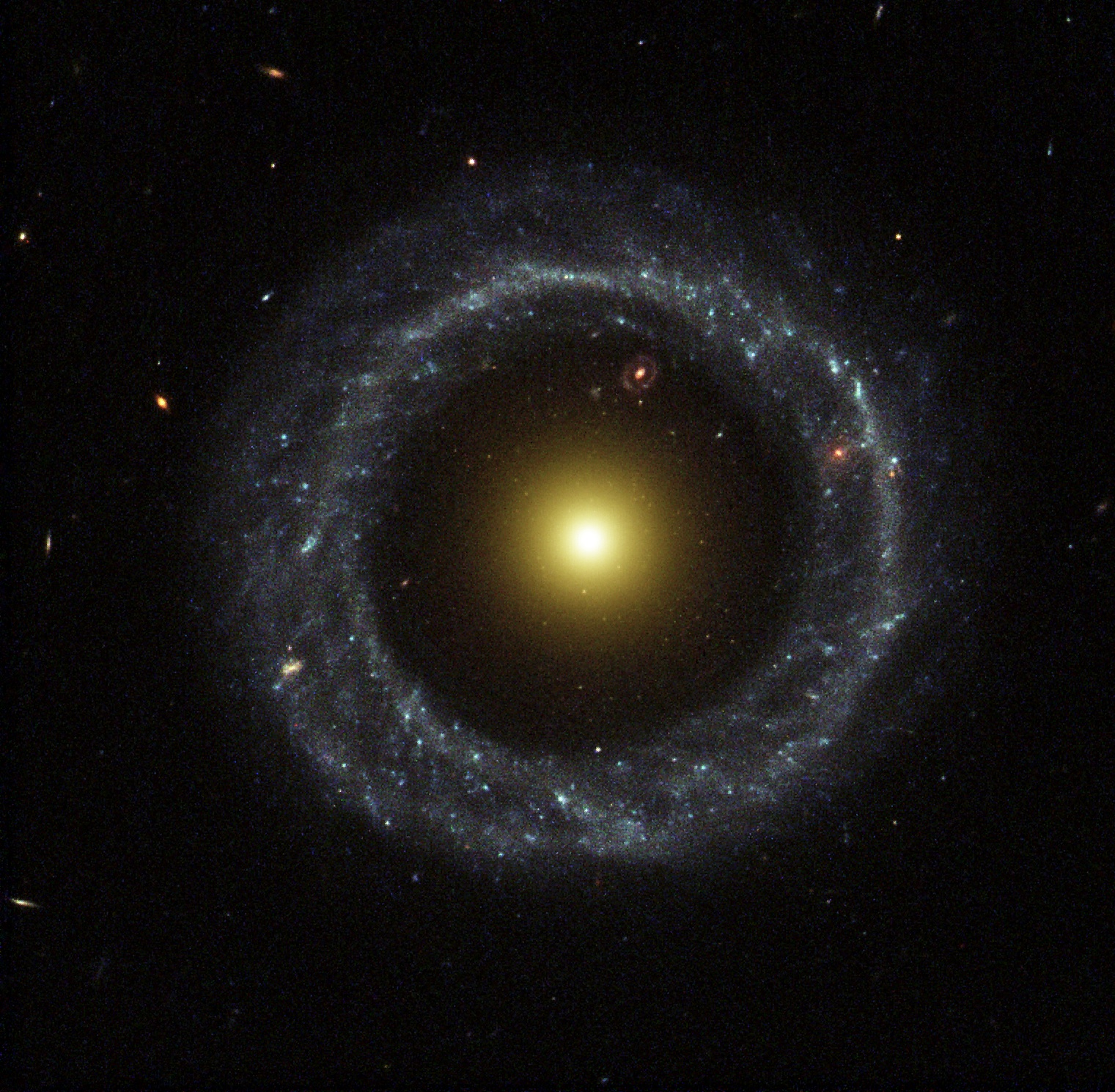
Hoag's Object, a galaxy in Serpens and a member of the very rare class known as ring galaxies.

Hoag's Object, located 600 million light-years from Earth, is a member of the very rare class of galaxies known as ring galaxies. The outer ring is largely composed of young blue stars while the core is made up of older yellow stars. The predominant theory regarding its formation is that the progenitor galaxy was a barred spiral galaxy whose arms had velocities too great to keep the galaxy's coherence and therefore detached. Arp 220 is another unusual galaxy in Serpens. The prototypical ultraluminous infrared galaxy, Arp 220 is somewhat closer than Hoag's Object at 250 million light-years from Earth. It consists of two large spiral galaxies in the process of colliding with their nuclei orbiting at a distance of 1,200 light-years, causing extensive star formation throughout both components. It possesses a large cluster of more than a billion stars, partially covered by thick dust clouds near one of the galaxies' core. Another interacting galaxy pair, albeit in an earlier stage, consists of the galaxies NGC 5953 and NGC 5954. In this case, both are active galaxies, with the former a Seyfert 2 galaxy and the latter a LINER-type galaxy. Both are undergoing a burst of star formation triggered by the interaction.

Seyfert's Sextet is a group of six galaxies, four of which are interacting gravitationally and two of which simply appear to be a part of the group despite their greater distance. The gravitationally bound cluster lies at a distance of 190 million light-years from Earth and is approximately 100,000 light-years across, making Seyfert's Sextet one of the densest galaxy groups known. Astronomers predict that the four interacting galaxies will eventually merge to form a large elliptical galaxy. The radio source 3C 326 was originally thought to emanate from a giant elliptical galaxy. However, in 1990, it was shown that the source is instead a brighter, smaller galaxy a few arcseconds north. This object, designated 3C 326 N, has enough gas for star formation, but is being inhibited due to the energy from the radio galaxy nucleus.

A much larger galaxy cluster is the redshift-0.0354 Abell 2063. The cluster is thought to be interacting with the nearby galaxy group MKW 3s, based on radial velocity measurements of galaxies and the positioning of the cD galaxy at the center of Abell 2063. The active galaxy at the center of MKW 3s—NGC 5920—appears to be creating a bubble of hot gas from its radio activity. Near the 5th-magnitude star Pi Serpentis lies AWM 4, a cluster containing an excess of metals in the intracluster medium. The central galaxy, NGC 6051, is a radio galaxy that is probably responsible for this enrichment. Similar to AWM 4, the cluster Abell 2052 has central cD radio galaxy, 3C 317. This radio galaxy is believed to have restarted after a period of inactivity less than 200 years ago. The galaxy has over 40,000 known globular clusters, the highest known total of any galaxy as of 2002.

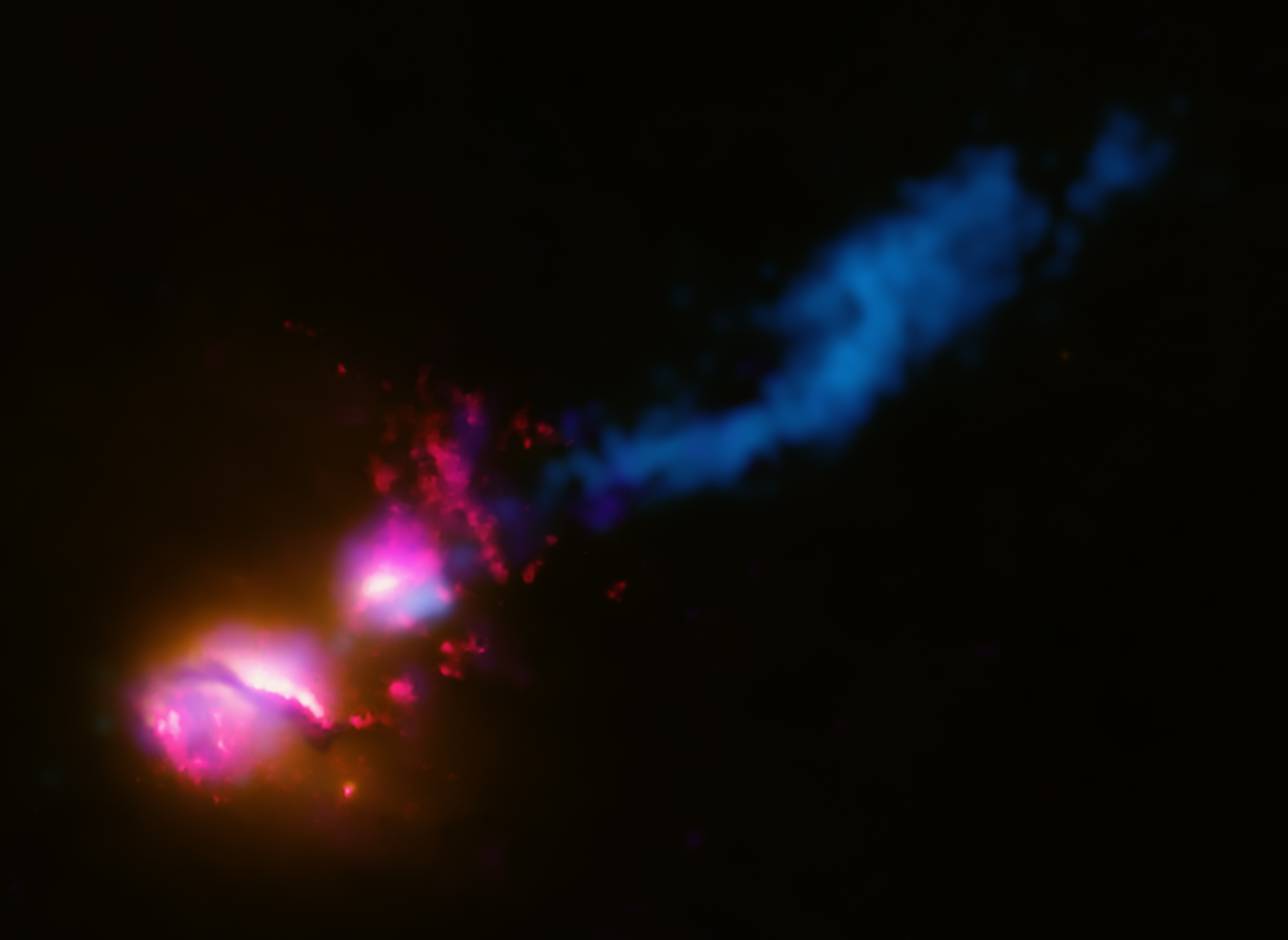
A composite image of 3C 321, a merging active galaxy pair

Consisting of two quasars with a separation of less than 5 arcseconds, the quasar pair 4C 11.50 is one of the visually closest pairs of quasars in the sky. The two have markedly different redshifts, however, and are thus unrelated. The foreground member of the pair (4C 11.50 A) does not have enough mass to refract light from the background component (4C 11.50 B) enough to produce a lensed image, although it does have a true companion of its own. An even stranger galaxy pair is 3C 321. Unlike the previous pair, the two galaxies making up 3C 321 are interacting with each other and are in the process of merging. Both members appear to be active galaxies; the primary radio galaxy may be responsible for the activity in the secondary by means of the former's jet driving material onto the latter's supermassive black hole.

An example of gravitational lensing is found in the radio galaxy 3C 324. First thought to be a single overluminous radio galaxy with a redshift of z = 1.206, it was found in 1987 to actually be two galaxies, with the radio galaxy at the aforementioned redshift being lensed by another galaxy at redshift z = 0.845. The first example of a multiply-imaged radio galaxy discovered, the source appears to be an elliptical galaxy with a dust lane obscuring our view of the visual and ultraviolet emission from the nucleus. In even shorter wavelengths, the BL Lac object PG 1553+113 is a heavy emitter of gamma rays. This object is the most distant found to emit photons with energies in the TeV range as of 2007. The spectrum is unique, with hard emission in some ranges of the gamma-ray spectrum in stark contrast to soft emission in others. In 2012, the object flared in the gamma-ray spectrum, tripling in luminosity for two nights, allowing the redshift to be accurately measured as z = 0.49. Long-term monitoring of PG 1553+113 with the Fermi Large Area Telescope has revealed quasi-periodic gamma-ray variability on a timescale of approximately 2.1–2.2 years. First reported in 2015, this modulation was subsequently confirmed using 15 years of gamma-ray observations, with a reported statistical significance of approximately 4σ. A separate analysis of long-term X-ray observations by Aniello et al. (2024) reported evidence of a shorter modulation period of approximately 1.4 years, suggesting that the variability patterns may differ across energy bands.

Several gamma-ray bursts (GRBs) have been observed in Serpens Caput, such as GRB 970111, one of the brightest GRBs observed. An optical transient event associated with this GRB has not been found, despite its intensity. The host galaxy initially also proved elusive, however it now appears that the host is a Seyfert I galaxy located at redshift z = 0.657. The X-ray afterglow of the GRB has also been much fainter than for other dimmer GRBs. More distant is GRB 060526 (redshift z = 3.221), from which X-ray and optical afterglows were detected. This GRB was very faint for a long-duration GRB.

==== Tail objects ====
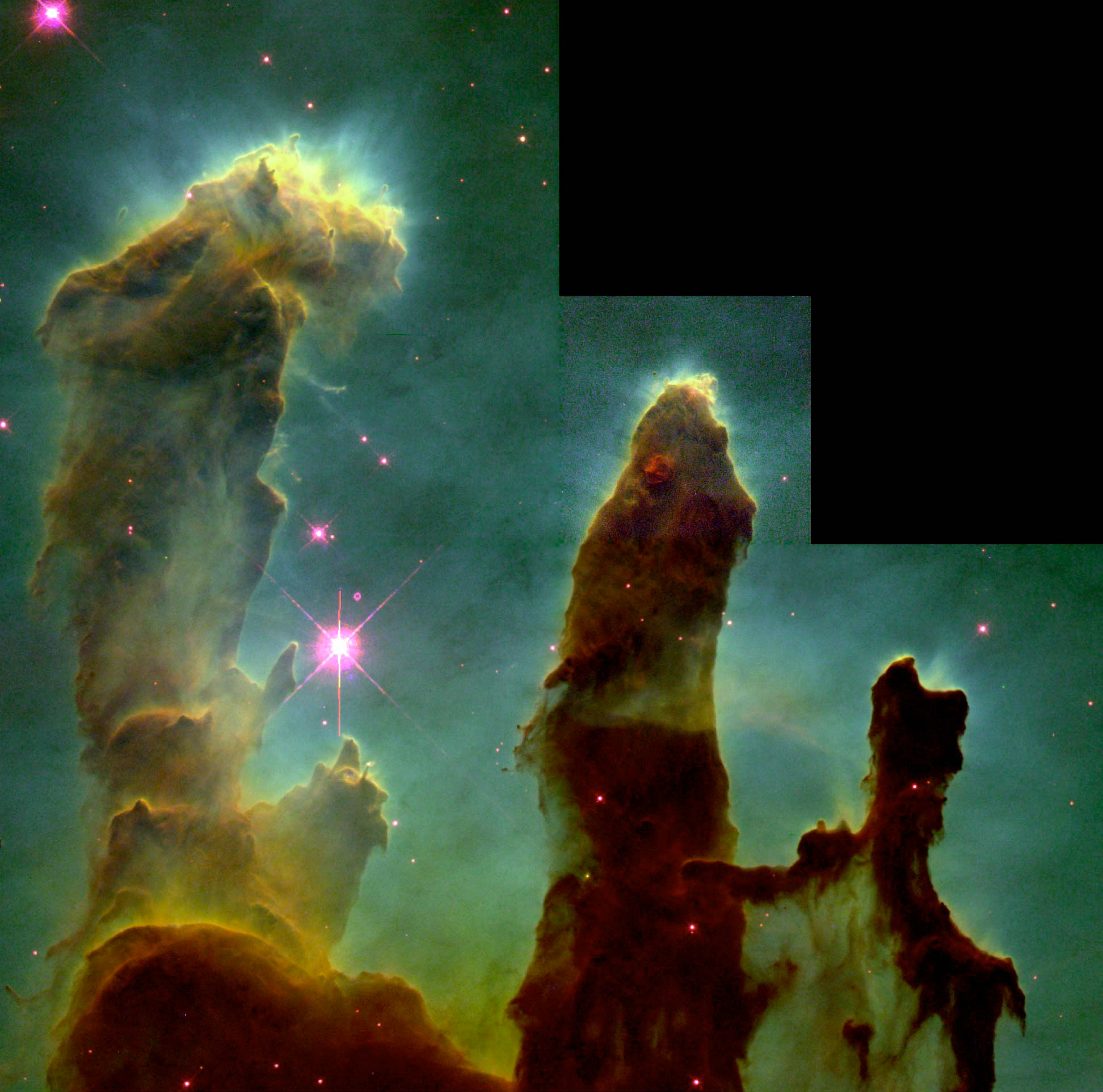
The Pillars of Creation, a well-known star-forming region in the Eagle Nebula made famous by this Hubble photograph

Part of the galactic plane passes through the tail, and thus Serpens Cauda is rich in deep-sky objects within the Milky Way galaxy. The Eagle Nebula and its associated star cluster, Messier 16 lie around 5,700 light-years from Earth in the direction of the Galactic Center. The nebula measures 70 light-years by 50 light-years and contains the Pillars of Creation, three dust clouds that became famous for the image taken by the Hubble Space Telescope. The stars being born in the Eagle Nebula, added to those with an approximate age of 5 million years have an average temperature of 45,000 kelvins and produce prodigious amounts of radiation that will eventually destroy the dust pillars. Despite its fame, the Eagle Nebula is fairly dim, with an integrated magnitude of approximately 6.0. The star-forming regions in the nebula are often evaporating gaseous globules; unlike Bok globules they only hold one protostar.

North of Messier 16, at a distance of approximately 2000 parsecs, is the OB association Serpens OB2, containing over 100 OB stars. Around 5 million years old, the association appears to still contain star-forming regions, and the light from its stars is illuminating the HII region S 54. Within this HII region is the open cluster NGC 6604, which is the same age as the surrounding OB association, and the cluster is now thought to simply be the densest part of it. The cluster appears to be producing a thermal chimney of ionized gas, caused by the interaction of the gas from the galactic disk with the galactic halo.

Another open cluster in Serpens Cauda is IC 4756, containing at least one naked-eye star, HD 172365 (another naked-eye star in the vicinity, HD 171586, is most likely unrelated). Positioned approximately 440 parsecs distant, the cluster is estimated to be around 800 million years old, quite old for an open cluster. Despite the presence of the Milky Way in Serpens Cauda, one globular cluster can be found: NGC 6535, although invisible to the naked eye, can be made out in small telescopes just north of Zeta Serpentis. Rather small and sparse for a globular cluster, this cluster contains no known RR Lyrae variables, which is unusual for a globular cluster.

MWC 922 is a star surrounded by a planetary nebula. Dubbed the Red Square Nebula due to its similarities to the Red Rectangle Nebula, the planetary nebula appears to be a nearly perfect square with a dark band around the equatorial regions. The nebula contains concentric rings, which are similar to those seen in the supernova SN 1987A. MWC 922 itself is an FS Canis Majoris variable, meaning that it is a Be star containing exceptionally bright hydrogen emission lines as well as select forbidden lines, likely due to the presence of a close binary. East of Xi Serpentis is another planetary nebula, Abell 41, containing the binary star MT Serpentis at its center. The nebula appears to have a bipolar structure, and the axis of symmetry of the nebula has been found to be within 5° of the line perpendicular to the orbital plane of the stars, strengthening the link between binary stars and bipolar planetary nebulae. On the other end of the stellar age spectrum is L483, a dark nebula which contains the protostar IRAS 18418-0440. Although classified as a class 0 protostar, it has some unusual features for such an object, such as a lack of high-velocity stellar winds, and it has been proposed that this object is in transition between class 0 and class I. A variable nebula exists around the protostar, although it is only visible in infrared light.

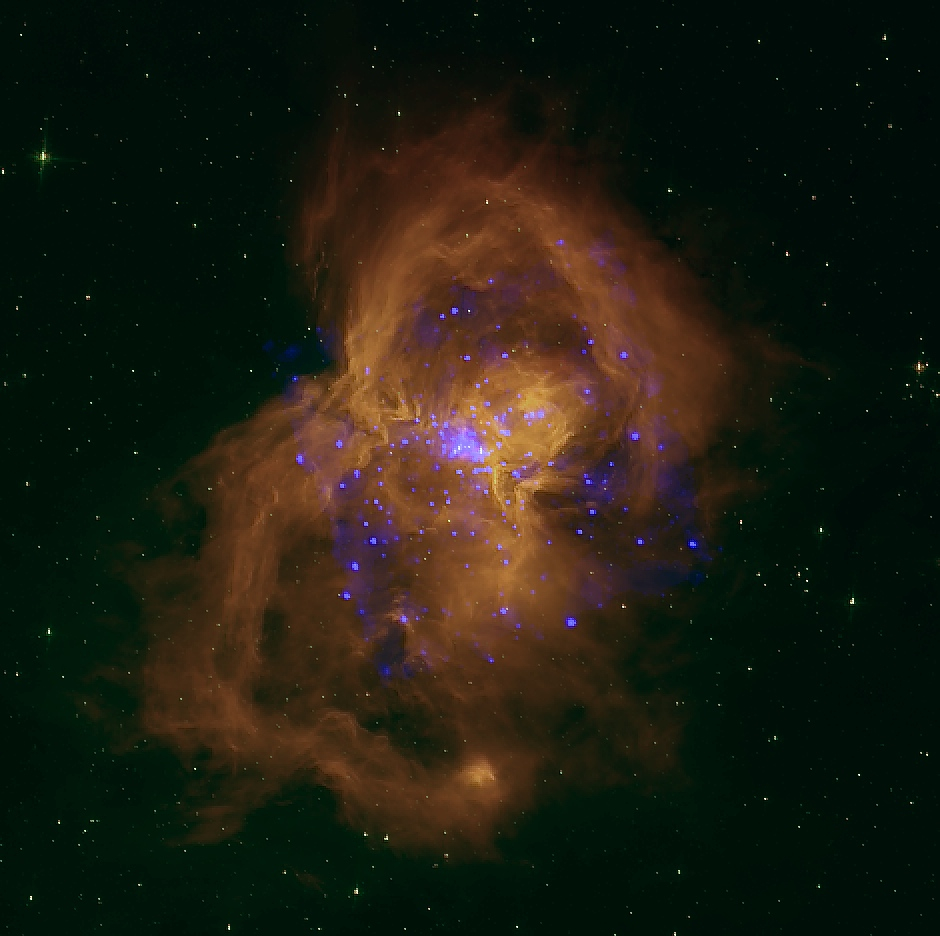
Westerhout 40, one of the nearest sites of massive star formation

The Serpens cloud is a massive star-forming molecular cloud situated in the southern part of Serpens Cauda. Only two million years old and 420 parsecs distant, the cloud is known to contain many protostars such as Serpens FIRS 1 and Serpens SVS 20. The Serpens South protocluster was uncovered by NASA's Spitzer Space Telescope in the southern portion of the cloud, and it appears that star formation is still continuing in the region. Another site of star formation is the Westerhout 40 complex, consisting of a prominent HII region adjacent to a molecular cloud. Located around 500 parsecs distant, it is one of the nearest massive regions of star formation, but as the molecular cloud obscures the HII region, rendering it and its embedded cluster tough to see visibly, it is not as well-studied as others. The embedded cluster likely contains over 600 stars above 0.1 solar masses, with several massive stars, including at least one O-type star, being responsible for lighting the HII region and the production of a bubble.

Despite the presence of the Milky Way, several active galaxies are visible in Serpens Cauda as well, such as PDS 456, found near Xi Serpentis. The most intrinsically luminous nearby active galaxy, this AGN has been found to be extremely variable in the X-ray spectrum. This has allowed light to be shed on the nature of the supermassive black hole at the center, likely a Kerr black hole. It is possible that the quasar is undergoing a transition from an ultraluminous infrared galaxy to a classical radio-quiet quasar, but there are problems with this theory, and the object appears to be an exceptional object that does not completely lie within current classification systems. Nearby is NRAO 530, a blazar that has been known to flare in the X-rays occasionally. One of these flares was for less than 2000 seconds, making it the shortest flare ever observed in a blazar as of 2004. The blazar also appears to show periodic variability in its radio wave output over two different periods of six and ten years.

=== Meteor showers ===
There are two daytime meteor showers that radiate from Serpens, the Omega Serpentids and the Sigma Serpentids. Both showers peak between December 18 and December 25.

== See also ==
- Serpens in Chinese astronomy
