= List of stars in Serpens =

This is the list of notable stars in the constellation Serpens, sorted by decreasing brightness.

Name	B	F	G.	Var	HD	HIP	RA	Dec	vis. mag.	abs. mag.	Dist. (ly)	Sp. class	Notes
α Ser	α	24	21 Cap		140573	77070	15^{h} 44^{m} 16.00^{s}	+06° 25′ 31.9″	2.63	0.87	73	K2III	Unukalhai, Unukalhay, Unuk al Hay, Unuk Elhai, Unuk, Cor Serpentis
η Ser	η	58	34 Cau		168723	89962	18^{h} 21^{m} 18.92^{s}	−02° 53′ 49.6″	3.23	1.84	62	K0III-IV	Donghai, Tung Hae
μ Ser	μ	32	27 Cap		141513	77516	15^{h} 49^{m} 37.27^{s}	−03° 25′ 48.5″	3.54	0.14	156	A0V	Tiānrǔ (天乳)
ξ Ser	ξ	55	8 Cau		159876	86263	17^{h} 37^{m} 35.23^{s}	−15° 23′ 54.3″	3.54	0.99	105	F0IIIp	Nanhai, Nan Hae
β Ser	β	28			141003	77233	15^{h} 46^{m} 11.21^{s}	+15° 25′ 18.9″	3.65	0.29	153	A3V	Zhou
ε Ser	ε	37	29 Cap		141795	77622	15^{h} 50^{m} 48.89^{s}	+04° 28′ 39.3″	3.71	2.04	70	A2m	Ba, Pa, component of the δ Ser system; quadruple star; Delta Scuti-type variable star
γ Ser	γ	41			142860	78072	15^{h} 56^{m} 26.99^{s}	+15° 39′ 53.0″	5.20	3.62	36	F6V	Muning, Ainalhai, Zheng, Ching
κ Ser	κ	35			141477	77450	15^{h} 48^{m} 44.41^{s}	+18° 08′ 30.4″	4.09	−1.05	348	M1III	Gudja
δ Ser A	δ	13			138917	76276	15^{h} 34^{m} 48.19^{s}	+10° 32′ 19.9″	3.80	−0.24	210	F0IV	quadruple star; Delta Scuti-type variable star
ο Ser	ο	56	11 Cau		160613	86565	17^{h} 41^{m} 24.92^{s}	−12° 52′ 30.6″	4.24	0.68	168	A2Va	Delta Scuti-type variable star
ν Ser	ν	53	1 Cau		156928	84880	17^{h} 20^{m} 49.64^{s}	−12° 50′ 48.8″	4.32	0.45	193	A0/A1V	
λ Ser	λ	27	25 Cap		141004	77257	15^{h} 46^{m} 26.75^{s}	+07° 21′ 11.7″	4.42	4.07	38	G0Vvar	
ι Ser	ι	21			140159	76852	15^{h} 41^{m} 33.09^{s}	+19° 40′ 13.8″	4.51	0.66	192	A1V	
ζ Ser	ζ	57	17 Cau		164259	88175	18^{h} 00^{m} 28.92^{s}	−03° 41′ 24.6″	4.62	2.79	76	F3V	
θ^{1} Ser	θ^{1}	63	71 Cau		175638	92946	18^{h} 56^{m} 13.16^{s}	+04° 12′ 12.7″	4.62	1.59	132	A5V	Alya, Alga, Dzaneb al Haiyet, Cauda Serpentis
ρ Ser	ρ	38			141992	77661	15^{h} 51^{m} 15.94^{s}	+20° 58′ 40.4″	4.74	−0.68	395	K5III	
π Ser	π	44			143894	78554	16^{h} 02^{m} 17.69^{s}	+22° 48′ 15.8″	4.82	1.15	177	A3V	
σ Ser	σ	50	49 Cap		147449	80179	16^{h} 22^{m} 04.44^{s}	+01° 01′ 44.1″	4.82	2.64	89	F0V	
θ^{2} Ser	θ^{2}	63	72 Cau		175639	92951	18^{h} 56^{m} 14.61^{s}	+04° 12′ 07.4″	4.98	1.77	143	A5Vn	
5 Ser		5	9 Cap	MQ	136202	74975	15^{h} 19^{m} 18.58^{s}	+01° 46′ 00.0″	5.04	3.08	81	F8III-IV	MQ Ser; BY Draconis variable
b Ser	b	36	30 Cap		141851	77660	15^{h} 51^{m} 15.65^{s}	−03° 05′ 25.5″	5.09	1.65	159	A3Vn	
10 Ser		10	13 Cap		137898	75761	15^{h} 28^{m} 38.29^{s}	+01° 50′ 31.8″	5.15	2.28	122	A8IV	
τ^{1} Ser	τ^{1}	9			137471	75530	15^{h} 25^{m} 47.41^{s}	+15° 25′ 41.0″	5.16	−2.09	918	M1III	
R Ser				R	141850	77615	15^{h} 50^{m} 41.70^{s}	+15° 08′ 01.0″	5.20		930		Mira variable
d Ser	d	59	41 Cau		169985	90441	18^{h} 27^{m} 12.51^{s}	+00° 11′ 46.1″	5.20	−0.63	479	G0III+...	
d Ser B	d	59			169986		18^{h} 27^{m} 12.20^{s}	+00° 11′ 48.0″	5.20				
δ Ser B	δ	13			138918		15^{h} 34^{m} 48.10^{s}	+10° 32′ 21.0″	4.20		210	F0IV	
ω Ser	ω	34	28 Cap		141680	77578	15^{h} 50^{m} 17.53^{s}	+02° 11′ 47.8″	5.21	0.68	263	G8III	has a planet (b)
16 Ser		16			139195	76425	15^{h} 36^{m} 29.55^{s}	+10° 00′ 37.6″	5.26	0.97	235	K0p	
3 Ser		3	2 Cap		135482	74649	15^{h} 15^{m} 11.37^{s}	+04° 56′ 21.7″	5.32	−0.46	467	K0III	
χ Ser	χ	20			140160	76866	15^{h} 41^{m} 47.39^{s}	+12° 50′ 51.1″	5.34	1.11	228	A0p Sr	α^{2} CVn-type variable star
6 Ser		6	11 Cap		136514	75119	15^{h} 21^{m} 02.02^{s}	+00° 42′ 56.1″	5.35	0.98	244	K3III	
c Ser	c	60	45 Cau		170474	90642	18^{h} 29^{m} 40.96^{s}	−01° 59′ 06.8″	5.38	1.08	236	K0III	
A^{2} Ser	A^{2}	25	24 Cap	PT	140873	77227	15^{h} 46^{m} 05.65^{s}	−01° 48′ 14.8″	5.39	−0.10	408	B8III	PT Ser
43 G. Ser Cap			43 Cap		145206	79195	16^{h} 09^{m} 50.53^{s}	−03° 28′ 00.2″	5.39	−0.51	494	K4III	
32 G. Ser Cau			32 Cau		168415	89851	18^{h} 20^{m} 08.77^{s}	−15° 49′ 53.8″	5.39	−0.41	470	K3III	
QY Ser				QY	142574	77902	15^{h} 54^{m} 34.66^{s}	+20° 18′ 39.1″	5.45	−0.88	601	M0III	
A^{1} Ser	A^{1}	11	15 Cap		138562	76133	15^{h} 32^{m} 57.95^{s}	−01° 11′ 10.7″	5.50	0.91	270	K0III	
φ Ser	φ				142980	78132	15^{h} 57^{m} 14.64^{s}	+14° 24′ 51.4″	5.54	1.33	227	K1IV	
6 G. Ser Cau			6 Cau		159358	86019	17^{h} 34^{m} 46.35^{s}	−11° 14′ 31.2″	5.54	0.23	377	B8Vn	
64 Ser		64	74 Cau		175869	93051	18^{h} 57^{m} 16.59^{s}	+02° 32′ 07.4″	5.56	−2.08	1101	B9IIIp...	
22 G. Ser Cap			22 Cap		140775	77163	15^{h} 45^{m} 23.47^{s}	+05° 26′ 50.4″	5.57	0.21	384	A1V	
4 Ser		4	3 Cap		135559	74689	15^{h} 15^{m} 49.14^{s}	+00° 22′ 19.6″	5.62	2.15	161	A4V	
45 Ser	g	45			144874	79007	16^{h} 07^{m} 37.55^{s}	+09° 53′ 30.3″	5.63	1.05	269	A7V	
					136138	74896	15^{h} 18^{m} 24.51^{s}	+20° 34′ 22.1″	5.68	0.93	290	G5IV	
47 Ser		47	39 Cap	FS	145002	79072	16^{h} 08^{m} 28.08^{s}	+08° 32′ 03.6″	5.69	−0.52	568	M3.5IIIa	FS Ser
υ Ser	υ	31			141187	77336	15^{h} 47^{m} 17.35^{s}	+14° 06′ 55.0″	5.71	1.27	252	A3V	
44 G. Ser Cau	(v)		44 Cau		170200	90497	18^{h} 27^{m} 58.77^{s}	+06° 11′ 39.0″	5.71	−1.07	739	B8III-IV	
10 G. Ser Cau			10 Cau		160018	86313	17^{h} 38^{m} 09.51^{s}	−10° 55′ 34.5″	5.74	0.16	425	K0III	
20 G. Ser Cau	l		20 Cau		165438	88684	18^{h} 06^{m} 15.11^{s}	−04° 45′ 04.2″	5.74	3.02	114	K1IV	
e Ser	e		57 Cau		171978	91322	18^{h} 37^{m} 35.95^{s}	−00° 18′ 33.9″	5.76	−0.72	644	A2V	
τ^{7} Ser	τ^{7}	22			140232	76878	15^{h} 41^{m} 54.76^{s}	+18° 27′ 50.0″	5.80	2.17	174	A2m	
3 Her		(3)	34 Cap		143553	78442	16^{h} 00^{m} 51.16^{s}	+04° 25′ 37.8″	5.82	1.49	239	K0III:	
66 G. Ser Cau			66 Cau		173495	92027	18^{h} 45^{m} 28.36^{s}	+05° 30′ 00.4″	5.82	−0.87	709	A1V	
19 G. Ser Cau			19 Cau		165402	88670	18^{h} 06^{m} 07.40^{s}	−08° 19′ 26.1″	5.84	−0.37	570	B8III-IV	
ψ Ser	ψ	23	20 Cap		140538	77052	15^{h} 44^{m} 01.85^{s}	+02° 30′ 55.9″	5.86	5.03	48	G5V	Triple star; solar analog
6 G. Ser Cap			6 Cap		136028	74901	15^{h} 18^{m} 26.13^{s}	−00° 27′ 40.5″	5.88	−1.51	979	K5III	
FL Ser				FL	134943	74386	15^{h} 12^{m} 04.27^{s}	+18° 58′ 33.6″	5.90	−1.13	830	M4III	
τ^{5} Ser	τ^{5}	18			139225	76424	15^{h} 36^{m} 29.20^{s}	+16° 07′ 08.8″	5.93	2.48	160	F3V	
41 G. Ser Cap	t		41 Cap		145085	79120	16^{h} 08^{m} 58.90^{s}	+03° 27′ 16.0″	5.93	0.33	430	K5III	
42 G. Ser Cap			42 Cap		145148	79137	16^{h} 09^{m} 11.06^{s}	+06° 22′ 49.8″	5.93	3.51	99	K1+...	
13 G. Ser Cau			13 Cau		161701	87074	17^{h} 47^{m} 36.79^{s}	−14° 43′ 32.8″	5.93	−0.04	510	B9V	
16 G. Ser Cau			16 Cau		163336	87813	17^{h} 56^{m} 19.04^{s}	−15° 48′ 44.5″	5.93	1.52	249	A0V	
61 Ser	e	61	48 Cau		170920	90844	18^{h} 31^{m} 56.99^{s}	−01° 00′ 10.7″	5.93	−0.28	570	A4III	
9 G. Ser Cau			9 Cau		159877	86266	17^{h} 37^{m} 36.20^{s}	−15° 34′ 15.7″	5.94	−3.63	2672	F0IV	
					141353	77412	15^{h} 48^{m} 13.31^{s}	+13° 47′ 21.6″	5.98	0.33	440	K2III	
28 G. Ser Cau			28 Cau		167768	89587	18^{h} 16^{m} 53.09^{s}	−03° 00′ 24.3″	5.99	0.97	329	G3III	
τ^{6} Ser	τ^{6}	19			140027	76810	15^{h} 40^{m} 59.09^{s}	+16° 01′ 28.7″	6.00	0.30	450	G8III	
					137853	75674	15^{h} 27^{m} 38.87^{s}	+25° 06′ 06.0″	6.01	−0.90	786	M1III	
					139087	76372	15^{h} 35^{m} 53.39^{s}	+11° 15′ 56.5″	6.04	−0.64	706	K0III:	
39 Ser	r	39			142267	77801	15^{h} 53^{m} 12.19^{s}	+13° 11′ 52.8″	6.07	4.86	57	G0IV	
43 Ser	i	43	35 Cap		144046	78685	16^{h} 03^{m} 45.71^{s}	+04° 59′ 12.5″	6.07	0.68	389	G9III	
τ^{3} Ser	τ^{3}	15			139074	76337	15^{h} 35^{m} 33.28^{s}	+17° 39′ 20.1″	6.10	0.58	414	G8III:	
8 Ser		8	12 Cap		137006	75342	15^{h} 23^{m} 43.67^{s}	−01° 01′ 20.3″	6.11	2.41	179	F0V	
NW Ser			35 Cau	NW	168797	89977	18^{h} 21^{m} 28.40^{s}	+05° 26′ 08.7″	6.14	−3.93	3361	B3Ve	Be star
73 G. Ser Cau			73 Cau		175679	92968	18^{h} 56^{m} 25.60^{s}	+02° 28′ 16.3″	6.14	0.11	523	G8III	
τ^{8} Ser	τ^{8}	26			140729	77111	15^{h} 44^{m} 42.15^{s}	+17° 15′ 51.2″	6.15	1.18	321	A0V	
					144889	78985	16^{h} 07^{m} 22.19^{s}	+21° 49′ 21.8″	6.15	−0.05	566	K4III	
37 G. Ser Cau			37 Cau		169493	90253	18^{h} 24^{m} 57.21^{s}	−01° 34′ 45.9″	6.15	0.54	432	F1V	
14 G. Ser Cau	k		14 Cau		162757	87540	17^{h} 53^{m} 03.51^{s}	−10° 53′ 58.2″	6.17	1.56	273	K1III:	
HD 157968		(47)	5 Cau		157968	85397	17^{h} 27^{m} 02.12^{s}	−12° 30′ 44.4″	6.20	2.92	148	F7V	
67 G. Ser Cau			67 Cau		173954	92254	18^{h} 48^{m} 02.67^{s}	+04° 14′ 29.0″	6.20	−0.97	886	K5	
					142357	77835	15^{h} 53^{m} 34.86^{s}	+16° 04′ 30.0″	6.21	1.48	288	F5II-III	
τ^{2} Ser	τ^{2}	12			138527	76069	15^{h} 32^{m} 09.68^{s}	+16° 03′ 22.1″	6.22	0.61	431	B9V	
					139862	76733	15^{h} 40^{m} 10.36^{s}	+12° 03′ 10.6″	6.22	−1.34	1058	G8II	
	p				137510	75535	15^{h} 25^{m} 53.30^{s}	+19° 28′ 50.6″	6.26	3.16	136	G0V	
					142763	77995	15^{h} 55^{m} 39.86^{s}	+18° 37′ 14.8″	6.26	−2.26	1646	B8III	
38 G. Ser Cap			38 Cap		144426	78840	16^{h} 05^{m} 37.93^{s}	+08° 05′ 46.5″	6.27	0.81	402	A3m	
40 Ser		40	32 Cap	FP	142500	77910	15^{h} 54^{m} 40.27^{s}	+08° 34′ 49.2″	6.28	1.94	241	A7Vn	FP Ser; Delta Scuti-type
7 Ser		7			136831	75230	15^{h} 22^{m} 23.24^{s}	+12° 34′ 03.1″	6.29	0.62	445	A0V	
					142244	77782	15^{h} 52^{m} 56.15^{s}	+17° 24′ 11.4″	6.29	0.43	485	K0	
29 G. Ser Cau			29 Cau		167833	89623	18^{h} 17^{m} 24.16^{s}	−09° 45′ 30.5″	6.29	0.69	430	A8V	
					135263	74505	15^{h} 13^{m} 31.84^{s}	+22° 58′ 59.4″	6.31	1.63	282	A2V	
23 G. Ser Cap			23 Cap		140815	77186	15^{h} 45^{m} 39.50^{s}	+00° 53′ 27.8″	6.32	−0.07	619	K0III	
21 G. Ser Cau			21 Cau		165462	88671	18^{h} 06^{m} 07.44^{s}	−00° 26′ 46.0″	6.32	0.36	507	G8IIp	
10 G. Ser Cap			10 Cap		136442	75101	15^{h} 20^{m} 47.17^{s}	−02° 24′ 46.5″	6.34	3.50	120	K0V	
27 G. Ser Cau			27 Cau		167564	89512	18^{h} 15^{m} 57.93^{s}	−03° 37′ 04.7″	6.35	0.55	472	A4V	
					136643	75125	15^{h} 21^{m} 06.90^{s}	+24° 57′ 29.0″	6.36	0.20	555	K0	
12 G. Ser Cau			12 Cau		161023	86769	17^{h} 43^{m} 48.45^{s}	−13° 30′ 30.3″	6.36	3.21	139	F0V	
36 G. Ser Cau			36 Cau		169268	90174	18^{h} 24^{m} 03.60^{s}	−03° 34′ 58.9″	6.36	2.25	216	F6III-IV	
63 G. Ser Cau			63 Cau		172365	91499	18^{h} 39^{m} 36.88^{s}	+05° 15′ 51.4″	6.36	−1.25	1087	F8Ib-II	
					138085	75810	15^{h} 29^{m} 12.14^{s}	+16° 23′ 43.7″	6.38	0.45	499	G8III-IV	
24 G. Ser Cau			24 Cau		166103	88981	18^{h} 09^{m} 43.37^{s}	−13° 56′ 03.9″	6.38	−0.18	669	K1II	
MV Ser			49 Cau	MV	170973	90858	18^{h} 32^{m} 06.88^{s}	+03° 39′ 34.5″	6.41	−1.41	1194	A0sp...	α^{2} CVn-type variable star
45 G. Ser Cap			45 Cap		145936	79522	16^{h} 13^{m} 38.63^{s}	−01° 28′ 30.5″	6.45	1.46	324	K0	
2 G. Ser Cau			2 Cau		156971	84883	17^{h} 20^{m} 52.60^{s}	−10° 41′ 46.9″	6.46	3.09	154	F1III+...	
4 G. Ser Cap			4 Cap		135615	74695	15^{h} 15^{m} 53.57^{s}	+06° 27′ 53.6″	6.47	−1.38	1212	K0	
FQ Ser			40 Cap	FQ	145050	79086	16^{h} 08^{m} 36.53^{s}	+08° 36′ 47.7″	6.47	0.69	468	M4III	
FR Ser	(z)		51 Cau	FR	171586	91142	18^{h} 35^{m} 36.48^{s}	+04° 56′ 09.8″	6.47	1.41	335	A2pvar	α^{2} CVn-type variable star
					140438	76985	15^{h} 43^{m} 10.54^{s}	+13° 40′ 03.9″	6.48	0.05	629	G5III	
4 G. Ser Cau			4 Cau		157969	85405	17^{h} 27^{m} 09.89^{s}	−15° 51′ 12.0″	6.48	0.70	466	K0II/III	
					138803	76198	15^{h} 33^{m} 52.74^{s}	+17° 08′ 14.9″	6.49	2.50	205	F3III	
60 G. Ser Cau			60 Cau		172088	91394	18^{h} 38^{m} 23.80^{s}	−03° 11′ 37.4″	6.49	3.00	163	F9IV	
					135061	74441	15^{h} 12^{m} 47.19^{s}	+10° 42′ 08.9″	6.50	−0.06	669	K2	
5 G. Ser Cap			5 Cap		136027	74895	15^{h} 18^{m} 22.62^{s}	+00° 56′ 22.0″	6.50	0.89	432	K0	
48 G. Ser Cap			48 Cap		146740	79834	16^{h} 17^{m} 43.37^{s}	+01° 29′ 48.2″	6.50	0.18	598	K0	
τ^{4} Ser	τ^{4}	17			139216	76423	15^{h} 36^{m} 28.19^{s}	+15° 06′ 05.0″	6.51	0.50	520	M5II-III	semiregular variable star
14 Ser		14	19 Cap		139137	76427	15^{h} 36^{m} 33.72^{s}	−00° 33′ 41.3″	6.51	0.52	514	G8III+...	
29 Ser		29	45 Cap		141040	77249	15^{h} 46^{m} 24.02^{s}	+15° 31′ 36.1″	6.70	−0.19	780	A3	
46 Ser		46			144937	79047	16^{h} 08^{m} 05.73^{s}	+10° 04′ 49.8″	6.74	1.55	355	A3	
HD 168443					168443	89844	18^{h} 20^{m} 03.93^{s}	−09° 35′ 44.6″	6.92	4.03	124	G5IV	has a planet (b) and a brown dwarf
HD 136118			8 Cap		136118	74948	15^{h} 18^{m} 55.47^{s}	−01° 35′ 32.6″	6.94	3.35	171	F9V	has a brown dwarf companion that was formerly a candidate planet
HD 142245					142245	77783	15^{h} 52^{m} 56^{s}	+15° 25′ 51″	7.63		357	K0	has a planet (b)
HD 168746					168746	90004	18^{h} 21^{m} 49.78^{s}	−11° 55′ 21.7″	7.95	4.78	141	G5V	Alasia, has a planet (b)
HD 175541					175541	92895	18^{h} 55^{m} 40.88^{s}	+04° 15′ 55.2″	8.03	2.49	417	G8IV	Kaveh, has a planet (b)
Gliese 710					168442	89825	18^{h} 19^{m} 50.84^{s}	−01° 56′ 19.0″	9.66	8.26	63	K7V	future encounter at 0.17 ly
AO Ser						AO	15^{h} 58^{m} 18.41^{s}	+17° 16′ 10.0″	11.04	1.88	1,530	A2	Eclipsing binary/Delta Scuti var.
HAT-P-46							18^{h} 01^{m} 47.0^{s}	−02° 58′ 15″	11.94		965		has two transiting planets (b & c)
HAT-P-45							18^{h} 17^{m} 30.0^{s}	−03° 22′ 52″	12.79		995		has two transiting planets (b)
COROT-11							18^{h} 42^{m} 44.95^{s}	+05° 56′ 15.7″	12.94	4.20	~1820	F6V	has a transiting planet (b)
LX Ser							15^{h} 35^{m} 44^{s}	+19° 01′ 30″	13.2				Stepanian's Star; flare star
CoRoT-28							18^{h} 34^{m} 45.0^{s}	+05° 34′ 26″	13.49		1826	G8/9IV	has a transiting planet (b)
CoRoT-9							18^{h} 43^{m} 09.18^{s}	+06° 12′ 14.9″	13.7	5.4	1500	G3V	has a transiting planet (b)
CoRoT-33							18^{h} 38^{m} 34.0^{s}	+05° 37′ 29″	14.7			G9V	has a transiting planet (b)
CoRoT-27							18^{h} 33^{m} 59.0^{s}	+05° 32′ 19″	15.54			G2	has a transiting planet (b)
CoRoT-23							18^{h} 39^{m} 08^{s}	+04° 21′ 28″	15.63			F9/G0V	has a transiting planet (b)
FX Serpentis							18h 06m 50.14s	-09 41 54.0"		14		M8-M9e or C6,2e-C8,3e	More likely a long Carbon star
Table legend: • Name = Proper name • B = Bayer designation • F or/and G. = Flamsteed designation or Gould designation • Var = Variable-star designation • HD = Henry Draper Catalogue designation number • HIP = Hipparcos Catalogue designation number • RA = Right ascension for the Epoch/Equinox J2000.0 • Dec = Declination for the Epoch/Equinox J2000.0 • vis. mag. = visual magnitude (m or m_{v}), also known as apparent magnitude • abs. mag. = absolute magnitude (M_{v}) • Dist. (ly) = Distance in light-years from Earth • Sp. class = Spectral class of the star in the stellar classification system • Notes = Common name(s) or alternate name(s); comments; notable properties [for example: multiple star status, range of variability if it is a variable star, exoplanets, etc.]

== See also ==
- List of stars by constellation
