= Serpens in Chinese astronomy =

The modern constellation Serpens lies across one of the quadrants, symbolized by the Azure Dragon of the East (Chinese: 東方青龍; pinyin: Dōng Fāng Qīng Lóng), and Three Enclosures (三垣; Sān Yuán), that divide the sky in traditional Chinese uranography.

The name of the western constellation in modern Chinese is 巨蛇座 (jù shé zuò), meaning "the huge snake constellation".

== Stars ==
The map of Chinese constellation in constellation Serpens area consists of :

Four Symbols	Mansion (Chinese name)	Romanization	Translation	Asterisms (Chinese name)	Romanization	Translation	Western star name	Proper Name	Chinese star name	Romanization	Translation
Three Enclosures (三垣)	天市垣	Tiān Shì Yuán	Heavenly Market enclosure	天市左垣	Tiānshìzuǒyuán	Left Wall					
Three Enclosures (三垣)	天市垣	Tiān Shì Yuán	Heavenly Market enclosure	天市左垣	Tiānshìzuǒyuán	Left Wall	θ^{1} Ser	Alya (for component A)			
Three Enclosures (三垣)	天市垣	Tiān Shì Yuán	Heavenly Market enclosure	天市左垣	Tiānshìzuǒyuán	Left Wall	θ^{1} Ser	Alya (for component A)	天市左垣七	Tiānshìzuǒyuánqī	7th star
Three Enclosures (三垣)	天市垣	Tiān Shì Yuán	Heavenly Market enclosure	天市左垣	Tiānshìzuǒyuán	Left Wall	θ^{1} Ser	Alya (for component A)	徐	Xú	(Star of) Xu
Three Enclosures (三垣)	天市垣	Tiān Shì Yuán	Heavenly Market enclosure	天市左垣	Tiānshìzuǒyuán	Left Wall	η Ser				
Three Enclosures (三垣)	天市垣	Tiān Shì Yuán	Heavenly Market enclosure	天市左垣	Tiānshìzuǒyuán	Left Wall	η Ser		天市左垣八	Tiānshìzuǒyuánbā	8th star
Three Enclosures (三垣)	天市垣	Tiān Shì Yuán	Heavenly Market enclosure	天市左垣	Tiānshìzuǒyuán	Left Wall	η Ser		東海	Dōnghǎi	(Star of) Donghai
Three Enclosures (三垣)	天市垣	Tiān Shì Yuán	Heavenly Market enclosure	天市左垣	Tiānshìzuǒyuán	Left Wall	ξ Ser				
Three Enclosures (三垣)	天市垣	Tiān Shì Yuán	Heavenly Market enclosure	天市左垣	Tiānshìzuǒyuán	Left Wall	ξ Ser		天市左垣十	Tiānshìzuǒyuánshí	10th star
Three Enclosures (三垣)	天市垣	Tiān Shì Yuán	Heavenly Market enclosure	天市左垣	Tiānshìzuǒyuán	Left Wall	ξ Ser		南海	Nánhǎi	(Star of) Nanhai
Three Enclosures (三垣)	天市垣	Tiān Shì Yuán	Heavenly Market enclosure	天市左垣	Tiānshìzuǒyuán	Left Wall	64 Ser		徐增四	Xúzēngsì	4th additional star of Xu
Three Enclosures (三垣)	天市垣	Tiān Shì Yuán	Heavenly Market enclosure	天市左垣	Tiānshìzuǒyuán	Left Wall	ζ Ser		東海增一	Dōnghǎizēngyī	1st additional star of Donghai
Three Enclosures (三垣)	天市垣	Tiān Shì Yuán	Heavenly Market enclosure	天市左垣	Tiānshìzuǒyuán	Left Wall	59 Ser		東海增二	Dōnghǎizēngèr	2nd additional star of Donghai
Three Enclosures (三垣)	天市垣	Tiān Shì Yuán	Heavenly Market enclosure	天市左垣	Tiānshìzuǒyuán	Left Wall	61 Ser		東海增三	Dōnghǎizēngsān	3rd additional star of Donghai
Three Enclosures (三垣)	天市垣	Tiān Shì Yuán	Heavenly Market enclosure	天市左垣	Tiānshìzuǒyuán	Left Wall	60 Ser		東海增四	Dōnghǎizēngsì	4th additional star of Donghai
Three Enclosures (三垣)	天市垣	Tiān Shì Yuán	Heavenly Market enclosure	天市右垣	Tiānshìyòuyuán	Right Wall					
Three Enclosures (三垣)	天市垣	Tiān Shì Yuán	Heavenly Market enclosure	天市右垣	Tiānshìyòuyuán	Right Wall	γ Ser	Muning			
Three Enclosures (三垣)	天市垣	Tiān Shì Yuán	Heavenly Market enclosure	天市右垣	Tiānshìyòuyuán	Right Wall	γ Ser	Muning	天市右垣四	Tiānshìyòuyuánsì	4th star
Three Enclosures (三垣)	天市垣	Tiān Shì Yuán	Heavenly Market enclosure	天市右垣	Tiānshìyòuyuán	Right Wall	γ Ser	Muning	鄭	Zhèng	(Star of) Zheng
Three Enclosures (三垣)	天市垣	Tiān Shì Yuán	Heavenly Market enclosure	天市右垣	Tiānshìyòuyuán	Right Wall	β Ser	Zhou			
Three Enclosures (三垣)	天市垣	Tiān Shì Yuán	Heavenly Market enclosure	天市右垣	Tiānshìyòuyuán	Right Wall	β Ser	Zhou	天市右垣五	Tiānshìyòuyuánwǔ	5th star
Three Enclosures (三垣)	天市垣	Tiān Shì Yuán	Heavenly Market enclosure	天市右垣	Tiānshìyòuyuán	Right Wall	β Ser	Zhou	周	Zhōu	(Star of) Zhou
Three Enclosures (三垣)	天市垣	Tiān Shì Yuán	Heavenly Market enclosure	天市右垣	Tiānshìyòuyuán	Right Wall	δ Ser				
Three Enclosures (三垣)	天市垣	Tiān Shì Yuán	Heavenly Market enclosure	天市右垣	Tiānshìyòuyuán	Right Wall	δ Ser		天市右垣六	Tiānshìyòuyuánliù	6th star
Three Enclosures (三垣)	天市垣	Tiān Shì Yuán	Heavenly Market enclosure	天市右垣	Tiānshìyòuyuán	Right Wall	δ Ser		秦	Qín	(Star of) Qin
Three Enclosures (三垣)	天市垣	Tiān Shì Yuán	Heavenly Market enclosure	天市右垣	Tiānshìyòuyuán	Right Wall	α Ser	Unukalhai			
Three Enclosures (三垣)	天市垣	Tiān Shì Yuán	Heavenly Market enclosure	天市右垣	Tiānshìyòuyuán	Right Wall	α Ser	Unukalhai	天市右垣七	Tiānshìyòuyuánqī	7th star
Three Enclosures (三垣)	天市垣	Tiān Shì Yuán	Heavenly Market enclosure	天市右垣	Tiānshìyòuyuán	Right Wall	α Ser	Unukalhai	蜀	Shǔ	(Star of) Shu
Three Enclosures (三垣)	天市垣	Tiān Shì Yuán	Heavenly Market enclosure	天市右垣	Tiānshìyòuyuán	Right Wall	α Ser	Unukalhai	鬼宿西南星	Guǐsùxīnánxīng	Star in the southwest of Ghost constellation
Three Enclosures (三垣)	天市垣	Tiān Shì Yuán	Heavenly Market enclosure	天市右垣	Tiānshìyòuyuán	Right Wall	ε Ser				
Three Enclosures (三垣)	天市垣	Tiān Shì Yuán	Heavenly Market enclosure	天市右垣	Tiānshìyòuyuán	Right Wall	ε Ser		天市右垣八	Tiānshìyòuyuánbā	8th star
Three Enclosures (三垣)	天市垣	Tiān Shì Yuán	Heavenly Market enclosure	天市右垣	Tiānshìyòuyuán	Right Wall	ε Ser		巴	Bā	(Star of) Ba
Three Enclosures (三垣)	天市垣	Tiān Shì Yuán	Heavenly Market enclosure	天市右垣	Tiānshìyòuyuán	Right Wall	ε Ser		柳宿西第三星	Liǔsùxīdìsānxīng	3rd big star in the southwest of Willow constellation
Three Enclosures (三垣)	天市垣	Tiān Shì Yuán	Heavenly Market enclosure	天市右垣	Tiānshìyòuyuán	Right Wall	τ^{1} Ser		周增一	Zhōuzēngyī	1st additional star of Zhou
Three Enclosures (三垣)	天市垣	Tiān Shì Yuán	Heavenly Market enclosure	天市右垣	Tiānshìyòuyuán	Right Wall	τ^{4} Ser		周增二	Zhōuzēngèr	2nd additional star of Zhou
Three Enclosures (三垣)	天市垣	Tiān Shì Yuán	Heavenly Market enclosure	天市右垣	Tiānshìyòuyuán	Right Wall	τ^{5} Ser		周增三	Zhōuzēngsān	3rd additional star of Zhou
Three Enclosures (三垣)	天市垣	Tiān Shì Yuán	Heavenly Market enclosure	天市右垣	Tiānshìyòuyuán	Right Wall	τ^{6} Ser		周增四	Zhōuzēngsì	4th additional star of Zhou
Three Enclosures (三垣)	天市垣	Tiān Shì Yuán	Heavenly Market enclosure	天市右垣	Tiānshìyòuyuán	Right Wall	τ^{3} Ser		周增五	Zhōuzēngwǔ	5th additional star of Zhou
Three Enclosures (三垣)	天市垣	Tiān Shì Yuán	Heavenly Market enclosure	天市右垣	Tiānshìyòuyuán	Right Wall	τ^{7} Ser		周增六	Zhōuzēngliù	6th additional star of Zhou
Three Enclosures (三垣)	天市垣	Tiān Shì Yuán	Heavenly Market enclosure	天市右垣	Tiānshìyòuyuán	Right Wall	ι Ser		周增七	Zhōuzēngqī	7th additional star of Zhou
Three Enclosures (三垣)	天市垣	Tiān Shì Yuán	Heavenly Market enclosure	天市右垣	Tiānshìyòuyuán	Right Wall	κ Ser	Gudja	周增八	Zhōuzēngbā	8th additional star of Zhou
Three Enclosures (三垣)	天市垣	Tiān Shì Yuán	Heavenly Market enclosure	天市右垣	Tiānshìyòuyuán	Right Wall	τ^{8} Ser		周增九	Zhōuzēngjiǔ	9th additional star of Zhou
Three Enclosures (三垣)	天市垣	Tiān Shì Yuán	Heavenly Market enclosure	天市右垣	Tiānshìyòuyuán	Right Wall	29 Ser		周增十一	Zhōuzēngshíyī	11th additional star of Zhou
Three Enclosures (三垣)	天市垣	Tiān Shì Yuán	Heavenly Market enclosure	天市右垣	Tiānshìyòuyuán	Right Wall	υ Ser		周增十二	Zhōuzēngshíèr	12th additional star of Zhou
Three Enclosures (三垣)	天市垣	Tiān Shì Yuán	Heavenly Market enclosure	天市右垣	Tiānshìyòuyuán	Right Wall	39 Ser		周增十三	Zhōuzēngshísān	13th additional star of Zhou
Three Enclosures (三垣)	天市垣	Tiān Shì Yuán	Heavenly Market enclosure	天市右垣	Tiānshìyòuyuán	Right Wall	χ Ser		周增十四	Zhōuzēngshísì	14th additional star of Zhou
Three Enclosures (三垣)	天市垣	Tiān Shì Yuán	Heavenly Market enclosure	天市右垣	Tiānshìyòuyuán	Right Wall	HD 141353		周增十六	Zhōuzēngshíliù	16th additional star of Zhou
Three Enclosures (三垣)	天市垣	Tiān Shì Yuán	Heavenly Market enclosure	天市右垣	Tiānshìyòuyuán	Right Wall	16 Ser		秦增二	Qínzēngèr	2nd additional star of Qin
Three Enclosures (三垣)	天市垣	Tiān Shì Yuán	Heavenly Market enclosure	天市右垣	Tiānshìyòuyuán	Right Wall	λ Ser		蜀增一	Shǔzēngyī	1st additional star of Shu
Three Enclosures (三垣)	天市垣	Tiān Shì Yuán	Heavenly Market enclosure	天市右垣	Tiānshìyòuyuán	Right Wall	3 Ser		蜀增二	Shǔzēngèr	2nd additional star of Shu
Three Enclosures (三垣)	天市垣	Tiān Shì Yuán	Heavenly Market enclosure	天市右垣	Tiānshìyòuyuán	Right Wall	HD 140775		蜀增三	Shǔzēngsān	3rd additional star of Shu
Three Enclosures (三垣)	天市垣	Tiān Shì Yuán	Heavenly Market enclosure	天市右垣	Tiānshìyòuyuán	Right Wall	ψ Ser		巴增一	Bāzēngyī	1st additional star of Ba
Three Enclosures (三垣)	天市垣	Tiān Shì Yuán	Heavenly Market enclosure	天市右垣	Tiānshìyòuyuán	Right Wall	ω Ser		巴增二	Bāzēngèr	2nd additional star of Ba
Three Enclosures (三垣)	天市垣	Tiān Shì Yuán	Heavenly Market enclosure	天市右垣	Tiānshìyòuyuán	Right Wall	HD 143553		巴增三	Bāzēngsān	3rd addition star of Ba
Three Enclosures (三垣)	天市垣	Tiān Shì Yuán	Heavenly Market enclosure	天市右垣	Tiānshìyòuyuán	Right Wall	43 Ser		巴增四	Bāzēngsì	4th additional star of Ba
Three Enclosures (三垣)	天市垣	Tiān Shì Yuán	Heavenly Market enclosure	天市右垣	Tiānshìyòuyuán	Right Wall	36 Ser		巴增五	Bāzēngwǔ	5th additional star of Ba
Three Enclosures (三垣)	天市垣	Tiān Shì Yuán	Heavenly Market enclosure	市樓	Shìlóu	Municipal Office					
Three Enclosures (三垣)	天市垣	Tiān Shì Yuán	Heavenly Market enclosure	市樓	Shìlóu	Municipal Office	ο Ser		市樓二	Shìlóuèr	2nd star
Three Enclosures (三垣)	天市垣	Tiān Shì Yuán	Heavenly Market enclosure	市樓	Shìlóu	Municipal Office	ν Ser		市樓四	Shìlóusì	4th star
Three Enclosures (三垣)	天市垣	Tiān Shì Yuán	Heavenly Market enclosure	市樓	Shìlóu	Municipal Office	HD 157968		市樓五	Shìlóuwǔ	5th star
Three Enclosures (三垣)	天市垣	Tiān Shì Yuán	Heavenly Market enclosure	列肆	Lièsì	Jewel Market	σ Ser		列肆一	Lièsìyī	1st star
Three Enclosures (三垣)	天市垣	Tiān Shì Yuán	Heavenly Market enclosure	斗	Dǒu	Dipper for Liquid					
Three Enclosures (三垣)	天市垣	Tiān Shì Yuán	Heavenly Market enclosure	斗	Dǒu	Dipper for Liquid	46 Ser		斗增三	Dǒuzēngsān	3rd additional star
Three Enclosures (三垣)	天市垣	Tiān Shì Yuán	Heavenly Market enclosure	斗	Dǒu	Dipper for Liquid	45 Ser		斗增四	Dǒuzēngsì	4th additional star
Three Enclosures (三垣)	天市垣	Tiān Shì Yuán	Heavenly Market enclosure	斗	Dǒu	Dipper for Liquid	47 Ser		斗增五	Dǒuzēngwǔ	5th additional star
Three Enclosures (三垣)	天市垣	Tiān Shì Yuán	Heavenly Market enclosure	貫索	Guànsuǒ	Coiled Thong					
Three Enclosures (三垣)	天市垣	Tiān Shì Yuán	Heavenly Market enclosure	貫索	Guànsuǒ	Coiled Thong	π Ser		貫索增十二	Guànsuǒzēngshíèr	12th additional star
Three Enclosures (三垣)	天市垣	Tiān Shì Yuán	Heavenly Market enclosure	貫索	Guànsuǒ	Coiled Thong	ρ Ser		貫索增十三	Guànsuǒzēngshísān	13th additional star
Azure Dragon of the East (東方青龍)	氐	Dī	Root	氐	Dī	Root					
Azure Dragon of the East (東方青龍)	氐	Dī	Root	氐	Dī	Root	11 Ser		氐宿增二十一	Dīsùzēngèrshíyī	21st additional star
Azure Dragon of the East (東方青龍)	氐	Dī	Root	氐	Dī	Root	14 Ser		氐宿增二十二	Dīsùzēngèrshíèr	22nd additional star
Azure Dragon of the East (東方青龍)	氐	Dī	Root	氐	Dī	Root	10 Ser		氐宿增二十三	Dīsùzēngèrshísān	23rd additional star
Azure Dragon of the East (東方青龍)	氐	Dī	Root	氐	Dī	Root	5 Ser		氐宿增二十四	Dīsùzēngèrshísì	24th additional star
Azure Dragon of the East (東方青龍)	氐	Dī	Root	氐	Dī	Root	6 Ser		氐宿增二十五	Dīsùzēngèrshíwǔ	25th additional star
Azure Dragon of the East (東方青龍)	氐	Dī	Root	氐	Dī	Root	4 Ser		氐宿增二十六	Dīsùzēngèrshíliù	26th additional star
Azure Dragon of the East (東方青龍)	氐	Dī	Root	天乳	Tiānrǔ	Celestial Milk					
Azure Dragon of the East (東方青龍)	氐	Dī	Root	天乳	Tiānrǔ	Celestial Milk	μ Ser		天乳	Tiānrǔ	(One star of)
Azure Dragon of the East (東方青龍)	氐	Dī	Root	天乳	Tiānrǔ	Celestial Milk	25 Ser		天乳增一	Tiānrǔzēngyī	1st additional star
Azure Dragon of the East (東方青龍)	氐	Dī	Root	天乳	Tiānrǔ	Celestial Milk	36 Ser		天乳增二	Tiānrǔzēngèr	2nd additional star
Azure Dragon of the East (東方青龍)	氐	Dī	Root	天乳	Tiānrǔ	Celestial Milk	30 Ser		天乳增三	Tiānrǔzēngsān	3rd additional star

== See also ==
- Traditional Chinese star names
- Chinese constellations
