= Tau Serpentis =

The Bayer designation Tau Serpentis (τ Ser / τ Serpentis) is shared by a collection of eight stars, τ^{1} Serpentis through τ^{8} Serpentis, in the head of the constellation Serpens. They are distributed within a box of size 40 minutes in right ascension by 3.5° in declination. They are numbered by increasing right ascension:

- Tau^{1} Serpentis, also designated 9 Serpentis or HD 137471.
- Tau^{2} Serpentis, also designated 12 Serpentis or HD 138527.
- Tau^{3} Serpentis, also designated 15 Serpentis or HD 139074.
- Tau^{4} Serpentis, also designated 17 Serpentis or HD 139216.
- Tau^{5} Serpentis, also designated 18 Serpentis or HD 139225.
- Tau^{6} Serpentis, also designated 19 Serpentis or HD 140027.
- Tau^{7} Serpentis, also designated 22 Serpentis or HD 140232.
- Tau^{8} Serpentis, also designated 26 Serpentis or HD 140729.
