= HD 142245 =

Triple star system in the constellation Serpens

Observation data Epoch J2000 Equinox ICRS
- Constellation: Serpens
- Right ascension: 15^{h} 52^{m} 56.28008^{s}
- Declination: +15° 25′ 50.5379″
- Apparent magnitude (V): 7.45

Characteristics
- Evolutionary stage: subgiant
- Spectral type: K0IV+M1

Astrometry
Radial velocity (R_{v})	6.92 km/s
Proper motion (μ)	RA: −57.312 mas/yr Dec.: −21.641 mas/yr
Parallax (π)	10.2374±0.0224 mas
Distance	318.6 ± 0.7 ly (97.7 ± 0.2 pc)
Absolute magnitude (M_{V})	+2.27

Orbit
Primary	HD 142245 A
Name	HD 142245 BC
Semi-major axis (a)	2.5" (237 AU)

Details

HD 142245 A
Mass	1.52±0.05 M_{☉}
Radius	4.8±0.1 R_{☉}
Luminosity	11.4 L_{☉}
Surface gravity (log g)	3.21±0.14 cgs
Temperature	4,838±36 K
Metallicity	0.20±0.02
Age	2.855±0.514 Gyr

HD 142245 BC
Mass	0.56 M_{☉}

Other designations
- BD+15 2925, HD 142245, HIP 77783, TYC 1496-1841-1, 2MASS J15525629+1525507, Gaia DR2 1193193836691820032

Database references
SIMBAD	data

HD 142245 is a hierarchical triple star system about 318 light-years away.

The primary subgiant star HD 142245 A belongs to the spectral class of K0. Its age is much younger than Sun`s at 2.855±0.514 billion years. The primary star is slightly enriched by heavy elements, having 160% of solar abundance.

In 2014, the co-moving binary stellar companion HD 142245 BC was detected. It consists of pair of red dwarf stars with composite spectral class M1, orbiting each other on 4 AU orbit.

No other stellar companions were found at projected separations from 5.48 to 153.34 AU around HD 142245 A.

== Planetary system ==
In 2011 one superjovian planet HD 142245 A b on a mildly eccentric orbit around star HD 142245 A was discovered utilizing the radial velocity method.

The HD 142245 planetary system
Companion (in order from star)	Mass	Semimajor axis (AU)	Orbital period (days)	Eccentricity	Inclination (°)	Radius
HD 142245 A b	≥1.9±0.2 M_{J}	2.77±0.09	1299±48	0.32	—	—
