= 10 Serpentis =

Star in the constellation Serpens

Observation data Epoch J2000 Equinox J2000
- Constellation: Serpens
- Right ascension: 15^{h} 28^{m} 38.23670^{s}
- Declination: +01° 50′ 31.4852″
- Apparent magnitude (V): 5.15

Characteristics
- Evolutionary stage: main sequence
- Spectral type: A6 III or A7 IV
- B−V color index: 0.245±0.005

Astrometry
Radial velocity (R_{v})	−10.2±2.8 km/s
Proper motion (μ)	RA: −85.35 mas/yr Dec.: −34.31 mas/yr
Parallax (π)	25.16±0.31 mas
Distance	130 ± 2 ly (39.7 ± 0.5 pc)
Absolute magnitude (M_{V})	2.15

Details
Mass	1.64 M_{☉}
Radius	1.87 R_{☉}
Luminosity	11.9±0.4 L_{☉}
Surface gravity (log g)	4.24±0.14 cgs
Temperature	7,550 K
Rotational velocity (v sin i)	110 km/s
Age	424 Myr

Other designations
- 10 Ser, BD+02°2965, FK5 3221, HD 137898, HIP 75761, HR 5746, SAO 121020

Database references
SIMBAD	data

10 Serpentis is a single, white-hued star in Serpens Caput, the western section of the equatorial constellation of Serpens. It is faintly visible to the naked eye with an apparent visual magnitude of 5.15. Located around 129 ly (39.7 pc) distant, it is moving closer to the Sun with a heliocentric radial velocity of −10 km/s and will make its closest approach in around 983,000 years at a separation of about 112 ly (34.2 pc).

Abt and Morrell (1995) gave this star a stellar classification of A6 III, matching an evolved red giant star that has used up its core hydrogen. In contrast, Houk and Swift (1999) classed it A7 IV, which is more in line with an evolving subgiant star that is on its way to becoming a giant. It has a high rate of spin with a projected rotational velocity of 115 km/s, giving it an oblate shape with an equatorial bulge that is an estimated 7% larger than the polar radius. The star is about 424 million years old with 1.64 times the mass of the Sun and is radiating 12 times the Sun's luminosity from its photosphere at an effective temperature of roughly 7,872 K.
