= Subgiant =

Type of star larger than main-sequence but smaller than a giant

A subgiant is a star that is brighter than a normal main-sequence star of the same spectral class, but not as bright as giant stars. The term subgiant is applied both to a particular spectral luminosity class and to a stage in the evolution of a star.

== Yerkes luminosity class IV ==
The term subgiant was first used in 1930 for class G and early K stars with absolute magnitudes between +2.5 and +4. These were noted as being part of a continuum of stars between obvious main-sequence stars such as the Sun and obvious giant stars such as Aldebaran, although less numerous than either the main sequence or the giant stars.

The Yerkes spectral classification system is a two-dimensional scheme that uses a letter and number combination to denote the temperature of a star (e.g. A5 or M1) and a Roman numeral to indicate the luminosity relative to other stars of the same temperature. Luminosity class IV stars are the subgiants, located between main-sequence stars (luminosity class V) and red giants (luminosity class III).

Rather than defining absolute features, a typical approach to determining a spectral luminosity class is to compare similar spectra against standard stars. Many line ratios and profiles are sensitive to gravity, and therefore make useful luminosity indicators, but some of the most useful spectral features for each spectral class are:

- O: relative strength of N^{iii} emission and He^{ii} absorption, strong emission is more luminous
- B: Balmer line profiles, and strength of O^{ii} lines
- A: Balmer line profiles, broader wings means less luminous
- F: line strengths of Fe, Ti, and Sr
- G: Sr and Fe line strengths, and wing widths in the Ca, H and K lines
- K: Ca, H, and K line profiles, Sr/Fe line ratios, and MgH and TiO line strengths
- M: strength of the 422.6 nm Ca line and TiO bands

Morgan and Keenan listed examples of stars in luminosity class IV when they established the two-dimensional classification scheme, including:

- B0: γ Cassiopeiae, δ Scorpii,
- B0.5: β Scorpii, ε Persei
- B1: ο Persei, β Cephei
- B2: γ Orionis, π Scorpii, θ Ophiuchi, λ Scorpii, ω Canis Majoris
- B2.5: γ Pegasi, ζ Cassiopeiae, η Lyrae
- B3: ι Herculis, η Aurigae
- B5: τ Herculis, δ Persei, CH Crucis
- A2: β Aurigae, λ Ursae Majoris, β Serpentis, α Ophiuchi
- A3: δ Herculis, β Equulei,
- F2: δ Geminorum, ζ Serpentis
- F5: Procyon, 110 Herculis, η Scorpii
- F6: τ Boötis, θ Boötis, γ Serpentis
- F8: 50 Andromedae, θ Draconis,
- G0: η Boötis, ζ Herculis
- G2: μ^{2} Cancri, β Hydri, 79 Ceti
- G5: μ Herculis, ω Sagittarii, μ Arae
- G8: β Aquilae, δ Pavonis, λ Andromedae
- K0: η Cephei, κ Coronae Borealis, δ Eridani, 55 Cancri A
- K1: γ Cephei, π Hydrae, φ Serpentis, δ Leporis

Later analysis showed that some of these were blended spectra from double stars and some were variable, and the standards have been expanded to many more stars, but many of the original stars are still considered standards of the subgiant luminosity class. O-class stars and stars cooler than K1 are rarely given subgiant luminosity classes.

== Subgiant branch ==
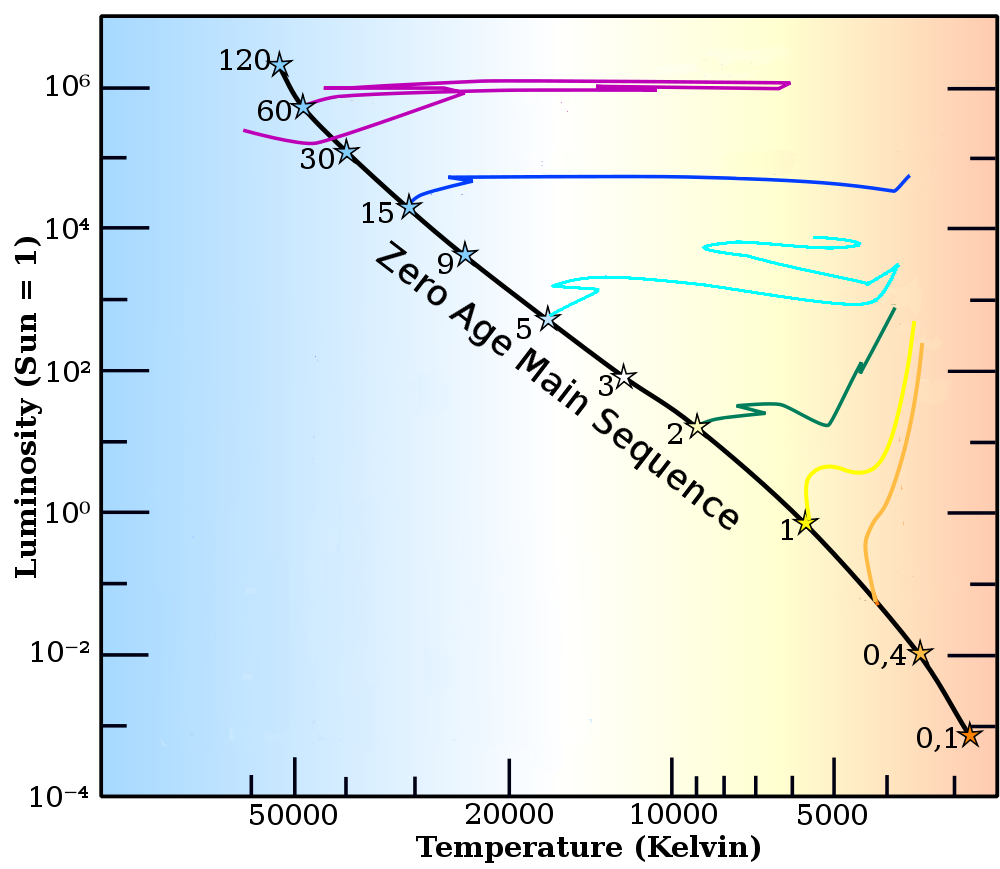
Stellar evolutionary tracks: the 5 M_{☉} track shows a hook and a subgiant branch crossing the Hertzsprung gap; the 2 M_{☉} track shows a hook and pronounced subgiant branch; lower-mass tracks show very short long-lasting subgiant branches

The subgiant branch is a stage in the evolution of low to intermediate mass stars. Stars with a subgiant spectral type are not always on the evolutionary subgiant branch, and vice versa. For example, the stars FK Com and 31 Com both lie in the Hertzsprung Gap and are likely evolutionary subgiants, but both are often assigned giant luminosity classes. The spectral classification can be influenced by metallicity, rotation, unusual chemical peculiarities, etc. The initial stages of the subgiant branch in a star like the sun are prolonged with little external indication of the internal changes. One approach to identifying evolutionary subgiants include chemical abundances such as lithium which is depleted in subgiants, and coronal emission strength.

As the fraction of hydrogen remaining in the core of a main sequence star decreases, the core temperature increases and so the rate of fusion increases. This causes stars to evolve slowly to higher luminosities as they age and broadens the main sequence band in the Hertzsprung–Russell diagram.

Once a main sequence star ceases to fuse hydrogen in its core, the core begins to collapse under its own gravity. This causes it to increase in temperature and hydrogen fuses in a shell outside the core, which provides more energy than core hydrogen burning. Low- and intermediate-mass stars expand and cool until at about 5,000 K they begin to increase in luminosity in a stage known as the red-giant branch. The transition from the main sequence to the red giant branch is known as the subgiant branch. The shape and duration of the subgiant branch varies for stars of different masses, due to differences in the internal configuration of the star.

=== Very-low-mass stars ===
Stars less massive than about 0.4 M_{☉} are convective throughout most of the star. These stars continue to fuse hydrogen in their cores until essentially the entire star has been converted to helium, and they do not develop into subgiants. Stars of this mass have main-sequence lifetimes many times longer than the current age of the Universe.

=== 0.4 to 0.9 ===
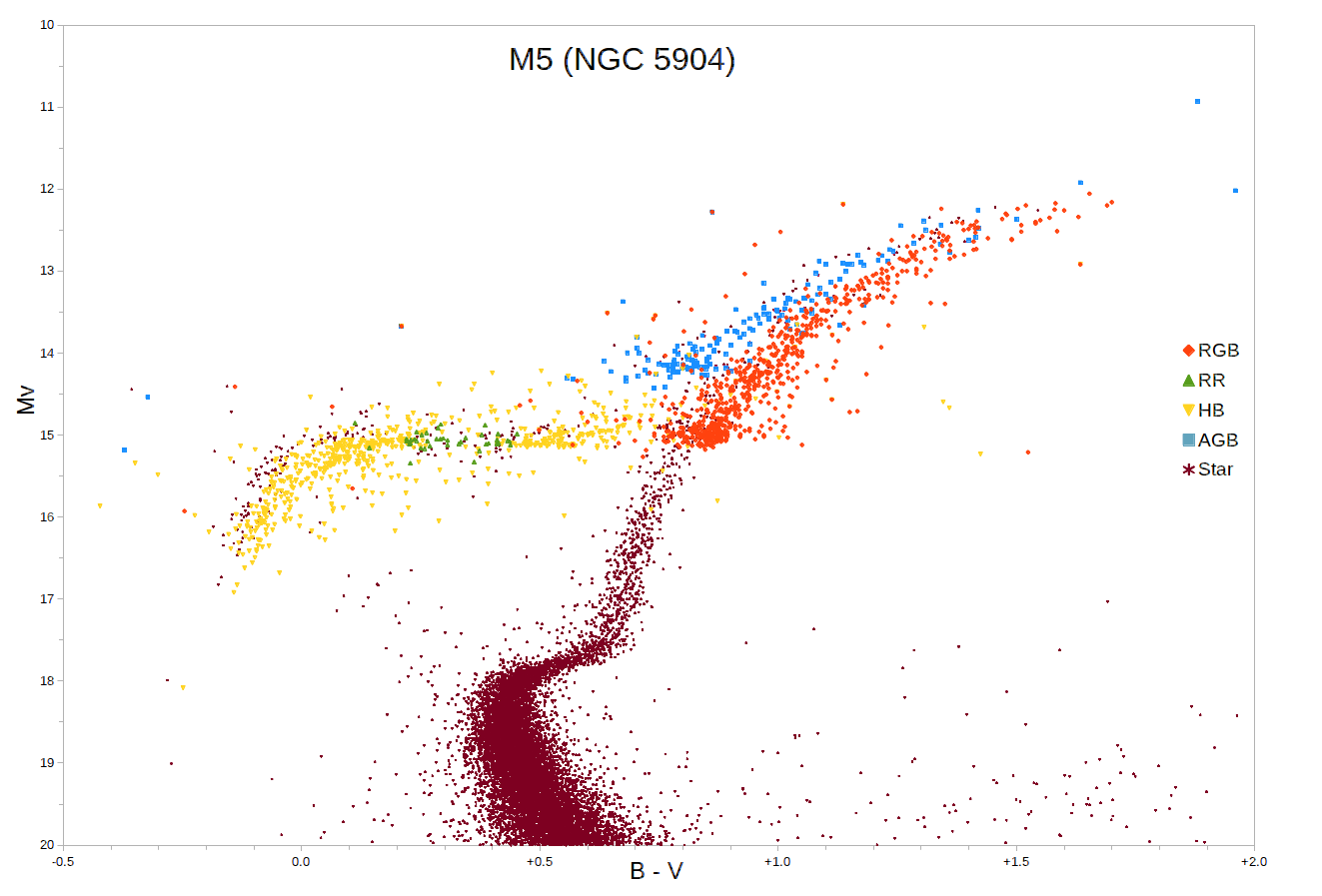
H–R diagram for globular cluster M5, showing a short but densely populated subgiant branch of stars slightly less massive than the Sun

Stars with 40 percent the mass of the Sun and larger have non-convective cores with a strong temperature gradient from the centre outwards. When they exhaust hydrogen at the core of the star, the shell of hydrogen surrounding the central core continues to fuse without interruption. The star is considered to be a subgiant at this point although there is little change visible from the exterior. As the fusing hydrogen shell converts its mass into helium the convective effect separates the helium towards the core, where it very slowly increases the mass of the non-fusing core of nearly pure helium plasma. As this takes place the fusing hydrogen shell gradually expands outward, which increases the size of the outer shell of the star up to the subgiant size from two to ten times the original radius of the star when it was on the main sequence. The expansion of the outer layers of the star into the subgiant size nearly balances the increased energy generated by the hydrogen shell fusion causing the star to nearly maintain its surface temperature. This causes the spectral class of the star to change very little in the lower end of this range of star mass. The subgiant surface area radiating the energy is so much larger that the potential circumstellar habitable zone, where planetary orbits will be in the range to form liquid water, is shifted much further out into any planetary system. The surface area of a sphere is found as 4πr^{2} so a sphere with a radius of 2 R_{☉} will release 4 times as much energy at the surface and a sphere with a 10 R_{☉} will release 100 times as much energy.

The helium core mass is below the Schönberg–Chandrasekhar limit and it remains in thermal equilibrium with the fusing hydrogen shell. Its mass continues to increase and the star very slowly expands as the hydrogen shell migrates outwards. Any increase in energy output from the shell goes into expanding the envelope of the star and the luminosity stays approximately constant. The subgiant branch for these stars is short, horizontal, and heavily populated, as is visible in very old clusters.

After one to eight billion years, the helium core becomes too massive to support its own weight and becomes degenerate. Its temperature increases, the rate of fusion in the hydrogen shell increases, the outer layers become strongly convective, and the luminosity increases at approximately the same effective temperature. The star is now on the Red-giant branch.

=== Mass 1 to 8 ===
Stars as massive and larger than the Sun have a convective core on the main sequence. They develop a more massive helium core, taking up a larger fraction of the star, before they exhaust the hydrogen in the entire convective region. Fusion in the star ceases entirely and the core begins to contract and increase in temperature. The entire star contracts and increases in temperature, with the radiated luminosity actually increasing despite the lack of fusion. This continues for several million years before the core becomes hot enough to ignite hydrogen in a shell, which reverses the temperature and luminosity increase and the star starts to expand and cool. This hook is generally defined as the end of the main sequence and the start of the subgiant branch in these stars.

The core of stars below about 2 M_{☉} is still below the Schönberg–Chandrasekhar limit, but hydrogen shell fusion quickly increases the mass of the core beyond that limit. More-massive stars already have cores above the Schönberg–Chandrasekhar mass when they leave the main sequence. The exact initial mass at which stars will show a hook and at which they will leave the main sequence with cores above the Schönberg–Chandrasekhar limit depend on the metallicity and the degree of overshooting in the convective core. Low metallicity causes the central part of even low mass cores to be convectively unstable, and overshooting causes the core to be larger when hydrogen becomes exhausted.

Once the core exceeds the S–C limit, it can no longer remain in thermal equilibrium with the hydrogen shell. It contracts and the outer layers of the star expand and cool. The energy to expand the outer envelope causes the radiated luminosity to decrease. When the outer layers cool sufficiently, they become opaque and force convection to begin outside the fusing shell. The expansion stops and the radiated luminosity begins to increase, which is defined as the start of the red giant branch for these stars. Stars with an initial mass approximately 1–2 M_{☉} can develop a degenerate helium core before this point and that will cause the star to enter the red giant branch as for lower mass stars.

The core contraction and envelope expansion is very rapid, taking only a few million years. In this time the temperature of the star will cool from its main sequence value of 6,000–30,000 K to around 5,000 K. Relatively few stars are seen in this stage of their evolution and there is an apparent lack in the H–R diagram known as the Hertzsprung gap. It is most obvious in clusters from a few hundred million to a few billion years old.

=== Massive stars ===
Beyond about 8–12 M_{☉}, depending on metallicity, stars have hot massive convective cores on the main sequence due to CNO cycle fusion. Hydrogen shell fusion and subsequent core helium fusion begin soon after core hydrogen exhaustion, before the star could reach the red giant branch. Such stars, for example early B main sequence stars, experience a brief and shortened subgiant branch before becoming supergiants. They may also be assigned a giant spectral luminosity class during this transition.

In very massive O-class main sequence stars, the transition from main sequence to giant to supergiant occurs over a very narrow range of temperature and luminosity, sometimes even before core hydrogen fusion has ended, and the subgiant class is rarely used. Values for the surface gravity, log(g), of O-class stars are around 3.6 cgs for giants and 3.9 for dwarfs. For comparison, typical log(g) values for K class stars are 1.59 (Aldebaran) and 4.37 (α Centauri B), leaving plenty of scope to classify subgiants such as η Cephei with log(g) of 3.47. Examples of massive subgiant stars include θ^{2} Orionis A and the primary star of the δ Circini system, both class O stars with masses of over 20 M_{☉}.

=== Properties ===
This table shows the typical lifetimes on the main sequence (MS) and subgiant branch (SB), as well as any hook duration between core hydrogen exhaustion and the onset of shell burning, for stars with different initial masses, all at solar metallicity (Z = 0.02). Also shown are the helium core mass, surface effective temperature, radius, and luminosity at the start and end of the subgiant branch for each star. The end of the subgiant branch is defined to be when the core becomes degenerate or when the luminosity starts to increase.

Mass (M_{☉})	MS (GYrs)	Hook (MYrs)	SB (MYrs)	Start				End				Example
Mass (M_{☉})	MS (GYrs)	Hook (MYrs)	SB (MYrs)	He Core (M_{☉})	T_{eff} (K)	Radius (R_{☉})	Luminosity (L_{☉})	He Core (M_{☉})	T_{eff} (K)	Radius (R_{☉})	Luminosity (L_{☉})	Example
0.6	58.8	N/A	5,100	0.047	4,763	0.9	0.3	0.10	4,634	1.2	0.6	Lacaille 8760
1.0	9.3	N/A	2,600	0.025	5,766	1.2	1.5	0.13	5,034	2.0	2.2	The Sun
2.0	1.2	10	22	0.240	7,490	3.6	36.6	0.25	5,220	5.4	19.6	Sirius
5.0	0.1	0.4	15	0.806	14,544	6.3	1,571.4	0.83	4,737	43.8	866.0	Alkaid

In general, stars with lower metallicity are smaller and hotter than stars with higher metallicity. For subgiants, this is complicated by different ages and core masses at the main sequence turnoff. Low metallicity stars develop a larger helium core before leaving the main sequence, hence lower mass stars show a hook at the start of the subgiant branch. The helium core mass of a Z=0.001 (extreme population II) 1 M_{☉} star at the end of the main sequence is nearly double that of a Z=0.02 (population I) star. The low metallicity star is also over 1,000 K hotter and over twice as luminous at the start of the subgiant branch. The difference in temperature is less pronounced at the end of the subgiant branch, but the low metallicity star is larger and nearly four times as luminous. Similar differences exist in the evolution of stars with other masses, and key values such as the mass of a star that will become a supergiant instead of reaching the red giant branch are lower at low metallicity.

== Subgiants in the H–R diagram ==
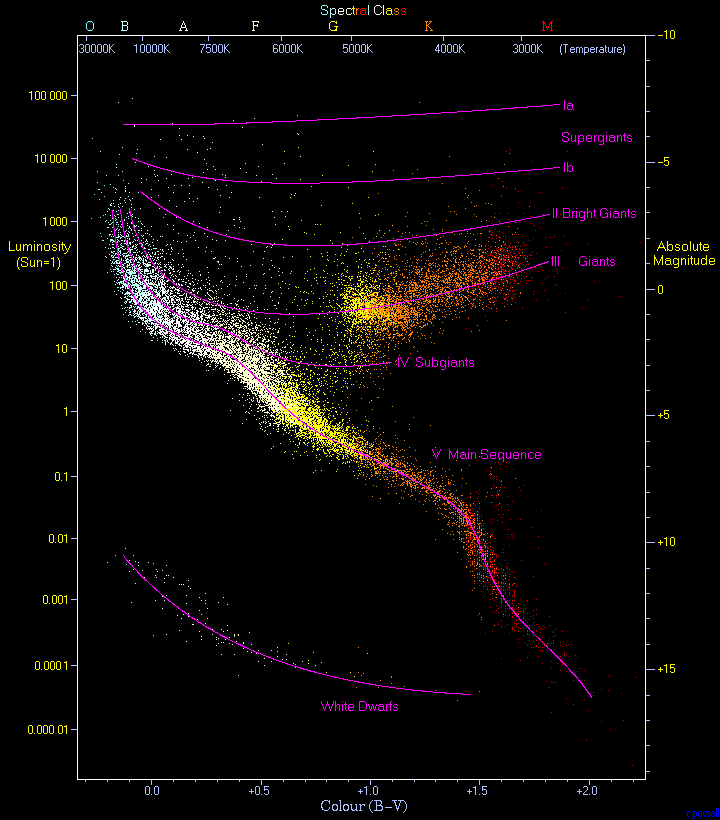
H–R diagram of the entire Hipparcos catalog

A Hertzsprung–Russell (H–R) diagram is a scatter plot of stars with temperature or spectral type on the x-axis and absolute magnitude or luminosity on the y-axis. H–R diagrams of all stars, show a clear diagonal main sequence band containing the majority of stars, a significant number of red giants (and white dwarfs if sufficiently faint stars are observed), with relatively few stars in other parts of the diagram.

Subgiants occupy a region above (i.e. more luminous than) the main sequence stars and below the giant stars. There are relatively few on most H–R diagrams because the time spent as a subgiant is much less than the time spent on the main sequence or as a giant star. Hot, class B, subgiants are barely distinguishable from the main sequence stars, while cooler subgiants fill a relatively large gap between cool main sequence stars and the red giants. Below approximately spectral type K3 the region between the main sequence and red giants is entirely empty, with no subgiants.

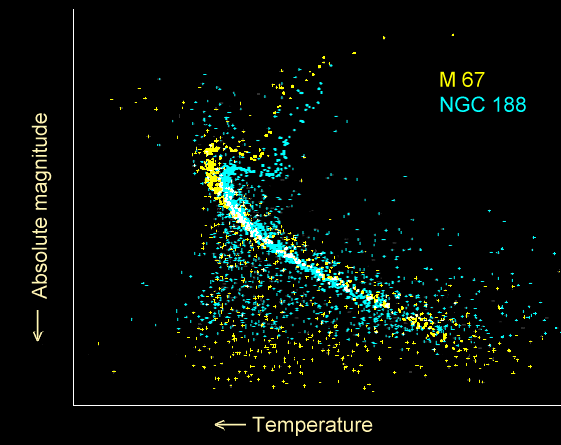
Old open clusters showing a subgiant branch between the main sequence turnoff and the red giant branch, with a hook at the younger M67 turnoff

Stellar evolutionary tracks can be plotted on an H–R diagram. For a particular mass, these trace the position of a star throughout its life, and show a track from the initial main sequence position, along the subgiant branch, to the giant branch. When an H–R diagram is plotted for a group of stars which all have the same age, such as a cluster, the subgiant branch may be visible as a band of stars between the main sequence turnoff point and the red giant branch. The subgiant branch is only visible if the cluster is sufficiently old that 1–8 M_{☉} stars have evolved away from the main sequence, which requires several billion years. Globular clusters such as ω Centauri and old open clusters such as M67 are sufficiently old that they show a pronounced subgiant branch in their color–magnitude diagrams. ω Centauri actually shows several separate subgiant branches for reasons that are still not fully understood, but appear to represent stellar populations of different ages within the cluster.

== Variability ==
Several types of variable star include subgiants:

- Beta Cephei variables, early B main sequence and subgiant stars
- Slowly pulsating B-type stars, mid to late B main sequence and subgiant stars
- Delta Scuti variables, late A and early F main sequence and subgiant stars

Subgiants more massive than the sun cross the Cepheid instability strip, called the first crossing since they may cross the strip again later on a blue loop. In the 2 – 3 M_{☉} range, this includes Delta Scuti variables such as β Cas. At higher masses the stars would pulsate as Classical Cepheid variables while crossing the instability strip, but massive subgiant evolution is very rapid and it is difficult to detect examples. SV Vulpeculae has been proposed as a subgiant on its first crossing but was subsequently determined to be on its second crossing

== Planets ==
Planets in orbit around subgiant stars include Kepler-36 b and c, TOI-4603 b and HD 224693 b.

== Bibliography ==
- Vassiliadis, E.; Wood, P. R. (1993). "Evolution of low- and intermediate-mass stars to the end of the asymptotic giant branch with mass loss". Astrophysical Journal. 413: 641. Bibcode:1993ApJ...413..641V. doi:10.1086/173033.
- Pols, Onno R.; Schröder, Klaus-Peter; Hurley, Jarrod R.; Tout, Christopher A.; Eggleton, Peter P. (1998). "Stellar evolution models for Z = 0.0001 to 0.03". Monthly Notices of the Royal Astronomical Society. 298 (2): 525. Bibcode:1998MNRAS.298..525P. doi:10.1046/j.1365-8711.1998.01658.x.
- Girardi, L.; Bressan, A.; Bertelli, G.; Chiosi, C. (2000). "Evolutionary tracks and isochrones for low- and intermediate-mass stars: From 0.15 to 7 M?, and from Z=0.0004 to 0.03". Astronomy and Astrophysics Supplement Series. 141 (3): 371–383. arXiv:astro-ph/9910164. Bibcode:2000A&AS..141..371G. doi:10.1051/aas:2000126. S2CID 14566232.
