= Phi Serpentis =

Star in the constellation Serpens

Observation data Epoch J2000.0 Equinox J2000.0 (ICRS)
- Constellation: Serpens
- Right ascension: 15^{h} 57^{m} 14.57093^{s}
- Declination: +14° 24′ 52.1359″
- Apparent magnitude (V): +5.55

Characteristics
- Spectral type: K1 IV
- U−B color index: +0.997
- B−V color index: +1.142

Astrometry
Radial velocity (R_{v})	−70.98±0.17 km/s
Proper motion (μ)	RA: −122.48 mas/yr Dec.: +88.16 mas/yr
Parallax (π)	13.52±0.44 mas
Distance	241 ± 8 ly (74 ± 2 pc)
Absolute magnitude (M_{V})	+1.33

Details
Mass	1.19 M_{☉}
Radius	4.2 R_{☉}
Luminosity	41.7 L_{☉}
Surface gravity (log g)	2.65±0.09 cgs
Temperature	4,493±22 K
Metallicity [Fe/H]	0.01±0.05 dex
Rotational velocity (v sin i)	2.0 km/s
Age	3.42 Gyr

Other designations
- φ Ser, BD+14°2969, HD 142980, HIP 78132, HR 5940, SAO 101834

Database references
SIMBAD	data

Phi Serpentis (φ Ser, φ Serpentis) is a solitary star in the Serpens Caput portion of the equatorial constellation Serpens. Based upon an annual parallax shift of 13.52 mas as seen from Earth, it is located about 241 light years distant. The star is faintly visible to the naked eye with an apparent visual magnitude of +5.55.

At the estimated age of 3.42 billion years, this is an evolved K-type subgiant star with a stellar classification of K1 IV. It has about 1.19 times the mass of the Sun and around 4.2 times the Sun's radius. The star radiates 41.7 times the solar luminosity from its photosphere at an effective temperature of 4,493 K.
