= HD 171978 =

Binary star system in the constellation Serpens

Observation data Epoch J2000.0 Equinox J2000.0 (ICRS)
- Constellation: Serpens
- Right ascension: 18^{h} 37^{m} 35.9626^{s}
- Declination: −00° 18′ 34.100″
- Apparent magnitude (V): 6.33±0.10 (A); 6.73±0.10 (B); 5.74 to 5.86 (AB)

Characteristics
- Spectral type: A0V
- U−B color index: +0.06
- B−V color index: +0.067±0.010
- R−I color index: +0.04
- Variable type: suspected

Astrometry
Radial velocity (R_{v})	+11.415±0.031 km/s
Proper motion (μ)	RA: +14.018 mas/yr Dec.: −20.710 mas/yr
Parallax (π)	6.0774±0.0833 mas
Distance	537 ± 7 ly (165 ± 2 pc)
Absolute magnitude (M_{V})	0.30±0.15 (A); 0.70±0.15 (B)

Orbit
Period (P)	14.684636±0.000029 d
Eccentricity (e)	0.2495±0.0011
Periastron epoch (T)	2,454,405.073±0.011
Argument of periastron (ω) (secondary)	230.90±0.30°
Semi-amplitude (K_{1}) (primary)	37.918±0.050 km/s
Semi-amplitude (K_{2}) (secondary)	38.569±0.076 km/s

Details

A
Mass	2.5 M_{☉}
Radius	3.4±0.3 R_{☉}
Luminosity	60.5±8.5 L_{☉}
Rotational velocity (v sin i)	5.6±1.0 km/s

B
Mass	2.35 M_{☉}
Radius	2.8±0.2 R_{☉}
Luminosity	41.9±5.9 L_{☉}
Rotational velocity (v sin i)	5.9±1.0 km/s

Other designations
- e Ser, NSV 11122, BD−00°3521, FK5 3480, GC 25456, HD 171978, HIP 91322, HR 6993, SAO 142444, PPM 180381

Database references
SIMBAD	data

HD 171978 is a binary star system in the Serpens Cauda segment of the equatorial constellation of Serpens. It may be referred to by its Bright Star Catalogue identifier of HR 6993. This system is dimly visible to the naked eye with a combined apparent visual magnitude of 5.76, although is a suspected variable star of unknown type with a magnitude that has been reported to vary between 5.74 and 5.86. HD 171978 is located at a distance of approximately 537 light-years from the Sun based on parallax, and is drifting further away with a barycentric radial velocity of +11.4 km/s. It is a member of the Ursa Major Moving Group.

The binary nature of this system was reported by Canadian astronomer R. M. Petrie in 1948. It is a double-lined spectroscopic binary with an orbital period of 14.7 days and an eccentricity (ovalness) of 0.25. The orbital inclination is estimated to be ~30°. The two stars have a magnitude difference of 0.4±0.1 mag, which gives respective magnitudes of 6.33 and 6.73. They each show a sharp-lined spectra, indicating their rotation rates are not high. Both are similar A-type main-sequence stars with a combined stellar classification of A0V. In 1970, Geary and Abt noted that the secondary appeared to be an Am star.
