= AO Serpentis =

Star in the constellation Serpens

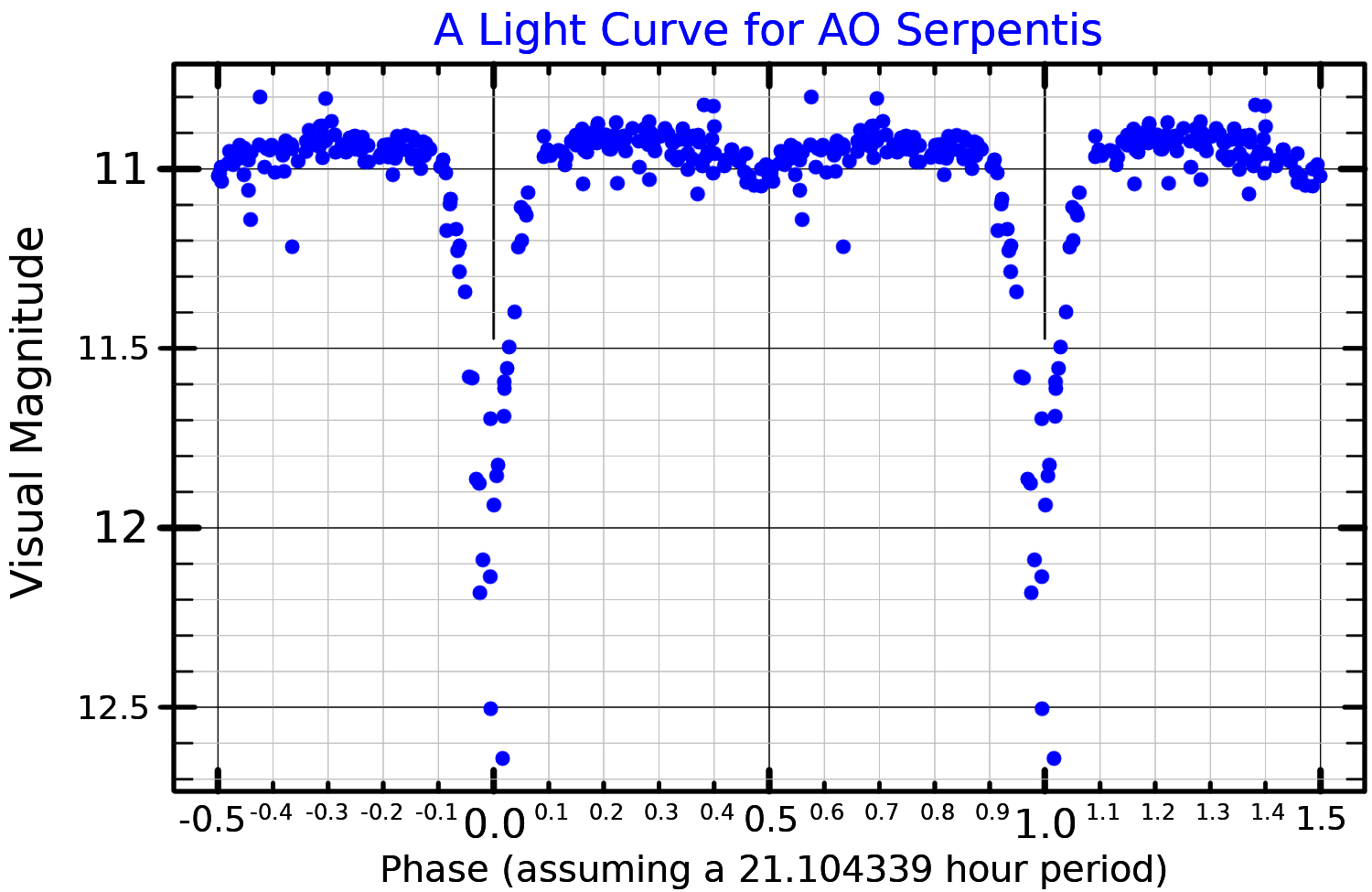
- A visual band light curve for AO Serpentis, plotted from ASAS-SN data

Observation data Epoch J2000 Equinox ICRS
- Constellation: Serpens
- Right ascension: 15^{h} 58^{m} 18.410^{s}
- Declination: +17° 16′ 10.00″
- Apparent magnitude (V): 11.04±0.09

Characteristics
- Evolutionary stage: main sequence
- Spectral type: A2
- B−V color index: 0.22
- Variable type: β Per + δ Sct

Astrometry

Primary
Proper motion (μ)	RA: −8.236 mas/yr Dec.: −10.444 mas/yr
Parallax (π)	2.2539±0.0229 mas
Distance	1,450 ± 10 ly (444 ± 5 pc)
Absolute magnitude (M_{V})	+1.88±0.03

Secondary
Absolute magnitude (M_{V})	+5.17±0.05

Orbit
Period (P)	0.8793496±0.0000047 d
Semi-major axis (a)	5.59±0.05 R_{☉}
Inclination (i)	90.0±1.5°
Longitude of the node (Ω)	3.645±0.002°
Periastron epoch (T)	2,457,127.5076±0.0041 HJD
Semi-amplitude (K_{1}) (primary)	51.6±1.1 km/s
Semi-amplitude (K_{2}) (secondary)	270.3±3.6 km/s

Details

Primary
Mass	2.55±0.09 M_{☉}
Radius	1.64±0.02 R_{☉}
Luminosity	14.45+0.69 −0.65 L_{☉}
Surface gravity (log g)	4.42±0.01 cgs
Temperature	8,820±62 K
Rotational velocity (v sin i)	90±18 km/s

Secondary
Mass	0.49±0.02 M_{☉}
Radius	1.38±0.02 R_{☉}
Luminosity	0.93+0.05 −0.04 L_{☉}
Surface gravity (log g)	3.85±0.01 cgs
Temperature	4,786±11 K

Other designations
- AO Ser, BD+17°2942, TYC 1496-3-1, GSC 01496-00003, 2MASS J15581840+1716101

Database references
SIMBAD	data

AO Serpentis is an eclipsing binary star system in the Serpens Caput segment of the constellation Serpens. It is invisible to the naked eye with a typical apparent visual magnitude of 11.04. Variable star observers record a peak magnitude of 10.7, dropping to 12.0 during the primary eclipse and 10.8 from the secondary eclipse. The distance to this system is approximately 1,450 light years based on parallax measurements.

This system was discovered by C. Hoffmeister to be an Algol-type eclipsing binary in 1935. The following year, P. Guthnick and R. Prager reported a brightness variation between 10.5 and 12.0. In 2004, S. -L. Kim and associates determined that one of the components of this system is pulsating with a short period.

This is a semi-detached binary star system with the secondary component completely filling its Roche lobe while the primary is 61% full. It has an orbital period of 21.1 hours and a semimajor axis of just 5.6 times the radius of the Sun. The orbital plane is inclined by an angle of 90° to the line of sight, causing the secondary component to be completely eclipsed once per orbit. The orbital period shows long-term cyclic variations, changing by up to 0.0051 days every 17.32 years. This may be due to magnetic activity cycles or the influence of a third body. The orbital period as a whole is steadily decreasing at the rate of (−5.39±0.03)×10^{−7} days yr^{−1} due to loss of mass and angular momentum by the system.

The physical properties of the stellar components can be explained by a mass transfer. At some point in the past, mass flowed from the (at the time) more massive and evolved secondary component. This has left the primary as an A-type main-sequence star while the secondary is less massive but overly large. The hotter primary component is a Delta Scuti variable that is undergoing radial pulsation with a dominant frequency of 21.852 days^{−1} and a secondary frequency of 23.484 days^{−1}.
