= 60 Serpentis =

Star in the constellation Serpens

Observation data Epoch J2000 Equinox ICRS
- Constellation: Serpens
- Right ascension: 18^{h} 29^{m} 40.97948^{s}
- Declination: −01° 59′ 07.1058″
- Apparent magnitude (V): 5.38

Characteristics
- Evolutionary stage: red clump
- Spectral type: K0 III
- B−V color index: 0.961±0.004

Astrometry
Radial velocity (R_{v})	+28.36±0.34 km/s
Proper motion (μ)	RA: −85.35 mas/yr Dec.: −34.31 mas/yr
Parallax (π)	25.16±0.31 mas
Distance	130 ± 2 ly (39.7 ± 0.5 pc)
Absolute magnitude (M_{V})	1.25±0.07

Details
Mass	1.81±0.49 M_{☉}
Radius	8 R_{☉}
Luminosity	35 L_{☉}
Surface gravity (log g)	2.92±0.11 cgs
Temperature	5,059±92 K
Metallicity [Fe/H]	−0.08 dex
Rotational velocity (v sin i)	3.9 km/s
Age	1.26+0.19 −0.16 Gyr

Other designations
- c Ser, 60 Ser, BD−02°4641, FK5 1480, HD 170474, HIP 90642, HR 6935, SAO 142348

Database references
SIMBAD	data

60 Serpentis, also known as c Serpentis, is a single, orange-hued star in Serpens Cauda, the eastern section of the constellation Serpens. It is faintly visible to the naked eye with an apparent visual magnitude of 5.38. The distance to this star, as estimated from its annual parallax shift of 25.16±0.31 mas, is approximately 130 light years. It is moving further from the Sun with a heliocentric radial velocity of +28 km/s, having approached as close as 107 ly (32.7 pc) some 1.9 million years ago.

This is an evolved K-type giant star with a stellar classification of K0 III, having used up its core hydrogen and expanded. At the age of around 1.26 billion years, it currently belongs to the so-called "red clump", which indicates it is on the horizontal branch and is generating energy through helium fusion at its core. The star has an estimated 1.8 times the mass of the Sun and 8 times the Sun's radius. It is radiating 35 times the Sun's luminosity from its enlarged photosphere at an effective temperature of about 5,059 K.
