= Pi Serpentis =

Solitary, white-hued star in the constellation Serpens

- Location of π Serpentis (circled in red)

Observation data Epoch J2000.0 Equinox J2000.0 (ICRS)
- Constellation: Serpens
- Right ascension: 16^{h} 02^{m} 17.69166^{s}
- Declination: +22° 48′ 16.0302″
- Apparent magnitude (V): 4.82

Characteristics
- Evolutionary stage: main sequence
- Spectral type: A3 V
- U−B color index: +0.10
- B−V color index: +0.06

Astrometry
Radial velocity (R_{v})	−28.2±4.2 km/s
Proper motion (μ)	RA: +4.03 mas/yr Dec.: +23.60 mas/yr
Parallax (π)	18.22±0.26 mas
Distance	179 ± 3 ly (54.9 ± 0.8 pc)
Absolute magnitude (M_{V})	+1.12

Details
Mass	2.50 M_{☉}
Radius	2.27 R_{☉}
Luminosity	27 L_{☉}
Surface gravity (log g)	4.040 cgs
Temperature	7,566±12 K
Metallicity [Fe/H]	0.380 dex
Rotational velocity (v sin i)	128 km/s
Age	320 Myr

Other designations
- π Ser, 44 Serpentis, BD+23°2886, FK5 3268, HD 143894, HIP 78554, HR 5972, SAO 84155

Database references
SIMBAD	data

Pi Serpentis, Latinized from π Serpentis, is a solitary white-hued star in the constellation Serpens, located in its head, Serpens Caput. Based upon an annual parallax shift of 18.22 mas as seen from Earth, it is located around 179 light years from the Sun. It is visible to the naked eye with an apparent visual magnitude of 4.82.

This is an A-type main sequence star with a stellar classification of A3 V. It is about 320 million years old with a high rate of spin, measured at a 128 km/s projected rotational velocity. The star has an estimated 2.50 times the mass of the Sun and 2.27 times the Sun's radius. It is radiating 27 times the solar luminosity from its photosphere at an effective temperature of 7,566 K.

In 1992, an infrared excess was detected from this system at a wavelength of 60μm. The data suggests a dusty debris disk with a temperature of 45 K is orbiting 211 AU from the host star.
