= Upsilon Serpentis =

Star in the constellation Serpens

Observation data Epoch J2000.0 Equinox J2000.0 (ICRS)
- Constellation: Serpens
- Right ascension: 15^{h} 47^{m} 17.31882^{s}
- Declination: +14° 06′ 55.2617″
- Apparent magnitude (V): +5.70

Characteristics
- Evolutionary stage: main sequence
- Spectral type: A3 V
- U−B color index: +0.09
- B−V color index: +0.10

Astrometry
Radial velocity (R_{v})	−34.2±2.9 km/s
Proper motion (μ)	RA: −55.49 mas/yr Dec.: +32.42 mas/yr
Parallax (π)	13.04±0.84 mas
Distance	250 ± 20 ly (77 ± 5 pc)
Absolute magnitude (M_{V})	+1.30

Details
Mass	2.9±0.23 M_{☉}
Radius	2.2 R_{☉}
Luminosity	23 L_{☉}
Surface gravity (log g)	4.0±0.14 cgs
Temperature	8,917±303 K
Rotational velocity (v sin i)	133 km/s
Age	403+70 −75 Myr

Other designations
- υ Ser, 31 Serpentis, BD+14°2939, HD 141187, HIP 77336, HR 5870, SAO 101739

Database references
SIMBAD	data

Upsilon Serpentis, Latinized from υ Serpentis, is a star in the Serpens Caput section of the constellation Serpens. Based upon an annual parallax shift of 13.04 mas as seen from Earth, it is located around 250 light years from the Sun. The star is bright enough to be faintly visible to the naked eye, having an apparent visual magnitude of +5.70. It is a member of the Hyades group, a stream of stars that share a similar trajectory to the Hyades cluster.

This is an A-type main sequence star with a stellar classification of A3 V. It has an estimated 2.9 times the mass of the Sun and around 2.2 times the Sun's radius. With an age of 403 million years, it has a high rate of spin with a projected rotational velocity of 133 km/s. It is radiating 23 times the solar luminosity from its photosphere at an effective temperature of 8,917 K.

Upsilon Serpentis is a suspected astrometric binary, which means an undetected companion is perturbing the motion of the visible star. An X-ray emission has been detected from this system with a luminosity of 247.8×10^{20} W. This may be coming from the companion, since A-type stars are not expected to emit X-rays.
