= 6 Serpentis =

Star in the constellation Serpens

Observation data Epoch J2000 Equinox ICRS
- Constellation: Serpens
- Right ascension: 15^{h} 21^{m} 01.99609^{s}
- Declination: +00° 42′ 55.2213″
- Apparent magnitude (V): 5.382 (5.54 + 9.42)

Characteristics
- Spectral type: K3 III
- B−V color index: 1.224

Astrometry
Radial velocity (R_{v})	+9.7±0.3 km/s
Proper motion (μ)	RA: −42.36 mas/yr Dec.: −103.14 mas/yr
Parallax (π)	13.63±0.73 mas
Distance	240 ± 10 ly (73 ± 4 pc)
Absolute magnitude (M_{V})	1.03

Details

6 Ser A
Mass	1.27 M_{☉}
Radius	12 R_{☉}
Luminosity	55 L_{☉}
Surface gravity (log g)	2.4 cgs
Temperature	4,417±17 K
Metallicity [Fe/H]	−0.02 dex
Rotational velocity (v sin i)	2.4 km/s
Age	6.03 Gyr

Other designations
- 6 Ser, BD+01°3067, HD 136514, HIP 75119, HR 5710, SAO 120955, ADS 9596, WDS J15210+0043

Database references
SIMBAD	data

6 Serpentis is a binary star system in the constellation Serpens. It has a combined apparent visual magnitude of 5.382, which is bright enough to be faintly visible to the naked eye. The distance to this system, based upon an annual parallax shift of 13.63±0.73 mas, is about 240 light years. It is moving further from the Sun with a heliocentric radial velocity of +10 km/s.

The primary, component A, is an evolved red giant of spectral type K3III, a star that has used up its core hydrogen and has expanded. At the age of around six billion years it is a red clump star, indicating it is on the horizontal branch and is generating energy through helium fusion at its core. The star has 1.27 times the mass of the Sun and has expanded to 12 times the Sun's radius. It is radiating 55 times the Sun's luminosity from its enlarged photosphere at an effective temperature of 4,417 K.

As of 2005, the magnitude 9.42 secondary, component B, was at an angular separation of 3.329″±0.017″ along a position angle of 21.8°±0.3°.
