= Omega Serpentis =

Star in the constellation Serpens

- Location of ω Serpentis (circled in red)

Observation data Epoch J2000.0 Equinox J2000.0 (ICRS)
- Constellation: Serpens
- Right ascension: 15^{h} 50^{m} 17.54635^{s}
- Declination: +02° 11′ 47.4362″
- Apparent magnitude (V): +5.22

Characteristics
- Evolutionary stage: red clump
- Spectral type: G8 III
- U−B color index: +0.805
- B−V color index: +1.02

Astrometry
| Radial velocity (R_{v}) | −3.11±0.08 km/s |
| Proper motion (μ) | RA: +29.15 mas/yr Dec.: −47.31 mas/yr |
| Parallax (π) | 11.93±0.28 mas |
| Distance | 273 ± 6 ly (84 ± 2 pc) |
| Absolute magnitude (M_{V}) | +0.49 |

Details
| Mass | 1.20±0.24 M_{☉} |
| Radius | 10.48±0.52 R_{☉} |
| Luminosity | 69 L_{☉} |
| Surface gravity (log g) | 2.88±0.03 cgs |
| Temperature | 4,797±16 K |
| Metallicity [Fe/H] | −0.26±0.02 dex |
| Rotational velocity (v sin i) | 0.99±0.98 km/s |
| Age | 3.94±2.16 Gyr |

Other designations
- ω Ser, 34 Ser, BD+02°3007, HD 141680, HIP 77578, HR 5888, SAO 121215

Database references
| SIMBAD | data |
| Exoplanet Archive | data |

Omega Serpentis (ω Ser, ω Serpentis) is a solitary star within the Serpens Caput part of the equatorial constellation of Serpens. It is visible to the naked eye with an apparent visual magnitude of +5.22. Based upon an annual parallax shift of 11.93 mas as seen from Earth, it is located about 273 light years from the Sun. At that distance, its visual magnitude is diminished by an extinction factor of 0.19 due to interstellar dust. It is a member of the Ursa Major Stream, lying among the outer parts, or corona, of this moving group of stars that roughly follow a common heading through space.

With an estimated age of around four billion years, Omega Serpentis is an evolved G-type giant star with a stellar classification of G8 III. It is a red clump giant, which means that it is generating energy at its core through the nuclear fusion of helium. The star has an estimated 120% of the Sun's mass but has expanded to 10.48 times the radius of the Sun. It is radiating 69 times the solar luminosity from its photosphere at an effective temperature of 4,797 K.

== Planetary system ==
Observations made between 2001 and 2003 by the Okayama Planet Search Program showed that Omega Serpentis is undergoing periodic radial velocity variations with a preliminary period estimate of 312.3 days. Following this announcement in 2005, further observations were performed that were best explained by a planet following a Keplerian orbit, resulting in confirmation of planet existence in 2013. This companion has an estimated orbital period of 277 days, a semimajor axis of 1.1 AU, and an eccentricity of 0.1.

Since the inclination of the orbit is unknown, only a lower bound on the mass of the planet can be determined. The object has at least 170% the mass of Jupiter. However, these values for the semimajor axis and planetary mass are based on an adopted stellar mass of 2.17 times the mass of the Sun. More recent results by Jofré et al. (2015) give a lower stellar mass estimate of 1.20 solar masses.

The Omega Serpentis planetary system
| Companion (in order from star) | Mass | Semimajor axis (AU) | Orbital period (days) | Eccentricity | Inclination (°) | Radius |
|---|---|---|---|---|---|---|
| b | ≥0.736+0.060 −0.106 M_{J} | 0.838+0.002 −0.001 | 278.59+0.80 −0.61 | 0.180+0.066 −0.127 | — | — |
