= 3 Serpentis =

Star in the constellation Serpens

- Location of 3 Serpentis (circled)

Observation data Epoch J2000 Equinox ICRS
- Constellation: Serpens
- Right ascension: 15^{h} 15^{m} 11.3569^{s}
- Declination: +04° 56′ 21.680″
- Apparent magnitude (V): 5.337

Characteristics
- Spectral type: K0III

Astrometry
Proper motion (μ)	RA: −17.768±0.264 mas/yr Dec.: 4.496±0.225 mas/yr
Parallax (π)	6.3077±0.2396 mas
Distance	520 ± 20 ly (159 ± 6 pc)
Absolute magnitude (M_{V})	+1.15

Orbit
Period (P)	66±5 yr
Semi-major axis (a)	229±2″
Eccentricity (e)	0.962±0.005
Inclination (i)	132±4°

Details
Surface gravity (log g)	+2.77 cgs
Temperature	4,550 K
Metallicity [Fe/H]	+0.03 dex
Rotational velocity (v sin i)	1.5 km/s

Other designations
- 3 Ser, BD+05°2985, FK5 562, HD 135482, HIP 74649, HR 5675, SAO 120916

Database references
SIMBAD	data

3 Serpentis is a binary star in the constellation Serpens with an orbital period of approximately 66 years. It is dimly visible to the naked eye with an apparent magnitude of 5.337. Located around 114 parsecs (370 ly) distant, it is an orange giant of spectral type K0III, a star that has used up its core hydrogen.

The two components of 3 Serpentis can be resolved using speckle interferometry and were separated by 0.23" in 2014. The orbit is highly eccentric and at periastron passage in 1997, the two are calculated to have been only 6 mas apart.

Individual spectra for the two components of 3 Serpentis cannot be obtained and the spectral type of K0III is for the two stars combined. The primary is 2.5 magnitudes brighter than the secondary and cooler. The combined spectral type indicates that the primary is likely to have evolved away from the main sequence, but comparison of the colour and brightness of the secondary suggest it is still a main sequence star.
