= 16 Serpentis =

Binary star system in the constellation Serpens

Observation data Epoch J2000.0 Equinox ICRS
- Constellation: Serpens
- Right ascension: 15^{h} 36^{m} 29.57498^{s}
- Declination: +10° 00′ 36.5574″
- Apparent magnitude (V): 5.261

Characteristics
- Spectral type: K0III: CN1 Ba0.7 Sr2
- U−B color index: +0.66
- B−V color index: +0.937

Astrometry
Radial velocity (R_{v})	+2.94±0.13 km/s
Proper motion (μ)	RA: 41.881 mas/yr Dec.: −125.722 mas/yr
Parallax (π)	14.3226±0.1100 mas
Distance	228 ± 2 ly (69.8 ± 0.5 pc)

Orbit
Period (P)	5,324±19 d
Eccentricity (e)	0.345±0.024
Periastron epoch (T)	44,090±53
Argument of periastron (ω) (secondary)	358±4°
Semi-amplitude (K_{1}) (primary)	3.86±0.09 km/s

Details

16 Ser A
Mass	1.70 M_{☉}
Radius	8 R_{☉}
Luminosity	42.7 L_{☉}
Surface gravity (log g)	2.64±0.12 cgs
Temperature	4,946±51 K
Metallicity [Fe/H]	−0.13±0.06 dex
Rotational velocity (v sin i)	1.4 km/s
Age	2.40 Gyr

Other designations
- 16 Ser, BD+10°2884, FK5 3226, GC 20981, HD 139195, HIP 76425, HR 5802, SAO 101640

Database references
SIMBAD	data

16 Serpentis is a binary star system in the Serpens Caput portion of the equatorial constellation of Serpens, located 228 light years from the Sun. It is visible to the naked eye as a fain, orange-hued star with an apparent visual magnitude of 5.261. The system is moving further from the Earth with a heliocentric radial velocity of +3 km/s.

The variable radial velocity of this star was discovered at Lick Observatory and was announced by J. H. Moore in 1924. It is a single-lined spectroscopic binary with an orbital period of 14.58 years and an eccentricity of 0.345. The visible component is an evolved giant star with a stellar classification of K0III: CN1 Ba0.7 Sr2. This is a mild barium star with the suffix notation above indicating associated abundance anomalies. The companion is a presumed white dwarf star that has already passed through its giant stage, during which time it enhanced the envelope of the companion with s-process elements. The pair form one of the widest barium star binaries known, which may account for the mildness of the barium anomaly.
