= Nu Serpentis =

A-type main sequence star in the constellation Serpens

- Location of ν Serpentis (circled)

Observation data Epoch J2000 Equinox ICRS
- Constellation: Serpens
- Right ascension: 17^{h} 20^{m} 49.66149^{s}
- Declination: −12° 50′ 48.7533″
- Apparent magnitude (V): 4.32

Characteristics
- Spectral type: A2V
- U−B color index: +0.04
- B−V color index: +0.03

Astrometry
Radial velocity (R_{v})	+4.80 km/s
Proper motion (μ)	RA: +43.40 mas/yr Dec.: +2.61 mas/yr
Parallax (π)	16.05±0.26 mas
Distance	203 ± 3 ly (62 ± 1 pc)
Absolute magnitude (M_{V})	0.35

Details
Mass	2.64 M_{☉}
Radius	3.0 R_{☉}
Luminosity	76 L_{☉}
Surface gravity (log g)	3.95 cgs
Temperature	9,120 K
Metallicity [Fe/H]	0.00 dex
Rotational velocity (v sin i)	123 km/s
Age	350 Myr

Other designations
- ν Ser, 53 Serpentis, BD−12°4722, FK5 3376, GC 23424, HD 156928, HIP 84880, HR 6446, SAO 160479, ADS 10481, CCDM J17208-1251A, WDS J17208-1251A, GSC 05653-01431

Database references
SIMBAD	data

ν Serpentis, Latinized as Nu Serpentis, is a solitary star in the Serpens Cauda section of the equatorial constellation of Serpens. It is a white-hued star that is faintly visible to the naked eye with an apparent visual magnitude of 4.32. Based upon an annual parallax shift of 16.05 mas as seen from the Sun, it is about 203 light years from the Sun. The star is drifting further away with a radial velocity of +5 km/s.

This is an A-type main-sequence star with a stellar classification of A2V, and is generating energy through hydrogen fusion at its core. It is 350 million years old with a high rate of spin, showing a projected rotational velocity of 123 km/s. The star has 2.64 times the mass of the Sun and 3.0 times the Sun's radius. It is radiating 76 times the Sun's luminosity from its photosphere at an effective temperature of 9,120 K. Nu Serpentis has an optical companion, a magnitude +9.4 star at an angular separation of 46 arcseconds.
