= Iota Serpentis =

Star in the constellation Serpens

- Location of ι Serpentis (circled)

Observation data Epoch J2000 Equinox ICRS
- Constellation: Serpens
- Right ascension: 15^{h} 41^{m} 33.05469^{s}
- Declination: +19° 40′ 13.4380″
- Apparent magnitude (V): 4.51

Characteristics
- Evolutionary stage: main sequence
- Spectral type: B9V + A1V
- B−V color index: +0.062±0.003

Astrometry
Radial velocity (R_{v})	−17.20 km/s
Proper motion (μ)	RA: −60.86 mas/yr Dec.: −43.69 mas/yr
Parallax (π)	17.16±0.67 mas
Distance	190 ± 7 ly (58 ± 2 pc)
Absolute magnitude (M_{V})	+0.69

Orbit
Period (P)	8015.0±6.3 d
Semi-major axis (a)	0.21033±0.00047″
Eccentricity (e)	0.0941±0.0028
Inclination (i)	83.608±0.043°
Longitude of the node (Ω)	69.684±0.033°
Periastron epoch (T)	54,180±33 HMJD
Argument of periastron (ω) (secondary)	80.5±1.8°

Details

A
Mass	1.999 M_{☉}

B
Mass	1.984 M_{☉}

Other designations
- ι Ser, 21 Serpentis, BD+20°3138, GC 21102, HD 140159, HIP 76852, HR 5842, SAO 101682, ADS 9744, CCDM J15416+1940

Database references
SIMBAD	data

ι Serpentis, Latinized as Iota Serpentis and abbreviated Iot Ser, is a triple star system in the constellation Serpens, in its head (Serpens Caput). It is approximately 190 light years from Earth.

At the centre of the system is a spectroscopic binary, Iota Serpentis A and B. These are both white main sequence dwarfs and both have apparent magnitudes of +5.3. This binary has an orbital period variously reported as 11 or 22 years. First discovered as an astrometric binary, the pair have now been resolved and visual orbits have been derived.

There are two visual companions, Iota Serpentis C, a 13th magnitude star 143 arcseconds away and Iota Serpentis D, a 12th magnitude star 151 arcseconds distant.
