= 36 Serpentis =

Star in the constellation Serpens

Observation data Epoch J2000.0 Equinox ICRS
- Constellation: Serpens
- Right ascension: 15^{h} 51^{m} 15.59418^{s}
- Declination: −03° 05′ 25.7938″
- Apparent magnitude (V): 5.09 (5.2 + 7.8)

Characteristics
- Spectral type: A3Vn or A2IV-Vn (A7 + G0)
- U−B color index: +0.07
- B−V color index: +0.12

Astrometry
Radial velocity (R_{v})	−8 km/s
Proper motion (μ)	RA: −91.09 mas/yr Dec.: −28.21 mas/yr
Parallax (π)	20.10±0.33 mas
Distance	162 ± 3 ly (49.8 ± 0.8 pc)
Absolute magnitude (M_{V})	1.61

Orbit
Primary	36 Ser A
Name	36 Ser B
Period (P)	1,073 days
Eccentricity (e)	0.7
Semi-amplitude (K_{1}) (primary)	6 km/s

Orbit
Primary	36 Ser AB
Name	36 Ser C
Period (P)	50.6±1.5 yr
Semi-major axis (a)	0.400±0.006″
Eccentricity (e)	0.8323±0.0047
Inclination (i)	98.08±0.31°
Longitude of the node (Ω)	74.00±0.31°
Periastron epoch (T)	2002.78±0.17
Argument of periastron (ω) (secondary)	72.84±0.91°

Details

36 Ser A
Mass	1.97 M_{☉}
Radius	2.25 R_{☉}
Luminosity	19.13 L_{☉}
Surface gravity (log g)	3.89 cgs
Temperature	8,213 K
Metallicity [Fe/H]	−2.00 dex
Rotational velocity (v sin i)	229 km/s
Age	710 Myr

36 Ser B
Mass	≥0.37 and ≤0.50 M_{☉}

36 Ser C
Mass	1.27 M_{☉}
Radius	1.26 R_{☉}
Temperature	6,255 K
Age	710 Myr

Other designations
- b Ser, 36 Ser, BD−02°4058, FK5 2249, GC 4210, HD 141851, HIP 77660, HR 5895, SAO 140801, WDS J15513-0305

Database references
SIMBAD	data

36 Serpentis is a triple star system in the equatorial constellation of Serpens. It has the Bayer designation b Serpentis, while 36 Serpentis is the Flamsteed designation. The system is visible to the naked eye as a dim, white-hued point of light with a combined apparent visual magnitude of 5.09. It is located 162 light years away from the Sun based on parallax, and is moving closer with a radial velocity of −8 km/s.

== Characteristics ==
The system consists of two spectroscopic binaries. The inner pair contains components A and B, while the outer pair contains components AB and C. The age of the whole system is estimated at 710 million years.

The components AB and C orbit each other over a long orbital period of 52.8 years and a high eccentricity of 0.83. Gray et al. (2017) found a merged stellar classification of A2IV-Vn for this system, while Cowley et al. matched it with a class of A3Vn, where the 'n' indicates "nebulous" lines caused by rapid rotation.

The primary component, 36 Serpentis A, is an A7-class main sequence star of visual magnitude 5.2. It is spinning rapidly, showing a projected rotational velocity of 229 km/s. It was once thought to be a Lambda Boötis star but this is now disputed. The star is 710 million years old with 1.97 times the mass of the Sun and 2.25 times the Sun's radius. It is radiating 19 times the Sun's luminosity from its photosphere at an effective temperature of 8,213 K.

The secondary, 36 Serpentis B, has been detected only by spectroscopy. It has an orbital period of 1,073 days (2.94 years) and a high eccentricity of 0.7. Interferometric observations have failed to detect this star, implying a luminosity-derived mass less than 0.50 M_{☉}. The radial velocity data suggest a mass of at least 0.37 solar masses. It may be a faint red dwarf or a white dwarf. 36 Ser B is likely the source for the X-ray emission that has been detected coming from this system.

The tertiary, 36 Serpentis C, is a G0 star with a visual magnitude of 7.8. It has 1.27 times the Sun's mass, 1.26 times the Sun's radius, and an effective temperature of 6,555 K.
