= Sigma Serpentis =

Star in the constellation Serpens

σ Serpentis
- Location of σ Serpentis (circled in red)

Observation data Epoch J2000 Equinox ICRS
- Constellation: Serpens
- Right ascension: 16^{h} 22^{m} 04.34822^{s}
- Declination: +01° 01′ 44.5566″
- Apparent magnitude (V): +4.82

Characteristics
- Evolutionary stage: main sequence
- Spectral type: F3 V
- U−B color index: +0.025
- B−V color index: +0.338

Astrometry
Radial velocity (R_{v})	−49.3±0.9 km/s
Proper motion (μ)	RA: −158.172 mas/yr Dec.: +50.612 mas/yr
Parallax (π)	35.5388±0.1366 mas
Distance	91.8 ± 0.4 ly (28.1 ± 0.1 pc)
Absolute magnitude (M_{V})	+2.63

Details
Mass	1.54 M_{☉}
Radius	1.81 R_{☉}
Luminosity	7.2 L_{☉}
Surface gravity (log g)	4.11 cgs
Temperature	7,009 K
Metallicity [Fe/H]	−0.01 dex
Rotational velocity (v sin i)	77.7 km/s
Age	1.15±0.10 Gyr

Other designations
- σ Ser, 50 Serpentis, BD+01°3215, FK5 1427, HD 147449, HIP 80179, HR 6093, SAO 121540

Database references
SIMBAD	data

Sigma Serpentis, Latinized from σ Serpentis, is a star in the equatorial constellation Serpens. It is faintly visible to the naked eye with an apparent visual magnitude of +4.82. Based upon an annual parallax shift of 35.54 mas as seen from Earth, it is located 92 light-years from the Sun. The star is moving closer to the Sun with a radial velocity of −49 km/s.

Barry (1970) assigned this star a stellar classification of F3 V, indicating an ordinary F-type main-sequence star. It is about one billion years old and is spinning with a projected rotational velocity of 77.7 km/s. The star has an estimated 1.5 times the mass of the Sun and is radiating 7.2 times the Sun's luminosity from its photosphere at an effective temperature of 7,009 K.

A candidate red dwarf companion star, of spectral type M2V, was identified in 2012 by Kevin Luhman and collaborators. It is 43″ from the primary, corresponding to a projected separation of 1200 AU. Gaia DR3 astrometry confirms a similar parallax and proper motion.
