= Rho Serpentis =

Star in the constellation Serpens

- Location of ρ Serpentis (circled in red)

Observation data Epoch J2000 Equinox ICRS
- Constellation: Serpens
- Right ascension: 15^{h} 51^{m} 15.90985^{s}
- Declination: +20° 58′ 40.5166″
- Apparent magnitude (V): 4.78

Characteristics
- Spectral type: K4.5III
- U−B color index: +1.88
- B−V color index: +1.54

Astrometry
Radial velocity (R_{v})	−61.96 km/s
Proper motion (μ)	RA: −53.32 mas/yr Dec.: +18.87 mas/yr
Parallax (π)	8.70±0.30 mas
Distance	370 ± 10 ly (115 ± 4 pc)
Absolute magnitude (M_{V})	−0.56

Details
Mass	1.0 M_{☉}
Radius	44.79±0.57 R_{☉}
Luminosity	491.9±22.3 L_{☉}
Surface gravity (log g)	1.68 cgs
Temperature	3,930+50 −20 K
Metallicity [Fe/H]	−0.08 dex

Other designations
- ρ Ser, 38 Serpentis, NSV 7300, BD+21°2829, GC 21311, HD 141992, HIP 77661, HR 5899, SAO 84037

Database references
SIMBAD	data

Rho Serpentis, Latinized from ρ Serpentis, is a single star in the Caput section of the equatorial constellation Serpens. It has an orange hue and is faintly visible to the naked eye with an apparent visual magnitude of +4.78. The distance to this star is approximately 375 light years based on parallax, but it is drifting closer to the Sun with a radial velocity of −62 km/s.

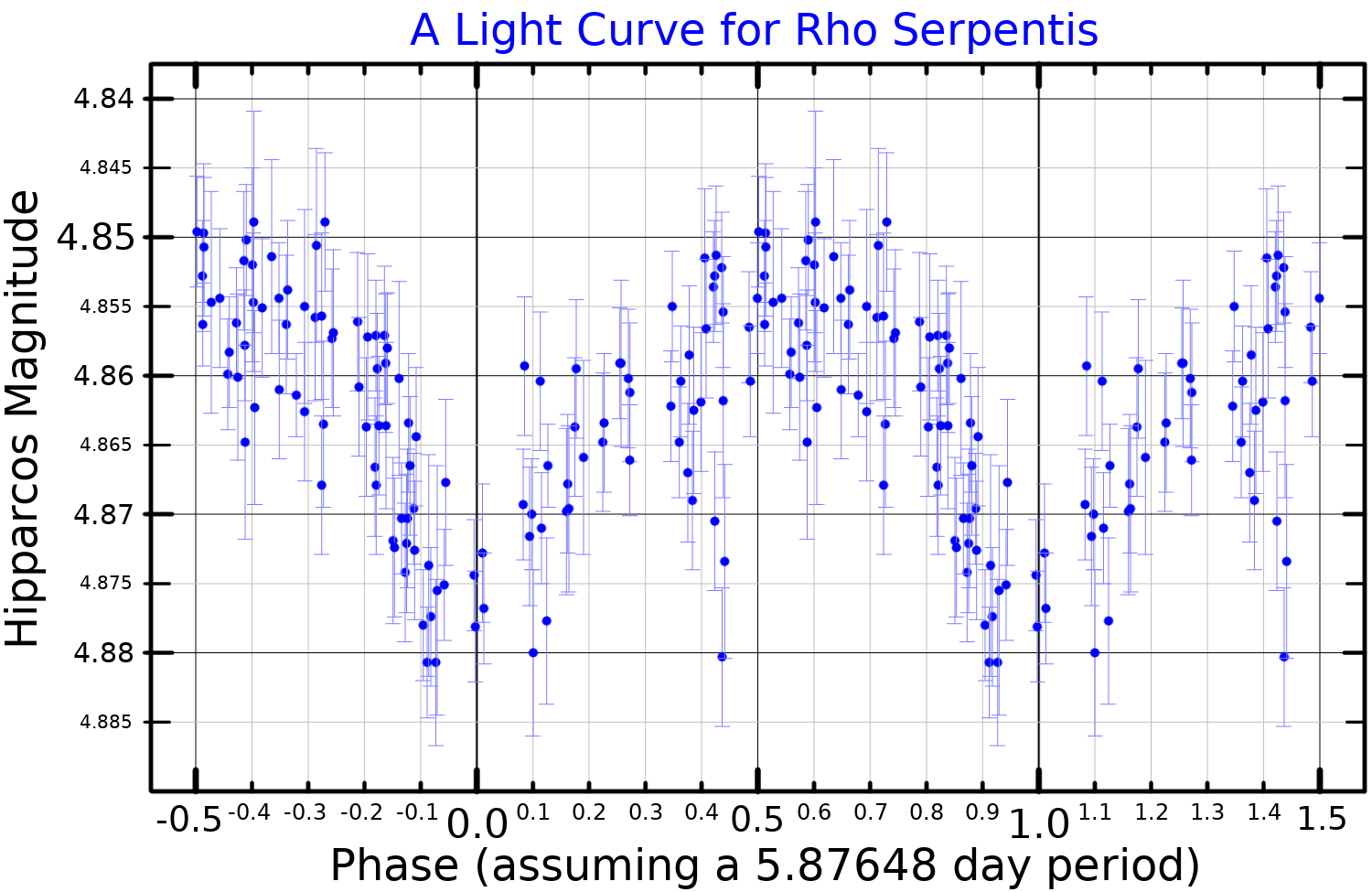
A light curve for Rho Serpentis, plotted from Hipparcos data

This is an aging giant star with a stellar classification of K4.5III. It is a suspected variable star of unknown type, with an I-band brightness ranging from 3.29 down to 3.44 magnitude. Hipparcos photometry revealed a microvariability with a frequency of 0.17017 cycles per day and an amplitude of 0.0080. With the supply of hydrogen exhausted at its core, this solar-mass star has expanded and now has 44.79 times the Sun's radius. The star is radiating 492 times the luminosity of the Sun from its swollen photosphere at an effective temperature of 3,930 K.
