= Tau2 Serpentis =

Star in the constellation Serpens

τ^{2} Serpentis
Observation data Epoch J2000.0 Equinox J2000.0 (ICRS)
- Constellation: Serpens
- Right ascension: 15^{h} 32^{m} 09.67495^{s}
- Declination: +16° 03′ 22.2056″
- Apparent magnitude (V): 6.22

Characteristics
- Evolutionary stage: main sequence
- Spectral type: B9V
- U−B color index: −0.23
- B−V color index: −0.038±0.005

Astrometry
Radial velocity (R_{v})	−19.3±2.7 km/s
Proper motion (μ)	RA: −2.92 mas/yr Dec.: +6.48 mas/yr
Parallax (π)	6.7936±0.0928 mas
Distance	480 ± 7 ly (147 ± 2 pc)
Absolute magnitude (M_{V})	+0.44

Details
Mass	2.82 M_{☉}
Radius	2.70 R_{☉}
Luminosity	91 L_{☉}
Surface gravity (log g)	4.02 cgs
Temperature	10,839 K
Rotational velocity (v sin i)	154 km/s
Age	278 Myr

Other designations
- τ^{2} Ser, 12 Serpentis, BD+16°2797, GC 20880, HD 138527, HIP 76069, HR 5770, SAO 101600, PPM 131484

Database references
SIMBAD	data

Tau^{2} Serpentis, Latinized from τ^{2} Serpentis, is a star in the constellation of Serpens, located approximately 480 light-years from the Sun. It is a challenge to view with the naked eye, having an apparent visual magnitude of 6.22. The star is drifting closer with a radial velocity of −19 km/s.

This object is a late B-type main-sequence star with a stellar classification of B9V. It is a probable Lambda Boötis star. The star is 278 million years old and is spinning with a projected rotational velocity of 154 km/s. It has nearly three times the mass and radius of the Sun. Tau^{2} Serpentis is radiating 91 times the Sun's luminosity from its photosphere at an effective temperature of 10,839 K.

There is evidence of a possible companion, which is contributing about 15% to the total emission of the system.
