= Chi Serpentis =

Star in the constellation Serpens

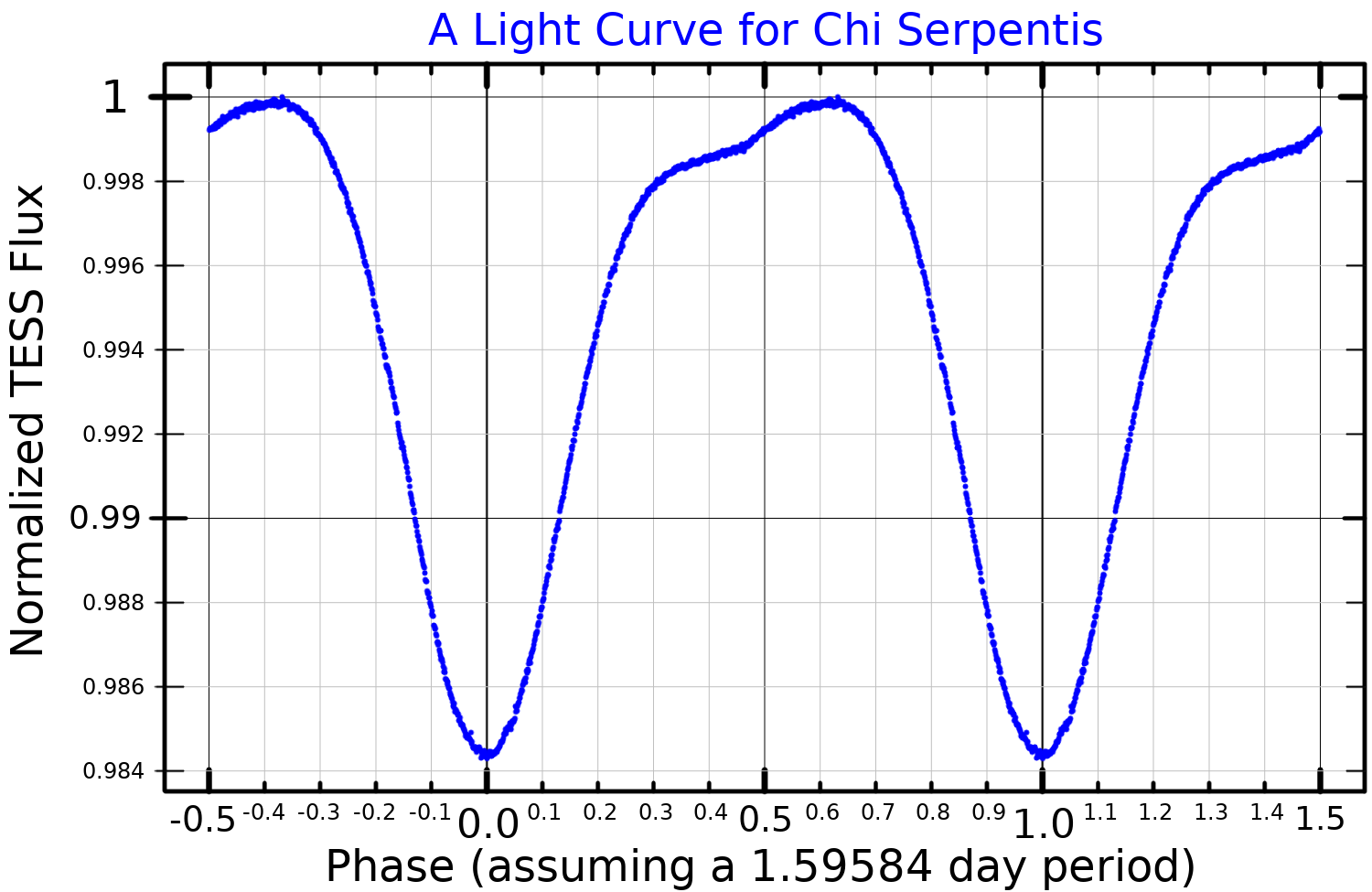
- A light curve for Chi Serpentis plotted from TESS data

Observation data Epoch J2000.0 Equinox J2000.0 (ICRS)
- Constellation: Serpens
- Right ascension: 15^{h} 41^{m} 47.41474^{s}
- Declination: +12° 50′ 51.0937″
- Apparent magnitude (V): +5.30

Characteristics
- Spectral type: A2 Vp MnEu(Sr)
- U−B color index: +0.04
- B−V color index: +0.04
- Variable type: α^{2} CVn

Astrometry
Radial velocity (R_{v})	+1.90±1.78 km/s
Proper motion (μ)	RA: +39.045 mas/yr Dec.: −2.923 mas/yr
Parallax (π)	14.7221±0.0748 mas
Distance	222 ± 1 ly (67.9 ± 0.3 pc)
Absolute magnitude (M_{V})	+1.10

Details
Mass	2.11 M_{☉}
Radius	2.25 R_{☉}
Luminosity	26 L_{☉}
Surface gravity (log g)	3.66±0.24 cgs
Temperature	9,557±274 K
Metallicity [Fe/H]	+0.35±0.13 dex
Rotation	1.5948 d
Rotational velocity (v sin i)	75 km/s
Age	212 Myr

Other designations
- χ Ser, 20 Ser, BD+13°2982, FK5 3243, HD 140160, HIP 76866, HR 5843, SAO 101683

Database references
SIMBAD	data

Chi Serpentis (χ Ser, χ Serpentis) is a solitary star in the Serpens Caput section of the equatorial constellation Serpens. Based upon an annual parallax shift of 14.84 mas as seen from Earth, it is located around 222 light years from the Sun. The star is bright enough to be faintly visible to the naked eye, having an apparent visual magnitude of +5.30.

In 1966 it was listed as a suspected spectroscopic binary, but it is believed to be single. This is a chemically peculiar star Ap star with a stellar classification of A2 Vp MnEu(Sr), indicating the spectrum shows abnormal excesses of manganese and europium. The star has 2.11 times the mass of the Sun and about 2.25 times the Sun's radius. It is radiating 26 times the solar luminosity from its photosphere at an effective temperature of 9,557 K. At the age of 212 million years, it is spinning with a rotation period of 1.6 days.

Chi Serpentis is classified as an Alpha2 Canum Venaticorum type variable star, and its magnitude varies by 0.03 with a period of 1.5948 days. The pattern of variation in the spectrum suggest there are regions of enhanced strontium, chromium, iron, titanium, and magnesium on the surface of the star. The averaged quadratic field strength of the surface magnetic field is (859.1±712.3)×10^{−4} T.
