= 64 Serpentis =

Star in the constellation Serpens

Observation data Epoch J2000 Equinox J2000
- Constellation: Serpens
- Right ascension: 18^{h} 57^{m} 16.58980^{s}
- Declination: +02° 32′ 07.2512″
- Apparent magnitude (V): 5.56

Characteristics
- Spectral type: B8 IIIe or B8/9 II
- B−V color index: 0.004±0.004

Astrometry
Radial velocity (R_{v})	−9.7±3.0 km/s
Proper motion (μ)	RA: −6.04 mas/yr Dec.: −12.00 mas/yr
Parallax (π)	2.87±0.26 mas
Distance	1,100 ± 100 ly (350 ± 30 pc)
Absolute magnitude (M_{V})	−2.13

Details
Mass	4.4±1.3 M_{☉}
Luminosity	724 L_{☉}
Surface gravity (log g)	3.47±0.12 cgs
Temperature	11,995+623 −593 K
Rotational velocity (v sin i)	171±10 km/s
Age	170 Myr

Other designations
- 64 Ser, BD+02°3738, HD 175869, HIP 93051, HR 7158, SAO 124089

Database references
SIMBAD	data

64 Serpentis is a single, blue-white hued star in Serpens Cauda, the eastern segment of the equatorial constellation of Serpens. With an apparent visual magnitude of 5.56, it is a dim star but visible to the naked eye in good seeing conditions. Based upon an annual parallax shift of 2.87±0.26 mas, it is located roughly 1,100 light years away. It is moving closer to the Sun with a heliocentric radial velocity of about −10 km/s. It is one of the brightest stars in front of the Great Rift.

Over time this star has received a range of stellar classifications, which varied considerably in the determined luminosity class. Houk and Swift (1999) have it classified as B8/9 II, Slettebak (1982) listed a class of B8 IV, Cowley (1972) has B9 III(p)? (Hg), while Frémat et al. (2006) gave it a classification of B8 III. Despite these assignments, it is still considered to be in the main sequence phase. An overshoot of the convective core due to internal waves and rotational effects are believed to be mixing in fresh hydrogen and removing helium ashes, which is extending the duration of its stay on the main sequence. It may be chemically peculiar, displaying an overabundance of mercury (Hg) in its outer atmosphere.

64 Serpentis was observed extensively during the CoRoT mission, which allowed highly accurate monitoring of its brightness. This revealed that the star displays low-amplitude variations with the main frequency being 1.56 days long, while it has smaller variations with other frequencies. These variations may be due to rotational modulation of spots or clouds in the photosphere, or possibly from non-radial pulsations. It does not exhibit the signature of a significant magnetic field.

This is a classical Be star – a rapidly rotating B-type main sequence star that has formed an orbiting gaseous disk through a mass ejection process. The circling gas is heated by the star, creating the Balmer line emission that overlays the stellar spectrum. The rapid rotation gives the star an oblate shape with a prominent equatorial bulge. 64 Serpentis is about 170 million years old with roughly 4.4 times the mass of the Sun and is radiating 724 times the Sun's luminosity from its photosphere at an effective temperature of around 12,000 K.
