= Zeta Serpentis =

Star in the constellation Serpens

- Location of ζ Serpentis (circled in red)

Observation data Epoch J2000 Equinox ICRS
- Constellation: Serpens
- Right ascension: 18^{h} 00^{m} 29.0^{s}
- Declination: −03° 41′ 25″
- Apparent magnitude (V): 4.615

Characteristics
- Spectral type: F2 V
- U−B color index: −0.002
- B−V color index: +0.386

Astrometry
Radial velocity (R_{v})	−50.70±0.2 km/s
Proper motion (μ)	RA: +155.51 mas/yr Dec.: −44.43 mas/yr
Parallax (π)	42.46±0.34 mas
Distance	76.8 ± 0.6 ly (23.6 ± 0.2 pc)
Absolute magnitude (M_{V})	2.70

Details
Mass	1.429±0.013 M_{☉}
Radius	1.961±0.071 R_{☉}
Luminosity	6.251±0.127 L_{☉}
Surface gravity (log g)	4.14 cgs
Temperature	6,529±118 K
Metallicity [Fe/H]	−0.12 dex
Rotational velocity (v sin i)	69.3±3.5 km/s
Age	2.4±0.2 Gyr

Other designations
- ζ Ser, 57 Serpentis, BD−03°4217, GC 24503, HD 164259, HIP 88175, HR 6710, SAO 142025

Database references
SIMBAD	data

Zeta Serpentis, Latinized from ζ Serpentis, is the Bayer designation for a single, yellow-white hued star in the equatorial constellation of Serpens. It is visible to the naked eye, having an apparent visual magnitude of 4.6. Based upon an annual parallax shift of 42.46 milliarcseconds as measured from the Hipparcos spacecraft, it is located 77 light years from the Sun. The star is moving closer to the Sun with a radial velocity of −50.7 km/s. It will make its closest approach in about 400,000 years when it makes perihelion passage at an estimated distance of 25.7 ly (7.88 pc).

Around 2.4 billion years old, Zeta Serpentis has a stellar classification of F2 V indicating it is an ordinary F-type main-sequence star. This star has nearly double the radius of the Sun, 1.4 times the Sun's mass, and is radiating 6.3 times the Sun's luminosity from its outer atmosphere at an effective temperature of 6,529 K. It has a relatively high rate of spin, showing a projected rotational velocity of 69 km/s.
