= Tau8 Serpentis =

Star in the constellation Serpens

Observation data Epoch J2000.0 Equinox J2000.0 (ICRS)
- Constellation: Serpens
- Right ascension: 15^{h} 44^{m} 42.1323^{s}
- Declination: +17° 15′ 51.199″
- Apparent magnitude (V): 6.1

Characteristics
- Evolutionary stage: main sequence
- Spectral type: A0V
- U−B color index: −0.03
- B−V color index: 0.00

Astrometry
Radial velocity (R_{v})	−7.47±0.53 km/s
Proper motion (μ)	RA: −28.655 mas/yr Dec.: +4.476 mas/yr
Parallax (π)	8.9643±0.0409 mas
Distance	364 ± 2 ly (111.6 ± 0.5 pc)
Absolute magnitude (M_{V})	0.88

Details
Mass	2.5 M_{☉}
Radius	2.3 R_{☉}
Luminosity	44 L_{☉}
Surface gravity (log g)	4.09 cgs
Temperature	9,727 K
Rotational velocity (v sin i)	117 km/s

Other designations
- τ^{8} Ser, Tau^{8} Ser, 26 Serpentis, BD+17°2906, GC 21164, HD 140729, HIP 77111, HR 5858, SAO 101712, PPM 131656

Database references
SIMBAD	data

Tau^{8} Serpentis, Latinized from τ^{8} Serpentis, is an A-type main sequence star in the constellation of Serpens, approximately 364 light-years from the Earth. It has an apparent visual magnitude of approximately 6.144. Although it was observed to be binary by speckle interferometry in 1985, subsequent observations show no sign of binarity, and the detection appears to have been spurious.
