= Tau5 Serpentis =

Star in the constellation Serpens

τ^{5} Serpentis
Observation data Epoch J2000.0 Equinox J2000.0 (ICRS)
- Constellation: Serpens
- Right ascension: 15^{h} 36^{m} 29.240^{s}
- Declination: +16° 07′ 08.70″
- Apparent magnitude (V): 5.93

Characteristics
- Evolutionary stage: main sequence
- Spectral type: F3V
- U−B color index: +0.04
- B−V color index: +0.354±0.004

Astrometry
Radial velocity (R_{v})	−2.0±3.7 km/s
Proper motion (μ)	RA: 72.175 mas/yr Dec.: −5.217 mas/yr
Parallax (π)	19.2694±0.0392 mas
Distance	169.3 ± 0.3 ly (51.9 ± 0.1 pc)
Absolute magnitude (M_{V})	+2.35

Details
Mass	1.54 M_{☉}
Luminosity	10 L_{☉}
Surface gravity (log g)	3.96 cgs
Temperature	6,903±80 K
Metallicity [Fe/H]	−0.20 dex
Rotational velocity (v sin i)	88±10 km/s
Age	1.90 Gyr

Other designations
- τ^{5} Ser, 18 Serpentis, BD+16°2807, GC 20985, HD 139225, HIP 76424, HR 5804, SAO 101642, PPM 131544

Database references
SIMBAD	data

Tau^{5} Serpentis, Latinized from τ^{5} Serpentis, is a star in the constellation of Serpens. The Flamsteed designation for this star is 18 Serpentis. It has an apparent visual magnitude of 5.93, which is bright enough to be dimly visible to the naked eye. The star is located at a distance of 169 light years from the Sun based on parallax measurements.

The stellar classification of this star is F3V, matching an F-type main-sequence star. It has 1.54 times the mass of the Sun and is radiating 10 times the Sun's luminosity from its photosphere at an effective temperature of 6,903 K. The star has an estimated age of 1.9 billion years and is spinning with a projected rotational velocity of about 88 km/s. It is metal poor, which means the abundance of iron in the stellar atmosphere is lower than in the Sun.
