= Tau4 Serpentis =

Star in the constellation Serpens

τ^{4} Serpentis
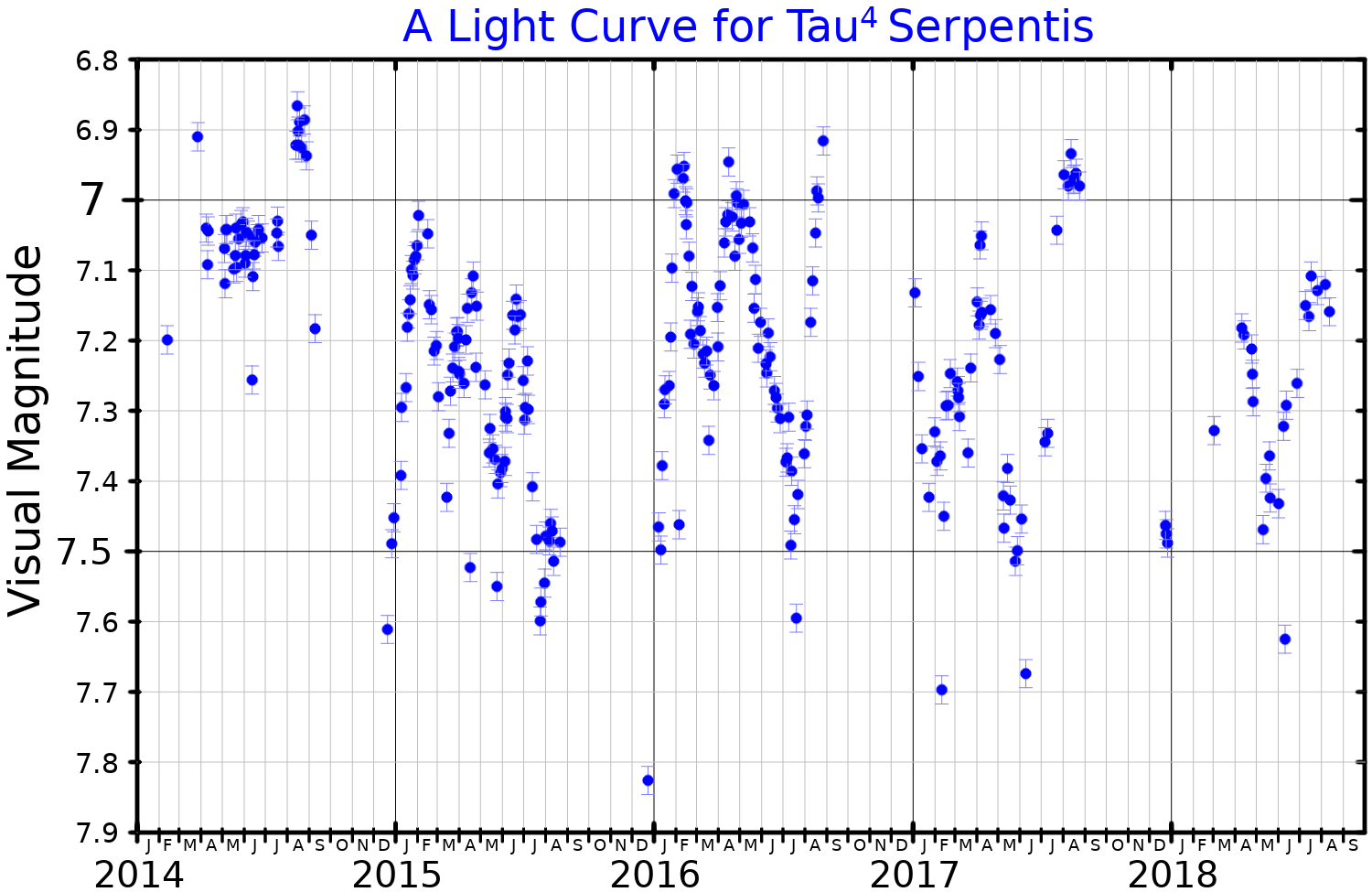
- A visual band light curve for Tau^{4} Serpentis, plotted from ASAS-SN data

Observation data Epoch J2000.0 Equinox J2000.0 (ICRS)
- Constellation: Serpens
- Right ascension: 15^{h} 36^{m} 28.1827^{s}
- Declination: +15° 06′ 05.240″
- Apparent magnitude (V): 5.89 to 7.07

Characteristics
- Evolutionary stage: AGB
- Spectral type: M5IIIa
- B−V color index: 1.2
- Variable type: SRB

Astrometry
Radial velocity (R_{v})	−26±5 km/s
Proper motion (μ)	RA: −3.623 mas/yr Dec.: +4.476 mas/yr
Parallax (π)	4.5628±0.2728 mas
Distance	710 ± 40 ly (220 ± 10 pc)
Absolute magnitude (M_{V})	−0.03

Details
Mass	3.9 M_{☉}
Radius	239 R_{☉}
Luminosity	4,969 L_{☉}
Surface gravity (log g)	−0.14 cgs
Temperature	3,178 K
Metallicity [Fe/H]	+0.21 dex

Other designations
- τ^{4} Ser, 17 Serpentis, BD+15°2890, GC 20983, HD 139216, HIP 76423, SAO 101641, PPM 131543

Database references
SIMBAD	data

Tau^{4} Serpentis, Latinized from τ^{4} Serpentis, is a variable M-type giant star in the constellation of Serpens, approximately 710 light-years from the Earth. Its brightness varies from magnitude 5.89 to 7.07, making it occasionally bright enough to be faintly visible to the naked eye under very good observing conditions.

With a spectral classification M5IIIa, Tau^{4} Serpentis is a cool red giant star. The spectrum varies, and some sources classify it between M4IIIe and M6IIIe. Some of its spectral lines show an inverse P Cygni profile, where cold infalling gas on to the star creates redshifted hydrogen absorption lines next to the normal emission lines. Sometime between the years 1868 and 1877, John Ellard Gore discovered that the star's brightness varies. It is classified as a semiregular late-type variable, and its magnitude varies between +5.89 and +7.07 with a period of approximately 100 days.

τ^{4} is unique among the stars with the Bayer designation τ Serpentis as being the only one with no HR catalog number.
