= Tau3 Serpentis =

Star in the constellation Serpens

τ^{3} Serpentis
Observation data Epoch J2000.0 Equinox J2000.0 (ICRS)
- Constellation: Serpens
- Right ascension: 15^{h} 35^{m} 33.230^{s}
- Declination: +17° 39′ 20.00″
- Apparent magnitude (V): 6.10

Characteristics
- Spectral type: G8III:
- B−V color index: +0.975±0.006

Astrometry
Radial velocity (R_{v})	−22.3±2.9 km/s
Proper motion (μ)	RA: −77.745 mas/yr Dec.: −13.437 mas/yr
Parallax (π)	9.1014±0.0329 mas
Distance	358 ± 1 ly (109.9 ± 0.4 pc)
Absolute magnitude (M_{V})	+0.78

Details
Mass	2.703+0.107 −0.040 M_{☉}
Radius	9.68+0.20 −0.19 R_{☉}
Luminosity	47.28+0.33 −0.31 L_{☉}
Surface gravity (log g)	2.478±0.005 cgs
Temperature	4,864±1 K
Age	502+51 −69 Myr

Other designations
- τ^{3} Ser, 15 Serpentis, BD+18°3044, FK5 3230, GC 20962, HD 139074, HIP 76337, HR 5795, SAO 101631, PPM 131527

Database references
SIMBAD	data

Tau^{3} Serpentis, Latinized from τ^{3} Serpentis, is a giant star in the constellation of Serpens. It has an apparent visual magnitude of approximately 6.11, which is bright enough to be dimly visible to the naked eye under favorable viewing conditions. The distance to this star is approximately 358 light years based on parallax measurements, but it is drifting closer with a heliocentric radial velocity of −22 km/s.

The stellar classification of this star is G8III:, which matches a G-type giant star. However, the trailing colon ':' indicates some uncertainty in the classification. About 500 million years old and with 2.7 times the mass of the Sun, Tau^{3} Serpentis has expanded to 9.7 times the Sun's radius, and is radiating 47 times the luminosity of the Sun from its photosphere at an effective temperature of 4,864 K.
