= Tau1 Serpentis =

Star in the constellation Serpens

τ^{1} Serpentis
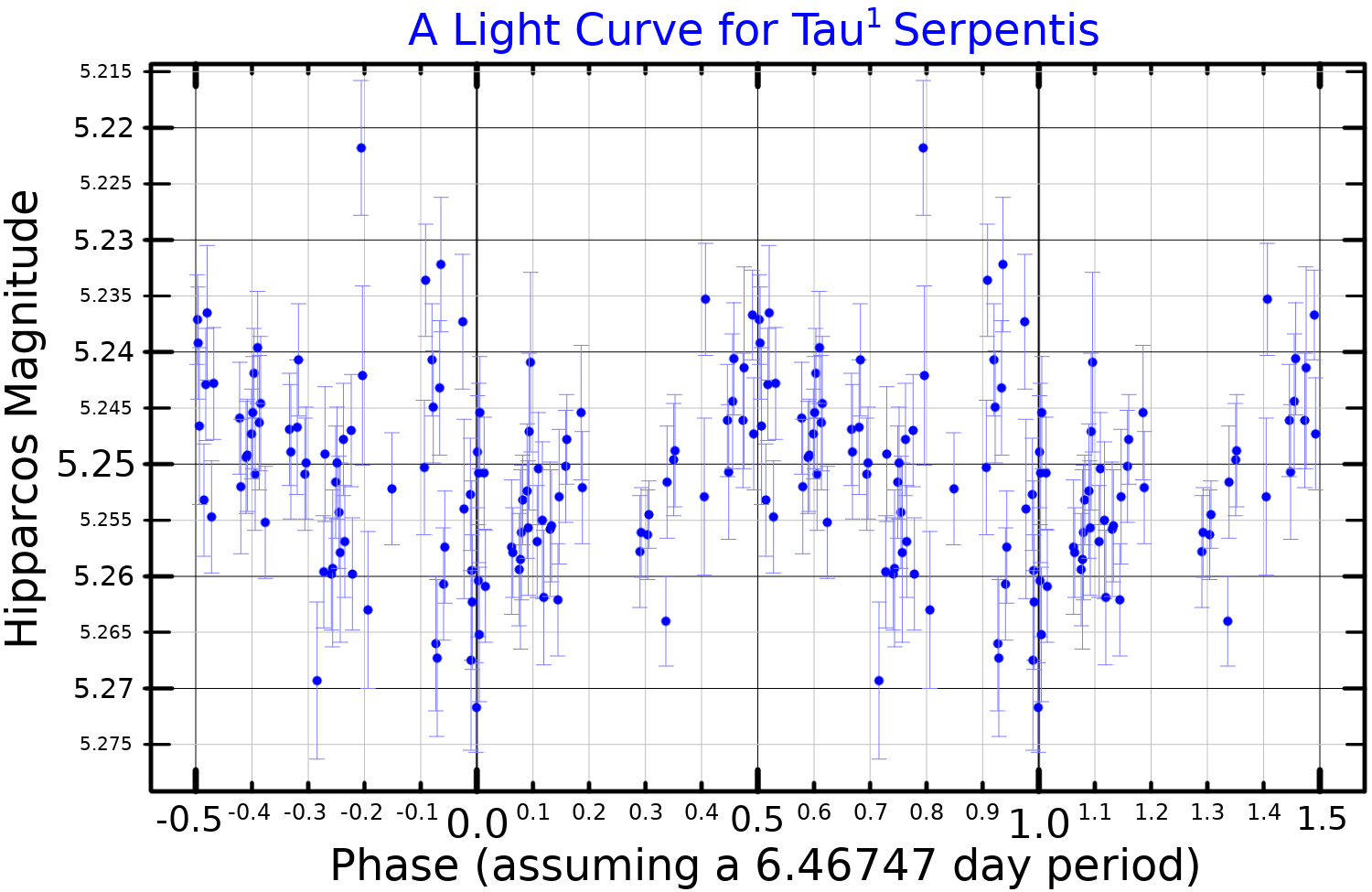
- A light curve for Tau^{1} Serpentis, plotted from Hipparcos data

Observation data Epoch J2000.0 Equinox J2000.0 (ICRS)
- Constellation: Serpens
- Right ascension: 15^{h} 25^{m} 47.39664^{s}
- Declination: +15° 25′ 40.9307″
- Apparent magnitude (V): 5.16 (5.13 to 5.20)

Characteristics
- Evolutionary stage: AGB
- Spectral type: M1III
- U−B color index: +1.95
- B−V color index: +1.650±0.006
- R−I color index: +1.04

Astrometry
Radial velocity (R_{v})	−16.51±0.23 km/s
Proper motion (μ)	RA: −12.467 mas/yr Dec.: −7.740 mas/yr
Parallax (π)	3.3030±0.1988 mas
Distance	990 ± 60 ly (300 ± 20 pc)
Absolute magnitude (M_{V})	−1.45

Details
Mass	2.3 M_{☉}
Radius	99+7 −14 R_{☉}
Luminosity	2,158±149 L_{☉}
Surface gravity (log g)	1.07±0.18 cgs
Temperature	3,954+309 −132 K
Metallicity [Fe/H]	0.05±0.06 dex
Age	933 Myr

Other designations
- τ^{1} Ser, 9 Serpentis, NSV 7074, BD+15°2858, FK5 570, GC 20740, HD 137471, HIP 75530, HR 5739, SAO 101545

Database references
SIMBAD	data

Tau^{1} Serpentis, Latinized from τ^{1} Serpentis, is a single star in the Caput (Head) segment of the equatorial constellation of Serpens. It is a red hued star that is dimly visible to the naked eye with an apparent visual magnitude of 5.16. Based upon parallax measurements, this star is located at a distance of approximately 990 light years from the Sun, while it is drifting closer with a radial velocity of −16.5 km/s.

This object is an aging red giant star, currently on the asymptotic giant branch, with a stellar classification of M1III. Having exhausted the supply of hydrogen at its core, it has cooled and expanded until it has around 99 times the girth of the Sun. It is a suspected variable star with a brightness that has been measured varying from magnitude 5.13 down to 5.20. The Hipparcos data for Tau^{1} Serpentis shows brightness variations with a period of 6.4675 days, and an amplitude of 0.0066 magnitudes. The star is radiating 2,158 times the luminosity of the Sun from its swollen photosphere at an effective temperature of 3,954 K.
