= Tau6 Serpentis =

Star in the constellation Serpens

τ^{6} Serpentis
Observation data Epoch J2000.0 Equinox J2000.0 (ICRS)
- Constellation: Serpens
- Right ascension: 15^{h} 40^{m} 59.1008^{s}
- Declination: +16° 01′ 28.517″
- Apparent magnitude (V): 6.000

Characteristics
- Spectral type: G8III
- U−B color index: +0.61
- B−V color index: +0.90
- R−I color index: +0.46

Astrometry
Radial velocity (R_{v})	3.4±0.9 km/s
Proper motion (μ)	RA: 22.16 mas/yr Dec.: −16.80 mas/yr
Parallax (π)	7.24±0.79 mas
Distance	approx. 450 ly (approx. 140 pc)
Absolute magnitude (M_{V})	−0.33

Details
Mass	3.2 M_{☉}
Radius	15 R_{☉}
Luminosity	137 L_{☉}
Surface gravity (log g)	2.64 cgs
Temperature	5,126 K
Metallicity [Fe/H]	−0.01 dex
Rotational velocity (v sin i)	4,5 km/s
Age	310 Myr

Other designations
- τ^{6} Ser, 19 Serpentis, BD+16°2816, GC 21089, HD 140027, HIP 76810, HR 5840, SAO 101678, PPM 131601

Database references
SIMBAD	data

Tau^{6} Serpentis, Latinized from τ^{6} Serpentis, is a G-type giant star in the constellation of Serpens, approximately 450 light-years from the Earth. It has an apparent visual magnitude of approximately 6.000, and is a member of the Ursa Major Stream.
