= Tau7 Serpentis =

Star in the constellation Serpens

τ^{7} Serpentis
Observation data Epoch J2000.0 Equinox J2000.0 (ICRS)
- Constellation: Serpens
- Right ascension: 15^{h} 41^{m} 54.7166^{s}
- Declination: +18° 27′ 50.531″
- Apparent magnitude (V): 5.8

Characteristics
- Evolutionary stage: main sequence
- Spectral type: A8Vam
- U−B color index: +0.11
- B−V color index: +0.20
- R−I color index: +0.10

Astrometry
Radial velocity (R_{v})	−31.38±0.12 km/s
Proper motion (μ)	RA: −61.654 mas/yr Dec.: +54.319 mas/yr
Parallax (π)	18.7185±0.0408 mas
Distance	174.2 ± 0.4 ly (53.4 ± 0.1 pc)
Absolute magnitude (M_{V})	+2.18

Details
Mass	1.8 M_{☉}
Radius	1.8 R_{☉}
Luminosity	11 L_{☉}
Surface gravity (log g)	4.20 cgs
Temperature	7,809 K
Metallicity [Fe/H]	−0.02 dex
Rotational velocity (v sin i)	78 km/s
Age	839 Myr

Other designations
- τ^{7} Ser, 22 Serpentis, BD+18°3059, GC 21111, HD 140232, HIP 76878, HR 5845, SAO 101686, PPM 131613, WDS J15419+1828AB

Database references
SIMBAD	data

Tau^{7} Serpentis, Latinized from τ^{7} Serpentis, is an A-type star in the constellation of Serpens, 174 light-years from the Earth. It has an apparent visual magnitude of approximately 5.804. It is a well-known Am star, a type of chemically peculiar star with unusually strong lines of heavier elements (metals) due to slow rotation and stratification of elements in the star's atmosphere.
