= Alpha Serpentis =

Double star in the constellation Serpens

α Serpentis
- Location of α Serpentis (circled)

Observation data Epoch J2000 Equinox ICRS
- Constellation: Serpens
- Right ascension: 15^{h} 44^{m} 16.07431^{s}
- Declination: +06° 25′ 32.2633″
- Apparent magnitude (V): 2.623

Characteristics
- Evolutionary stage: Horizontal branch
- Spectral type: K2 IIIb CN1
- U−B color index: +1.248
- B−V color index: +1.167

Astrometry
Radial velocity (R_{v})	+2.63 km/s
Proper motion (μ)	RA: +133.84 mas/yr Dec.: +44.81 mas/yr
Parallax (π)	44.10±0.19 mas
Distance	74.0 ± 0.3 ly (22.68 ± 0.10 pc)
Absolute magnitude (M_{V})	+0.88±0.03

Details
Mass	1.61±0.18 M_{☉}
Radius	12.19 R_{☉}
Luminosity	58.9±3 L_{☉}
Surface gravity (log g)	2.4 cgs
Temperature	4,687±59 K
Metallicity [Fe/H]	0.189 dex
Rotational velocity (v sin i)	4.3 km/s
Age	2.06±0.33 Gyr

Other designations
- Unukalhai, Cor Serpentis, Alpha Ser, α Ser, 24 Serpentis, BD+06°3088, HD 140573, HIP 77070, HR 5854, SAO 121157, ADS 9765, CCDM 15442+0626

Database references
SIMBAD	data

Alpha Serpentis or α Serpentis, formally named Unukalhai (/ˌjuːnək.ælˈheɪ/), is a star in the head (Serpens Caput) of the equatorial constellation of Serpens. With an apparent visual magnitude of 2.6, this star is the brightest in the constellation and it can be viewed with the naked eye from most of the Earth. Parallax measurements yield an estimated distance of about 74 light-years (23 parsecs) from the Sun.

== Properties ==
Alpha Serpentis is a giant star with a stellar classification of K2IIIbCN1, having consumed the hydrogen at its core and evolved away from the main sequence. It has 1.6 times the mass and 13.5 times the radius of the Sun. It is most likely a horizontal branch or red clump star, fusing helium into carbon and heavier elements within its core. The effective temperature of the outer envelope is 4,687 K, giving it an orange hue that is characteristic of a K-type star. It has been classified as a strong CN star, showing a higher than expected strength in the cyanogen bands.

This star is radiating about 30 times the luminosity of the Sun, while a further 32 times the Sun's luminosity is being emitted in the infrared, for 70-fold total.

== Nomenclature ==
α Serpentis (Latinised to Alpha Serpentis) is the system's Bayer designation.

It bore the traditional names Unukalhai (alternatively spelt Unuk al Hay or Unuk Elhaija) from the Arabic عنق الحيّة ʽunuq al-ḥayyah "the serpent's neck", and Cor Serpentis from the Latin "the Heart of the Serpent". In 2016, the International Astronomical Union organized a Working Group on Star Names (WGSN) to catalogue and standardize proper names for stars. The WGSN approved the name Unukalhai for this star on 21 August 2016 and it is now so entered in the IAU Catalog of Star Names.

Alpha Serpentis is a member of the indigenous Arabic asterism al-Nasaq al-Yamānī "the Southern Line" of al-Nasaqān "the Two Lines", along with Delta Serpentis, Epsilon Serpentis, Delta Ophiuchi, Epsilon Ophiuchi, Zeta Ophiuchi and Gamma Ophiuchi. According to a 1971 NASA catalogue, al-Nasaq al-Yamānī or Nasak Yamani was the name for two stars: Delta Serpentis as Nasak Yamani I and Epsilon Serpentis as Nasak Yamani II.

In Chinese, 天市右垣 (Tiān Shì Yòu Yuán), meaning Right Wall of Heavenly Market Enclosure, refers to an asterism which represents eleven old states in China and which is marking the right borderline of the enclosure, consisting of Alpha Serpentis, Beta Herculis, Gamma Herculis, Kappa Herculis, Gamma Serpentis, Beta Serpentis, Delta Serpentis, Epsilon Serpentis, Delta Ophiuchi, Epsilon Ophiuchi and Zeta Ophiuchi. Consequently, the Chinese name for Alpha Serpentis itself is 天市右垣七 (Tiān Shì Yòu Yuán qī, English: the Seventh Star of Right Wall of Heavenly Market Enclosure), and represents the state Shu (蜀) (or Shuh) (together with Lambda Serpentis in R.H.Allen's works).
