= Delta Serpentis =

Triple star system in the constellation Serpens

- Location of δ Serpentis (circled in red)

Observation data Epoch J2000 Equinox ICRS
- Constellation: Serpens
- Right ascension: 15^{h} 34^{m} 48.14762^{s}
- Declination: +10° 32′ 19.9248″
- Apparent magnitude (V): 3.80 (4.25 + 5.2)

Characteristics
- Spectral type: A9IV + F0IV
- B−V color index: 0.268±0.008
- Variable type: δ Sct (A)

Astrometry
Radial velocity (R_{v})	−41.5±2.7 km/s
Proper motion (μ)	RA: −71.48±0.91 mas/yr Dec.: 3.64±0.64 mas/yr
Parallax (π)	14.30±0.75 mas
Distance	230 ± 10 ly (70 ± 4 pc)
Absolute magnitude (M_{V})	−0.42

Details

Aa
Mass	1.98 M_{☉}
Radius	4.6 R_{☉}
Luminosity	76 L_{☉}
Surface gravity (log g)	3.46 cgs
Temperature	6,430 K
Metallicity [Fe/H]	−0.02 dex
Rotational velocity (v sin i)	99 km/s
Age	1.12 Gyr

Ab
Mass	1.80 M_{☉}
Radius	2.50 R_{☉}
Temperature	7,270 K
Age	1.12 Gyr

B
Mass	1.88 M_{☉}
Radius	3.4 R_{☉}
Luminosity	18.7 L_{☉}
Surface gravity (log g)	3.86 cgs
Temperature	6,660 K
Metallicity [Fe/H]	−0.17 dex
Rotational velocity (v sin i)	84 km/s
Age	1.26 Gyr

Other designations
- Delta Ser, 13 Serpentis, BD+11°2821, HIP 76276, ADS 9701, WDS 15348+1032
- A: GC 20942, HD 138918, HR 5789
- B: GC 20941, HD 138917, HR 5788

Database references
SIMBAD	data

Delta Serpentis, Latinized from δ Serpentis, is a hierarchical triple star system in the constellation Serpens, in its head (Serpens Caput). The light from the two stars in the system give a combined apparent magnitude of +3.80, which is bright enough to be visible to the naked eye. Based on parallax measurements, it is located at a distance of approximately 230 light years from the Sun. The system is moving closer with a radial velocity of ~42 km/s, and may come to within 115 light-years in 1.2 million years.

The primary, component Aa, is a yellow-white F-type subgiant, two times more massive than the Sun, but with 4.6 times the Sun's radius. It is classified as a Delta Scuti type variable star and its magnitude varies by 0.04 with a period of 0.1557 days. It forms a small pair with Ab, a star of undefined spectral type, with a mass 1.8 times the Sun's mass and a radius 2.5 times larger. Both are separated by 1.3 astronomical units and complete an orbit around each other every 265 d (0.73 a). They are visible with a combined apparent magnitude of +4.25. The outer, component B, is also an F-type subgiant which is slightly dimmer, with a magnitude of +5.2. A and B are separated by four arcseconds in the sky, and perform one orbit around their centre of mass once every 3,200 years.

== Naming ==
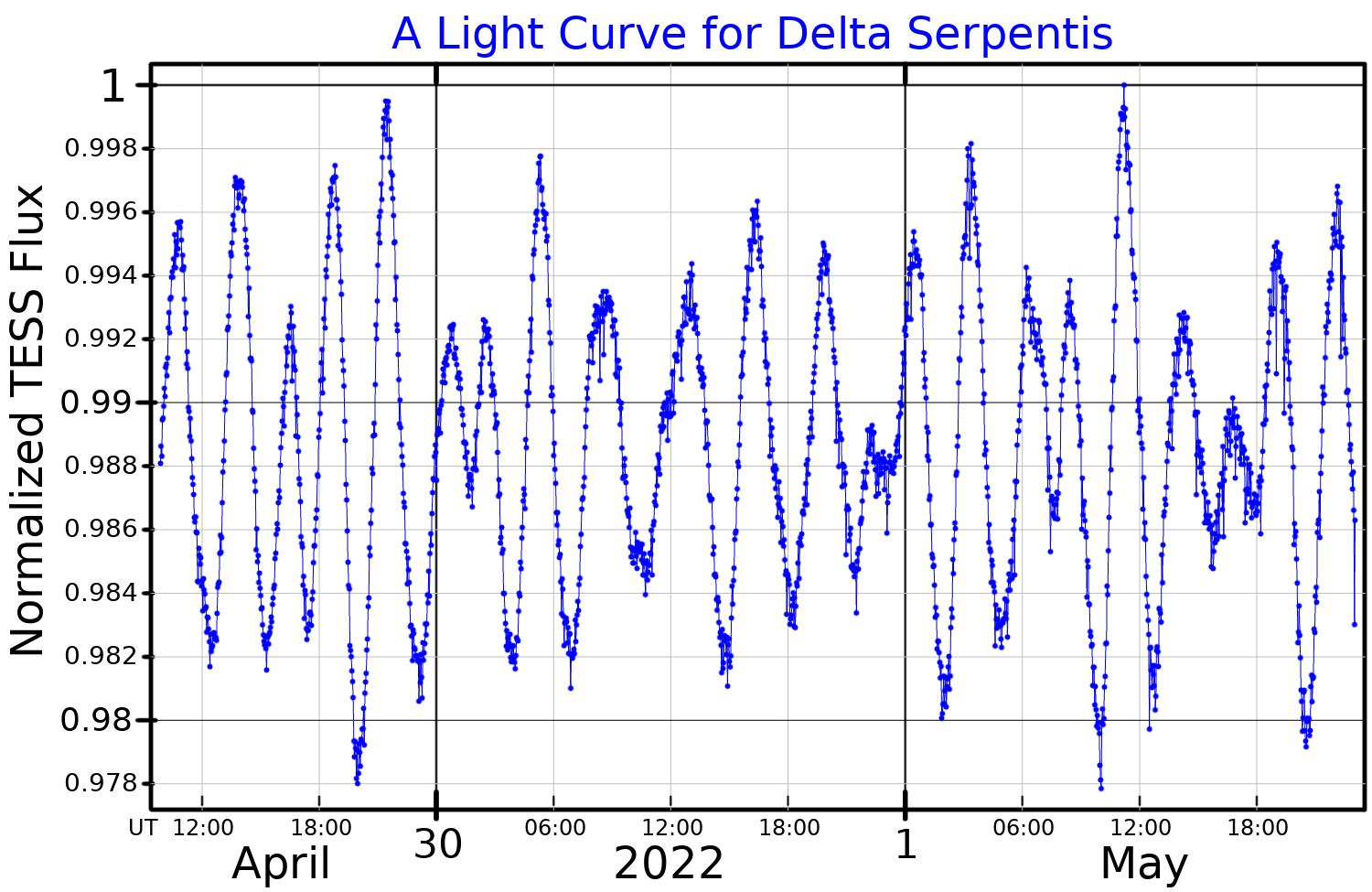
A light curve for Delta Serpentis, plotted from TESS data

It was a member of the indigenous Arabic asterism al-Nasaq al-Yamānī, "the Southern Line" of al-Nasaqān "the Two Lines", along with α Ser (Unukalhai), ε Ser (Ba), δ Oph (Yed Prior), ε Oph (Yed Posterior), ζ Oph (Han) and γ Oph (Bake-eo).

According to the catalogue of stars in the Technical Memorandum 33-507 - A Reduced Star Catalog Containing 537 Named Stars, al-Nasaq al-Yamānī or Nasak Yamani were the title for two stars: δ Ser as Nasak Yamani I and ε Ser as Nasak Yamani II (excluding α Ser, δ Oph, ε Oph, ζ Oph and γ Oph).

In Chinese, 天市右垣 (Tiān Shì Yòu Yuán), meaning Right Wall of Heavenly Market Enclosure, refers to an asterism which represents eleven old states in China and which marks the right borderline of the enclosure, consisting of δ Serpentis, β Herculis, γ Herculis, κ Herculis, γ Serpentis, β Serpentis, α Serpentis, ε Serpentis, δ Ophiuchi, ε Ophiuchi and ζ Ophiuchi. Consequently, the Chinese name for δ Serpentis itself is 天市右垣六 (Tiān Shì Yòu Yuán liù, English: the Sixth Star of Right Wall of Heavenly Market Enclosure), representing the state Qin (秦) (or Tsin), together with θ Capricorni and 30 Capricorni (according to Ian Ridpath version) in Twelve States (asterism).
