= Rutilicus =

Rutilicus man refer to:

- traditional name of star Beta Herculis
- traditional name of star Zeta Herculis
- USS Rutilicus, a Crater-class cargo ship
