= Yed =

Yed or YED may refer to:

- Income elasticity of demand
- yEd is a freely available, multi-platform, general-purpose diagramming software.
- the name of two stars in the constellation Ophiuchus:
  - Delta Ophiuchi (Yed Prior)
  - Epsilon Ophiuchi (Yed Posterior)
