= Zeta Ophiuchi =

O-type main sequence star in the constellation Ophiuchus

- Image of Zeta Ophiuchi and its surrounding nebula

Observation data Epoch J2000 Equinox ICRS
- Constellation: Ophiuchus
- Right ascension: 16^{h} 37^{m} 09.54001^{s}
- Declination: −10° 34′ 01.5097″
- Apparent magnitude (V): 2.56 – 2.58

Characteristics
- Spectral type: O9.5 V
- U−B color index: −0.857
- B−V color index: +0.032
- Variable type: γ Cas + β Cep

Astrometry
Radial velocity (R_{v})	+12.2±3.3 km/s
Proper motion (μ)	RA: +10.465 mas/yr Dec.: +24.742 mas/yr
Parallax (π)	7.4088±0.6596 mas
Distance	440 ± 36 ly (135±11 pc)
Absolute magnitude (M_{V})	−4.2

Details
Mass	18.7±0.7 M_{☉}
Radius	9.1 (equator); 7.5 (polar) R_{☉}
Luminosity	49,000+9,900 −8,200 L_{☉}
Surface gravity (log g)	3.91±0.07 cgs
Temperature	30,700 (equatorial); 39,000 (polar) K
Rotational velocity (v sin i)	382±4 km/s
Age	>6.3±0.6 Myr

Other designations
- Han, ζ Oph, 13 Oph, BD−10°4350, FK5 622, HD 149757, HIP 81377, HR 6175, SAO 160006, 2MASS J16370954-1034014

Database references
SIMBAD	data

Zeta Ophiuchi (ζ Oph, ζ Ophiuchi) is a single star located in the constellation of Ophiuchus. It has an apparent visual magnitude of 2.6, making it the third-brightest star in the constellation. Spectroscopic measurements give an estimated distance of roughly 440 light-years (135 parsecs) from the Earth. It is surrounded by the Sh 2-27 nebula, the star's bow shock as it ploughs through dense dust clouds near the Rho Ophiuchi cloud complex. It is the nearest O-class star to our Solar System.

In April 2010, ζ Ophiuchi was occulted by asteroid 824 Anastasia.

== Properties ==
Location of ζ Oph (circled)

ζ Ophiuchi is an enormous star with more than 20 times the Sun's mass and eight times its radius. The stellar classification of this star is O9.5 V, with the luminosity class of V indicating that it is generating energy in its core by the nuclear fusion of hydrogen. From Earth, the apparent effective temperature of the star appears to be 34,300K, giving the star the blue hue of an O-type star. However, since the star is rapidly rotating, the exact surface temperature varies across the surface of the star from as high as 39,000K at the poles to as low as 30,700K at the equator. The projected rotational velocity may be as high as 400 km s^{−1} and it may be rotating at a rate of once per day, close to the velocity at which it would begin to break up.

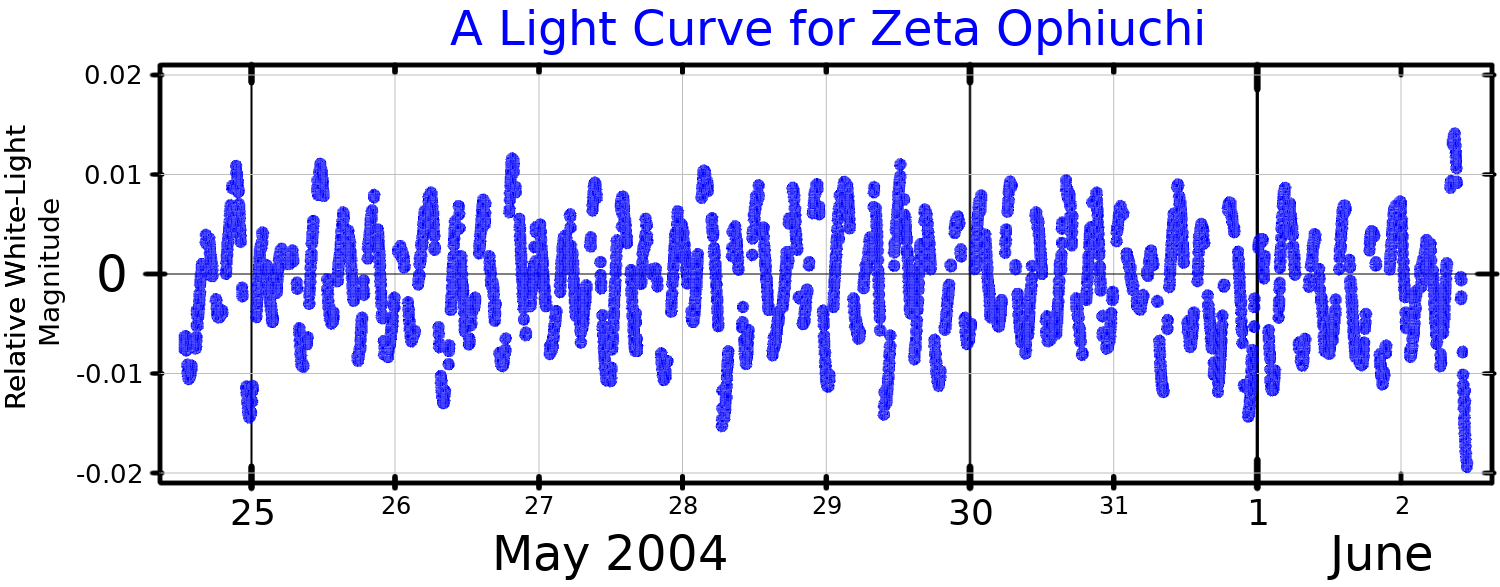
A light curve for Zeta Ophiuchi, adapted from Howarth et al. (2014)

This is a young star with an age of at least six million years. Its luminosity is varying in a periodic manner similar to that of a Beta Cephei variable. This periodicity has a dozen or more frequencies ranging between 1–10 cycles per day. In 1979, examination of the spectrum of this star found "moving bumps" in its helium line profiles. This feature has since been found in other stars, which have come to be called ζ Oph stars. These spectral properties are likely the result of non-radial pulsations.

This star is roughly halfway through the initial phase of its stellar evolution and will, within the next few million years, expand into a red supergiant star wider than the orbit of Jupiter before ending its life in a supernova explosion, leaving behind a neutron star or pulsar. From the Earth, a significant fraction of the light from this star is absorbed by interstellar dust, particularly at the blue end of the spectrum. In fact, were it not for this dust, ζ Ophiuchi would shine several times brighter and be among the very brightest stars visible. If the star's luminosity were not obscured, it would shine at magnitude 1.54, becoming the brightest of the constellation (Note: Compared to the brightest star of constellation Ophiuchius, Alpha Ophiuchi, at apparent magnitude 2.07.) and the twenty-third brightest star in the night sky. (Note: The absolute magnitude of Zeta Ophiuchi, at a distance of 140.45 parsecs, is −4.2. Putting it into the equation M_{abs}−5+5×log(Distance (ly)/3.26), it results in magnitude 1.54.)

X-ray emissions have been detected from Zeta Ophiuchi that vary periodically. The net X-ray flux is estimated at 1.2×10^{24} W. In the energy range of 0.5–10 keV, this flux varies by about 20% over a period of 0.77 days. This behavior may be the result of a magnetic field in the star. The measured average strength of the longitudinal field is about 14.1±4.5 mT.

== Bow shock ==
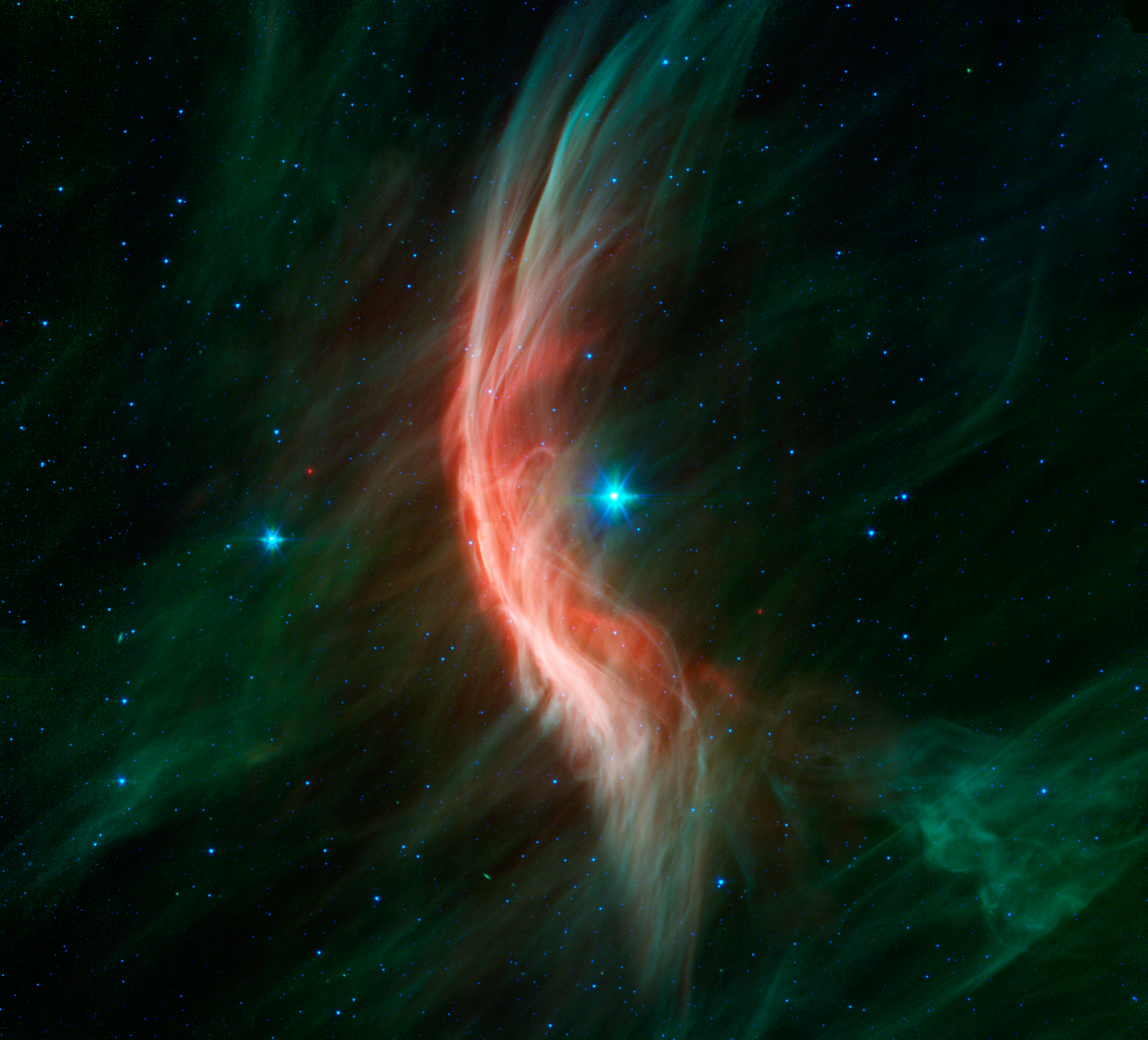
Infrared image of the shockwave (yellow arc) created by the runaway star Zeta Ophiuchi in an interstellar dust cloud

ζ Ophiuchi is moving through space with a peculiar velocity of 30 km s^{−1}. Based upon the age and direction of motion of this star, it is a member of the Upper Scorpius sub-group of the Scorpius–Centaurus association of stars that share a common origin and space velocity. Such runaway stars may be ejected by dynamic interactions between three or four stars. However, in this case the star may be a former component of a binary star system in which the more massive primary was destroyed in a type II supernova explosion. It is possible that ζ Ophiuchi accreted mass from its companion before it was ejected. The pulsar PSR B1929+10 may be the leftover remnant of this supernova, as it too was ejected from the association with a velocity vector that fits the scenario.

Due to the high space velocity of Zeta Ophiuchi, in combination with high intrinsic brightness and its current location in a dust-rich area of the galaxy, the star is creating a bow-shock in the direction of motion. This shock has been made visible via NASA's Wide-field Infrared Survey Explorer. The formation of this bow shock can be explained by a mass loss rate of about 1.1×10^{−7} times the mass of the Sun per year, which equals the mass of the Sun every nine million years.

== Traditional names ==
ζ Ophiuchi was a member of the indigenous Arabic asterism al-Nasaq al-Yamānī, "the Southern Line" of al-Nasaqān "the Two Lines", along with α Serpentis (Unukalhai), δ Ser (Qin), ε Ser (Ba), δ Ophiuchi (Yed Prior), ε Oph (Yed Posterior) and γ Oph (Bake-eo). It also shared the name Sabik with η Oph.

According to the catalogue of stars in the Technical Memorandum 33-507 – A Reduced Star Catalog Containing 537 Named Stars, al-Nasaq al-Yamānī or Nasak Yamani was the title for two stars: δ Serpentis as Nasak Yamani I and ε Ser as Nasak Yamani II (excluding this star, α Ser, δ Oph, ε Oph and γ Oph). ζ Oph was listed as Saik, an alternate spelling of Sabik (η Oph).

In Chinese, 天市右垣 (Tiān Shì Yòu Yuán), meaning Right Wall of Heavenly Market Enclosure, refers to an asterism which represents eleven old states in China which is marking the right borderline of the enclosure, consisting of ζ Ophiuchi, β Herculis, γ Herculis, κ Herculis, γ Serpentis, β Serpentis, α Serpentis, δ Serpentis, ε Serpentis, δ Ophiuchi and ε Ophiuchi. Consequently, the Chinese name for ζ Ophiuchi itself is 天市右垣十一 (Tiān Shì Yòu Yuán shíyī, English: the Eleventh Star of Right Wall of Heavenly Market Enclosure), representing the state Han (韓), together with 35 Capricorni in Twelve States (asterism).
