= Epsilon Serpentis =

Am star in the constellation Serpens

ε Serpentis
- Location of ε Serpentis (circled)

Observation data Epoch J2000 Equinox J2000 (ICRS)
- Constellation: Serpens
- Right ascension: 15^{h} 50^{m} 48.96622^{s}
- Declination: +04° 28′ 39.8311″
- Apparent magnitude (V): +3.69

Characteristics
- Spectral type: kA2hA5mA7 V
- U−B color index: +0.12
- B−V color index: +0.14

Astrometry
Radial velocity (R_{v})	−9.4±0.6 km/s
Proper motion (μ)	RA: +128.19 mas/yr Dec.: +62.16 mas/yr
Parallax (π)	46.30±0.19 mas
Distance	70.4 ± 0.3 ly (21.60 ± 0.09 pc)
Absolute magnitude (M_{V})	+2.04

Details
Mass	1.820±0.026 M_{☉}
Radius	1.783±0.040 R_{☉}
Luminosity	12.134±0.296 L_{☉}
Surface gravity (log g)	4.346 cgs
Temperature	7,928±88 K
Metallicity [Fe/H]	+0.38 dex
Rotational velocity (v sin i)	33.1 km/s
Age	500±200 Myr

Other designations
- ε Ser, 37 Serpentis, BD+04°3069, HD 141795, HIP 77622, HR 5892, SAO 121218

Database references
SIMBAD	data

Epsilon Serpentis, Latinized from ε Serpentis, is a single, white-hued star in the equatorial constellation of Serpens, in its head (Serpens Caput). It is visible to the naked eye with an apparent visual magnitude of +3.69. Based upon an annual parallax shift of 46.30 mas as seen from Earth, it is located 70 light years from the Sun. It is moving closer to the Sun with a radial velocity of −9 km/s.

This is an Am star on the main-sequence with a stellar classification of kA2hA5mA7 V. This notation indicates the spectrum displays the calcium K-line of an A2 star, the hydrogen lines of an A5 star, and the metal lines of an A7 star. It has been examined for the presence of a magnetic field, but the detected level was not statistically significant.

Epsilon Serpentis has an estimated 1.82 times the mass of the Sun and 1.78 times the Sun's radius. The star is radiating 12 times the Sun's luminosity from its photosphere at an effective temperature of around 7,928 K. It is a candidate for an infrared excess at a wavelength of 25 μm, suggesting a circumstellar disk of dust with a temperature of 250±70 K may be orbiting roughly 4.2 AU from the host star. The star is around half a billion years old and is spinning with a projected rotational velocity of 33.1 km/s.

== Etymology ==
Epsilon Serpentis was a member of indigenous Arabic asterism al-Nasaq al-Yamānī, "the Southern Line" of al-Nasaqān "the Two Lines". along with α Ser (Unukalhai), δ Ser, δ Oph (Yed Prior), ε Oph (Yed Posterior), ζ Oph and γ Oph.

According to the catalogue of stars in the Technical Memorandum 33-507 - A Reduced Star Catalog Containing 537 Named Stars, al-Nasaq al-Yamānī or Nasak Yamani were the title for two stars :δ Ser as Nasak Yamani I and ε Ser as Nasak Yamani II (exclude α Ser, δ Oph, ε Oph, ζ Oph and γ Oph).

In Chinese, 天市右垣 (Tiān Shì Yòu Yuán), meaning Right Wall of Heavenly Market Enclosure, refers to an asterism which represents eleven old states in China and which marks the right borderline of the enclosure, consisting of ε Serpentis, β Herculis, γ Herculis, κ Herculis, γ Serpentis, β Serpentis, α Serpentis, δ Serpentis, δ Ophiuchi, ε Ophiuchi and ζ Ophiuchi. Consequently, the Chinese name for ε Serpentis itself is 天市右垣八 (Tiān Shì Yòu Yuán bā, English: the Eighth Star of Right Wall of Heavenly Market Enclosure), represent the state Ba (巴) (or Pa).
