= Gamma Serpentis =

F-type main sequence star in the constellation Serpens

γ Serpentis
- Location of γ Serpentis (circled)

Observation data Epoch J2000 Equinox ICRS
- Constellation: Serpens
- Right ascension: 15^{h} 56^{m} 27.18266^{s}
- Declination: +15° 39′ 41.8096″
- Apparent magnitude (V): 3.85

Characteristics
- Evolutionary stage: main sequence
- Spectral type: F6 V
- U−B color index: −0.03
- B−V color index: +0.48
- Variable type: Suspected

Astrometry
Radial velocity (R_{v})	6.51±0.13 km/s
Proper motion (μ)	RA: +311.183 mas/yr Dec.: −1,282.767 mas/yr
Parallax (π)	89.5647±0.1835 mas
Distance	36.42 ± 0.07 ly (11.17 ± 0.02 pc)
Absolute magnitude (M_{V})	3.60

Details
Mass	1.21±0.06 M_{☉}
Radius	1.437±0.025 R_{☉}
Luminosity	2.92±0.13 L_{☉}
Surface gravity (log g)	4.15±0.06 cgs
Temperature	6,306±37 K
Metallicity [Fe/H]	−0.18±0.01 dex
Rotational velocity (v sin i)	10.2 km/s
Age	3.6+0.9 −0.2 Gyr

Other designations
- Muning, γ Ser, 41 Ser, BD+16°2849, FK5 591, GJ 603, HD 142860, HIP 78072, HR 5933, SAO 101826, LHS 408, PLX 3604

Database references
SIMBAD	data

Gamma Serpentis, also named Muning, is a star in the equatorial constellation Serpens, in the part of the constellation that represents the serpent's head (Serpens Caput). It has an apparent visual magnitude +3.85, which means it is visible to the naked eye. Based upon parallax measurements by the Gaia spacecraft, this star is approximately 36.4 light years from Earth.

== Properties ==
Gamma Serpentis is an ordinary F-type main sequence star with a stellar classification of F6 V, currently fusing atoms of hydrogen into helium at its core. It is 43.7% larger and 21% more massive than the Sun, with 2.92 times the solar luminosity. Based upon its mass, it may have a convection zone in its core region. The projected rotational velocity is 10.2 km/s, providing a lower limit to the azimuthal rotational velocity along the equator. It is younger than the Sun with an estimated age of 3.5 billion years. The effective temperature of the star's outer atmosphere is 6,306 K, giving it the yellow-white-hued glow of an F-type star.

Occasionally Gamma Serpentis is listed as having two 10th magnitude companions, but it appears that these stars are just optical neighbours.

== Etymology ==
Gamma Serpentis (Latinized from γ Serpentis, abbreviated γ Ser) is the star's Bayer designation. It was a member of the indigenous Arabic asterism al-Nasaq al-Sha'āmī, "the Northern Line" of al-Nasaqān "the Two Lines", along with β Her (Kornephoros), γ Her (Hejian) and β Ser (Zhou).

According to the catalogue of stars in the Technical Memorandum 33-507 - A Reduced Star Catalog Containing 537 Named Stars, al-Nasaq al-Sha'āmī or Nasak Shamiya were the title for three stars: β Ser as Nasak Shamiya I, γ Ser as Nasak Shamiya II, γ Her as Nasak Shamiya III (exclude β Her).

In Chinese, 天市右垣 (Tiān Shì Yòu Yuán), meaning Right Wall of Heavenly Market Enclosure, refers to an asterism which represents eleven old states in China and which marks the right borderline of the enclosure, consisting of γ Serpentis, β Herculis, γ Herculis, κ Herculis, β Serpentis, δ Serpentis, α Serpentis, ε Serpentis, δ Ophiuchi, ε Ophiuchi and ζ Ophiuchi. Consequently, the Chinese name for γ Serpentis itself is 天市右垣四 (Tiān Shì Yòu Yuán sì, English: the Fourth Star of Right Wall of Heavenly Market Enclosure), representing the state Zheng (鄭) (or Ching), together with 20 Capricorni (according to Ian Ridpath version) in Twelve States (asterism).

In the indigenous Australian Wardaman culture, γ Serpentis and β Serpentis are known as Muning, the small rock cod. The IAU Working Group on Star Names approved the name Muning for Gamma Serpentis Aa on 1 July 2026.
