= Beta Serpentis =

Binary star system in the constellation Serpens

β Serpentis
- Location of β Serpentis (circled)

Observation data Epoch J2000.0 Equinox J2000.0 (ICRS)
- Constellation: Serpens
- Right ascension: 15^{h} 46^{m} 11.25435^{s}
- Declination: +15° 25′ 18.5959″
- Apparent magnitude (V): +3.65 (3.68 + 9.7)

Characteristics
- Spectral type: A2 V or A2 IV + K3 V
- U−B color index: +0.09
- B−V color index: +0.073

Astrometry
Radial velocity (R_{v})	+0.6±0.3 km/s
Proper motion (μ)	RA: +65.38 mas/yr Dec.: −38.61 mas/yr
Parallax (π)	21.03±0.26 mas
Distance	155 ± 2 ly (47.6 ± 0.6 pc)
Absolute magnitude (M_{V})	+0.30/+6.59

Details
Mass	1.828+0.027 −0.03 M_{☉}
Radius	4.195 (equatorial); 3.07 (polar) R_{☉}
Luminosity	58.17+2.57 −2.25 L_{☉}
Surface gravity (log g)	3.27 cgs
Temperature	6,967 (equatorial); 9,359 (polar) K
Rotational velocity (v sin i)	216.6+8.1 −8.7 km/s
Age	610+14 −35 Myr

Other designations
- Zhou, Chow, β Ser, 28 Serpentis, BD+15°2911, HD 141003, HIP 77233, HR 5867, SAO 101725, ADS 9778, CCDM 15461+1525

Database references
SIMBAD	data

Beta Serpentis, Latinized from β Serpentis, also named Zhou, is a binary star system in the constellation Serpens, in its head (Serpens Caput). It is visible to the naked eye with a combined apparent visual magnitude of +3.65. Based upon an annual parallax shift of 21.03 mas as seen from Earth, it is located around 155 light years from the Sun. The system is a member of the Ursa Major Moving Group.

== Components ==
The visual magnitude +3.68 primary, component A, is either an ordinary A-type main-sequence star or somewhat evolved subgiant with a stellar classification of A2 V or A2 IV, respectively. The star is about 610 million years old with 1.8 the mass of the Sun. It is spinning rapidly with a projected rotational velocity of 216.6 km/s, which causes it to have an oblate shape, as well as hotter temperatures in the poles due to gravity darkening. The equatorial radius measures 4.2 R_{☉} and has an effective temperature of 6,967 K, while the polar radius measures 3.07 R_{☉} and has an effective temperature of 9,359 K.

The secondary component, visual magnitude 9.7 B, lies at an angular separation of 30.6 arc seconds. It is a main-sequence star with a class of K3 V.

There is a magnitude +10.98 visual companion, designated component C, located 202 arcseconds away.

== Nomenclature ==
It was a member of the indigenous Arabic asterism al-Nasaq al-Sha'āmī, "the Northern Line" of al-Nasaqān "the Two Lines", along with β Her (Kornephoros), γ Her (Hejian) and γ Ser (Zheng).

According to the catalogue of stars in the Technical Memorandum 33-507 - A Reduced Star Catalog Containing 537 Named Stars, al-Nasaq al-Sha'āmī or Nasak Shamiya was the title for three stars: β Ser as Nasak Shamiya I, γ Ser as Nasak Shamiya II, γ Her as Nasak Shamiya III (excluding β Her).

In Chinese, 天市右垣 (Tiān Shì Yòu Yuán), meaning Right Wall of Heavenly Market Enclosure, refers to an asterism which represents eleven old states in China and which marks the right borderline of the enclosure, consisting of β Serpentis, β Herculis, γ Herculis, κ Herculis, γ Serpentis, δ Serpentis, α Serpentis, ε Serpentis, δ Ophiuchi, ε Ophiuchi and ζ Ophiuchi. Consequently, the Chinese name for β Serpentis itself is 天市右垣五 (Tiān Shì Yòu Yuán wu, English: the Fifth Star of Right Wall of Heavenly Market Enclosure), representing Zhou (周, the dynasty in China), together with η Capricorni and 21 Capricorni in Twelve States (asterism).

In R. H. Allen's 1899 book Star Names, this Chinese name was transliterated as Chow, and this spelling has been used into the 21st century, but the pinyin transliteration is Zhou. The IAU Working Group on Star Names approved the name Zhou for Beta Serpentis A on 5 December 2024 and it is now so entered in the IAU Catalog of Star Names.
