= Gamma Herculis =

Spectroscopic binary star system in the constellation Hercules

γ Herculis
- Location of γ Herculis (circled)

Observation data Epoch J2000 Equinox ICRS
- Constellation: Hercules
- Right ascension: 16^{h} 21^{m} 55.21440^{s}
- Declination: +19° 09′ 11.2618″
- Apparent magnitude (V): +3.75

Characteristics
- Spectral type: A9 IIIbn
- U−B color index: +0.18
- B−V color index: +0.27
- Variable type: SRd?

Astrometry
Radial velocity (R_{v})	–35.3 km/s
Proper motion (μ)	RA: –47.39 mas/yr Dec.: +43.81 mas/yr
Parallax (π)	16.93±0.22 mas
Distance	193 ± 3 ly (59.1 ± 0.8 pc)
Absolute magnitude (M_{V})	−0.12

Details
Radius	6 R_{☉}
Luminosity	92 L_{☉}
Surface gravity (log g)	3.3 cgs
Temperature	7,031 K
Metallicity [Fe/H]	+0.07 dex
Rotational velocity (v sin i)	135 km/s

Other designations
- γ Her, 20 Herculis, BD+19°3086, HD 147547, HIP 80170, HR 6095, SAO 102107

Database references
SIMBAD	data

Gamma Herculis, Latinized from γ Herculis, is a magnitude 3.74 binary star system in the northern constellation of Hercules. It is easily visible to the naked eye under good observing conditions. The star is also known as Hejian, although this name has not been approved by the IAU Working Group on Star Names (IAU WGSN).

== Properties ==
This is known to be a spectroscopic binary system, although there is no information about the secondary component. Based upon parallax measurements, this system is located at a distance of about 193 light-years (59 parsecs) from the Earth. The spectrum of the primary star matches a stellar classification of A9III, which indicates this is a giant star that has exhausted the hydrogen at its core and evolved away from the main sequence. The effective temperature is about 7,031 K, giving the star a white hue characteristic of A-type stars. It is rotating rapidly with a projected rotational velocity of 135 km s^{−1}. The interferometry-measured angular diameter of this star is 0.95 ± 0.04 mas, which, at its estimated distance, equates to a physical radius of about six times the radius of the Sun.

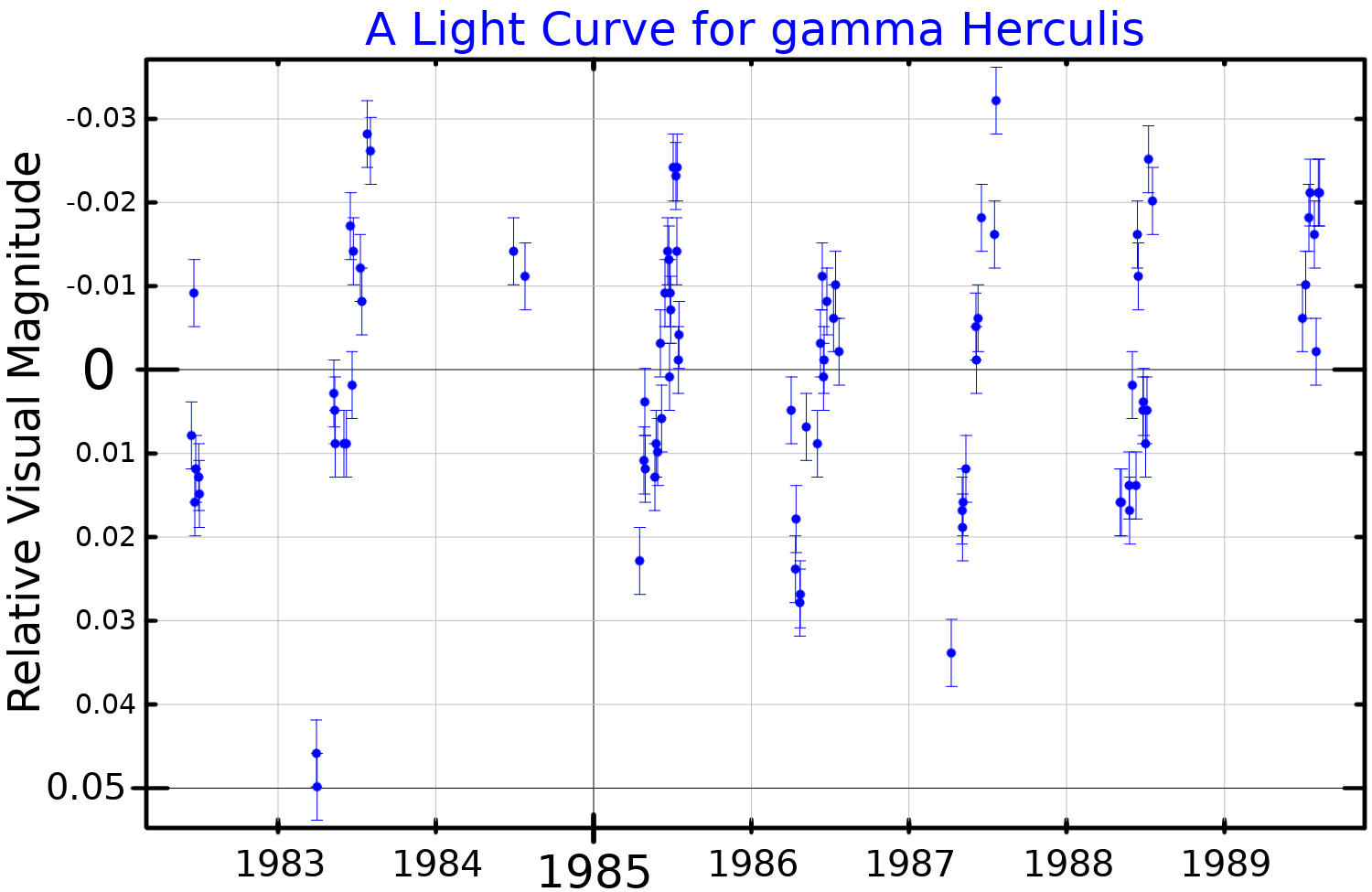
A visual band light curve for Gamma Herculis, plotted from data published by Bakos & Tremko

Observations by German astronomer Ernst Zinner in 1929 gave indications that this may be a variable star. It was listed in the New Catalogue of Suspected Variable Stars (1981) with a magnitude range of 3.74 to 3.81. Further observations up to 1991 showed a pattern of small, slow variations with a magnitude variation of 0.05. These appeared to repeat semi-regularly with a period of 183.6 days, although the spectroscopic data presented a shorter period of 165.9 days.

== Name ==
It was a member of indigenous Arabic asterism al-Nasaq al-Sha'āmī, "the Northern Line" of al-Nasaqān "the Two Lines", along with β Her (Kornephoros), γ Ser (Zheng, Ching) and β Ser (Zhou).

According to the catalogue of stars in the Technical Memorandum 33-507 - A Reduced Star Catalog Containing 537 Named Stars, al-Nasaq al-Sha'āmī or Nasak Shamiya were the title for three stars :β Ser as Nasak Shamiya I, γ Ser as Nasak Shamiya II, γ Her as Nasak Shamiya III (exclude β Her)

In Chinese, 天市右垣 (Tiān Shì Yòu Yuán), meaning Right Wall of Heavenly Market Enclosure, refers to an asterism which is represent eleven old states in China which is marking the right borderline of the enclosure, consisting of γ Herculis, β Herculis, κ Herculis, γ Serpentis, β Serpentis, δ Serpentis, α Serpentis, ε Serpentis, δ Ophiuchi, ε Ophiuchi and ζ Ophiuchi. Consequently, the Chinese name for γ Herculis itself is 天市右垣二 (Tiān Shì Zuǒ Yòu èr, English: the Second Star of Right Wall of Heavenly Market Enclosure), represent Héjiān (河間), possibly Hejian Kingdom or Hejian Commandery (see Sima Yong, the Prince of Hejian and Liu Wuzhou). Héjiān (河間) was westernized into Ho Keen by R.H. Allen, which was the meaning "between the river".
