= Kappa Herculis =

Star in the constellation Hercules

κ Herculis
- Location of κ Herculis (circled in red)

Observation data Epoch J2000 Equinox ICRS
- Constellation: Hercules
- κ Her A
- Right ascension: 16^{h} 08^{m} 04.52481^{s}
- Declination: +17° 02′ 49.1150″
- Apparent magnitude (V): 4.994
- κ Her B
- Right ascension: 16^{h} 08^{m} 04.95406^{s}
- Declination: +17° 03′ 15.6853″
- Apparent magnitude (V): 6.25

Characteristics
- Spectral type: G7III + K0IV
- U−B color index: +0.630
- B−V color index: +0.931
- Variable type: suspected

Astrometry

κ Her A
Radial velocity (R_{v})	−10.50 km/s
Proper motion (μ)	RA: −34.062 mas/yr Dec.: −6.585 mas/yr
Parallax (π)	8.5601±0.1338 mas
Distance	381 ± 6 ly (117 ± 2 pc)
Absolute magnitude (M_{V})	-45

κ Her B
Radial velocity (R_{v})	+32.21 km/s
Proper motion (μ)	RA: −19.465 mas/yr Dec.: −25.142 mas/yr
Parallax (π)	8.1307±0.0502 mas
Distance	401 ± 2 ly (123.0 ± 0.8 pc)

Details

κ Her A
Mass	3.17 M_{☉}
Radius	16 R_{☉}
Luminosity	148 L_{☉}
Surface gravity (log g)	2.90 cgs
Temperature	5,119 K
Metallicity [Fe/H]	+0.04 dex
Rotational velocity (v sin i)	9.9 km/s
Age	309 Myr

κ Her B
Radius	11 R_{☉}
Luminosity	55 L_{☉}
Temperature	4,750 K
Metallicity [Fe/H]	+0.131 dex
Rotational velocity (v sin i)	1.0 km/s

Other designations
- Marsic, κ Her, 7 Herculis, CCDM J16081+1703, NSV 7471, AAVSO 1603+17, WDS 16081+1703
- A: HR 6008, HD 145001, HIP 79043, BD+77°2964
- B: HR 6009, HD 145000, HIP 79045, BD+77°2965

Database references
SIMBAD	κ Her
- κ Her A
- κ Her B

Kappa Herculis (κ Herculis, abbreviated Kappa Her, κ Her) is an optical double star in the constellation of Hercules. The two components, Kappa Herculis A (Marsic /ˈmɑːrsɪk/, the traditional name of the system) and B, were 27.3 arc seconds apart in 2000. Based on parallax measurements from the Hipparcos mission, κ Her A is about 113 parsecs (370 light-years) from the Sun and κ Her B is 600 parsecs (2,000 light-years); more recent parallax measurements suggest that B is around 5% more distant than A.

A faint third component Kappa Herculis C is just over 1 arc-minute away. It is at the same distance as κ Her A and has an almost-identical space motion.

The star 8 Herculis forms a naked eye pair with Kappa Herculis 14′ away.

== Nomenclature ==
κ Herculis (Latinised to Kappa Herculis) is the system's Bayer designation. The designations of the components as Kappa Herculis A, B and C derive from the convention used by the Washington Multiplicity Catalog (WMC) for multiple star systems, and adopted by the International Astronomical Union (IAU).

The system bore the traditional names of "Marsic", "Marfik" or "Marfak", all of which come from the Arabic لمرفق Al-Mirfaq meaning "the elbow", a name (or some derivative of which) it shared with Lambda Ophiuchi. The Working Group on Star Names (WGSN) approved the name Marsic for the component Kappa Herculis A on February 1, 2017, and Marfik for the primary component of Lambda Ophiuchi on September 12, 2016, and they are both now so included in the List of IAU-approved Star Names.

In Chinese, 天市右垣 (Tiān Shì Yòu Yuán), meaning Right Wall of Heavenly Market Enclosure, refers to an asterism which represents eleven old states in China and marks the right borderline of the enclosure, consisting of Kappa Herculis, Beta Herculis, Gamma Herculis, Gamma Serpentis, Beta Serpentis, Delta Serpentis, Alpha Serpentis, Epsilon Serpentis, Delta Ophiuchi, Epsilon Ophiuchi and Zeta Ophiuchi. Consequently, the Chinese name for Kappa Herculis itself is 天市右垣三 (Tiān Shì Yòu Yuán sān, English: the Third Star of Right Wall of Heavenly Market Enclosure), representing the state of Jin (晉) (or Tsin), together with 36 Capricorni in Twelve States (asterism).

== Properties ==
Kappa Herculis A is a giant star with stellar classification G8III. With a mass of three M_{☉} and radius that is 16 R_{☉}, the star boasts a bolometric luminosity that is 148 L_{☉}. Its slightly companion is cooler and about a third of the luminosity.

Kappa Herculis is a suspected variable star with a reported magnitude range of 4.70 to 5.02.
