= USS Cheleb =

Cargo ship of the United States Navy

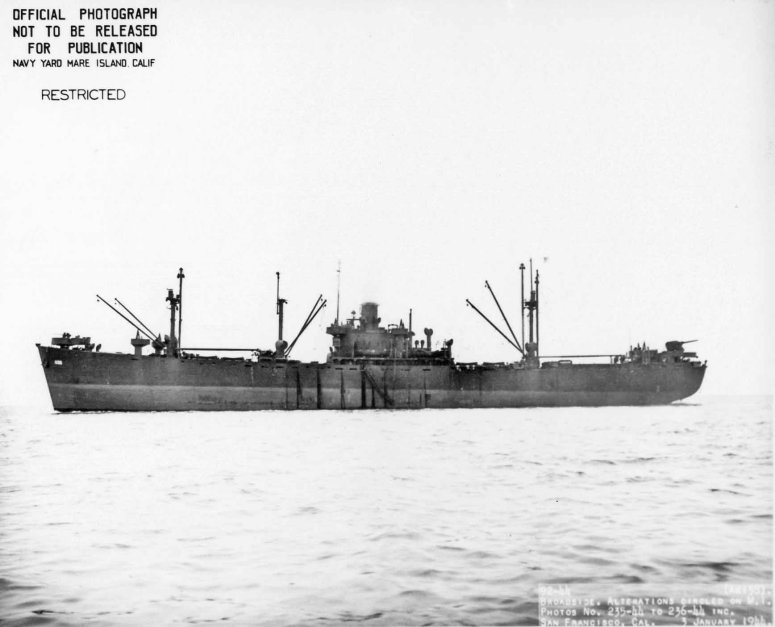
- Broadside view of USS Cheleb (AK-138), off San Francisco, California, 3 January 1944.

History

United States
- Name: Lyman J. Gage
- Namesake: Lyman J. Gage
- Owner: War Shipping Administration (WSA)
- Operator: Waterman Steamship Agency, Ltd.
- Ordered: as a Type EC2-S-C1 hull, MCE hull 520
- Builder: Permanente Metals Corporation, Richmond, California
- Yard number: 520
- Way number: 5
- Laid down: 29 December 1942
- Launched: 29 January 1943
- Sponsored by: Mrs. E. E. Carter
- In service: 6 February 1943
- Fate: transferred to the US Navy, 3 December 1943

United States
- Name: Cheleb
- Namesake: The star Cheleb
- Acquired: 3 December 1943
- Commissioned: 1 January 1944
- Decommissioned: 25 July 1946
- Stricken: 22 May 1947
- Identification: Hull symbol: AK-138; Code letters: NHER
- Fate: Sold for scrapping, 27 March 1978, removed 19 April 1978

General characteristics
- Class & type: Crater-class cargo ship
- Displacement: 4,023 long tons (4,088 t) (standard); 14,550 long tons (14,780 t) (full load)
- Length: 441 ft 6 in (134.57 m)
- Beam: 56 ft 11 in (17.35 m)
- Draft: 28 ft 4 in (8.64 m)
- Installed power: 2 × Combustion Engineering header-type boilers, 220psi 450°; 2,500 shp (1,900 kW)
- Propulsion: 1 × Joshua Hendy vertical triple-expansion reciprocating steam engine; 1 × shaft
- Speed: 12.5 kn (23.2 km/h; 14.4 mph)
- Capacity: 7,800 t (7,700 long tons) DWT; 444,206 cu ft (12,578.5 m^{3}) (non-refrigerated)
- Complement: 252
- Armament: 1 × 5 in (127 mm)/38 caliber dual-purpose (DP) gun; 1 × 3 in (76 mm)/50 caliber DP gun; 2 × 40 mm (1.57 in) Bofors anti-aircraft (AA) gun mounts; 6 × 20 mm (0.79 in) Oerlikon cannon AA gun mounts

USS Cheleb (AK-138) was a Crater-class cargo ship in the service of the US Navy in World War II. It was the only ship of the Navy to have borne this name. It is named after Cheleb, a star in the Northern Hemisphere constellation of Ophiuchus.

== Construction ==
Cheleb was laid down 29 December 1943 as liberty ship SS Lyman J. Gage, MCE hull 520, by Permanente Metals Corporation, Yard No. 1, Richmond, California, under a Maritime Commission (MARCOM) contract; launched 29 January 1943; sponsored by Mrs. E. E. Carter; and commissioned 1 January 1944.

== Service history ==
Cheleb cleared San Francisco 20 January 1944, for Pearl Harbor, where she loaded ammunition and explosives for transportation to newly won Kwajalein, which she reached 19 February. Here her cargo, destined for use in the assault of Eniwetok which began that day, was unloaded, and on 11 March, Cheleb cleared for Port Hueneme, California, base for the Pacific Naval Construction Battalions. After delivering construction equipment at Pearl Harbor, on 18 April, she returned to Oakland, California, where she was converted to a fleet issue ship.

Cheleb loaded a varied cargo at San Francisco, and with it arrived at Kwajalein 5 June 1944, to supply ships readying for the assault on the Marianas 10 days later. Cheleb also issued stores at Majuro and Eniwetok until 2 August, when she sailed from the Marshalls for San Francisco to reload. Returning to Ulithi 15 October, she supplied ships of the vast 3rd Fleet for the next month, as they carried out their operations supporting the assault on the Philippines. She returned to the west coast to reload in December, and on 22 January 1945, arrived at Eniwetok to provision ships bound for the invasion of Iwo Jima, and later ships destined for the assault on Okinawa. Another voyage to the west coast for repairs and reloading took place in May and June, and on 22 July, Cheleb arrived in Leyte Gulf to take up the task of issuing supplies once more. During this time, she serviced some of the ships conducting the final pounding air attacks on the Japanese home islands.

== Post-war decommissioning ==
Cheleb arrived in Tokyo Bay 17 November 1945, and remained to issue provisions and supplies to occupation forces at the ports of Tokyo, Yokohama, and Yokosuka. She returned to San Francisco 12 May, and later sailed to Pearl Harbor, where she was decommissioned 25 July 1946. After use in a special explosives test, she was turned over to the War Shipping Administration (WSA) for disposal, her contribution to the Navy's great logistic effort at an end.

The ship was struck from the Navy list on 22 May 1947, she was returned to MARCOM the next day, and was placed in the National Defense Reserve Fleet at Suisun Bay, California.

Cheleb was sold for scrapping on 27 March 1978, to Levin Metals Corporation, for $111,653. She was delivered 19 April 1978.

== Notes ==
Citations

== Bibliography ==
Online resources

- "Cheleb". Dictionary of American Naval Fighting Ships. Naval History and Heritage Command. This article incorporates text from this source, which is in the public domain.
- "Kaiser Permanente No. 1, Richmond CA". www.ShipbuildingHistory.com. 13 October 2010.
- "USS Cheleb (AK-138)". NavSource. 11 July 2014.
- "CHELEB (AK-138)". United States Department of Transportation. Archived from the original on December 12, 2019.
- "LYMAN J. GAGE". United States Department of Transportation. Archived from the original on December 12, 2019.
