= Beta Ophiuchi =

Orange giant star in the constellation Ophiuchus

- Location of β Ophiuchi (circled)

Observation data Epoch J2000.0 Equinox ICRS
- Constellation: Ophiuchus
- Right ascension: 17^{h} 43^{m} 28.35191^{s}
- Declination: +04° 34′ 02.2932″
- Apparent magnitude (V): 2.749 (2.75 to 2.77)

Characteristics
- Spectral type: K2 III
- U−B color index: +1.253
- B−V color index: +1.170

Astrometry
Radial velocity (R_{v})	−12.53 km/s
Proper motion (μ)	RA: −41.793 mas/yr Dec.: +150.43 mas/yr
Parallax (π)	39.2284±0.2027 mas
Distance	83.1 ± 0.4 ly (25.5 ± 0.1 pc)
Absolute magnitude (M_{V})	+0.77 ± 0.04

Details
Mass	1.44±0.16 – 1.75±0.174 M_{☉}
Radius	12.17±0.06 R_{☉}
Luminosity	57.7±2.9 L_{☉}
Surface gravity (log g)	2.33±0.07 cgs
Temperature	4,559±67 K
Metallicity [Fe/H]	0.06±0.04 dex
Rotational velocity (v sin i)	5.4 km/s
Age	2.75±0.78 Gyr

Other designations
- Cebalrai, Celbalrai, Cheleb, Kelb Alrai, Beta Oph, β Oph, β Ophiuchi, 60 Oph, 60 Ophiuchi, BD+04°3489, FK5 665, HD 161096, HIP 86742, HR 6603, SAO 122671

Database references
SIMBAD	data

Beta Ophiuchi or β Ophiuchi, also named Cebalrai /ˌsɛbəlˈreɪ.iː/, is a star in the equatorial constellation of Ophiuchus. The apparent visual magnitude of this star is 2.7, which is readily visible to the naked eye even from urban skies. The distance to this star can be estimated using parallax measurements, yielding a value of 83.4 light-years (25.6 parsecs) from the Sun.

== Nomenclature ==
β Ophiuchi (Latinised to Beta Ophiuchi) is the star's Bayer designation.

It bore the traditional names Cebalrai, Celbalrai, Cheleb and Kelb Alrai (or sometimes just Alrai), all derived from the Arabic كلب الراعي kalb al-rā‘ī "the shepherd's dog". In 2016, the International Astronomical Union organized a Working Group on Star Names (WGSN) to catalogue and standardize proper names for stars. The WGSN approved the name Cebalrai for this star on 21 August 2016 and it is now so entered in the IAU Catalog of Star Names.

In Chinese astronomy, β Ophiuchi and γ Ophiuchi form the asterism Zongzheng (宗正), which was transliterated as Tsung Ching by R. H. Allen.

=== Namesake ===
USS Cheleb (AK-138) was a United States Navy Crater class cargo ship named after the star.

== Properties ==
This is a giant star with a stellar classification of K2 III. Although it is only 2.75 billion years old, 60% of the solar age, it has reached a stage in its evolution where the atmosphere has expanded to about 12 times the Sun's radius and is radiating 58 times the luminosity of the Sun. Its outer envelope is relatively cool with an effective temperature of 4,559 K, giving it the orange hue typical of K-type stars. Like some other K-type giants, β Ophiuchi has been found to vary very slightly (0.02 magnitudes) in brightness.^{,}

Cebalrai is a member of the thin disk population. It is following a low eccentricity orbit through the Milky Way galaxy that carries it between a distance of 27.3–30.9 kly (8.4–9.5 kpc) from the Galactic Center and up to 0.62 kly (0.19 kpc) above or below the galactic plane.

Radial velocity variations with a period of 142 days are likely explained by periodic radial pulsations caused by intrinsic stellar variability.
