= USS Rutilicus =

Cargo ship of the United States Navy

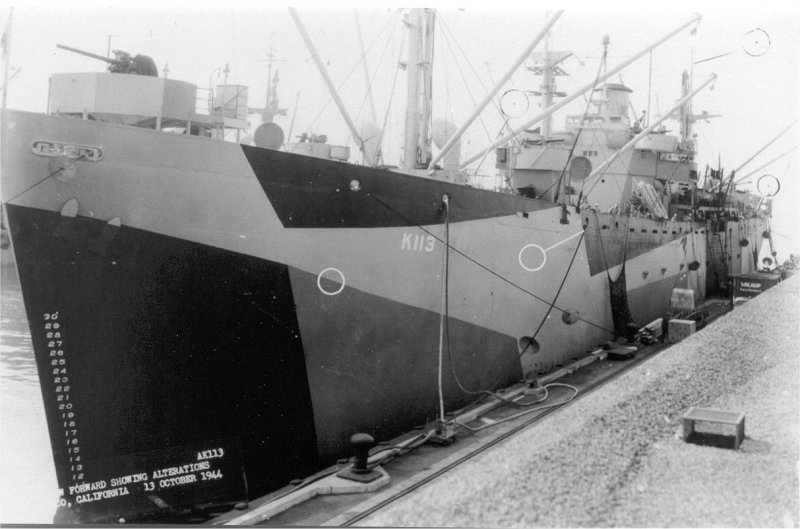
- USS Rutilicus (AK-113), moored, 13 October 1944 at San Francisco. Her camouflage is Measure 32 Design 11F.

History

United States
- Name: Andrew Rowan; Rutilicus
- Namesake: Andrew Rowan; Either the star Beta Herculis or Zeta Herculis
- Ordered: as a Type EC2-S-C1 hull, MCE hull 1643
- Builder: California Shipbuilding Corporation, Terminal Island, Los Angeles, California
- Yard number: 176
- Way number: 10
- Laid down: 2 April 1943
- Launched: 26 April 1943
- Sponsored by: Mrs. A. B. Chandler
- Acquired: 9 October 1943
- Commissioned: 30 October 1943
- Decommissioned: 17 December 1945
- Stricken: 8 January 1946
- Identification: Hull symbol: AK-113; Code letters: NTTZ
- Honors and awards: 2 × battle stars
- Fate: Returned to MARCOM, 18 December 1945, sold for scrapping, 26 October 1971, removed, 23 November 1971

General characteristics
- Class & type: Crater-class cargo ship
- Type: Type EC2-S-C1
- Displacement: 4,023 long tons (4,088 t) (standard); 14,550 long tons (14,780 t) (full load)
- Length: 441 ft 6 in (134.57 m)
- Beam: 56 ft 11 in (17.35 m)
- Draft: 28 ft 4 in (8.64 m)
- Installed power: 2 × Western Pipe and Steel Company header-type boilers, 220psi 450°; 2,500 shp (1,900 kW)
- Propulsion: 1 × Joshua Hendy vertical triple-expansion reciprocating steam engine; 1 × shaft
- Speed: 12.5 kn (23.2 km/h; 14.4 mph)
- Capacity: 7,800 t (7,700 long tons) DWT; 444,206 cu ft (12,578.5 m^{3}) (non-refrigerated)
- Complement: 16 officers 190 enlisted
- Armament: 1 × 5 in (127 mm)/38 caliber dual-purpose (DP) gun; 1 × 3 in (76 mm)/50 caliber DP gun; 2 × 40 mm (1.57 in) Bofors anti-aircraft (AA) gun mounts; 6 × 20 mm (0.79 in) Oerlikon cannon AA gun mounts

USS Rutilicus (AK-113) was a Crater-class cargo ship commissioned by the US Navy for service in World War II. She was responsible for delivering troops, goods and equipment to locations in the Asiatic-Pacific Theater.

== Construction ==
Rutilicus was laid down 2 April 1943, under Maritime Commission (MARCOM) contract, MC hull No. 1643, as Liberty ship SS Andrew Rowan, by California Shipbuilding Corporation, Terminal Island, Los Angeles, California; launched on 26 April 1943; sponsored by Mrs. A. B. Chandler; and delivered to Waterman Steamship Co. for operation on 8 May 1943. Acquired by the Navy on 9 October 1943, she was commissioned at San Diego, California, on 30 October 1943.

== Service history ==
Following a short shakedown cruise along the coast, Rutilicus took on a load of general cargo at Port Hueneme, California, and steamed in convoy for the Territory of Hawaii arriving at Pearl Harbor on 21 November. Departing the Hawaiian Islands on 4 December, she continued on to the Gilbert Islands, delivering cargo at both Tarawa and Abemama before returning to Pearl Harbor on 12 January 1944.

=== Supporting invasion of the Marshall Islands ===
She got underway on 25 January 1944, for the invasion of the Marshall Islands. Arriving at Majuro on 3 February, she delivered 150 Marines and general cargo and then returned to Pearl Harbor on 21 February. Her next voyage, 29 February to 28 March, was a run to Baker Island, to pick up Army Air Force advance base equipment for return to Pearl Harbor.

=== Island-hopping in the South Pacific ===
Rutilicus' next operations involved extensive island-hopping. Standing out from Pearl Harbor on 14 April, she steamed in convoy for Kwajalein Atoll, the Marshalls, arriving on 23 April. She then touched at Makin, Tarawa, Abemama, and Makin again, before returning to Pearl Harbor on 20 May.

=== Tinian invasion operations ===
By 14 June, Rutilicus was steaming in convoy for Eniwetok Atoll, arriving there on 25 June. For the next seven weeks, she rode at anchor there, then joined up with a convoy for Tinian, the Marianas. Following offloading at Tinian, she left for Eniwetok 14 August, touching there on 19 August, and then continued on to Pearl Harbor. Then she steamed independently for San Francisco, California, arriving on 8 September. On 12 September, she moved into Amship Corporation Shipyard, Alameda, California, for repairs, alterations, and conversion from a general cargo carrier to a fleet dry provisions issue ship.

=== Serving the Philippine invasion forces ===
Rutilicus moved to the Naval Supply Depot, Oakland, California, on 13 October, took on dry provisions, clothing, small stores, ship's store stock, and medical stores for fleet issue in the forward areas. Thirteen days later, she steamed for Leyte, the Philippines, via Manus, Funafuti, and Hollandia. By 1 December, she was serving units of the fleet in Philippine waters. The next 5 months saw her issuing stores between Hollandia, Nouméa, Espiritu Santo, Manus, Ulithi, and Guam. She was back in San Francisco on 6 May 1945.

=== Okinawa operations ===
Following repairs, she steamed on 12 June, via the Carolines for Okinawan waters. She commenced operations from Buckner Bay on 21 July; and, on 10 September, she steamed with Task Group 55.7 for Nagasaki, Kyūshū, Japan, arriving on 12 September. She shifted to Sasebo on 25 September.

== Post-war duties ==
After returning to San Francisco, she headed, via the Panama Canal, for Norfolk, Virginia. Arriving at Hampton Roads on 1 December, she reported to the Commandant, 5th Naval District for disposition.

== Post-war decommissioning ==
Decommissioned on 17 December 1945, and returned to the War Shipping Administration (WSA) the following day, she was struck from the Navy List on 8 January 1946. Rutilicus was placed in the MARCOM National Defense Reserve Fleet, and was laid up in the James River.

== Fate ==
On 26 October 1971, she was sold to Hierros Ardes, S.A., of Bilbao, Spain, for $71,520, to be scrapped. She was removed from the fleet 23 November 1971.

== Awards ==
Rutilicus received two battle stars for World War II service. Her crew was eligible for the following medals:

- American Campaign Medal
- Asiatic-Pacific Campaign Medal (2)
- World War II Victory Medal
- Navy Occupation Service Medal (with Asia clasp)
- Philippines Liberation Medal

== Notes ==
Citations

== Bibliography ==
Online resources

- "Rutilicus (AK-113)". Dictionary of American Naval Fighting Ships. Naval History and Heritage Command. 11 January 2016. This article incorporates text from this source, which is in the public domain.
- "California Shipbuilding, Los Angeles CA". www.ShipbuildingHistory.com. 13 October 2010.
- "USS Rutilicus (AK-113)". NavSource. 14 March 2014.
- "ANDREW ROWAN". United States Department of Transportation. Archived from the original on December 12, 2019.
