= Lambda Serpentis =

Star in the constellation Serpens

- Location of λ Serpentis (circled)

Observation data Epoch J2000 Equinox ICRS
- Constellation: Serpens
- Right ascension: 15^{h} 46^{m} 26.61423^{s}
- Declination: +07° 21′ 11.0475″
- Apparent magnitude (V): 4.43

Characteristics
- Spectral type: G0 V
- U−B color index: +0.11
- B−V color index: +0.60
- Variable type: Suspected

Astrometry
Radial velocity (R_{v})	−66.4 km/s
Proper motion (μ)	RA: −224.0±0.2 mas/yr Dec.: −69.8±0.3 mas/yr
Parallax (π)	83.92±0.15 mas
Distance	38.87 ± 0.07 ly (11.92 ± 0.02 pc)
Absolute magnitude (M_{V})	4.01

Details
Mass	1.09±0.04 M_{☉}
Radius	1.363±0.031 R_{☉}
Luminosity	1.98±0.023 L_{☉}
Surface gravity (log g)	4.09 cgs
Temperature	5,901±78 K
Metallicity [Fe/H]	−0.03 dex
Rotation	24.3+3.7 −4.9 days
Rotational velocity (v sin i)	3 km/s
Age	5.4±0.7 Gyr

Other designations
- λ Ser, 27 Serpentis, NSV 7246, BD+07°3023, GJ 598, HD 141004, HIP 77257, HR 5868, SAO 121186, 2MASS J15462661+0721109

Database references
SIMBAD	data
Exoplanet Archive	data

Lambda Serpentis, Latinized from λ Serpentis, is a star in the constellation Serpens, in its head (Serpens Caput). It has an apparent visual magnitude of 4.43, making it visible to the naked eye. Based upon parallax measurements, this star lies at a distance of about 38.9 light-years (11.9 parsecs) from Earth. Lambda Serpentis is moving toward the Solar System with a radial velocity of 66.4 km s^{−1}. In about 166,000 years, this system will make its closest approach of the Sun at a distance of 7.371 ± 0.258 light-years (2.260 ± 0.079 parsecs), before moving away thereafter.

This star is 36% larger and 9% more massive than the Sun, although it has a similar stellar classification. It is shining with nearly double the Sun's luminosity and this energy is being radiated from the star's outer atmosphere at an effective temperature of 5,901 K. A periodicity of 1837 days (5.03 years) was suspected by Morbey & Griffith (1987), but it is probably bound to stellar activity. However, McDonald Observatory team has set limits to the presence of one or more exoplanets around Lambda Serpentis with masses between 0.16 and 2 Jupiter masses and average separations spanning between 0.05 and 5.2 Astronomical Units.

== Planetary system ==
In 2020, a candidate planet was detected orbiting Lambda Serpentis (HD 141004). With a minimum mass of 0.043 M_{J} (13.6 M_{🜨}) and an orbital period of 15 days, this would most likely be a hot Neptune. The planet was confirmed in 2021.

The Lambda Serpentis planetary system
Companion (in order from star)	Mass	Semimajor axis (AU)	Orbital period (days)	Eccentricity	Inclination (°)	Radius
b	≥0.0428^{+0.0047}_{−0.0045} M_{J}	0.1238±0.002	15.5083^{+0.0016}_{−0.0018}	0.16^{+0.11}_{−0.10}	—	—
