= Gamma Ophiuchi =

Star in the constellation Ophiuchus

γ Ophiuchi
- Location of γ Ophiuchi (circled)

Observation data Epoch J2000.0 Equinox ICRS
- Constellation: Ophiuchus
- Right ascension: 17^{h} 47^{m} 53.55973^{s}
- Declination: +02° 42′ 26.2000″
- Apparent magnitude (V): +3.753

Characteristics
- Evolutionary stage: main sequence
- Spectral type: A0 V or A1VnkA0mA0
- U−B color index: +0.040
- B−V color index: +0.033

Astrometry
Radial velocity (R_{v})	−7.6±0.3 km/s
Proper motion (μ)	RA: −24.64 mas/yr Dec.: −74.42 mas/yr
Parallax (π)	31.73±0.21 mas
Distance	102.8 ± 0.7 ly (31.5 ± 0.2 pc)
Absolute magnitude (M_{V})	+1.26

Details
Mass	2.9 M_{☉}
Radius	2.01±0.02 R_{☉}
Luminosity	24.5±0.5 L_{☉}
Surface gravity (log g)	4.03 cgs
Temperature	9,070±100 K
Rotational velocity (v sin i)	220 km/s
Age	184+93 −134 Myr

Other designations
- Bake-eo, Bake Eo, γ Oph, 62 Ophiuchi, BD+02 3403, FK5 668, GC 24162, HD 161868, HIP 87108, HR 6629, SAO 122754

Database references
SIMBAD	data

Gamma Ophiuchi, Latinized from γ Ophiuchi, formally named Bake-eo, is a fourth-magnitude star in the constellation Ophiuchus. Together with Beta Ophiuchi, it forms the serpent-holder's right shoulder. The star is visible to the naked eye with an apparent visual magnitude of +3.75. Based upon an annual parallax shift of 31.73 mas as seen from Earth, it is located 103 light-years from the Sun. It is moving closer to the Sun with a radial velocity of −7.6 km/s.

== Nomenclature ==
This star is known also as Muliphen, although at least two more stars are known with this name: Gamma Canis Majoris (often spelled as Muliphein) and Gamma Centauri (often spelled as Muhlifain). Muliphein is the IAU-approved name of Gamma Canis Majoris.

This star has the Marshallese name Bake-eo (or Bake Eo, pronounced "bakey-yew"), which refers to the spondylus mussel. The IAU Working Group on Star Names approved the name Bake-eo for γ Ophiuchi on 20 August 2024 and it is now so entered in the IAU Catalog of Star Names.

In Chinese astronomy, β Ophiuchi and γ Ophiuchi form the asterism Zongzheng (宗正), which was transliterated as Tsung Ching by R. H. Allen.

== Description ==
Image of the debris disk from the REASONS survey

This is an A-type main-sequence star with a stellar classification of A0 V. Gray et al. (2003) lists a classification of A1VnkA0mA0, indicating it is of type A1 V with the calcium K-line and metallic lines of an A0 star. It is approximately 184 million years old and is spinning rapidly with a projected rotational velocity of 220 km/s. Gamma Ophiuchi has nearly three times the mass of the Sun and 1.8 times the Sun's radius. The star shines with 29 times the luminosity of the Sun, which is being emitted from its outer atmosphere at an effective temperature of 9,506 K. It is radiating an excess emission of infrared, suggesting the presence of a circumstellar disk of dust at an orbital radius of 64 AU from the host star. The disk was imaged in 2025.

The Gamma Ophiuchi planetary system
Companion (in order from star)	Mass	Semimajor axis (AU)	Orbital period (days)	Eccentricity	Inclination (°)	Radius
circumstellar disc	124+6 −5 AU				68±2°	—
