= Heavenly Market enclosure =

The Heavenly Market Enclosure (天市垣, Tian Shi Yuan), is one of the San Yuan or Three enclosures. Stars and constellations of this group are visible during late summer and early autumn in the Northern Hemisphere (late winter and early spring in the Southern). The Summer Triangle lies directly to the northeast.

== Asterisms ==
The asterisms are:

English name	Chinese name	Number of stars	Western Constellation	Additional notes	Representing
Left Wall	天市左垣	11	Hercules / Serpens / Ophiuchus / Aquila	Consists of : Wei region (魏) → 1st star; Zhao region (趙) → 2nd star; Jiuhe region (九河) → 3rd star; Zhongshan region (中山) → 4th star; Qi region (齊) → 5th star; Wu region and Yue region (吳越) → 6th star; Xu region (徐) → 7th star; Donghai region (東海) → 8th star; Yan region (燕) → 9th star; Nanhai region (南海) → 10th star; Song region (宋) → 11th star	Eleven cities (star) in the left
Right Wall	天市右垣	11	Serpens / Ophiuchus / Hercules	Consists of : Hezhong region (河中) → 1st star; Hejian region (河間) → 2nd star; Jin region (晉) → 3rd star; Zheng region (鄭) → 4th star; Zhou region (周) → 5th star; Qin region (秦) → 6th star; Shu region (蜀) → 7th star; Ba region (巴) → 8th star; Liang region (梁) → 9th star; Chu region (楚) → 10th star; Han region (韓) → 11th star	Eleven cities (star) in the right
Municipal Office	市樓	6	Serpens / Ophiuchus		Government organization
Commodity Market	車肆	2	Ophiuchus		Department Store Market
Official for the Royal Clan	宗正	2	Ophiuchus		Officials in charge of royal affairs
Official of Religious Ceremonies	宗人	4	Ophiuchus		Royal bulk, or ritualists of the Zhou Dynasty
Patriarchal Clan	宗	2	Hercules		Imperial consultant
Textile Ruler	帛度	2	Hercules		Scale, or the cloth market
Butcher's Shops	屠肆	2	Hercules		Slaughter market
Astrologer	候	1	Ophiuchus		Official who responsible for observing astronomical phenomena
Emperor's Seat	帝座	1	Hercules		Refers to the Great Emperor
Eunuch Official	宦者	2	Hercules / Ophiuchus		Superintendent of the eunuch
Jewel Market	列肆	2	Ophiuchus / Serpens		Gem and treasure market
Dipper for Liquids	斗	5	Hercules		The apparatus to take the liquid
Dipper for Solids	斛	4	Hercules / Ophiuchus		The apparatus to take the solid
Coiled Thong	貫索	9	Corona Borealis		The civilian population in prison, or rope market
Seven Excellencies	七公	7	Hercules / Boötes		Seven high rank Government Officials
Celestial Discipline	天紀	9	Hercules / Corona Borealis		Officials who maintain discipline the world, or to record of livestock
Woman's Bed	女床	3	Hercules		The emperor's concubines, or bird market, or the name of a mountain

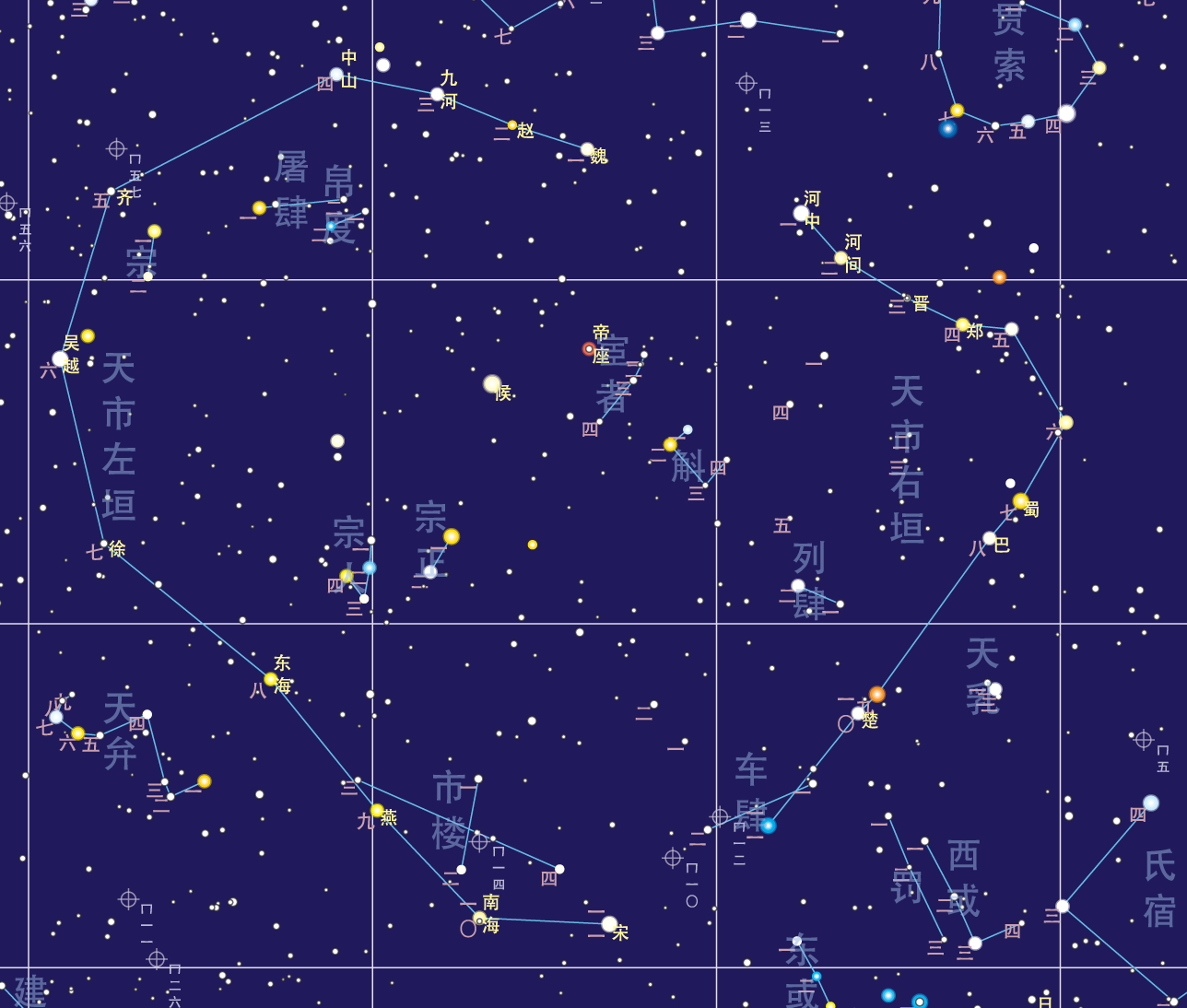
Tiān Shì Yuán map

== See also ==
- Twenty-eight mansions
- Summer Triangle
