= Microscopium in Chinese astronomy =

According to traditional Chinese uranography, the modern constellation Microscopium is located within the northern quadrant of the sky, which is symbolized as the Black Tortoise of the North (北方玄武, Běi Fāng Xuán Wǔ).

The name of the western constellation in modern Chinese is 顯微鏡座 (xiǎn wēi jìng zuò), meaning "the microscope constellation".

== Stars ==
The map of Chinese constellation in constellation Microscopium area consists of:

Four Symbols	Mansion (Chinese name)	Romanization	Translation	Asterisms (Chinese name)	Romanization	Translation	Western star name	Proper Name	Chinese star name	Romanization	Translation
Black Tortoise of the North (北方玄武)	牛	Niú	Ox								
Black Tortoise of the North (北方玄武)	牛	Niú	Ox	天田	Tiāntián	Celestial Farmland	3 PsA		天田一	Tiāntiányī	1st star
Black Tortoise of the North (北方玄武)	牛	Niú	Ox	九坎	Jiǔkǎn	Nine Water Wells					
Black Tortoise of the North (北方玄武)	牛	Niú	Ox	九坎	Jiǔkǎn	Nine Water Wells	θ^{1} Mic		九坎一	Jiǔkǎnyī	1st star
Black Tortoise of the North (北方玄武)	牛	Niú	Ox	九坎	Jiǔkǎn	Nine Water Wells	η Mic		九坎二	Jiǔkǎnèr	2nd star
Black Tortoise of the North (北方玄武)	牛	Niú	Ox	九坎	Jiǔkǎn	Nine Water Wells	ι Mic		九坎三	Jiǔkǎnsān	3rd star
Black Tortoise of the North (北方玄武)	牛	Niú	Ox	九坎	Jiǔkǎn	Nine Water Wells	ζ Mic		九坎四	Jiǔkǎnsì	4th star
Black Tortoise of the North (北方玄武)	虛	Xū	Emptiness	璃瑜	Líyú	Jade Ornament on Ladies' Wear					
Black Tortoise of the North (北方玄武)	虛	Xū	Emptiness	璃瑜	Líyú	Jade Ornament on Ladies' Wear	α Mic		璃瑜一	Líyúyī	1st star
Black Tortoise of the North (北方玄武)	虛	Xū	Emptiness	璃瑜	Líyú	Jade Ornament on Ladies' Wear	ε Mic	Aerostaticus	璃瑜二	Líyúèr	2nd star
Black Tortoise of the North (北方玄武)	虛	Xū	Emptiness	璃瑜	Líyú	Jade Ornament on Ladies' Wear	γ Mic		璃瑜增一	Líyúzēngyī	1st additional star
Black Tortoise of the North (北方玄武)	虛	Xū	Emptiness	璃瑜	Líyú	Jade Ornament on Ladies' Wear	HD 200763		璃瑜增二	Líyúzēngèr	2nd additional star

== See also ==
- Chinese astronomy
- Traditional Chinese star names
- Chinese constellations
