= Theta Microscopii =

The Bayer designation Theta Microscopii (θ Mic / θ Microscopii) is shared by two star systems, in the constellation Microscopium:

- θ^{1} Microscopii, an A7 main sequence star
- θ^{2} Microscopii, a multiple star
