= ESO 286-19 =

Galaxy in the constellation Microscopium

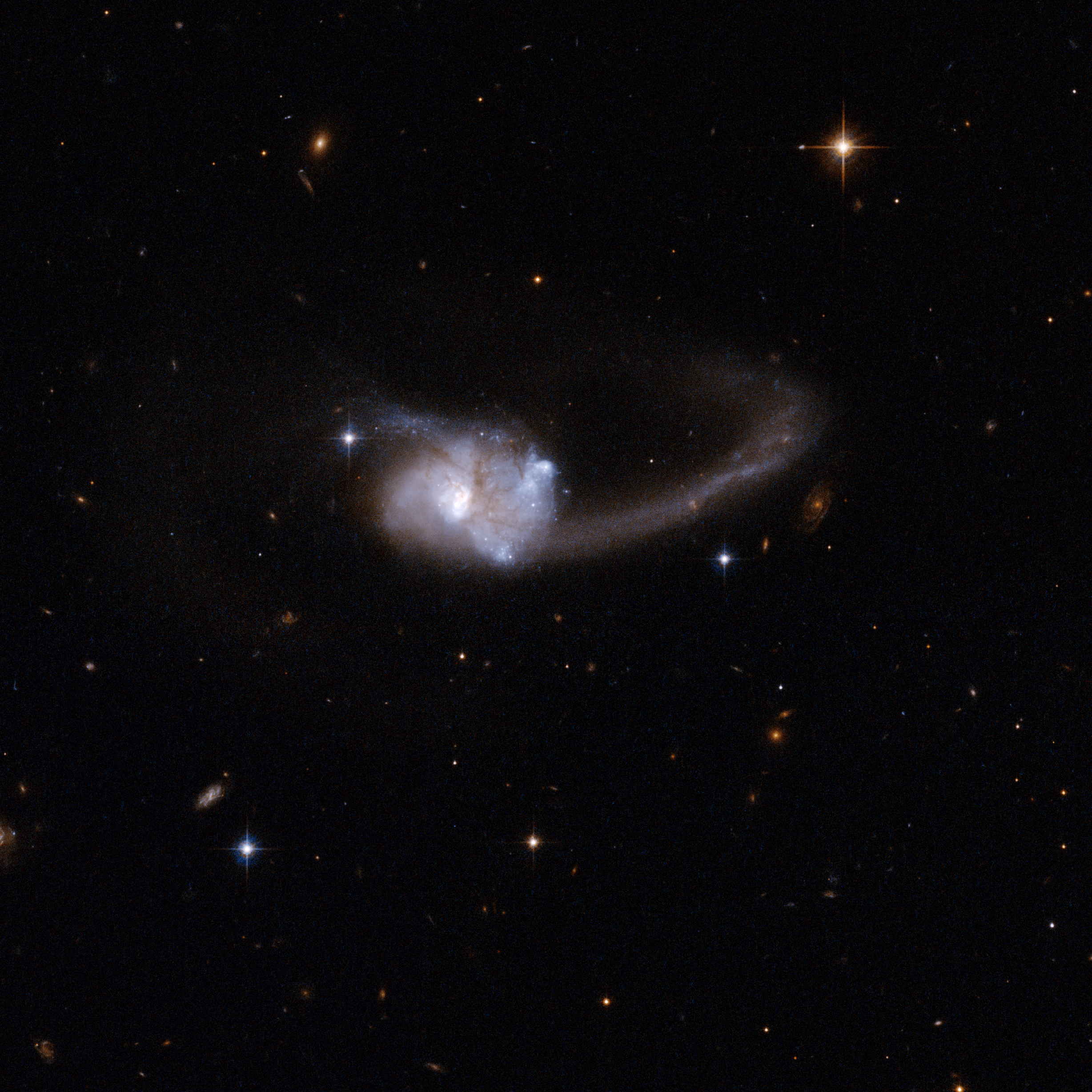
- HST image of ESO 286-19

Observation data (J2000 epoch)
- Constellation: Microscopium
- Right ascension: 20^{h} 58^{m} 26.80^{s}
- Declination: −42° 39′ 00.43″
- Redshift: 0.042996
- Heliocentric radial velocity: 12,890 km/s
- Distance: 609 Mly (186.72 Mpc)
- Apparent magnitude (V): 0.14
- Apparent magnitude (B): 0.18

Characteristics
- Type: HII;ULRG, LINER
- Apparent size (V): 1.05' x 0.40'
- Notable features: luminous infrared galaxy

Other designations
- ESO 286-IG019, IRAS 20551-4250, PGC 65817, AM 2055-425

ESO 286-19 known as IRAS 20551-4250, is a galaxy merger located in the constellation of Microscopium. It is located 609 million light years away from Earth. It is an ultraluminous infrared galaxy.

== Characteristics ==
ESO 286-19 is a late-stager merger. A product of two colliding disk galaxies, it is found distorted, with a long tidal tail that is extending to the right from its main body while the shorter tidal tail is curving towards the left direction. It has knotted structures. There is a distribution of cold molecular gas from the galaxy's southeast region.

A single nucleus has been detected in ESO 286–19 by both XMM Newton and Chandra X-ray Observatory although undetected by NuSTAR. According to observations made by Chandra, the soft X-ray emission of the galaxy is elongated while having a point-like hard X-ray emission. However, its polarized flux is faint.

ESO 286-19 is also an extremely bright galaxy with a luminosity of L_{IR} ~ 10^{12} L_{Θ}. It also experiences a starburst. A spectroscopic and photometric analysis found the galaxy has an old stellar population mass of 3×10^{11} M_{Θ}. It also has much young, recently formed stars of 8×10^{9} M_{Θ} contributing to ~ 2 of the stellar mass. The galaxy also has molecular hydrogen with a mass of 4×10^{10} M_{Θ}.

According to results from Cycle 2 observations conducted by Atacama Large Millimeter Array, ESO 286-19 harbors an obscured active galactic nucleus. The nucleus shows HCN/HCO^{+}/HNC J = 3-2 emission lines that are found vibrationally excited with a high energy level of v _{2} = 1. Due to a likely line opacity correction, the lines are found to have an excitation temperature and flux ratio amidst v _{2} = 1f and v = 0. Additionally, a broad emission line component was found from a CO J = 3-2 emission line with a measurement of full width at half maximum (FWHM) ~ 500 km s^{−1}. This finding suggested it was caused by molecular outflow in the galaxy with a mass of M_{outf} ~5.8×10^{6} M_{Θ} and a kinetic power of P_{outf} ~ 1%. Based on the outflow, it has an X-ray luminosity of L_{2-10keV} = 2.1×10^{41} ergs^{−1}.
