= 2 Piscis Austrini =

Star in the constellation Microscopium

- Location of 2 PsA (circled)

Observation data Epoch J2000.0 Equinox ICRS
- Constellation: Microscopium
- Right ascension: 21^{h} 06^{m} 24.67730^{s}
- Declination: −32° 20′ 29.8282″
- Apparent magnitude (V): 5.20±0.01

Characteristics
- Evolutionary stage: horizontal branch
- Spectral type: K2 III or K3 III
- B−V color index: +1.10

Astrometry
Radial velocity (R_{v})	3.1±2.8 km/s
Proper motion (μ)	RA: −5.949 mas/yr Dec.: +7.786 mas/yr
Parallax (π)	9.2085±0.0973 mas
Distance	354 ± 4 ly (109 ± 1 pc)
Absolute magnitude (M_{V})	+0.19

Details
Radius	16.4 R_{☉}
Luminosity	122±2 L_{☉}
Surface gravity (log g)	2.88±0.15 cgs
Temperature	4,632±24 K
Metallicity [Fe/H]	−0.01 dex
Rotational velocity (v sin i)	<1.2 km/s

Other designations
- 2 PsA, 49 G. Microscopii, CD−32°16398, CPD−32°6288, GC 29465, HD 200763, HIP 104174, HR 8076, SAO 212716

Database references
SIMBAD	data

2 Piscis Austrini, also known as HD 200763 or simply 2 PsA, is a solitary orange hued star located in the southern constellation Microscopium. It was once part of Piscis Austrinus, the southern fish. The object has an apparent magnitude of 5.2, making it faintly visible to the naked eye under ideal conditions. Based on parallax measurements from the Gaia satellite, it is estimated to be 354 light years away from the Solar System. However, it is receding with a poorly constrained heliocentric radial velocity of 3.1 km/s. At its current distance, 2 PsA's brightness is diminished by 0.11 magnitudes due to interstellar dust. It has an absolute magnitude of 0.19.

This is an evolved star with a stellar classification of either K2 III or K3 III. Nevertheless, both indicate that the object is a red giant. 2 PsA is estimated to have 16.4 times the Sun's radius. It is currently on the horizontal branch (HB), generating energy through helium fusion at its core. The star is located in a metal rich region of the HB called the red clump. At present 2 PsA has 2.36 times the mass of the Sun and is radiating 122 times the Sun's luminosity from its enlarged photosphere at an effective temperature of 4,632 K. 2 PsA has a solar metallicity and spins slowly with a projected rotational velocity lower than 1.2 km/s.

This star was known by Bode as Epsilon Microscopii, however after Globus Aerostaticus was no longer recognized, the much brighter star 4 Piscis Austrini took the designation, and is known by Epsilon Microscopii today.
