= Globus Aerostaticus =

Former constellation

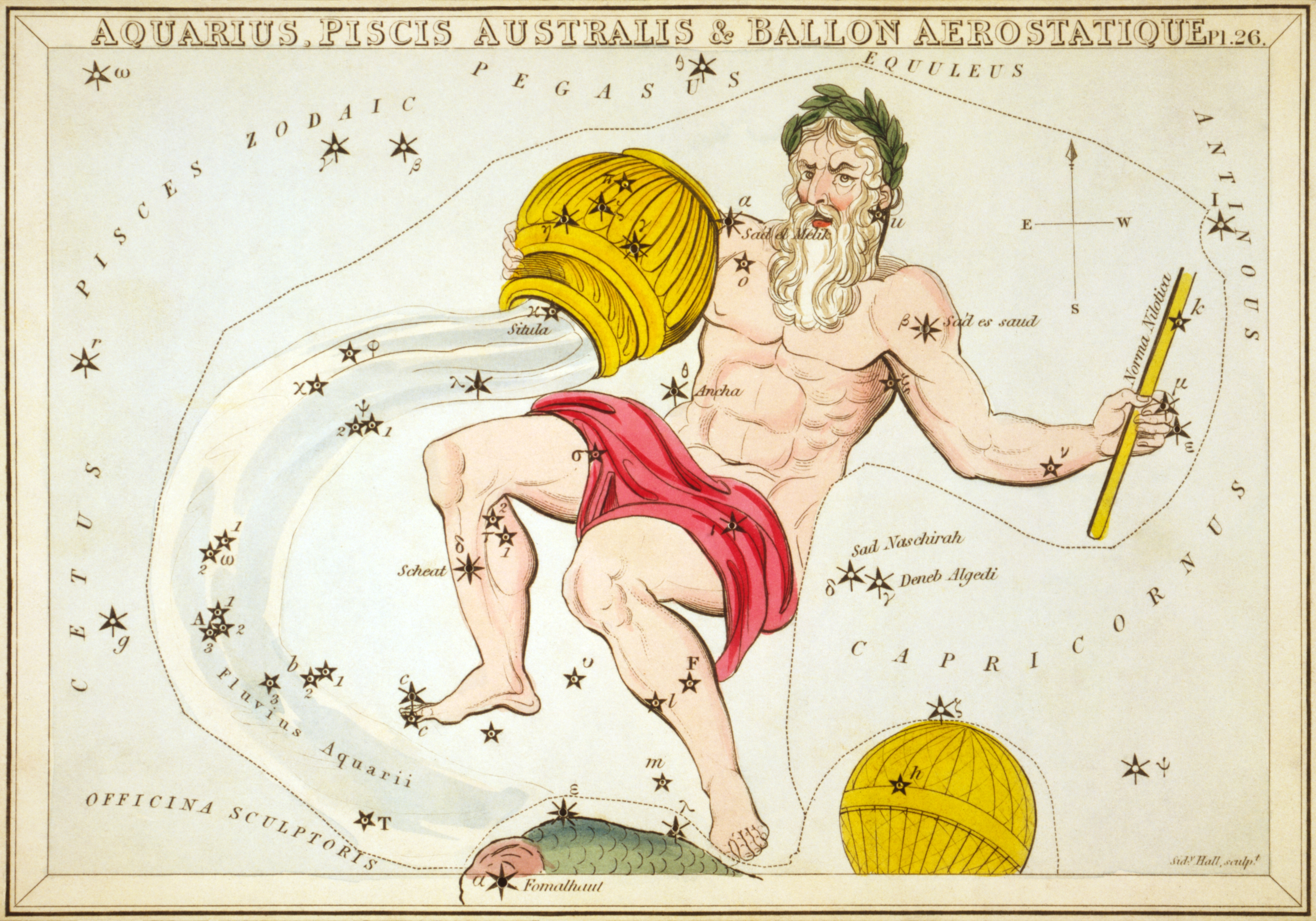
Ballon Aerostatique can be seen, in part, at the bottom right of this 1825 star chart from Urania's Mirror.

Globus Aerostaticus (Latin for hot air balloon) or Ballon Aerostatique (the French equivalent) was a constellation created by Jérôme Lalande in 1798. It lay between the constellations Piscis Austrinus, Capricornus and Microscopium. It is no longer in use.

The constellation was created to honor the invention of the Montgolfier brothers, who launched the first hot air balloon in the late eighteenth century.

== Stars ==
Although none of these stars were designated by Johann Bayer, Flamsteed did designate 6 stars in the area as part of Piscis Austrinus. Johann Bode gave the area Bayer designations from a to n, though after Globus Aerostaticus was considered obsolete, these designations were no longer used.

In 2026, the IAU Working Group on Star Names adopted the name Aerostaticus for ε Microscopii, after the obsolete constellation.

Below is a table of stars with the corresponding designations.

Name	B
ε Mic	a
8 PsA	b
5 PsA	c
3 PsA	d
6 PsA	e
7 PsA	f
HD 202287	g
41 Cap	h
HD 202940	i
HD 202941	k
HD 206291	l
HD 205905	m
HD 202773	n

== See also ==
- Former constellations
