= NGC 6925 =

Spiral galaxy in the constellation Microscopium

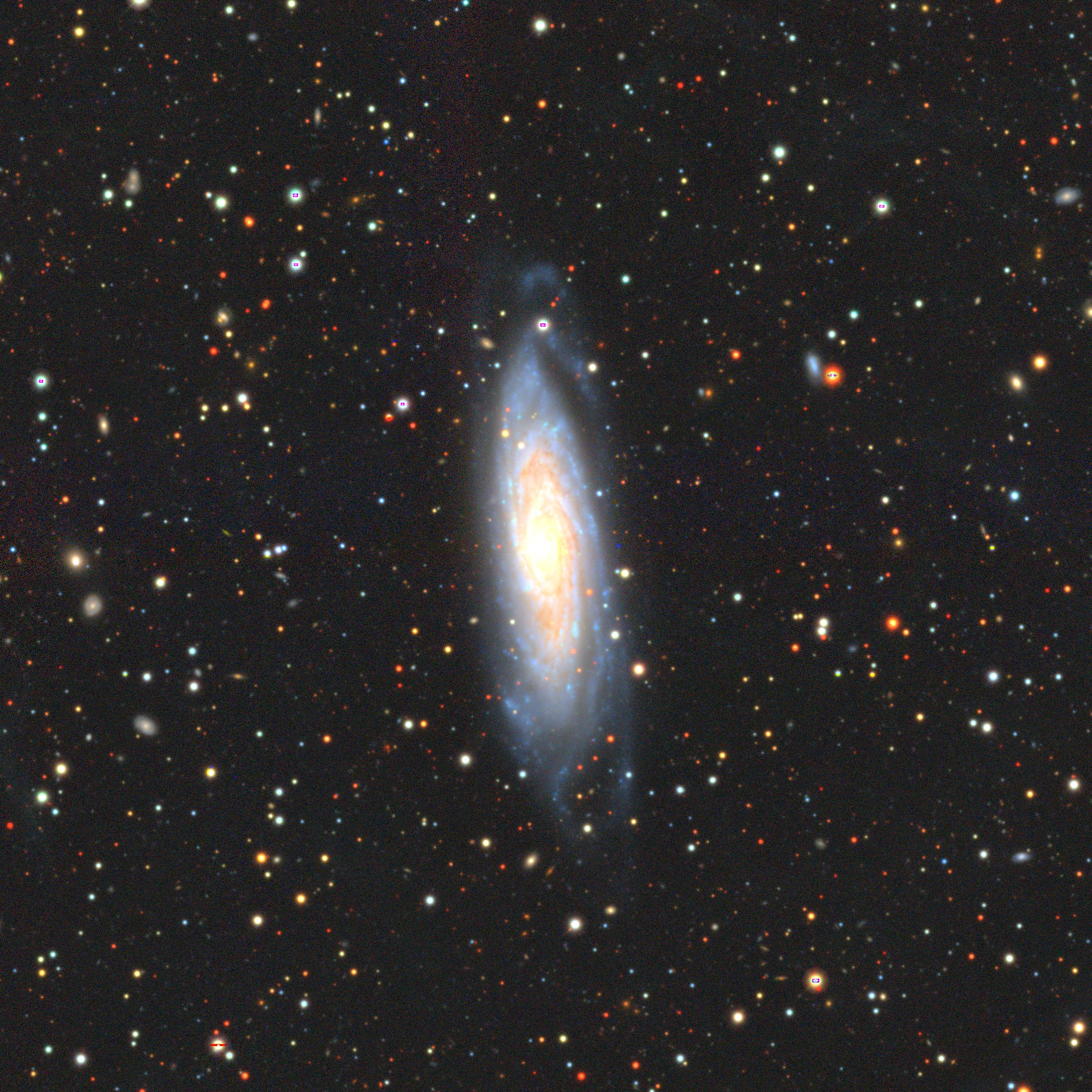
- NGC 6925 imaged by Legacy Surveys

Observation data (J2000 epoch)
- Constellation: Microscopium
- Right ascension: 20^{h} 34^{m} 20.5638^{s}
- Declination: −31° 58′ 50.965″
- Redshift: 0.009303±0.00000500
- Heliocentric radial velocity: 2,789±1 km/s
- Distance: 92.94 ± 2.66 ± 13.57 Mly (28.497 ± 0.817 ± 4.162 Mpc)
- Group or cluster: NGC 6925 group (LGG 437)
- Apparent magnitude (V): 11.3
- Apparent magnitude (B): 12.09

Characteristics
- Type: SA(s)bc
- Size: ~163,600 ly (50.16 kpc) (estimated)
- Apparent size (V): 3.100′ × 1.116′

Other designations
- ESO 463- G 004, IRAS 20312-3209, 2MASX J20342056-3158512, IC 5015, MCG -05-48-022, PGC 64980

NGC 6925 is an unbarred spiral galaxy in the constellation Microscopium. Its velocity with respect to the cosmic microwave background is 2,572±15 km/s, which corresponds to a Hubble distance of 123.7 ± 8.7 Mly (37.93 ± 2.66 Mpc). However, 34 non-redshift measurements give a much closer mean distance of 92.94 ± 2.66 Mly (28.497 ± 0.817 Mpc). It was discovered by British astronomer John Herschel on 31 July 1834.

NGC 6925 is lens-shaped, as it lies almost edge on to observers on Earth. It lies 3.7 degrees west-northwest of Alpha Microscopii.

== NGC 6925 group ==
NGC 6925 is the main galaxy in a group of galaxies that bears its name. The NGC 6925 group (also known as LGG 437) has at least four galaxies, including NGC 6923, IC 5020 and ESO 462-31.

== Supernova ==
One supernova has been observed in NGC 6925. SN 2011ei (Type IIb, mag. 18) was discovered by Stuart Parker in New Zealand on 25 July 2011.
