= NGC 6919 =

Galaxy in the constellation Microscopium

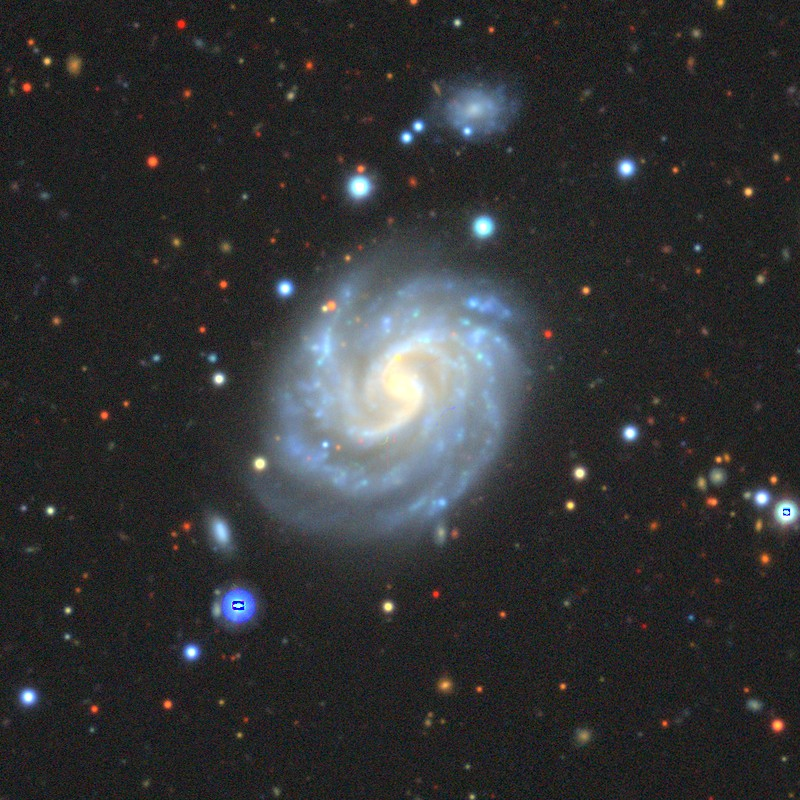
- NGC 6919 imaged by Legacy Surveys

Observation data (J2000 epoch)
- Constellation: Microscopium
- Right ascension: 20^{h} 31^{m} 38.0818^{s}
- Declination: −44° 12′ 58.881″
- Redshift: 0.022109±0.0000270
- Heliocentric radial velocity: 6,628±8 km/s
- Distance: 246.36 ± 8.67 Mly (75.533 ± 2.658 Mpc)
- Group or cluster: [CHM2007] LDC 1408
- Apparent magnitude (V): 13.58

Characteristics
- Type: SAB(s)c
- Size: ~150,500 ly (46.14 kpc) (estimated)
- Apparent size (V): 1.7′ × 1.2′

Other designations
- ESO 285- G 027, IRAS 20282-4423, 2MASX J20313813-4412592, MCG -07-42-011, PGC 64883

NGC 6919 is an intermediate spiral galaxy in the constellation of Microscopium. Its velocity with respect to the cosmic microwave background is 6,458±14 km/s, which corresponds to a Hubble distance of 310.7 ± 21.8 Mly (95.25 ± 6.67 Mpc). However, 12 non-redshift measurements give a closer mean distance of 246.36 ± 8.67 Mly (75.533 ± 2.658 Mpc). It was discovered by British astronomer John Herschel on 2 September 1836.

NGC 6919 has a possible active galactic nucleus, i.e. it has a compact region at the center of a galaxy that emits a significant amount of energy across the electromagnetic spectrum, with characteristics indicating that this luminosity is not produced by the stars.

== LDC 1408 Group ==
NGC 6919 is a member of a small group of galaxies known as [CHM2007] LDC 1408. The other four galaxies in the group are ESO 285-31, ESO 285-32, ESO 285-40, and ESO 285-42.

== Supernova ==
One supernova has been observed in NGC 6919:

- SN 2025ezt (Type II, mag. 18.144) was discovered by ATLAS on 20 March 2025.

== See also ==
- List of NGC objects (6001–7000)
