= DD Microscopii =

Star in the constellation Microscopium

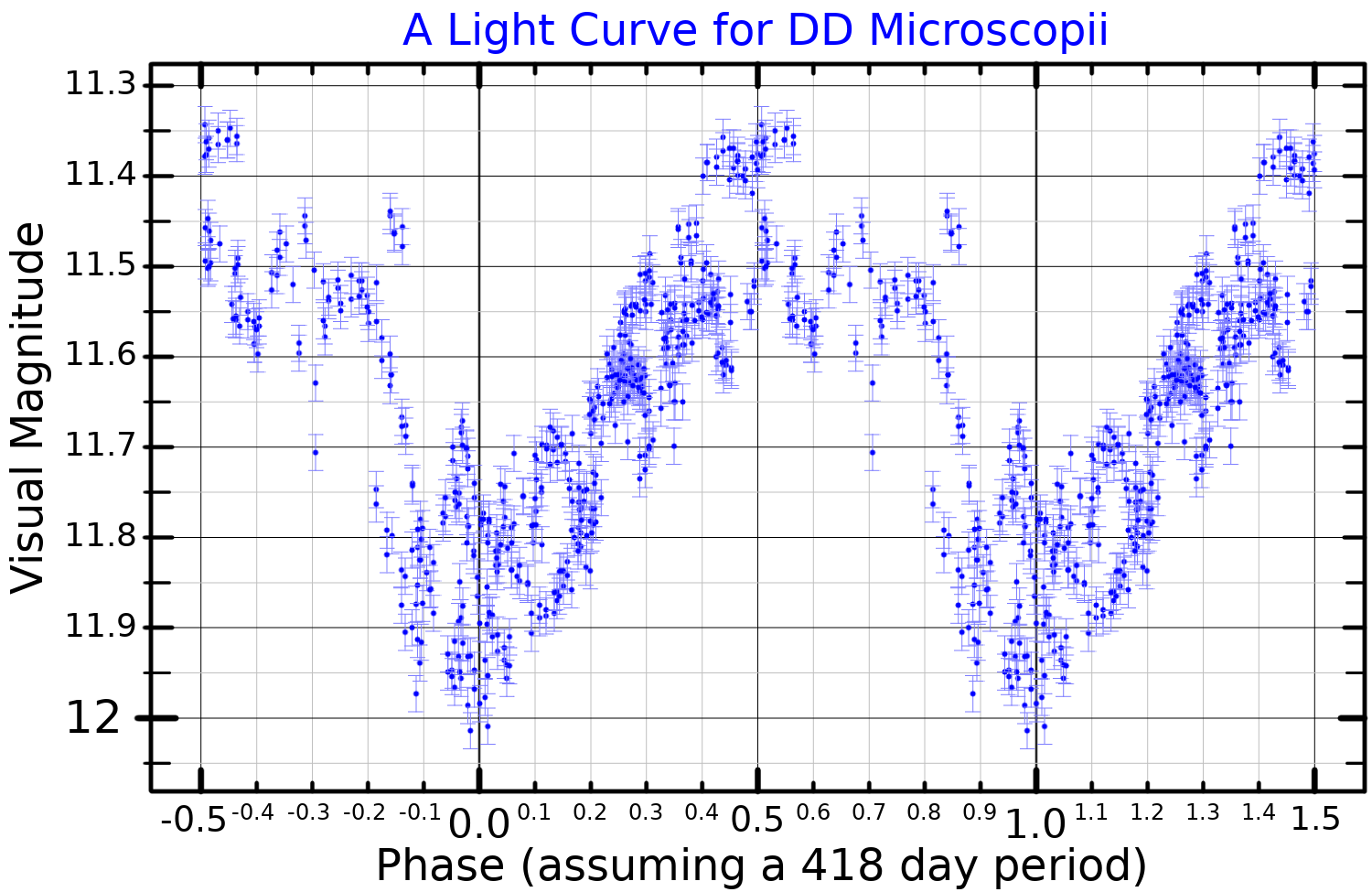
- A visual band light curve for DD Microscopii, plotted from ASAS-SN data

Observation data Epoch J2000.0 Equinox ICRS
- Constellation: Microscopium
- Right ascension: 21^{h} 00^{m} 06.3576^{s}
- Declination: −42° 38′ 44.9350″
- Apparent magnitude (V): 11.0 - 11.7

Characteristics
- Spectral type: K2 III or K5/M0 IIIe
- U−B color index: +0.37
- B−V color index: +1.57
- Variable type: Z And

Astrometry
Proper motion (μ)	RA: −10.080 mas/yr Dec.: −2.035 mas/yr
Parallax (π)	0.1072±0.0205 mas
Distance	1,000–2,000 pc

Orbit
Primary	yellow giant
Name	White dwarf
Period (P)	1,442 d
Eccentricity (e)	0.22
Periastron epoch (T)	2,445,560
Argument of periastron (ω) (primary)	261°
Semi-amplitude (K_{1}) (primary)	4.6 km/s

Details

yellow giant
Mass	1.45 M_{☉}
Radius	103 R_{☉}
Surface gravity (log g)	0.25 cgs
Temperature	3,941 K
Metallicity [Fe/H]	−0.93±0.06 dex
Rotational velocity (v sin i)	<3 km/s

Other designations
- DD Mic, CD−43°14304, GSC 07973-00869

Database references
SIMBAD	data

DD Microscopii, also known as CD−43°14304, is a binary star system in the constellation Microscopium. The system has a combined average apparent magnitude around 11, making it readily visible in telescopes but not to the naked eye. It is thought to be at a distance of one or two thousand parsecs, although parallax measurements place the system at a distance of around 30,000 light years.

It is a symbiotic star system composed of an orange giant with a class of either K2 III or K5/M0 IIIe. Both stellar classifications of the primary indicate a red giant, but one has a regular spectrum while the other shows an evolved star with the characteristics of a K5 and M0 giant star plus emission lines in its spectrum. The secondary is a white dwarf in close orbit, ionizing the stellar wind of the larger star. The giant star and white dwarf both take about 4 years to orbit each other.

The primary has an enlarged radius of 103 R_{☉} and an effective temperature of 3,941 K, giving a red hue when viewed through a telescope. DD Microscopii is extremely metal deficient, with an iron abundance only 12% of the Sun, and spins leisurely with a projected rotational velocity lower than 3 km/s. The star system has its origin in the galactic halo of the Milky Way as indicated by the high galactic latitude. DD Microscopii is cataloged as a Z Andromedae variable, a type of symbiotic binary with occasional outbursts. It fluctuates between magnitudes 11.0 and 11.7 over a span of almost 400 days.
