= T Microscopii =

Variable star in the constellation Microscopium

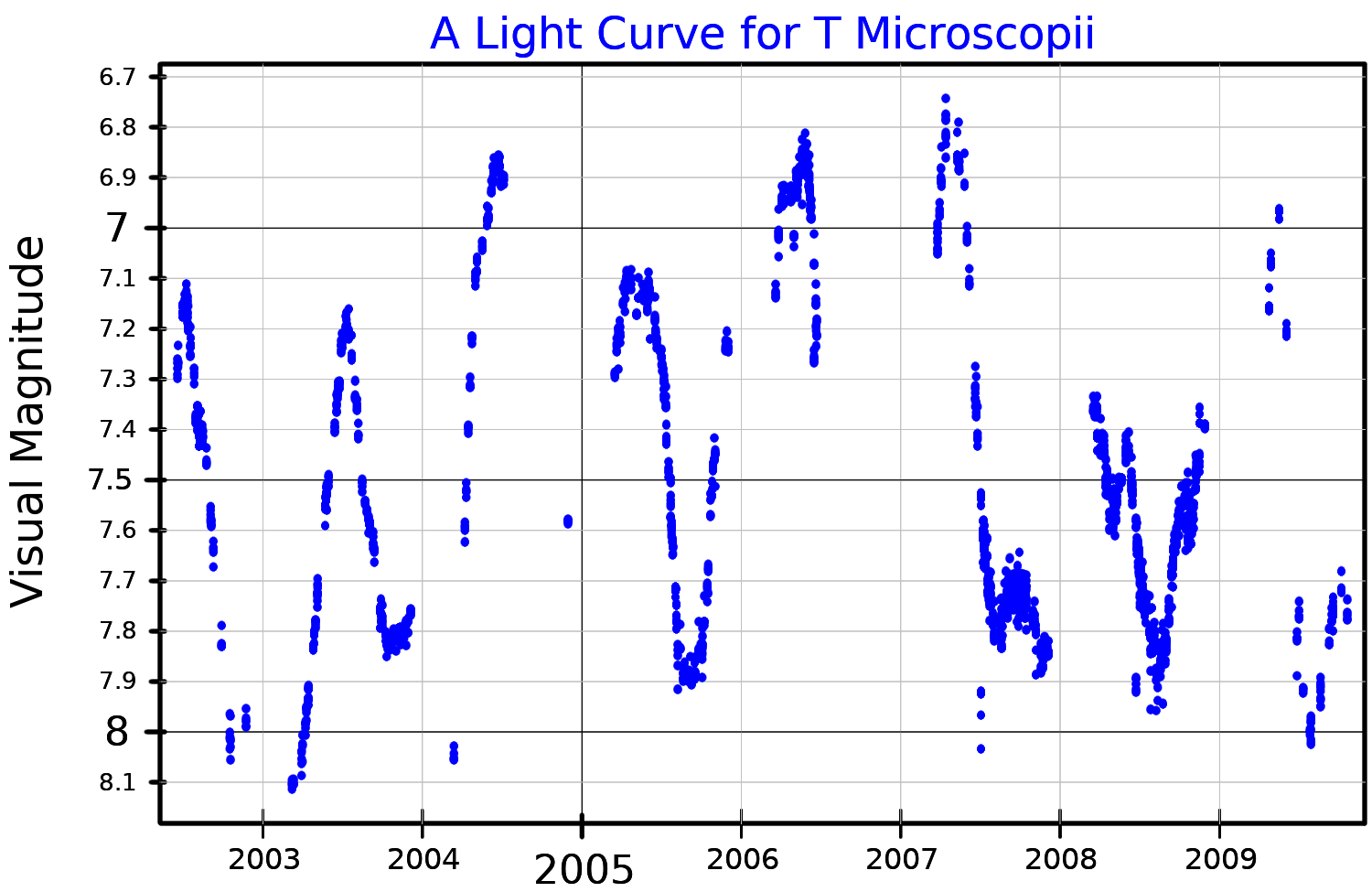
- A visual band light curve of T Microscopii, plotted from ASAS data

Observation data Epoch J2000 Equinox ICRS
- Constellation: Microscopium
- Right ascension: 20^{h} 27^{m} 55.18840^{s}
- Declination: −28° 15′ 39.8035″
- Apparent magnitude (V): 6.74 - 8.11

Characteristics
- Evolutionary stage: AGB
- Spectral type: M6-M8IIIe
- Variable type: SRb

Astrometry
Proper motion (μ)	RA: −4.682±0.594 mas/yr Dec.: 12.562±0.433 mas/yr
Parallax (π)	5.1811±0.3864 mas
Distance	630 ± 50 ly (190 ± 10 pc)

Details
Radius	382 R_{☉}
Luminosity	7,509 L_{☉}
Surface gravity (log g)	−0.427 cgs
Temperature	2,750 K

Other designations
- T Microscopii, HIP 100935, HD 194676, SAO 189308, CD−28°16682

Database references
SIMBAD	data

T Microscopii is a semiregular variable star in the constellation Microscopium. It ranges from magnitude 6.74 to 8.11 over a period of 352 days. Located around 700 light-years distant, it shines with a bolometric luminosity 7,509 times that of the Sun and has a surface temperature of 2,750 K.

In 1896 it was announced that Williamina Fleming had discovered that the star is a variable star, based on photographs taken from 1888 through 1895. It was listed with its variable star designation, T Microscopii, in Annie Jump Cannon's 1907 work Second Catalog of Variable Stars.
