= HD 202628 =

G-type star in the constellation Microscopium with a circumstellar disk

- Image of the disk from the REASONS survey

Observation data Epoch J2000 Equinox ICRS
- Constellation: Microscopium
- Right ascension: 21^{h} 18^{m} 27.26962^{s}
- Declination: −43° 20′ 04.7431″
- Apparent magnitude (V): +6.742±0.004

Characteristics
- Evolutionary stage: main sequence
- Spectral type: G1.5V
- B−V color index: +0.637±0.001

Astrometry
Radial velocity (R_{v})	+12.071±0.0027 km/s
Proper motion (μ)	RA: +241.978 mas/yr Dec.: +21.425 mas/yr
Parallax (π)	42.0274±0.0210 mas
Distance	77.61 ± 0.04 ly (23.79 ± 0.01 pc)
Absolute magnitude (M_{V})	4.856±0.005

Details
Mass	1.068±0.038 M_{☉}
Radius	0.951±0.013 R_{☉}
Luminosity	0.951±0.026 L_{☉}
Surface gravity (log g)	4.510±0.011 cgs
Temperature	5,843±6 K
Metallicity [Fe/H]	0.003±0.004 dex
Rotational velocity (v sin i)	2.64±0.11 km/s
Age	1.1±0.4 Gyr; 2.3±1 Gyr

Other designations
- CD−43°14464, GJ 825.2 & 9730, HD 202628, HIP 105184, SAO 230622, LTT 8444

Database references
SIMBAD	data
Exoplanet Archive	data

HD 202628 is a single star in the southern constellation of Microscopium. It has an apparent visual magnitude of +6.7, which makes it too faint to be readily visible to the naked eye. The star is located at a distance of 77.6 light years from the Sun based on parallax, and it is drifting further away with a radial velocity of +12.1 km/s. The absolute magnitude of this star is 4.86.

The stellar classification of HD 202628 is G1.5V, matching a yellow-hued G-type main-sequence star similar to the Sun. The chromospheric activity level and amount of X-ray emission is consistent with a star that is younger than the Sun. It is spinning with a projected rotational velocity of 2.6 km/s. The star has 107% of the mass of the Sun and 95% of the Sun's radius. The metallicity, or abundance of heavier elements, appears to be about the same as in the Sun. It is radiating 95% of the luminosity of the Sun from its photosphere at an effective temperature of 5,843 K.

In 2010, an infrared excess from a circumstellar disk of dust was detected around this star by the Spitzer Space Telescope. The net emission at 70 microns (70 μm) is almost 20 times as high as the star's flux at this wavelength. The disk has been directly imaged by the Hubble Space Telescope. It is oval-shaped with an orbital eccentricity of 0.18, and is inclined at 64° to the line of sight from the Earth. The inner edge of the ring, which lies at around 158 AU from the star, is sharply defined. This suggests that there is an exoplanet responsible for this defined edge, and it has been calculated as orbiting between 86 and 158 AU from HD 202628.

The HD 202628 planetary system
Companion (in order from star)	Mass	Semimajor axis (AU)	Orbital period (years)	Eccentricity	Inclination (°)	Radius
b (unconfirmed)	> 1 M_{🜨}	86-158	—	~ 0.2	—	—
Disk	150–220 AU				64°°	—
