= WASP-7 =

Star in the constellation Microscopium

Observation data Epoch J2000 Equinox ICRS
- Constellation: Microscopium
- Right ascension: 20^{h} 44^{m} 10.2208^{s}
- Declination: −39° 13′ 30.856″
- Apparent magnitude (V): 9.50

Characteristics
- Evolutionary stage: main sequence
- Spectral type: F5V
- Apparent magnitude (B): ~9.96
- Apparent magnitude (V): ~9.54
- Apparent magnitude (J): 8.648 ± 0.027
- Apparent magnitude (H): 8.414 ± 0.042
- Apparent magnitude (K): 8.396 ± 0.023

Astrometry
Radial velocity (R_{v})	−29.09±0.20 km/s
Proper motion (μ)	RA: 30.394 mas/yr Dec.: −57.587 mas/yr
Parallax (π)	6.1902±0.0176 mas
Distance	527 ± 1 ly (161.5 ± 0.5 pc)

Details
Mass	1.285±0.063 M_{☉}
Radius	1.466±0.094 R_{☉}
Temperature	6520±70 K
Metallicity [Fe/H]	0.00±0.10 dex
Rotational velocity (v sin i)	17.0±2.0 km/s
Age	2.5+0.8 −0.9 Gyr

Other designations
- CD−39 13941, CPD−39 8759, HD 197286, PPM 300547, TOI-2197, TIC 389352124, WASP-7, TYC 7963-1570-1, GSC 07963-01570, 2MASS J20441022-3913309, CPC 18 10732

Database references
SIMBAD	data
Exoplanet Archive	data

WASP-7, also identified as HD 197286, is a type F star located about 527 light-years away in the constellation Microscopium. This star is a little larger and about 28% more massive than the Sun and is also brighter and hotter. At magnitude 9.5 the star cannot be seen by the naked eye but is visible through a small telescope.

== Planetary system ==
The SuperWASP project announced an extrasolar planet, WASP-7b, orbiting this star in 2008. The planet appears to be another hot Jupiter, a low-density planet with Jupiter's mass orbiting very close to a hot star and thus emitting enough heat to glow.

The WASP-7 planetary system
Companion (in order from star)	Mass	Semimajor axis (AU)	Orbital period (days)	Eccentricity	Inclination (°)	Radius
b	1.083+0.093 −0.088 M_{J}	0.06188+0.00098 −0.0010	4.9546416(35)	<0.049	87.03±0.93	1.363±0.093 R_{J}
