= Nu Microscopii =

Star in the constellation Microscopium

ν Microscopii
- Location of ν Microscopii (circled in red)

Observation data Epoch J2000.0 Equinox J2000.0 (ICRS)
- Constellation: Microscopium
- Right ascension: 20^{h} 33^{m} 55.07257^{s}
- Declination: −44° 30′ 57.7642″
- Apparent magnitude (V): 5.12

Characteristics
- Evolutionary stage: red giant branch
- Spectral type: K0 III
- U−B color index: +1.009
- B−V color index: +0.999±0.002

Astrometry
Radial velocity (R_{v})	8.7±2 km/s
Proper motion (μ)	RA: +11.560 mas/yr Dec.: −35.355 mas/yr
Parallax (π)	12.9361±0.0955 mas
Distance	252 ± 2 ly (77.3 ± 0.6 pc)
Absolute magnitude (M_{V})	+0.84

Details
Mass	2.46 M_{☉}
Radius	11 R_{☉}
Luminosity	59 L_{☉}
Surface gravity (log g)	2.78 cgs
Temperature	4,832 K
Metallicity [Fe/H]	+0.05±0.10 dex
Rotational velocity (v sin i)	2.02 km/s
Age	377 Myr

Other designations
- ν Mic, ν Ind, CD−44°14020, FK5 3643, HD 195569, HIP 101477, HR 7846, SAO 230276

Database references
SIMBAD	data

ν Microscopii, Latinized as Nu Microscopii, is a star in the constellation Microscopium. It is an orange-hued star that is visible to the naked eye as a faint point of light with an apparent visual magnitude of 5.12. It is located at a distance of around 252 light-years from the Sun, based on parallax, and is drifting further away with a radial velocity of about +9 km/s.

ν Microscopii is an aging giant star with a stellar classification of K0 III. It has expanded to 11 times the girth of the Sun after exhausting the supply of hydrogen at its core and evolving off the main sequence. The star has 2.46 times the mass of the Sun. It is radiating 59 times the Sun's luminosity from its swollen photosphere at an effective temperature of 4,832 K.

ν Microscopii was first catalogued as Nu Indi by the French explorer and astronomer Nicolas Louis de Lacaille in 1756, before being reclassified in Microscopium and given its current Bayer designation of Nu Microscopii by Gould. Despite this, most recent studies and the SIMBAD database use the designation Nu Indi for the star HD 211998.
