= Lacaille 8760 =

Star in the constellation Microscopium

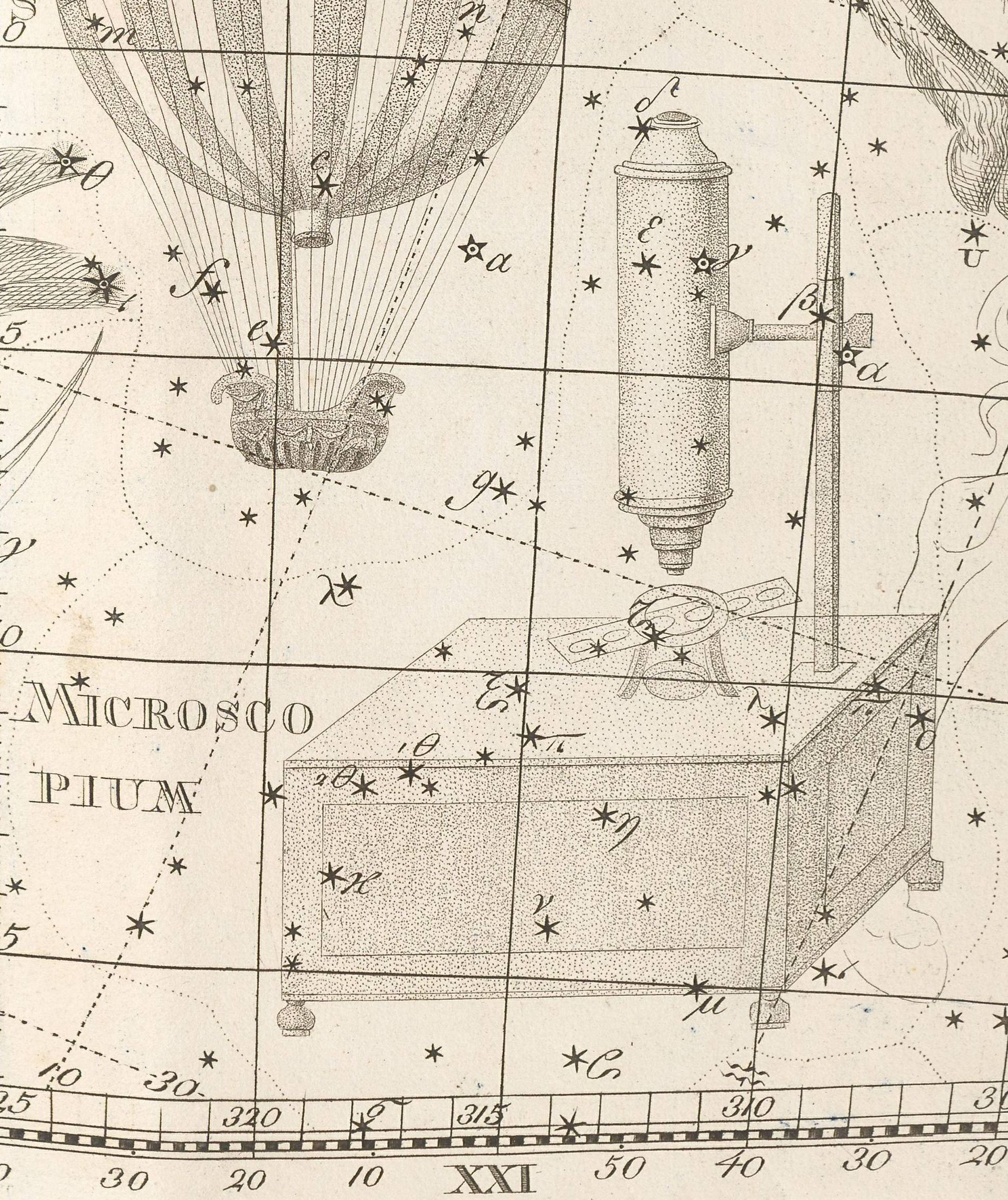
- Image of Lacaille 8760 (circled) in Bode's Uranographia (1801). In the corresponding catalog this star is listed as № 36 in constellation Microscopium.

Observation data Epoch J2000 Equinox ICRS
- Constellation: Microscopium
- Right ascension: 21^{h} 17^{m} 15.26907^{s}
- Declination: −38° 52′ 02.5039″
- Apparent magnitude (V): 6.67

Characteristics
- Spectral type: M0Ve
- U−B color index: +1.165
- B−V color index: +1.395
- Variable type: Flare star

Astrometry
| Radial velocity (R_{v}) | +20.71±0.12 km/s |
| Proper motion (μ) | RA: −3,258.966 mas/yr Dec.: −1,145.862 mas/yr |
| Parallax (π) | 251.9124±0.0352 mas |
| Distance | 12.947 ± 0.002 ly (3.9696 ± 0.0006 pc) |
| Absolute magnitude (M_{V}) | 8.69 |

Details
| Mass | 0.60 M_{☉} |
| Radius | 0.51 R_{☉} |
| Luminosity (bolometric) | 0.072 L_{☉} |
| Luminosity (visual, L_{V}) | 0.029 L_{☉} |
| Surface gravity (log g) | 4.78 cgs |
| Temperature | 3,800 K |
| Metallicity [Fe/H] | −0.01±0.04 dex |
| Rotational velocity (v sin i) | 3.3 km/s |
| Age | 4.8±2.9 Gyr |

Other designations
- AX Microscopii, AX Mic, CD−39°14192, GJ 825, HD 202560, HIP 105090, LHS 66

Database references
| SIMBAD | data |
| Exoplanet Archive | data |
| ARICNS | data |
- Location of Lacaille 8760 in the constellation Microscopium

Lacaille 8760 (AX Microscopii) is a red dwarf star in the constellation Microscopium. It is one of the nearest stars to the Sun at about 12.9 light-years' distance, and the brightest M-class main-sequence star in Earth's night sky, although it is generally too faint to be seen without a telescope. At an apparent magnitude of +6.7, it may only be visible to the unaided eye under exceptionally good viewing conditions, under dark skies.

This star was originally listed in a 1763 catalog that was published posthumously by the French Abbé Nicolas-Louis de Lacaille. He observed it in the southern sky while working from an observatory at the Cape of Good Hope. Number 8760 was assigned to this star in the 1847 edition of Lacaille's catalogue of 9,766 stars by Francis Baily.

In the past, Lacaille 8760 has been classified anywhere from spectral class K7 down to M2. In 1979, the Irish astronomer Patrick Byrne discovered that it is a flare star, and it was given the variable star designation AX Microscopii, or AX Mic. As a flare star it is relatively quiescent.

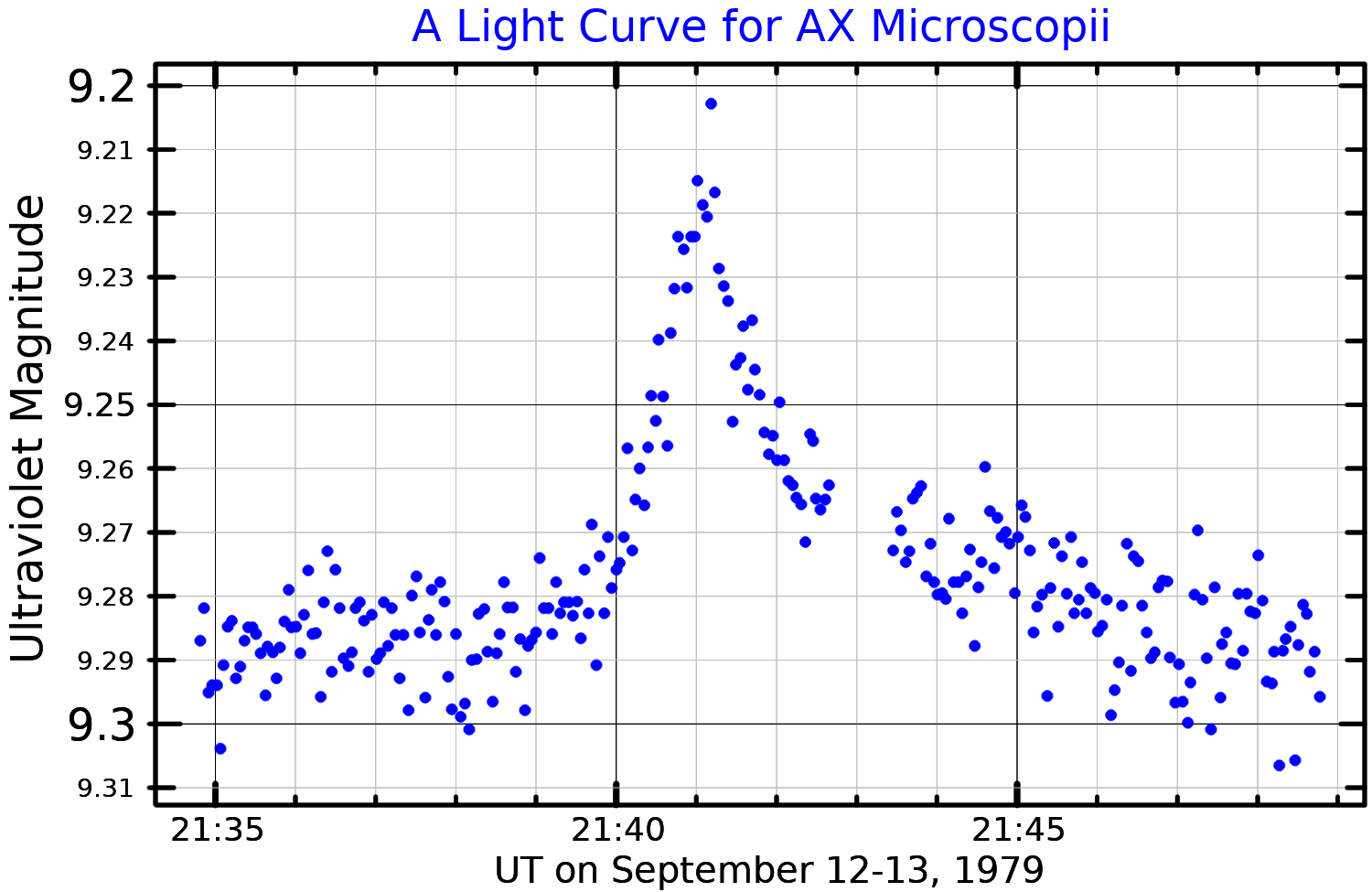
An ultraviolet band light curve for a flare on AX Microscopii, adapted from Byrne (1981)

Lacaille 8760 is one of the largest and brightest red dwarfs known, with about 60% the mass and 51% the radius of the Sun. It is about five billion years old and is spinning at a projected rotational velocity of 3.3 km/s. The star is radiating 7.2% of the luminosity of the Sun from its photosphere at an effective temperature of 3,800 K.

Despite efforts by astronomers, as of 2011 no planets had been detected in orbit around this star.

Lacaille 8760 orbits around the galaxy with a relatively high ellipticity of 0.23. Its closest approach to the Sun occurred about 20,000 years ago when it came within 12 light-years (3.7 parsecs). Due to its low mass (60% of the Sun), it has an expected lifespan of about 75 billion (7.5 × 10^{10}) years, seven times longer than the Sun's.
