= U Microscopii =

Star in the constellation Microscopium

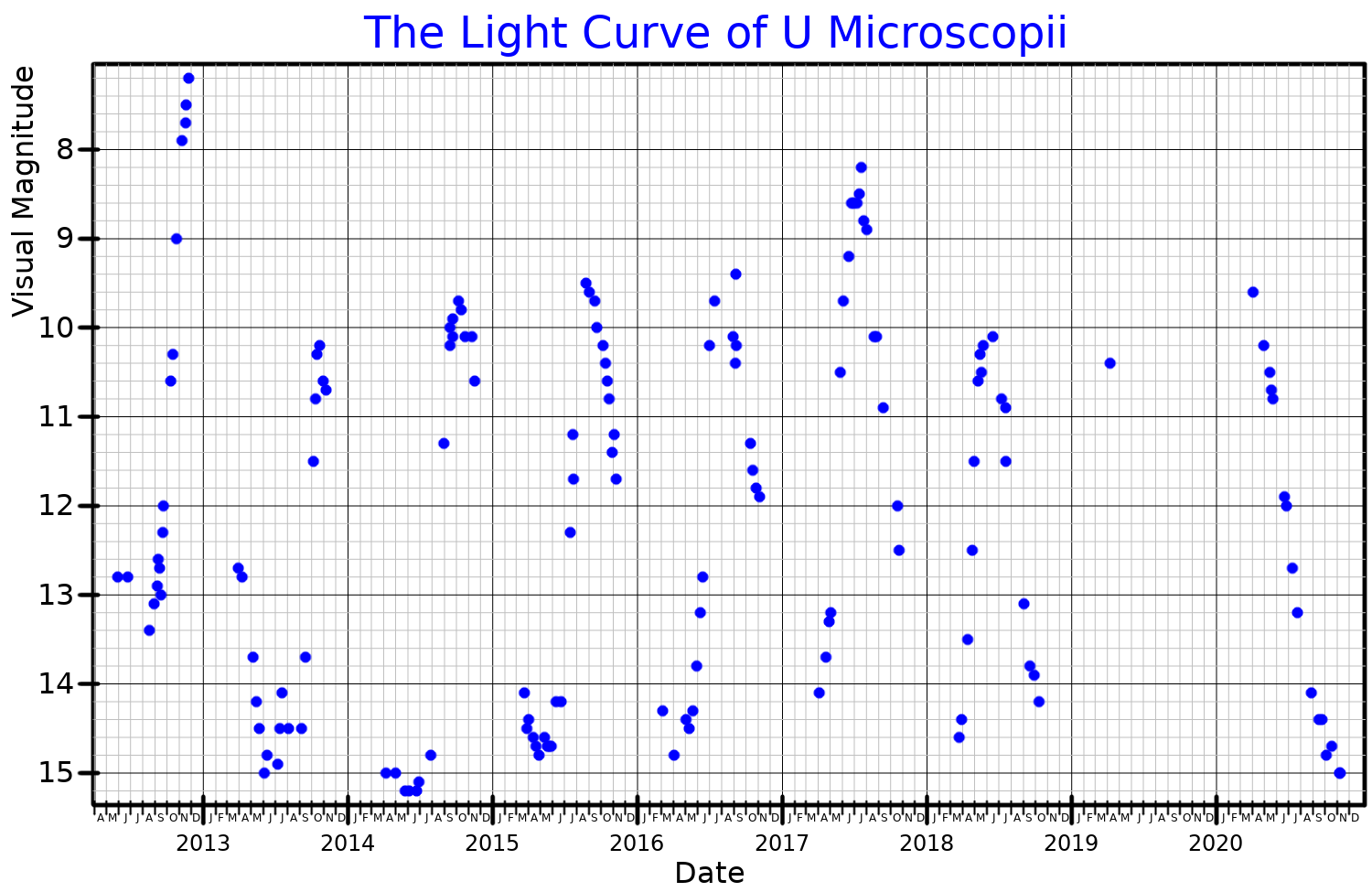
- The visual band light curve of U Microscopii, from AAVSO data

Observation data Epoch J2000 Equinox J2000
- Constellation: Microscopium
- Right ascension: 20^{h} 29^{m} 15.77460^{s}
- Declination: −40° 25′ 01.3084″
- Apparent magnitude (V): 7.0 - 14.4

Characteristics
- Evolutionary stage: AGB
- Spectral type: M5e-M7e
- Variable type: Mira

Astrometry
Radial velocity (R_{v})	−54.00 km/s
Proper motion (μ)	RA: −13.68 mas/yr Dec.: −24.38 mas/yr
Parallax (π)	1.5546±0.1456 mas
Distance	2,100 ± 200 ly (640 ± 60 pc)

Details
Luminosity	7,900 L_{☉}
Temperature	2,995 K

Other designations
- U Microscopii, HIP 101063, HD 194814, CD−40°13888

Database references
SIMBAD	data

U Microscopii is a Mira variable star in the constellation Microscopium. It ranges from magnitude 7 to 14.4 over a period of 334 days. The Astronomical Society of Southern Africa in 2003 reported that observations of U Microscopii were very urgently needed as data on its light curve was incomplete.
