= S Microscopii =

Variable star in the constellation Microscopium

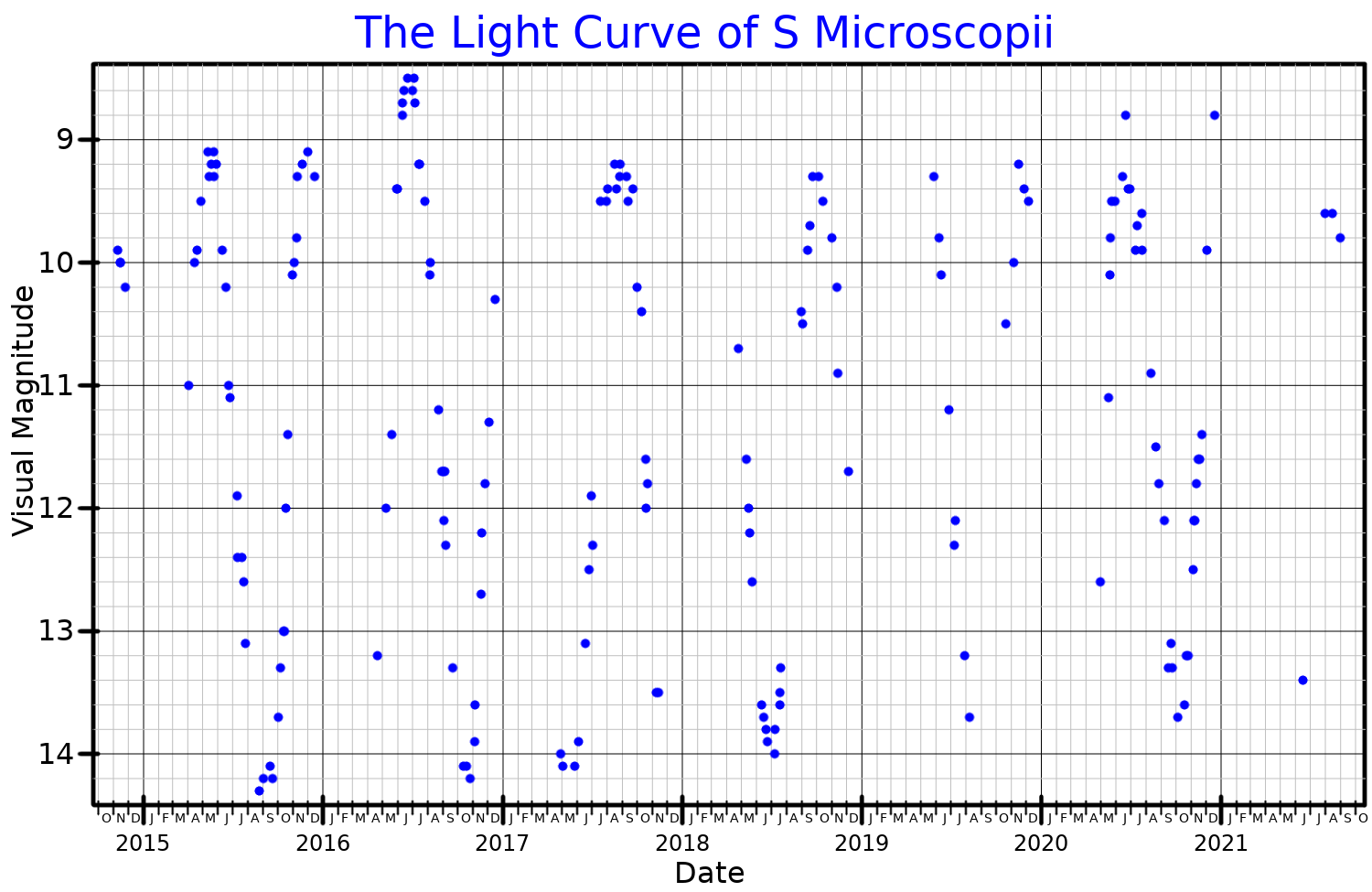
- The visual band light curve of S Microscopii, from AAVSO data

Observation data Epoch J2000.0 Equinox J2000.0 (ICRS)
- Constellation: Microscopium
- Right ascension: 21^{h} 26^{m} 44.1040^{s}
- Declination: −29° 51′ 04.680″
- Apparent magnitude (V): 7.8 - 14.8

Characteristics
- Spectral type: M3e-M5.5

Astrometry
Parallax (π)	0.5137±0.1623 mas
Distance	approx. 6,000 ly (approx. 1,900 pc)

Other designations
- S Microscopii, CD−30° 18609, HD 204045

Database references
SIMBAD	data

S Microscopii is a star in the constellation Microscopium. It is a red giant star of spectral type M3e-M5.5 that is also a Mira variable, with an apparent magnitude ranging between 7.4 and 14.8 over 210 days. The Astronomical Society of Southern Africa in 2003 reported that observations of S Microscopii were very urgently needed as data on its light curve was incomplete.
