= Eta Microscopii =

Star in the constellation Microscopium

- Location of η Microscopii (circled)

Observation data Epoch J2000.0 Equinox J2000.0 (ICRS)
- Constellation: Microscopium
- Right ascension: 21^{h} 06^{m} 25.51950^{s}
- Declination: −41° 23′ 09.4805″
- Apparent magnitude (V): 5.53

Characteristics
- Spectral type: K3 III
- U−B color index: +1.50
- B−V color index: +1.35

Astrometry
Radial velocity (R_{v})	+22.29±0.13 km/s
Proper motion (μ)	RA: +28.760 mas/yr Dec.: −11.548 mas/yr
Parallax (π)	3.5657±0.1149 mas
Distance	910 ± 30 ly (280 ± 9 pc)
Absolute magnitude (M_{V})	−1.13

Details
Mass	1.2 M_{☉}
Radius	47.41+0.95 −5.67 R_{☉}
Luminosity	735±28 L_{☉}
Surface gravity (log g)	1.1 cgs
Temperature	4,365+287 −43 K
Metallicity [Fe/H]	−0.31 dex

Other designations
- η Mic, CD−41°14379, FK5 3684, GC 29461, HD 200702, HIP 104177, HR 8069, SAO 230523

Database references
SIMBAD	data

Eta Microscopii, Latinised as η Microscopii, is a solitary star in the constellation Microscopium. It is visible to the naked eye as a dim, orange-hued star with an apparent visual magnitude of 5.53. The star is located around 910 light-years distant from the Sun based on parallax, and is drifting further away with a radial velocity of +22 km/s.

This is an aging giant star with a stellar classification of K3 III, indicating that it has exhausted the supply of hydrogen at its core then cooled and expanded. At present it has around 47 times the girth of the Sun. The star is radiating 735 times the luminosity of the Sun from its swollen photosphere at an effective temperature of 4,365 K.

Multiple star catalogues list two optical companions. Two arc-minutes away, the 8th magnitude HD 200733 is a main sequence star much closer to Earth than η Microscopii. A 14th-magnitude star one arc-minute from η Microscopii is a background object.
