= AT Microscopii =

Star in the constellation Microscopium

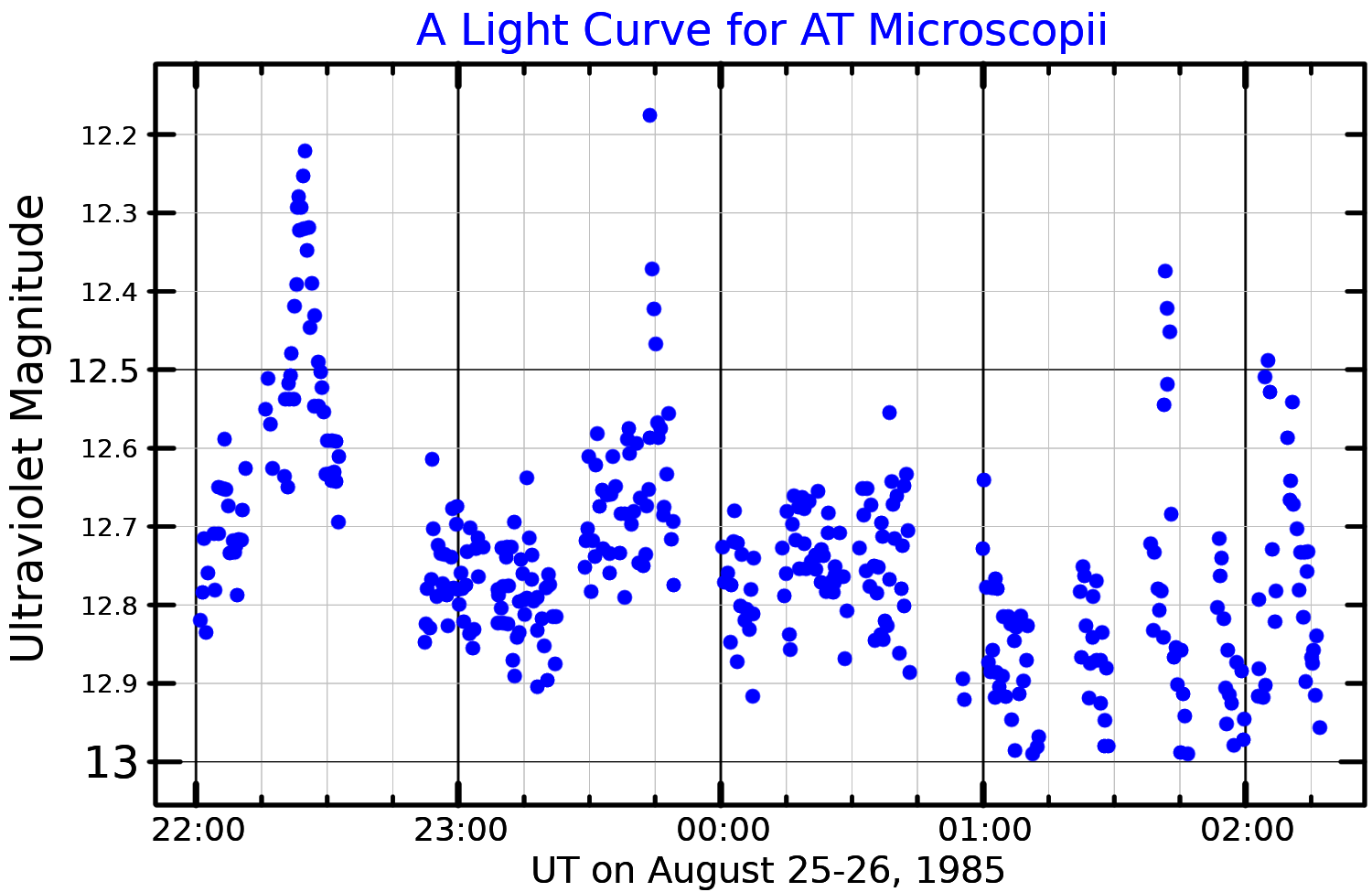
- An ultraviolet band light curve for AT Microscopii, adapted from Andrews (1990)

Observation data Epoch J2000.0 Equinox J2000.0 (ICRS)
- Constellation: Microscopium
- Right ascension: 20^{h} 41^{m} 51.15925^{s}
- Declination: −32° 26′ 06.8283″
- Apparent magnitude (V): 11.0/11.1

Characteristics
- Spectral type: M4 Ve + M4.5e
- U−B color index: +0.91
- B−V color index: +1.58
- Variable type: Flare star

Astrometry
Radial velocity (R_{v})	4.5 km/s
Proper motion (μ)	RA: +270.45 mas/yr Dec.: –365.60 mas/yr
Parallax (π)	93.50±3.67 mas
Distance	35 ± 1 ly (10.7 ± 0.4 pc)

Orbit
Period (P)	141.39 yr
Semi-major axis (a)	2.616″
Eccentricity (e)	0.607
Inclination (i)	148.4°
Longitude of the node (Ω)	82.6°
Periastron epoch (T)	2035.10
Argument of periastron (ω) (secondary)	54.6°

Details

AT Mic A
Mass	0.27+0.04 −0.09 M_{☉}
Radius	0.573±0.041 R_{☉}
Luminosity	0.0304±0.0009 L_{☉}
Temperature	3,150 K
Age	12+8 −4 Myr

AT Mic B
Mass	0.25+0.04 −0.09 M_{☉}
Radius	0.590±0.046 R_{☉}
Luminosity	0.0308±0.00085 L_{☉}
Temperature	3,150 K

Other designations
- AT Mic, CD−32°16135, GJ 799, HD 196982, HIP 102141, SAO 212355, WDS J20452-3120BC

Database references
SIMBAD	data
ARICNS	A
- B

AT Microscopii is a binary star system located at a distance of 35 ly (11 pc) from the Sun in the constellation of Microscopium. Both members are flare stars, meaning they are red dwarf stars that undergo random eruptions that increase their brightness. This pair lies physically near the red dwarf star AU Microscopii, which may mean they form a wide triple star system.

== Observational history ==
In 1926, Dutch-American astronomer Willem Jacob Luyten reported that the lines in the spectrum of this star underwent variation. A photographic plate taken on June 23, 1895, showed bright lines of hydrogen that were much weaker on a plate taken June 29, 1895. A photograph taken on July 1, 1903, showed no such lines. The net variation in brightness of the star was small, not exceeding 0.5 in magnitude. Luyten noted that the star has a large proper motion, changing its position by 0.43 seconds of arc between 1899 and 1923.

By 1927, the object was found to be a pair of stars with an angular separation of 2.95 arcseconds. Both were shown to be of 'dwarf Me' type, indicating they are red dwarfs with emission lines in their spectrum. This was the first such pair of matching dwarf Me stars to be discovered. The first parallax measurements of the pair showed an annual shift of about 0.1 arcseconds, while their radial velocity was measured to be +5 km/s away from the Sun. A nearby star HD 197981, later named AU Microscopii, was shown to have a similar radial velocity of +10 km/s. For this reason it was suggested that the three stars are physically associated.

Following the discovery in 1949 that certain types of variable stars are characterized by rapid but brief changes in brightness, accompanied by emission lines in their spectrum, in 1954 both HD 196982 A and B were listed as suspected flare stars by Czech solar physicist Zdeněk Švestka.

With the introduction of photometric instruments to astronomy, the variability of stars could now be monitored over intervals of time. Measurements of HD 196982 during 1969 showed them to be the most active flare stars known at that time: over a period of 16.31 hours, 54 flares were observed. The flares increased the combined magnitude of the pair by more than 0.05 for more than half of this observation period. By 1972, the pair had received the variable star designation AT Microscopii.

== Properties ==
Position measurements of the pair made with the Hipparcos spacecraft show an annual parallax shift of 0.0935 seconds of arc, which is equivalent to a distance of about 35 ly (11 pc) from the Sun. It is a binary star system with an angular separation of 4.0 arcseconds. Both members are pre-main sequence, red dwarf stars and are among the youngest of this type in the neighborhood of the Sun. Relative to the Sun, component A has about 27% of the mass and 3.6% of the luminosity, while component B has 25% of the mass and 3.3% of the luminosity.

Both members of this system have active stellar coronae, show luminosity variations of the BY Draconis type, and are X-ray emitters. The average flare rate for the pair is 2.8 per hour. Their X-ray spectrum is consistent with a plasma density of around 3 × 10^{10} cm^{−3} and a magnetic field strength of at least 100 G in the flare regions. Neither star shows any indication of lithium in their spectrum, having depleted this element through nuclear fusion at their cores.

This binary system is located in close proximity to the young star AU Microscopii, with a projected separation of 46,400 ± 500 astronomical units. This indicates that the three may form a wide hierarchical triple system, with the AT Microscopii pair orbiting AU Microscopii over a period of 10 million years. All three stars are candidate members of the Beta Pictoris moving group, one of the nearest associations of stars that share a common motion through space. This group averages a distance of about 100 ly (31 pc) from the Earth, but are scattered across a volume roughly 100 ly (31 pc) in diameter. Estimates for the age of this group range between 10 and 21 million years.
