= Speedy Mic =

Star in the constellation Microscopium

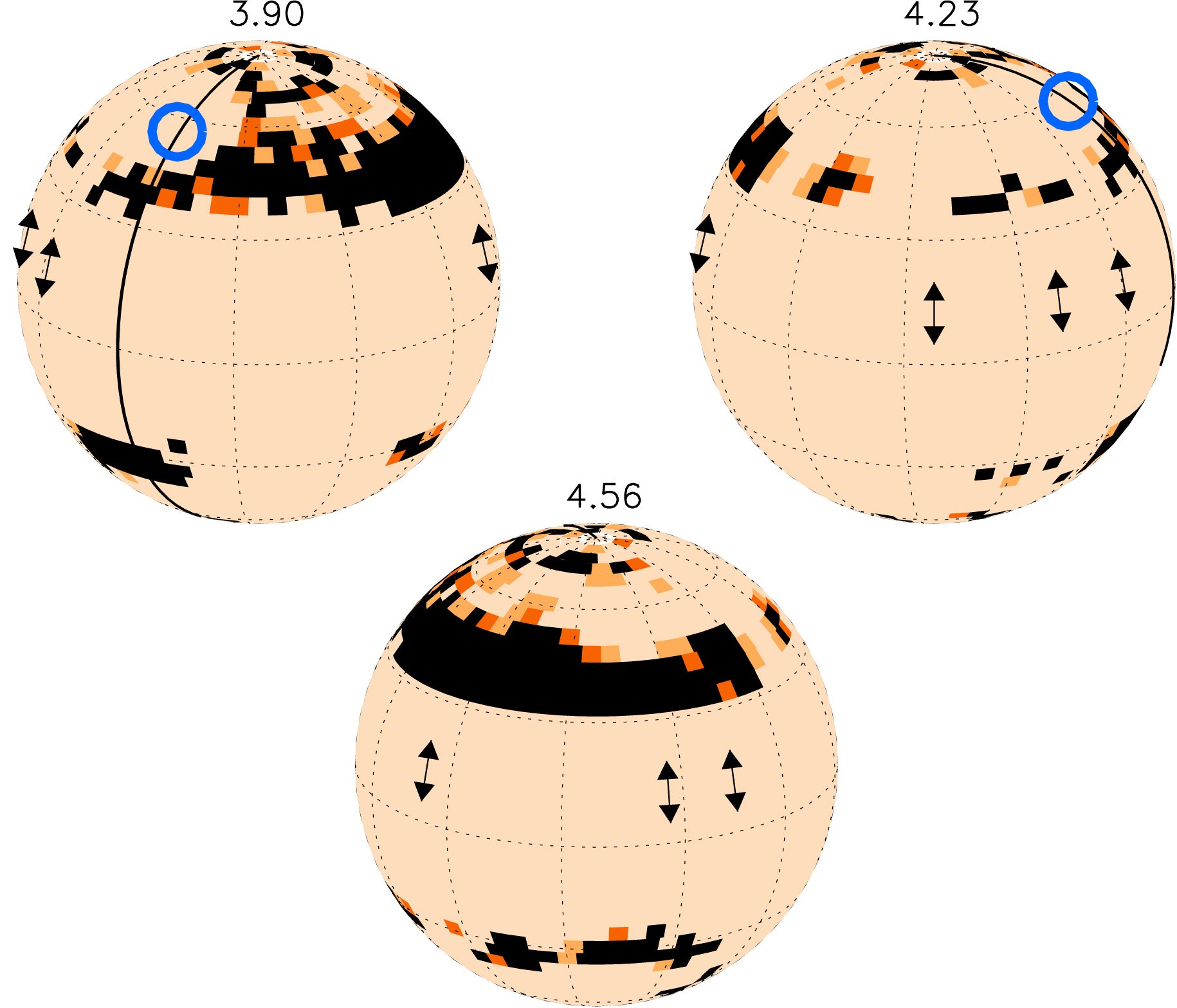
- Map of starspots on the surface of Speedy Mic at different rotation phases. The blue circle is the location of a flare observed in October 2006.

Observation data Epoch J2000 Equinox J2000
- Constellation: Microscopium
- Right ascension: 20^{h} 47^{m} 45.00562^{s}
- Declination: −36° 35′ 40.7698″
- Apparent magnitude (V): 9.39

Characteristics
- Spectral type: K3Ve
- Variable type: BY Dra

Astrometry
Radial velocity (R_{v})	−5.64±2.03 km/s
Proper motion (μ)	RA: 18.735 mas/yr Dec.: −81.712 mas/yr
Parallax (π)	19.5983±0.5745 mas
Distance	166 ± 5 ly (51 ± 1 pc)
Absolute magnitude (M_{V})	+6.22

Details
Mass	0.82±0.08 M_{☉}
Radius	1.06±0.04 R_{☉}
Luminosity	0.60 L_{☉}
Surface gravity (log g)	4.28 cgs
Temperature	4750±50 K
Metallicity [Fe/H]	−1.49 dex
Rotation	0.380±0.004 days
Rotational velocity (v sin i)	135 km/s
Age	33±5 Myr

Other designations
- Speedy Mic, BO Mic, CD−37 13926, CPD−37 8883, HD 197890, HIP 102626, SAO 212437, PPM 300614, TIC 389423271, TYC 7469-997-1, GSC 07469-00997

Database references
SIMBAD	data

Speedy Mic is a star in the constellation Microscopium located about 170 light-years (52 parsecs; 11 million astronomical units) from the Sun. Its name refers to its very rapid rotation; it also has the variable star designation BO Microscopii (BO Mic). The projected rotational velocity at the equator of this star is about 135 km/s (84 mi/s), which, with an estimated inclination of 70° to the line of sight from the Earth, means it completes a rotation every 0.380 ± 0.004 days (9.120 ± 0.096 hours).

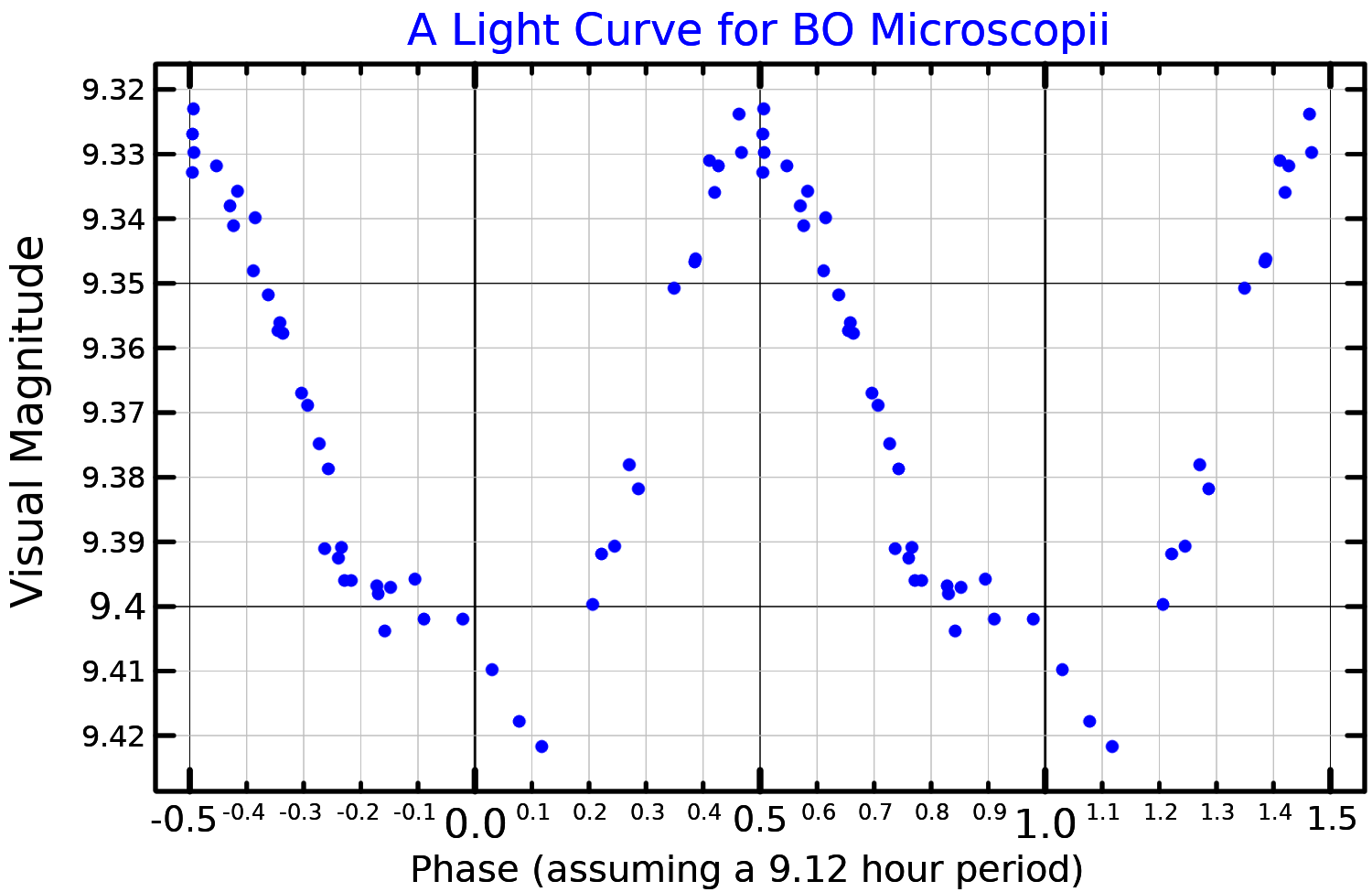
A visual band light curve for BO Microscopii, adapted from Cutispoto et al. (1997)

The star was discovered to be active and a rapid rotator in a 1990 all-sky extreme ultraviolet survey by the ROSAT space telescope, and was given the name Speedy Mic; Mic is the abbreviation for Microscopium. The name has been commonly used since and was officially approved by the IAU Working Group on Star Names on 9 May 2026.

The photosphere of this star shows a high level of magnetic activity, with multiple star spots and prominences observed at the same time. As many as 25 prominences have been observed simultaneously, extending outward as far as 3.6 times the radius of the star. BO Mic is a flare star that undergoes sudden increases in X-ray and ultraviolet emissions. These events can emit a hundred times more energy than large solar flares. Speedy Mic is one of the most active stars in the vicinity of the Sun.
