= R Microscopii =

Variable star in the constellation Microscopium

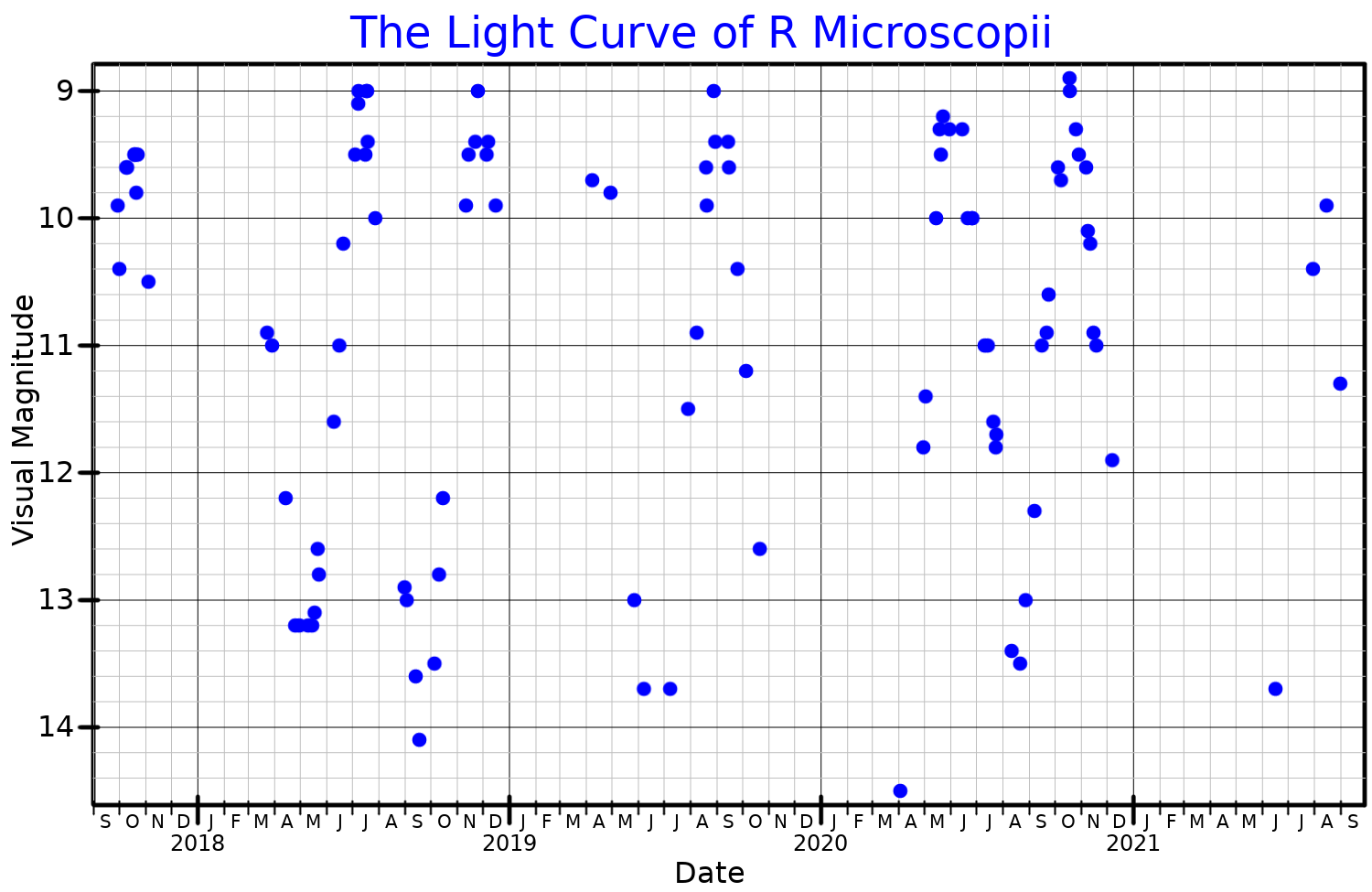
- The visual band light curve of R Microscopii, from AAVSO data

Observation data Epoch J2000.0 Equinox J2000.0 (ICRS)
- Constellation: Microscopium
- Right ascension: 20^{h} 40^{m} 02.98684^{s} .
- Declination: −28° 47′ 31.1983″
- Apparent magnitude (V): 8.3-13.8

Characteristics
- Spectral type: M4e

Astrometry
Parallax (π)	1.2239±0.1089 mas
Distance	2,700 ± 200 ly (820 ± 70 pc)

Other designations
- R Microscopii, HD 196717, HIP 101985, CD–29° 17235

Database references
SIMBAD	data

R Microscopii is a star in the constellation Microscopium. It is a red giant star of spectral type M4e that is also a Mira variable, with an apparent magnitude ranging between 8.3 and 13.8 over 138 days. Located around 1000 light-years distant, it shines with a luminosity 444 times that of the Sun and has a surface temperature of 3141 K. The Astronomical Society of Southern Africa in 2003 reported that observations of R Microscopii were urgently needed as data on its light curve was incomplete.
