= Gamma Microscopii =

Star in the constellation Microscopium

- Location of γ Microscopii (circled)

Observation data Epoch J2000.0 Equinox J2000.0 (ICRS)
- Constellation: Microscopium
- Right ascension: 21^{h} 01^{m} 17.46047^{s}
- Declination: −32° 15′ 27.9574″
- Apparent magnitude (V): 4.680

Characteristics
- Evolutionary stage: red clump
- Spectral type: G6 III
- U−B color index: +0.575
- B−V color index: +0.882
- R−I color index: +0.32

Astrometry
Radial velocity (R_{v})	+17.6 km/s
Proper motion (μ)	RA: −1.73 mas/yr Dec.: +0.41 mas/yr
Parallax (π)	14.6428±0.4966 mas
Distance	223 ± 8 ly (68 ± 2 pc)
Absolute magnitude (M_{V})	0.49

Details
Mass	2.80±0.13 M_{☉}
Radius	9.49±0.35 R_{☉}
Luminosity	60.5±4.1 L_{☉}
Surface gravity (log g)	2.985±0.080 cgs
Temperature	5,227±34 K
Metallicity [Fe/H]	+0.033±0.030 dex
Age	620 Myr

Other designations
- Gamma Microscopii, Gamma Mic, γ Mic, CD−32 16353, CPD−32 6269, FK5 1550, GC 29331, HD 199951, HIP 103738, HR 8039, SAO 212636, WDS 21013-3215A.

Database references
SIMBAD	data

Gamma Microscopii (γ Microscopii, γ Mic) is the brightest star in the faint southern constellation of Microscopium. It has an apparent visual magnitude of 4.68, which is too dim to be viewed from city skies. The distance to this star has been determined using parallax measurements made with the Gaia telescope, which place it at 223 ± 8 light-years (68.4 ± 2.5 parsecs).

Based upon a stellar classification of G6 III, this is a G-type giant star. It is a core helium fusing star that is classified as a member of the red clump evolutionary branch, although the metallicity of this star—meaning the abundance of elements other than hydrogen and helium—is anomalously low for a member of this group. The effective temperature of the star's outer envelope is 5,050 K, giving it the yellow-hued glow typical of G-type stars.

In the galactic coordinate system, this star has space velocity components of [U, V, W] = [+13.75, +3.47, –10.50] km s^{−1}. The peculiar velocity of this star, relative to its neighbors, is 1.2 km s^{−1}. It has been listed as likely member of the Ursa Major Moving Group of stars that share a similar location and a common trajectory through space. Backwards extrapolation of the motion of γ Microscopii has shown that approximately 3.8 million years ago, it was only around 6 light-years from the Sun. It would then have had an apparent magnitude of −3 and have been brighter than Sirius is now. Shortly before that, around 3.9 million years ago, it likely passed within 1.14 to 3.45 light-years of the Sun, possibly massive enough and close enough to disturb the Oort cloud. The same authors looked at Proper Motion Data collected with Gaia DR2 and didn't confirm the close encounter based on that dataset. Additional information is needed to identify the root cause for the mismatch between Hipparcos and Gaia datasets in that case.

Gamma Microscopii has a visual companion, CCDM J21013-3215B at an angular separation of 26 arcseconds along a position angle of 94°, with an apparent visual magnitude of approximately 13.7. Most likely this star is not gravitationally bound to γ Microscopii, but is merely a line of sight companion.

The Bayer designation γ Microscopii was not assigned by Bayer himself. It was given the Flamsteed designation of 1 Piscis Austrini before Lacaille created the constellation of Microscopium in 1756.
