= WASP-7 b =

Extrasolar planet in the constellation Microscopium

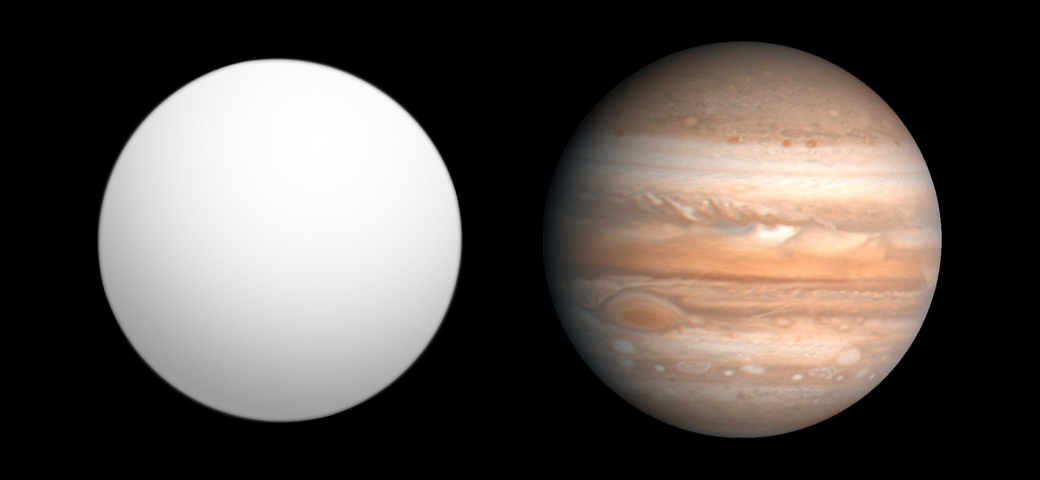
- Size comparison of WASP-7 b with Jupiter.

Discovery
- Discovered by: Cameron et al. (SuperWASP)
- Discovery site: SAAO
- Discovery date: April 1, 2008
- Detection method: Transit

Orbital characteristics
- Semi-major axis: 0.0618^{+0.0014}_{−0.0033} AU
- Eccentricity: 0.0173^{+0.0009}_{−0.0011}
- Orbital period (sidereal): 4.954658^{+5.5e-5}_{−4.3e-5} d
- Inclination: 89.6^{+0.4}_{−0.9}
- Star: WASP-7

Physical characteristics
- Mean radius: 0.915^{+0.046}_{−0.04} R_{J}
- Mass: 0.96^{+0.12}_{−0.18} M_{J}
- Mean density: 1.66 g/cm^{3}
- Surface gravity: 3.03 g
- Temperature: 1393^{+80}_{−82} K

WASP-7 b is an extrasolar planet discovered in 2008. This 5-day period planet, orbiting a round the star WASP-7, is slightly smaller than Jupiter, roughly the same mass and more dense.

A study in 2012, utilizing the Rossiter–McLaughlin effect, determined the planetary orbit is strongly misaligned with the equatorial plane of the star, with misalignment equal to 86±8°, making the planetary orbit nearly polar. The orbit is also slightly eccentric, which is surprising given the tidal circularization timescale of below 650 million years.

== Physical properties ==
The measured temperature on the planetary dayside is 1393^{+80}_{−82} K. Sodium was detected in the planetary atmosphere in 2022.

== See also ==
- SuperWASP
