= Theta2 Microscopii =

Star in the constellation Microscopium

θ^{2} Microscopii
- Location of θ^{2} Microscopii (circled)

Observation data Epoch J2000 Equinox ICRS
- Constellation: Microscopium
- Right ascension: 21^{h} 24^{m} 24.81796^{s}
- Declination: −41° 00′ 24.1033″
- Apparent magnitude (V): 5.76

Characteristics
- Spectral type: A0IIIpSi
- U−B color index: -0.21
- B−V color index: -0.04

Astrometry
Radial velocity (R_{v})	+8.00 km/s
Proper motion (μ)	RA: +24.64 mas/yr Dec.: −0.25 mas/yr
Parallax (π)	8.35±0.70 mas
Distance	390 ± 30 ly (120 ± 10 pc)
Absolute magnitude (M_{V})	0.39

Orbit
Period (P)	464.66 yr
Semi-major axis (a)	0.836″
Eccentricity (e)	0.210
Inclination (i)	111.8°

Details
Luminosity	78.22 L_{☉}
Temperature	10,378 K

Other designations
- CD−41 14503, CCDM J21245-4100AB, GC 29950, HIP 105696, HR 8180, HD 203585, SAO 230667, WDS J21244-4100AB

Database references
SIMBAD	data

Theta^{2} Microscopii (θ^{2} Mic) is a class A0III (white giant) star in the constellation Microscopium. Its apparent magnitude is 5.76 and it is approximately 390 light years away based on parallax. It is an Ap star, a chemically peculiar star with unusually strong metallic spectral lines.

The main star is known to be a binary, with two components A (6.24 mag) and B (6.88 mag) orbiting with a semimajor axis of 0.836" and eccentricity 0.201, with a period 464.66 years. A more distant companion, C, has a separation around 78.4" and magnitude 10.3.
