= Iota Microscopii =

Star in the constellation Microscopium

ι Microscopii
- Location of ι Microscopii (circled)

Observation data Epoch J2000 Equinox ICRS
- Constellation: Microscopium
- Right ascension: 20^{h} 48^{m} 29.14779^{s}
- Declination: −43° 59′ 18.6369″
- Apparent magnitude (V): 5.11

Characteristics
- Spectral type: F2V
- U−B color index: +0.04
- B−V color index: +0.35

Astrometry
Radial velocity (R_{v})	−14.35±0.69 km/s
Proper motion (μ)	RA: +178.881 mas/yr Dec.: −112.407 mas/yr
Parallax (π)	26.9052±0.1782 mas
Distance	121.2 ± 0.8 ly (37.2 ± 0.2 pc)
Absolute magnitude (M_{V})	2.05

Details
Mass	1.42 M_{☉}
Radius	2.4 R_{☉}
Luminosity	12.65 L_{☉}
Surface gravity (log g)	3.90±0.14 cgs
Temperature	6,997±238 K
Metallicity [Fe/H]	−0.03 dex
Rotational velocity (v sin i)	115 km/s
Age	1.094 Gyr

Other designations
- ι Mic, CD−44°14145, FK5 1542, GC 28980, GJ 808.1, GJ 9708, HD 197937, HIP 102693, HR 7943, SAO 230379, CCDM J20485-4359A, WDS J20485-4359A

Database references
SIMBAD	data

ι Microscopii, Latinized as Iota Microscopii, is a suspected astrometric binary star system in the southern constellation of Microscopium, near the southern constellation border with Indus. It is visible to the naked eye as a dim, yellow-white hued point of light with an apparent visual magnitude of 5.11. This object is 121 light years from the Sun based on parallax, but is drifting closer with a radial velocity of −14 km/s.

The visible component is an ordinary F-type main-sequence star with a stellar classification of F2V, which indicates it is generating energy through core hydrogen fusion. It is around a billion years old with 1.4 times the mass of the Sun and 2.4 times the Sun's radius. The star is radiating 13 times the luminosity of the Sun from its photosphere at an effective temperature of 6,997 K. It has a high rate of spin with a projected rotational velocity of 115 km/s, which is giving the star an equatorial bulge that is 6% larger than the polar radius.

Iota Microscopii has one visual companion, first observed in 1932, with a separation of 4.3" and a visual magnitude of 15.5.
