= 3 Piscis Austrini =

Star in the constellation Microscopium

- Location of 3 PsA (circled)

Observation data Epoch J2000.0 Equinox ICRS
- Constellation: Microscopium
- Right ascension: 21^{h} 13^{m} 17.32730^{s}
- Declination: −27° 37′ 09.7106″
- Apparent magnitude (V): 5.39±0.01

Characteristics
- Spectral type: K3 III
- B−V color index: +1.42

Astrometry
Radial velocity (R_{v})	−46.2±2.4 km/s
Proper motion (μ)	RA: +98.513 mas/yr Dec.: −110.906 mas/yr
Parallax (π)	8.0734±0.1733 mas
Distance	404 ± 9 ly (124 ± 3 pc)
Absolute magnitude (M_{V})	+0.19

Details
Mass	1.58 M_{☉}
Radius	31.3±1.6 R_{☉}
Luminosity	184^{+9}_{−8} L_{☉}
Surface gravity (log g)	1.86 cgs
Temperature	4,225±123 K
Metallicity [Fe/H]	−0.17 dex
Rotational velocity (v sin i)	<1 km/s
Age	2.59^{+0.83}_{−1.90} Gyr

Other designations
- 3 PsA, 58 G. Microscopii, CD−28°17178, CPD−28°7411, FK5 1556, GC 29652, HD 201901, HIP 104750, HR 8110, SAO 190129

Database references
SIMBAD	data

3 Piscis Austrini, also known as HD 201901 or simply 3 PsA, is an astrometric binary (100% chance) located in the southern constellation Microscopium. It was once part of Piscis Austrinus, the southern fish. The system has a combined apparent magnitude of 5.39, making it faintly visible to the naked eye under ideal conditions. Gaia DR3 parallax measurements imply a distance of 404 light years and it is currently approaching the Solar System with a heliocentric radial velocity of −46.2 km/s. At its current distance, 3 PsA's brightness is diminished by 0.12 magnitudes due to extinction from interstellar dust and it has an absolute magnitude of +0.19.

The visible component is an evolved red giant with a stellar classification of K3 III. The interferometry-measured angular diameter of the star, after correcting for limb darkening, is 2.03±0.04 mas, which, at its estimated distance, equates to a physical radius of about 20 times the radius of the Sun. However, its actual empirical radius is 31.3 R_{☉}. It has 1.58 times the mass of the Sun and is radiating 184 times the luminosity of the Sun from its enlarged photosphere at an effective temperature of 4,225 K. 3 PsA is metal deficient with an iron abundance 68% that of the Sun ([Fe/H] = −0.17) and it spins too slowly for its projected rotational velocity to be measured accurately. It is estimated to be 2.59 billion years old based on Gaia DR3 models.
