= Epsilon Microscopii =

Star in the constellation Microscopium

ε Microscopii
- Location of ε Microscopii (circled)

Observation data Epoch J2000 Equinox ICRS
- Constellation: Microscopium
- Right ascension: 21^{h} 17^{m} 56.28399^{s}
- Declination: −32° 10′ 21.1515″
- Apparent magnitude (V): 4.71

Characteristics
- Spectral type: A1V
- U−B color index: +0.02
- B−V color index: +0.06

Astrometry
Radial velocity (R_{v})	+7.20 km/s
Proper motion (μ)	RA: +54.36 mas/yr Dec.: −23.29 mas/yr
Parallax (π)	19.7054±0.5472 mas
Distance	166 ± 5 ly (51 ± 1 pc)
Absolute magnitude (M_{V})	0.97

Details
Mass	2.18 M_{☉}
Radius	2.2 R_{☉}
Luminosity	35.62 L_{☉}
Surface gravity (log g)	4.37 cgs
Temperature	9,126 K
Metallicity [Fe/H]	−0.01 dex
Rotational velocity (v sin i)	127 km/s
Age	525 Myr

Other designations
- Aerostaticus, ε Mic, CD−32°16498, CPD−32°6329, FK5 801, GC 29774, HD 202627, HIP 105140, HR 8135, SAO 212874

Database references
SIMBAD	data

Epsilon Microscopii, also named Aerostaticus, is a single, white-hued star in the southern constellationof Microscopium. It is faintly visible to the naked eye with an apparent visual magnitude of 4.71. The annual parallax shift of the star is 19.7054 mas as measured from Earth, which yields a distance estimate of around 166 light years. It is moving further from the Sun with a radial velocity of +7 km/s.

This star has a stellar classification of A1 V, indicating it is an A-type main-sequence star that is generating energy through hydrogen fusion at its core. The stellar spectrum displays an overabundance of silicon in the star's atmosphere, but the abundance of iron is the same as in the Sun. The star has 2.2 times the mass of the Sun and 2.2 times the Sun's radius. It is around a half billion years old and is spinning rapidly with a projected rotational velocity of 127 km/s. Epsilon Microscopii is radiating about 36 times the Sun's luminosity from its photosphere at an effective temperature of 9,126 K.

Epsilon Microscopii, Latinized from ε Microscopii, is the star's Bayer designation. It also had the Flamsteed designation 4 Piscis Austrini, assigned before the constellation Microscopium was invented by Lacaille.

This star was the brightest star in the obsolete constellation Globus Aerostaticus, the hot air balloon, with Johann Elert Bode designating it with the Latin letter a. The IAU Working Group on Star Names adopted the name Aerostaticus for this star on 16 July 2026, after the obsolete constellation.
