= Alpha Microscopii =

Star in the constellation Microscopium

α Microscopii
- Location of α Microscopii (circled)

Observation data Epoch J2000.0 Equinox ICRS
- Constellation: Microscopium
- Right ascension: 20^{h} 49^{m} 58.0810^{s}
- Declination: −33° 46′ 46.934″
- Apparent magnitude (V): 4.89±0.01

Characteristics
- Evolutionary stage: red giant branch
- Spectral type: G7 III or G8 III
- U−B color index: +0.73
- B−V color index: +1.00

Astrometry
Radial velocity (R_{v})	−14.50±0.09 km/s
Proper motion (μ)	RA: +15.057 mas/yr Dec.: −23.524 mas/yr
Parallax (π)	8.2508±0.1563 mas
Distance	395 ± 7 ly (121 ± 2 pc)
Absolute magnitude (M_{V})	−0.45±0.20

Details
Mass	3.19±0.32 M_{☉}
Radius	18.41±1.38 R_{☉}
Luminosity	173±25 L_{☉}
Surface gravity (log g)	2.27±0.11 cgs
Temperature	4,881±43 K
Metallicity [Fe/H]	−0.06±0.04 dex
Rotational velocity (v sin i)	2.6±2 km/s
Age	400 Myr

Other designations
- α Mic, 27 G. Microscopii, CD−34°14660, CPD−34°8799, GC 29026, HD 198232, HIP 102831, HR 7965, SAO 212472, WDS 20500-3347A

Database references
SIMBAD	data

Alpha Microscopii (α Microscopii) is a star in the southern constellation of Microscopium. It is visible to the naked eye with an apparent visual magnitude of 4.89. Based upon an annual parallax shift of 8.2508 mas as seen from the Earth, it is located 395 light years from the Sun, give or take 7 light years. The star is moving nearer to the Sun with a heliocentric radial velocity of −15 km/s

This is an evolved giant star of type G with a stellar classification of either G7 III or G8 III depending on the source. At the age of 400 million years, it has an estimated 3.19 times the mass of the Sun and has expanded to 18.4 times the Sun's radius. The star is radiating 173 times the Sun's luminosity from its expanded photosphere at an effective temperature of 4,881 K, giving a yellow hue.

This star has an optical visual companion, CCDM J20500-3347B, of apparent visual magnitude 10.0 approximately 20.4 arcseconds away at a position angle of 166°. It has no physical connection to the star described above. As for Alpha Microscopii, it was found to be a probable spectroscopic binary in 2014.
