= Theta1 Microscopii =

Star in the constellation Microscopium

- Location of θ^{1} Microscopii (circled)

Observation data Epoch J2000 Equinox ICRS
- Constellation: Microscopium
- Right ascension: 21^{h} 20^{m} 45.62633^{s}
- Declination: −40° 48′ 34.3607″
- Apparent magnitude (V): 4.77 to 4.87

Characteristics
- Spectral type: A7VpSrCrEu
- U−B color index: -0.07
- B−V color index: +0.02
- Variable type: α^{2} CVn

Astrometry
Radial velocity (R_{v})	+2.30 km/s
Proper motion (μ)	RA: +75.480 mas/yr Dec.: +8.657 mas/yr
Parallax (π)	18.2678±0.5314 mas
Distance	179 ± 5 ly (55 ± 2 pc)
Absolute magnitude (M_{V})	1.03

Details
Mass	2.32+0.18 −0.26 M_{☉}
Radius	2.35±0.34 R_{☉}
Luminosity	36.3+8.4 −6.8 L_{☉}
Surface gravity (log g)	4.06±0.12 cgs
Temperature	9,240±480 K
Metallicity [Fe/H]	0.00 dex
Rotational velocity (v sin i)	43.7±1.7 km/s
Age	437±209 Myr

Other designations
- θ^{1} Mic, CD−41°14475, FK5 802, GC 29854, HD 203006, HIP 105382, HR 8151, SAO 230644, WDS J21208-4049

Database references
SIMBAD	data

θ^{1} Microscopii, Latinized as Theta^{1} Microscopii, is a suspected binary star system in the southern constellation of Microscopium. It is visible to the naked eye was a faint, white-hued point of light with an apparent visual magnitude of about 4.8. The distance to this system is approximately 179 light years based on parallax.

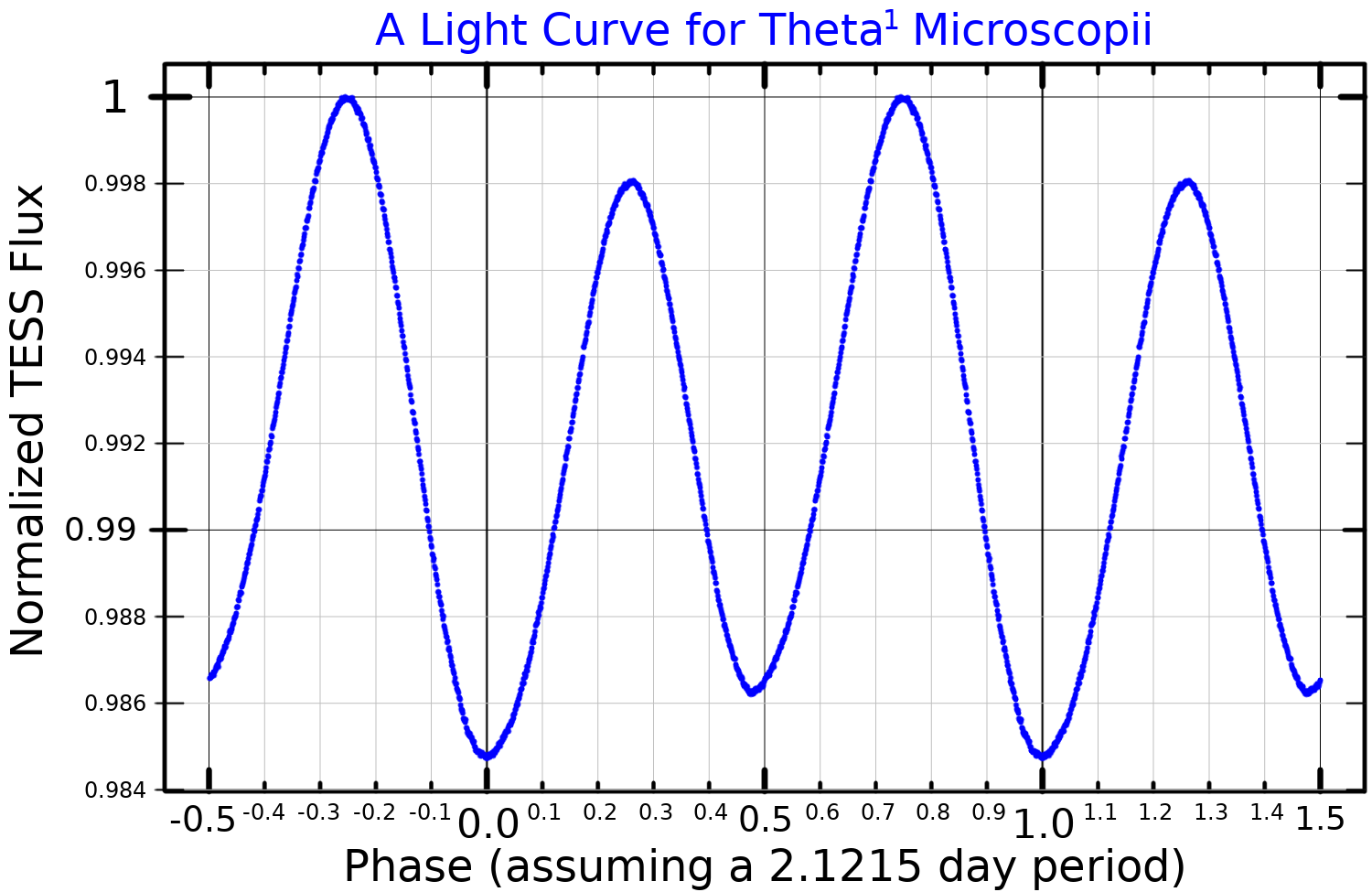
A light curve for Theta^{1} Microscopii, plotted from TESS data

The primary is an α^{2} CVn variable with a period of 2.125 days and a magnitude ranging from 4.77 to 4.87, as well as an Ap star, a chemically peculiar star with strong metallic lines in its spectrum. It is an A-type main-sequence star with a stellar classification of A7VpSrCrEu, where the suffix notation indicates abundance anomalies of strontium, chromium, and europium. The star is 437 million years old with 2.3 times the mass of the Sun and 2.4 times the Sun's radius. It is radiating 36 times the luminosity of the Sun from its photosphere at an effective temperature of 9,240 K.

Its companion is a magnitude 7.42 star at an angular separation of 0.10″ from the primary along a position angle of 46°, as of 2018.
