= Microscopium =

Minor constellation in the southern celestial hemisphere

- Constellation
- List of stars in Microscopium
- Abbreviation: Mic
- Genitive: Microscopii
- Pronunciation: /ˌmaɪkrəˈskɒpiəm/, genitive /ˌmaɪkrəˈskɒpiaɪ/
- Symbolism: the Microscope
- Right ascension: 21^{h}
- Declination: −36°
- Quadrant: SQ4
- Area: 210 sq. deg. (66th)
- Main stars: 5
- Bayer/Flamsteed stars: 13
- Stars brighter than 3.00^{m}: 0
- Stars within 10.00 pc (32.62 ly): 2
- Brightest star: γ Mic (4.67^{m})
- Nearest star: Lacaille 8760
- Messier objects: 0
- Meteor showers: Microscopiids
- Bordering constellations: Capricornus; Sagittarius; Telescopium (corner); Indus; Grus; Piscis Austrinus
- Visible at latitudes between +45° and −90°. Best visible at 21:00 (9 p.m.) during the month of September.

Microscopium ("the Microscope") is a minor constellation in the southern celestial hemisphere, one of twelve created in the 18th century by French astronomer Nicolas-Louis de Lacaille and one of several depicting scientific instruments. The name is a Latinised form of the Greek word for microscope. Its stars are faint and hardly visible from most of the non-tropical Northern Hemisphere.

The constellation's brightest star is Gamma Microscopii of apparent magnitude 4.68, a yellow giant 2.5 times the Sun's mass located 223 ± 8 light-years distant. It passed within 1.14 and 3.45 light-years of the Sun some 3.9 million years ago, possibly disturbing the outer Solar System. Three star systems—WASP-7, AU Microscopii and HD 205739—have been determined to have planets, while other star —the Sun-like star HD 202628— has a debris disk. AU Microscopii and the binary red dwarf system AT Microscopii are probably a wide triple system and members of the Beta Pictoris moving group. Nicknamed "Speedy Mic", BO Microscopii is a star with an extremely fast rotation period of 9 hours, 7 minutes.

== Characteristics ==
Microscopium is a small constellation bordered by Capricornus to the north, Piscis Austrinus and Grus to the east, Sagittarius to the west, and Indus to the south, touching on Telescopium to the southwest. The recommended three-letter abbreviation for the constellation, as adopted by the International Astronomical Union in 1922, is "Mic". The official constellation boundaries, as set by Belgian astronomer Eugène Delporte in 1930, are defined by a polygon of four segments (illustrated in infobox). In the equatorial coordinate system, the right ascension coordinates of these borders lie between 20^{h} 27.3^{m} and 21^{h} 28.4^{m} , while the declination coordinates are between −27.45° and −45.09°. The whole constellation is visible to observers south of latitude 45°N. (Note: While parts of the constellation technically rise above the horizon to observers between 45°N and 62°N, stars within a few degrees of the horizon are to all intents and purposes unobservable.) Given that its brightest stars are of fifth magnitude, the constellation is invisible to the naked eye in areas with light polluted skies. (Note: Objects of magnitude 5.0 are barely visible to the unaided eye in the night skies of city-suburban transition areas.)

== Features ==
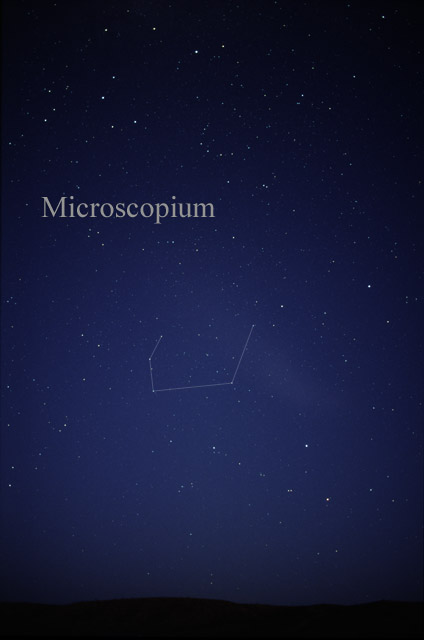
The constellation Microscopium as it can be seen by the naked eye.

=== Stars ===
French astronomer Nicolas-Louis de Lacaille charted and designated ten stars with the Bayer designations Alpha through to Iota in 1756. A star in neighbouring Indus that Lacaille had labelled Nu Indi turned out to be in Microscopium, so Gould renamed it Nu Microscopii. Francis Baily considered Gamma and Epsilon Microscopii to belong to the neighbouring constellation Piscis Austrinus, but subsequent cartographers did not follow this. In his 1725 Catalogus Britannicus, John Flamsteed labelled the stars 1, 2, 3 and 4 Piscis Austrini, which became Gamma Microscopii, HR 8076, HR 8110 and Epsilon Microscopii respectively. Within the constellation's borders, there are 43 stars brighter than or equal to apparent magnitude 6.5. (Note: Objects of magnitude 6.5 are among the faintest visible to the unaided eye in suburban-rural transition night skies.)

Depicting the eyepiece of the microscope is Gamma Microscopii, which—at magnitude of 4.68—is the brightest star in the constellation. Having spent much of its 620-million-year lifespan as a blue-white main sequence star, it has swollen and cooled to become a yellow giant of spectral type G6III, with a diameter ten times that of the Sun. Measurement of its parallax yields a distance of 223 ± 8 light years from Earth. It likely passed within 1.14 and 3.45 light-years of the Sun some 3.9 million years ago, at around 2.5 times the mass of the Sun, it is possibly massive enough and close enough to disturb the Oort cloud. Alpha Microscopii is also an ageing yellow giant star of spectral type G7III with an apparent magnitude of 4.90. Located 400 ± 30 light-years away from Earth, it has swollen to 17.5 times the diameter of the Sun. Alpha has a 10th magnitude companion, visible in 7.5 cm telescopes, though this is a coincidental closeness rather than a true binary system. Epsilon Microscopii lies 166 ± 5 light-years away, and is a white star of apparent magnitude 4.7, and spectral type A1V. Theta^{1} and Theta^{2} Microscopii make up a wide double whose components are splittable to the naked eye. Both are white A-class magnetic spectrum variable stars with strong metallic lines, similar to Cor Caroli. They mark the constellation's specimen slide.

Many notable objects are too faint to be seen with the naked eye. AX Microscopii, better known as Lacaille 8760, is a red dwarf which lies only 12.9 light-years from the Solar System. At magnitude 6.68, it is the brightest red dwarf in the sky. BO Microscopii is a rapidly rotating star that has 80% the diameter of the Sun. Nicknamed "Speedy Mic", it has a rotation period of 9 hours 7 minutes. An active star, it has prominent stellar flares that average 100 times stronger than those of the Sun, and are emitting energy mainly in the X-ray and ultraviolet bands of the spectrum. It lies 218 ± 4 light-years away from the Sun. AT Microscopii is a binary star system, both members of which are flare star red dwarfs. The system lies close to and may form a very wide triple system with AU Microscopii, a young star which has a planetary system in the making with a debris disk. The three stars are candidate members of the Beta Pictoris moving group, one of the nearest associations of stars that share a common motion through space.

The Astronomical Society of Southern Africa in 2003 reported that observations of four of the Mira variables in Microscopium were very urgently needed as data on their light curves was incomplete. Two of them—R and S Microscopii—are challenging stars for novice amateur astronomers, and the other two, U and RY Microscopii, are more difficult still. Another red giant, T Microscopii, is a semiregular variable that ranges between magnitudes 7.7 and 9.6 over 344 days. Of apparent magnitude 11, DD Microscopii is a symbiotic star system composed of an orange giant of spectral type K2III and white dwarf in close orbit, with the smaller star ionizing the stellar wind of the larger star. The system has a low metallicity. Combined with its high galactic latitude, this indicates that the star system has its origin in the galactic halo of the Milky Way.

HD 205739 is a yellow-white main sequence star of spectral type F7V that is around 1.22 times as massive and 2.3 times as luminous as the Sun. It has a Jupiter-sized planet with an orbital period of 280 days that was discovered by the radial velocity method. WASP-7 is a star of spectral type F5V with an apparent magnitude of 9.54, about 1.28 times as massive as the Sun. Its hot Jupiter planet—WASP-7b—was discovered by transit method and found to orbit the star every 4.95 days. HD 202628 is a sunlike star of spectral type G2V with a debris disk that ranges from 158 to 220 AU distant. Its inner edge is sharply defined, indicating a probable planet orbiting between 86 and 158 AU from the star.

=== Deep-sky objects ===
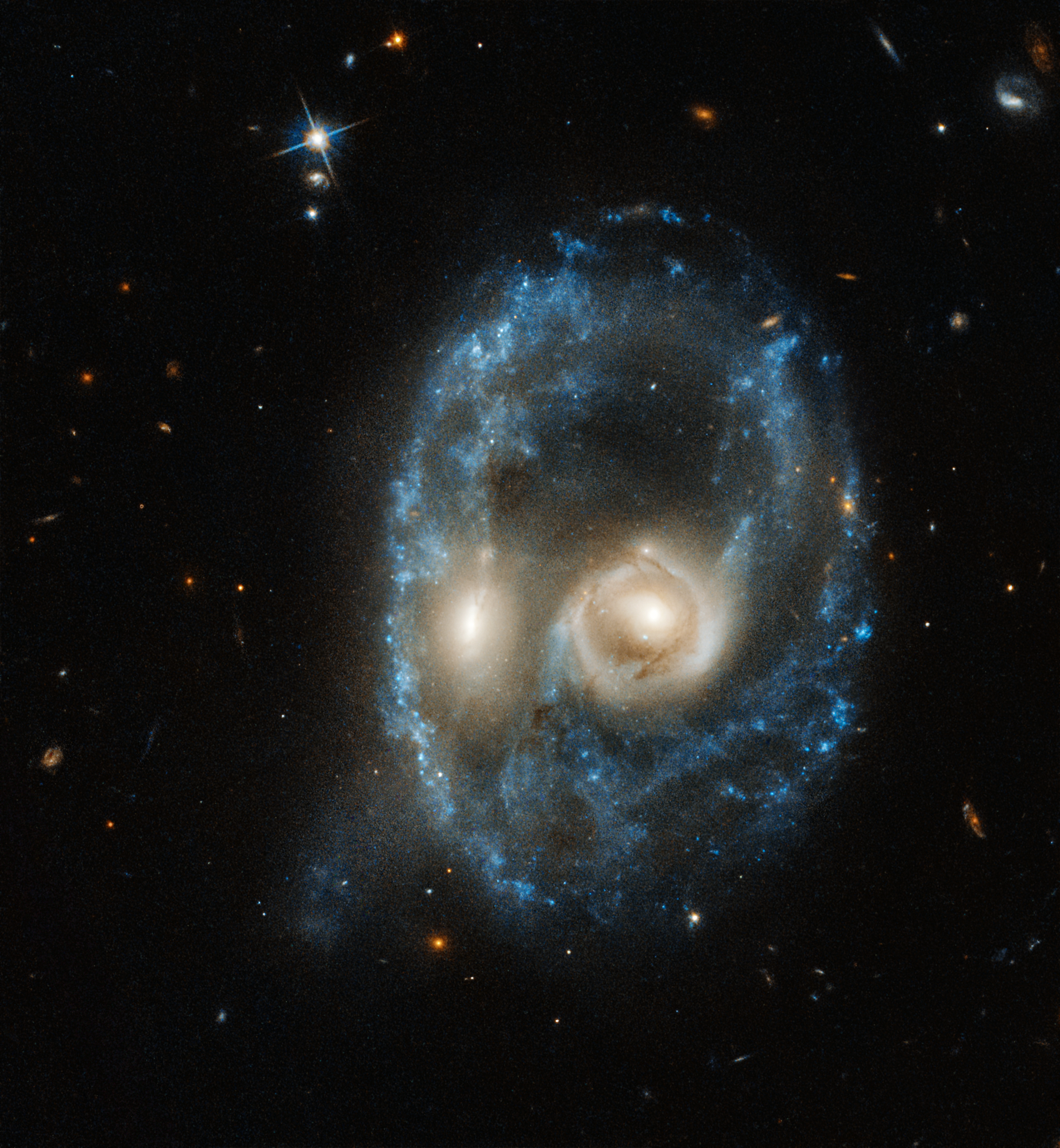
Arp-Madore 2026-424 taken by Hubble.

Describing Microscopium as "totally unremarkable", astronomer Patrick Moore concluded there was nothing of interest for amateur observers. NGC 6925 is a barred spiral galaxy of apparent magnitude 11.3 which is lens-shaped, as it lies almost edge-on to observers on Earth, 3.7 degrees west-northwest of Alpha Microscopii. SN 2011ei, a Type II Supernova in NGC 6925, was discovered by Stu Parker in New Zealand in July 2011. NGC 6923 lies nearby and is a magnitude fainter still. The Microscopium Void is a roughly rectangular region of relatively empty space, bounded by incomplete sheets of galaxies from other voids. The Microscopium Supercluster is an overdensity of galaxy clusters that was first noticed in the early 1990s. The component Abell clusters 3695 and 3696 are likely to be gravitationally bound, while the relations of Abell clusters 3693 and 3705 in the same field are unclear.

=== Meteor showers ===
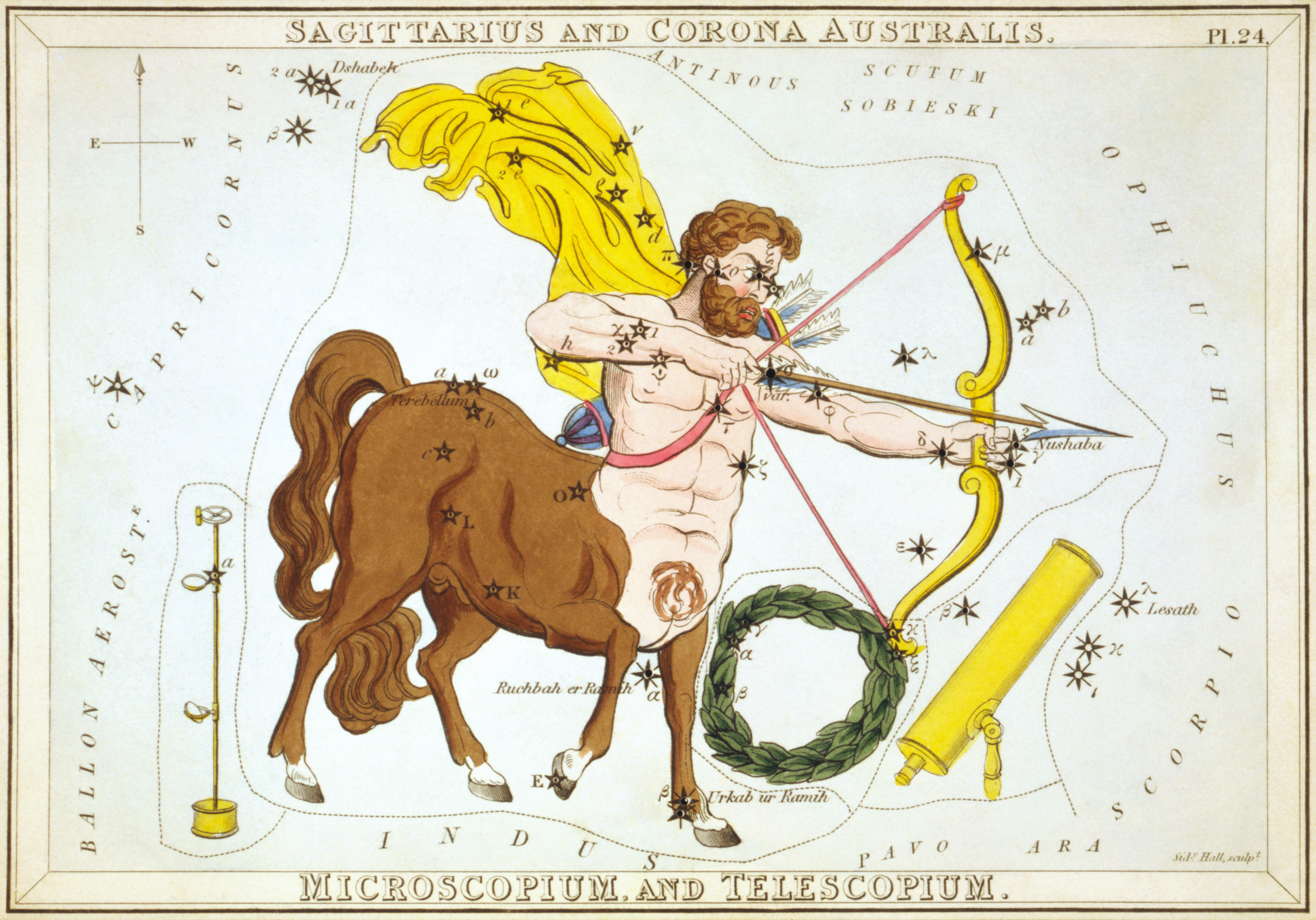
Seen in the 1824 star chart set Urania's Mirror (in the lower left)

The Microscopids are a minor meteor shower that appear from June to mid-July.

== History ==
Microscopium lies in a region where Ptolemy had listed six 'unformed' stars behind the tail of Piscis Austrinus. Al-Sufi did not include these stars in his revision of the Almagest, presumably because he could not identify them. Microscopium was introduced in 1751–52 by Lacaille with the French name le Microscope, after he had observed and catalogued 10,000 southern stars during a two-year stay at the Cape of Good Hope. He devised fourteen new constellations in uncharted regions of the Southern Celestial Hemisphere not visible from Europe. All but one honoured instruments that symbolised the Age of Enlightenment. Commemorating the compound microscope, the Microscope's name had been Latinised by Lacaille to Microscopium by 1763.

== See also ==
- Microscopium (Chinese astronomy)
