= List of stars in Microscopium =

This is the list of notable stars in the constellation Microscopium, sorted by decreasing brightness.

Name	B	F	G	Var	HD	HIP	RA	Dec	vis. mag.	abs. mag.	Dist. (ly)	Sp. class	Notes
γ Mic	γ	(1)			199951	103738	21^{h} 01^{m} 17.46^{s}	−32° 15′ 28.0″	4.67	0.49	223	G8III	variable star, ΔV = 0.007^{m}, P = 8.72829 d, 1 PsA
ε Mic	ε	(4)			202627	105140	21^{h} 17^{m} 56.25^{s}	−32° 10′ 20.9″	4.71	1.19	165	A0V	Aerostaticus, 4 PsA
θ^{1} Mic	θ^{1}				203006	105382	21^{h} 20^{m} 45.58^{s}	−40° 48′ 34.2″	4.80	1.01	186	A2p	α^{2} CVn variable, V_{max} = 4.77^{m}, V_{min} = 4.87^{m}, P = 2.1215 d
α Mic	α		27		198232	102831	20^{h} 49^{m} 58.08^{s}	−33° 46′ 46.8″	4.89	−0.45	380	G8III	
ι Mic	ι				197937	102693	20^{h} 48^{m} 29.00^{s}	−43° 59′ 17.8″	5.11	2.04	134	F1IV	
ν Mic	ν				195569	101477	20^{h} 33^{m} 55.06^{s}	−44° 30′ 57.5″	5.12	1.01	216	K0III	
2 PsA	ε	(2)	49		200763	104174	21^{h} 06^{m} 24.68^{s}	−32° 20′ 29.9″	5.20	0.02	354	K2III	
HD 201772	ξ		56		201772	104738	21^{h} 13^{m} 02.93^{s}	−39° 25′ 28.7″	5.25	2.63	109	F5V	
ζ Mic	ζ				200163	103882	21^{h} 02^{m} 57.97^{s}	−38° 37′ 52.3″	5.32	2.58	115	F3V	
HD 198716			33		198716	103127	20^{h} 53^{m} 40.15^{s}	−39° 48′ 34.7″	5.34	−0.17	412	K2III	
3 PsA	(d)	(3)	58		201901	104750	21^{h} 13^{m} 17.27^{s}	−27° 37′ 08.6″	5.41	0.01	391	K3III	
HD 196737			13		196737	102014	20^{h} 40^{m} 19.81^{s}	−33° 25′ 54.9″	5.47	1.14	239	K1III	
HD 197630			23		197630	102497	20^{h} 46^{m} 20.03^{s}	−39° 11′ 57.1″	5.48	0.52	320	B8/B9V	variable star, ΔV = 0.005^{m}, P = 0.32138 d
HD 204018	κ		69		204018	105913	21^{h} 27^{m} 01.66^{s}	−42° 32′ 52.7″	5.50	1.84	176	Am	
HD 198357			28		198357	102916	20^{h} 51^{m} 00.76^{s}	−37° 54′ 47.8″	5.52	−0.90	627	K3III	
η Mic	η				200702	104177	21^{h} 06^{m} 25.50^{s}	−41° 23′ 09.4″	5.55	−1.73	931	K3III	
HD 203949	λ				203949	105854	21^{h} 26^{m} 22.75^{s}	−37° 49′ 45.9″	5.64	1.00	276	K2III	has a planet (b)
δ Mic	δ				200718	104148	21^{h} 06^{m} 01.12^{s}	−30° 07′ 29.8″	5.69	0.65	332	K0/K1III	
HD 196917			17		196917	102092	20^{h} 41^{m} 23.58^{s}	−31° 35′ 53.3″	5.75	0.20	419	M1III	variable star, ΔV = 0.009^{m}, P = 0.86547 d
θ^{2} Mic	θ^{2}				203585	105696	21^{h} 24^{m} 24.80^{s}	−41° 00′ 24.1″	5.76	0.00	463	A0III	
HD 201647	π		55		201647	104680	21^{h} 12^{m} 13.67^{s}	−40° 16′ 07.8″	5.83	3.28	106	F5IV	suspected variable, ΔV = 0.03^{m}
HD 200073			43		200073	103836	21^{h} 02^{m} 27.05^{s}	−38° 31′ 50.0″	5.93	1.84	214	K2III	
HD 201852			57		201852	104752	21^{h} 13^{m} 18.94^{s}	−36° 25′ 24.7″	5.97	0.90	337	K0III	
β Mic	β		32		198529	102989	20^{h} 51^{m} 58.76^{s}	−33° 10′ 40.7″	6.06	−0.48	661	A1IV	
HD 194783			2		194783	101017	20^{h} 28^{m} 46.74^{s}	−35° 35′ 44.9″	6.09	−0.33	627	B8II/III	
HD 199684					199684	103646	20^{h} 59^{m} 59.62^{s}	−36° 07′ 46.2″	6.10	3.01	135	F2V	
HD 202287	(g)				202287	104980	21^{h} 15^{m} 46.76^{s}	−36° 12′ 38.5″	6.13	−0.98	862	K3III	
HD 202135					202135	104925	21^{h} 15^{m} 14.31^{s}	−40° 30′ 21.9″	6.20	−0.06	583	K1III	
HD 196748					196748	102057	20^{h} 40^{m} 55.61^{s}	−42° 23′ 48.2″	6.25	0.47	467	G6III	
HD 200245					200245	103902	21^{h} 03^{m} 10.17^{s}	−27° 43′ 53.4″	6.25	−1.69	1264	K0III	
AV Mic				AV	196829	102096	20^{h} 41^{m} 24.63^{s}	−42° 08′ 01.3″	6.28	−1.01	934	M3II	semiregular variable, V_{max} = 6.25^{m}, V_{min} = 6.35^{m}
HD 197093	ο				197093	102230	20^{h} 42^{m} 52.95^{s}	−39° 33′ 31.7″	6.30	−1.73	1315	K1III	
HD 195206					195206	101211	20^{h} 30^{m} 56.79^{s}	−29° 06′ 45.5″	6.35	0.05	594	A5V	
HD 198751					198751	103103	20^{h} 53^{m} 24.94^{s}	−30° 43′ 08.1″	6.35	0.29	531	K1III	
HD 195902					195902	101623	20^{h} 35^{m} 47.82^{s}	−44° 20′ 15.5″	6.36	0.86	411	K1III	
HD 202773	(n)				202773	105228	21^{h} 18^{m} 54.32^{s}	−28° 45′ 56.4″	6.40	0.94	403	K0IV	
BY Mic				BY	198853	103168	20^{h} 54^{m} 06.58^{s}	−27° 55′ 30.7″	6.41	−0.93	956	M1III	slow irregular variable
HD 195843					195843	101552	20^{h} 34^{m} 47.38^{s}	−30° 28′ 24.3″	6.42	0.12	593	B8V	
HD 198356					198356	102901	20^{h} 50^{m} 47.15^{s}	−32° 03′ 16.0″	6.42	−0.22	695	K5III	
HD 195814					195814	101558	20^{h} 34^{m} 55.46^{s}	−38° 05′ 23.5″	6.45	2.32	218	A5m...	
HD 197900					197900	102670	20^{h} 48^{m} 18.36^{s}	−44° 11′ 48.1″	6.47	0.20	584	K1IV	
HD 201242					201242	104441	21^{h} 09^{m} 22.31^{s}	−36° 42′ 20.2″	6.47	2.13	241	F7V	
HD 197649					197649	102496	20^{h} 46^{m} 18.58^{s}	−36° 07′ 12.1″	6.49	2.28	226	F3/F5V	
HD 199288	μ				199288	103458	20^{h} 57^{m} 40.49^{s}	–44° 07′ 37.2″	6.52		72	G0V	
Lacaille 8760				AX	202560	105090	21^{h} 17^{m} 15.3^{s}	−38° 52′ 02″	6.68	8.69	12.865	M0V	UV Ceti variable
HD 202628					202628	105184	21^{h} 18^{m} 27.27^{s}	−43° 20′ 04.7″	6.75		79.61	G5V	has a protoplanetary disk
HD 200554	ρ				200554	104125	21^{h} 05^{m} 40.97^{s}	–44° 56′ 56.5″	6.94		555	K1III	
AU Mic				AU	197481	102409	20^{h} 45^{m} 09.53^{s}	−31° 20′ 27.2″	8.63		32.306	M1Ve	T Tauri star, ΔV = 0.079^{m}, P = 4.85 d; has a protoplanetary disk
HD 203932				BI	203932		21^{h} 26^{m} 03.87^{s}	−29° 55′ 44.1″	8.81			A5p	rapidly oscillating Ap star, ΔB < 0.0024^{m}, P = 5.9 minutes
HD 202759				AW	202759	105249	21^{h} 19^{m} 05.92^{s}	−33° 55′ 07.9″	9.05		5300	A0:IIIw	RR Lyr variable, V_{max} = 9.04^{m}, V_{min} = 9.13^{m}, P = 0.305684 d
BO Mic				BO	197890	102626	20^{h} 47^{m} 45.01^{s}	−36° 35′ 40.8″	9.34	5.80	170.1	K3V(e)	Speedy Mic; rotating variable, ΔV = 0.059^{m}, P = 0.3804 d; one of the fastest known rotating stars
V Mic				V	203495	105638	21^{h} 23^{m} 48.77^{s}	−40° 42′ 05.12″	9.40		2100	M4e	Mira variable
ZZ Mic				ZZ	199757	103684	21^{h} 00^{m} 35.20^{s}	−42° 39′ 20.3″	9.43		911	A6IV	δ Sct variable, V_{max} = 9.27^{m}, V_{min} = 9.59^{m}, P = 0.0671792 d
WASP-7					197286		20^{h} 44^{m} 10.21^{s}	−39° 13′ 30.8″	9.54	3.66	490	F5V	has a transiting planet (b)
WASP-94 A							20^{h} 55^{m} 07.9^{s}	−34° 08′ 08″	10.1			F8	has a transiting planet (b)
AT Mic				AT	196982	102141	20^{h} 41^{m} 50.16^{s}	−32° 26′ 06.8″	10.36		34.87	M4Ve	flare star and BY Dra variable, ΔV = 0.029^{m}, P = 0.7813 d
WASP-94 B							20^{h} 55^{m} 09.2^{s}	−34° 08′ 08″	10.5			F9	has a transiting planet (b)
CD-43 14304				DD			21^{h} 00^{m} 06.36^{s}	−42° 38′ 44.9″	11.0			M0.2e	Z And variable, V_{max} = 11.0^{m}, V_{min} = 11.7^{m}, P = 399 d
CD−36 14261				DH			20^{h} 36^{m} 08.3^{s}	−36° 07′ 12″	11.6		55	M3Ve	BY Draconis variable
WASP-182							20^{h} 46^{m} 42.0^{s}	−41° 49′ 15″	12		1080		has a transiting planet (b)
WASP-133							20^{h} 58^{m} 18.0^{s}	−35° 47′ 48″	12.9		1491	G4	has a transiting planet (b)
WASP-144							21^{h} 23^{m} 03.0^{s}	−40° 02′ 54″	12.9			K2V	has a transiting planet (b)
WASP-92 A							20^{h} 55^{m} 08.0^{s}	−34° 08′ 08″	13.18		1729	F7	has a transiting planet (b)
PSR J2124-3358							21^{h} 24^{m} 43.85^{s}	−33° 58′ 44.67″					millisecond pulsar
Table legend: • Name = Proper name • B = Bayer designation • F or/and G. = Flamsteed designation or Gould designation • Var = Variable-star designation • HD = Henry Draper Catalogue designation number • HIP = Hipparcos Catalogue designation number • RA = Right ascension for the Epoch/Equinox J2000.0 • Dec = Declination for the Epoch/Equinox J2000.0 • vis. mag. = visual magnitude (m or m_{v}), also known as apparent magnitude • abs. mag. = absolute magnitude (M_{v}) • Dist. (ly) = Distance in light-years from Earth • Sp. class = Spectral class of the star in the stellar classification system • Notes = Common name(s) or alternate name(s); comments; notable properties [for example: multiple star status, range of variability if it is a variable star, exoplanets, etc.]

== See also ==
- List of stars by constellation
