= Homologous series =

Sequence of organic compounds with similar chemical properties

In organic chemistry, a homologous series is a sequence of compounds with the same functional group and similar chemical properties in which the members of the series differ by the number of repeating units they contain. This can be the length of a carbon chain, for example in the straight-chained alkanes (paraffins), or it could be the number of monomers in a homopolymer such as amylose. A homologue (also spelled as homolog) is a compound belonging to a homologous series.

Compounds within a homologous series typically have a fixed set of functional groups that gives them similar chemical and physical properties. (For example, the series of primary straight-chained alcohols has a hydroxyl at the end of the carbon chain.) These properties typically change gradually along the series, and the changes can often be explained by mere differences in molecular size and mass. The name "homologous series" is also often used for any collection of compounds that have similar structures or include the same functional group, such as the general alkanes (straight and branched), the alkenes (olefins), the carbohydrates, etc. However, if the members cannot be arranged in a linear order by a single parameter, the collection may be better called a "chemical family" or "class of homologous compounds" than a "series".

The concept of homologous series was proposed in 1843 by the French chemist Charles Gerhardt. A homologation reaction is a chemical process that converts one member of a homologous series to the next member.

== Examples ==
The homologous series of straight-chained alkanes begins methane (CH_{4}), ethane (C_{2}H_{6}), propane (C_{3}H_{8}), butane (C_{4}H_{10}), and pentane (C_{5}H_{12}). In that series, successive members differ in mass by an extra methylene bridge (-CH_{2}- unit) inserted in the chain. Thus the molecular mass of each member differs by 14 atomic mass units. Adjacent members in such a series, such as methane and ethane, are known as "adjacent homologues".

Normal boiling points of straight chain alkanes

Within that series, many physical properties such as boiling point gradually change with increasing mass. For example, ethane (C_{2}H_{6}), has a higher boiling point than methane (CH_{4}). This is because the London dispersion forces between ethane molecules are higher than that between methane molecules, resulting in stronger forces of intermolecular attraction, raising the boiling point.

Serine and homoserine are homologues.

Some important classes of organic molecules are derivatives of alkanes, such as the primary alcohols, aldehydes, and (mono)carboxylic acids form analogous series to the alkanes. The corresponding homologous series of primary straight-chained alcohols comprises methanol (CH_{4}O), ethanol (C_{2}H_{6}O), 1-propanol (C_{3}H_{8}O), 1-butanol, and so on. The single-ring cycloalkanes form another such series, starting with cyclopropane.

Homologous series	General formula	Repeating unit	Functional group(s)
Straight-chain alkanes	C_{n}H_{2n + 2} (n ≥ 1)	−CH_{2}−	H_{3}C− ... −CH_{3}
Straight-chain perfluoroalkanes	C_{n}F_{2n + 2} (n ≥ 1)	−CF_{2}−	F_{3}C− ... −CF_{3}
Straight-chain alkyl	C_{n}H_{2n + 1} (n ≥ 1)	−CH_{2}−	H_{3}C− ... −CH_{2}−
Straight-chain 1-alkenes	C_{n}H_{2n} (n ≥ 2)	−CH_{2}−	H_{2}C=CH− ... −CH_{3}
Cycloalkanes	C_{n}H_{2n} (n ≥ 3)	−CH_{2}−	Singly-bonded ring
Straight-chain 1-alkynes	C_{n}H_{2n − 2} (n ≥ 2)	−CH_{2}−	HC≡C− ... −CH_{3}
Polyacetylenes	C_{2n}H_{2n + 2} (n ≥ 2)	−CH=CH−	H_{3}C− ... −CH_{3}
Straight-chain primary alcohols	C_{n}H_{2n + 1}OH (n ≥ 1)	−CH_{2}−	H_{3}C− ... −OH
Straight-chain primary monocarboxylic acids	C_{n}H_{2n + 1}COOH (n ≥ 0)	−CH_{2}−	H_{3}C− ... −COOH
Polyethylene glycol oligomers	C_{2n}H_{4n+2}O_{n+1} (n ≥ 2)	−(O−CH_{2}−CH_{2})−	HO−CH_{2}−CH_{2}− ... −OH
Straight-chain azanes	N_{n}H_{n + 2} (n ≥ 1)	−NH−	H_{2}N− ... −NH_{2}

Biopolymers also form homologous series, for example the polymers of glucose such as cellulose oligomers starting with cellobiose, or the series of amylose oligomers starting with maltose, which are sometimes called maltooligomers. Homooligopeptides, oligopeptides made up of repetitions of only one amino acid can also be studied as homologous series.

== Inorganic homologous series ==
Homologous series are not unique to organic chemistry. Titanium, vanadium, and molybdenum oxides all form homologous series (e.g. V_{n}O_{2n − 1} for 2 < n < 10), called Magnéli phases, as do the silanes, Si_{n}H_{2n + 2} (with n up to 8) that are analogous to the alkanes, C_{n}H_{2n + 2}.

== Periodic table ==
On the periodic table, homologous elements share many electrochemical properties and appear in the same group (column) of the table. For example, all noble gases are colorless, monatomic gases with very low reactivity. These similarities are due to similar structure in their outer shells of valence electrons. Mendeleev used the prefix eka- for an unknown element below a known one in the same group.

== See also ==
- Analog
- Congener
- Ruddlesden-Popper phase
- Structure–activity relationship
