= CH =

CH, Ch, cH, or ch may refer to:

== Arts and entertainment ==
- CollegeHumor, a comedy website
- CH (television system), a defunct Canadian television system later known as E!

== Businesses ==
- Bemidji Airlines (IATA code CH)
- A product line by Carolina Herrera (fashion designer)

== In language ==
- Ch (digraph), considered a single letter in several Latin-alphabet languages
- Chamorro language (ISO 639 alpha-2 language code "ch")

== Science and technology ==
=== Chemistry ===
- The methylidyne radical (a carbyne), CH^{•} (or •CH), CH^{3•} (or ⫶CH)
- The methylidyne group ≡CH
- The methine group (methanylylidene, methylylidene) =CH−

=== Mathematics and computing ===
- Continuum hypothesis, in set theory
- CH register, the high byte of an X86 16-bit CX register
- Ch (computer programming), a cross-platform C/C++ interpreter
- Contraction hierarchies, in computer science, a speed-up technique for finding shortest paths in a graph

=== Medicine ===
- Congenital hypothyroidism, a condition of thyroid hormone deficiency present at birth
- French catheter scale (Charrière), a scale for medical catheters, also abbreviated as Fr
- Children's hospital

=== Military technology ===
- Chain Home, a World War II radar array

== Places ==
- Confoederatio Helvetica, the formal name for Switzerland, Latin in origin
  - ISO country code for Switzerland
  - .ch, the Internet country code top-level domain for Switzerland
- CH postcode area, the Chester postcode area in the UK
- China (FIPS and NATO country code CH)
- Chandigarh, a union territory of India
- Chapel Hill, North Carolina

== Other uses ==
- Chain (length), a unit of linear measure in the Imperial system
- Championship (dog), any dog qualifying for a championship at a conformation show, prefixed "Ch."
- Christ's Hospital, Horsham, West Sussex
- Companion of Honour, a British and Commonwealth honour
- Chaudhary, an honorific used in the Indian and Pakistani Punjab regions
- Metres above the Sea (Switzerland), an elevation reference system
- The logo for the Montreal Canadiens ice hockey team
- Adobe Character Animator, an Adobe software
- Charlotte Hornets, a professional basketball team in the NBA
