= Gallagher–Hollander degradation =

Chemical process

In the Gallagher–Hollander degradation (1946) pyruvic acid is removed from a linear aliphatic carboxylic acid yielding a new acid with two carbon atoms fewer. The original publication concerns the conversion of bile acid in a series of reactions: acid chloride (2) formation with thionyl chloride, diazoketone formation (3) with diazomethane, chloromethyl ketone formation (4) with hydrochloric acid, organic reduction of chlorine to methylketone (5), ketone halogenation to 6, elimination reaction with pyridine to enone 7 and finally oxidation with chromium trioxide to bisnorcholanic acid 8.
