= HD 200073 =

K-type giant in Microscopium

- Location of HD 200037 and ζ Microscopii on the map (circled)

Observation data Epoch J2000 Equinox ICRS
- Constellation: Microscopium
- Right ascension: 21^{h} 02^{m} 27.16546^{s}
- Declination: −38° 31′ 51.4904″
- Apparent magnitude (V): 5.94

Characteristics
- Evolutionary stage: red giant branch
- Spectral type: K2 III or K0 IV
- B−V color index: +1.15

Astrometry
| Radial velocity (R_{v}) | 39±10 km/s |
| Proper motion (μ) | RA: +156.842 mas/yr Dec.: −171.108 mas/yr |
| Parallax (π) | 14.358±0.0466 mas |
| Distance | 227.2 ± 0.7 ly (69.6 ± 0.2 pc) |
| Absolute magnitude (M_{V}) | +1.79 |

Details
| Mass | 1.03 M_{☉} |
| Radius | 9.15±0.46 R_{☉} |
| Luminosity | 28.8±0.3 L_{☉} |
| Surface gravity (log g) | 2.75 cgs |
| Temperature | 4,569±50 K |
| Metallicity [Fe/H] | −0.13 dex |
| Rotational velocity (v sin i) | 2.7±1.1 km/s |
| Age | 8.79^{+2.32}_{−2.04} Gyr |

Other designations
- 43 G. Microscopii, CD−39°14079, CPD−39°8841, GC 29351, HD 200073, HIP 103836, HR 8046, SAO 212653, TIC 115011683

Database references
| SIMBAD | data |

HD 200073 (HR 8046; 43 G. Microscopii) is a solitary star located in the southern constellation of Microscopium 8.5′ northwest of Zeta Microscopii. It is faintly visible to the naked eye as an orange-hued point of light with an apparent magnitude of 5.94. The object is located relatively close at a distance of 227 light-years based on Gaia DR3 parallax measurements, but it is receding with a heliocentric radial velocity of 39 km/s. At its current distance, HD 200073's brightness is diminished by an interstellar extinction of 0.13 magnitudes and it has an absolute magnitude of +1.79. It has a relatively high proper motion across the celestial sphere, moving at a rate of 213 mas/yr.

HD 200073 has a stellar classification of K2 III, indicating that it is an evolved K-type giant that has exhausted hydrogen at its core and left the main sequence. Astronomer David Stanley Evans gave a class of K0 IV, indicating that it is a slightly evolved subgiant that is ceasing hydrogen fusion at its core. HD 200073 is currently on the red giant branch, fusing hydrogen in a shell around an inert helium core. It has a comparable mass to the Sun but at the age of 8.79 billion years, it has expanded to 9.15 times the radius of the Sun. It radiates 28.8 times the luminosity of the Sun from its enlarged photosphere at an effective temperature of 4,569 K. HD 200073 is slightly metal-deficient with an iron abundance of [Fe/H] = −0.13 or 74.1% of the Sun's. It spins modestly with a projected rotational velocity of 2.7 km/s.
