= HD 201772 =

Star in the constellation Microscopium

- HD 201772 is the star circled in red

Observation data Epoch J2000 Equinox ICRS
- Constellation: Microscopium
- Right ascension: 21^{h} 13^{m} 03.06827^{s}
- Declination: −39° 25′ 29.7097″
- Apparent magnitude (V): 5.26

Characteristics
- Evolutionary stage: main sequence
- Spectral type: F5 IV-V or F6 V Fe−0.9 CH−0.5
- B−V color index: +0.44

Astrometry
Radial velocity (R_{v})	−41±1 km/s
Proper motion (μ)	RA: +185.855 mas/yr Dec.: −113.449 mas/yr
Parallax (π)	29.2823±0.0827 mas
Distance	111.4 ± 0.3 ly (34.15 ± 0.10 pc)
Absolute magnitude (M_{V})	+2.66

Details
Mass	1.5 M_{☉}
Radius	2.18±0.09 R_{☉}
Luminosity	7.83±0.04 L_{☉}
Surface gravity (log g)	3.91±0.09 cgs
Temperature	6,519±80 K
Metallicity [Fe/H]	−0.18±0.03 dex
Rotational velocity (v sin i)	10 km/s
Age	2.23±0.04 Gyr

Other designations
- 56 G. Microscopii, CD−39°14152, CPD−39°8898, GC 29640, HD 201772, HIP 104738, HR 8104, SAO 212793, LTT 8413

Database references
SIMBAD	data

HD 201772, also known as HR 8104, is a yellowish-white hued star located in the southern constellation of Microscopium. It has an apparent magnitude of 5.26, making it one of the brighter members of this generally faint constellation. The object is located relatively close at a distance of 111 light-years based on Gaia DR3 parallax measurements but is approaching closer with a heliocentric radial velocity of −41 km/s. At its current distance, HD 201772's brightness is diminished by 0.11 magnitudes due to interstellar dust.

The star has been given multiple stellar classifications over the years. It was given the luminosity class of a subgiant and main sequence star (IV/V; IV-V) and a dwarf (V). Most sources generally agree that it is a F5 star. Richard O. Gray and colleagues give HD 201772 a class of F6 V Fe−0.9 CH−0.5, which indicates that it is a F-type main-sequence star with an underabundance of iron and CH molecules in its spectrum.

It has 1.47 times the mass of the Sun and an enlarged radius of 2.2 R_{☉}. It radiates 7.8 times the luminosity of the Sun from its photosphere at an effective temperature of 6,519 K. At an age of 2.5 billion years, HD 201722 is currently 1.33 magnitudes above the ZAMS, consistent with a star that is evolving off the main sequence. The star has an iron abundance 66% that of the Sun, making it metal deficient. It spins modestly with a projected rotational velocity of 10 km/s.

HD 201772 is suspected to be a spectroscopic binary consisting of the subgiant described above and an ordinary F6 V star with a mass of 1.31 M_{☉}. However, the stars have no separation or an orbital period. This is because the companion might be a result of spectrum contamination, so HD 201772 is more likely to be a solitary star.
