= Kowalski ester homologation =

Chemical reaction

The Kowalski ester homologation is a chemical reaction for the homologation of esters.

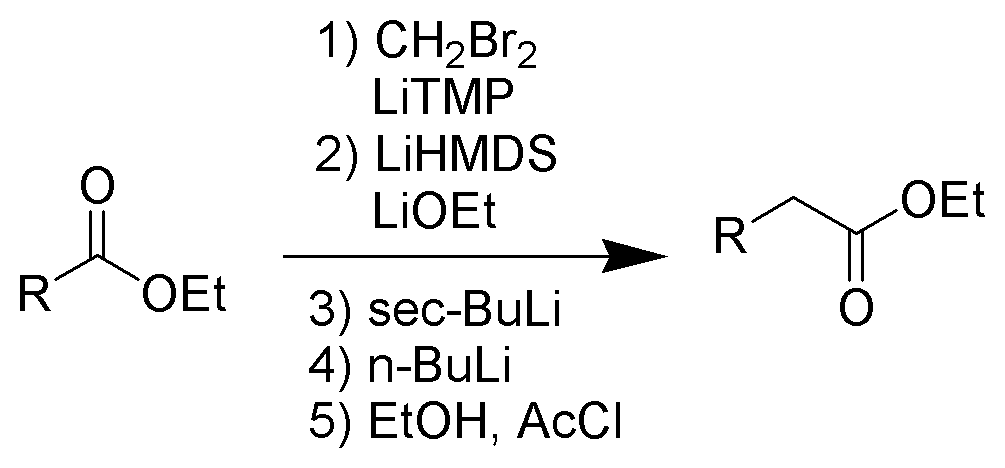
The Kowalski ester homologation

This reaction was designed as a safer alternative to the Arndt–Eistert synthesis, avoiding the need for diazomethane. The Kowalski reaction is named after its inventor, Conrad J. Kowalski.

== Reaction mechanism ==
The mechanism is disputed. One proposal:

1. Enolate formation: Ester is deprotonated at the α-position, to give enolate anion.
2. CH₂ insertion: Enolate reacts with dihalomethane, to introduce a –CH_{2}– group.
3. Rearrangement and stabilization
4. Under basic conditions, a homologated ester forms.

== Variations ==
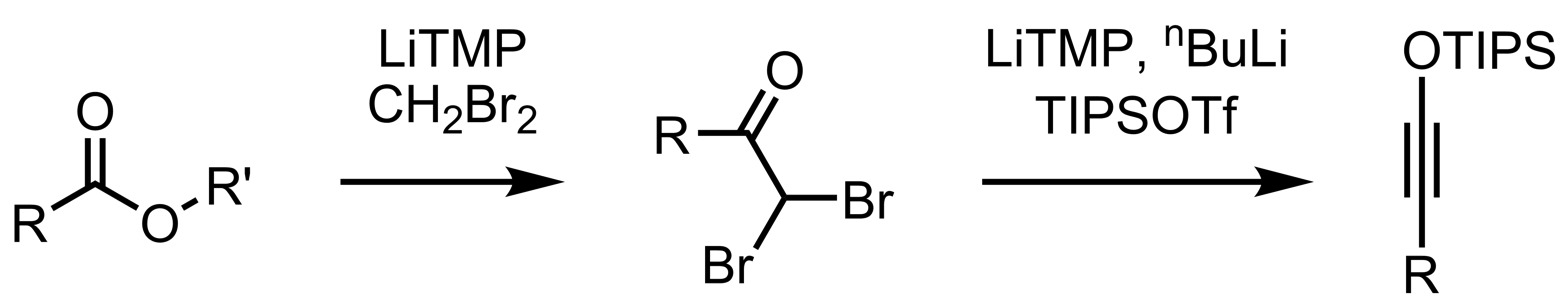
Proposed mechanism of the Kowalski ester homologation

By changing the reagent in the second step of the reaction, the Kowalski ester homologation can also be used for the preparation of silyl ynol ethers.

== See also ==
- Curtius rearrangement
