= Methoxymethylenetriphenylphosphorane =

Names
- IUPAC name Methoxymethylidene(triphenyl)-λ^{5}-phosphane

Identifiers
CAS Number	20763-19-3
3D model (JSmol)	Interactive image
ChemSpider	9923480
PubChem CID	11748776
CompTox Dashboard (EPA)	DTXSID901282268
- InChI: InChI=1S/C20H19OP/c1-21-17-22(18-11-5-2-6-12-18,19-13-7-3-8-14-19)20-15-9-4-10-16-20/h2-17H,1H3 Key: DYROHZMICXBUMX-UHFFFAOYSA-N
- SMILES: COC=P(C1=CC=CC=C1)(C2=CC=CC=C2)C3=CC=CC=C3

Properties
Chemical formula	C_{20}H_{19}OP
Molar mass	306.345 g·mol^{−1}
- Except where otherwise noted, data are given for materials in their standard state (at 25 °C [77 °F], 100 kPa). Infobox references

Methoxymethylenetriphenylphosphorane is a Wittig reagent used for the homologation of aldehydes, and ketones to extended aldehydes. The reagent is generally prepared and used in situ. It has blood-red color, indicative of destabilized ylides.

== Preparation ==
The reagent can be prepared in two steps from triphenylphosphine. The first step is P-alkylation with chloromethyl methyl ether.

PPh_{3} + CH_{3}OCH_{2}Cl → [CH_{3}OCH_{2}PPh_{3}]Cl

In the second step, the resulting phosphonium salt is deprotonated.

[CH_{3}OCH_{2}PPh_{3}]Cl + LiNR_{2} → CH_{3}OCH=PPh_{3} + LiCl + HNR_{2}

In place of chloromethyl methyl ether, a mixture of methylal and acetyl chloride can be used.

== Wittig–Levine reaction ==
The use of this chemical as a Wittig reagnt to homologate alehydes and ketones was first reported by Samuel Levine and this process is now sometimes called the Wittig–Levine reaction or the Wittig–Levine homologation The initial product of the Wittig reaction is an enol ether, which can be converted to the aldehyde by acid-catalyzed hydrolysis.

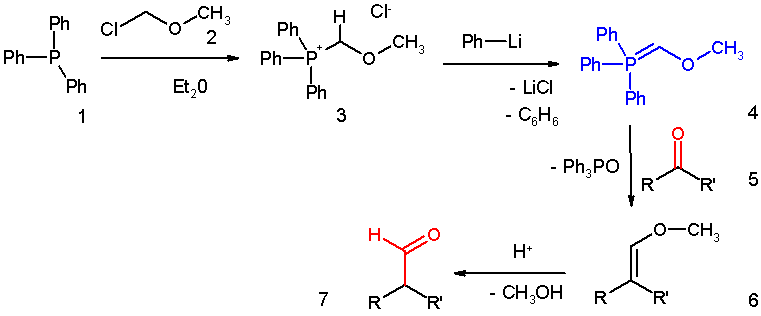

The initial report of the reaction demonstrated its use on the steroid tigogenone.

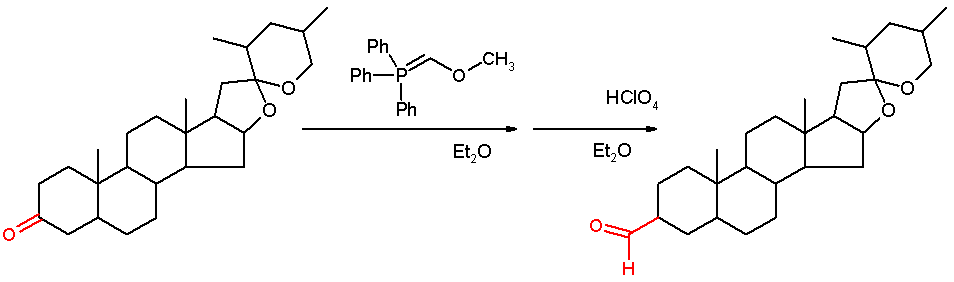

It was later used in the Wender Taxol total synthesis and the Stork quinine total synthesis.
