= Methylidyne group =

Chemical group (≡CH)

In organic chemistry, a methylidyne group or just methylidyne is a neutral part of a molecule (a substituent or functional group) with formula ≡CH, consisting of a carbon atom bonded to a hydrogen atom by one single bond and to the rest of the molecule by one triple bond. For example, a methylidyne group is present in n-methylidyne-1-hexanaminium, H_{3}C−(CH_{2})_{5}−N^{+}≡CH.

The name "methylidyne" is also used for the methylidyne radical (carbyne) ⫶CH, the same two atoms not bound to any other atom.

== See also ==
- Methylene group or methylidene =CH_{2}
- Methylene bridge or methanediyl −CH_{2}−
- Methine group, methylylidene, or methanylylidene =CH−
- Methanetriyl group >CH−
- Methylylidyne group ≡C−
