= Arndt–Eistert reaction =

Conversion of a carboxylic acid to its homologue

Arndt-Eistert reaction
| Named after | Fritz Arndt, Bernd Eistert |
| Reaction type | Homologation reaction |

Identifiers
| Organic Chemistry Portal | arndt-eistert-synthesis |
| RSC ontology ID | RXNO:0000063 |

In organic chemistry, the Arndt–Eistert reaction is the conversion of a carboxylic acid to its homologue. It is named for the German chemists Fritz Arndt (1885–1969) and Bernd Eistert (1902–1978). The method entails treating an acid chloride with diazomethane. It is a popular method of producing β-amino acids from α-amino acids.

== Conditions ==
Aside from the acid chloride substrate, three reagents are required: diazomethane, water, and a metal catalyst. Each has been well investigated.

The diazomethane is required in excess so as to react with the HCl formed previously. Not taking diazomethane in excess results in HCl reacting with the diazoketone to form chloromethyl ketone and N_{2}. Mild conditions allow this reaction to take place while not affecting complex or reducible groups in the reactant-acid.

The reaction requires the presence of a nucleophile (water). A metal catalyst is required. Usually Ag_{2}O is chosen but other metals and even light effect the reaction.

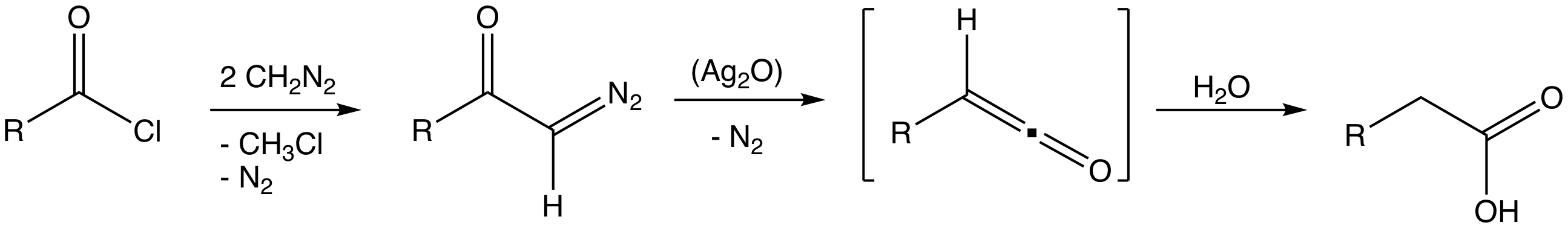
Arndt-Eistert reaction with ketene intermediate.

=== Variants ===
The preparation of the beta-amino acid from phenylalanine illustrates the Arndt–Eistert synthesis carried out with the Newman–Beal modification, which involves the inclusion of triethylamine in the diazomethane solution. Either triethylamine or a second equivalent of diazomethane will scavenge HCl, avoiding the formation of α-chloromethylketone side-products.

Diazomethane is the traditional reagent, but analogues can also be applied. Diazomethane is toxic and potentially violently explosive, which has led to safer alternative procedures, For example, diazo(trimethylsilyl)methane has been demonstrated.

Acid anhydrides can be used in place of acid chloride. The reaction yields a 1:1 mixture of the homologated acid and the corresponding methyl ester.

This method can also be used with primary diazoalkanes, to produce secondary α-diazo ketones. However, there are many limitations. Primary diazoalkanes undergo azo coupling to form azines; thus the reaction conditions must be altered such that acid chloride is added to a solution of diazoalkane and triethylamine at low temperature. In addition, primary diazoalkanes are very reactive, incompatible with acidic functionalities, and will react with activated alkenes including α,β-unsaturated carbonyl compounds to give 1,3-dipolar cycloaddition products.

An alternative to the Arndt–Eistert reaction is the Kowalski ester homologation, which also involves the generation of a carbene equivalent but avoids diazomethane.

== Reaction mechanism ==
The acid chloride suffers attack by diazomethane with loss of HCl. The alpha-diazoketone (RC(O)CHN_{2}) product undergoes the metal-catalyzed Wolff rearrangement to form a ketene, which hydrates to the acid. The rearrangement leaves untouched the stereochemistry at the carbon alpha to the acid chloride.

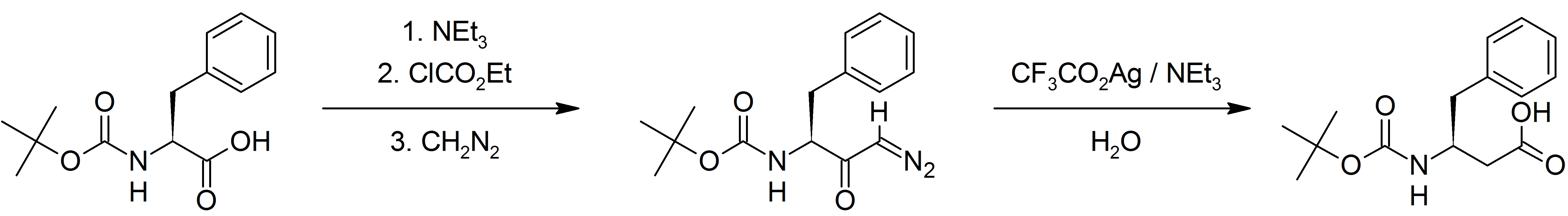

== Historical readings ==
- Arndt, F.; Eistert, B. (1935). "Ein Verfahren zur Überführung von Carbonsäuren in ihre höheren Homologen bzw. deren Derivate" [A process for the conversion of carboxylic acids into their higher homologs or their derivatives]. Ber. Dtsch. Chem. Ges. (in German). 68 (1): 200–208. doi:10.1002/cber.19350680142.
- Bachmann, W. E.; Struve, W. S. (1942). "The Arndt–Eistert Reaction". Org. React. 1: 38.

== See also ==
- Curtius rearrangement
- Kowalski ester homologation
- Lossen rearrangement
- Nierenstein reaction
- Wolff rearrangement
