= Fritz Arndt =

German chemist (1885-1969)

Fritz Georg Arndt
- Born: 6 July 1885; Hamburg, German Empire
- Died: 8 December 1969 (aged 84); Hamburg, West Germany
- Education: University of Geneva, University of Bern; University of Freiburg
- Spouse: Julia (nee Heimann)
- Children: Heinz; Walter; Bettina
- Scientific career
- Fields: Chemistry
- Workplaces: University of Greifswald, University of Kiel, University of Breslau, University of Oxford; University of Istanbul; University of Hamburg
- Doctoral advisor: Ludwig Gattermann

Fritz Georg Arndt (6 July 1885 – 8 December 1969) was a German chemist recognised for his contributions to synthetic methodology, who together with Bernd Eistert discovered the Arndt-Eistert synthesis.

== Life ==
Fritz Arndt was born on 6 July 1885, in Hamburg but started his chemistry studies at the University of Geneva followed by the University of Bern and receiving his PhD from the University of Freiburg for his work with Ludwig Gattermann in 1908.

His academic career started with short term work at the University of Greifswald, University of Kiel and University of Breslau In March 1914 he married Julia Heimann, with whom he had two sons, Heinz and Walter and a daughter, Bettina. When World War I began in August 1914 he enlisted to fight for the Kaiser however was rejected because of his varicose veins. In October 1915 he was appointed to the newly created chair in chemistry at the University of Istanbul. During his time in Istanbul from 1915 till 1918 he established a close contact to the Turkish chemists in Istanbul. He returned to the University of Breslau where he stayed until he was forced to abandon his office in 1933 by the newly elected Nazi government.

After his emigration in 1933 and a short stay at the Oxford University he went back to Istanbul where he stayed from 1934 till 1955. He had great influence on the development of chemistry in Turkey.

In 1955 he came back to West Germany, where he professor at the University of Hamburg. Fritz Arndt died on 8 December 1969 in Hamburg.

Arndt's elder son Heinz Wolfgang Arndt (1915–2002) was a noted Australian economist based in Canberra while his granddaughter Bettina (born 1949) is a noted Australian journalist and sex therapist. Arndt's second son Walter Werner Arndt (1916–2011) was an outstanding translator of German and Russian poetry into English and ended up as the chair of the Russian department at Dartmouth College.

Arndt's daughter Bettina Arndt Jessell (1917–2003) was a famous paintings conservator who practiced in both the United Kingdom and the United States. Jessell was a prized pupil of the renowned paintings conservator Helmut Ruhemann (1891–1973) from 1937 to 1939. Ruhemann was conservator at the Kaiser Frederich Museum in Berlin and later worked on paintings from the collections of the National Gallery, Tate Gallery, Glasgow Art Gallery, and the Courtauld Institute. Jessell's career included successful private studios in the United Kingdom and Washington, DC, USA (1981–2002), positions at the National Gallery of Art, Washington, DC and the Getty Museum. She was a mentor to countless individuals. Currently her students are placed in noted cultural institutions in the United States and abroad. In 1996, Jessell received the Sheldon and Caroline Keck Award from the American Institute for the Conservation of Historic and Artistic Works for excellence in education and training of conservation professionals.
