= Bernd Eistert =

German chemist (1902–1978)

- Born: 9 November 1902; Ohlau, Germany now Olawa, Poland
- Died: 22 May 1978 (aged 75); Saarbrücken, Germany
- Education: University of Breslau
- Scientific career
- Workplaces: BASF, Ludwigshafen, Darmstadt University of Technology, University of Saarbrücken
- Doctoral advisor: Fritz Arndt

Bernd Eistert (9 November 1902 – 22 May 1978) was a German chemist. Together with Fritz Arndt he discovered the Arndt-Eistert synthesis.

== Life ==
Eistert was born in Ohlau (Oława), Prussian Silesia. After he received his PhD in Breslau in 1927 for his work with Fritz Arndt he worked for the BASF company from 1929 till 1943. He worked at the Technical University of Darmstadt from 1943 till 1957 when he changed to the University of Saarbrücken, where he retired in 1971.
