= HD 201852 =

K-type giant star in Microscopium

- Location of HD 201852 on the map (circled)

Observation data Epoch J2000 Equinox ICRS
- Constellation: Microscopium
- Right ascension: 21^{h} 13^{m} 18.96155^{s}
- Declination: −36° 25′ 24.7016″
- Apparent magnitude (V): 5.95±0.01

Characteristics
- Evolutionary stage: red giant branch
- Spectral type: K0 III
- U−B color index: +0.74
- B−V color index: +0.98

Astrometry
Radial velocity (R_{v})	0.4±0.4 km/s
Proper motion (μ)	RA: +33.411 mas/yr Dec.: +3.122 mas/yr
Parallax (π)	8.9286±0.038 mas
Distance	365 ± 2 ly (112.0 ± 0.5 pc)
Absolute magnitude (M_{V})	+0.73

Details
Mass	1.87 M_{☉}
Radius	9.89±0.50 R_{☉}
Luminosity	58.0±0.5 L_{☉}
Surface gravity (log g)	2.80±0.08 cgs
Temperature	4,984±34 K
Metallicity [Fe/H]	−0.02±0.03 dex
Rotational velocity (v sin i)	<1.0 km/s
Age	1.58 Gyr

Other designations
- 57 G. Microscopii, CD−36°14676, CPD−36°9343, GC 29648, HD 201852, HIP 104752, HR 8108, SAO 212800, TIC 159690250

Database references
SIMBAD	data

HD 201852 (HR 8108; 57 G. Microscopii) is a solitary star located in the southern constellation of Microscopium. It is faintly visible to the naked eye as an orange-hued point of light with an apparent magnitude of 5.95. Gaia DR3 parallax measurements imply a distance of 365 light-years and it is slowly receding with a heliocentric radial velocity of 0.4 km/s. At its current distance, HD 201852's brightness is diminished by an interstellar extinction of 0.11 magnitudes and it has an absolute magnitude of +0.73.

HD 201852 has a stellar classification of K0 III, indicating that it is an evolved K-type giant that has exhausted hydrogen at its core and left the main sequence. It has 1.87 times the mass of the Sun but at the age of 1.58 billion years, it has expanded to 9.89 times the radius of the Sun. It radiates 58 times the luminosity of the Sun from its enlarged photosphere at an effective temperature of 4,984 K. HD 201852 has a near solar metallicity at [Fe/H] = −0.02 and it spins too slowly for its projected rotational velocity to be measured accurately; it has been given an upper limit of 1 km/s. Based on its kinematics and elemental abundances, HD 201852 is said to be part of the thin disk population.
