= Delta Microscopii =

Star in the constellation Microscopium

- Location of δ Microscopii (circled)

Observation data Epoch J2000.0 Equinox J2000.0 (ICRS)
- Constellation: Microscopium
- Right ascension: 20^{h} 06^{m} 01.14597^{s}
- Declination: −30° 07′ 30.4290″
- Apparent magnitude (V): 5.68

Characteristics
- Spectral type: K0/1 III
- B−V color index: +1.03

Astrometry
Proper motion (μ)	RA: +33.46 mas/yr Dec.: −67.91 mas/yr
Parallax (π)	10.82±0.64 mas
Distance	300 ± 20 ly (92 ± 5 pc)
Absolute magnitude (M_{V})	+0.87

Orbit
Period (P)	1,599.3±8.15 d
Eccentricity (e)	0.2
Periastron epoch (T)	2453878.5 ± 3.59 JD
Argument of periastron (ω) (secondary)	194.4±2.40°
Semi-amplitude (K_{1}) (primary)	5,581.3±5.42 km/s

Details

δ Mic A
Mass	1.96 M_{☉}
Radius	10.87 R_{☉}
Luminosity	57 L_{☉}
Surface gravity (log g)	2.45 cgs
Temperature	4,805 K
Metallicity [Fe/H]	0.03±0.11 dex
Rotational velocity (v sin i)	2.12 km/s

Other designations
- δ Mic, CD−39°14089, FK5 3683, HD 200718, HIP 104148, HR 8070, SAO 212709

Database references
SIMBAD	data

δ Microscopii, Latinised as Delta Microscopii, is a faint, orange hued binary star system in the constellation Microscopium, marking the eyepiece end of the "microscope". It is just visible to the naked eye with an apparent visual magnitude of +5.68. Based upon an annual parallax shift of 10.82 mas as seen from the Earth, it is roughly 300 light years from the Sun. At that distance, the visual magnitude is diminished by an extinction factor of 0.142 due to interstellar dust.

This is a single-lined spectroscopic binary with an orbital period of 4.4 years and an eccentricity of 0.2. The visible component is an evolved K-type giant star with a stellar classification of K0/1 III. It is currently on the horizontal branch and thus is generating energy through helium fusion at its core. Delta Microscopii has nearly twice the mass of the Sun and has expanded to 11 times the Sun's radius. The star is radiating 57 times the Sun's luminosity from its enlarged photosphere at an effective temperature of 4,805 K.
