= HD 197630 =

Star in the constellation of Microscopium

- HD 197630 is the star circled in red

Observation data Epoch J2000 Equinox J2000
- Constellation: Microscopium
- Right ascension: 20^{h} 46^{m} 20.06779^{s}
- Declination: −39° 11′ 57.3590″
- Apparent magnitude (V): 5.47±0.01

Characteristics
- Evolutionary stage: main sequence
- Spectral type: B8/9 V
- B−V color index: −0.10
- Variable type: suspected SPB

Astrometry
Radial velocity (R_{v})	−30±7.4 km/s
Proper motion (μ)	RA: +50.451 mas/yr Dec.: −27.196 mas/yr
Parallax (π)	9.9354±0.1022 mas
Distance	328 ± 3 ly (101 ± 1 pc)
Absolute magnitude (M_{V})	+0.49

Details
Mass	2.83±0.04 M_{☉}
Radius	2.56±0.13 R_{☉}
Luminosity	73.5 L_{☉}
Surface gravity (log g)	4.11±0.14 cgs
Temperature	10,965^{+255}_{−250} K
Metallicity	59% solar
Metallicity [Fe/H]	−0.23 dex
Rotational velocity (v sin i)	290 km/s
Age	113 Myr

Other designations
- 23 G. Microscopii, CD−39°13960, CPD−39°8771, FK5 3658, GC 28927, HD 197630, HIP 102497, HR 7933, SAO 212416

Database references
SIMBAD	data

HD 197630, also known as HR 7933 or rarely 23 G. Microscopii, is a probable astrometric binary located in the southern constellation of Microscopium. The visible component is a bluish-white hued star that is faintly visible to the naked eye with an apparent magnitude of 5.47. Based on parallax measurements from the Gaia satellite, the system is estimated to be 328 light years away. However, it is drifting closer with a heliocentric radial velocity of −30 km/s. At its current distance, HD 197630's brightness is diminished by 0.11 magnitudes due to interstellar dust. A 2012 multiplicity survey failed to confirm the velocity variations.

HD 197630 has a stellar classification of B8/9 V, indicating that it is a B-type star with the characteristics of a B8 and B9 main sequence star. It has 2.83 times the mass of the Sun and 2.56 times the Sun's radius. It radiates 73.5 times the luminosity of the Sun from its photosphere at an effective temperature of 10,965 K. The star is estimated to be 113 million years old, having completed roughly half of its main sequence lifetime. HD 19730 is spinning rapidly with a projected rotational velocity of 290 km/s.

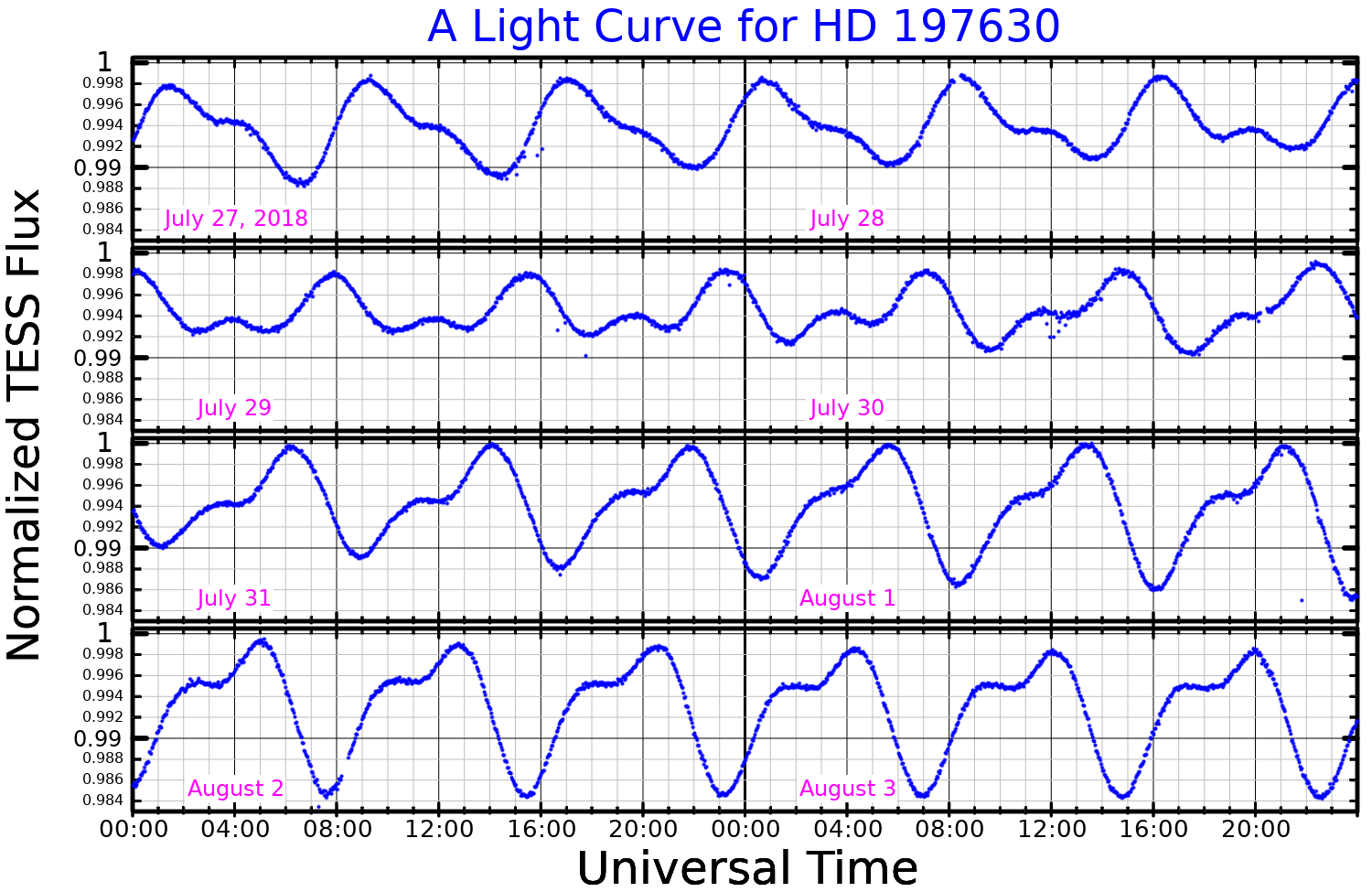
A light curve for HD 197630, plotted from TESS data

The object was in a 2002 Hipparcos variability survey and as a result, the AAVSO cataloged HD 197630 as a suspected variable star that fluctuates by 0.005 magnitudes within 7.71 hours. However, subsequent observations have not confirmed this. Further data from the Transiting Exoplanet Survey Satellite suggests that HD 197630 may be a slowly pulsating B-type star plus a variable star with rotation modulations.
