= HD 198357 =

K-type giant in the constellation Microscopium

- Location of HD 198357 on the map (circled)

Observation data Epoch J2000 Equinox ICRS
- Constellation: Microscopium
- Right ascension: 20^{h} 51^{m} 00.75817^{s}
- Declination: −37° 54′ 47.9922″
- Apparent magnitude (V): 5.50±0.01

Characteristics
- Spectral type: K3 III or K3 II
- B−V color index: +1.38

Astrometry
Radial velocity (R_{v})	16.5±2.9 km/s
Proper motion (μ)	RA: −7.436 mas/yr Dec.: −17.374 mas/yr
Parallax (π)	5.7348±0.0797 mas
Distance	569 ± 8 ly (174 ± 2 pc)
Absolute magnitude (M_{V})	−0.75

Details
Mass	1.81±0.44 M_{☉}
Radius	37.8±1.9 R_{☉}
Luminosity	417^{+16}_{−15} L_{☉}
Surface gravity (log g)	1.06 cgs
Temperature	4,318±51 K
Metallicity [Fe/H]	−0.12 dex
Rotational velocity (v sin i)	<1.0 km/s

Other designations
- 28 G. Microscopii, CD−38°14250, CPD−38°8121, GC 29053, HD 198357, HIP 102916, HR 7971, SAO 212488

Database references
SIMBAD	data

HD 198357 (HR 7971; 28 G. Microscopii) is a solitary star located in the southern constellation of Microscopium. It is faintly visible to the naked eye as an orange-hued point of light with an apparent magnitude of 5.50. Gaia DR3 parallax measurements imply a distance of 569 light-years and the object is currently receding with a heliocentric radial velocity of 16.5 km/s. At its current distance, HD 198357's brightness is diminished by 0.18 magnitudes due to interstellar extinction and it has an absolute magnitude of −0.75.

HD 198357 has a stellar classification of K3 III, indicating that it is an evolved K-type giant star. David Stanley Evans gave a classification of K3 II, indicating a bright giant. It has 1.81 times the mass of the Sun but it has expanded to 37.8 times the radius of the Sun. It radiates 417 times the luminosity of the Sun from its photosphere at an effective temperature of 4,318 K. HD 198357 is slightly metal deficient with an iron abundance three-quarters that of the Sun or [Fe/H] = −0.12 and it spins too slowly for its projected rotational velocity to be measured accurately. HD 198357 has a peculiar velocity of 27.7+3.9
−4.1 km/s, indicating that it may be a runaway star (46% chance).
