= HD 196737 =

K-type giant; Microscopium

- Location of HD 196737 (circled)

Observation data Epoch J2000 Equinox ICRS
- Constellation: Microscopium
- Right ascension: 20^{h} 40^{m} 19.82792^{s}
- Declination: −33° 25′ 54.6462″
- Apparent magnitude (V): 5.47±0.01

Characteristics
- Evolutionary stage: red giant branch
- Spectral type: K1 III
- U−B color index: +1.08
- B−V color index: +1.12

Astrometry
Radial velocity (R_{v})	14.2±2.8 km/s
Proper motion (μ)	RA: +21.953 mas/yr Dec.: +34.487 mas/yr
Parallax (π)	13.5581±0.0691 mas
Distance	241 ± 1 ly (73.8 ± 0.4 pc)
Absolute magnitude (M_{V})	+1.17

Details
Mass	1.4±0.1 M_{☉}
Radius	11.5 R_{☉}
Luminosity	43.7^{+3.1}_{−2.9} L_{☉}
Surface gravity (log g)	2.46±0.34 cgs
Temperature	4,681±122 K
Metallicity [Fe/H]	−0.02 dex
Rotational velocity (v sin i)	<1 km/s
Age	3.4±0.6 Gyr

Other designations
- 13 G. Microscopii, CD−33°15119, CPD−33°5922, FK5 1540, GC 28776, HD 196737, HIP 102014, HR 7893, SAO 212333

Database references
SIMBAD	data

HD 196737, also designated as HR 7893, is a solitary orange hued star located in the southern constellation of Microscopium. It has an apparent magnitude of 5.47, allowing it to be faintly visible to the naked eye. The object is located relatively close at a distance of 241 light years based on Gaia DR3 parallax measurements, but is receding with a heliocentric radial velocity of 14.2 km/s. At its current distance, HD 196737's brightness is diminished by 0.14 magnitudes due to interstellar dust. It has an absolute magnitude of 1.17.

This is an evolved giant star with a stellar classification of K1 III. HD 196737 is estimated to be 3.4 billion years old based on asteroseismologic measurements, enough for it to cool and expand onto the red giant branch; it is now fusing a hydrogen shell around an inert helium core. It has 1.4 time the mass of the Sun and an enlarged radius of 11.5 R_{☉}. It radiates 43.7 times the luminosity of the Sun from its photosphere at an effective temperature of 4,681 K. HD 196737 has a solar metallicity — what astronomers dub chemical elements heavier than helium. The star has a projected rotational velocity too low to be measured accurately.
