= HD 201647 =

High proper motion F-type star

- Location of HD 201647 on the map (circled)

Observation data Epoch J2000 Equinox ICRS
- Constellation: Microscopium
- Right ascension: 21^{h} 12^{m} 13.71281^{s}
- Declination: −40° 16′ 09.7010″
- Apparent magnitude (V): 5.83 (5.83 - 5.86)

Characteristics
- Evolutionary stage: main sequence
- Spectral type: F5 V
- B−V color index: +0.45
- Variable type: suspected

Astrometry
Radial velocity (R_{v})	4.5±0.9 km/s
Proper motion (μ)	RA: +58.359 mas/yr Dec.: −218.773 mas/yr
Parallax (π)	31.4586±0.0401 mas
Distance	103.7 ± 0.1 ly (31.79 ± 0.04 pc)
Absolute magnitude (M_{V})	+3.33

Details
Mass	1.28 M_{☉}
Radius	1.47^{+0.07}_{−0.04} R_{☉}
Luminosity	3.79±0.01 L_{☉}
Surface gravity (log g)	4.21±0.01 cgs
Temperature	6,637±80 K
Metallicity [Fe/H]	+0.06±0.01 dex
Rotational velocity (v sin i)	25.1±2.5 km/s
Age	916 Myr

Other designations
- 55 G. Microscopii, NSV 25506, CD−40°14216, CPD−40°9488, GC 29614, GJ 9726, HD 201647, HIP 104680, HR 8100, SAO 230575, LTT 8410, TIC 159670453

Database references
SIMBAD	data

HD 201647 (HR 8100; Gliese 9726; LTT 8410) is a solitary star located in the southern constellation of Microscopium. It is faintly visible to the naked eye as a yellowish-white-hued star with an apparent magnitude of 5.83. The object is located relatively close at a distance of light-years based on Gaia DR3 parallax measurements, but it is receding with a heliocentric radial velocity of 4.5 km/s. At its current distance, HD 201647's brightness is diminished by 0.11 magnitudes due to interstellar extinction and it has an absolute magnitude of +3.33. It has a relatively high proper motion across the celestial sphere, moving at a rate of 226.331 mas/yr.

HD 201647 has a stellar classification of F5 V, indicating that it is an ordinary F-type main-sequence star that is generating energy via hydrogen fusion at its core. It has 1.28 times the mass of the Sun and 1.47 times the radius of the Sun. It radiates 3.79 times the luminosity of the Sun from its photosphere at an effective temperature of 6,637 K. HD 201647 is slightly metal enriched with an iron abundance of [Fe/H] = +0.06 or 115% of the Sun's. It is estimated to be 916 million years old and it spins modestly with a projected rotational velocity of 25.1 km/s.

In the discovery paper for Lacaille 8760, HD 201647 was reported to be a variable star that varied between 5.83 and 5.86 in the visual passband. As of 2004 however, it has not been confirmed to be variable.
