= HD 194783 =

HgMn star; Microscopium

- Location of HD 194783 on the map (circled)

Observation data Epoch J2000 Equinox J2000
- Constellation: Microscopium
- Right ascension: 20^{h} 28^{m} 46.74360^{s}
- Declination: −35° 35′ 45.1068″
- Apparent magnitude (V): 6.08±0.01

Characteristics
- Evolutionary stage: main sequence
- Spectral type: B8 II/III or B9pHgMn
- B−V color index: −0.11

Astrometry
Radial velocity (R_{v})	−9.7±1.2 km/s
Proper motion (μ)	RA: +2.959 mas/yr Dec.: −21.638 mas/yr
Parallax (π)	4.3936±0.0714 mas
Distance	740 ± 10 ly (228 ± 4 pc)
Absolute magnitude (M_{V})	−0.59 or −1.10

Details
Mass	4.03±0.05 M_{☉}
Radius	4.19±0.21 R_{☉}
Luminosity	390±12 L_{☉}
Surface gravity (log g)	3.75 cgs
Temperature	14,028 K
Metallicity [Fe/H]	−0.20 dex
Rotation	6 d
Rotational velocity (v sin i)	≤30 km/s
Age	70 Myr

Other designations
- 2 G. Microscopii, CD−36°14166, CPD−36°9170, FK5 3637, GC 28464, HD 194783, HIP 101017, HR 7817, SAO 212160, TIC 34864575

Database references
SIMBAD	data

HD 194783 (HR 7817; 2 G. Microscopii) is a solitary star located in the southern constellation of Microscopium near the border with Sagittarius. It is barely visible to the naked eye as a bluish-white-hued point of light with an apparent magnitude of 6.08. The object is located relatively far at a distance of 740 light-years based on Gaia DR3 parallax measurements, but it is drifting closer with a heliocentric radial velocity of −9.7 km/s. At its current distance, HD 194783's brightness is diminished by an interstellar extinction of 0.31 magnitudes and it has an absolute magnitude of either −0.59 or −1.10, depending on the source.

HD 194783 has a stellar classification of B8 II/III, indicating that it is an evolved B-type star with the blended luminosity class of a bright giant and a lower luminosity giant star. It has also been given a class of B9pHgMn, indicating that it is a chemically peculiar mercury-manganese star. It has 4.03 times the mass of the Sun and a slightly enlarged radius 4.19 times that of the Sun's. It radiates 390 times the luminosity of the Sun from its photosphere at an effective temperature of 14,028 K. The heavy metal (iron) to hydrogen ratio–what astronomers dub as the star's metallicity–is 63% that of the Sun's. HD 194783 is estimated to be approximately 70 million years old.

In 1989, HD 194783 was reported to be a spectrum variable with a period of 6 days. The projected rotational velocity of the star is not known, but it is said to be no higher than 30 km/s. HD 194783 was also observed to have a relatively weak magnetic field of about −43 gauss.
