= Methine group =

Chemical group (=CH–)

Methine or methylylidene (IUPAC)

In organic chemistry, a methine group or methine bridge is a trivalent functional group =CH−, derived formally from methane. It consists of a carbon atom bound by two single bonds and one double bond, where one of the single bonds is to a hydrogen. The group is also called methyne or methene, but its IUPAC systematic name is methylylidene or methanylylidene.

This group is sometimes called "methylidyne", however that name belongs properly to either the methylidyne group ≡CH (connected to the rest of the molecule by a triple bond) or to the methylidyne radical ⫶CH (the two atoms as a free molecule with dangling bonds).

The name "methine" is also widely used in non-systematic nomenclature for the methanetriyl group (IUPAC): a carbon atom with four single bonds, where one bond is to a hydrogen atom (>CH−).

== Methine-based dyes ==
Thioflavin, a zeromethine dye

.

SYBR green I, a monomethine dye

.

Several commercial dyes are defined by the presence of methine groups. These compounds are the polymethine dyes. They feature a positively- and negatively-charged heterocyclic rings linked by (CH)_{n} (n = 0, 1, 2, 3...).

== Overlapping methines ==
Two or more methine bridges can overlap, forming a chain or ring of carbon atoms connected by alternating single and double bonds, as in piperylene H_{2}C=CH−CH=CH−CH_{3}, or the compound

Every carbon atom in this molecule is a methine carbon atom, except for three; the two that are directly above and attached to the two nitrogen atoms and not to any hydrogen atoms, and the carbon attached to two hydrogen atoms and one nitrogen atom (far right bottom). There is a five-carbon-atom poly-methine chain in the center of this molecule.

Chains of alternating single and double bonds often form conjugated systems. When closed, as in benzene (=CH−CH=)_{3}, they often give aromatic character to the compound.

== See also ==
- Methyl group −CH_{3}
- Methylene group or methylidene =CH_{2}
- Methylene bridge or methanediyl −CH_{2}−
- Methanetriyl group >CH−
- Methylylidyne group ≡C−
