= HD 203949 =

Star in the constellation Microscopium

- Location of HD 203949 on the map (circled)

Observation data Epoch J2000 Equinox ICRS
- Constellation: Microscopium
- Right ascension: 21^{h} 26^{m} 22.8745^{s}
- Declination: −37° 49′ 45.950″
- Apparent magnitude (V): 5.62±0.01

Characteristics
- Evolutionary stage: red giant branch or red clump
- Spectral type: K2III

Astrometry
Radial velocity (R_{v})	−83.50±0.16 km/s
Proper motion (μ)	RA: 168.257 mas/yr Dec.: −11.075 mas/yr
Parallax (π)	12.6806±0.0577 mas
Distance	257 ± 1 ly (78.9 ± 0.4 pc)
Absolute magnitude (M_{V})	+1.10

Details
Mass	1.00±0.16 M_{☉}
Radius	10.30±0.51 R_{☉}
Luminosity (bolometric)	43.34±4.27 L_{☉}
Surface gravity (log g)	2.415±0.044 cgs
Temperature	4618±113 K
Metallicity [Fe/H]	0.17±0.07 dex
Age	7.29±3.06 Gyr

Other designations
- CD−38 14551, HIP 105854, HR 8200, TYC 7979-47-1, GSC 07979-00047, 2MASS J21262286-3749458, Gaia DR2 6583094222249556224

Database references
SIMBAD	data

HD 203949 is a K-type giant star 257 light-years away in the constellation of Microscopium. Its surface temperature is 4618±113 K. It is either on the red giant branch fusing hydrogen in a shell around a helium core, or more likely a red clump star currently fusing helium in its core. HD 203949 is enriched in heavy elements relative to the Sun, with a metallicity ([Fe/H]) of 0.17±0.07 dex. As is common for red giants, HD 203949 has an enhanced concentration of sodium and aluminium compared to iron.

Multiplicity surveys did not find any stellar companions around HD 203949 as of 2019.

== Planetary system ==
In 2014, one planet orbiting HD 203949 was discovered by the radial velocity method. The planet is highly unlikely to have survived the red giant stage of stellar evolution on the present orbit. It is likely to be recently scattered from a wider orbit.

The planetary system configuration is favourable for direct imaging of exoplanets in the near future, and was included in the top ten easiest targets known by 2018.

The HD 203949 planetary system
Companion (in order from star)	Mass	Semimajor axis (AU)	Orbital period (days)	Eccentricity	Inclination (°)	Radius
HIP 105854b	>8.2±0.2 (Note: Planetary minimal mass must be revised down by 30% according to Campante et al.) M_{J}	0.81±0.03	184.2±0.5	0.02±0.03	—	—
