= HD 198716 =

Star in the constellation of Microscopium

- HD 198716 is the star circled in red

Observation data Epoch J2000 Equinox ICRS
- Constellation: Microscopium
- Right ascension: 20^{h} 53^{m} 40.18538^{s}
- Declination: −39° 48′ 35.5092″
- Apparent magnitude (V): 5.33±0.01

Characteristics
- Evolutionary stage: red giant branch
- Spectral type: K2 III
- B−V color index: +1.32

Astrometry
Radial velocity (R_{v})	20.1±2.8 km/s
Proper motion (μ)	RA: +43.548 mas/yr Dec.: −97.023 mas/yr
Parallax (π)	8.2435±0.0774 mas
Distance	396 ± 4 ly (121 ± 1 pc)
Absolute magnitude (M_{V})	−0.1

Details
Mass	2.45±0.12 M_{☉}
Radius	23.9 R_{☉}
Luminosity	160±3 L_{☉}
Surface gravity (log g)	1.41±0.01 cgs
Temperature	4,453±122 K
Metallicity [Fe/H]	−0.04 dex
Rotational velocity (v sin i)	2±1.3 km/s
Age	622^{+275}_{−64} Myr

Other designations
- 33 G. Microscopii, CD−40°14078, CPD−40°9399, GC 29127, HD 198716, HIP 103127, HR 7987, SAO 212522

Database references
SIMBAD	data

HD 198716, also known as HR 7987 or 33 G. Microscopii, is a solitary star located in the southern constellation of Microscopium. Eggen (1993) lists it as a member of the Milky Way's old disk population.

The object has an apparent magnitude of 5.33, making it faintly visible to the naked eye under ideal conditions. Based on parallax measurements from the Gaia satellite, it is estimated to be 396 light years away from the Solar System. However, it is drifting closer with a somewhat constrained heliocentric radial velocity of 20 km/s. At its current distance, HD 198716's brightness is diminished by 0.1 magnitude due to interstellar dust.

This is an evolved red giant star with a stellar classification of K2 III. It has 2.45 times the mass of the Sun but at an age of 622 million years, it has expanded to 23.9 times the Sun's radius. It radiates 160 times the luminosity of the Sun from its photosphere at an effective temperature of 4,453 K, giving it an orange hue. HD 198716 is slightly metal deficient and spins moderately with a projected rotational velocity of 2 km/s.
