= HD 196917 =

Suspected variable star in Microscopium

- Location of HD 196917 on the map (circled)

Observation data Epoch J2000 Equinox J2000
- Constellation: Microscopium
- Right ascension: 20^{h} 41^{m} 23.65766^{s}
- Declination: −31° 35′ 53.8334″
- Apparent magnitude (V): 5.74

Characteristics
- Evolutionary stage: AGB
- Spectral type: M1 III or M0 III
- B−V color index: +1.53
- Variable type: suspected

Astrometry
| Radial velocity (R_{v}) | −97.3±2.3 km/s |
| Proper motion (μ) | RA: +109.914 mas/yr Dec.: −60.256 mas/yr |
| Parallax (π) | 7.6563±0.0891 mas |
| Distance | 426 ± 5 ly (131 ± 2 pc) |
| Absolute magnitude (M_{V}) | +0.04 |

Details
| Mass | 1.27 M_{☉} |
| Radius | 44.2±2.2 R_{☉} |
| Luminosity | 620^{+45}_{−20} L_{☉} |
| Surface gravity (log g) | 1.40 cgs |
| Temperature | 3,908±122 K |
| Metallicity [Fe/H] | −0.28 dex |

Other designations
- 17 G. Microscopii, NSV 25227, CD−32°16130, CPD−32°6177, FK5 3652, GC 28808, HD 196917, HIP 102092, HR 7909, SAO 212345, TIC 441396067

Database references
| SIMBAD | data |

HD 196917 (HR 7909; 17 G. Microscopii; NSV 25227) is a solitary star located in the southern constellation of Microscopium. It is faintly visible to the naked eye as a red-hued point of light with an apparent magnitude of 5.74. Gaia DR3 parallax measurements imply a distance of 426 light-years and it is rapidly approaching the Solar System with a heliocentric radial velocity of −97.3 km/s. At its current distance, HD 196917's brightness is diminished by 0.13 magnitudes due to interstellar extinction and it has an absolute magnitude of +0.04.

HD 196917 has a stellar classification of either M1 III or M0 III, indicating that it is an evolved M-type giant. It is currently on the asymptotic giant branch, fusing hydrogen and helium shells around an inert carbon core. It has 1.27 times the mass of the Sun but it has expanded to 44.2 times the radius of the Sun. It radiates 620 times the luminosity of the Sun from its enlarged photosphere at an effective temperature of 3,908 K. HD 196917 is metal deficient with an iron abundance of [Fe/H] = −0.28 or 52.5% of the Sun's.

The variability of the star was first detected in 1997 by the Hipparcos mission. It found variations between 5.82 and 5.86 in the Hipparcos passband. Koen & Lyer (2002) observed visual variations from the star and found that HD 196917 varies by 0.009 magnitudes within 21.01 hours. As of 2004, its variability has not been confirmed.
