= Beta Microscopii =

Constellation Microscopium star

β Microscopii
- Location of β Microscopii (circled)

Observation data Epoch J2000.0 Equinox J2000.0 (ICRS)
- Constellation: Microscopium
- Right ascension: 20^{h} 51^{m} 58.7618^{s}
- Declination: −33° 10′ 40.705″
- Apparent magnitude (V): 6.05±0.01

Characteristics
- Evolutionary stage: main sequence
- Spectral type: A1 IV
- B−V color index: +0.03

Astrometry
Radial velocity (R_{v})	−12±4.3 km/s
Proper motion (μ)	RA: +7.712 mas/yr Dec.: −5.568 mas/yr
Parallax (π)	6.5022±0.0451 mas
Distance	502 ± 3 ly (154 ± 1 pc)
Absolute magnitude (M_{V})	+0.22

Details
Mass	2.96 M_{☉}
Radius	3.5±0.1 R_{☉}
Luminosity	77.25 L_{☉}
Surface gravity (log g)	3.58 cgs
Temperature	8,942 K
Metallicity [Fe/H]	0.00 dex
Rotational velocity (v sin i)	275±3 km/s
Age	337 Myr

Other designations
- β Mic, 32 Microscopii, CD−33°15245, HD 198529, HIP 102989, HR 7979, SAO 212499

Database references
SIMBAD	data

Beta Microscopii (Beta Mic), Latinized from β Microscopii, is a solitary star in the constellation Microscopium. It is close to the lower limit of stars that are visible to the naked eye having an apparent visual magnitude of 6.05 Based upon an annual parallax shift of 6.5022 mas as seen from Earth, this star is located 502 light years away from the Sun. At that distance, the visual magnitude is diminished by an extinction factor of 0.19 due to interstellar dust.

Beta Mic has a stellar classification of A1 IV, indicating that it is an evolved A-type subgiant. Older sources give it a class of A2 Vn, suggesting that it is an A-type main-sequence star with nebulous absorption lines due to rapid rotation. Consistent with the older classification, the star is spinning rapidly with a projected rotational velocity of 275 km/s. The star has 2.96 times the mass of the Sun and due to its evolved status, has a radius of 3.5 R_{☉}. It radiates at 77.2 times the luminosity of the Sun from its photosphere at an effective temperature of 8,942 K, giving a white hue. Beta Mic has a solar metallicity and is estimated to be around 340 million years old.
