= AV Microscopii =

Star in the constellation Microscopium

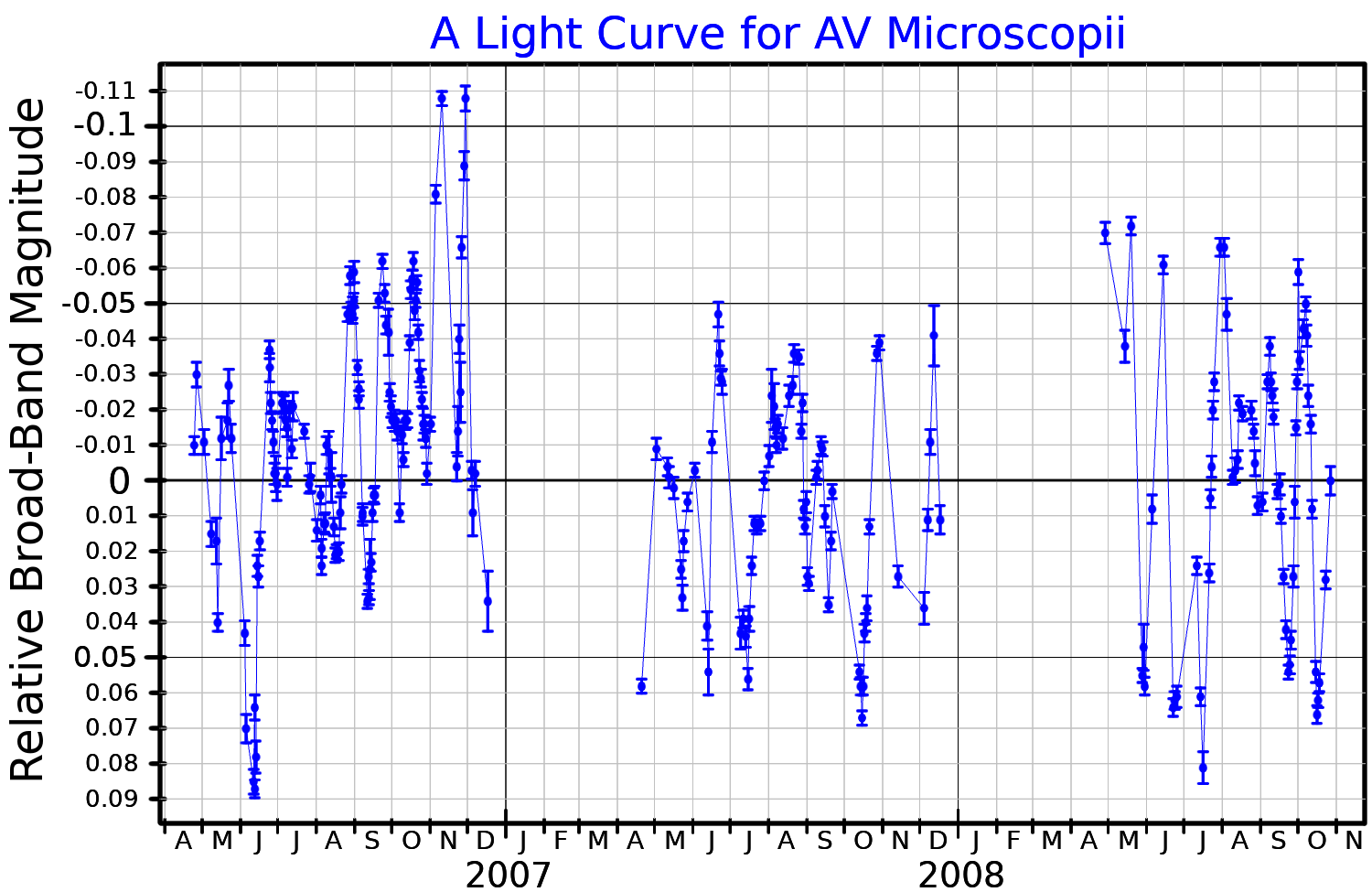
- A broad-band optical light curve for AV Microscopii, plotted from data published by Tabur et al. (2009)

Observation data Epoch J2000.0 Equinox J2000.0 (ICRS)
- Constellation: Microscopium
- Right ascension: 20^{h} 41^{m} 24.66513^{s}
- Declination: −42° 08′ 01.6196″
- Apparent magnitude (V): 6.28 (6.25 – 6.35)

Characteristics
- Spectral type: M4 III
- B−V color index: 1.584±0.019
- Variable type: LC:

Astrometry
Radial velocity (R_{v})	−22.9±0.9 km/s
Proper motion (μ)	RA: +46.627 mas/yr Dec.: −32.891 mas/yr
Parallax (π)	4.3815±0.1715 mas
Distance	740 ± 30 ly (228 ± 9 pc)
Absolute magnitude (M_{V})	−1.40

Details
Mass	2.4 M_{☉}
Radius	77.5+3.2 −16.4 R_{☉}
Luminosity	849±38 L_{☉}
Surface gravity (log g)	2.14 cgs
Temperature	3,539+448 −70 K
Metallicity [Fe/H]	−0.10 dex

Other designations
- AV Mic, CD−42°15034, HD 196829, HIP 102096, SAO 230323

Database references
SIMBAD	data

AV Microscopii is a variable star in the southern constellation of Microscopium. It is a dim, red-hued star near the lower limit of visibility to the naked eye with a baseline apparent visual magnitude of 6.28. The star is located approximately 740 light years away from the Sun, based on parallax, but is moving closer with a radial velocity of −23 km/s. It is a member of the Milky Way's old disk population.

Based upon a stellar classification of M4 III, this is an aging red giant star, having exhausted the supply of hydrogen at its core then expanded to around 78 times the Sun's radius. Earlier it had been classed as M3 II, with the luminosity class of a bright giant. Samus et al. (2017) have it tentatively classified as an irregular variable of subtype LC, suggesting this is a supergiant star. It is a pulsating variable with multiple periods discovered, ranging in apparent visual magnitude between 6.25 and 6.35. The star radiates 849 times the luminosity of the Sun from its enlarged photosphere at an effective temperature of 3,539 K.

Pulsation periods
Period (days)	22.3	23.3	30.3	31.0	32.3	45.0	110.7
Amplitude (mag.)	0.038	0.050	0.017	0.027	0.019	0.025	0.018
