= Methylene (compound) =

Chemical group (=CH2)

- Skeletal formula of methylene

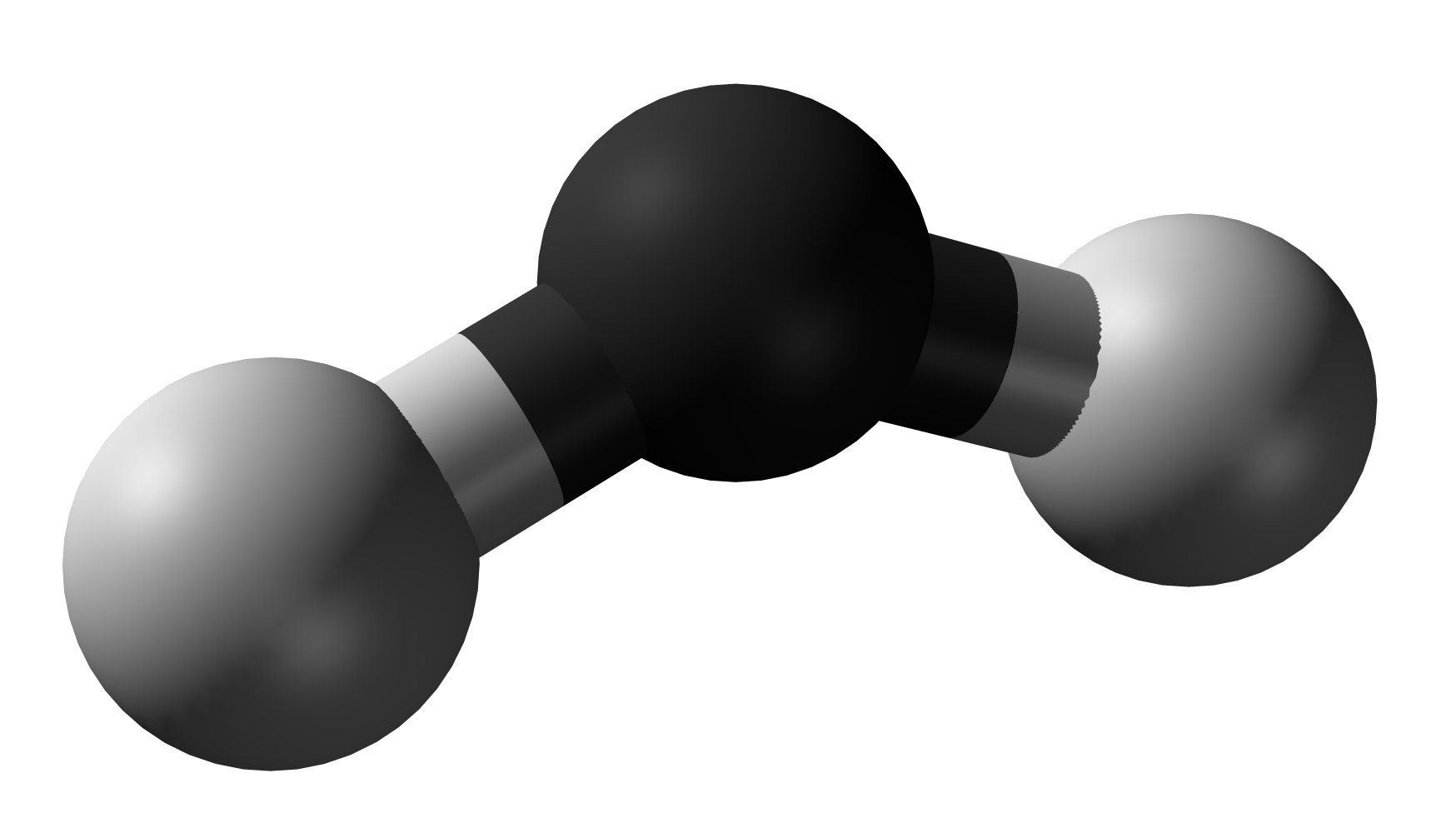
Ball-and-stick model of triplet methylene
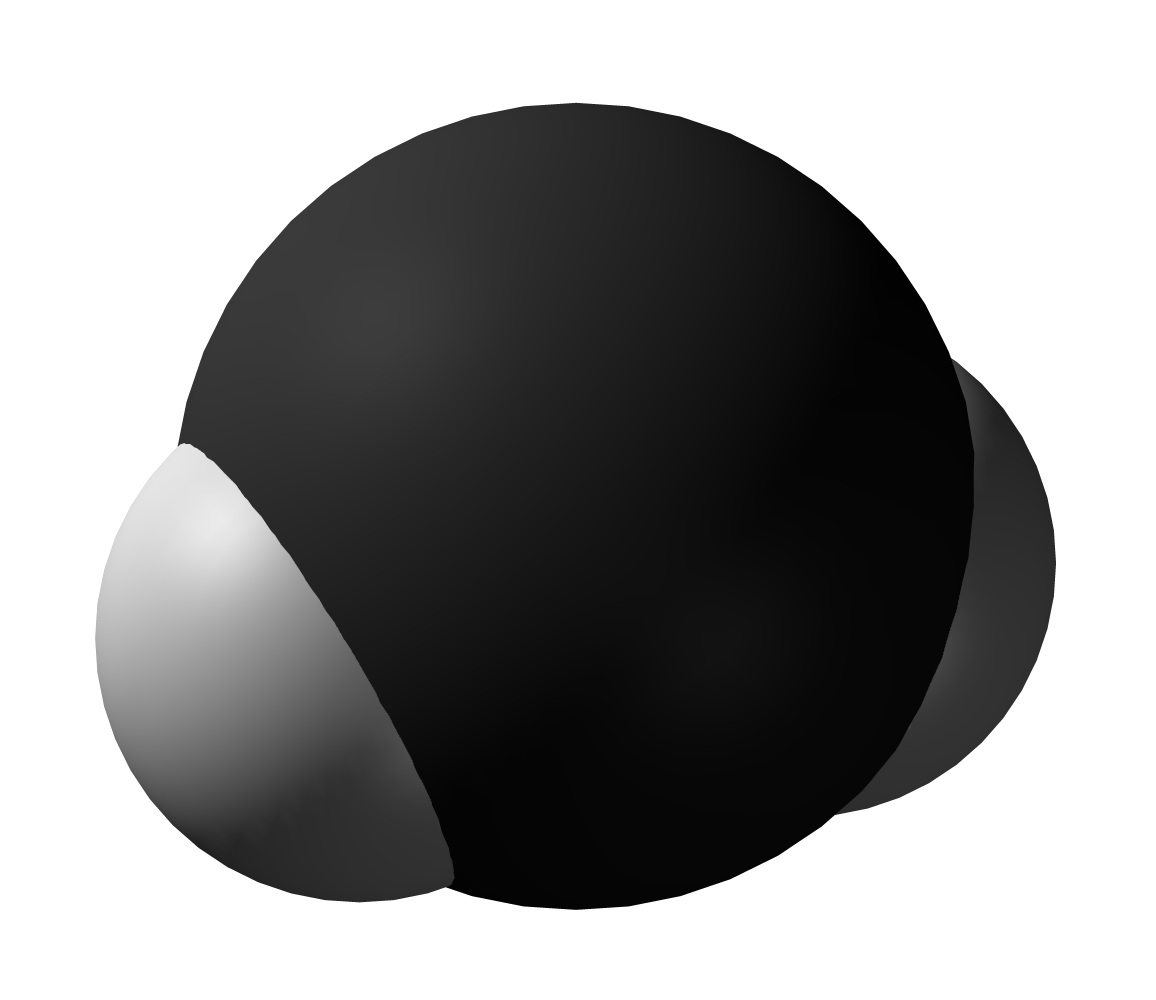
Space filling model of triplet methylene

Names
- IUPAC name Dihydridocarbon(2•)
- Preferred IUPAC name Methylidene
- Other names: Dihydridocarbon; Carbene; Methene

Identifiers
CAS Number	2465-56-7
3D model (JSmol)	Interactive image
Beilstein Reference	1696832
ChEBI	CHEBI:29357
ChemSpider	109779
Gmelin Reference	56
MeSH	carbene
PubChem CID	123164
CompTox Dashboard (EPA)	DTXSID50179391
- InChI: InChI=1S/CH2/h1H2 Key: HZVOZRGWRWCICA-UHFFFAOYSA-N
- SMILES: [CH2]

Properties
Chemical formula	CH^{•}_{2}
Molar mass	14.027 g·mol^{−1}
Appearance	Colourless gas
Solubility in water	Reacts
Conjugate acid	Methenium

Thermochemistry
Std molar entropy (S^{⦵}_{298})	193.93 J/(K⋅mol)
Std enthalpy of formation (Δ_{f}H^{⦵}_{298})	386.39 kJ/mol

Related compounds
Related compounds	Methyl (CH_{3}); Methylidyne (CH); Carbide (C); Silylene (SiH_{2})
- Except where otherwise noted, data are given for materials in their standard state (at 25 °C [77 °F], 100 kPa). Infobox references

Methylene (IUPAC name: methylidene, also called carbene or methene) is an organic compound with the chemical formula CH_{2} (also written [CH_{2}] and not to be confused with compressed hydrogen, which is also denoted CH_{2}). It is a colourless gas that fluoresces in the mid-infrared range, and only persists in dilution, or as an adduct.

Methylene is the simplest carbene. It is usually detected only at very low temperatures or as a short-lived intermediate in chemical reactions.

== Nomenclature ==
The trivial name carbene is the preferred IUPAC name. The systematic names methylidene and dihydridocarbon, valid IUPAC names, are constructed according to the substitutive and additive nomenclatures, respectively.

Methylidene is viewed as methane with two hydrogen atoms removed. By default, this name pays no regard to the radicality of the methylene. Although in a context where the radicality is considered, it can also name the non-radical excited state, whereas the radical ground state with two unpaired electrons is named methanediyl.

Methylene is also used as the trivial name for the substituent groups methanediyl (>(CH_{2})), and methylidene (=CH_{2}). It was introduced as early as 1835 by French chemists Jean-Baptiste Dumas and Eugene Peligot after determining methanol's chemical structure. They coined it the Greek μέθυ (methy) "wine" and ὕλη (hȳlē) "forest, firewood, matter" with the intention of highlighting its origins, 'alcohol made from wood (substance)'.

=== Methylidene group ===
The blue part of this diagram of a propene molecule is a methylidene group.

A methylidene group is any part of a molecule that consists of a =CH_{2} group.

In contrast, methylene is connected to the rest of the molecule by two single bonds. The distinction is often important, because the double bond is chemically different from two single bonds.

3-Methylidenecycloprop-1-ene is named as a cyclopropene with a methylidene substituent.

The same name (methylidene) was used for the distinct molecule CH_{2}, also known as carbene. Formerly the methylene name was used for all three isomers (methylene, methylidene, and carbene).

Many organic compounds are named and classified as if they were the result of substituting a methylidene group for two adjacent hydrogen atoms of some parent molecule (even if they are not actually obtained that way). Thus, for example, methylenecyclopropene is named after cyclopropene.

== Preparation ==
Methylene can be prepared by decomposition of compounds with a methylidene or methanediyl group, such as ketene (ethenone) (CH_{2}=CO), diazomethane (linear CH_{2}=N_{2}), diazirine (cyclic [−CH_{2}−N=N−]) and diiodomethane (I−CH_{2}−I). The decomposition can be effected by photolysis, photosensitized reagents (such as benzophenone), or thermal decomposition. Methylene can be produced by photolysis of diazomethane. In its ultraviolet spectrum, gaseous methylene absorbs at around 141.5 nm. It was shown to have a bond angle of about 140°.

The reactions of methylene were also studied around 1960 by infrared spectroscopy using matrix isolation experiments.

== Chemical properties ==
=== Radical character ===
Many of methylene's electronic states lie relatively close to each other, giving rise to varying degrees of radical chemistry. The ground state is a triplet radical with two unpaired electrons (^{3}B_{1}), and the first excited state is a singlet non-radical (ã^{1}A_{1}). With the singlet non-radical only 38 kJ above the ground state, a sample of methylene exists as a mixture of electronic states even at room temperature, giving rise to complex reactions. For example, reactions of the triplet radical with non-radical species generally involves abstraction, whereas reactions of the singlet non-radical not only involves abstraction, but also insertion or addition.

[CH_{2}]^{2•}(^{3}B_{1})^{+} + H_{2}O → [CH_{3}]^{•} + [HO]^{•}
[CH_{2}](ã^{1}A_{1}) + H_{2}O → H_{2}CO + H_{2} (or H_{3}COH)

The singlet state is also more stereospecific than the triplet.

Methylene spontaneously autopolymerises to form various excited oligomers, the simplest of which, is the excited form of the alkene ethylene. The excited oligomers, decompose rather than decay to a ground state. For example, the excited form of ethylene decomposes to acetylene and atomic hydrogen.

2 CH_{2} → H_{2}CCH^{•}_{2} → HCCH + 2 H

Unsolvated, excited methylene will form stable ground state oligomers.

2 CH^{•}_{2} → H_{2}CCH_{2}

=== Structure ===
The ground state of methylene has an ionisation energy of 10.396 eV. It has a bent configuration, with H−C−H angle of 133.84°, and is thus paramagnetic. The correct prediction of this angle was an early success of ab initio quantum chemistry methods. Conversion to a linear configuration requires only 5.5 kcal/mol.

The singlet state has a slightly higher energy (by about 9 kcal/mol) than the triplet state, and its H−C−H angle is smaller, about 102°. In dilute mixtures with an inert gas, the two states will convert to each other until reaching an equilibrium.

=== Chemical reactions ===
==== Organic chemistry ====
Neutral methylene complexes undergo different chemical reactions depending on the pi character of the coordinate bond to the carbon centre. A weak contribution, such as in diazomethane, yields mainly substitution reactions, whereas a strong contribution, such as in ethenone, yields mainly addition reactions. Upon treatment with a standard base, complexes with a weak contribution convert to a metal methoxide. With strong acids (e.g., fluorosulfuric acid), they can be protonated to give CH_{3}L^{+}. Oxidation of these complexes yields formaldehyde, and reduction yields methane.

Free methylene undergoes the typical chemical reactions of a carbene. Addition reactions are very fast and exothermic.

When the methylene molecule is in its state of lowest energy, the unpaired valence electrons are in separate atomic orbitals with independent spins, a configuration known as triplet state.

Methylene may gain an electron yielding a monovalent anion methanidyl (CH^{•−}_{2}), which can be obtained as the tetramethylammonium ((CH_{3})_{4}N^{+}) salt by the reaction of phenyl sodium (C_{6}H_{5}Na) with tetramethylammonium bromide ((CH_{3})_{4}N^{+}Br^{−}). The ion has bent geometry, with a H−C−H angle of about 103°.

==== Reactions with inorganic compounds ====
Methylene is also a common ligand in coordination compounds, such as copper methylene CuCH_{2}.

Methylene can bond as a terminal ligand, which is called methylidene, or as a bridging ligand, which is called methanediyl.

== In popular culture ==
The formula of the methylene molecule (CH_{2}) was mentioned as part of a Disney comic by the Donald Duck character in a 1944 story called The Mad Chemist by Carl Barks, in a humorous vein. In the same spirit, the comic was eventually cited in the scientific literature by Peter Gaspar and George S. Hammond. The comic has been cited in other sources since, including a widely adopted textbook in organic chemistry by Robert Morrison and Robert Boyd.

== See also ==
- Methyl radical
- Methylidyne radical
- Atomic carbon
- Alkene
- Methylene group
- Dichlorocarbene
