= Ketone halogenation =

Organic reaction: addition of a halogen to the alpha carbon of a ketone

In organic chemistry, α-keto halogenation is a special type of halogenation. The reaction may be carried out under either acidic or basic conditions in an aqueous medium with the corresponding elemental halogen. In this way, chloride, bromide, and iodide (but notably not fluoride) functionality can be inserted selectively in the alpha position of a ketone.

The position alpha to the carbonyl group (C=O) in a ketone is easily halogenated. This is due to its ability to form an enolate (C=C−O^{−}) in basic solution, or an enol (C=C−OH) in acidic solution. An example of alpha halogenation is the mono-bromination of acetone ((CH_{3})_{2}C=O), carried out under either acidic or basic conditions, to give bromoacetone:

Acidic (in acetic acid):

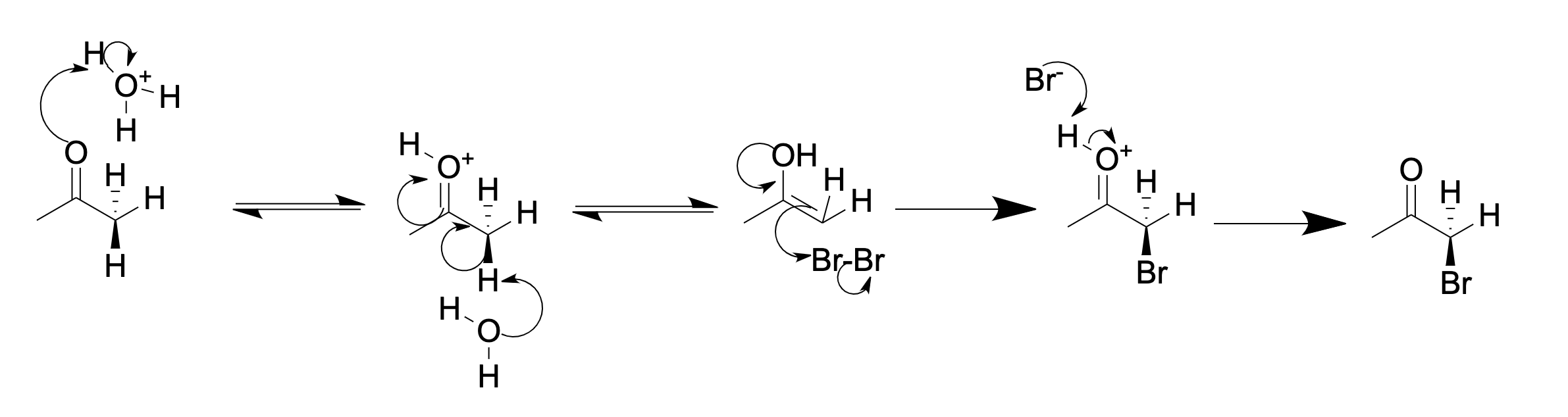
Reaction mechanism for the bromination of acetone while in the presence of acetic acid

Basic (in aqueous NaOH):

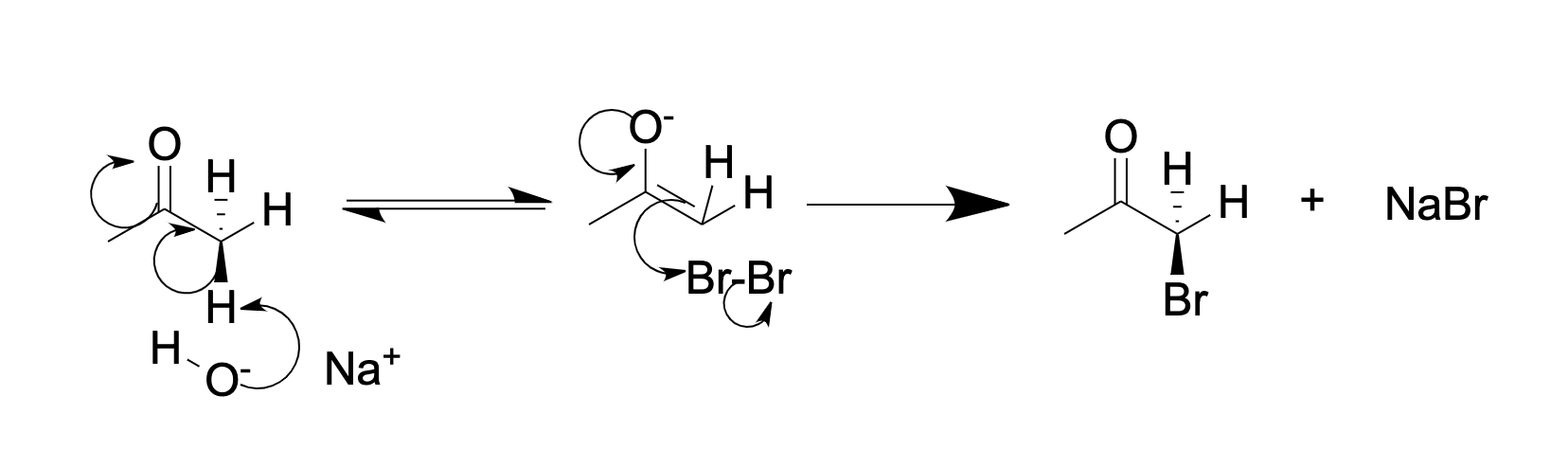
Reaction mechanism for the bromination of acetone while in the presence of aqueous NaOH

In acidic solution, usually only one alpha hydrogen is replaced by a halogen, as each successive halogenation is slower than the first. The halogen decreases the basicity of the carbonyl oxygen, thus making protonation less favorable. However, in basic solutions, successive halogenation is more rapid due to inductive electron withdrawal by the halogen. This makes the remaining hydrogens more acidic. In the case of methyl ketones, this reaction often occurs a third time to form a ketone trihalide, which can undergo rapid substitution with water to form a carboxylate (−C(=O)O^{−}) in what is known as the haloform reaction.

The regioselectivity also differs: The halogenation of an unsymmetrical ketone in acid results in the more substituted alkyl group being halogenated. A second equivalent of halogen results in the halogenation of the other alkyl substituent (without the halogen). In contrast, in basic solutions, an unsymmetrical ketone halogenates at the less substituted alkyl group. Subsequent halogenation (which usually cannot be stopped by control of stoichiometry) occurs at the position which already has a halogen substituent, until all hydrogens have been replaced by halogen atoms. For methyl alkyl ketones (2-alkanones), the haloform reaction proceeds to give the carboxylic acid selectively.

== Halogenation of α,β-unsaturated ketones ==
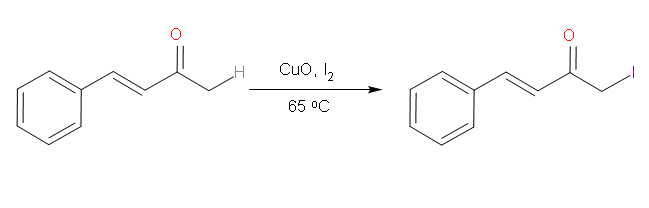
Halogenation of α,β-unsaturated ketone

On α,β-Unsaturated ketones or enones, it's possible to halogenate with iodine selectively on the more saturated alpha on the ketone selectively over the unsaturated side. Iodine is preferred due to it being more reactive than alkyl bromides which makes this reaction quite useful. By using CuO in conjunction with I_{2}, it is possible to achieve this reaction under relatively mild conditions. This reaction undergoes a very reactive enol mechanism, facilitated by the CuO, which allows for the selective addition of I_{2} on the saturated alpha carbon of the ketone. However, the effectiveness of this reaction depends on the presence of aryl functional groups.

== Applications in green chemistry ==
Alpha halogenated products are very useful compounds as they have high reactivity which makes them very prone to reacting. Alpha halogenated ketones react with nucleophiles to create many valuable compounds. However, many of the current method for ketone halogenation use hazardous chemicals, have complex procedures, and/or require a long time to go to completion. Additionally, the polar solvents that are primarily used (DMF, DMSO, and CH_{3}CN) are major environmental pollutants.

An experiment conducted by Meshram et al. in 2005 investigated making ketone halogenation a greener reaction, according to the principles of green chemistry. Meshram et al. investigated alternatives to the hazardous chemicals that are primarily used in ketone halogenation, finding that room temperature ionic liquids were a promising option. Room temperature ionic liquids are interesting prospects as they have unique chemical and physical properties, and their properties can be modified by changing the cations that are attached. Additionally, these ionic liquids have high polarity and their ability to solubilize organic and inorganic molecules leads to enhanced reaction rates, which makes them more desirable.

Many experiments found that ionic liquids with N-halosuccinimides as the solvent were an effective, greener alternative to conventional solvents. This process also resulted in enhanced yields, reduced reaction time, simplified the procedure, used less harmful chemicals (no strong acids), and did not require catalysts, all of which made the process greener.
