= Zeta Microscopii =

Star in the constellation Microscopium

- Location of ζ Microscopii (circled)

Observation data Epoch J2000.0 Equinox J2000.0 (ICRS)
- Constellation: Microscopium
- Right ascension: 21^{h} 02^{m} 57.95290^{s}
- Declination: −38° 37′ 53.2099″
- Apparent magnitude (V): 5.31

Characteristics
- Spectral type: F5 V
- B−V color index: +0.41

Astrometry
Radial velocity (R_{v})	+4.6 km/s
Proper motion (μ)	RA: −29.16 mas/yr Dec.: −108.85 mas/yr
Parallax (π)	28.27±0.33 mas
Distance	115 ± 1 ly (35.4 ± 0.4 pc)
Absolute magnitude (M_{V})	2.58

Details
Mass	1.40 M_{☉}
Luminosity	7.5 L_{☉}
Surface gravity (log g)	3.97 cgs
Temperature	6,627±225 K
Metallicity [Fe/H]	−0.13 dex
Rotational velocity (v sin i)	44.4±2.2 km/s
Age	2.2 Gyr

Other designations
- ζ Mic, CD−39°14089, FK5 790, GC 29363, HD 200163, HIP 103882, HR 8048, SAO 212666

Database references
SIMBAD	data

ζ Microscopii, Latinised as Zeta Microscopii, is a solitary, yellow-white hued star in the southern constellation of Microscopium. It is faintly visible to the naked eye with an apparent visual magnitude of +5.31. Based upon an annual parallax shift of 28.27 mas as seen from the Earth, it is 115 light years from the Sun. The star is moving away from the Sun with a radial velocity of +4.6 km/s.

This is an F-type main-sequence star with a stellar classification of F5 V. This indicates that, at the age of 2.2 billion years, it is still generating energy through hydrogen fusion at its core. It is radiating 7.5 times the Sun's luminosity from its photosphere at an effective temperature of 6,471 K. The star has an estimated 1.4 times the mass of the Sun and is spinning with a moderately high projected rotational velocity of 44.4 km/s.
