= Methylene bridge =

Any part of a molecule with the chemical formula –CH2–

The methylene bridge (methanediyl group)

In chemistry, a methylene bridge is part of a molecule with formula −CH_{2}−. The carbon atom is connected by single bonds to two other distinct atoms in the rest of the molecule. A methylene bridge is often called a methylene group or simply methylene, as in "methylene chloride" (dichloromethane CH_{2}Cl_{2}). As a bridge in other compounds, for example in cyclic compounds, it is given the name methano. However, the term methylidene group (not to be confused with the term methylene group, nor the carbene methylidene) properly applies to the CH_{2} group when it is connected to the rest of the molecule by a double bond (=CH_{2}), giving it chemical properties very distinct from those of a bridging CH_{2} group.

== Organic chemistry ==
It is the repeating unit in the skeleton of the unbranched alkanes. Polyethylene also can be called polymethylene.

Compounds possessing a methylene bridge located between two electron withdrawing groups (such as nitro, carbonyl or nitrile groups) are sometimes called active methylene compounds. Treatment of these with strong bases can form enolates or carbanions, which are often used in organic synthesis. Examples include the Knoevenagel condensation and the malonic ester synthesis.

Examples of compounds that contain an activated methylene bridge include:

Malonic acid

Acetylacetone

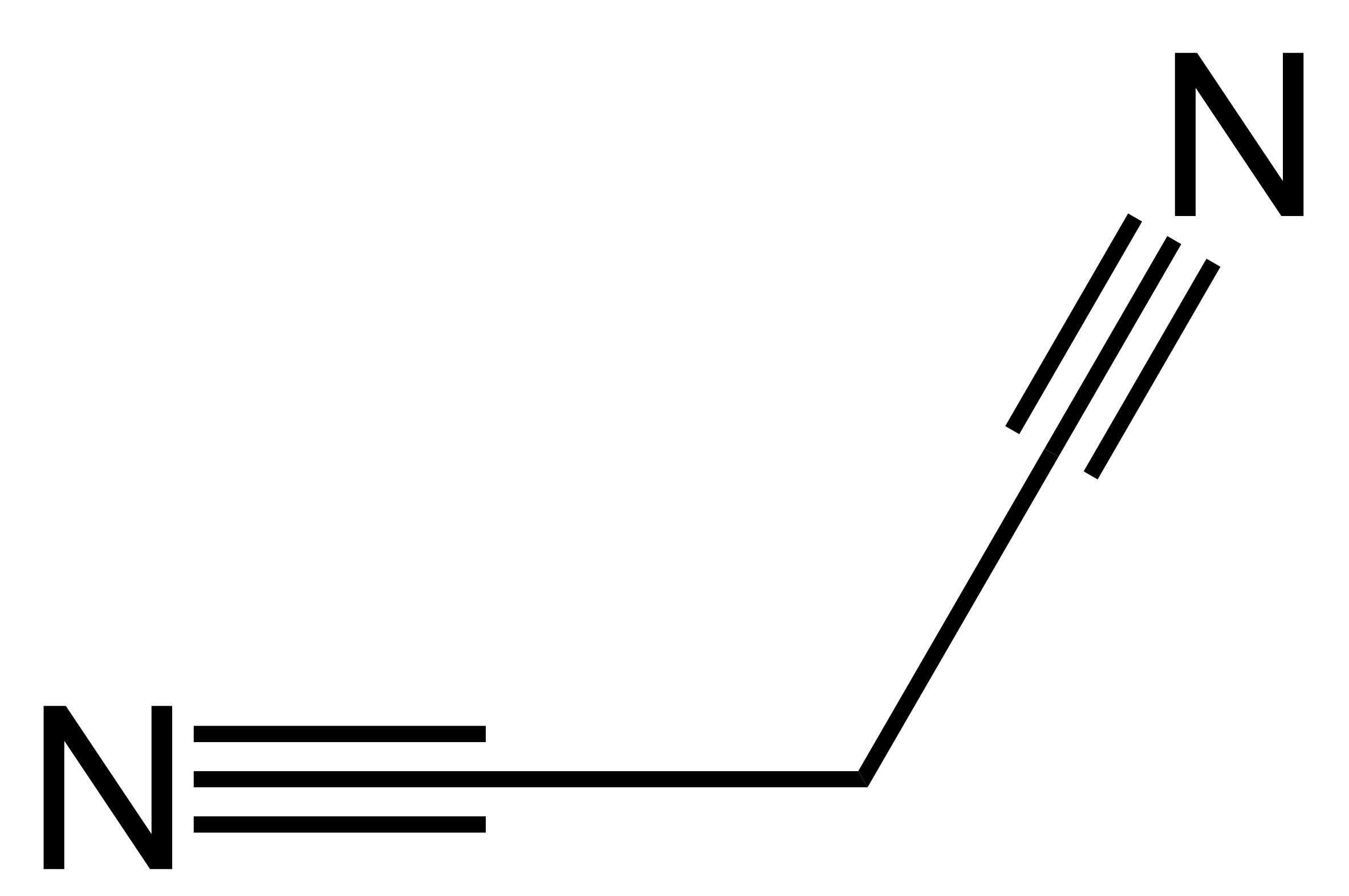
Malononitrile

== Inorganic and organometallic chemistry ==
A methylene bridge can be a ligand joining two metals. Titanium and aluminum are linked by a methylene bridge in Tebbe's reagent.

== Nomenclature ==
Methylene bridge is sometimes called a methylene spacer or methanediyl group.

== See also ==
- Methyl group
- Methylene group
- Methyne
