= Methylene group =

Chemical group (–CH2–)

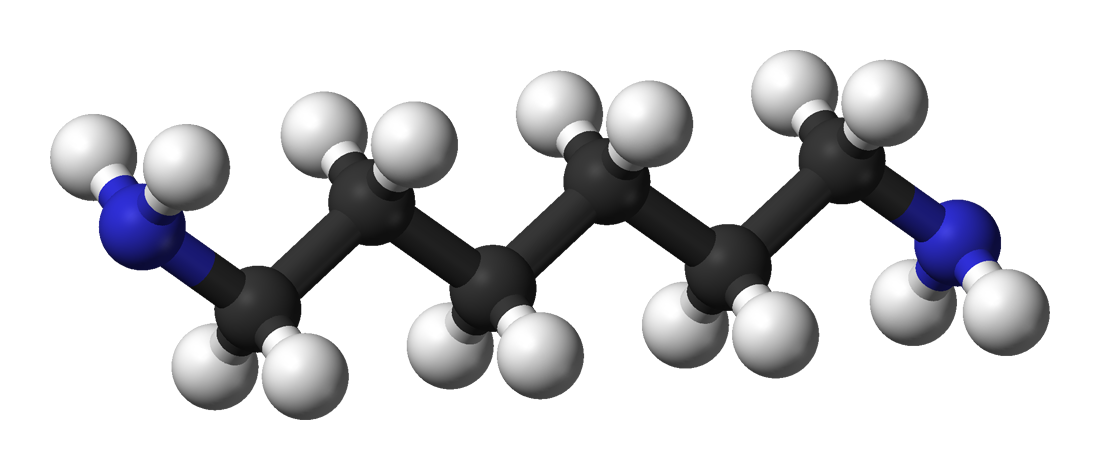
The hexamethylenediamine molecule contains six methylene groups, in this case also called methylene bridges.

A methylene group is any part of a molecule that consists of two hydrogen atoms bound to a carbon atom, which is connected to the remainder of the molecule by two single bonds. The group may be represented as −CH_{2}− or >CH_{2}, where the '>' denotes the two bonds.

This stands in contrast to a situation where the carbon atom is bound to the rest of the molecule by a double bond, which is preferably called a methylidene group, represented =CH_{2}. Formerly the methylene name was used for both isomers. The name "methylene bridge" can be used for the single-bonded isomer, to emphatically exclude methylidene. The distinction is often important, because the double bond is chemically different from two single bonds.

The methylene group should be distinguished from the CH_{2} molecule called carbene. (This was also formerly called methylene.)

== Activated methylene ==
Acidity of diethyl malonate, a 1,3-dicarbonyl compound

The central carbon in 1,3-dicarbonyl compound is known as an activated methylene group. This is because, owing to the structure, the carbon is especially acidic and can easily be deprotonated to form a methylene group.

== See also ==
- Carbene
- Methyl group
- Methine group
